= Battle of East Ghouta =

Battle of East Ghouta may refer to:

- Rif Dimashq offensive (April–May 2016)
- East Ghouta inter-rebel conflict (April–May 2016)
- East Ghouta inter-rebel conflict (April–May 2017)
- Rif Dimashq offensive (February–April 2018)
