= 2017 Jobar offensive =

Military operation launched by the Syrian Arab Army

- Part of the Rif Dimashq Governorate campaign of the Syrian Civil War
Date	20 June – 14 August 2017 (1 month, 3 weeks and 4 days)
Location	Syria: Jobar, Damascus Governorate; Ein Tarma, Rif Dimashq Governorate
Result	Offensive stalled: Syrian Army advance on Jobar repelled by rebels.

Belligerents
(Syria) Syrian Arab Republic	Al-Rahman Legion

Commanders and leaders
Unknown	Captain Abdul Nasr Shamir (al-Rahman Legion commander-in-chief); Abu Saeed al-Basha (al-Rahman Legion commander) †

Units involved
Syrian Armed Forces; Syrian Army; Republican Guard; 105th Brigade; 106th Brigade; 4th Armoured Division; Syrian Air Force; Ministry of Interior; Syrian Special Mission Forces; General Security Directorate	Al-Rahman Legion

Casualties and losses
Unknown	400 killed (per SAA)
- 50 civilians killed

The 2017 Jobar offensive was a military operation launched by the Syrian Arab Armed Forces and allies against rebel positions in the eastern outskirts of Damascus city, mainly the neighbourhood of Jobar and Ayn Tarma.

== Background ==
Jobar has remained the last major stronghold of rebels in east Damascus city since the SAA restored full control over the Qaboun and Barzeh districts earlier in May 2017.

From 14 to 18 June 2017, the Syrian Arab Air Force launched dozens of air and artillery strikes in Jobar to prepare for the offensive.

== The offensive ==
On 20 June, Syrian government forces launched a major military operation in the Jobar suburb in eastern Damascus, in a bid to capture this long-standing rebel stronghold. Prior to the ground attack, the Russian Air Force along with the Syrian Arab Air Force targeted rebel positions in Jobar, Ayn Tarma and Zamalka with heavy bombardment that was ongoing since pre-dawn hours. On 21 June, the military reportedly made advances in both Jobar and the Ain Terma area. The Syrian Network for Human Rights reported local activist claims of a chemical attack on northern Jobar on 22 June.

On 24 June, the Syrian Army captured the Ayn Tarma valley from the al-Rahman Legion, in addition to the southern parts of Ayn Tarma town. A rebel counter-attack was repelled on 26 June. On 28 June, Syrian Army advanced inside Ayn Tarma, securing areas near Sunbul Fuel Station and Ayn Tarma Garage, while in Jobar they captured some points in Taybah district near the Great Mosque.

On 29 June, the Syrian Army was in control of almost all buildings near the Sunbul Fuel Station and also captured the Ayn Tarma Junction, imperiling the main rebel supply route to Jobar. On 2 July, the 105th Brigade of the Republican Guard captured around 15 building blocks east of the M5 highway, and later captured most of Ayn Tarma's southern quarters. The al-Rahman Legion and the Syrian Network for Human Rights reported said that Ayn Tarma came under a chlorine gas attack.

On 5 July, Syrian Army operations resumed on Jobar and Ayn Tarma with the Army capturing a number of points in the Taybah area of the former and most of Ayn Tarma Triangle was captured in the latter. Concurrently, Jaysh al-Islam took advantage of the situation storming the towns of Beit Sawa and Al-Ashari. Four days later, the Army reached the center of Ayn Tarma Triangle and began pushing northwards. Government airstrikes continued through mid-July on Ayn Tarma, Hazzah and Zamalka as part of the offensive on Jobar, killing at least 23 residents.

On 22 July, a ceasefire was brokered in East Ghouta by Egypt, Russia, Jaysh al-Islam, and Syria's Tomorrow Movement. However, the Rahman Legion and Tahrir al-Sham were excluded from the ceasefire. The next day, Ayn Tarma, as well as Harasta, Arbeen and Douma, were hit by several airstrikes. More clashes between the Rahman Legion and the Syrian Army erupted overnight between 25 and 26 July.

On 8 August, fighting intensified in Ayn Tarma and other districts in eastern Damascus. The Rahman Legion targeted several Syrian Army vehicles at the front. By 9 August, dozens of artillery and air strikes hit residential neighbourhoods in the district.

It was reported on 12 August that the SAA made advances at the al-Manasher Roundabout and the Arab Neighborhood of Jobar. However, the next day, a rebel tunnel bomb blast killed between 16 and 20 soldiers in the Jobar district. Still, the Syrian Army made further progress on 14 August, as they pushed further southwards from al-Manasher Roundabout, capturing several building blocks east of Jobar Sports Hall.

== Aftermath – Continued fighting ==
Syrian government forces continued to bomb towns and villages in Eastern Ghouta in Rif Dimashq throughout late August and early September, along with ground operations around Jobar and Ayn Tarma, directed at ceasefire signatory al-Rahman Legion and other rebel groups.

On 25 September 2017, the Syrian Army, led by the Republican Guard and the 4th Armoured Division, reported it had broken through rebel frontlines along the Jobar-Ayn Tarma axis, resulting in the capture of 30 building blocks, some of which government sources said were demolished by the rebels to thwart further army gains. SOHR reported heavy shelling of built-up areas in Jobar on 26 September. Rahman Legion fighters were killed and injured after a pre-planned artillery strike hit them as they were maneuvering across an open road near the frontline in Ayn Tarma on 27 September. The next day, a tunnel complex was detonated by the Rahman Legion, resulting in massive devastation across the entire western part of Ayn Tarma and the deaths of 45 Syrian Army soldiers with dozens more injured. Afterwards there was a de-escalation of the fighting until 15 October, when rebel fighters shelled the Old City of Damascus, killing four and injuring nine people. The Syrian Air Force responded with airstrikes on Misraba, Saqba and Ayn Tarma.

In mid-November, shelling from government forces resulted in the deaths of 84 people, with 659 more injured, including hundreds of women and children, according to the World Health Organization. Further attacks in late November killed more civilians. The United Nations concluded that "the number of civilians killed and injured in heavily populated areas may indicate that some military operations are conducted in an indiscriminate manner.".

Throughout 2017, around 500 civilians organised for medical evacuation by the United Nations and partner organisations were denied by Government forces maintaining the siege on Rebel territory. Due to the effects of the siege, child malnutrition in the pocket increased five-fold throughout the year.

== See also ==
- Qaboun offensive (2017)
