= 4th Armoured Division (Syria) =

- الفرقة الرابعة
- Divisional tactical color marking.
- Active: 1984 – 2024
- Country: Ba'athist Syria (surrendered)
- Branch: Syrian Arab Army (surrendered)
- Type: Armoured division
- Role: Shock troops
- Size: 18,000 soldiers (2021)
- Garrison/HQ: Damascus
- Nickname: "Ghaith Forces" (42nd Brigade)
- Engagements: Syrian Civil War; Siege of Daraa; Siege of Rastan and Talbiseh; Siege of Jisr al-Shughur; Siege of Baniyas; Idlib Governorate clashes; Siege of Homs; 2011–2012 Damascus clashes; Battle of Damascus; Battle of Aleppo; Battle of Zabadani (2015); Rif Dimashq offensive (June–August 2016); Khan al-Shih offensive (October–November 2016); Siege of Wadi Barada; Qaboun offensive (2017); 2017 Jobar offensive; Beit Jinn offensive; Battle of Harasta (2017–2018); Northwestern Syria campaign (October 2017–February 2018); Battle of Khasham; Rif Dimashq offensive (February–April 2018); Southern Damascus offensive (April–May 2018); As-Suwayda offensive (August–November 2018); Northwestern Syria offensive (April–August 2019); Northwestern Syria offensive (December 2019–March 2020); March 2020 Daraa clashes; 2021 Daraa offensive; Syrian Desert campaign (December 2017 – December 2024); Fall of Damascus

Commanders
- Commander: Maj. Gen. Maher al-Assad
- Chief of Staff: Brig. Gen. Ghiath Dalla
- Brigade Commanders: Brig. Gen. Kamal Salah Shaddud (138th Brigade); Brig. Gen. Jawdat Ibrahim Safi (154th Regiment); Brig. Gen. Jamal Yunes (555th Regiment); Maj. Gen. Asif Al-Daker (Military Police Commander); Maj. Gen. Ghassan Nafie Bilal (Security Office Commander)
- Notable commanders: Maj. Gen. Ali Hasan Badran; Maj. Gen. Mohamed Ali Durgham; Maj. Gen. Ghassan Belal; Maj. Gen. Ali Mahmoud †; Brig. Gen. Bassem Adel Allasha

The 4th Armoured Division (Arabic: الفرقة الرابعة, romanized: al-Firqa ar-Rābiʿah) was an elite formation of the Syrian Arab Army whose primary purpose was to defend Syria from internal and external threats. The division was considered one of the most combat-ready formations of the Syrian Arab Army. It played a key role in some battles of the Syrian Civil War.

== History ==
=== 1984–2011 ===
The division had its roots in the Defense Companies commanded by Rifaat al-Assad, younger brother of President Hafez al-Assad. After Rifaat was banished from Syria in 1984, the Defense Companies were reorganised into the 569th Armoured Division, and later into the 4th Armoured Division.

The Division was regarded by some as the best trained and best equipped of the Syrian Army. The 4th Armoured Division, the Republican Guard, and Syria's secret police formed the heart of the country's security forces. As a result, the Division was drawn mostly from members of the same Alawite group as the Assad family.

The Division had a military base in the south of Damascus, covering about 91 square kilometres (35 sq mi) and including several mountain bunkers. Its main entrance gate was located next to the village of Al-Horjelah.

=== Syrian civil war ===
The division played a key role in the early insurgency phase of the Syrian civil war (2011–2012) in the government's attempts to defeat the rebels. The division's units were deployed in the city of Daraa, the coastal city of Baniyas, Homs, Idlib, Aleppo and others. Since 2012, the division had been stationed in Damascus. The first major operation outside of Damascus Governorate in which the 4th Division took part was Battle for Idlib in 2012. The division then conducted operations in the western and northern parts of the Damascus governorate, which consisted of blocking rebel enclaves in Wadi Barad, Jimraya, in the west Ghouta and in Al-Tal. Subsequently, the division led the siege of Darayya and Muadamiyat. Alawite officers from the 4th Armoured Division have been sent to other formations within the Syrian army in an attempt by the government to keep a closer eye and firmer grip on many Sunni-dominated formations.

Both the division as a whole and its component parts have been accused of engaging in human rights abuses during the Syrian uprising, such as arbitrary arrests and beatings, and the shooting of unarmed protesters.

A July 2013 report by a pro-government websites stated that Maher al-Assad had been commanding troops in the Aleppo and Homs theatre of operations. Later in 2020, there were reports of their control over international border crossings, such as Nasib Border Crossing and other illegal border crossings between Lebanon and Syria, which are used as financial sources to cover their expenses. After the start of Russian military operation in Syria in 2015, the division was able to take the cities of Muadamiyat al-Sham, Khan al-Shih, Darayya and the Wadi Barada valley. In 2017, the division took on combat operations in Qaboun, which ended with victory. In November 2017, division units took part in the assault on Abu Kamal. Between 2019 and 2020, the unit also participated in the Dawn of Idlib 1 and Dawn of Idlib 2 operations. Between 1 and 3 March 2020, the 4th Division and 9th Armoured Division stormed Al-Sanamayn during the 2020 Daraa Clashes. The division led the anti-rebel operations during the 2021 Daraa offensive.

From 2020, the 4th Division became deeply linked to the Syrian Captagon industry. According to the Syrian Observatory for Human Rights, Maher al-Assad and his forces controlled the major drug manufacturing facilities of the state. The division's soldiers were responsible for the domestic distribution of drugs and protected their delivery to local markets. Furthermore, the 4th Division reportedly quarrelled with Hezbollah over control of the drug profits, eventually excluding the Lebanese party from the trade.

Amid the fall of the Assad regime in late 2024, the 4th Armoured Division under Maher al-Assad was one of the few loyalist units to attempt defending Damascus. These efforts were hampered by the chaos and general collapse of the Syrian Armed Forces, with 4th Division's second-in-command being killed during the Fall of Damascus. Maher was among his troops when informed that his brother Bashar had fled the country, whereupon he escaped the capital with a helicopter.

==== Post Assad Syria ====
On 11 February 2025, the HTS-led Syrian Defense Ministry has appointed the former head of the "Deterrence Aggression" operation room as the commander of the Damascus Division, which refers to the former 4th Division.

== Structure ==
As of 2021, the 4th Division consisted of four brigades: 38, 40, 41, 42 and 138. Regiments 154, 333, 555, and 666 are affiliated with it. All of these military units belong to the Armored Corps. Specialized factions and brigades are affiliated with it as well. The 4th Division also had other army sectors and a number of regular soldiers, including conscripts and recruits, was approximately 18,000. The structure has a standard five-brigade composition of four armored and one motorized infantry brigades, with additional artillery, special forces units and logistics support units.

Up to 90% of the division's soldiers, numbering from 12 to 25 thousand people (according to various estimates), are professionals (contract soldiers), unlike most other Syrian Army units, formed from conscripts. About 80% of the division's soldiers and officers are Alawites. The 4th Division lost many experienced officers and ran its own training program, it was not adopting any practices brought in by Russia or incorporated by other army units.

=== Weapons ===
It has about 500 tanks of various models, in addition to armored vehicles (APCs, IFVs) for transporting supplies, infantry, etc. The 4th Division was armed with the tanks T-90, T-72AV, T-72M1, T-72B3, T-62M and T-55AM/MV/AMV. Also, some T-72 tanks are equipped with the Italian fire control system TURMS-T with a commander’s panoramic sight and are designated as T-72S. Syrian-made T-72 Adra and T-72 Shafrah are also part of the armored units. Artillery consists of a 122mm self-propelled gun 2S1 Gvozdika, Golan MLRS and Burkan (both MLRS in the 42nd Armored Brigade).

== Order of Battle (2021) ==
4th Armoured Division Shoulder Markings

4th Armoured Division (2021)

- 38th Armored Brigade (Note: (created in 2021))
- 40th Armored Brigade
- 41st Armored Brigade
- 42nd Armored Brigade
- 138th Mechanized Brigade
- 333rd Infantry Regiment (Note: (created in 2017))
- 555th Special Forces (Airborne) Regiment
- 666th Infantry Regiment (Note: (created in 2017))
- 154th Artillery Regiment
- Al-Imam Hussein Brigade
- Harakat Hezbollah al-Nujaba Syrian-wing

== See also ==
- Republican Guard (Syria)
- Khamis Brigade (Libya)
