= East Ghouta inter-rebel conflict =

East Ghouta inter-rebel conflict may refer to:

- East Ghouta inter-rebel conflict (April–May 2016)
- East Ghouta inter-rebel conflict (April–May 2017)
