= Rif Dimashq offensive (February–April 2018) =

2018 military offensive

- Part of the Rif Dimashq Governorate campaign (Syrian civil war), the siege of Eastern Ghouta and the Russian military intervention in the Syrian civil war
- Map of the operation
Date	18 February – 14 April 2018 (1 month, 3 weeks and 6 days)
Location	Eastern Ghouta, Rif Dimashq Governorate, Syria
Result	Syrian Army-allied victory
Territorial changes	The Syrian army captures the entire rebel-held Eastern Ghouta pocket

Belligerents
(Syria) Syrian Government; Russia; Allied militias: Liwa al-Quds; Palestine Liberation Army; PFLP-GC; Arab Nationalist Guard; Free Palestine Movement; Harakat Hezbollah al-Nujaba (covertly); Kata'ib Hezbollah; Liwa Fatemiyoun	Syrian Opposition; Syrian Salvation Government (surrendered); Ahrar al-Sham (surrendered); Jaysh al-Islam (surrendered); Al-Rahman Legion (surrendered)

Commanders and leaders
(Syria) Maj. Gen. Suheil al-Hassan (Tiger Forces) (Syria) Col. Ghiath Dalla (42nd Armored Brigade)	Essam al-Buwaydhani (surrendered) (Jaysh al-Islam leader); Capt. Abdul Nasr Shamir (surrendered) (al-Rahman Legion commander in chief); Abu Ali Dhiya al-Shaghouri † (al-Rahman Legion chief of staff)

Units involved
Syrian Armed Forces; Syrian Army; Republican Guard; 104th Airborne Brigade; 105th Brigade; 106th Brigade; Tiger Forces; 14th Special Forces Division; 1st Corps; 7th Mechanized Division; 9th Armoured Division; 2nd Corps; 4th Armoured Division; 42nd Armored Brigade; 10th Mechanized Division; 62nd Mechanized Brigade; 5th Corps; ISIS Hunters; National Defence Forces; Syrian Air Force; Eagles of the Whirlwind; Russian Armed Forces; Aerospace Forces; Special operations forces advisors; Wagner Group	SSG; Hayat Tahrir al-Sham (surrendered); Jaysh al-Islam; Military Council of Damascus and its Suburbs; Al-Rahman Legion; Al-Bara Brigade; Glory Brigades; Abu Musa al-Shari Brigade; Ajnad al-Sham Islamic Union (Eastern Ghouta branch); Al-Habib al-Mustafa Brigade; 101st Battalion; Ahrar al-Sham; Fajr al-Umma Brigade

Strength
(Syria) 15,000+: Liwa al-Quds: 2,000+	(Syrian opposition) 20,000: 10,000; 8,000; 600

Casualties and losses
(Syria) 520–541 killed, 2 captured 2–3 killed	405 killed, 1,200 surrendered (most switched sides)
- 4,835 civilians killed (Eastern Ghouta & Damascus)

The Rif Dimashq offensive (February–April 2018), code-named Operation Damascus Steel, was a military offensive launched by the Syrian Arab Army (SAA) in February 2018 in a bid to capture the rebel-held eastern Ghouta suburb during the Syrian civil war. East Ghouta, a pocket of towns and farms, had been under government siege since 2013 and had been a major rebel stronghold in the vicinity of the capital of Damascus. According to the United Nations, nearly 400,000 people live in East Ghouta.

On 14 April, the Syrian Army fully captured the Eastern Ghouta pocket. Before the offensive had concluded, the Associated Press reported that the capture of the whole rebel-held Eastern Ghouta enclave would represent one of the most significant victories for Syrian president Bashar al-Assad in the civil war, and the worst setback for the rebels since their defeat in the Battle of Aleppo in late 2016. Similarly, Reuters stated the capture of Eastern Ghouta would represent the biggest prize for President al-Assad since the full recapture of Aleppo. During the offensive, one of the heaviest bombardments of the war took place with more than 4,000 people being killed by air and artillery strikes.

== Background ==
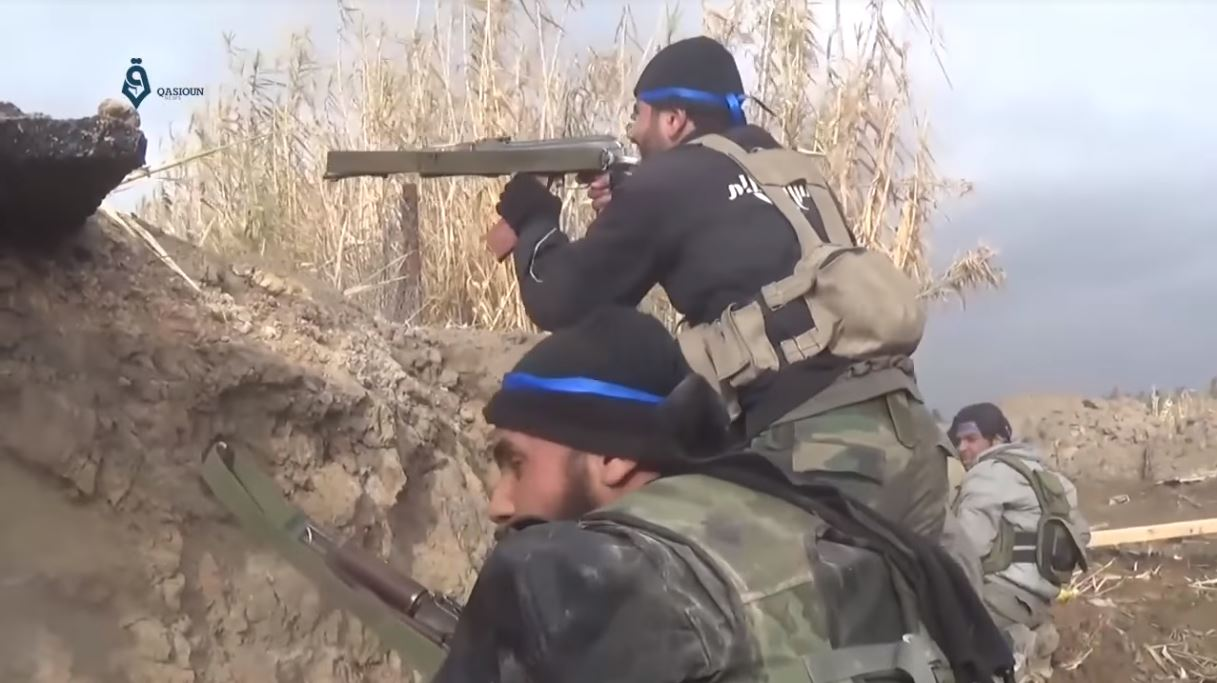
Islamist Jaysh al-Islam (pictured) was the most challenging rebel faction during the siege of Eastern Ghouta.

With most of the suburbs of Damascus recaptured by the Syrian government by February 2018, there remained a significant swathe of the countryside near the capital city captured by fundamentalist rebels from the mainstream ones in 2012 that had been under siege by pro-government forces since 2013. The rebels used to shell the capital daily and tried to infiltrate it many times.

Syrian forces began bombarding and shelling the area in early February after Russian-brokered peace talks failed, killing 200 by 8 February, according to the Syrian Observatory for Human Rights. They again started bombarding it on 18 February, and did so for eight consecutive days before beginning the ground offensive.

The main rebel faction in the area was Jaysh al-Islam, based in Douma (with an estimated 10,000–15,000 fighters in the region in early 2018). The second largest was Faylaq al-Rahman, an official affiliate of the Free Syrian Army (FSA), controlling much of central and western parts of Ghouta, including the Jobar and Ain Terma districts. In addition, Ahrar al-Sham (based in Harasta) and Tahrir al-Sham (HTS—controlling smaller districts such as Arbin, Hawsh Al-Ash'ari and Bait Naim, with an estimated strength in the area of 250–500 in February 2018) had a far smaller presence.

== Offensive ==
=== Initial bombardment ===
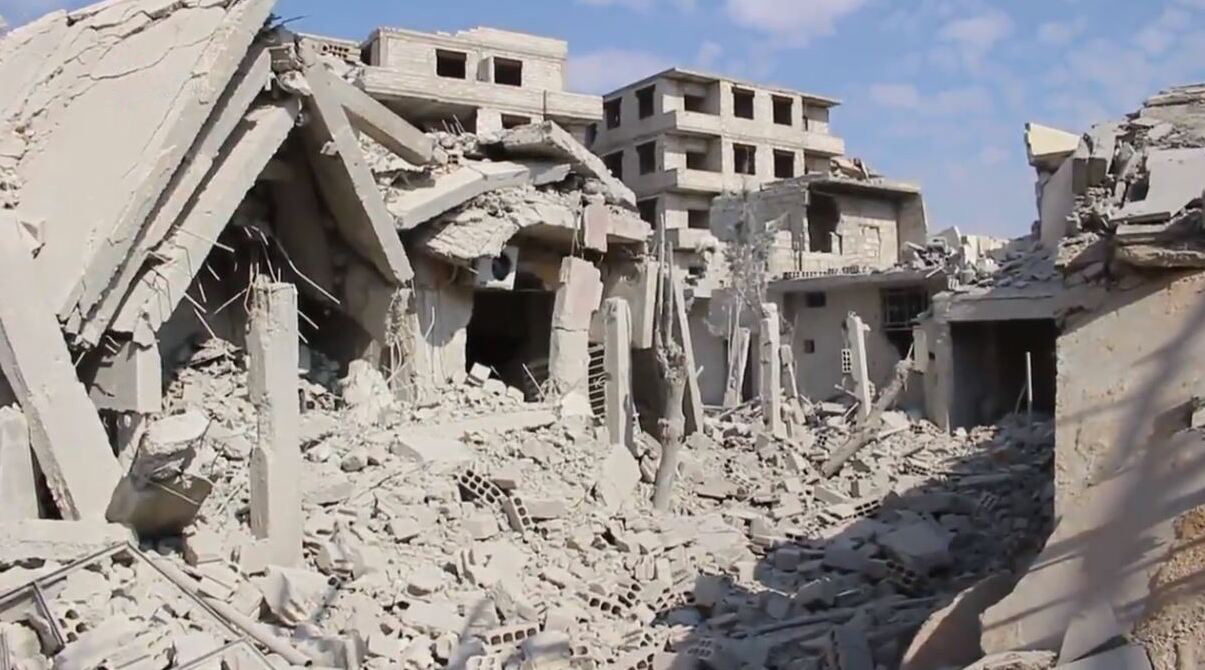
Area in Zamalka that was destroyed by the bombardment.

On the evening of 18 February 2018, heavy artillery and airstrikes began targeting the rebel-held East Ghouta enclave. The Syrian Air Force launched large-scale air raids over the region, with warplanes reportedly striking rebel defensive positions, hospitals, and residential areas in and around the district towns of Douma, Hamouriyah, Saqba and Mesraba. Accompanying artillery shelling and rocket strikes pounded rebel territory. Overall, 260 rocket and air-strikes were conducted during the day. By the following day, the strikes had reportedly killed 94 civilians. Concurrently, government troops were preparing for a ground assault, establishing positions on both the western and eastern axis of the pocket. Early rebel retaliatory mortar attacks on central Damascus killed one civilian. Around midnight between 19 and 20 February, the Russian Air Force joined the offensive as well, targeting several rebel-held districts.

On 22 February, the Syrian Army dropped leaflets over Ghouta, calling on residents to leave the area and urging opposition fighters to hand themselves over. Meanwhile, a total of 16 civilians had been killed and about 128 wounded in retaliatory rebel rocket attacks on Damascus between the 18 and 20 February. On 24 February, despite an adopted resolution by the United Nations Security Council (UNSC) on a 30-day ceasefire in Syria, it was reported that airstrikes continued after the vote.

=== Ground assault ===
At around 8:30 a.m. local on the morning of 25 February, hours after the United Nations Security Council called for a 30-day truce, a ground assault began with the Syrian Army's 4th Division capturing multiple points around the Bashoura Air Defense Battalion on the southeastern front of the pocket on the Hazrama and Tal Farzat approach. Shortly afterwards, it was reported that the Army captured the town of Al-Nashabiyah, the villages of Hazrama and Al-Salihiyah, and the hilltop of Tal Farzat from Jaysh al-Islam fighters—continuing the advance towards Hawsh Zariqiyah. However, pro-government sources later reported Al-Nashabiyah and Hazrama had not been captured, but instead partially surrounded. At around 10:00 a.m., an assault on a new axis commenced with Syrian Army units attacking the rebels on the Harasta-Arbin front in the northwestern part of the pocket. The Army's 4th Division also pushed into the rebel-held Al-Ajami district of Harasta, capturing some buildings in the area. Meanwhile, it was initially reported that the heavily fortified village of Hawsh Dawahra was also captured in the east of the pocket, however it was later confirmed that the assaulting government troops were ambushed by the rebels, with up to 15 soldiers killed and a tank captured. The village remained under rebel control. Among the army's weapons used to level entire swathes of rebel trenches and fire support positions in the assault was the UR-77 (УР-77) Mineclearing System.

The same day as the ground operation started, a video surfaced of the Syrian Army's Brigadier General Suheil al-Hassan speaking to troops in Damascus, while being guarded by Russian and Syrian soldiers. During his speech, al-Hassan said: "Damascus awaits you, to dress her in victory... With God, we will be victorious, and with faith, we will be victorious. Remember that each one of you decided to fight to defend the truth, dignity, and to save Syria and its people". By the end of the day, Jaysh al-Islam claimed to have killed 70 pro-government fighters and captured 14 on the first day of the ground offensive. In contrast, the UK-based pro-opposition activist group Syrian Observatory for Human Rights (SOHR) reported 13 soldiers and six rebels were killed, while two soldiers were captured.

On 25 February, the UN Security Council passed a resolution calling for a thirty-day humanitarian ceasefire. Nonetheless, Syrian Army advances continued on 26 February, with the 4th Division capturing a large part of the Harasta orchards, including an elaborate tunnel complex, according to pro-government sources. The advances were reported to be "notable". Local opposition NGOs reported a chlorine attack on al-Shifaniyah, a town close to the front lines, killing a child. The next day at 09:00 a.m., Russia called for a five-hour truce. A "humanitarian corridor" was opened for civilians to leave the area; however, according to the Russian Ministry of Defence, it was shelled by rebel groups in order to prevent civilians from leaving the area, although this was denied by rebels. The Syrian Interim Government called the corridor a choice between "death under bombardment" or a forced displacement, and called for UN aid. The UN and other humanitarian organisations said that it was impossible to deliver aid under such conditions and called for the combatants to abide by its 30-day ceasefire. A major pro-government air attack was reported in Douma that day.

Report about the destruction caused by the Syrian Armed Forces' bombardment of Arbin, 27 February

By 27 February, it was reported that the offensive had caused some 560 casualties in 10 days, including 107 children.

A second five-hour truce was called by Russia on 28 February. However, early that day, following a night-time operation, pro-government forces captured Hawsh Dawahra. During the fighting for Hawsh Dawahra, government forces utilized a mobile bridge to cross a moat near Sifco Laboratories and seize rebel trenches. The Army also made attempts to advance towards the town of Al-Shifouniyah, where they made limited gains during the day. It was later reported that Army troops managed to enter Al-Shifouniyah. The next day, the Syrian army captured Bashoura Air Defense Base, south west of Hawsh Dawahra.

After the third round of night-time assaults, government forces captured the village of Hawsh Al-Zarqiyah on 2 March, after which the Army started shelling the nearby town of Utaya. Later in the day, the Army also captured the Battalion 274 base, south of Al-Shifouniyah. Meanwhile, the rebels launched a counter-attack within Harasta, which went on for hours, resulting in numerous casualties on both sides. The next day, the Army took control of Utaya, Al-Nashabiyah and Hazrama, as well as most of Al-Shifouniyah. The Army also attacked the town of al-Rayhan in the northeastern part of the Ghouta pocket, but was repelled. The advances took place following heavy fighting throughout the day for Utaya, with the army eventually seizing the town. Pro-government sources described the rebel defense of Utaya as "fanatical", and said the most violent clashes took place in the town's northern outskirts. Following the capture of Utaya, the rebel defense of Al-Nashabiyah and Hazrama quickly collapsed, leaving the two towns fully surrounded. Within one hour, the Army captured Al-Nashabiyah and Hazrama without resistance after it became clear the rebels had retreated from the towns in the final hours of fighting for Utaya to avoid being besieged. Hours later, it was reported that the Army was on the verge of also completely taking control of Al-Shifouniyah. At this point, Michael Stephens of the London-based think tank Royal United Services Institute told The National that the fall of the rebel-held Eastern Ghouta pocket was "inevitable". In the evening, the Army reportedly reached two new rebel-held towns, while the rebel supply line along the Douma-Al-Shifouniyah road came within range of their artillery. During their advances over the previous several days, the Army had broken through a 12-kilometre defensive belt linking Al-Nashabiyah with Rayhan called "The Trench of Death".

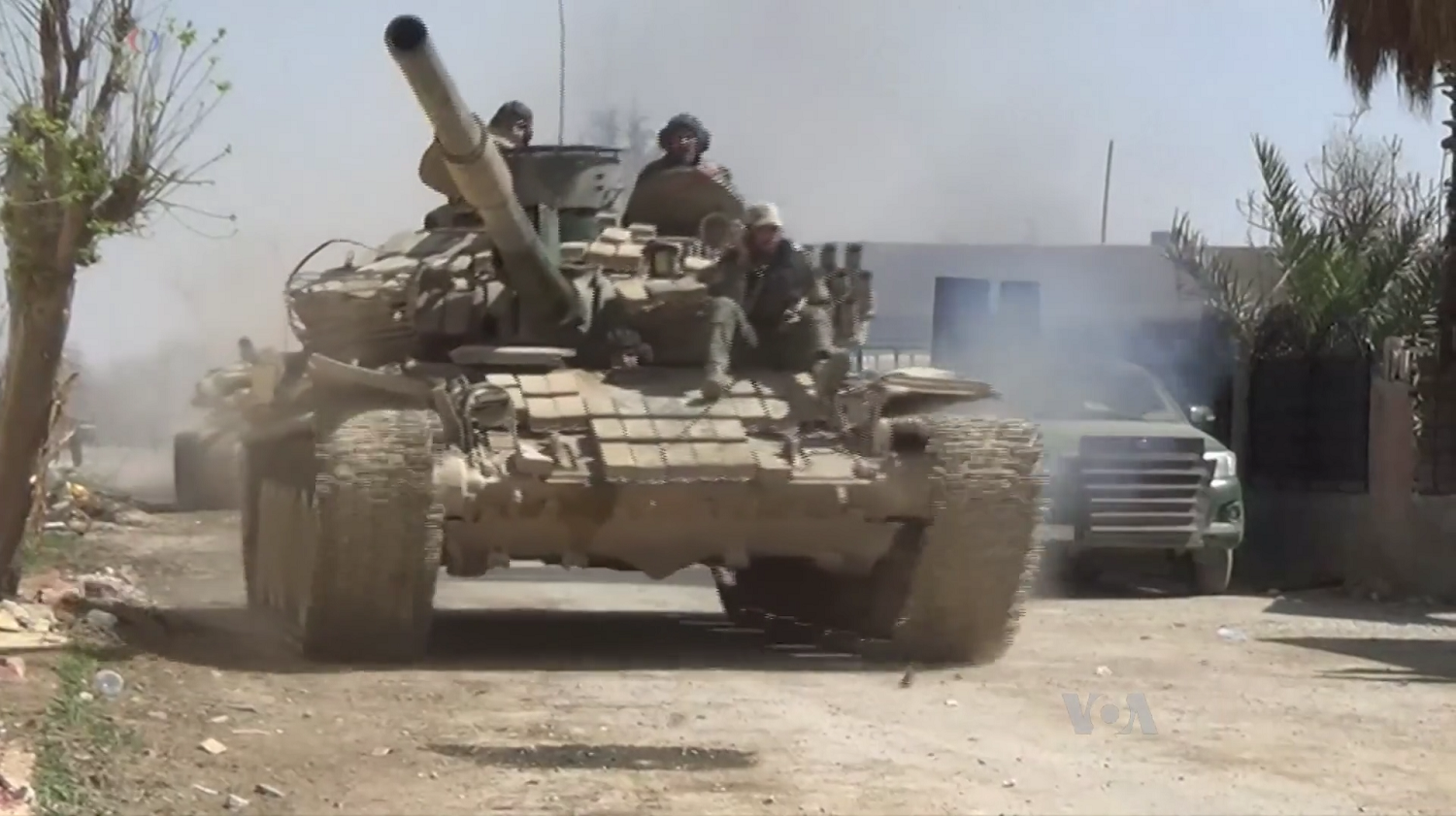
Syrian Army tanks advance during the offensive

On 4 March, the rebels managed to recapture large parts of Al-Shifouniyah in a counter-attack. Meanwhile, the Army's Republican Guard captured the town of Beit Naem in the south of the pocket. Following the advances over the previous two days, the Army started operations to split the Eastern Ghouta pocket into two parts, with 3 kilometres (1.9 mi) remaining for this to be accomplished. A spokesman for Jaysh al-Islam claimed via Twitter that rebels had killed 150 soldiers since the previous night. Contrary to this, the SOHR reported 12 soldiers had been killed. Several hours after the capture of Beit Naem, the Army had retaken full control of Al-Shifouniyah.

By 5 March, 35% of the Eastern Ghouta pocket had been taken by the Syrian Army, which was 2 kilometres (1.2 mi) southeast of rebel-held Douma. Pro-government sources reported that the 4th Armoured Division captured several farms to the northwest and came within one kilometer of cutting the Harasta-Douma road, and that the government's Tiger Forces had made advances in the south of the pocket. An aid convoy reached the region for the first time since the start of the offensive, but the government stripped it of some supplies (70% of its truckloads according to the World Health Organization) and it was forced to withdraw without delivering aid after government shelling.

Early on 6 March, most of al-Rayhan, in the northeast of the pocket, was reportedly captured after the army advanced north of Al-Shifouniyah. In the afternoon, the Army's Tiger Forces captured the town of al-Muhammadiyah in the south of the pocket. The same day, Russia offered the rebels and their families safe passage out of Eastern Ghouta. The rebels rejected the offer as "psychological warfare" and stated their defense lines had been re-established after crumbling in the first days of the offensive. Farms around Mesraba, Beit Sawa and Hawsh Al-Ash'ari had been captured by the army by the end of the day.

=== Splitting the pocket ===
On 7 March, pro-government forces intensified their artillery and aerial bombardment. The military captured Beit Sawa and Hawsh Al-Ash'ari, clearing the way for an attack on nearby rebel-held Mesraba. Later, Mesraba was being struck by "preparatory fire" before a planned infantry assault. Civilians fled rural frontline areas into Douma, sheltering in basements. By nightfall, pro-government forces had practically cut the Eastern Ghouta pocket in two with artillery fire. At this point, government troops advancing from the east were between 1 and 1.3 kilometers from reaching the army's Harasta vehicle base on the pocket's western edge. The SOHR said that at least 867 civilians had been killed by bombing and shelling in the offensive, with at least 62 killed on 7 March.

In response to the Syrian Army's gains, the rebels reported they were deploying more guerrilla-style ambushes in lost territory in an attempt to stop further advances. On 8 March, the military captured the town of Hawsh Qubaybat, as well as the Aftris Air Defence Battalion base, near the rebel-held town of Aftris.

On 10 March, after 24 hours of fighting, the army seized Mesraba, as well as the Kilani gas station on the main highway, thus splitting the Eastern Ghouta rebel enclave into three sections. The three separated pockets were Harasta, Douma and the southern part of Eastern Ghouta. The rebels denied Eastern Ghouta had been entirely split, but SOHR stated the roads between the three parts were indeed cut due to artillery fire. Government shelling during the day reportedly focused on underground shelters and even mosques, many of which were being used as hiding spots for civilians. Government forces also advanced towards the Harasta vehicle base, although they failed to capture Madyara, the last town separating them from the base. The next day, the rebels continued to put up fierce resistance to prevent the linking up of government troops with the vehicle base. Nevertheless, the Syrian Army eventually captured Madyara, thus officially physically splitting Eastern Ghouta in two and reaching the Harasta vehicle base.

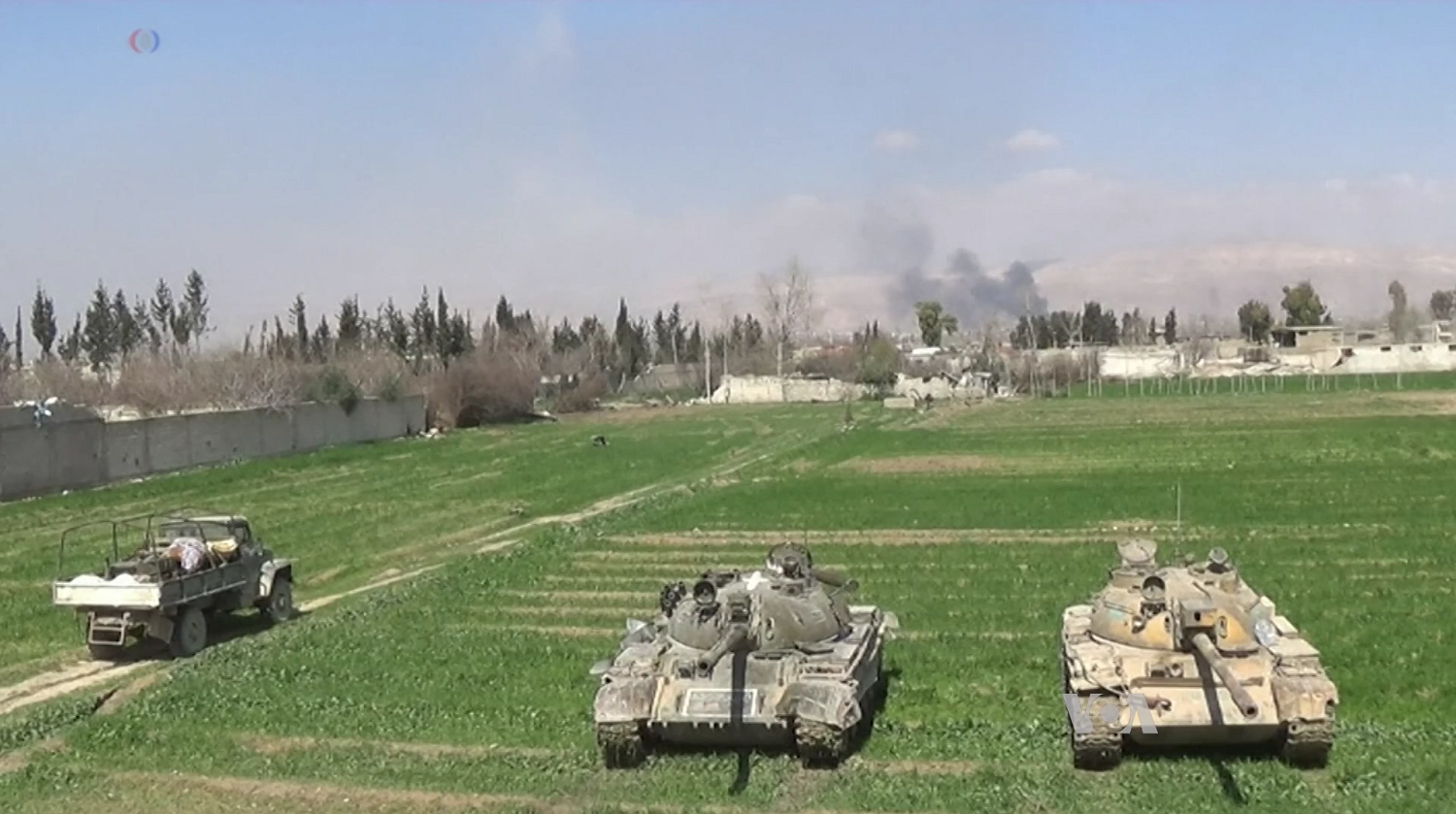
Stationary Syrian Army tanks on a field in Eastern Ghouta, 12 March 2018

On 12 March, government forces were 200 to 300 meters from physically cutting off Harasta from Douma. Later in the day, the military finished encircling Harasta, cutting it off from Douma. The army had also captured the town of Aftris, thus fully clearing the rural areas of the southern part of Eastern Ghouta. The battle for the town lasted several days due to heavy rebel defenses which consisted of a wide anti-tank ditch and several well-fortified layers of trenches and tactical positions in and around it. Government forces also shelled rebel positions on the Jobar axis during the day. Meanwhile, tensions erupted in the rebel-held town of Kafr Batna, with the rebels shooting at civilian protesters who were demanding an evacuation deal with the government; one protester was killed, according to a local doctor.

Rebel territory in Eastern Ghouta was now officially reduced to three pockets, one in the north around Douma held by Jaysh al-Islam; a second in the south around Hamouria held by Faylaq al-Rahman; and a third in the west around Harasta held by Ahrar al-Sham.

=== Clearing the pockets ===
On 14 March, the Syrian Army and allied militias stormed the northern neighborhood of Hamouriyah (under Faylaq al-Rahman control), entered the southern part of al-Rayhan, captured "roughly" 40% of Jisreen from Faylaq al-Rahman, and shelled Arbin and Kafr Batna. By the end of the day, according to pro-government sources, Al-Ahlam food factory and an army station to the south of Beit Sawa were also captured from the rebels. By the next day, the military was in control of the eastern half of Hamouriyah.

On 15 March, nearly 20,000 civilians left Hamouriyah towards areas under government control. Concurrently, the military captured Hamouriyah after the rebels withdrew to the town of Ein Tarma to the southwest. During their retreat from Hamouriyah, according to government sources, the rebels left behind snipers and small hit-and-run units in the town in order to slow down the government's advance; the snipers were flushed out with tanks and surgical strikes. Government troops also captured al-Rayhan in Douma from Jaysh al-Islam after two weeks of fighting. On 16 March, the Syrian Army and allies fully captured and secured the town of Jisreen. On 17 March, it was reported that government forces had taken full control of Kafr Batna and also captured the town of Saqba; between 7,000 and 10,000 civilians left the combat zone for government-held areas. However, the Syrian Army and allies secured full control over Kafr Batna the following day.

On 21 March, Ahrar al-Sham agreed to surrender Harasta in exchange for evacuation to rebel territory in northwestern Syria, as well as an offer to be pardoned under reconciliation terms, with 1,500 Sham fighters and 6,000 of their family members expected to be evacuated to rebel-held areas in Idlib province by 22 March, starting with wounded civilians. Syrian government military sources reported that 140 families were transported that day. Buses carrying rebels and their families began leaving on 22 March, with about 30 buses evacuating around 1,500 people including about 400 rebels. The next day, Syrian state TV claimed that the last group of rebels and their families were evacuated, with 3,000 people, including 1,000 rebels, having been evacuated from the town.

On 20 March, the Syrian Army reported that it launched an assault on the Ein Tarma valley, quickly capturing most of the valley and reaching the southeastern outskirts of the Ein Tarma suburb. By the next day, the military reported it was in control of 70 percent of the valley and was 500 meters from fully seizing it. On the morning of 22 March, the army reported it fully secured the valley as the rebels retreated to the Ein Tarma suburb. On 23 March, government forces captured most of the suburb, as the rebels withdrew towards Zamalka and Arbin. The Syrian Army reportedly raised the Syrian government flag in Ein Tarma's center, and had taken the nearby Hamza area. Meanwhile, Russian aircraft were reported by opposition sources to have targeted Douma with burning phosphorus and cluster bombs, resulting in ten civilian deaths.

On 23 March, after a deal was reached between the Syrian government and Faylaq al-Rahman, a ceasefire was officially enacted in the four major towns that still had a rebel presence - Arbin, Zamalka, Ein Tarma and Jobar. The ceasefire allowed for the immediate evacuation of wounded, with rebel fighters allowed to carry their light weapons and civilians their belongings. Under the deal, those who chose to remain were to be guaranteed safety from government reprisals as Russian military police would supervise the evacuations. The deal left one city, Douma, still under opposition control, which, according to The Guardian, had 150,000 civilians living there. The transportation out of the four towns began on 24 March, with 950 leaving, and continued on 25 March, with over 5,400 displaced. At least 6,749 people left the night between 26 and 27 March, the largest single-day evacuation from the region, according to Syrian state media. On 31 March, the last of the evacuations was conducted and the Syrian Army declared victory in Eastern Ghouta, while the rebels that were still holding out in Douma were given an ultimatum to surrender by the end of the day.

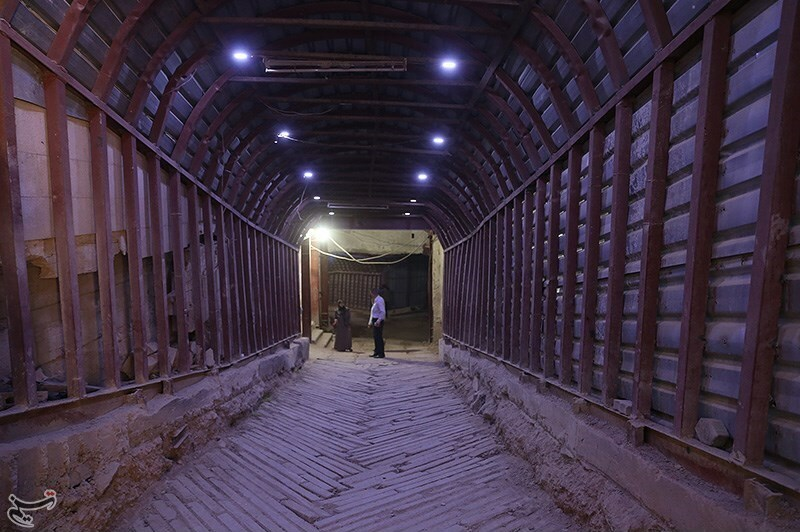
Tunnels in Douma.

Following the rebel retreat from the Eastern Ghouta towns, the military discovered a complex network of secret tunnels, including well-stocked underground hospitals and corridors used by the rebels to move weaponry and ammunition between all of the towns. One entry point to the tunnel network, located among shops and buildings on a war-ravaged street, was able allow vehicles to drive underground. Many government troops were shocked at how many tunnels there were, as well as how long they were and how safe they were for those inside. The Syrian Army reportedly discovered documents confirming a secret cooperation between a United States-based company and the rebels, with the company funding and regularly paying the rebels.

=== Douma ===
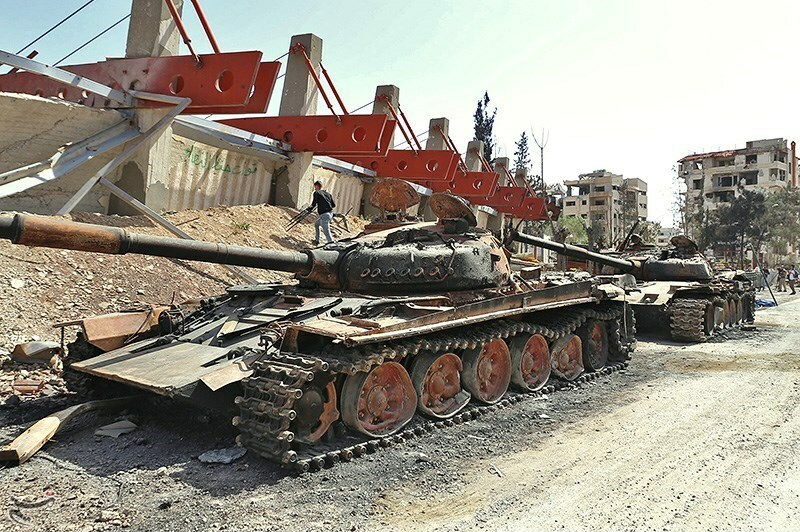
Destroyed Jaysh al-Islam tanks in Douma, April 2018

Intensive negotiations took place between the government and Jaysh al-Islam, who held Douma, the last rebel stronghold in the eastern Ghouta. With no progress in talks, on 28 March, government forces announced they were preparing a "huge" operation to take the town if rebels failed to evacuate. On 1 April, government and Hezbollah sources reported that a deal had been reached between the Jaysh al-Islam rebels and the Syrian government in Douma to evacuate the wounded from the city to rebel territory in Idlib province. By this point, Faylaq al-Rahman rebels who were stranded in Douma during the offensive had already been evacuated along with hundreds of civilians. The same day, the SOHR reported a final agreement had also been reached for all rebels in Douma to be transferred to Jarabulus and Al-Bab in north-eastern Aleppo. But the political leader of Jaysh al-Islam denied that they made an evacuation deal with the Syrian government and insisted that only the injured were agreed to be evacuated. "Jaish al Islam has taken the decision to remain steadfast and the idea of leaving is not on the table," the official said. A local council member told the press that there was no deal for rebels to leave, only "humanitarian cases". The government threatened to storm the city if rebels did not agree to surrender.

The following day, buses arrived in Douma and the evacuation of the injured began with 1,100 rebels and their family members being transported out of the city over the next 24 hours. Some opposition activists reported that those evacuated were wounded fighters, while others said they were wounded civilians. Meanwhile, Jaysh al-Islam was reported to be divided over whether to fully evacuate the city, with hard-liners demanding they stay and fight.

Russian Lieutenant General Sergei Rudskoi told the Al-Watan newspaper on 4 April that Douma would be under the control of the Syrian government soon. Meanwhile, SOHR stated that about 2,350 Jaysh al-Islam fighters had been evacuated. A video posted on Jaysh al-Islam's social media accounts showed its religious committee's chairperson, Abu Abdelrahman Kaaka, confirm the deal and deny disagreement between their leadership and fighters. However, evacuations were suspended on the next day. SANA stated it was due to internal disagreements within Jaysh al-Islam. SOHR stated the disagreements occurred due to measures taken by Turkish troops in areas where rebels were arriving. SANA and opposition sources stated 650 rebels and civilians were evacuated on 4 April.

Russian and Syrian airplanes "heavily bombarded" Douma for the first time in 10 days on 6 April. SOHR stated that two civilians were killed; and SANA stated that it was in response to rebel shelling on Damascus, which had killed four. In the wake of the airstrikes, the Syrian government launched an air and ground offensive on Douma, with pro-government forces including Tiger Forces and Republican Guards advancing in the farms outside the town. Overall, according to SOHR, 48 civilians had died in the shelling of Douma by 7 April. The stated aim of the government advance was to force Jaysh Al-Islam to the negotiations table again. Military sources said Russian and Syrian jets bombed the town again that night during a hiatus in the ground assault, with airstrikes reported into the morning of the 7th.

==== Douma evacuation ====
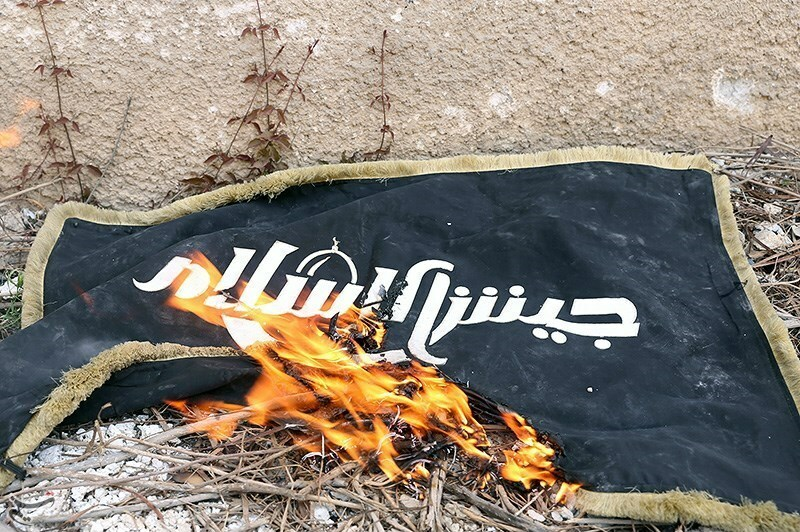
Government forces burn a flag of Jaysh al-Islam in Douma following the evacuation.

Government forces made advances in Douma's outskirts during 7 April, advancing from the west, east and south. According to pro-government sources, they made a significant advance in southern Douma, led by Tiger Forces, infiltrating Jaysh Al-Islam's primary line of defense near the Misraba axis, and had reached Douma's southern outskirts. Pro-government sources reported that on the eastern flank the army attempted to fully secure al-Rayhan, half of which was still under rebel control despite previous reports of capture by the military; Al-Rayhan had a high-density of rebel tunnels, well-disguised trenches and fire support positions on its western flank, offering stiff resistance to the army's advances - leaving about a dozen government tanks destroyed since the offensive began. Pro-government sources also reported the Syrian Army's usage of Iranian drones while striking Douma. By the afternoon, government sources reported the first residential buildings taken from the rebels by government troops led by Tiger Forces and loyalist Liwa al-Quds militia fighters. In the evening of the 7th, pro-government sources reported that "huge explosions rocked" Douma as the Syrian Army "resumed intensified shelling and airstrikes". Military sources said they finally halted airstrikes in the early hours of the 8th in order to restart negotiations with Jaysh Al-Islam.

During these airstrikes, a chemical attack occurred on the afternoon/evening of 7 April, with Union of Medical Relief Organisations and other NGOs and rebel groups accusing the government of perpetrating it. Syrian state media and Russia denied the accusations. The following day, according to the Syrian military, a new ceasefire was declared after government troops captured al-Rayhan. State media reported that Jaysh al-Islam had agreed to leave Douma. It added that buses had been dispatched to evacuate the rebels and the prisoners they had released under the deal. A bus carried dozens of rebels and their families to northern Syria while the first batch of the rebels' prisoners were released simultaneously.

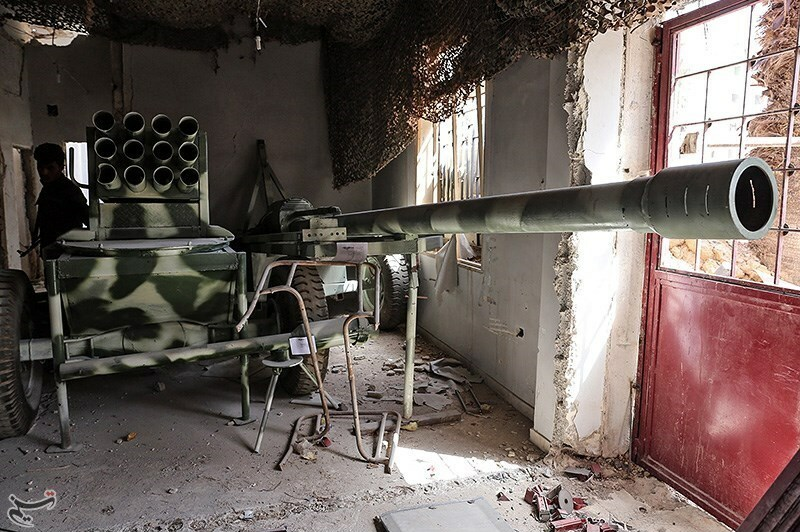
Rebel equipment left behind in Douma.

The next day, Russian military police visited the site of the alleged chemical attack. A video by local activists showed a Russian armored personnel carrier arriving at the building where the projectile containing the chemical agent had reportedly landed.

On 9 April, pro-government media reported that civilians stormed rebel warehouses that had been packed with food. Heavy gunfire was also reported during the day as the rebels tried to spend all of their ammunition; the rebels also burned their tanks, heavy weapons and other military vehicles as they were evacuating. They also released the remaining 100 out of 200 prisoners they had been holding in Douma. During the evacuation negotiations, according to pro-government sources, the rebels stated they had up to 5,000 prisoners. Other reports placed the number of prisoners between 3,500 and 5,000, but state TV cited an official source as saying the rebels had exaggerated the number in order to strengthen their position during negotiations. According to the pro-government outlet Al-Masdar, thousands of other prisoners were executed or thought to have died due to illness, hunger or fatigue while being forced to dig tunnels for the rebels. Interfax, citing the Russian military, stated that 2,000 rebels had left on 10 April, while 4,000 more were also preparing to leave Douma.

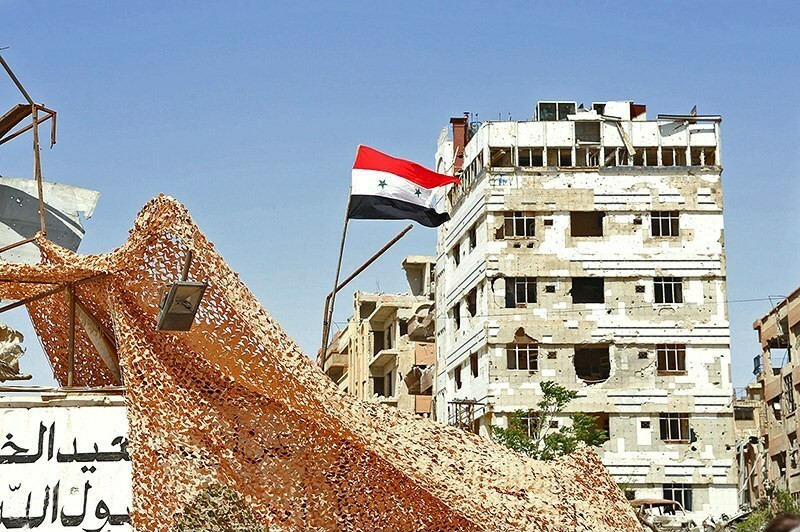
Syrian Arab Republic flag raised in Douma.

UN spokesman Stephane Dujarric stated that nearly 4,000 people were evacuated to Aleppo province on 11 April. Before leaving, the rebels surrendered their heavy weapons, while the leader of Jaysh al-Islam, Essam al-Buwaydhani, left the city in the evening. On 12 April, as the last of the rebels were leaving Douma, Russian news agencies reported that the Syrian Army had taken full control of the city, with the Syrian flag raised in a symbolic move in the town and Russia declaring the Syrian government's victory in Eastern Ghouta. Soon after, another batch of rebels left Douma. The Russian defense ministry stated that Russian military police had begun patrolling Douma as stipulated in the evacuation deal, while regular Syrian troops had yet to enter it.

SOHR reported that about 4,000 people were evacuated on 13 April. Hamza Bayraqdar, spokesman for Jaysh al-Islam, stated his fighters had all evacuated. Meanwhile, the Syrian Army denied they had entered Douma at the time. Around midnight between 13 and 14 April, about 100 buses evacuated the last batch of rebels and civilians, following which Russian and Syrian government forces took complete control of Douma.

State TV reported that Syrian police units had entered Douma in the morning of 14 April. This move brought the entire Eastern Ghouta under government control and effectively ended the near 7-year rebellion near Damascus. In the evening, the Syrian Army declared the eastern suburbs of Damascus "fully liberated".

== Humanitarian impact ==
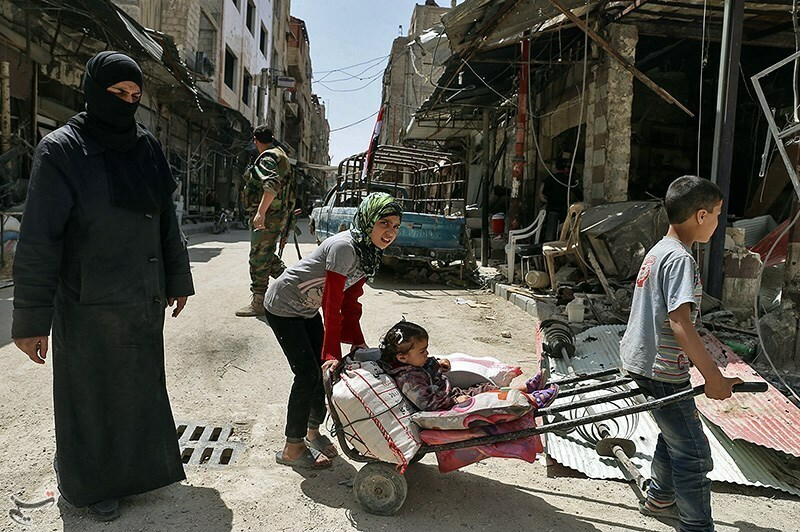
Civilians in Douma after the offensive.

250 people were reportedly killed within the first two days of the opening bombardment phase, the highest 48-hour death toll in the Syrian conflict since the 2013 chemical attack on eastern Ghouta. According to a medical worker, the situation forced doctors to use expired drugs, including anesthetics, because they had no other option.

On 21 February, SOHR reported 260 people had been killed since the night of 18 February, with 106 killed on 20 February alone. According to Doctors without Borders (MSF), 13 health facilities had been destroyed or damaged because of the airstrikes.

On 22 February, Panos Moumtzis, the UN humanitarian coordinator for Syria, reported that "80 percent of the population of the town of Harasta was living underground". The same day, the number of health facilities stricken had grown to 22 as medics and doctors stated that "the medical system in eastern Ghouta is near collapse", and that only three facilities remained fully operational. International organizations claimed there was "clear evidence that hospitals were deliberately targeted".

On 23 February, it was reported that one journalist, Abdul Rahman Ismael Yassin, died from injuries sustained in a 20 February airstrike. Between 18 and 24 February, more than 520 civilians were killed and 2,500 wounded in the Eastern Ghouta area due to the Syrian government and Russia's air and artillery strikes.

On 24 February, MSF warned that "casualty numbers in Syria's besieged East Ghouta enclave are soaring beyond imagination as the capacity to provide healthcare is in its final throes". The next day, according to SAMS-supported medical staff, one child was killed and 11 people suffered breathing problems due to an alleged chlorine attack.

On 2 March, two children managed to leave Eastern Ghouta under the cover of darkness via a humanitarian corridor, according to a Russian general. The general, speaking for the Russian Center for the Reconciliation of the Warring Sides, said the rebels repeatedly shelled the corridor intended for the exit of civilians from that area and were also keeping hostage the population in the rebel-controlled Eastern Ghouta, threatening to punish those wishing to leave. The same day, the UN High Commissioner for Human Rights said that the Syrian government air strikes and shelling on the Ghouta are "likely war crimes, and potentially crimes against humanity", while MSF stated that 15 out of 20 facilities supported by them in East Ghouta have been hit by bombing or shelling.

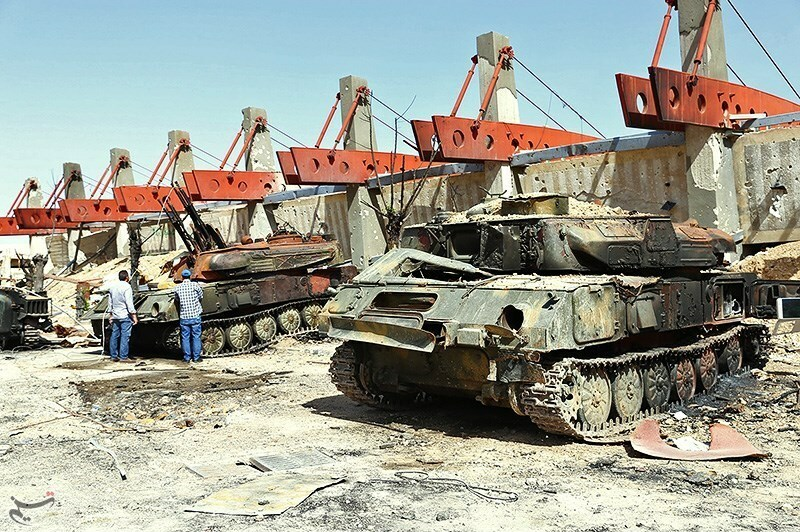
Destroyed armored vehicles in Douma after the offensive.

On 4 March, it was reported that thousands of civilians had fled advances by Syrian government forces in eastern Ghouta over the previous two days. According to a Russian military source, armed groups imposed a curfew and banned mass gatherings of people to prevent them from leaving the shrinking pocket. On 5 March, the rebels reportedly promised to allow civilians to leave the conflict zone, while 46 trucks carrying 247 tonnes of aid from the United Nations, the Red Cross and the Syrian Arab Red Crescent for almost 30,000 people went in to the pocket via the Al-Wafideen crossing. The World Health Organization said that the Syrian government officials removed trauma kits and surgical supplies from trucks, with 70% of supplies removed from aid trucks by the government. The convoy pulled out later after shelling, with UNHCR saying that 10 trucks had not been emptied. The Russian military said it had also evacuated 13 residents. The next day U.S. Department of State spokeswoman Heather Nauert commented on Twitter that "the Syrian regime is pilfering aid". Syrian government shelling and airstrikes killed 89 people during this day, making it the deadliest day there since the UN's Security Council demanded a cease-fire across Syria. Meanwhile, an aid worker from SOS Chrétiens d'Orient accused opposition fighters of deliberately targeting densely populated residential areas of Damascus city, with particular preference for the Christian borough of Bab Tuma within the Old City district.

On 7 March, activists in the residential town of Hamouriyah released videos appearing to show phosphorus bombs being dropped and many victims struggling to breathe. Syria's Deputy Foreign Minister Faisal Mekdad denied the reports during a press conference. Four days later, the White Helmets group said that the Syrian government hit Irbin with chlorine gas, phosphorus bombs and napalm.

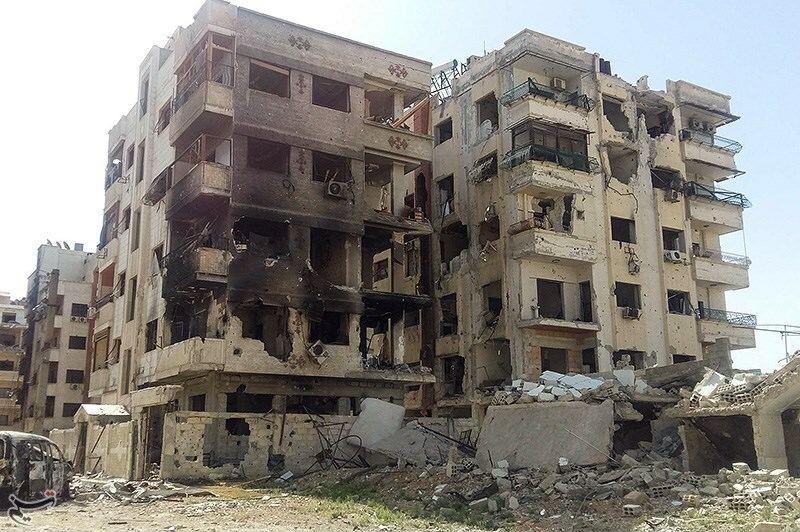
Destruction in Douma after the offensive.

In early to mid-March, the United Nations' human rights chief accused the Syrian government of orchestrating an "apocalypse" in Syria. MSF stated that in the eastern Ghouta "key items, particularly for surgery, have run out", and that "the majority of residents are living in basements and makeshift underground shelters, in unsanitary conditions with limited safe drinking water and often no hygiene or sanitation facilities". The United Nations' refugee agency representative to Syria, Sajjad Malik, said that the Eastern Ghouta was "on the verge of a major disaster" and there were dead bodies still in destroyed buildings.

On 14 March, a Russian general reported over 300 people had fled Eastern Ghouta for Damascus since the implementation of the humanitarian corridor on 27 February. The same day, the Russian Defence Ministry announced that 437 civilians had been evacuated from Douma and that a humanitarian convoy would deliver 137 tonnes of food to the area the next day. The next day, as government forces fought to fully capture Hamouriyah, thousands of civilians fled towards the government-held territory with at least 12,500 leaving on that day according to the SOHR. On 16 March 2018, between 12,000 and 13,000 people fled Eastern Ghouta, in what was reported as the largest one-day exodus in the country's seven-year war. By 24 March, over 105,000 people have been evacuated from eastern Ghouta, with Douma remaining the sole rebel stronghold after month-long fighting.

On 15 March, the China Central Television reported that the Syrian Army had discovered a chemical weapon workshop located within a farm previously under rebel control near the suburb of Douma.

== Peace efforts ==
On 22 February, in response to the Ghouta escalation, Sweden and Kuwait proposed a resolution at the UN Security Council (UNSC), consisting of a 30-day truce in Syria. The resolution was subsequently rejected by Russia. However, on 24 February, after about a week's worth of government bombardment operations, the UNSC unanimously approved a resolution demanding a 30-day ceasefire in Syria.

On 25 February, an Iranian General, Mohammad Bagheri, said that the truce did not cover parts of the Damascus suburbs "held by the terrorists" and that attacks would continue.

On 26 February, Russian president Vladimir Putin ordered a daily five-hour "humanitarian pause" in eastern Ghouta. The ceasefire was to start the next day from 9 a.m. until 2 p.m. local. In early March, a Russian offer of safe passage out of eastern Ghouta for the rebels and their family members was rejected by the rebels.

== National rebel responses to the offensive ==
On 2 March, Ansar al-Islam launched a raid in Hama to alleviate pressure from Ghouta and claimed to have killed 30 pro-government fighters at a checkpoint releasing a video showing the attack.

On 14 March, rebel groups of the Syrian Liberation Front, the Turkistan Islamic Party and Jaysh al-Izza launched a retaliatory military offensive in northwest Hama Governorate in response to the Syrian Army's Eastern Ghouta operation. Hours into the operation, after opening rocket attacks and artillery shelling on Syrian Army positions, rebel shock troops stormed and captured the town of Kernaz and most of Al-Hamameyah, forcing government forces to retreat. Syrian and Russian jets responded to the offensive with air strikes on rebel tactical positions. The Syrian Army launched a counterattack later that same day, successfully recapturing Karnaz and Al-Hamameyah, reversing all rebel gains.

== Aftermath ==
On 14 April, France, the United Kingdom and the United States launched airstrikes against four Syrian government targets in response to the chemical attack in Douma.

== International reactions ==
Involved parties

- Syria – The Foreign Ministry accused militants in Ghouta of targeting Damascus and using people as "human shields".

Supranational

- United Nations – "It's imperative to end this senseless human suffering now. Such targeting of innocent civilians and infrastructure must stop now," Panos Moumtzis, the UN's Regional Humanitarian Coordinator for the Syria Crisis said in a statement. Secretary General António Guterres appealed for an "immediate suspension of all war activities in eastern Ghouta." Speaking to the UN Security Council, he described residents as living in "hell on earth". United Nations human rights chief Zeid Ra'ad Al Hussein has said that "the Syrian regime and its foreign allies of planning their next apocalypse".
  - UNICEF – The reports of deaths of children prompted the children's agency to issue a blank statement with only a footnote. "No words will do justice to the children killed, their mothers, their fathers and their loved ones," UNICEF's Geert Cappelaere said in the footnote.
- EU - Vice President of the European Commission Federica Mogherini and fellow senior EU official Christos Stylianides released the following statement: "The European Union calls on all parties to the conflict, as well as the guarantors of the four De-Escalation Areas, to take all necessary measures to ensure the decrease of violence, the protection of the Syrian people by respecting International Humanitarian Law, and urgent humanitarian access. There is no military solution to the conflict, we call on all parties to seriously engage in the UN-led political process."

State

- France – President Emmanuel Macron said: "France clearly, vigorously, condemns what is taking place in eastern Ghouta." The foreign ministry issued a statement that read the attacks "deliberately target inhabited areas and civilian infrastructure, including medical ones. They constitute a grave violation of the international humanitarian law...these acts engage the responsibility of the Syrian regime, but also that of Russia and Iran, which are its main backers and who, in the framework of the Astana agreements, have vouched for a ceasefire that is supposed to apply to Ghouta."
- Germany – Chancellor Angela Merkel said: "The killing of children, the destruction of hospitals – all that amounts to a massacre that must be condemned and which must be countered with a clear no. That is something that we as Europeans need to work towards."
- Holy See – On 25 February, Pope Francis said that Syria was being "martyred" by the continued attacks "killing civilians in the eastern Ghouta district." He also called for an immediate end to violence and access to humanitarian aid.
- Iran – Deputy Foreign Minister Abbas Araghchi told the BBC's Lyse Doucet that Iran believed in a political solution to the conflict, not a military one. Iran says it is in close contact with Syria, Russia and Turkey to try to reduce tension in the Eastern Ghouta.
- Qatar – The Foreign Ministry issued a statement that read: "The State of Qatar expresses it's strong...condemnation of the massacres and intensive aerial bombardments carried out by the forces of the Syrian regime."
- Russia – Foreign Minister Sergei Lavrov said their reaction was an attack on "terrorism" and not directed at civilians. In keeping with the existing agreements, the fight against terrorism cannot be restricted by anything." Kremlin spokesman Dmitry Peskov said: "These are groundless accusations. We don't know what they are based on." The allegations "are not backed up with any specific information. We do not agree with them," he added.
- Saudi Arabia – The Ministry of Foreign Affairs issued a statement that read: "We stress the need for the Syrian regime's violence to end, and to have humanitarian aid and relief to enter. The political path to the crisis solution must be taken seriously, in accordance with the agreed principles of the Geneva Declaration 1 and the UN Security Council Resolution 2254."
- UAE – The Ministry of Foreign Affairs and International Cooperation issued a statement that read: "Syria has suffered enough through severe conflict and the systematic targeting of civilians and cannot bear more bloodshed.".
- United Kingdom – "The UK will press Russia to support a ceasefire to allow for the urgent delivery of humanitarian aid. Protecting Syrians and getting them the lifesaving aid they need must be paramount."
- United States – State Department spokeswoman Heather Nauert stated that the US is "deeply concerned" about the Syrian government's escalation of the siege on the enclave, denouncing what she called the "siege and starve tactics" of government forces.

Others

- Amnesty International, the London-based NGO, issued a statement that read: "International community still failing to act as 'war crimes on an epic scale' unfold in the besieged suburb of Damascus."

== See also ==
- Ghouta chemical attack
- Rif Dimashq offensive (September 2015)
- Rif Dimashq offensive (April–May 2016)
- Rif Dimashq Governorate campaign
