= South Africa–Syria relations =

- Syria: South Africa

South Africa–Syria relations refer to the current and historic relationship between the Republic of South Africa and the Syrian Arab Republic. The two countries established diplomatic relations on 1 June 1994 following the end of Apartheid. Syria maintains an embassy in Pretoria whilst South Africa maintains an embassy in Damascus.

During the Apartheid period Syria aligned with other Arab states in opposing South Africa through the United Nations. In September 1952 the Syrian government sent a letter to the UN Secretary General to place South Africa's Apartheid policies on the General Assembly agenda. South Africa's first post-Apartheid president, Nelson Mandela, visited Syria in 1999 during a Middle East trip that also included Iran and Jordan.

Following the outbreak of the Syrian Civil War in 2011 South Africa was supportive of the Assad regime, protecting it from international censure at the United Nations during Assad regime's suppression of peaceful unarmed protesters and opposing the debating of the Syrian crisis in the UN Human Rights Council during the 2018 Rif Dimashq offensive.

In the last three days before the fall of the Assad regime, the South African Department of International Relations indicated its support for the regime by stating that the South African government stood "in solidarity with the Government and people of the Syrian Arab Republic... [and] express [South Africa's] grave concern at the offensive attack in Aleppo and Idlib by Tahrir Al-Sham (HTS), which has been designated as a terrorist organisation by the UN Security Council, and a coalition of foreign mercenaries."

As of December 2024, South Africa continues to maintain a diplomatic presence in Syria.
