= East Ghouta inter-rebel conflict (April–May 2017) =

Armed conflict

- Part of the Rif Dimashq Governorate campaign, siege of eastern Ghouta and the inter-rebel conflict during the Syrian Civil War
Date	28 April – 31 May 2017 (1 month and 3 days)
Location	East Ghouta, Rif Dimashq Governorate, Syria
Result	Inconclusive

Belligerents
Jaysh al-Islam; Ahrar al-Sham (since 11 May); Glory Brigades (until 8 May, rejoined Al-Rahman Legion)	Hay'at Tahrir al-Sham; Al-Rahman Legion

Commanders and leaders
Qassem Qadesh † (Operations commander in Marj); Numan Awad (executed) (JaI military services chief) Col. Abu Muhammad al-Kurdi (high-ranking officer, defected from Rahman Legion)	Abu Ghazi † (HTS emir of Arbin); Capt. Abu Najib † (al-Rahman Legion office manager and deputy commander) Essam al-Qadi † (Al-Rahman Legion commander)

Units involved
Fajr al-Umma Brigade (Joined Ahrar al-Sham on 11 May 2017)	Al-Rahman Legion: Al-Bara Brigade; Glory Brigades (since 8 May, rejoined al-Rahman Legion)

Casualties and losses
67 killed, 15 captured	Unknown
- 13–30 civilians killed 400+ fighters and civilians killed overall

The East Ghouta inter-rebel conflict (April–May 2017) was an armed conflict between the rebel groups Hay'at Tahrir al-Sham and al-Rahman Legion on one side, and the rebel group Jaysh al-Islam on the other, which took place in the rebel-held territories east of Damascus. Open conflict between the groups also took place exactly one year earlier, before a ceasefire was implemented.

== Conflict ==
On 28 April, sounds of intense fighting echoed through several suburbs of Eastern Ghouta, with Jaysh al-Islam fighters assaulting Hay'at Tahrir al-Sham (HTS) and Rahman Legion forces. Jaysh al-Islam claimed that this happened due to these rebel groups preventing their convoys from reinforcing the Qaboun suburb. On the same day, the Syrian Observatory for Human Rights has reported that 40 rebel fighters from all sides were killed in the clashes, including a HTS Emir in Arbin. On 29 April, masked gunmen stormed a hospital operated by Médecins Sans Frontières in Hazzeh and forced the MSF to suspend activities in the area. On 30 April, Jaysh al-Islam announced that they were waging a full-scale operation against HTS and warned fighters belonging to the Rahman Legion to not support them, as of that day 95 people have been killed during the infighting, according to SOHR. However, the same day, HTS combatants allied with the Rahman Legion and Ahrar al-Sham stormed, and after intense clashes, captured the towns of Jisrin and Hazzeh. On the same day, around 3,000 residents in Arbin demonstrated against the rebel infighting. Jaysh al-Islam fighters opened fire on the protesters, killing a child and injuring 14 others.

During the first day of May, fighters of Jaysh al-Islam entered the town of Zamalka, engaging in fierce clashes with forces of the Rahman Legion and HTS. By the same day, more than 120 people were killed in the fighting. On 3 May, Jaysh al-Islam fighters recaptured the town of Beit Sawa from Faylaq al-Rahman, during the same day they also made a deal with the Syrian Army, according to which, 51 aid convoys entered Douma in exchange for Jaysh al-Islam release of hundreds predominantly Alawite citizens of Syria captured by the group throughout the years.

On 4 May, HTS and the Rahman Legion recaptured large parts of Arbin from Jaysh al-Islam. The next day, Jaysh al-Islam declared an end to its combat operations against HTS.

On 8 May, Jaysh al-Islam once again declared war on HTS and the Rahman Legion, with clashes resuming. Also on 8 May 2017, Glory Brigades rejoined the Rahman Legion after the Rahman Legion surrounded their headquarters in Hammouriyah two days ago.

On 11 May, the Rahman Legion raided the headquarters of Ahrar al-Sham in Arbin and captured 15 of their fighters. This was followed by clashes. On the same day, the Fajr al-Umma Brigade announced its accession into Ahrar al-Sham. Two days later, a fighter of the Rahman Legion attacked a medical center in Maliha and opened fire on the people inside. A medical worker was shot and injured. On 15 May, Jaysh al-Islam fighters stormed Hay'at Tahrir al-Sham and Faylaq al-Rahman bases in Beit Sawa and Al-Asha'ari setting off intense firefights. The same day, Jaysh al-Islam also made progress against Faylaq al-Rahman in the outskirts of Hamouriyah, with numerous casualties on both sides.

On 30 May, a new round of clashes ensued between the warring factions as Jaysh al-Islam captured the Ashari farms from HTS and the Rahman Legion. The next day, Jaysh al-Islam attempted to fully secure the Ashari area, but a counter-attack by the Rahman Legion forced Jaysh al-Islam to retreat from the Ashari farms. Pro-government media claimed that Jaysh al-Islam resorted to deploying child fighters against rival groups in Eastern Ghouta pocket, with at least two fighters under 16 years of age being killed during the clashes at Ashari farms.

== Aftermath ==
On 6 June, the Syrian Army managed to cut off Tal Farzat-al-Nashabiyah supply route for Jaysh al-Islam, thus further complicating their situation. A month later, Jaysh al-Islam decided to use a situation created by the Syrian Army offensive in Jobar and Ayn Tarma, which resulted in Faylaq al-Rahman and Hay'at Tahrir al-Sham diverting their fighters to fight the Syrian Army, to storm the positions of aforementioned rebel groups in the towns of Beit Sawa and Al-Ashari.

On 22 July 2017, the Russian Ministry of Defense announced that a de-escalation agreement had been signed for Eastern Ghouta in Cairo following a talks between Russian military officials and Jaysh al-Islam.

On 6 August 2017, 120 Ahrar al-Sham fighters in Arbin defected to the Rahman Legion after internal disputes. Ahrar al-Sham accused the Rahman Legion of seizing their weapons, while the Rahman Legion accused Ahrar al-Sham of their attempt to implement their "failed" experience from northern Syria in eastern Ghouta. Hay'at Tahrir al-Sham reportedly sided with Ahrar al-Sham against the Sham Legion during the clashes. A ceasefire agreement between the Rahman Legion and Ahrar al-Sham was implemented on 9 August.

On 16 August, a Failaq al Rahman representative and a Russian representative signed an agreement in Geneva city that established Failaq al Rahman's inclusion in the de-escalation zone in Eastern Ghouta, to come into effect at 21:00 on 18 August.

SOHR reported that government bombing resumed in Eastern Ghouta on 27 September 2017.

In February 2018, the Syrian army launched an operation to dislodge rebels from the area. In early March 2018, the Syrian army had captured 59% of the Eastern Ghouta pocket. On 7 April 2018, at least 48 people were reportedly killed in a chemical attack in Douma, which resulted in an armed response from the United States, France, and the United Kingdom. On 14 April 2018, the Syrian Army officially declared Eastern Ghouta to be free of militants, securing it under government control.
