= Syrian Special Mission Forces =

Quick reaction force of the Ministry of Interior

- قوات المهام الخاصة السورية
- Active: 2014–2024
- Country: Ba'athist Syria
- Branch: Ministry of Interior
- Type: Quick reaction force
- Garrison/HQ: Damascus
- Engagements: Syrian Civil War: Qalamoun offensive (2014); Rif Dimashq offensive (June–October 2016); Battle of al-Hasakah (2016); Aleppo offensive (November–December 2016); 2017 Jobar offensive; Battle of Harasta (2017–2018)

Commanders
- Last Commander: Major General Bassel al-Shaker

Insignia
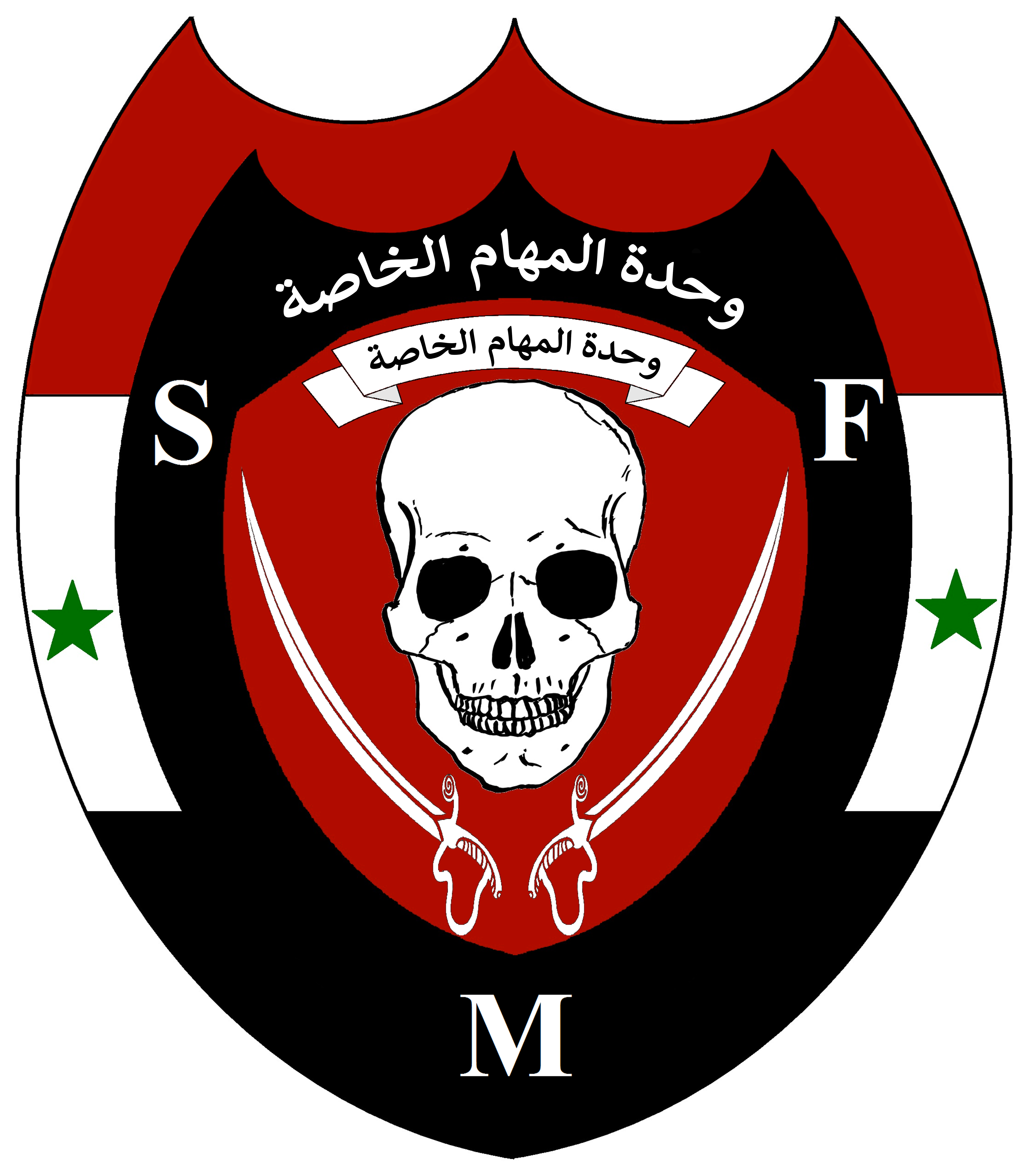
- Former Logo

The Syrian Special Mission Forces (Arabic: وحدة المهام الخاصة) was a quick reaction force of the Ministry of Interior of formerly Ba'athist Syria. They were tasked with defending against attacks on government-controlled parts of Aleppo and Damascus, and other urban settings.

== Equipment ==
The unit received military training and weapons from Russia. The unit was comparable to the Russian ODON. The SSMF used Russian-supplied AK-103 and AK-104 as the main service rifles; the former main rifles were the AK-47 and most likely, the AKM as well. From 2023 to 2024, SMF also used Iranian copy of the M4 carbine, Fajr 224.

According to Al-Masdar News, the Special Mission Forces were mainly, although not exclusively, intended for urban security actions, as well as carrying out force protection and security operations against terrorist activities.

== Battles ==
Al-Masdar News reported in 2017 that the force had foiled attacks by terrorists in the western suburbs and the Old City of Aleppo. Not limited to city defense, the Syrian Special Mission Forces attacked behind enemy lines during the Syrian Army's siege of Eastern Ghouta. They had more experience than the National Defence Forces, with many having served as military officers, some with experience in the Syrian special forces. At the time, it was anticipated that after the war was over and the conflict in the area dissipated, they would help contribute to the rebuilding of Syria.

== See also ==
- Law enforcement in Syria
- Syrian Public Security Police
