= Al-Rahman Legion =

Syrian Rebel Group

Al-Rahman
- فيلق الرحمن; Faylaq al-Rahman
- Official logo of the al-Rahman Legion Alternative logo of the Al-Rahman Corps
- Leaders: Capt. Abdul Nasr Shamir (a.k.a. Abu Nasr, commander in chief); Abu Ali Dhiya al-Shaghouri † (chief of staff); Mutasim Shamir (political bureau leader); Capt. Samer Salah (Abu Najib) †; Wael Alwan (spokesman)
- Dates active: November 2013–2025
- Groups: Al-Bara Brigade; Glory Brigades; Abu Musa al-Shari Brigade; Ajnad al-Sham Islamic Union (Eastern Ghouta branch); Al-Habib al-Mustafa Brigade; 101st Battalion
- Active regions: Eastern Damascus, Damascus Governorate; eastern Ghouta (until 31 March 2018); Eastern Qalamoun Mountains, Rif Dimashq Governorate (until April 2018); Turkish-occupied northern Aleppo Governorate (since April 2018)
- Ideology: Sunni Islamism
- Size: 2,000 -3,000 (2015); 9,000 (2018)
- Part of: (Syrian opposition) Free Syrian Army; Unified Military Command of Eastern Ghouta (2014–2015); Syrian National Army (since April, 2018)
- Wars: the Syrian Civil War

The Al-Rahman Legion (Arabic: فيلق الرحمن, Faylaq al-Raḥmān), also known as the Al-Rahman Corps, was a Free Syrian Army rebel group that operated in Eastern Ghouta on the outskirts of Damascus, and in the eastern Qalamoun Mountains. It was the main rebel group in Jobar, and was backed by Qatar. The group's leader was Abdul al-Nasr Shamir, a former Syrian Army officer from rural Homs who defected from the Syrian Army in early 2012.

The Legion has been described as an "Islamist" organization. It describes itself as "a revolutionary military entity aiming for the downfall of the Syrian regime, but not seeking to create an Islamic state". In 2016, it was described as "one of the oldest standing opposition factions in Damascus and maintains high levels of local legitimacy and support." Under a surrender agreement, over 5,000 of its fighters and associated civilians left Damascus for northwestern Syria in March 2018.

== History ==
=== 2014-2015 ===
The al-Rahman Legion was part of the Unified Military Command of Eastern Ghouta, established in 2014, along with Jaysh al-Islam (led by Zahran Alloush) and Ahrar al-Sham. Al-Rahman Legion and Jaysh al-Islam were allied in the Rif Dimashq offensive (September 2015), or the battle of "Allah al-Ghalib", around Tall Kurdi, Adra, and Harasta in Eastern Ghouta. However, after Alloush's death in late 2015 there were conflicts between Jaysh al-Islam and al-Rahman; Ahrar ash-Sham remained neutral.

=== 2016 ===
On 18 February 2016, Ajnad al-Sham Islamic Union fighters based in eastern Ghouta announced the "full incorporation" of its fighters into al-Rahman Legion, though reiterating that its fighters based in the western Damascus suburbs of Darayya and Moadammiyyeh as well as in southern Damascus would still operate under the Ajnad al-Sham Islamic Union banner and were not a part of this merger.

From 18 April until 24 May 2016, the Legion was involved in heavy clashes with rival rebel faction Jaysh al-Islam, while also fighting against government forces in the Rif Dimashq offensive (April–May 2016). On 26 April 2016, the 1st Brigade of Damascus (then an FSA-affiliated group armed with BGM-71 TOW missiles) left the Southern Front and joined the Legion. However, it left some time later.

On 24 May 2016, leaders of Jaysh al-Islam and al-Rahman Legion met to sign a Qatari-backed deal to end hostilities after the East Ghouta inter-rebel conflict (April–May 2016), supervised by Riyad Farid Hijab. On 14 June 2016, clashes erupted again, with the al-Rahman Legion taking control of several zones previously held by Jaysh al-Islam in the southern part of Eastern Ghouta.

In late July 2016, the al-Nusra Front clashed with the al-Rahman Legion in Zamalka, Markaz Rif Dimashq District over a dispute about Friday prayers in one of the mosques of Zamalka town. In this period, the Legion was among the combatants in the Rif Dimashq offensive (June–October 2016).

On August 2nd 2016, a conference was organised by the association of journalists in the eastern Ghouta to publicize a "One Army" initiative, with a large attendance of institutions and civilian actors, and Army of Islam commander Essam Boidani.

Six days later, on August 8th 2016, Colonel Abdel Nasser Shamir, the leader of the legion at the time faced an assassination after a meeting with the Army of Islam talking about the initiative. He quoted that after the meeting finished and leadership left, an armed group surrounded the base and opened fire aiming to storm the area. The clash was fought with small arms, and injured two legionary commanders, while the rest of the assembly ran through an underground emergency exit.

On 21 October 2016, fighters from the al-Rahman Legion opened fire on protesters demanding the formation of a joint military operations room between Jaysh al-Islam and the Rahman Legion. Up to 5,000 people attended the protests throughout eastern Ghouta. Less than a week later, the Glory Brigades seceded from the Rahman Legion, making it the 9th rebel group to leave the legion since the start of the war. Previously several of these groups have seceded in order to join the Ajnad al-Sham Islamic Union and the now defunct Jaysh al-Ummah.

=== 2017 ===
In February 2017, the head of the Rahman Legion's political council, Mutasim Shamir, attended peace talks in Geneva.

Between February and May 2017, the Legion was targeted by the government's Qaboun offensive. In March 2017, the Legion clashed with government forces in Jobar.

From April 2017, heavy clashes restarted between Jaysh al-Islam and the Rahman Legion, backed by Tahrir al-Sham (HTS). More than 95 rebels from both sides were killed, among them a captain of the Rahman Legion. On 2 May, Colonel Abu Muhammad al-Kurdi of the Rahman Legion defected to Jaysh al-Islam.

On 8 May 2017, the Glory Brigades rejoined the Rahman Legion after the latter surrounded the former's headquarters in Hamouriyah for 2 days.

In June, government forces started an offensive against the Legion in Jobar, which lasted until mid-August. Government sources claimed 400 rebels were killed during the first month of the offensive.

In July 2017, increasing tensions were reported between the Legion and its former ally HTS in eastern Ghouta. On 6 August 2017, 120 Ahrar al-Sham fighters in Arbin defected to the Rahman Legion after internal disputes. Ahrar al-Sham accused the Rahman Legion of seizing their weapons, while the Rahman Legion accused Ahrar al-Sham of their attempt to implement their "failed" experience from northern Syria in eastern Ghouta. Tahrir al-Sham reportedly sided with Ahrar al-Sham against the Rahman Legion during the clashes. A ceasefire agreement between the Rahman Legion and Ahrar al-Sham was implemented on 9 August.

In August 2017 in Geneva, the Legion signed a deal with Russia to join the de-escalation area in eastern Ghouta, brokered by Russia, Turkiye and Iran. However, in September 2017, there were reports of clashes between the Legion and government forces in Jobar.

The Legion was involved, alongside Ahrar al-Sham, in the Battle of Harasta, November 2017-January 2018.

=== 2018 ===
In February 2018, government forces launched a large-scale offensive to recapture eastern Ghouta from rebel groups, including the Rahman Legion. By March, the rebel pocket in eastern Ghouta was split into three, with the southern pocket of Hamouriyah being controlled by the Legion. Al-Rahman fighters withdrew from Hamouriyah to Ein Tarma by 15 March. On 23 March, the Legion reached a surrender agreement with Russia, and began to evacuate its fighters and their families from Zamalka, Arbin, Ein Tarma, and Jobar the next day. A convoy of more than 5,400 rebel fighters and civilians departed the pocket on 25 March, reaching northwestern Syria the next day.

=== 2019 ===
In 2019, the Al-Rahman Legion was brought up after being caught smuggling Hebrew manuscripts into Mardin, Turkiye, with one suspect being arrested. On March 26, Turkish Security Forces seized a Torah, in the northern portion of Samsun Province.

== External support ==
Al-Rahman Legion was supported by Qatar. Qatari-backed Al-Rahman Legion has been fighting Saudi Arabian-backed Jaysh al-Islam. The group was actively using American BGM-71 TOW anti-tank missiles.

Turkey supported the group, but in 2020 it suspended the support to them, because they refused to obey Turkiye's order to send fighters into Libya. A few militants of the group went on to fight in Libya anyway, despite the rejection of their commanders.

== See also ==
- List of armed groups in the Syrian Civil War
