= Rif Dimashq offensive (April–May 2016) =

Syrian Army offensive in 2016

- Part of the Syrian Civil War
| Date | 25 April –19 May 2016 (3 weeks and 3 days) |
| Location | Eastern Ghouta, Rif Dimashq Governorate, Syria |
| Result | Major Syrian Army/Hezbollah victory |
| Territorial changes | Army and Hezbollah capture the southern section of the rebel-held East Ghouta, including the rebel strongholds of Deir al-Asafir and Zabdin |

Belligerents
| (Syria) Syrian Arab Republic: Syrian Armed Forces; National Defense Force; Palestine Liberation Army; Hezbollah Guardians of the Dawn | Free Syrian Army; Islamic Front; Al-Nusra Front |

Units involved
| Syrian Army; Republican Guard; 102nd Brigade | Free Syrian Army; Al-Rahman Legion; Islamic Front; Jaysh al-Islam |

The Rif Dimashq offensive (April–May 2016) was a Syrian Army offensive in the Rif Dimashq Governorate, that was launched in late April 2016, as part of the Syrian Civil War. The offensive resulted in the military's capture of the southern section of the rebel-held East Ghouta, as government forces exploited concurrent large-scale rebel infighting in East Ghouta that left around 500 rebels dead.

== The offensive ==
On the evening of 25 April, government forces captured the entire Bala Al-Kadhima region, approaching the villages of Harasta Al-Qantara and Hawsh Jarabo. With this, the rebel-held Eastern Ghouta pocket, east of Damascus, was almost split in two and the rebels in Deir Al-‘Assafir and Zibdeen were close to being cut off.

On 29 April, the Army launched its second phase of the offensive, with an attack on Rukabiyah, seizing the southern part of the village within an hour. By the end of the day, the village was mostly secured. Shortly after, a 24-hour ceasefire was agreed upon in the area, with government troops receiving orders to withdraw from Rukabiyah. The next evening, the offensive restarted and the military once again entered Rukabiyah, taking 80 percent of the village. On 1 May, the military completely secured Rukabiyah, after which the ceasefire was renewed for another 24 hours.

Following the capture of Rukabiyah, the third planned phase of the offensive envisioned an assault against the rebel stronghold of Deir al-Asafir. On 8 May, government forces captured parts of the town of Zabdin.

On 11 May, government troops advanced from Rukabiyah and captured its farms. The next day, they launched a push, from the areas they had taken control of since the start of the offensive, towards Deir al-Asafir and into the parts of Zabdin that were still rebel-controlled, taking the village of Nolah, as well as positions near the Deir al-Asafir farms. The Army also reportedly seized Zabdin's mosque.

On 14 May, the Army and Hezbollah reportedly reached Deir al-Asafir and imposed fire control over the town, after they seized the village of Hawsh Al-Khatib. Shelling of Deir al-Asafir started on 17 May.

On 17 May, government forces took control of the Bazinah farms and half of the village of Bazinah. The next day, the rebels recaptured positions in Bazinah they had lost the previous day, however, several hours later the military took full control of the village.

On the morning of 19 May, government forces took full control of Deir al-Asafir and shortly after entered the northeastern part of Zabdin, advancing to within 250 south of the Bala Air Defense Battalion base. Elsewhere, the Army made other rapid advances, capturing two villages, as rebel defenses collapsed. By the end of the day, Zabdin was captured and the Army and Hezbollah cleared the whole southern section of East Ghouta, which represented some 20 percent of the rebel-held East Ghouta pocket.

With the success of the offensive, government troops were in control of most of the agricultural Marj region, which had been the biggest agricultural storehouse for East Ghouta. Due to this, some speculated that people inside the rebel-held East Ghouta pocket would starve and that the blockade would intensify. Hundreds of families were displaced from the valuable farmland, that nourished residents trapped in the blockaded area, as government forces advanced.

Following the capture of the area, the Army discovered a large network of tunnels connecting different villages and towns that contained large amounts of weapons, ammunition, medical supplies and communication equipment.

== Aftermath ==
On 20 May, the rebels recaptured Harasta Al-Qantara, as well as the nearby Bazinah farms. It was later reported the rebels were pushed out of the Bazinah farms, while on 21 May, the military launched an assault against Harasta Al-Qantara and reportedly recaptured its farms while fighting in the village continued.

On the evening of 28 May, the 416th Regiment of the Republican Guard, along with Hezbollah and the PLA, attacked the villages of Al-Bahariyah and Al-Nashabiyah, in another region of East Ghouta. During the assault, government forces broke through the rebel defense line south of Al-Nashabiyah, crossing the Barada River, and entered the village as the rebels withdrew to the village center. Meanwhile, government troops advanced on the eastern axis towards Al-Bahariyah's center. Two days later, the military crossed the river at another point west of Al-Nashabiyah, seizing the Military Airbase Construction Battalion at Beit Na’em village. Later that evening, they entered the village itself and broke through the first line of defense at nearby Al-Muhammadiyah, breaching the central region of East Ghouta for the first time since 2012. On 1 June, the military cut the supply line between Al-Muhammadiyah and Beit Na’em.

On the evening of 6 June, the Army blew up a large tunnel network connecting the Bala Farms with Al-Muhammadiyah and Beit Na’em. In all, nine tunnels were destroyed. Two days later, government troops entered Al-Muhammadiyah, capturing 20 houses, although most of the village still remained in rebel hands. Additionally, between 11 and 12 June, they advanced in Jisreen's and Al-Muhammadiyah's farms. Also, on 14 June, the military captured the farmlands to the west of Hawsh al-Farah, cutting the rebel supply route to the rebel-held parts of Tal al-Sawwan.

At the end of June, a new Army offensive was launched at the far eastern section of Eastern Ghouta.

== See also ==
- East Ghouta inter-rebel conflict (April–May 2016)
