= Qaboun offensive (2017) =

Military operation

- Part of the Rif Dimashq Governorate campaign (Syrian Civil War)
- Battle map of Damascus as of 30 May 2017
Date	18 February – 29 May 2017 (3 months, 1 week and 4 days)
Location	Qaboun, Barzeh and Jobar, Damascus, Syria
Result	Syrian government victory: Syrian Army repels an attempted rebel counterattack from Jobar; Rebels and family members are transported from Qaboun and Barzeh to the Idlib Governorate, after which the Syrian Army takes control of the neighborhoods

Belligerents
(Syria) Syrian Government; Hezbollah; Iran; Russia; Palestine Liberation Army Harakat Hezbollah al-Nujaba	Hay'at Tahrir al-Sham (surrendered) (Syrian opposition) Free Syrian Army (surrendered) (until 7 May); Fajr al-Ummah (surrendered) (until 7 May) Ahrar al-Sham (surrendered) (until 7 May) Jaysh al-Islam (surrendered) (from 28 April)

Commanders and leaders
(Syria) Brig. Gen. Ali Mahmoud (Syria) Col. Ghiath Dalla	Abu Taha Ali † (HTS's Qaboun commander) (Syrian opposition) Capt. Ward (surrendered) (1st Brigade commander) (Syrian opposition) 1st Lt. Hamzah Qiziz (surrendered) (al-Rahman Legion commander) Abou Ammar Al-Ghaith † (17th Brigade commander)

Units involved
Syrian Armed Forces; Syrian Army; 4th Mechanized Division; 42nd Brigade; Republican Guard; 105th Brigade; 106th Brigade; National Defence Forces; Golan Regiment; Syrian Air Force	(Syrian opposition) Free Syrian Army; Al-Rahman Legion; 1st Brigade of Damascus (surrendered)

Casualties and losses
82 killed (per SOHR; 19–24 March); 165–243 killed (per Bellingcat; 24 March – 15 May)	115 killed (per SOHR; 19–24 March) 800+ killed (per gov.)
- 93+ civilians killed and 100+ wounded (per FSA)

The Qaboun offensive (2017) was a military operation of the Syrian Arab Army in the suburbs of Damascus against rebel forces during the Syrian Civil War. Its intended goal was to capture the Damascus suburbs of Qaboun and Barzeh from rebels led by Hay’at Tahrir al-Sham (HTS).

== Background ==
In 2014, the rebel-held neighborhoods of Qaboun, Barzeh and Tishreen reached official or semi-official truces with government forces, including some government provision of some amenities (electricity and water) and rebel forces granting access to a strategic road through Barzeh and to the Tishreen Military Hospital. After the government's victory in Eastern Aleppo in late 2016, however, its forces turned their attention to the Damascus suburbs, for instance targeting Wadi Barada, and in particular seeking to move into the eastern Ghouta. It was in this context that government forces launched their offensive on Qaboun and the other eastern suburbs.

== The offensive ==
=== Initial artillery shelling and negotiations ===
Starting on 18 February, the Syrian Arab Army, supported by Hezbollah fighters, launched rockets and heavy artillery fire on rebel positions in the area. Almost immediately, negotiations started between the government and the area's representatives for a rebel surrender. A ground attack had not begun yet. Following the rebels' refusal to surrender, Army shelling of rebel positions resumed on 24 February.

=== Ground assault ===
Map of the battle

On 26 February, a ground assault was started with the Army reportedly capturing the majority of the farm area between Qaboun and Barzeh. After this, a week-long artillery campaign was started.

Following the artillery bombardment, on 5 March, two brigades advanced from two flanks and swept through the entire groves area between the Harasta and Qaboun areas, reaching the first residential areas of Qaboun. The same day, the rebels shelled the surrounding government-held districts. The next day, according to the Army, a new surrender offer was put forward to the rebels, which was once again refused and military operations continued.

On 10 March, the Army attacked Qaboun from the west and advanced 700 meters. They reported the capture of numerous building blocks and a weapons depot, as well as reaching the downtown of the suburb. Two days later, government troops reportedly captured a Free Syrian Army (FSA) prison in the outskirts of Qaboun, as they also seized the road between Qaboun and Barzeh, bringing them close to cutting the connection between the two districts.

On 13 March, government forces reportedly captured three mosques in the northeast of Qaboun and most of an area around a fourth mosque in the southeast of the neighborhood. Four days later, the Army assaulted a dairy factory in Qaboun and after several hours of fighting secured it as well as some other points in the suburb. On 18 March, the Syrian Army reported that it had infiltrated the rebel's defenses in Qaboun and seized an FSA brigade headquarters.

=== Rebel attack from Jobar ===
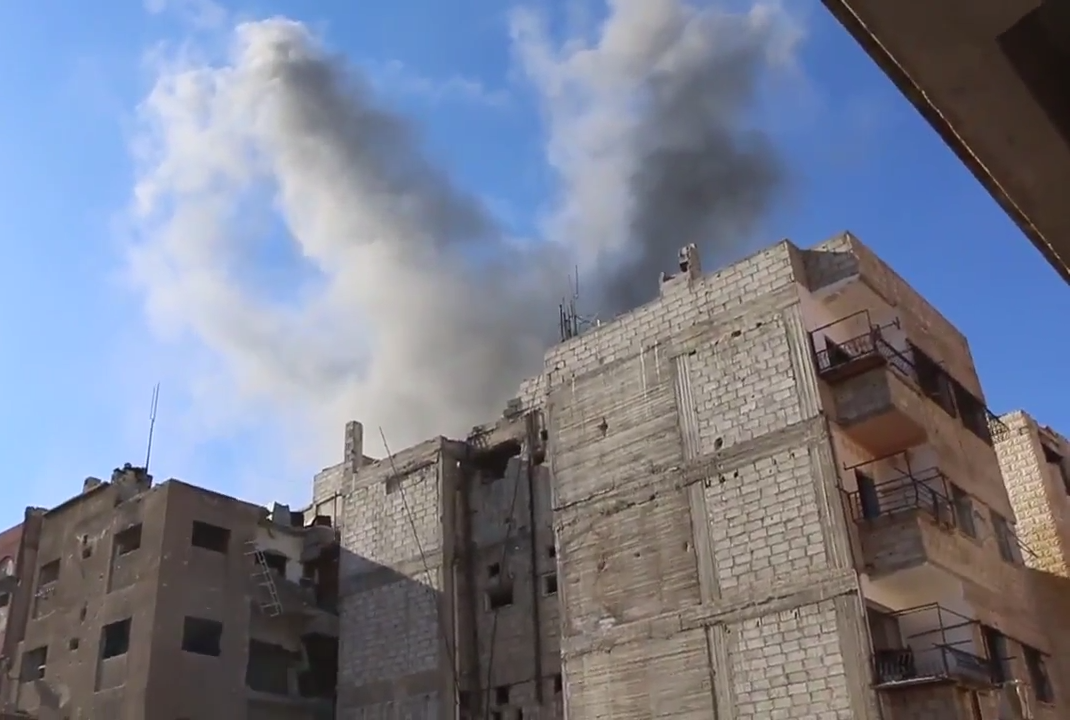
Smoke rises from a building in Jobar after being hit by a bomb during the rebel counter-offensive.

On 19 March, rebel forces from outside the Qaboun and Barzeh pocket launched an attack to relieve pressure on the besieged rebels by linking the Jobar district with Qaboun and Barzeh. The rebel offensive included HTS, FSA and FSA-affiliated Failaq al Rahman fighters. Rebels from inside Jobar launched the attack on Army positions close to the Qaboun front, with fighting concentrated on the Karash-Jobar axis. The specific area targeted by the rebels was the Abbasiyin district. Over the course of the day, rebel fighters seized several buildings before advancing into the Abbasid Square area – the first time in two years that the opposition had advanced so close to the capital's centre. HTS fighters sent two suicide car-bombers (VBIEDs), after which they reportedly detonated a tunnel bomb. The rebels also infiltrated the Army positions through tunnels in the middle of the night. Central Damascus was shelled by the rebels during the assault. The siege of Qaboun was temporarily broken after the Syrian army withdrew from a few points in order to avoid being overwhelmed by the rebels. The rebels managed to capture several industrial sites and buildings. However, soon after, the military launched a counter-attack, which involved 37 air-strikes. During the counter-attack, the military recaptured an electrical facility and marched on towards the Mercedes workshop. Intense clashes continued to rage through the night at the strategic Abbasiya Garage, which was eventually recaptured by the Army. Over the course of the day, SOHR recorded the deaths of 26 soldiers and 21 rebels and jihadists.

By early on 20 March, the Syrian Army had reversed all, or at least most, of the rebels' gains after 16 hours of fierce fighting. The rebels reportedly continued to hold several points in an industrial zone. According to the military, 72 soldiers and 80–100 rebel fighters were killed, the former mostly due to the suicide bombings. The pro-opposition activist group the SOHR reported 38 soldiers and 34 rebels were killed. Overall, government forces launched more than 400 artillery shells and rockets, as well as more than 80 air-strikes during the heavy fighting.

On 21 March, the rebels started a new assault, launching a suicide VBIED attack. The suicide attack was foiled before it reached its target, but still the rebels managed to fracture Army defenses and once again capture the Fabric Factory after two hours of clashes. Subsequently, the Syrian Army with support from the NDF started a new counter-attack which was initially repelled. However, a later Army assault, which involved a tunnel bombing of rebel positions, led to the military's recapture of the Fabric Factory along with several buildings as the rebels were forced to retreat eastward. The army declared that all rebel gains were fully reversed by 24 March.

During this phase of the fighting, 116 pro-government deaths were reported, with estimates as high as 189.

=== Restart of Army operations in Qaboun and Barzeh ===
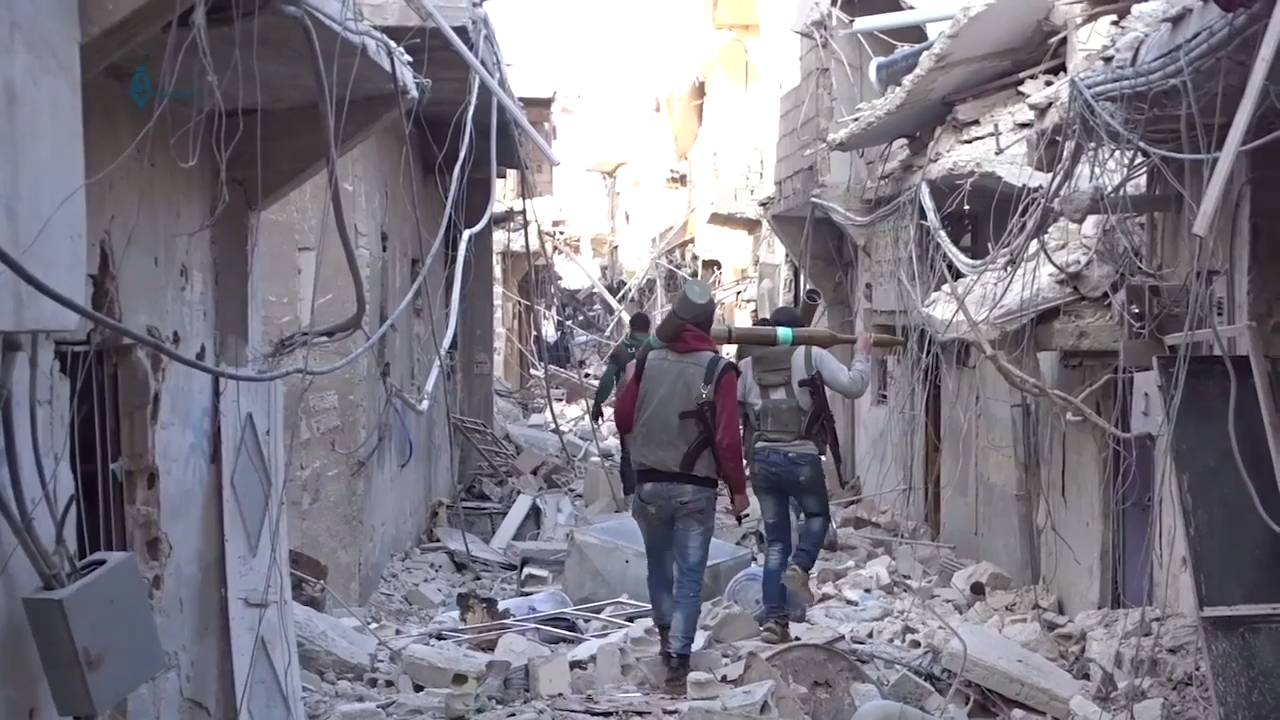
Rebels walk through a destroyed street in Qaboun.

At the end of March, the 105th Brigade of the Republican Guard seized some 10 buildings in the north-western part of Jobar. At the start of April, Army operations in Qaboun were renewed and government troops reportedly seized five buildings blocks in the southeastern part of the district in one day. They had also discovered three rebel tunnels, with one being wide enough to fit in vehicles.

On 3 April, government forces made significant progress in both Qaboun and Barzeh, capturing a substantial section of Al-Tahrib Souq Street in Qaboun, as well as most of Barzeh. However, a subsequent rebel counter-attack regained all lost ground in Barzeh. Still, the Army managed to capture the Hafez road, a strategic artery between Qaboun and Barzeh, and thus besieging Barzeh. In the following days, fighting continued in the Tishreen area of Qaboun, as well as along the Al-Tahrib Souq Street.

One week later, the military made advances in the outskirts of Qaboun in the al-Baalah Farms. In addition, on 12 April, the Army seized a strategic rebel tunnel in Qaboun that was used for resupplying. Further advances took place on 17 April, when the military captured at least 15 building blocks in Qaboun. On 18 April, the Syrian Army reportedly captured a rebel prison in Qaboun and freed 34 prisoners held by the rebels. Five days later, more advances saw the military seize the Qaboun Power Company facilities and the Al-Hussein Mosque.

=== Rebel split and infighting; Surrender of Qaboun and Barzeh ===
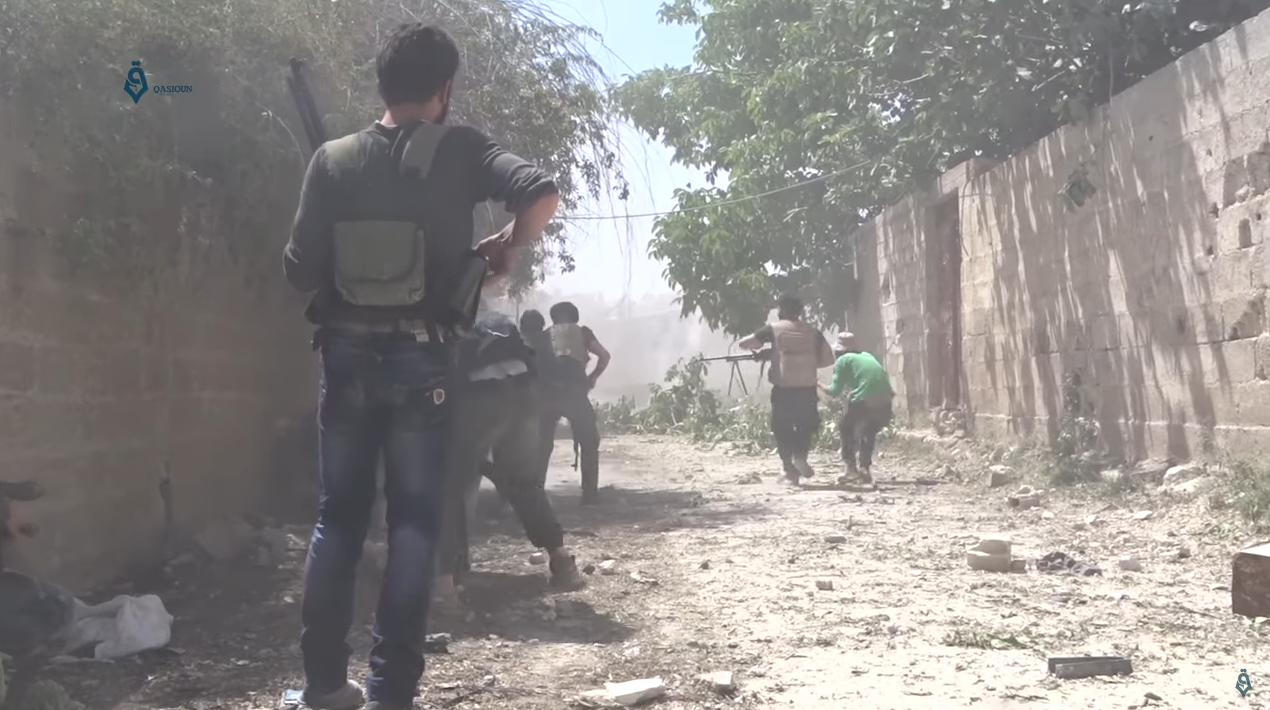
Rebels in combat in Qaboun

On 28 April, intense inter-factional fighting erupted in the Eastern Ghouta, with Jaysh al-Islam fighters assaulting HTS and Faylaq Al-Rahman forces. Jaysh al-Islam claimed that this happened due to these rebel groups preventing their convoys from reinforcing the Qaboun suburb. Concurrently, the Army once again advanced in Qaboun.

As the inter-rebel conflict continued into May, government forces reportedly broke through the rebel's last line of defense in the southeastern section of Qaboun, capturing a large number of building blocks. On 7 May, the Army was still advancing in Qaboun when the military suspended its operations after the rebels agreed to surrender and start negotiating to evacuate the district. At the same time, a deal was also announced to transport the rebels from Barzeh. On 8 May, the evacuation of Barzeh started with 1,500 rebels and their family members set to leave during the day. More were expected to be transported in the coming days.

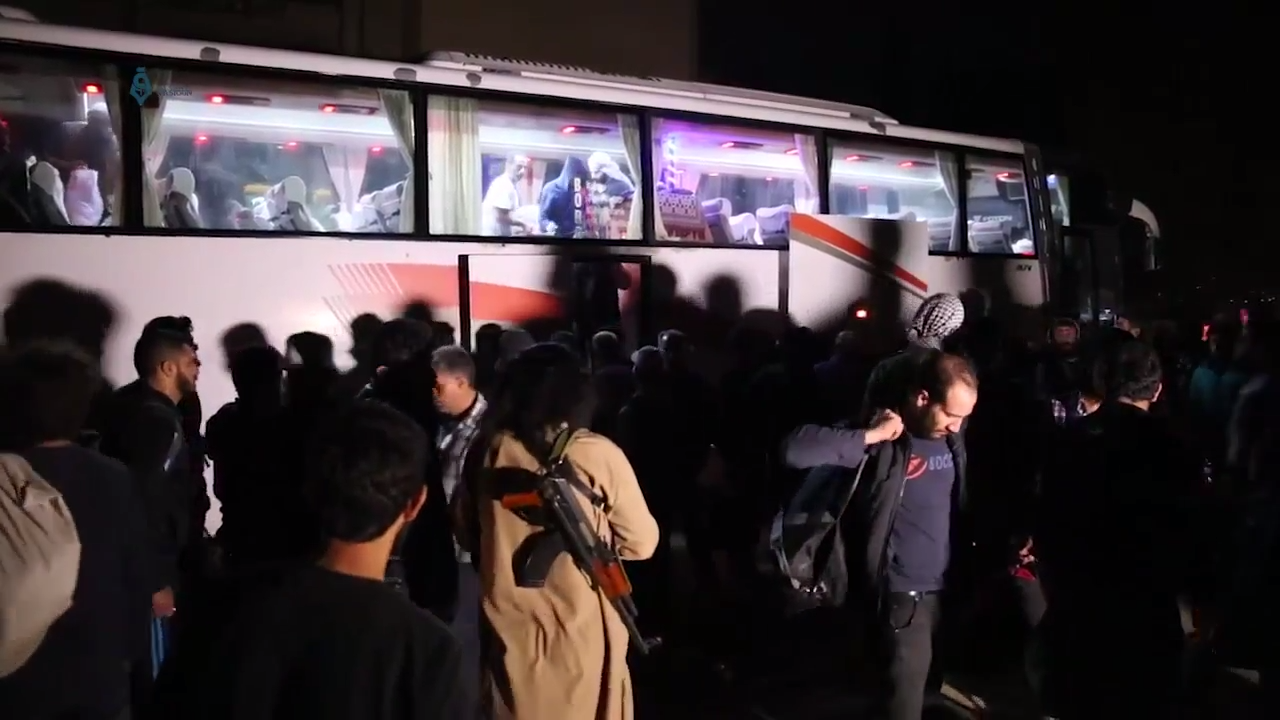
Rebels from Barzeh and Tishrin arrive in Qalaat al-Madiq.

However, on 10 May, some HTS fighters refused to evacuate, calling it "forced displacement" and instead showered Syrian Army positions in Damascus with missiles. In retaliation, the Army launched an assault on areas of Qaboun held by the rebel group, resulting in the capture of 27 buildings near Al-Taqwa mosque. Meanwhile, negotiations continued over Qaboun, while, the Barzeh evacuations were suspended after the government did not release 300 detainees as per the evacuation agreement. Still, on 12 May, after the government promised to release the detainees, preparations were underway for the second batch of rebels to be transferred out of Barzeh that morning. A new agreement was also reached to evacuate rebels and their family members from the Tishreen neighborhood. By the end of the day, about 700 rebels and family members were evacuated from Barzeh, while several buses also evacuated people from Tishreen.

On 13 May, the Army stated it had fully captured Qaboun, while SOHR reported parts of the district were still rebel-held. Later in the day, military operations were again halted as an evacuation deal was announced. The following day, between 1,500 and 2,400 rebels and their family members were transferred out of Qaboun. As the rebels retreated, the Army destroyed a number of large tunnels that had connected Qaboun with other nearby rebel-held areas. One of them was 10 meters deep, while another was "the width of two cars", according to a soldier. Overall, the military discovered more than 10 tunnels during the offensive and expected to locate more. On 15 May, the remaining 1,300 rebels and family members left Qaboun, leaving the area under government control. According to relief agencies, the majority of residents in Qaboun (a total of 3,000–3,500 people) left in May, with those remaining facing a desperate humanitarian situation without access to water or medical support.

On 29 May, the last group of militants and their family members were transported from the Barzeh suburb of east Damascus to the Idlib Governorate, per the agreement put in place between the government and rebels.

== See also ==
- Hama offensive (March-April 2017)
