= Rif Dimashq offensive (June–October 2016) =

Syrian Army offensive

- Part of the Rif Dimashq Governorate campaign (Syrian Civil War)
- Battle map of Damascus as of December 2016
Date	21 June – 30 October 2016 (4 months, 1 week and 2 days)
Location	Eastern Ghouta, Rif Dimashq Governorate, Syria
Result	Syrian government victory: Army and Hezbollah capture Mayda’a Al-Bahariyah, Hawsh Al-Farah, Hawsh Nasri, Tell Sawwan and Tell Kurdi

Belligerents
(Syria) Syrian Arab Republic: Syrian Armed Forces; National Defense Force; Palestine Liberation Army; Hezbollah al-Jabalawi Battalion Guardians of the Dawn	Jaysh al-Islam; Al-Nusra Front; Al-Rahman Legion (Syrian opposition) al-Majd Brigades; Fajr al-Ummah Ahrar al-Sham

Commanders and leaders
Col. Naeem Ahmed † (Republican Guard commander)	Tofiq Khalid al-Khansour † (Jaysh al-Islam senior commander); Abdul Nasr Shmeir (Al-Rahman Legion chief commander); Abu Allam (Al-Rahman Legion commander); Abu Na’im (Al-Rahman Legion commander)

Units involved
Syrian Army: Republican Guard; 102nd Brigade; 105th Brigade; Special Forces; 2nd Legion; Ministry of Interior: Syrian Special Mission Forces	(Syrian opposition) al-Majd Brigades: Abo Mosa Al Ashaari Brigade

Strength
15,000	Unknown

The Rif Dimashq offensive (June–October 2016) is a Syrian Army offensive in the Rif Dimashq Governorate that was launched in late June 2016, as part of the Syrian Civil War. The offensive resulted in the military's capture of parts of the eastern section of the rebel-held eastern Ghouta.

== The offensive ==
=== Government forces capture Mayda’a ===
On 21 June, 102nd Brigade of the Republican Guard, backed by the Palestine Liberation Army and Hezbollah, captured al-Bahariyah Hill, and soon after overran the rebel defenses at al-Bahariyah, capturing the entire village. In addition to capturing al-Bahariyah, the Syrian Armed Forces and Hezbollah also continued their advance at the Jisreen Farms, where they were able to take control of several sites near the Arab Houses.

On the evening of 24 June, the Army and Hezbollah entered Mayda’a, forcing the rebels from the northern part of the town towards the center. One week later, the Army captured the eastern part of Mayda’a. During this time, government troops also advanced in the Al-Bahariyah Farms and towards the Mayda’a-Nashabiyah axis. After reaching Mayda’a's center on 4 July, the following day, after nearly two weeks of fighting, the government captured Mayda’a. With the capture of Mayda’a, the Army cut the rebel's main ammunition supply line for Eastern Ghouta.

On 7 July, a rebel counter-attack recaptured several blocks of Mayda’a, but the following day the military managed to seize back all territory lost, securing Mayda’a once again. The troops then pushed the rebels back a few more kilometers to the west and also secured the farms and road between Mayda’a and Al-Bahariyah. Later that day, the Army pushed into the village of Mid’anah, capturing its eastern and southern parts. On 9 July, the pro-opposition activist group the SOHR confirmed the Army's capture of Mayda’a. Three days later, the military renewed their offensive by making attempts to advance to Hawsh Al-Farah, reportedly capturing several farms east of the village by 12 July.

=== Interlude ===
By 15 July, the government had mostly suspended their offensive in the area. One week later, the Army launched a new assault against Hawsh Al-Farah, resulting in a fierce, several-days-long battle. Government forces, attacking from two directions, first targeted the eastern and southern farms surrounding the town.

Meanwhile, clashes between Jaysh al-Islam and the Al-Rahman Legion took place in Saqba, reminiscent of the inter-rebel conflict a few months earlier. On 23 July, intense airstrikes targeted several rebel-held towns in East Ghouta, while clashes between government forces and rebels occurred along the al-Salam Highway. Furthermore, a prisoner exchange between the government and Jaysh al-Islam took place, with a leading Syrian Army colonel and a female Republican Guard major being freed.

=== Renewed Army advances ===
After capturing the surrounding farmland, the Republican Guard, backed by Hezbollah and NDF units, stormed Hawsh Al-Farah itself on 26 July, leading to heavy house-to-house fighting. After suffering numerous casualties, rebel forces finally retreated into the countryside on 29 July, leaving the strategically important town to the government. The fall of Hawsh Al-Farah served as a major morale boost for pro-government forces in East Ghouta, and allowed them to impose fire control over several important rebel-held cities in the area, such as Mayda’anah, Hawsh Nasri and Hawsh Shalaq.

On 1 August, the Army entered Hawsh Nasri. Five days later, they seized the farms near Hawsh Nasri and on 9 August, took control of all or most of the town. This advance brought the Army into position to attack the hilltop of Tal Kurdi from three different flanks.

On 13 August, the military took control of parts of Hawsh Al-Dawahira and its surrounding farms. At the same time, the Army launched an assault on the strategic Tal Kurdi hill.

On 15 August, Jaysh al-Islam launched a counter-attack to regain Hawsh Nasri, seizing several points and farms in the area of the town. The rebels renewed their counter-assault on 20 August, and captured further positions in Hawsh Nasri, but lost them later in the day. The next day, the Army fully pushed the rebels out of Hawsh Nasri, and attacked the northern flank of Hawsh Dawahrah.

=== Back-and-forth fighting ===
On 22 August, the rebels launched an offensive on the western frontlines of Eastern Ghouta, on a one-kilometer front, in order to lift the pressure off the town of Darayya. However, after several hours of fighting, the rebel offensive was repelled. Following this, the Syrian Army continued its advances in Eastern Ghouta, storming the former signal Army base, near Al-Rayhan, and capturing the storage area of the base. Government forces also reportedly physically cut the rebel supply route between Al-Rayhan and Shifuniyah.

Towards the end of August, the Army captured Al-Rayhan's farms, threatening to encircle Tal Kurdi. Shortly after, government forces captured parts of Al-Rayhan itself, as well as Tal Rayhan hill, placing Tal Kurdi under fire-control. The Army also made advances from Hawsh Al-Farah towards Tal Sawwan, near Tal Kurdi. Over the next three weeks, government troops captured Tal Sawwan twice, but subsequently lost it again both times. As of mid-September, the town was still being contested. Meanwhile, on 5 September, pro-government forces stormed the East Ghouta Signal Base, gaining a bridgehead in its southern corridor.

At sundown on 12 September, a country-wide ceasefire came into effect. In the Damascus area, the ceasefire was temporarily shaken due to fighting in the suburb district of Jobar.

Between 18 and 19 September, a rebel counter-attack between the East Ghouta Signal Base and Al-Reyhan village was repelled. Later on 20 September, government forces captured the Signal Army Base and the surrounding warehouses. In addition, between 19 and 24 September, the military captured a number of farms in the area around Al-Rayhan, cutting the road to Tal Kurdi. On 25 September, the Army seized the Rehba al-Ishara area, including the Katibat al-Ishara military base. Meanwhile, the rebels launched a counter-attack to regain the Signal Base. After the assault was repelled, government forces in turn began their attack on Al-Reyhan village.

After fortifying their positions at Rehba al-Ishara, on 1 October, government forces and Hezbollah units attempted to advance towards Al-Reyhan. As of 3 October, they were within three kilometers of the rebel's largest stronghold in East Ghouta, the town of Douma. On 11 October, the Army captured al-Rayhan and advanced in the Al-Rayhan farms area. Five days later, a rebel-counterattack managed to push government forces back from several positions around the town, with the rebels retaking the western part of Al-Rayhan. On 18 October, the Army launched a renewed push in the west of al-Rayhan in an attempt to cut the supply road for Tal Kurdi, managing to capture the Sbidaj factory area. On 25 October, the al-Majd Brigades seceded from the al-Rahman Legion due to the continued differences between Jaysh al-Islam and the al-Rahman Legion that hindered the rebel attempts to halt the government offensive.

=== Army secures Tal Kurdi ===
On 29 October, the Army captured several factory areas, imposing fire control over Tal Kurdi. On 30 October, after more than 50 days of continues fighting, the Army had taken control of Tal Sawwan and Tal Kurdi and advanced towards Shefonia and Al-Rayhan.

== Aftermath ==
On 8 November, the Army reported it had captured the western farms of Al-Rayhan, encircling the rebels in western part of the town. On 12 November, an advance by the Army on the town was repelled.

A new offensive was launched against Al-Rayhan on 14 November, while on 17 November, an attack was also started against the towns of Al-Dawahra and Midaani. At least 30 civilians were killed in shelling by the Army from 17 to 20 November, on rebel-held towns in the region.

The SAA launched another attack on Midaani on 20 November, capturing nine points inside the town. On the next day, the SAA launched an offensive to reopen the Damascus-Homs highway near Harasta. It also captured seven farms in Midaani. A counterattack by Jaysh al-Islam on Mayda'a was repelled on 23 November. The group claimed that 30 soldiers had been killed in the attack, while SAA claimed it lost only 2.

On 29 November, it was reported the Army and Hezbollah had captured the town of Midaani. However, the following day, government forces were confirmed to be in control of the northern and eastern parts of the town, and attempting to secure the rest of it. On 4 December, the Army once again advanced in the area of Midaani. The Army cut off a rebel supply route between Al-Shifuniyah and Autaya by controlling part of it near Hawsh ad-Dawahirah on 6 December. It also recaptured most of the farms of Hawsh ash-Shalaq village and captured the village itself on the next day. They captured many farms on outskirts of al-Mid’aani and advanced towards Hazrama on 31 December. The Army captured most of the Air Defense Battalion on 1 January 2017 near Hazrama after advancing in the farmlands over the previous days. SAA captured Hazrama on 19 January.

== See also ==
- Rif Dimashq offensive (April–May 2016)
