= East Ghouta inter-rebel conflict (April–May 2016) =

Armed conflict in Syria

- Part of the Rif Dimashq Governorate campaign and the inter-rebel conflict during the Syrian Civil War
Date	18 April – 24 May 2016 (1 month and 6 days)
Location	East Ghouta, Rif Dimashq Governorate, Syria
Result	Ceasefire

Belligerents
Al-Rahman Legion: 1st Brigade; Jaish al-Fustat: Al-Nusra Front; Ahrar al-Sham; Fajr al-Ummah	Jaysh al-Islam: Air Defense Brigade

Commanders and leaders
Wael Alwan (Al-Rahman Legion spokesman)	Qais a-Shami (JaI spokesman)

Casualties and losses
- 500–700 fighters on both sides and 12 civilians killed

The East Ghouta inter-rebel conflict (April–May 2016) was an armed conflict between the rebel coalition of Jaish al-Fustat, consisting of the al-Nusra Front and al-Rahman Legion, and the rebel group Jaysh al-Islam, that occurred in the rebel-held territories east of Damascus. Tensions between the two groups took place since March 2016, when the Rahman Legion expelled Jaysh al-Islam in Zamalka after absorbing the Ajnad al-Sham Islamic Union in February.

== Prelude – Clashes in Jisreen ==
On 18 April 2016, the al-Rahman Legion launched an attack on Jaysh al-Islam headquarters in the town of Jisreen, capturing the headquarters.

== Open conflict ==
=== Fighting starts ===
On 28 April, the Rahman Legion and Jaish al-Fustat attacked Jaysh al-Islam positions in six towns in eastern Ghouta, including Qaboun and Zamalka, resulting in the former's air defence brigade defecting to Jaysh al-Islam. Ahrar ash-Sham denied involvement in the conflict and remained neutral. Due to the fighting, the residents of East Ghouta demonstrated, calling for an end of rebel infighting.

=== Attack on Misraba and ceasefire ===
On 8 May, Jaish al-Fustat, Jabhat al-Nusra, and al-Rahman Legion attacked the Jaysh al-Islam-held village of Misraba. By this time, Jaysh al-Islam mainly controlled the northern areas of East Ghouta, while Jabhat al-Nusra controlled the south. Jaysh al-Islam also raided several pharmacies, and a doctor was killed by stray bullets. By the next day, a ceasefire agreement was signed which mandated Jaysh al-Islam to withdraw from Misraba, which was then to be controlled by a neutral police force. Still, despite the declared ceasefire, fighting continued and by 17 May, more than 500 fighters on both sides and a dozen civilians had been killed in the fighting in East Ghouta. A new ceasefire agreement was declared on 24 May 2016.

== Aftermath ==
In mid-June, a new round of fighting left more than 30 fighters dead on both sides.

On 22 July, during a new government offensive in East Ghouta, the Al-Rahman Legion attacked the Jaysh al-Islam-held "Office of Damascus Countryside" in Saqba, resulting in the deaths of nine rebels.

Between 26 April and 1 May 2017, more than 95 rebels were killed during clashes between Jaysh al-Islam, Tahrir al-Sham, and the Rahman Legion. Jaysh al-Islam fighters opened fire on demonstrators who called for an end to the infighting. The clashes led to Syrian Army advances in eastern Damascus.
