= Beit Sawa =

Beit Sawa بيت سوا Bayt Sawa
- Village
- Location within Syria
- Coordinates: 33°32′16″N 36°23′59″E
- Country: Syria
- Governorate: Rif Dimashq Governorate
- District: Markaz Rif Dimashq
- Nahiya: Kafr Batna

Population (2004)
  - Total: 6,249
- Time zone: UTC+3 (EET)
  - Summer (DST): UTC+2 (EEST)

Beit Sawa (Arabic: بيت سوا; also spelled Bayt Sawa) is a village in southern Syria, administratively part of the Markaz Rif Dimashq District of the Rif Dimashq Governorate, located just east of Damascus. Nearby localities include Hammurah and Saqba to the south, Arbin to the west, Mesraba and Douma to the north. According to the Syria Central Bureau of Statistics (CBS), Beit Sawa had a population of 6,249 in the 2004 census.

== History ==
According to historian Irfan Shahid, who specializes in Byzantine history, it is possible that Beit Sawa was the site of the Damascene monastery of Sawa al-Haykal. "Haykal" refers to a religious building, such as a temple or monastery, where refugees and other struggling people could find safety.

The village was referenced in a verse by Umayyad-era poet Ubayd Allah ibn Qays al-Ruqayyat. Beit Sawa was visited by Syrian geographer Yaqut al-Hamawi in the 1220s, noting that Beit Sawa was "a village of Damascus."

In the late 18th-century, the farmlands of Beit Sawa were part of the principal religious endowment (waqf) of the ashraf families in the northern Syrian city of Hama. The endowment fund belonged to Abd al-Qadir Kaylani, a local scholar and businessman from Hama who died in 1744.

During the current Syrian uprising that began in 2011, Beit Sawa and the nearby Hammurah fields, experienced intermittent shelling by Syrian Army for three days between June 30 to July 2, 2012.

On 7 March 2018, the Syrian army captured Beit Sawa.

== Bibliography ==
- Shahid, Irfan (2002). Byzantium and the Arabs in the Sixth Century. Toponymy, Monuments, Historical Geography and Frontier Studies. Vol. 21. Dumbarton Oaks. ISBN 0884022846.
- le Strange, Guy (1890). Palestine Under the Moslems: A Description of Syria and the Holy Land from A.D. 650 to 1500. Committee of the Palestine Exploration Fund.
