= Ajnad al-Sham Islamic Union =

Alliance of Sunni Islamist groups during the Syrian civil war

Ajnad al-Sham Islamic Union الاتحاد الإسلامي لأجناد الشام
- Official logo of Ajnad al-Sham Islamic Union
- Leaders: Faysal al-Shami †; Abu Muhammad al-Fatah (until November 2015)
- Dates active: 2 December 2013 – 31 May 2018
- Active regions: Rif Dimashq Governorate
- Ideology: Sunni Islamism; Jihadism
- Size: 15,000 (self-claim, 2014)
- Part of: Muslim Brotherhood of Syria; Unified Military Command of Eastern Ghouta (2014–15)
- Wars: Syrian Civil War

The Ajnad al-Sham Islamic Union (Arabic: الاتحاد الإسلامي لأجناد الشام, romanized: al-ittihad al-islami li-ajnad al-sham, "Islamic Union of the Soldiers of the Levant") was an alliance of Sunni Islamist groups affiliated with the Muslim Brotherhood. It was active in the Rif Dimashq Governorate during the Syrian Civil War.

== History ==
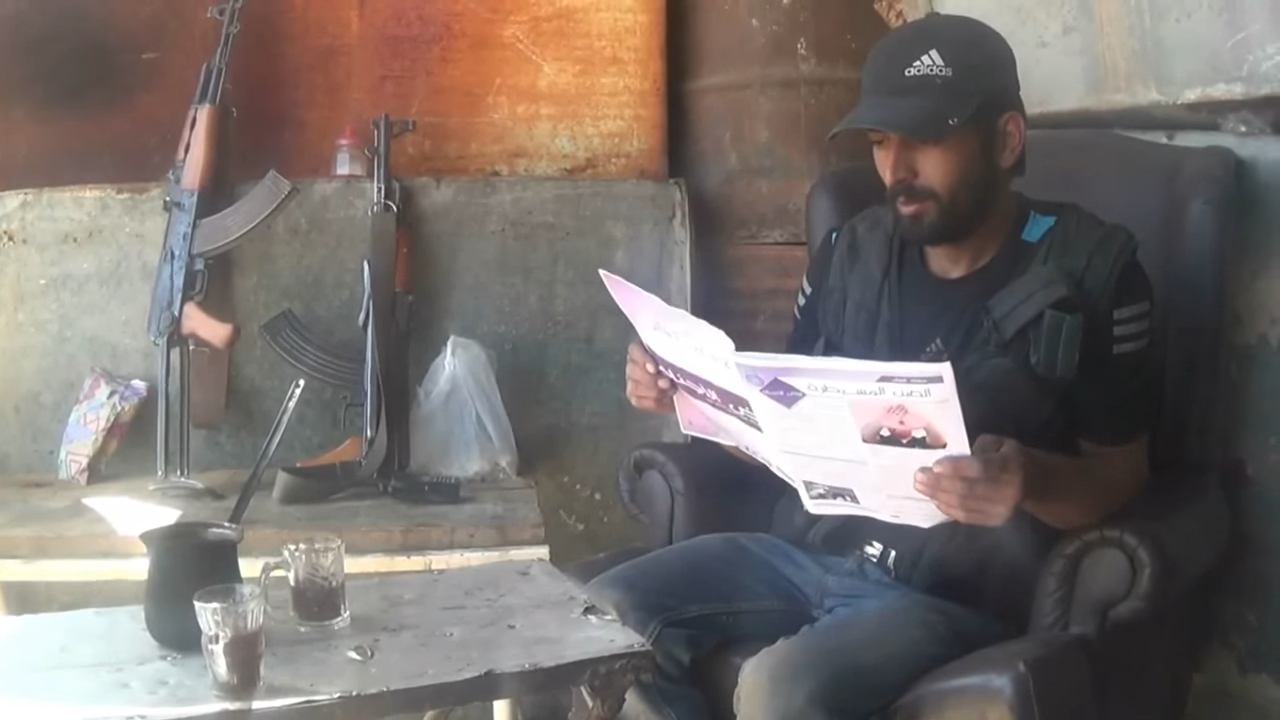
An Ajnad al-Sham Islamic Union fighter during the Siege of Darayya and Muadamiyat, 20 June 2015

In early November 2013, a large number of Sunni Islamist rebel groups in the wider Damascus region announced the formation of the “Greater Damascus Operations Room”, excluding Jaysh al-Islam and the most radical jihadis al-Nusra Front and the Islamic State of Iraq and the Levant. Later that month, five of the larger and most locally well-established groups within the Operations Room—the Habib al-Mustafa Brigades and Battalions, the Amjad al-Islam Gathering, the Sahaba Brigades and Battalions, the Youth of Huda Battalions and the Shield of the Capital Brigade—declared the creation of the Ajnad al-Sham Islamic Union. Abu Muhammad al-Fatah, commander of the Youth of Huda Battalions, was appointed as leader of the formation.

The group was initially allied with Jaysh al-Islam—the largest rebel group in eastern Ghouta—with Islamic Union leader Abu Muhammad al-Fatah being the deputy of Jaysh al-Islam leader Zahran Alloush in the Unified Military Command of Eastern Ghouta. The two groups subsequently came into conflict over control of smuggling tunnels in 2015. Jaysh al-Islam attacked the Islamic Union's headquarters several times between 2015 and early 2016. As a result, Ajnad al-Sham Islamic Union fighters based in eastern Ghouta, including the entire Habib al-Mustafa Brigades and Battalions, announced their "full incorporation" into the al-Rahman Legion, though reiterating that its fighters based in the western Damascus suburbs of Darayya and Muadamiyat as well as in southern Damascus would still operate under the Ajnad al-Sham Islamic Union banner and were not a part of this merger. The Ajnad al-Sham Islamic Union fighters who joined the Rahman Legion were barred from leadership positions and their weapons were seized and redistributed among other Legion members.

On 26 February 2016, Syrian Army Special Forces killed the second leader of the Ajnad al-Sham Islamic Union, Faysal al-Shami ("Abu Malek"), after intense clashes in the Darayya Association Quarter.

On 19 March 2017, Ajnad al-Sham Islamic Union fighters who left Darayya and Muadamiyat between August and October 2016 as part of the evacuation deal to Idlib joined the Sham Legion, reducing the presence of the Ajnad al-Sham Islamic Union to two pockets in the Damascus and Rif Damascus areas.

After the completion of the Beit Jinn offensive in January 2018 and the Southern Damascus offensive the following month, Ajnad al-Sham Islamic Union presence was further reduced to a single pocket in the southern outskirt of Damascus.

In May 2018, the remaining members evacuated to Idlib. Following the evacuation, the groups ceased to be active.

== See also ==
- List of armed groups in the Syrian Civil War
