= Mesraba =

Mesraba مسرابا
- Village
- Location in Syria
- Coordinates: 33°33′2″N 36°24′19″E
- Country: Syria
- Governorate: Rif Dimashq
- District: Douma District
- Subdistrict: Harasta

Population (2004)
  - Total: 5,942
- Time zone: UTC+2 (EET)
  - Summer (DST): UTC+3 (EEST)
- City Qrya Pcode: C2344

Mesraba (Arabic: مسرابا) is a Syrian village located in Douma District, Rif Dimashq. According to the Syria Central Bureau of Statistics (CBS), Mesraba had a population of 5,942 in the 2004 census.
