= Qaboun =

Qaboun ٱلْقَابُون
- Municipality
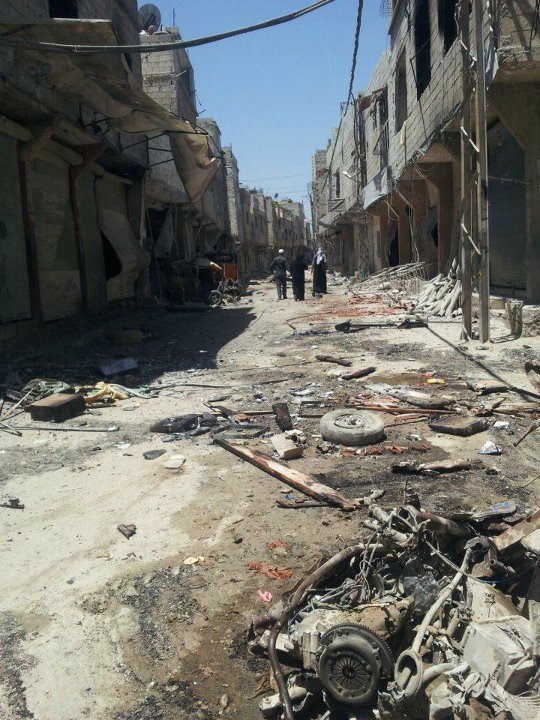
- A street of Qaboun in September 2012

- Coordinates: 33°32′46″N 36°20′16″E
- Country: Syria
- Governorate: Damascus Governorate
- City: Damascus

Population (2017, estimated)
  - Total: 300−2,500
- Time zone: UTC+3 (EET)
  - Summer (DST): UTC+2 (EEST)
- Climate: BSk

Qaboun (Arabic: ٱلْقَابُون, romanized: al-Qābūn, sometimes spelled Al-Kaboun or al-Qaboun) is a municipality and neighbourhood in Damascus, Syria, located 6 kilometers (3.7 mi) north-east of the city center, to the north of Jobar district.

== History ==
Qaboun name is derived from "Abouna" in Syriac language which means "column" or "the place where the water gathers", in reference to Barada river.

In the 2004 census, it had a population of 89,974. In 2017, after the Qaboun offensive (2017), population estimates varied between 300 and 2,500 as a result of mass emigration.

Since the beginning of the Syrian civil war, it was primarily controlled by the rebels, but between 2014 and 2017 was under truce with the government. The situation has been described as a "siege".

On 17 April 2015, the rebels (Jaysh al-Islam and the Free Syrian Army's First Brigade) launched a military campaign to expel the Islamic State in Iraq and the Levant from the Barzeh, Qaboun, and Tishrin neighborhoods, which ended in success 3 days later.

In May 2017, rebels were evacuated as the army regained control. It is estimated that around 2,300 people left at this time.

In March 2022, authorities announced their plans to demolish the neighbourhood.

== See also ==
- Qaboun offensive (2017)
