= Rif Dimashq offensive =

Rif Dimashq offensive may refer to Syrian Civil War offensives:

- Rif Dimashq offensive (August–October 2012) by the Syrian Army
- Rif Dimashq offensive (November 2012–February 2013) by the Free Syrian Army and Al-Nusra Front
- Rif Dimashq offensive (March–August 2013) by the Syrian Army
- Rif Dimashq offensive (September–November 2013) by the Syrian Army
- Rif Dimashq offensive (August–November 2014) by the Syrian Army
- Rif Dimashq offensive (September 2015) or the battle of Allah al-Ghalib, by Jaysh al-Islam and others
- Rif Dimashq offensive (April–May 2016) by the Syrian Army
- Rif Dimashq offensive (June–October 2016) by the Syrian Army
- Rif Dimashq offensive (February–April 2018) by the Syrian Army

== See also ==
- Rif Dimashq clashes (November 2011–March 2012)
