= Rif Dimashq offensive (August–October 2012) =

Syrian army campaign

Rif Dimashq First offensive (August–October 2012) اشتباكات ريف دمشق
- Part of the Syrian Civil War (Rif Dimashq Governorate campaign)
- Frontlines in Rif Dimashq from August to October 2012 Syrian Government control Opposition control Contested For a war map of the current situation in Rif Dimashq, see here.
Date	15 August – 7 October 2012 (1 month, 3 weeks and 1 day)
Location	Rif Dimashq, Syria
Result	Partial Syrian Army victory: Syrian Army seizes more than half a dozen rebel-held towns north, west and south of Damascus; Rebels retain control of the Ghouta area, east of Damascus; Rebels launch their own offensive in mid-November

Belligerents
(Syria) Syrian government	Syrian opposition; (Syrian opposition) Free Syrian Army; Ahrar al-Sham; Al-Nusra Front

Commanders and leaders
Maher al-Assad (WIA)	(Syrian opposition) Unknown

Units involved
Syrian Armed Forces; Syrian Army; Republican Guard; 3rd Armoured Division; 4th Armoured Division; Elements of other divisions; Lijan Militias; Syrian Police; Shabiha	(Syrian opposition) Free Syrian Army; (Syrian opposition) Damascus Military Council; Al-Nusra Front; Foreign fighters

Strength
40,000+ soldiers	(Syrian opposition) Unknown; 750–1,000 fighters

Casualties and losses
Unknown	1,500 fighters killed
- 930 civilians killed (opposition claims)

The Rif Dimashq offensive (August–October 2012) (Arabic: اشتباكات ريف دمشق) was a Syrian Army offensive in the Rif Dimashq Governorate during August–October 2012, as part of the Syrian Civil War.

== Background ==
After the military defeat of the rebels in the Battle of Damascus, sporadic clashes continued in some parts of the capital, where the rebellion was using guerilla tactics and hit-and-run attacks against the security forces. In early August 2012, the Syrian Army largely escalated its anti guerilla operations in order to restore the status quo ante bellum to the governorate.

== Al-Tall ==
The city of Al-Tall was known to be an important rebel base around Damascus. When the Battle of Damascus started, the rebels stormed two government buildings and reportedly detained 40 soldiers while seizing a quantity of weapons. The city was also one of the place where the rebel retreated after their defeat in Damascus. At the end of July, rebels were gathering and massing in Al-Tall to ready themselves for another attack on Damascus. In the beginning of August, the Syrian Army started shelling the rebel positions more intensively. The city became completely besieged by the Army after the abduction of 3 Syrian state-controlled media journalists by the rebels near the city. The Syrian Army took control of the city and cleared it of rebel presence 17 August, while the Syrian National Council described the area a "sinister zone". The three abducted journalists were freed by the Syrian Army. The bodies of 58 executed civilians were reportedly found in the town following the operation.

== Southern Damascus outskirts ==
On 17 August, fighting broke out between the Syrian Army and rebel fighters near the Damascus Military Airport, near Mezzeh district.

On 20 August, activists in Damascus again reported battles between the Army and rebel fighters in the Mezzeh district of Damascus. Helicopters were bombarding the district, leading to at least 12 casualties.

On 22 August, residents and activists reported heavy shelling in the southern Damascus districts of Kfar Souseh, Darayya, Qadam and Nahr Aisha. At least 40 people were killed in the shelling, which was accompanied by attacks from helicopters, and in ensuing ground raids in southern Damascus. The target of the military raids were reportedly rebel mortar teams, which had been targeting the military airport at Mezzeh the previous days. According to one activist, at least 36 of those killed were rebel fighters. Maaz al-Shami, a member of the Damascus Media Office, a group of young opposition activists monitoring the clashes in Damascus, claimed that the rebels who retreated from the capital, after the battle the previous month, had started to return.

On 23 August, and in parallel of the Darayya operation, the Syrian Army launched an important operation in Damascus, in what an opponent described as an "attempt to crush the rebellion once for all" in the capital. Several districts were cut off by the army and several executions of rebels fighters in the city were reported. Dozens of executed bodies were later found on 24 August. The army also arrested several people in the Kfar Sousseh district. State media reported that the Syrian Army discovered and killed the members of a rebel group in the Nair Aisha neighbourhood of the capital. The death toll of the operation was estimated at between 8 and 12 killed.

On 7 September, clashes broke out between rebels and the Syrian Army in Kazaz on the southern outskirts of Damascus, after a rebel attack on Army roadblocks. Also, a bomb went off in the Mezzeh district between the Justice Palace and the Information Ministry

On 12 September, the military started shelling the town of Al-Hajar al-Aswad, on the southern outskirts of Damascus. The town was regarded to be one of the last rebel strongholds on the southern fringes of the capital. The shelling continued until 19 September, when government troops advanced into al-Hajar al-Aswad, as well as the rebel-held al-Qadam and al-A'sali neighborhoods of Damascus, after the rebels retreated from the area during the morning. Army attacks on the south-western suburbs of Muadhamiya, Judaydat Artuz and Kanakir and Qudsaya to the north-west were also reported. During the fighting, the government reported that tens of rebels were killed in the counter-insurgency operation in al-Hajar al-Haswad. Three rebel technicals were also reportedly destroyed in the operation on 15 September.

On 15 September, state media reported that a qualitative operation took place in Al-Sbeineh city. The Syrian Army later found the corpses of 17 rebels who had been killed in the clashes and then burned by their comrades to avoid them being recognized.

On 23 September, the military started shelling the rebel-held town of Al Thiabieh, 11 miles from Damascus. When the rebels from Al Thiabieh and the surrounding area launched a counter-attack the shelling became more fierce. After three days of bombardment, during which two rebel fighters were killed, FSA forces retreated from the town and the military entered on 26 September. According to opposition activists and rebels, the military then started raiding homes, killing 50 people. By the end of the day, the Army withdrew from Al Thiabieh, after completing their operation. An estimated 40 to 107 people were killed during the attack on the town in what was described as a massacre by the opposition.

== Mouadamiya ==
After a two-day operation at the end of July, which killed 120 people in this suburb, the Syrian Army started a new operation on 20 August. The rebels repelled the first attack but the Syrian Army quickly managed to overrun the rebels. The death toll of the operation was estimated at 86 dead, half of them executed by the Syrian Army for being suspected rebels. SOHR confirmed at least 23 of the dead to be rebels. The Syrian media broadcast footage of the large quantity of weapons seized from the rebels in the city.

== Daraya ==
Early during the offensive, rebels attacked a checkpoint outside Darayya, claiming to have killed 30 soldiers.

On 20 August, Daraya was shelled for the first time. Among those killed were 12 rebels.

On 21 August, the Syrian Army began a three-day artillery offensive against the rebels' positions in Darayya, reportedly killing 70 people, including at least 18 rebels. After that, hundreds of soldiers, backed by helicopters and armored vehicles entered Darayya, facing little resistance. The last rebel group withdrew in the face of the military advance and opposition activists were fearing that young men suspected of being rebels could be executed.

On 25 August, the bodies of 200 people were reportedly discovered in the town. Most of the dead appeared to be the result of executions. SOHR reported that the death toll had thus reached 270 killed during the attack on Daraya, including women, children and rebels. One rebel fighter was also killed during the day in security sweeps. 40-50 of the day's corpses had been discovered near a mosque. 80 of the dead had been identified as civilians, while 120 remained unidentified.

On 26 August, the SOHR updated its report on Darayya, saying that 320 people had been killed since the start of the offensive, the majority of them being executed in the previous few days.

The official state agency SANA reported that the army cleansed the city from rebels who had committed crimes against the residents and destroyed public and private properties in the city. However, the UN chief Ban Ki-moon condemned the killings of hundreds in the city and called it "an appalling and brutal crime" while Mohamed Mursi, called for Assad's allies to help push the Syrian leader out of power. "Now is the time to stop this bloodshed and for the Syrian people to regain their full rights, and for this regime that kills its people to disappear from the scene," he told Reuters in his first interview with an international news organisation before embarking on a trip to China and Iran. "There is no room to talk about reform, but the discussion is about change," Mursi said.

Days later, bodies were still being found and local residents claimed the death toll had reached 400.

On 29 August, journalist Robert Fisk, of "The Independent", entered the town and spoke with local residents, some out of earshot of Syrian officials. The residents gave accounts that differed from what was being reported in the media. Some stated that it was the FSA fighters that committed at least some of the killings, the dead being off-duty soldiers or pro-government civilians. They also stated that their homes had been overtaken by rebels and in some cases demolished. Others said they were not sure who was responsible for the killings. The journalist also talked to several officers, who told him that the attack on the town started after talks for a prisoner swap between the rebels and the military failed.

== Eastern Damascus outskirts ==
On 27 August, a rebel commander stated that government forces had been moving, since the start of the offensive, from the west of Damascus, around the capital, to the east towards the Ghouta area. The area had become the next target of the military, following operations in Daraya. He said Ghouta was home to some of the strongest rebel groups. He also claimed that, at the same time, the rebels were attempting to enter Damascus again, this time around in a more organised manner. Earlier during the day, an Army attack helicopter was shot down over the Qaboon district of eastern Damascus, during clashes.

The same day, rebels attacked government positions in Saqba, just northeast of Ghouta, overrunning several Army checkpoints. Following the attacks, opposition activists reported that airstrikes killed 60 people in the adjacent area of Zamalka and an unspecified number in Saqba.

On 29 August, the rebels claimed to have captured a military missile warehouse in the Ghouta area, seizing 10 missiles.

On 7 September, a bomb went off in the eastern Damascus district of Salhayeh, killing several soldiers. Also, clashes occurred in Tadamon between the FSA and government forces, in which at least four soldiers were killed by rebel fighters. The Syrian Army took control of the town of Babila where rebels had been entrenched. The bodies of 45 people were found in the suburbs of Zamalka and Qatana while 16 young men were found dead in Harasta.

On 20 September, hundreds of soldiers sealed the Yarmouk district and conducted searches inside. Five rebels who were found hiding in the district were executed.

On 5 October 2012, rebels advanced in the eastern Damascus suburbs, capturing an air force base and taking caches of missiles. Videos on the internet showed dozens of rebels dressed in army fatigues celebrating with smoke billowing from the base behind them. Meanwhile, rebels in Damascus captured an officer from the elite Republican Guard and provided video footage of the man, who identified himself as Colonel Ahmad Reaidi. Also in the eastern suburbs of Damacus, a military helicopter gunship was reportedly downed by the rebels.

On 24 and 25 October, the Syrian Army fired heavy tank and rocket barrages into the Damascus suburb of Harasta following the rebel capture of two army checkpoints on the edge of that town.

On 26 October, a temporary ceasefire to mark the Muslim holiday of Eid ended within hours. Fighting occurred across the country, with Harasta being shelled with heavy artillery, killing at least 10.

On 30 October, government airstrikes targeted the neighbourhood of Hajar al-Aswad in Damascus city and the suburbs of Yabroud, Hazza and Harasta. At least 11 were killed in a car bombing in central Damascus and 10 were killed in an airstrike on a bus in Hajar al-Aswad. Air strikes leveled areas of Douma, leaving 18 people dead. Fighting took place in Hajar al-Aswad and spilled over into Yarmouk camp, where 112,000 Palestinians with divided loyalties live. Pro-Assad Palestinians clashed with the FSA.

On 31 October, the Free Syrian Army announced that they had helped to form a brigade made up of Anti-Assad Palestinians, (Storm Brigade), who have been armed to take control of Yarmouk camp from the Pro-Assad Palestinian group, Popular Front for the Liberation of Palestine-General Command. The PFLP-GC leader Ahmed Jibril and his men have been accused of harassing the camps residents and attacking FSA fighters. Many Palestinian men from the camp also joined other FSA units and fought with them in the Damascus districts of Tadamon and Al-Hajar Al-Aswad.

On 25 November, rebels seized control of the Marj al-Sultan Military airbase in Eastern Ghouta after a battle in which two Syrian Army helicopters were shot down, leading to the Rif Dimashq offensive (November 2012–present).

== Other operations ==
On 7 October, the military stormed the rebel-held towns of al-Hameh and Qudsaya, just west of Damascus, pushing rebel forces out. Opposition activists reported a "massacre" in al-Hameh, claiming 21-30 people were killed, at least one of them a rebel fighter.

== Overview ==
The increase in the number of operations in Rif Dimashq and Damascus by the Syrian Army and in their intensity is clear. The result is that the ability of rebels fighters to counter the army offensives in their former strongholds in the region seem to have tapered off. This seem to be a result of the new and more violent tactic being adopted by the Syrian Army against rebel former strongholds. One resident of Midan told that everybody was being arrested or killed and that the army was making no difference between residents and identified gunmen contrary to the previous campaigns.

Wissam Tarif from the opposition group Avaaz said that the Army strategy was to provoke intensively the Free Syrian Army into clashes in order to overstretch them, reporting that the operations of the Syrian Army have been intensive, going night and day for ten days. The Syrian Army has also completely locked down the border with Lebanon to prevent reinforcements and weapons to come from the south of Damascus.

The number of reported execution has been described as unprecedented by the opposition activists and several of them see it as a punishment and an intimidation on the population who shelter the rebels near the capital. The activist claimed that the majority of the people killed, overwhelmingly men, are civilians. The death toll from the beginning of August until 24 August has been put at 730 by the same activists. The counter-insurgency operations of the Syrian Army have been more lethal than the Battle of Aleppo, happening at the same moment in the north of Syria.

The rebel group LCCSyria, claimed that 310 people were killed in the Damascus countryside on 25 August, the highest daily death toll in a single place of the civil war reported by this organization.

On 27 August, it was reported by a rebel commander that the rebels tried to shift back the fight toward Damascus to ease up the offensive on the rebels cities.

By early October, opposition activists stated that government troops had managed to push out most rebel forces from the southern outskirts of Damascus following the offensive, mainly due to shortages of ammunition and, in some cases, after running out of local support. It had also been estimated that 1,471 rebels and civilians had been killed in and around Damascus during September while the offensive was ongoing. At the same time, the military reported that their operations around Damascus were almost over.

In mid-November, the rebels appeared to be taking the initiative with the seizure of two military bases around Damascus and attempting to cut the main highway between the capital and Damascus International Airport, leading to a new offensive.
