= Rif Dimashq offensive (November 2012–February 2013) =

Rebel offensive during the Syrian Civil War

- Part of the Syrian Civil War (Rif Dimashq Governorate campaign)
- Frontlines in Rif Dimashq from November 2012 to February 2013 Syrian government control Opposition control Contested For a war map of the current situation in Rif Dimashq, see here.
| Date | 7 November 2012 – 5 February 2013 (2 months, 4 weeks and 1 day) |
| Location | Damascus, Syria |
| Result | Syrian opposition victory: The Free Syrian Army takes control of Darayya, Zamalka, Harasta and Arbin; Rebel offensive stalls in early January 2013, due to continuing air-strikes; Army launches a major offensive on rebel-held Darayya in mid-January; Rebels launch a new offensive in early February 2013 |

Belligerents
| Syrian opposition; (Syrian opposition) Free Syrian Army; Al-Nusra Front; Ahrar al-Sham | (Syria) Syrian government PFLP–GC; Liwa Abu al-Fadhal al-Abbas |

Commanders and leaders
| (Syrian opposition) Khaled al-Haboush (Damascus Military Council commander); Zahran Alloush (WIA) (Liwa al-Islam commander) (Syrian opposition) Bashir al-Ajweh † (Ghouta Martyrs Brigade commander) (Syrian opposition) Anas Mohammed Al-Baghdadi † (Rakan Al Dine Brigade commander) (Syrian opposition) Saari Fashikou † (Member of Damascus Military Council) (Syrian opposition) Maher Al Satlah Abou Omar † (Brigade of Islam Leader) | (Syria) Bashar al-Assad (Syria) Mohammad al-Shaar (WIA) (Minister of the Interior); Issam Zahreddine (Republican Guard Brigade 104 commander); Ahmed Jibril (PFLP – GC) |

Units involved
| (Syrian opposition) Free Syrian Army; (Syrian opposition) Damascus Military Council; Liwa al-Islam; Ghouta Martyrs Brigade; Rakan Al Dine Brigade; Brigade of Islam | Syrian Armed Forces; Syrian Army; Republican Guard; 3rd Armoured Division; 4th Armoured Division; 10th Mechanised Division; 11th Armoured Division; Syrian Air Force; Jihad Jibril Brigades |

Strength
| 4,500 fighters: 750–1,000 al-Nusra fighters | 70,000 soldiers 500 tanks |

Casualties and losses
| 865+ fighters killed | 2,925+ soldiers killed |
- 1,000+ civilians killed

The Rif Dimashq offensive (November 2012–February 2013) refers to a rebel offensive during the Syrian Civil War in the Rif Dimashq Governorate (which surrounds Damascus) which started in November 2012, and a subsequent attempted Syrian Army counterattack in January 2013. Thomson Reuters described rebels as "ramping up attacks on Damascus" in late November and BBC News described the 29 November government counterattack as "an unprecedented offensive against rebel-held districts in the east of the city".

== Background ==
In September 2012 during the Syrian civil war, rebels carried out bomb attacks against military institutions in Damascus, killing 40 to 60 people, including high-ranking government officials, while activists said that the Syrian Army, as well as other pro-Assad gunmen, killed 40 civilians near Damascus and 16 in Damascus itself. In October, rebels attacked governmental sites in Damascus, captured an air force base and shot down a military helicopter in the eastern Damascus suburbs. Clashes continued throughout October, with deaths of rebels, government forces and civilians. Rebels captured two Syrian Army checkpoints in the Damascus suburb of Harasta and on 25 and 26 October, the Syrian Army attacked Harasta with tank shells and rockets.

On 31 October, the Free Syrian Army announced that they had helped to form a brigade made up of anti-Assad Palestinians, (Storm Brigade), which was armed to take control of Yarmouk camp from the pro-Assad Palestinian group, Popular Front for the Liberation of Palestine-General Command. The PFLP-GC leader Ahmed Jibril and his men have been accused of harassing the camp's residents and attacking FSA fighters. Many Palestinian men from the camp also joined other FSA units and fought with them in the Damascus districts of Tadamon and Al-Hajar Al-Aswad.

In the week following the 30 October rebel assassination of high-ranking Syrian Air Force General Abdullah Mahmoud al-Khalidi, rebel fighters engaged in more assassinations of high-profile government figures. On 6 November, rebel gunmen killed Mohammed Osama Laham, the brother of the Syrian Parliament Speaker, as he drove to work.

== The offensive ==
=== November clashes ===
On 7 November, the rebels launched a large operation in Central Damascus. Rebel forces fired mortar shots into the predominantly Alawite Mezzah 86 district near the Presidential Palace and hit the Prime Minister's offices as well as Mezzah's military airport, killing 3 civilians and injuring 12 others. A spokesperson for the Revolutionary Council in Damascus, Susan Ahmed, described the operation as "a countdown", and also stated "It seems something serious is going on there now and things are going out of control. The regime cannot control Damascus anymore". On the same day, a Syrian judge was assassinated in a residential area of Damascus when explosives planted under his car were remotely detonated.

On 12 November, fierce clashes occurred between rebel and government forces in the East Damascus suburb of Ghuta, resulting in the death of 10 soldiers and 1 rebel.

On 17 November, a military helicopter was shot down in the suburbs of Damascus.

Thomson Reuters described rebels as "ramping up attacks on Damascus" in late November. On 19 November, rebels seized the headquarters of an army battalion near the district of Hajar al-Aswad and the southern gate of Damascus, making it the nearest military base to Central Damascus to fall under rebel control. On 25 November, rebels seized control of the Marj al-Sultan military airbase in Eastern Ghouta after a battle in which two Syrian Army helicopters were shot down.

On 28 November, rebel forces started attacking the Damascus International Airport in a strategic attempt to seize important targets; taking control of the airport would weaken the government's air offensive. On 29 November, rebels stated that they had blocked access to the airport. The Ministry of Information said that access to the airport was safe and clear of rebel activity. Emirates and EgyptAir suspended their flights to Damascus. BBC News described the 29 November government fighting as "an unprecedented offensive against rebel-held districts in the east of the city". The main internet gateways to and from Syria were cut off at around 12:00 to 13:00 UTC+02:00 (local time).

=== Early December clashes ===
On 1 December, clashes occurred in Arbin (east of Damascus) and government forces shelled Zabadani, leaving many people wounded, according to the Syrian Observatory for Human Rights (SOHR). Government forces tried to secure the airport highway by fighting in Mliha, as part of a strategy to "secure a wider perimeter around Damascus" to prevent rebels from entering Damascus. Agence France-Presse suggested that the military's aim was to make negotiations with the rebels easier.

Intense fighting between rebels and government forces and bombardment by government forces continued to 2 December in and around the highway to the airport. EgyptAir announced on 2 December that it would reopen flights to the airport on 3 December. On 2 December, the Syrian army bombarded rebel-held suburbs around Damascus with fighter aircraft and rockets, killing at least ten rebels and wounding dozens in an offensive to stop rebels closing in on Damascus. The Syrian army entered part of Daraya where rebels had launched mortars into the city. The Army had entered one side of the town, but rebels were still in control of the rest of the area and were fighting back.

On 3 December, the Syrian Army continued firing artillery and using fighter jets against the rebel-held areas near Damascus in order to protect the capital.

On 4 December, Syrian state television claimed that 29 students and a teacher were killed by a "terrorist" mortar attack in the suburbs of Damascus.

On 5 December, fighting took place near Aqraba military airport (near Damascus International Airport), with the Free Syrian Army claiming to "secure control" of the military airport itself, according to Al Arabiya and NOW Lebanon. According to NOW Lebanon, rebels also took over the Eastern Ghouta airbase for a second time since the first takeover on 25 November.

On 7 December, the rebels claimed that they were still blockading most access to the Damascus International Airport. Damascus Military Council spokesperson Nabil al-Amir stated that the rebels had "waited two weeks for the airport to be emptied of most civilians and airlines" and that as of 7 December, the airport was "a military zone" and that "civilians who approach it now do so at their own risk." Flights by foreign airlines to the airport remained suspended. A governmental spokesperson stated that the Syrian Army was "driving rebels back from positions in the suburbs and outskirts of Damascus". On 8 December, the airport road was blocked at one point.

By 9 December, the military counteroffensive was seen as successful in relieving the rebel pressure on the capital. Patrick Cockburn writing in The Independent stated that the Syrian Army had strengthened its control of Damascus by shifting forces from the Syrian countryside to Damascus. A diplomat contacted by Cockburn stated, "In private, FSA commanders admitted that their attacks in Damascus had not gone as planned and they suffered losses, but this does not mean that they will not try again." Witnesses reported seeing bodies of dead rebels and soldiers lying beside the airport road. A rebel fighter interviewed by The New York Times said that the attack on the airport was a diversion to allow fighters, who were attempting to seize control of the road from Damascus to the northeast, to escape after suffering heavy casualties, due to poor planning. According to him, the resulting Syrian Army counter-offensive resulted in an "unbelievable" level of violence.

On 15 December, a rebel spokesperson for the Ababil Horan and Eastern Ghouta Brigades claimed that the FSA attacked a meeting in Damascus that led to the killing of "a number of the heads of operations" in Damascus and its suburbs, and that they now have knowledge of movements and meetings of other senior heads of operations in Damascus.

=== Battle of Yarmouk Camp ===
On 16 December, Syrian Army jets bombed the Palestinian refugee Yarmouk Camp, for the first time since the uprising began in March 2011. Activists reported at least two rockets fired and dozens killed as a mosque sheltering refugees from embattled areas of the capital was hit.

On 17 December, rebels claimed that many PFLP-GC fighters who were fighting in the camp defected to the rebels, while their leader, Ahmad Jibril, and the remaining fighters joined government troops outside the camp. Later that day, rebel forces gained full control of the Yarmouk camp and another Palestinian camp with assistance from anti-Assad Palestinian factions, pushing PFLP-GC fighters out. Government forces had surrounded the camp, however, as many refugees fled.

On 19 December, fresh fighting on the outskirts of Yarmouk killed a civilian and 4 PFLP-GC members.

On 24 December, rebel fighters ambushed and killed a Military Intelligence Chief in the predominantly Christian and Druze district of Jaramana, southeast of Damascus.

=== Daraya offensive ===
On 31 December, government forces intensified shelling of the rebel stronghold of Daraya. The military amassed a large convoy on the outskirts of the town in preparation to storm the suburb. Rebel fighters said that an armoured column was trying to advance into Daraya, but was being held back by resistance from the Free Syrian Army.

On 2 January, up to 70 people were killed in the Damascus suburb of Mleiha after Syrian Army airstrikes hit a petrol station.

On 4 January, Syrian ground and air forces bombarded rebel strongholds on the outskirts of Damascus, as part of the government's continuing offensive. Rebel forces were fighting the government in areas on three sides of the capital. However, the opposition's advance bogged down due to continuing airstrikes.

On 12 January, a government official and the director of SOHR both confirmed government troops had entered most of Daraya and that there was still heavy fighting in the town.

On 19 January, it was reported that the rebels were still in control of Daraya in spite of fierce clashes and heavy shelling by government forces. Rebels also claimed that a MiG pilot in Daraya had defected and used his fighter jet to bombard three Army positions in the area, killing 15 soldiers of the 4th Syrian Army Brigade; this was not independently confirmed.

On 24 January, the government was shelling Daraya from positions on the Qasioun mountain range west of Damascus.

On 26 January, Asharq al-Awsat reported that rebel forces fighting in Damascus suburbs had fired at the presidential palace in northwest Damascus and toward an army airport, although this wasn't confirmed by other sources.

On 27 January, it was reported that the Free Syrian Army had taken control of a Syrian Army communications base near Damascus International Airport. Rebels also clashed with the Syrian Army at a railway station in the southwestern Damascus district of Qadam.

On 30 January, the Israeli Air Force bombed a convoy in the Jimraya district northwest of Damascus which was alleged to be carrying anti-aircraft weapons bound for Hezbollah, according to American officials and regional security sources. The Syrian government claimed that a research facility was struck, not a convoy, and that two people were killed. Three days later, American officials said that the Syrian Scientific Studies and Research Center, which was damaged in the strike, was the Syrian government's primary research laboratory for chemical and biological weapons.

== Aftermath – Ring road and Jobar offensive ==
On 6 February, rebel forces launched an offensive, named "Battle of Armageddon", on the edge of Central Damascus, with rebels entering the Jobar District of Damascus after overrunning a Syrian Army road block. Parts of the Damascus ring road, which acts as a barrier between Central Damascus and Ghouta, were also seized by rebel fighters. Rebels also launched attacks on Adra, north east of Damascus.

On 10 February, a rebel claimed that opposition forces had captured another military checkpoint in the Jobar district. However, SOHR stated that while fighting for the highway continued, government troops regained control of the area after bombing rebel positions the day before.

On 20 February, a SCUD missile fired by government forces hit the Douma command center of the Liwa al-Islam Brigade, which had been spearheading the attack against the roundabout and the Jobar district. Sheikh Zahran Alloush, the commander and founder of the brigade, had been wounded in the strike. The area was devastated and other rebel fighters were also killed or wounded.

On 27 February, SOHR claimed that rebels had fired several mortar shells which exploded in the military judiciary and literature department of the University of Damascus.

== Strategic analysis ==
Holding Damascus was considered crucial for the government, which kept its highest concentration of troops and its most loyal and best-trained units in and around the city. According to The New York Times, rebels were unlikely to be able to overrun Damascus quickly, but the fighting in Rif Dimashq, especially at the airport, had a profound psychological effect on government supporters, making them feel trapped, and forcing the Syrian Army to shift resources from other areas to defend Damascus.

Damascus residents described an atmosphere of tension and fear. Government checkpoints were also so numerous that it was difficult to travel anywhere without passing through one. Emile Hokayem of the International Institute for Strategic Studies described the fighting as "part of the strategy of encirclement of the city. The rebels are making a very strong point: that they can go after anything that is seen as critical infrastructure." He expected that the government would be able to reopen the airport and the airport road, but that "the cost of doing so [would] increase over time."

Daraya bore the brunt of the Army's offensive due to its proximity to the Presidential complex, which the rebels' rockets missed.

In early January 2013, reports emerged that the military had prior knowledge of the rebel offensive. Based on the information, the Army withdrew on purpose from less strategically significant positions in favor of massing troops to defend Damascus and thus luring rebel forces farther from their supply bases. Due to the Army's retreat and false information leaked to the media on the state of the military, the rebels attacked even before their official start date for the offensive. Once the rebels advanced beyond their supply chains and started attacking the outskirts of the capital, the military used concentrated artillery and air attacks to hit them and inflict the greatest number of casualties. One of the rebel groups reportedly suffering heavily was the Al-Nusra Front.
