= Damascus offensive (2013) =

Part of the Syrian Civil War

- Part of the Syrian civil war (Rif Dimashq Governorate campaign)
- Frontlines in Rif Dimashq from February to March 2013 Syrian government control Opposition control Contested
Date	6 February – 25 March 2013 (1 month, 2 weeks and 5 days)
Location	Damascus, Syria
Result	Partial rebel victory: Rebels capture parts of the ring road on the edge of Damascus and the city's Jobar district in early February; Rebels capture the Qaboun and Kafar Souseh districts in late March; Government forces launch a counter-offensive to the east of Damascus in late March

Belligerents
Syrian opposition; Free Syrian Army; Syrian Islamic Front; Al-Nusra Front	(Syria) Syrian government Hezbollah; PFLP–GC; Liwa Abu al-Fadhal al-Abbas

Commanders and leaders
Abu Mohammad al-Julani (Al-Nusra Front commander) (Syrian opposition) Khaled al-Haboush (Damascus Military Council commander); Zahran Alloush (Liwa al-Islam commander)	Bashar al-Assad; Issam Zahreddine (Republican Guard Brigade 104 commander); Ali Abdullah Ayyoub (Chief of staff); Ahmed Jibril (PFLP-GC commander); Ali Smender † (National Defence Front for Syria)

Units involved
(Syrian opposition) Free Syrian Army; (Syrian opposition) Damascus Military Council; Liwa al-Islam; Ahrar al-Sham; Battalions of Hamza ibn Abdul-Muttalib	Syrian Armed Forces; Syrian Arab Army; Republican Guard; 1st Armoured Division; 3rd Armoured Division; 4th Armoured Division; 10th Mechanised Division; 14th Special Forces Division; National Defence Forces; Syrian Air Force; Jihad Jibril Brigades

Strength
4,500 fighters; 750–1,000 al-Nusra fighters	70,000 soldiers, 1000+ tanks

Casualties and losses
735+ fighters killed	3,400+ soldiers killed

The Damascus offensive refers to a series of rebel operations that began in early February 2013 in and around the city of Damascus.

== Timeline ==
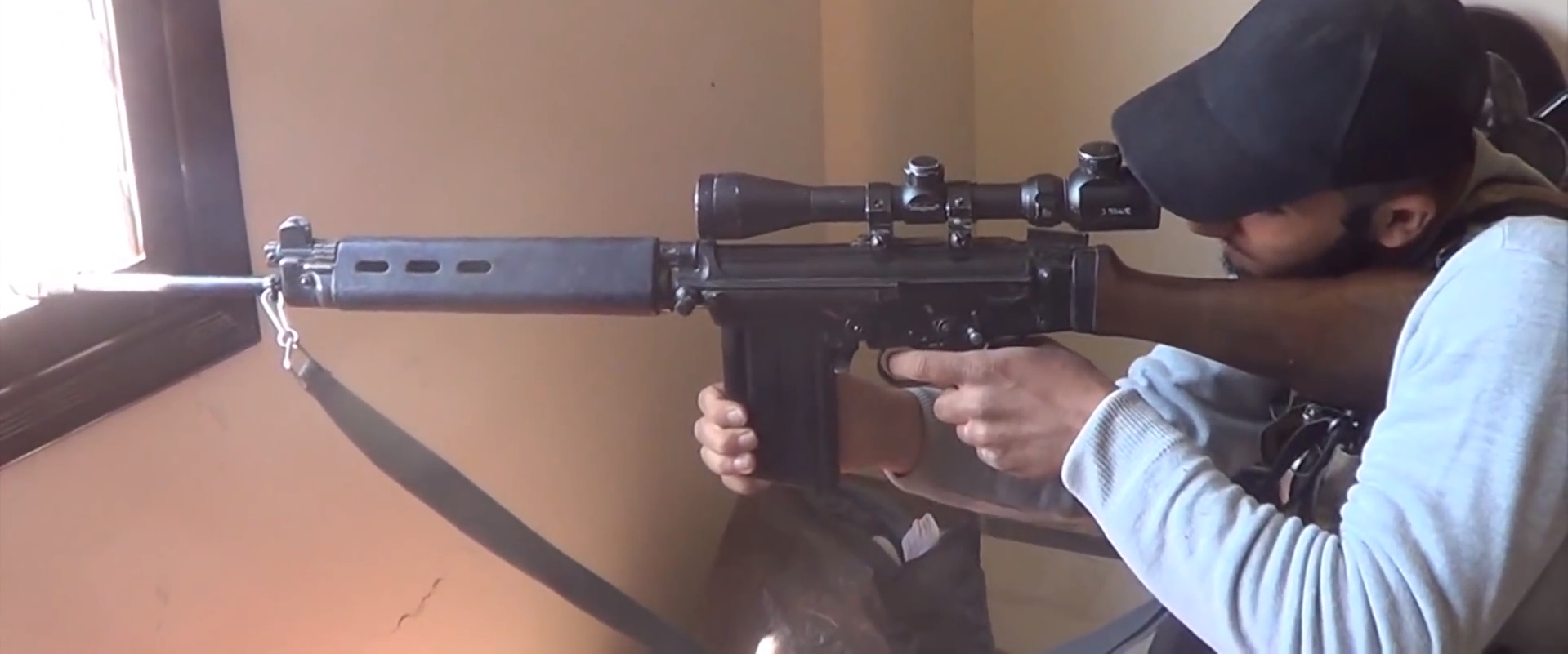
Sniper of the rebel al-Siddiq Battalions during the offensive

On 6 February, rebel forces launched an offensive, named "Battle of Armageddon", on the edge of Central Damascus, with rebels entering the Jobar District of Damascus after overrunning a Syrian Arab Army roadblock. Parts of the Damascus ring road which acts as a barrier between Central Damascus and Ghouta were also seized by rebel fighters. Rebels have also launched attacks on Adra, north east of Damascus.

On 10 February, a rebel claimed that opposition forces had captured another military checkpoint in the Jobar district. However, Syrian Observatory for Human Rights stated that while fighting for the highway continued, government troops regained control of the area after bombing rebel positions the day before.

On 19 February, the rebels began moving truckloads of anti aircraft weapons into Jobar in an effort to consolidate advances made in the Eastern Damascus district.

On 20 February, a SCUD missile, fired by government forces, hit the command center of the Islamist militia Liwa Al-Islam near Douma, which had been spearheading the attack against the roundabout and the Jobar district. Sheikh Zahran Alloush, the commander and founder of the brigade, had been wounded in the strike. The area was devastated and other rebel fighters were also killed or wounded.

On 21 February, rebels launched 3 car bombings on security targets in the Barzeh neighbourhood in Damascus. Also fired several mortar rounds at the Syrian army's general staff headquarters in Umayyad Square, as well as other streets and squares known to house government and security offices, according to residents and activists. SOHR claimed that 22 people, mostly soldiers, were killed in these other attacks.

On 27 February, SOHR claimed that rebels had fired several mortar shells which exploded in the military Judiciary and literature department of the University of Damascus.

On 2 March, heavy fighting was reported in Darayya between rebels and the Syrian Army. The Local Coordination Committees of Syria claimed that rebels targeted a military column attempting to storm Darayya, and also defended several attempts by the government to storm Jobar.

On 3 March, rebels reportedly fired several rockets at security forces headquarters in Damascus, though it is unknown if there were any casualties.

On 12 March 30 military deserters were killed in an Army ambush near Damascus while they were heading towards the rebel-held Eastern Ghouta area.

Situation in Damascus, mid-March 2013

On 18 March, rebels operating within Damascus launched mortar bombs at the Damascus Presidential Palace, though its unclear if there were any casualties.

On 21 March, an explosion in the Iman Mosque in the Al-Mazraa district killed as many as 41 people, including Sunni cleric, Sheikh Muhammad Said Ramadan al-Bouti. Syrian state TV claimed the explosion was a suicide bombing, though some residents claim it was caused by a mortar bomb that struck a nearby political office.

On 25 March, the rebels launched one of their heaviest bombardments of Central Damascus since the start of their revolt, with mortars reportedly hitting Umayyad Square, where the Ba'ath Party headquarters, Air Force Intelligence and state television are also located. The attack was launched when rebel forces advanced into the Kafr Souseh district of Damascus, and the Syrian Army retaliated with artillery launched from Mount Qasioun.
