= Battle of Douma =

Battle

Coordinates: 33.5833°N 36.4000°E

- Part of the Rif Dimashq clashes (November 2011–March 2012) of the Early insurgency phase of the Syrian civil war
Date	21 – 30 January 2012 (1 week and 2 days)
Location	Douma, Rif Dimashq, Syria
Result	Syrian Army victory: Syrian Army retakes the city.; FSA retreats from the city.

Belligerents
Free Syrian Army; Other rebel militias	(Syria) Syrian Arab Republic: Syrian Arab Army

Units involved
Unknown	3rd Armoured Division: 80th Armoured Brigade; 82nd Armoured Brigade

Strength
300 FSA soldiers	1,000+ soldiers

Casualties and losses
158+ killed	37+ killed

The Battle of Douma was a military engagement during the Syrian civil war. The battle began on 21 January 2012, after Free Syrian Army fighters changed their tactics from attack and retreat guerrilla warfare in the suburbs of Damascus to all-out assault on army units. Earlier in January, the FSA had taken the town of Zabadani, and consequently gained control over large portions of Douma. After a general offensive in the suburbs, Douma was retaken by the Syrian army at the same time as the other rebelling suburbs.

In the fall of 2012, the FSA mounted an offensive and took back Douma by late October.

== Battle ==
=== Opposition controls Douma ===
According to activists in touch with Reuters, the Free Syrian Army erected barriers of sandbags in the streets of Douma and took effective control of the city on 21 January. According to activists on the ground and the Britain-based Syrian Observatory for Human Rights (SOHR), by the end of the day the whole city had fallen under the control of the rebel army and was effectively cut off from the rest of the world. However, the Local Coordination Committees dismissed claims of the FSA having firm control of the city as there were reports by activists that security forces withdrew but may return.

The next day, the Syrian Revolution General Commission (SRGC) told Al Jazeera that Syrian army troops re-entered several areas of the suburb and shelled some of them. The SRGC said that limited clashes took place between government troops and FSA fighters, and that explosions could be heard on Mesraba Bridge and Aleppo Street. The group also reported that troops used heavy machine guns to fire on homes in several areas of Douma, including Jisr Mesraba, and al-Hal market. At least one person was killed during the violence. The clashes that broke out outside Douma between security forces and defectors appeared to be a bid by government troops to recapture the town, according to the Syrian Observatory For Human Rights. A video reportedly by the FSA said that if the Syrian army stormed Douma they would fire rockets at the presidential palace and execute 5 senior officers they captured.

That same day in the afternoon, a video showed FSA fighters patrolling the streets while activists inside the city reported that fighting had moved to the outskirts, where the army was preparing to recapture the city by using tanks. By the end of the day, an opposition activist and a rebel fighter in Douma told Reuters by telephone the fighting had eased and the rebels held about two-thirds of the city's main streets. They reported that fighters had set up checkpoints and a funeral procession for five civilians killed by security forces during the fighting was passing through the town. The funeral procession attracted over 150,000 protesters, according to activists.

=== Government counteroffensive ===
On 25 January BBC reporter, Jeremy Bowen, filed an audio-report from Douma, reporting that the centre of Douma was in the hands of the opposition. In his report, Bowen spoke to protesters and to armed opposition forces manning checkpoints. The next day, the Syrian army stormed Douma, entering the city from all sides, conducting house to house raids to arrest opponents according to activists, who added that the army was meeting no resistance. However, reports varied about the opposition faced government forces in Douma and also other towns in the Damascus suburbs of Arbin, Zamalka, Jisreen, and Harasta.

According to some reports, government soldiers met heavy resistance from the armed opposition, and Hussein Makhlouf, the governor of rural Damascus, was quoted by Reuters as saying that the government was planning on discussing a ceasefire with the opposition controlled suburbs as was done in Zabadani. At the police hospital in Harasta, the staff said that most of the Damascus suburbs were out of government control and that opposition fighters were targeting individuals related to the government. They also claimed that snipers had made their nest in some of the minarets. Some veiled women in government controlled parts of Harasta also claimed that the opposition fighters in the suburb did not belong to Free Syrian Army, however, given the fighting conditions it was impossible to verify either the opposition or government claims.

=== Government reasserts control ===
On 29 January, an estimated 2,000 government troops backed by tanks attempted to retake the rebellious Damascus suburbs. At least 19 people were reported killed, including fourteen civilians and five rebels during the government crackdown on the Damascus suburbs, in what locals described as "urban warfare." On the next day, the cities of Douma, Harasta and Saqba were under siege, with government checkpoints blocking all roads into the suburbs and soldiers manning checkpoints every 300 meters in these cities. A resident of Damascus claimed that region was partly out of government control. On 2 February, it was confirmed that the Syrian Army had retaken Douma a few days earlier and that the FSA had fled. Hundreds of troops were controlling the mostly deserted streets and had, according to activists, arrested hundreds of people in Douma. In the evening, a crowd assembled outside a mosque for a funeral and vowed to continue their protest. Complete and decisive victory was achieved on 30 June when Syrian army troops entered all parts of Douma.

== Aftermath ==
On 15 October, 6 rebels were killed, mostly in the bombardment of the rebel suburb of Harasta. 24 civilians were killed in artillery bombardments by the military, 11 of them in the suburb of Douma. Clashes were reported in Zamalka, with 3 soldiers being killed. Widespread clashes were reported the next day, on 16 October, with the towns Hamurya and al-Ghuta al-Sharqiya outside Damascus being in rebel hands with clashes in other suburbs. 12 rebels and 4 soldiers were reported killed as well as 16 civilians who mostly died at military checkpoints or through artillery bombardment.

On 17 October, clashes and shelling were reported in Douma, which had been seized by the army in June, with 3 rebels and 6 soldiers being killed in the new clashes. According to activists in the al-Ghouta area, 6 civilians, including children, were shot and killed by the military. A local Government official was assassinated in Damascus city.

On 18 October, a New York Times reporter visited Douma and reported that it was under rebel control once more.

On 25 October, the Syrian Army fired heavy tank and rocket barrages into the Damascus suburb of Harasta following the rebel capture of two army checkpoints on the edge of that town.

On 26 October, a temporary ceasefire to mark the Muslim holiday of Eid ended within hours. Fighting occurred across the country with Harasta being shelled with heavy artillery, killing at least 10.

On 27 October, it was reported that 8 were killed by an airstrike on the rebel-controlled suburb of Irbeen. Airstrikes also targeted other suburbs of Damascus such as Zamalka and Harasta, meanwhile rebels took control of three army outposts on the outskirts of Douma, killing 4 soldiers.
