= Qalamoun Shield Forces =

Syrian militia

- قوات درع القلمون (Quwat Dir' al-Qalamoun)
- Logo of the militia since 2016. It includes a Quran quote: "If God supports you, no one can overcome you."
- Leaders: Adel Ibrahim Dellah (c. 2015–16); Firas Jaz'ah (c. 2016–18)
- Dates active: January 2014 – May 2016 (unified); May 2016 – Fall 2018 (after split)
- Groups: Qalamoun Shield 215 (al-Hamah contingent); al-Jabba contingent; al-Tall contingent
- Headquarters: Various towns in the Qalamoun Mountains, most importantly al-Nabek and Yabroud
- Active regions: Syria
- Part of: Syrian Army's 3rd Armoured Division (as auxiliary force)
- Wars: the Syrian Civil War

The Qalamoun Shield Forces (Arabic: قوات درع القلمون, romanized: Quwwāt Dirʿ l-Qalamūn, short: QSF) (Note: The militia is also known as Qalamoun Shield (Dara'al-Qalamoun).) was a militia based in the Qalamoun Mountains that fought for the Ba'athist Syrian government during the Syrian Civil War prior to the government's collapse. Originally a small auxiliary and self-defense group, QSF grew into relatively large and well-equipped paramilitary force that operated nationwide. Led by Firas Jaz'ah, the Qalamoun Shield Forces were closely affiliated with the 3rd Armoured Division.

== History ==
=== Early history as Republican Guard auxiliaries ===
The origins of the Qalamoun Shield Forces lie in a small militia of the same name that was set up in al-Nabek after its capture from rebels during the Battle of Qalamoun (2013). Formed by "notables, retired officers and other locals" on 9 January 2014, this unit was designated as auxiliaries to the Republican Guard and was supposed to secure areas retaken from rebel groups. A Damascus native named Adel Ibrahim Dellah eventually became commander of the group. In course of 2015, the nascent QSF had significantly grown in numbers (claiming hundreds of members) and expanded its operations: Fighting at the side of the Republican Guard, the militia not only took part in further offensive operations in the western Qalamoun mountains, but also fought in the wider Rif Dimashq Governorate such as at Harasta, where they played a prominent role in retaking territory from insurgent groups. Later into the year, the Qalamoun Shield Forces even sent fighters to take part in the Battle of Aleppo and the Homs offensive (November–December 2015) against ISIL. During these operations, the group began to closely cooperate with the 3rd Armoured Division, leading to the Qalamoun Shield Forces' loyalties shifting away from the Republican Guard. The Qalamoun Shield Forces also dispatched some troops to fight alongside the Republican Guard in the Siege of Deir ez-Zor (2014–17). These forces were eventually fully incorporated into the Republican Guard's 104th Brigade.

In the first half of 2016, the militia became especially active in the Syrian steppe and Syrian Desert, fighting in the Palmyra offensive (March 2016), the Battle of al-Qaryatayn (March–April 2016) and the Al-Dumayr offensive (April 2016). Around this time, Syrian Army lieutenant colonel Firas Jaz'ah became the "general supervisor" of the militia, though Adel Ibrahim Dellah continued to serve as military commander of QSF.

=== Split and service with the 3rd Division ===
In May 2016, QSF finally split due to the group's divided loyalties: One faction under the militia's old commander Adel Ibrahim Dellah cut all ties with the 3rd Division and formed a new group, the "'Homeland Protection Forces". The other faction, led by Firas Jaz'ah, remained with the 3rd Division and continued to function under the name "Qalamoun Shield Forces". This group significantly expanded its recruitment efforts in the wider Qalamoun area, and also began to enlist hundreds of former Free Syrian Army (FSA) rebels into its ranks as part of reconciliation agreements. Already by early 2017, some estimated that about 50% or more of QSF consisted of ex-insurgents; others however claimed that the numbers were closer to around 10%.

Thus strengthened despite the Homeland Protection Forces' break-off, the Qalamoun Shield Forces further expanded their operations throughout Syria. In the Syrian Desert, QSF helped to defend the Tiyas Military Airbase from ISIL during the Palmyra offensive (December 2016), and then took part in numerous government (counter-)offensives which aimed at reclaiming all of central Syria from the ISIL and various FSA groups: The Eastern Homs offensive (2017), East Hama offensive (2017), the Syrian Desert campaign (May–July 2017) and the Central Syria campaign (2017). The Qalamoun Shield Forces also helped to stall and/or defeat major rebel offensives in northern Hama Governorate in 2016 and mid-2017, and took part in government operations against rebel and ISIL forces in the Hama-Idlib-Aleppo Governorates border region in late 2017.

Meanwhile, QSF continued to be active in its core regions in southwestern Syria, where it aided the government conquest of the Barada river valley in early 2017, and closely cooperated with Hezbollah to destroy the last holdouts of Tahrir al-Sham, the Syrian opposition, and ISIL at the Lebanon–Syria border. In course of these operations in the Qalamoun Mountains, QSF recruited more ex-rebels into its ranks, allegedly promising some of them that they would only have to serve in their own home areas. Despite this, pro-rebel media claimed that QSF later forced several of these ex-rebels (from al-Tall) to fight against ISIL in the eastern desert. On 30 December 2017, QSF also sent one of its battalions to take part in the Battle of Harasta. In course of this battle, one Qalamoun Shield contingent which consisted of ex-rebels reportedly defected back to local insurgents, resulting in a temporary crisis for the government troops. As result of this event, QSF commander Firas Jaz'ah was dismissed by the 3rd Division.

=== Dissolution ===
From 2018, the Syrian government increasingly attempted to demobilize loyalist militias, fully integrate them into the regular armed forces, or reduce their quasi-autonomous powers in other ways. The Qalamoun Shield Forces were among the units affected by this development. In August 2018, the Political Security Directorate reportedly removed the militia's armed presence from al-Tall, suspended its local commander Nasir Shamu, and sent its fighters to Deir ez-Zor, where they would fight ISIL. QSF garrisons in other villages of the Qalamoun Mountains were allegedly sent to al-Qutayfah, where they were integrated into the 3rd Division. By fall 2018, the Syrian government fully dissolved the group, along with the Ba'ath Brigades and other pro-government paramilitary formations. The majority of its members entered into service with the regular 3rd Armoured Division. Despite this, the QSF maintained at least some cohesion as separate unit within the 3rd Division.

== Organization, support and funding ==
The Qalamoun Shield Forces were led by Firas Jaz'ah, a lieutenant colonel who is closely affiliated with the 3rd Division, and were organized into several sub-units according to their places of origin. Accordingly, the group maintains numerous bases in the region, most notably at al-Nabek and Yabroud. Though most of the militia's fighters were from the wider Qalamoun region, they were known to also have members from Damascus and the Golan Heights. In their core areas, QSF sometimes acts as police force, and also maintains posts along the border with Lebanon, most notably at Flitah.

Though QSF was most closely connected to the 3rd Division, it never completely separated from the Republican Guard and also maintains links with the Air Force Intelligence and the Military Intelligence Directorates, as well as the Lebanese Hezbollah. The Military Intelligence Directorate and businessman George Haswani provided funding to the group. The Russian International Affairs Council claimed in 2017 that QSF had joined the Syrian Army's Fifth Corps. Other sources did not mention this, and it remains unclear whether the militia was actually part of the Fifth Corps at any point.

The Qalamoun Shield Forces were relatively well equipped, using technicals, 9M113 Konkurs anti-tank missile, and Syrian "Bourkan" (Vulcano) rockets. In early 2017, all fighters of QSF were trained and equipped by the Russian Armed Forces. In regard to its combat capabilities, the QSF has been characterized by pro-government media both as auxiliary force for the regular army and as rapid reaction force.

== See also ==
- List of armed groups in the Syrian Civil War
- Russian involvement in the Syrian Civil War
