= Battle of Jdaidet al-Fadl =

Battle during the Syrian civil war

- Part of the Syrian civil war and the Rif Dimashq offensive
Date	16–21 April 2013 (5 days)
Location	Rif Dimashq, Syria
Result	Syrian government victory
Territorial changes	Syrian government forces regain control of Jdaidet al-Fadl

Belligerents
Syrian Opposition; Mujahideen	(Syria) Syrian Government

Commanders and leaders
Muhammed Jameel Noufel †	Unknown

Units involved
(Syrian opposition) Free Syrian Army; (Syrian opposition) Falcons of Damascus; Mujahideen	Syrian Armed Forces; Syrian Army; Republican Guard; 555th SF (Airborne) Regiment; 100th Artillery Regiment; National Defense Forces

Strength
(Syrian opposition) 270–300 militants	3,000 troops

Casualties and losses
(Syrian opposition) 150–190 militants killed (Syrian opposition) Many militants arrested	Unknown
- 100–300 civilians killed

The Battle of Jdaidet al-Fadl took place during the Syrian civil war, during which the Syrian Army took control of Jdaidet al-Fadl and Artouz and was accused by opposition sources of conducting a massacre of up to 500 people (including fighters). The Syrian Army, for its part, accused rebels of killing supporters of the government.

== Battle ==
On 16 April, the Syrian Army moved to take control of the towns of Jdeidat Artouz and Jdaidet al Fadl in the Damascus countryside.

On 20 April, the Syrian army was pressing to take full control of the town of Jdaidet al-Fadl, southwest of Damascus, where rebels entered the town four days prior. 69 people were killed in the four-day battle, most of them rebels. The fighting also affected the nearby town of Jdeidit Artouz, which is predominantly Christian.

On 21 April, the Syrian Army captured Jdaidet al-Fadl, with the opposition making claims of a massacre being committed. SOHR stated 250 people were killed since the start of the battle for Jdaidet al-Fadl, five days prior, with them being able to document, by name, 127 of the dead, including 27 rebels. Another opposition claim put the death toll at 450. One activist claimed he counted 98 bodies in the town's streets and 86 in makeshift clinics who were summarily executed. Another activist stated they documented 85 people who were executed, including 28 who were killed in a makeshift hospital. The opposition activist group LCC reported 483 people were killed in the battle for the town, around 300 of them civilians and 150 rebels. 3,000 government troops participated in the fighting.

The official state news agency, SANA, also reported the Syrian Army victory in the town, adding that they inflicted heavy losses on the rebels. Syrian state TV showed footage of the town with soldiers patrolling the streets and with corpses of rebels lying on the ground.

Jamal al-Golani, a member of the Revolution Leadership Council opposition group, said that there were 270 rebels in the town, and that the rebels had no chance to repel the army assault. Opposition activists said that shops were torched or looted. He added that hundreds of shells were fired during the battle and that 400 injured people were in the makeshift hospitals.

Military sources contradicted activist's accounts of the battle, saying that the district was known for its support of the government and that the army responded to calls from residents after 20 soldiers and 50 residents were captured by rebels in the town. Rebels had deployed a large number of snipers in the town. Two officers and many soldiers were killed by them on the first day. After neutralizing the snipers with the help of locals, the Army entered the four districts of the town and heavy clashes erupted, with 80 rebels killed the first day. In the next two days, the Army took over of the last part of the town, where most rebels had pulled back, killing another 110 rebels in the two days of fighting, including their leader Muhammed Jameel Noufel. Tanks and artillery were used during the last day to flush out the remnants of the rebels. The military sources added that they found a mass grave in Jdaidet al-Fadl, and said that rebels used it to bury their dead and government soldiers and civilian supporters they had killed.

Opposition activists gave their description of the battle: they said that the Army entered and pulled out of the neighborhood for the first three days of the battle, and that 100 to 200 people were killed and buried during that period. Shamel al-Golani, from the opposition Sham Network, said that many of the killed were from Daraya and Modamiyah, where the fighting has been ongoing for months. After the first three days, the rebels withdrew, leaving the town under the control of the Syrian Army. Activist Sawasieh stated that Al Fadl was targeted because it was an incubator of armed rebels against the government.

On 22 April, the Army had completed its operation in the city and pulled out most of its troops, leaving patrols and snipers in the town.
