= Rif Dimashq offensive (September–November 2013) =

Military offensive

- Part of the Syrian Civil War (Rif Dimashq Governorate campaign)
- Frontlines in Rif Dimashq in late February 2014 Syrian Government control Opposition control Contested For a war map of the current situation in Rif Dimashq, see here.
Date	10 September – 28 November 2013 (2 months, 2 weeks and 4 days)
Location	Rif Dimashq, Syria
Result	Syrian government victory: Government forces capture seven towns south and southeast of Damascus; Rebels launch an offensive in an attempt to break the siege of Eastern Ghouta; Government forces launch an assault on al-Malihah and Jobar four months later

Belligerents
Syrian opposition; Al-Nusra Front; Free Syrian Army; Damascus Military Council; Islamic Front (from 22 November); Jaysh al-Islam; Ahrar al-Sham	(Syria) Syrian Arab Republic: Syrian Armed Forces; Hezbollah; Liwa Abu al-Fadhal al-Abbas; LAAG; Arab Nationalist Guard

Commanders and leaders
Abu Mohammad al-Julani (Al-Nusra Front commander); Khaled al-Haboush (Damascus Military Council commander)	Bashar al-Assad (President of Syria); Issam Zahreddine (Republican Guard Brigade 104 commander); Wisam Sharafedine † (Hezbollah commander)

Units involved
Unknown	Syrian Arab Armed Forces (Ba'athist Syria); Syrian Army; 3rd Armoured Division; 4th Armoured Division; 10th Mechanised Division; 11th Armoured Division; Republican Guard; National Defense Force

Strength
4,500 fighters: 750–1,000 al-Nusra fighters	70,000 soldiers, 500 tanks

Casualties and losses
1,000 rebels killed (Army claim)	115+ soldiers killed

The Rif Dimashq offensive (September–November 2013) was a Syrian government forces and allies offensive in the Rif Dimashq Governorate, that was launched in mid-September 2013, as part of the Syrian Civil War.

== Background ==
Threatened by a Western intervention after the 2013 Ghouta attacks, the Syrian Army had repositioned in early-September. Once the threat had passed, the Army launched the new offensive against rebel positions, primarily in the southern suburbs of Damascus.

== The offensive ==
=== Airport road and Sayyidah Zaynab secured ===
On 10 September, the military and pro-government militiamen made a push into Barzeh in an attempt to capture the district as three air raids were conducted against the suburb. Government forces also attacked the eastern suburb of Deir Salman, near Damascus airport.

=== Western Ghouta Army advances ===
On 9 October, Hezbollah and Iraqi Shiite fighters, backed up by artillery, air-strikes and tanks, attacked and captured the town of Sheikh Omar, on the southern outskirts of Damascus. On 11 October, Army troops and pro-government Shia fighters captured the two southern suburbs of al-Thiabiya and Husseiniya near Damascus, killing at least 70 people. The capture of the three towns, located between the two main highways leading to Jordan, strengthened the government hold on major supply lines and put more pressure on rebels under siege in the Eastern Ghouta area.

On 16 October, the Army, with the help of Hezbollah and Iraqi Shiite militants from the Abul Fadl al-Abbas brigade, captured the strategic town of Bweida, south of Damascus.

On 23 October, the Army sealed any remaining smuggling routes into Eastern Ghouta and intensified its blockade over the region. At this point, there were indications that the military was preparing to start a new phase of its offensive, which will target the Western Ghouta area, south of Damascus.

On 24 October, the military captured the town of Hatetat al-Turkman, which is located southeast of Damascus, along the Damascus International Airport road. Only hours later, some 40 al-Nusra and Liwa al-Islam rebels were killed in an ambush by the Syrian Army near the town of Otaybah, northeast of the International Airport.

On 30 October, an operation conducted by the Syrian Red Crescent, in coordination with the Syrian authorities and the rebels, was allowed to evacuate 800 civilians from Mouadamiyat al-Sham, a rebel town besieged by the Army. A few days earlier, another operation allowed 3,000 civilians to leave.

On 1 November, the Syrian Army, backed by Hezbollah fighters, attacked and advanced in Al-Sabinah. The next day, the military shelled Al-Sabinah while the Army advanced in Barzeh.

On 7 November, the Army, backed by Hezbollah, the Al-Abbas brigade and the National Defense Force, retook the key town of Al-Sabinah, south of Damascus. According to an opposition activist, military "progress on the ground without a doubt, because the regions were besieged for too long. This is normal." Opposition activist director Abdel Rahman also blamed "divisions within the rebels."

On 10 November, government forces launched an attack against Hejeira and A'qraba. By the afternoon, the Army and its allies advanced in Hejeira al-Balad while the military launched an attack against rebel positions in Hajar al-Aswad.

On 11 November, the Army made gains in Barzeh capturing large parts of the neighborhood. Army units also destroyed a tunnel which ran under the neighborhood.

On 12 November, it was reported by Palestinian officials that a truce had been reached to end fighting in the Yarmouk Palestinian refugee camp, however, clashes were still being reported. It was confirmed that PLO representatives were in Damascus to hold talks with government officials. The aim was to reach an agreement under which both the Army and rebel forces would withdraw from the camp, after which, the Syrian police would take over security in the camp, while Army checkpoints would be set up on its outskirts. Recently, government forces managed to advance a few hundred meters into the camp, but rebels were still holed up inside it. The rebel's position had become increasingly difficult in previous weeks due to the Army's advances which threatened to cut rebel supply lines.

On 13 November, government forces captured most of Hejeira, with some pockets of resistance still remaining. Rebels retreated from Hejeira to Hajar al-Aswad, losing their urban cover. However, their defenses in besieged districts closer to the heart of Damascus were still reportedly solid.

On 15 November, government forces captured most of Babila and Yalda, to the east of Hajar al-Aswad. However, state news agency SANA reported continued fighting in Yalda on 19 November.

By 16 November, more than 70 percent of Harasta was under the control of the Army. The next day, according to the opposition activist group the SOHR, three generals and a brigadier-general were among 31 troops killed in a bomb attack that caused a building in the Army transport base in Harasta to collapse. Two days later, the number of soldiers killed in the bomb blast had risen to 68.

On 22 November, government forces captured the town of Hatita in the Damascus countryside.

=== Eastern Ghouta rebel counter-attack ===
On 22 November, rebel forces made an attempt to break the blockade of Eastern Ghouta by attacking the town of Otaiba and a string of military checkpoints encircling the opposition-held Damascus suburbs. Fighting over three days killed 194 combatants. Among the dead were 115 rebels, including seven battalion commanders, and 79 government fighters. 50 of the dead rebels were jihadists, while 20 of the dead pro-government fighters were members of a Shiite Iraqi group and five were Hezbollah militiamen. Seven opposition media activists were killed as well while covering the fighting.

By 25 November, the rebels managed to capture several small villages and checkpoints, but the blockade was still in place. According to a military source, the rebels captured seven villages, but the Army recaptured three of them, with the opposition forces still attempting to capture Otaiba. Fighting was also continuing around the rebel-held town of Marj al-Sultan. A Hezbollah source also confirmed that the rebels captured several villages and Hezbollah positions after their units came under a human wave attack by hundreds of rebel fighters. Following the rebel advance, Hezbollah special forces from Beirut were mobilized and sent to the battle. The SOHR confirmed Hezbollah had sent "hundreds of fighters" to reinforce the Army in its bid to repulse the rebel assault.

On 26 November, the Army hit Marj al-Sultan with five surface-to-surface missiles.

On 27 November, the situation in Eastern Ghouta remained unclear. Several pro-opposition websites claimed rebel advances in the area. However, opposition media activists on the ground in Eastern Ghouta denied the claims and stated that opposition forces were still besieged. Meanwhile, 17 rebel fighters were killed in fighting in the town of Moadamiyeh in Western Ghouta.

On 28 November, another 11 rebels and three Hezbollah fighters were killed in the Marj area.

Between 25 and 28 November, more than 135 rebel fighters and more than 85 government soldiers and militiamen were killed in the offensive, among them five members of the pro-government Iraqi group who were captured and then beheaded by jihadist fighters. The Hezbollah death toll in the clashes had reached 16 since 22 November, according to SOHR, with the overall toll for both sides at this point being around 410. However, according to a Hezbollah commander in Beirut, 21–40 Hezbollah fighters had been killed in the fighting by 25 November, while Lebanese security sources said 25 Hezbollah militiamen died in the previous week, including four who were killed during the Army offensive in the Qalamoun mountains. The most prominent Hezbollah commander in the Damascus countryside, Wissam Sharafeddine, was also killed.

According to Lebanese media, 1,000 rebels were killed during the opposition offensive in Eastern Ghouta, including top military commanders.

== Aftermath – Adra massacre and Al-Otaiba ambush ==
On 11 December, the rebel Islamic Front and Al-Nusra Front groups infiltrated the industrial area of the town of Adra, northeast of Damascus, attacking buildings housing workers and their families. The rebels targeted Alawites, Druse, Christians and Shiites, killing them on a sectarian basis. Some people were shot while others were beheaded. The killings lasted into the next day. In all some 19–40 minority civilians were massacred, as the rebels captured the industrial part of Adra. 18 pro-government militiamen were also killed, including five PLA members. Several rebels died when a Shiite man blew himself up along with them and his family after the rebels attempted to kill them.

On 13 December, the military surrounded Adra and started an operation to push out rebel fighters from the area, making advances in the town during the day. As of the next day, the operation was still continuing.

By 15 December, the number of minority civilians confirmed killed in the rebel attack on Adra had risen to 32. Dozens of others were missing.

On 26 February 2014, some 152–175+ rebels were killed in a single ambush near Otaiba. At least seven others were captured.
