= Rif Dimashq offensive (August–November 2014) =

Syrian Army offensive

- Part of the Syrian civil war (Rif Dimashq Governorate campaign)
Date	29 August – 22 November 2014 (2 months, 3 weeks and 3 days)
Location	Damascus, Syria
Result	Syrian government victory: Army captures Heteta al-Jersh, Adra, Tal Kurdi, Al-Rayhan, the al-Alia farms, Wadi ‘Ayn Tarma, Hosh Al-Farah, Al-Mayda'a, Balaa Al-Jadeeda and most of Jobar; Army recaptures al-Dukhaniyya and Kabbasa after temporarily losing them; Army fails to completely secure Zabdin which continued to be contested

Belligerents
Syrian opposition; Al-Nusra Front; (Syria) Free Syrian Army; UMCEG	(Syria) Syrian Arab Republic: Syrian Armed Forces; Hezbollah; PFLP-GC; Usud al-Cherubim

Commanders and leaders
Abu Mohammad al-Julani (Al-Nusra Front emir); Khaled al-Haboush (Damascus Military Council commander); Zahran Alloush (Jaysh al-Islam leader)	Bashar al-Assad (President of Syria); Issam Zahreddine (Republican Guard Brigade 104 commander)

Units involved
(Syria) Damascus Military Council; Jaysh al-Islam	Syrian Armed Forces; Syrian Army; 4th Armoured Division; Republican Guard; 105th Mechanized Brigades; Lionesses of Defense Armored Battalion; National Defence Forces

Strength
30,000	~25,000

Casualties and losses
678 killed (government and rebel claims)	175 killed (government and rebel claims)

The Rif Dimashq offensive (August–November 2014) was a Syrian Army offensive in the Rif Dimashq Governorate, that was launched in late August 2014, as part of the Syrian civil war.

== Offensive ==
The capture of the town of Al-Malihah by the Syrian Army in mid-August 2014, was followed by an Army push in Jobar later that month. Some 150 rebels were killed during an Army offensive supported by airstrikes on 29 August. Dozens more were killed after the government carried out 25 airstrikes on the neighbourhood on 2 September.

Army and Hezbollah troops also captured the town of Heteta al-Jersh, east of Al-Malihah, after days of heavy fighting.

On 7 September, clashes erupted around al-Dokhania, in an attempt by government forces to re-gain control of al-Dokhania, which was taken over by the al-Nusra Front a day earlier as it killed no fewer than 40 regular soldiers in the area. The next day, fighting in al-Dokhania left 10 rebels dead amid the Army counter-attack. The rebel attack on al-Dokhania was seen as an attempt to ease the pressure on other nearby rebel-held areas which had been coming under an Army attack in previous days.

On 23 September, the SAA unleashed an offensive which led to the capture of the Steel Factory, the ‘Adra Petrol Station, the Detergent Plant, the chemical factory and the ‘Adra Bakery. According to a military source, two of the leaders of Jabhat Al-Islamiyya were killed during the battle. One hundred and two rebels were killed, while the Army and NDF suffered 48 dead.

On 25 September, government forces took full control of Adra al-Omalia (Adra Industrial Sector). Two days later, government troops pressed their offensive and captured the Adra al Balad Area, thus the Army captured all of Adra. Twenty-seven rebels died during the day, while 38 surrendered. 73 soldiers were killed during the battle for the town.

On 28 September, the Army recaptured al-Dukhaniyya, ending the rebels' bid to relieve pressure on the Jobar front.

On 29 September, the situation in the al-Dukhaniyya area remained fluid, while the Army captured Al-Suwan and was fighting for Tal Kurdi as they advanced towards Douma. Sixteen al-Nusra Front fighters were killed in the clashes on the outskirts of al-Dukhaniyya during the day. The next day, fighting continued in the Tal Kurdi and al-Qatari farmlands on the outskirts of Douma.

On 6 October, the Army fully secured the al-Dukhaniyya as it continued the offensive against Douma.

On 8 October, a government source reported the military captured the town of Al-Rayhan, near Douma. This was partially confirmed by the SOHR when it reported, two days later, ongoing clashes in the area with advances by government forces. According to a military source, 53 rebels were killed.

On 11 October, the Republican Guard captured Wadi Ayn Tarma (Ayn Tarma valley) in East Ghouta. According to a military source, nearly 180 Jaysh Al-Islam fighters were killed during the one-month siege of the area, including their top commander. The use of bunker buster bombs by the Air Force was reportedly the deciding factor in the fighting since they exposed and obstructed the rebels' underground supply routes which forced the rebels to retreat and the Republican Guard was able to cross the Baradi river. This brought government forces to the edge of the rebel-held town of Ayn Tarma.

By this time, government forces had also secured Tal Kurdi, Al-Rayhan and the al-Alia farms. This opened the Damascus-Baghdad road and effectively cut all rebel military and relief supplies to Douma.

As of 13 October, according to Al-Masdar News, the Syrian Army controlled 70% of Jobar and was advancing towards Parliament Square. The next day, they reported the Army had secured 75% of Jobar and was attacking rebel positions at the Maysaloun Roundabout. Fifteen rebels were killed in the fighting in Jobar, near al-Zablatani.

On 16 October, rebels launched a counter-attack against the Army's rear flank in Jobar and advanced past the Old Cemetery before the military managed to regroup, repulse their attack and recover lost ground, according to Al-Masdar News. At least 23 rebels and 12 soldiers were killed in the fighting.

On 19 October, the Syrian Army fully captured the Zamalka bridge in the Jobar district which resulted in the loss of multiple supply lines for the rebels in Jobar. The same day, the Syrian Army secured a tunnel network which served as a supply line for the rebels in Jobar.

On 20 October, government troops in Jobar were reinforced with newly trained special forces members.

On 28 October, the Army captured the villages of Hosh Al-Farah and Al-Mayda'a. According to a military source, 42 rebels and 13 soldiers were killed in the fighting. Two days later, the Syrian Army also took over the eastern hub of Jobar, leaving the rebels only in control of the Al-Manasher Roundabout and Parliament Square. On 1 November, fighting in the Hosh Al-Farah area 30 rebels were killed. During this time, dozens of people reportedly entered the al-Qadam area after an agreement was reached between the government and rebels through mediation.

On 6 November, government troops captured the farm area of Balaa Al-Jadeeda, east of Mliha, thus completing the encirclement of the town of Zabdin. Four days later, the Army entered Zabdin from the northeast, following the capture of the farm area southeast of Heteta al-Jersh, and heavy fighting ensued. Clashes also occurred in Der al-Asafir.

On 17 November, the Army captured the Tal Al-Rayhan hill, southwest of Al-Rayhan, breaking a brief rebel siege of the village.

On 22 November, the Army captured Zabdin, or at least a part of it. The fighting left 12 soldiers dead. In the afternoon, an opposition counter-attack was launched resulting in the rebels recapturing some parts of the town before they were pushed back. 40 rebels were killed. Later that night, over 25 soldiers were reportedly killed in a rebel ambush in the Zabdin area which forced government forces to pull back from the area. A pro-government source denied the retreat, although it was later confirmed rebels had recaptured the western part of the town.

== Aftermath – December clashes ==
In early December, fighting continued in Zabdin with troops from the 4th Division reportedly managing to breach rebel defenses in the western part of Zabdin and entering it.

Fighting also intensified in Darayya where the military captured four city blocks, but the situation overall was that both sides were competing in a tireless battle to regain territory. A week later, an opposition source reported that the rebels reversed the Army's gains in the town. On 10 December, the pro-opposition news agency ARA claimed the military imposed their control on Darayya, but it was not independently confirmed.

In mid-December, a military source reported that the 105th Brigade of Republican Guards had the east district of Jobar under complete fire control and that approximately 800 rebels were trapped inside the city district with almost no ways to retreat.
