= Rif Dimashq offensive (March–August 2013) =

Military operation

- Part of the Syrian Civil War (Rif Dimashq Governorate campaign)
- Frontlines in Rif Dimashq from March to August 2013 Syrian Government control Opposition control Contested For a war map of the current situation in Rif Dimashq, see here.
Date	26 March – 22 August 2013 (4 months, 3 weeks and 6 days)
Location	Rif Dimashq, Syria
Result	Syrian government victory: Syrian Army captures the towns of Jdaidet al-Fadl, Jdeidit Artouz, Otaiba, Qaysa, Jarba, Harran Al-Awamid and Abadeh cutting the main rebel supply line into Damascus; Syrian Army surrounds the rebel-held Eastern Ghouta area; Syrian Army surrounds and partially advances into the rebel-held Qaboun, Barzeh and Jobar suburbs; Ghouta gas attacks leave 281–1,729 people dead; Syrian Army launches a new offensive less than a month later

Belligerents
Syrian opposition; Al-Nusra Front; (Syrian opposition) Free Syrian Army; Syrian Islamic Front; Battalions of Hamza ibn Abdul-Muttalib; Islamic State of Iraq and the Levant	(Syria) Syrian Arab Republic; Syrian Armed Forces; National Defense Force; Hezbollah; Liwa Abu al-Fadhal al-Abbas; LAAG

Commanders and leaders
Abu Mohammad al-Julani (WIA) (Al-Nusra Front commander); Khaled al-Haboush (Damascus Military Council commander); Abu Hamza al-Midani (executed) (Abd Allah ibn Abbas Brigade commander)	Bashar al-Assad (President of Syria); Issam Zahreddine (Republican Guard Brigade 104 commander)

Units involved
(Syrian opposition) Free Syrian Army; (Syrian opposition) Damascus Military Council; Syrian Islamic Liberation Front; Liwa al-Islam; Syrian Islamic Front; Ahrar ash-Sham	3rd Armoured Division; 4th Armoured Division; 10th Mechanised Division; 11th Armoured Division; Republican Guard

Strength
20,000 fighters: 750–1,000 al-Nusra fighters	70,000 soldiers, 500 tanks

Casualties and losses
2,125+ fighters killed	1,150+ soldiers killed

The Rif Dimashq offensive (March–August 2013) was a Syrian government forces and allies offensive in the Rif Dimashq Governorate that was launched in late March 2013, as part of the Syrian Civil War.

== Offensive ==
=== Push into Eastern Ghouta ===
During late March 2013, government forces opened a new front in the town of Otaiba, in an effort to divert rebel war-efforts and to attack rebel forces in the eastern Ghouta from the rear.

On 7 April, government force launched an offensive east of Damascus, with the state news agency SANA claiming the military imposed a siege on the rebel-held Eastern Ghouta area. Rebels stated that intensified Army attacks on the area had been going on since mid-March. A rebel commander confirmed that the northern entrance to Ghouta was under siege and an opposition activist stated that a government tank-led assault on Eastern Ghouta had been launched towards the south from the direction of the Damascus international airport.

On 15 April, at least 20 people were killed in air strikes and rocket barrages in the north and east of Damascus. Rebel fighters were reportedly increasing their strength in the Qaboun and Barzeh neighbourhoods to minimise the risk of chemical weapons being used on them, as they would likely inflict casualties on the Syrian Army fighting rebels at close quarters.

On 18 April, "gunmen" assassinated Ali Ballan, head of public relations at the Ministry of Social Affairs and a member of Syria's relief agency, in a restaurant at Mazzeh district.

On 20 April, the Syrian army was pressing to take full control of the town of Jdaidet al-Fadl, southwest of Damascus. Sixty-nine people were killed in the four-day battle, most of them rebels. The fighting also affected the nearby town of Jdeidit Artouz, which is predominantly Christian.

=== Fall of Jdaidet al-Fadl and Otaiba ===
On 21 April, the Syrian Army captured Jdaidet al-Fadl, with the opposition making claims of a massacre being committed. SOHR stated 250 people were killed since the start of the battle for Jdaidet al-Fadl, five days prior, with them being able to document, by name, 127 of the dead, including 27 rebels. Another opposition claim put the death toll at 450. One activist claimed he counted 98 bodies in the town's streets and 86 in makeshift clinics who were summarily executed. Another activist stated they documented 85 people who were executed, including 28 who were killed in a makeshift hospital. The opposition activist group LCC reported 483 people were killed in the battle for the town, around 300 of them civilians and 150 rebels. The Syrian army claimed 190 rebels were killed during the battle and they discovered a mass grave in the town, where they claimed rebels used it to bury their dead and government soldiers and civilian supporters they had killed.

On 24 April, the military captured the town of Otaiba, after a 37-day battle. The Army victory was a major setback for the rebels, as Otaiba was the gateway to Eastern Ghouta and the main, if not the only, weapons supply route for the Damascus area. A rebel fighter predicted other villages in the Eastern Ghouta will fall one after another and the fighting will become a war of attrition. During the fighting, rebels from Otaiba called for reinforcements from Islamist brigades in the area, with whom they were in competition for influence and weapons, but their calls went unanswered. Rebels said they planned to retake the town at all costs.

=== Attack on Jobar and Barzeh ===
On 26 April, government forces continued with their offensive by pushing into the Damascus districts of Jobar and Barzeh, which have a high rebel presence. Troops were encountering heavy rebel resistance as they advanced with air and artillery support. Rebel positions in the nearby Qaboun district were also bombarded with mortars and multiple rocket launchers. An Army siege of the town of Moadamiyet, a rebel stronghold close to Darayya, was also tightening with daily bombardment and a shortage of food.

On 27 April, rebels launched a counter-attack in Otaiba, using both infantry and vehicles. Airstrikes were reported on the town, though most of the battle was taking place on its outskirts and at the Saiqa camp, a Syrian army base.

On April 28, and for the third consecutive day, the Army continued its offensive with heavy fighting in the area of Barzeh.

On 29 April, heavy fighting took place on the outskirts of Damascus International Airport. According to a security source, the fighting took place on the highway leading to the airport and had to be closed for one hour. In the district of Mazzeh, Prime Minister Wael Nader Al-Halqi survived a suicide car bomb targeting his convoy.

=== Continuing Army offensive ===
On 1 May, according to SOHR, fighting took place in the towns of al-Ebada, al-Maliha and Qaysa in the Rif Dimashq.

On 2 May, the Syrian Army captured the town of Qaysa in the eastern Ghouta. A call issued by several activists in the area warned the disparate rebel forces to pull together or face defeat. "If you do not unite under one flag the regime is going to hunt you down, one brigade after another," it said.

Between 4 and 6 May, fighting raged all around Damascus and its countryside with clashes and bombing being reported in the Palestinian refugee camp of Yarmouk, the town of Drosha and the Khan al-Sheikh camp, where the Army was trying to take control of the area, and towns of Beit Sahm, Thiyabiya and Sayyeda Zeinab and Huseiniya camp. Fighting also raged in Derkhabiya al-Buweida and the Barzeh neighbourhood. Although fighting was still ongoing in the outskirts of Drosha after two days of clashes, according to SORH, there were reports of a partial retreat of regular forces from the area. The Syrian military claimed that their troops captured the towns of al-Abbada and Ghraika in Eastern Ghouta, but there was no independent confirmation.

On 8 May, the leader of the Al-Nusra Front rebel group, Abu Mohammad al-Golani, was wounded during an artillery bombardment south of Damascus.

On 9 May, the Syrian Army captured the town of Jarba. Meanwhile, mortars were being fired into Jaramana, a government-controlled town.

In the following days fighting continued in the Barzeh and Jobar neighbourhoods of Damascus, where a rebel commander was killed in clashes with the local pro-government militia. Fighting was also once again reported in Qaysa.

=== Rebel counter-attack ===
On 14 May, several rebel brigades, including the Islamist Al Nusra Front, united temporarily under the same command and launched operation Al Furqaan. The stated aim of the operation is an attempt to recapture Otaiba and to try and reopen the rebel supply line into Damascus and the Ghouta area. In the case they recapture Otaiba, they planned to press on towards the Damascus international airport. SOHR said that Islamic units, including Jabhat al-Nusra, and Syrian opposition fighters were battling around Otaiba. However, by the next day, there was little evidence of the renewed fighting around Otaiba available on the usual opposition YouTube channels, so it was impossible to independently confirm the extent of the fighting.

On 15 May, rebels claimed to have recaptured the town of Qaysa. However, in early June, the town was still reported to be government-held. The Army capture of Harran Al-Awamid and Abadeh was also reported.

=== Renewed Army push ===
On 27 May, Hezbollah forces reportedly engaged in combat operations against the rebels in the Eastern Ghouta area. Hezbollah fighters had captured nine towns in the Al-Murj area neighboring Ghouta and opposition activists claimed thousands of members of the Lebanese group were training in an air force intelligence center near Damascus International Airport.

On 28 May, the Army launched a major operation against the Barzeh neighborhood in Damascus. Government troops advanced 400 meters in the district, after attacking from the north, east and south-east. The aim of the operation was to isolate the rebel area near Qaboun. It was also reported that the military reached the town of Adra, east of Damascus, completing a sweep through rebel-held territory and cutting more rebel supply lines. The Army was planning to continue their push to the west, squeezing the rebels between the advancing forces and the government-held areas in Damascus.

By 30 May, rebel forces in Eastern Ghouta were surrounded and pleading for reinforcements and aid to be sent as they feared government troops were "preparing to commit more massacres". The next day, Hisham Jaber, a retired Lebanese army general who heads the Middle East Center for Studies and Political Research in Beirut, said that government troops cleared up to 80 percent of the areas around the capital during the offensive.

On 2 June, during intense clashes between rebels and government forces in the Jobar district of Damascus, a car bomb exploded near a police station, killing nine policemen. Also, near the Lebanese town of Ain el-Jaouze, which is close to the border area between Lebanon and Syria, and Damascus itself, Hezbollah fighters attacked a rebel rocket team which was reportedly preparing to fire rockets into Shi'ite areas of the Lebanese Beqaa Valley. 14–17 rebels and one Hezbollah fighter were killed.

On 4 June, state TV claimed that government troops had pushed out rebels from the Jobar district. Opposition sources were not available for comment on the claim. Government troops, reinforced by hundreds of Hezbollah fighters, attempted to infiltrate Madhamiya. Opposition activists claimed that during the attempt, two Hezbollah members, including a field commander, were killed. More government forces were also being deployed at Darayya.

On 11 June, rebel forces suffered heavy casualties when 27 of their fighters were killed in an Army ambush in the al-Marj area of Eastern Ghouta, while they were attempting to break through the military blockade to bring in supplies. Another seven fighters were missing.

On 15 June, state TV reported that government troops had captured the Ahmadiyeh suburb of Damascus, which is part of Eastern Ghouta. A rebel commander confirmed there was fighting in the area a day earlier. An Army source also claimed that troops captured parts of the nearby town of Khamissiyeh.

On 16 June, a large car-bomb was detonated at an Army checkpoint outside the Mazzeh Military Airport, killing 10 soldiers and wounding 10 others. According to SOHR, the car-bomb was followed by smaller explosions from rockets fired by rebels.

=== Battle for the suburbs ===
On 18 June, the Army launched operations in an attempt to storm rebel-held parts of the Damascus Qaboun district. As of 22 June, the rebels were still managing to hold the military forces back. The Army was also making attempts to storm the Barzeh district, where rebels were defending against the military's push.

On 19 June, Army and Hezbollah forces clashed with rebels near the Khomeini hospital in the village of Zayabiyeh, close to the Shiite Sayyidah Zaynab Mosque. Government forces were attempting to capture villages near Zayabiyeh and Babila, which were both shelled by the Army. The Army was reportedly advancing towards Zayabiyeh, which is just south of the Damascus suburb in which the shrine was located. State TV claimed that government troops managed to capture the neighborhood of al-Bahdaliya, outside Sayyidah Zaynab, while the rebels claimed of being able to capture the hospital.

On 20 June, Army forces were slowly but steadily advancing in the Al-Murj area of Eastern Ghouta, where they had captured several towns, and were also advancing in the Sayyidah Zaynab area. Rebels confirmed they were still surrounded in Eastern Ghouta, with no way of escape.

In the coming weeks, Hezbollah and Iraqi Shi'ite militia forces captured the areas of Bahdaliyeh and Hay al Shamalneh on the south-eastern approaches to the capital.

On 25 June, the attack on Qaboun had entered its sixth day. Army forces also launched a large offensive on other districts across Damascus and its outskirts. According to SOHR, "The army is trying to take over Qaboon, Barzeh, Jobar, Al-Hajar Al-Aswad and Yarmouk". They also added that "The army doesn't have the capacity to take over these neighborhoods, and the rebels are fighting back. But the humanitarian situation there is catastrophic." Still, rebels stated that the Army was making a "grinding advance" against them and they were in fear of losing arms supply routes into the capital, which would be a severe blow to their attempts to capture Damascus. By 27 June, according to SOHR, the Syrian Army took control of parts of Barzeh.

On 6 July, government forces overran the industrial area of Qaboun. With the capture of the industrial area Qaboun was besieged and rebel lines towards the town of Harasta were cut. T-72 tanks surrounded the district while artillery on high ground in the center of the capital heavily shelled Qaboun for a week.

On 13 July, the Army captured the al-A'mri mosque in Qaboun.

On 14 July, a government official stated that Army troops had recaptured 60 percent of the Jobar district. Reporters were led on a military tour of the recaptured areas which suffered massive destruction. Fighting was also continuing around the al-A'mri mosque in Qaboun after the military captured it along with 200 people who were inside at the time.

On 15 July, government troops backed by tanks and artillery moved into Qaboun after breaching rebel defenses. Opposition activists claimed Republican Guards troops detained hundreds of people in public places to prevent rebel fighters from hitting their forces. The next day, rebels sent reinforcements to the district.

=== Continued fighting ===
On 21 July, government forces ambushed a rebel force near the town of Adra, northeast of Damascus. 49 rebels were killed. An elite Republican Guard officer who led the ambush was also killed.

On 26 July, pro-government Palestinian officers claimed to have captured a third of the rebel-held Yarmouk camp in fighting in which government Palestinian militias were also involved. Two days later, rebels claimed to have captured the Jobar-Qaboun highway, however it was not independently confirmed.

On 6 August, a possible mutiny occurred in the ranks of the government forces, after hundreds of Druze militiamen belonging to the "popular committees" militias handed their weapons back in and abandoned their posts in Jarmana district, choosing to return home. The desertions were either due to the arrest of a Druze militia leader, the militiamen not receiving their salaries or the militia's unwillingness to let their area be used as a platform to shell East Ghouta.

On the next day, 62 rebels were killed and eight went missing after another Army ambush near Adra.

On 10 August, the Syrian army stormed the town of al-Ghazlaniya and several houses were raided.

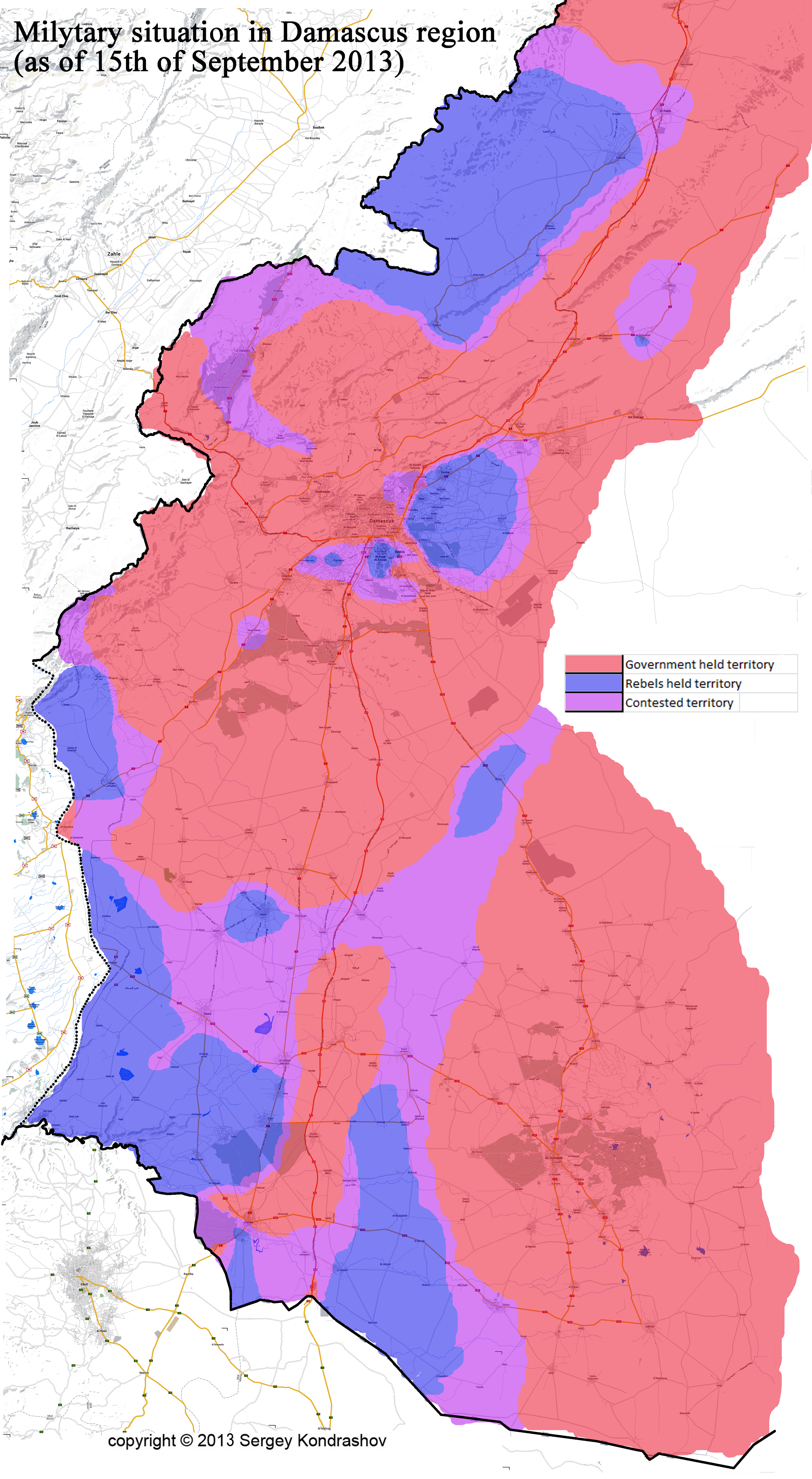
Territories held by government forces, by rebels or under continuous clashes as of September 2013.

On 16 August, mortar fire by the Syrian Army on the Mleha district, southeast of Damascus, killed at least 14 civilians, four of them children. The evening's bombardment came as troops pressed a months-old offensive in the suburbs of Damascus in a bid to clear the region of rebel rear bases, according to SOHR.

=== Ghouta gas attacks ===
On 21 August, a chemical attack on the Ghouta region claimed lives of hundreds of people, both civilians and rebels. Estimates of dead varied from 355 up to 1,429.

On 22 August, according to the Syrian opposition, the Syrian Army launched a new offensive against rebel positions in Rif Dimashq. The Army entered Erbine, Harasta, Jobar, Zamalka and Ain Tarma, but without taking full control. They did however capture strategic points.

== Aftermath - Renewed Army Offensive ==
Threatened by a Western intervention after the 2013 Ghouta attacks, the Syrian Army had repositioned in early-September.

On 1 September, 46 rebel fighters were killed after they attacked Army positions in Rouhaiba, northeast of Damascus. The fighting began at dawn and lasted throughout the day, including air raids on Rouhaiba and clashes outside the town. The next day, for a third time in just over a month, government forces ambushed rebels in the industrial area of Adra killing 29 rebel fighters.

On 3 September, rebels of the Free Syrian Army stormed a government position in the mountainous area of Al Qalamoun.

On 6 September, the Army launched an operation with the apparent intention to retake the town of Mouadamiyat al-Sham. On 8 September, according to SOHR, fighting continued in the north of Mouadamiyat al-Sham.

Once the threat of western air-strikes had passed, the Army launched a new offensive against rebel positions on 10 September, primarily in the southern suburbs of Damascus.
