= Battle of Harasta (2017–2018) =

Military operation

- Part of the Rif Dimashq Governorate campaign (Syrian Civil War)
Date	First phase: 14–25 November 2017 (1 week and 4 days); Second phase: 29 December 2017 – 17 January 2018 (2 weeks and 5 days)
Location	Harasta, Damascus and Rif Damascus, Syria
Result	Indecisive: On 7 January, the Syrian Army lifts the siege of Harasta vehicle base laid by rebels on 29 December; Rebels retain control of the captured al-Ajami neighborhood

Belligerents
Ahrar al-Sham; Al-Rahman Legion; Hay'at Tahrir al-Sham	(Syria) Syrian Arab Republic; Russia; Arab Nationalist Guard; Fatah al-Intifada

Commanders and leaders
Saleh 'Antar † (commander of Ahrar al-Sham forces in Harasta, per pro-government sources, FSA per pro-opposition sources); Asim Basha Abu Jafar al-Shami (Ahrar al-Sham regional commander); Abu Thaer Sawan † (al-Rahman Legion's 10th Brigade commander); Hassan Al-Boshi † (al-Rahman Legion field commander in Harasta ) Abu Talal Al-Qabouni † (Tahrir al-Sham top commander); Abu Mohammad Tahoun † (Tahrir al-Sham field commander)	(Syria) Maj. Gen. Walid Khawashqi † (Syria) Brig. Gen. Mohammad Nayouf (Republican Guard's 105th Brigade commander) (Syria) Brig. Gen. Ali Badran † (Special Forces Commander) (Syria) Brig. Gen. Mohamed Jenad † (Syria) Brig. Gen. Ali Diyub † (Republican Guard's 138th Armored Regiment commander) (Syria) Brig. Gen. Habib Mehrez Yunus † (Syria) Brig. Gen. Ibrahim Yunus † (Republican Guard's 402nd Battalion commander) (Syria) Brig Gen. Haider Hassan † (Syria) Brig. Gen. Muhsin Baaiti (WIA) (Syria) Maj. Gen. Hassan al-Kurdi (WIA)

Units involved
Ahrar al-Sham; Al-Rahman Legion; 10th Brigade; Hay'at Tahrir al-Sham	Syrian Armed Forces; Syrian Army; Republican Guard; 104th Brigade; 105th Brigade; 106th Brigade; 402nd Battalion; 3rd Armoured Division; Qalamoun Shield Forces; Storming battalions; 4th Armoured Division; 42nd Brigade; 555th Special Forces Regiment; 9th Armoured Division; 10th Mechanised Division; 14th Special Forces Division; 556th Regiment; National Defence Forces; Air Force Intelligence Directorate; Ground forces; Ministry of Interior; Criminal Security Directorate; Damascus Police; Syrian Special Mission Forces

Casualties and losses
First phase: 50 killed and 50 wounded (SAA claim) Second phase: 94+ killed (SOHR claim)	First phase: 54+ killed (per SOHR); Second phase: 47+ killed (SAA claim); 79+ killed, 15 captured (SOHR claims) Overall: 331–488 killed (Bellingcat claim)
- First phase: 41 civilians killed Second phase: 170–190 civilians killed

The Battle of Harasta, codenamed "They Were Wronged", was a military operation launched by Syrian rebels against positions of the Syrian Arab Army in Harasta, a northeastern suburb of Damascus, during the Syrian Civil War

== Background ==
Harasta, in the eastern Ghouta area, had been a rebel-held city for parts of the Syrian Civil War, despite its close proximity to the government-held capital. After the government's victory in Eastern Aleppo in late 2016, government forces turned their attention to the Damascus suburbs, targeting Wadi Barada, and eastern Ghouta (see Qaboun offensive (2017)). During the East Ghouta inter-rebel conflict (April–May 2017), rebel groups Tahrir al-Sham, Ahrar Al-Sham, Jaysh al-Islam and Free Syrian Army-affiliated al-Rahman Legion vied for control of the area. This fighting came to an end in late spring.

On 22 July 2017, the Russian Ministry of Defense announced that a de-escalation agreement had been signed in Eastern Ghouta following talks between Russian military officials and Jaysh al Islam. On 16 August 2017, a Failaq al Rahman representative and a Russian representative signed an agreement which established Failaq al Rahman's inclusion in the de-escalation zone. This agreement came into effect on 18 August 2017.

Despite the de-escalation treaty, the Syrian Observatory for Human Rights (SOHR) reported that government bombing resumed in Eastern Ghouta on 27 September 2017. In October, the government restricted the use of the al-Wafideen crossing, an entry point for merchandise, which led to food and medical supply shortages within Ghouta. According to the UN and Human Rights Watch, in late October and November 2017, hostilities intensified, with frequent reports of shelling on several densely populated areas of eastern Ghouta. These attacks reportedly targeted Harasta (including one reported strike on a kindergarten on 6 November), as well as Ein Tarma, Jobar, Kafr Batna, and Jisreen (where a mortar attack on 31 October killed six children, according to Human Rights Watch). Further attacks targeted Mesraba, Hamouriyah and Saqba.

== The offensive ==
=== First phase ===
On 14 November, a rebel attack was launched on the government armoured-vehicle base in Harasta. The rebel forces, led by Ahrar al-Sham, also launched an assault against Syrian Army positions in the Police Housing area of the Harasta suburb. Shortly after, the rebels captured an army outpost and killed Major General Walhid Khawashqi. Two points within the perimeter of the base were captured by the militants on the morning of 15 November. According to pro-government sources, the points were recaptured by the army in the evening amid airstrikes on rebel positions conducted by the Russian Air Force. The rebel attack was considered by the Syrian government to be a violation of the Russian-brokered de-escalation zones put in place in May. In retaliatory attacks, aerial strikes and shelling hit Harasta, Irbin, Mesraba, Hamouriyah, and Saqba towns in Eastern Ghouta with at least eight civilians killed and about 94 wounded in the first 20 hours.

On 16 November, Ahrar al-Sham reportedly captured a command post near the Regiment 46 base. In retaliation for the Ahrar al-Sham attack, the government conducted an aerial bombardment of rebel-held areas, according to an Agence France-Presse photographer and opposition sources. The World Health Organization reported that from 14 to 17 November, 84 people were killed and 659 injured, including hundreds of women and children. Human Rights Watch documented that Hamouriyah, a densely populated residential town near the center of the besieged enclave controlled by Faylaq al-Rahman, was repeatedly struck by Russian or Syrian cluster munitions on 19 November, and multiple airstrikes hit Irbin on 23 November.

On 25 November, all of the areas captured by the rebels in Harasta were reported by pro-government sources to have been retaken by government forces, but the rebels said they repelled the army's attack on their positions inside the base. Government aircraft were reported to have bombed a crowded public market in Misraba, 1.5 km (0.93 mi) to the east, as part of its counterattack on rebel positions, killing at least 16 civilians. From 14 to 30 November, the Russian-Syrian joint military operation conducted over 400 airstrikes on eastern Ghouta, according to Civil Defense, and SOHR reported that at least 127 people, including 30 children, had been killed by air strikes and shelling in the offensive by the end of the month.

Harasta and other rebel-held parts of the eastern Ghouta were considered to be suffering from a humanitarian crisis due to the government siege. Residents were "so short of food that they [were] eating trash, fainting from hunger and forcing their children to eat on alternate days", the U.N. World Food Programme said. On 6 December, the World Health Organization reported nearly 500 sick and wounded patients still await medical evacuation from eastern Ghouta, which the Syrian government had not granted. Several Syrian and Russian airstrikes on densely populated areas were reported in this period in connection with the Harasta fighting, including one on Harasta on 3 December in which children were reportedly killed and two, on a marketplace and a medical facility, leading to 18 civilian deaths, in nearby Hamouriyah the same day.

=== Second phase ===
Map of the battle

On 29 December 2017, rebels commenced the second phase of the offensive. Pro-government sources reported that HTS used a car bomb on army positions in Harasta early in the day. Later in the day, Ahrar al-Sham, HTS and Al-Rahman Legion seized over 50 buildings to the west of the base and besieged it, cutting off all supply lines. The rebels also said they took more positions in the Vehicle Base itself. 47 SAA and NDF soldiers were killed in the ongoing offensive, while pro-government reinforcements were being sent to the frontline. On 30 December, a paramedic working for a hospital in Harasta was killed as a result of artillery shelling, according to aid organisations. The UN reported that the Syrian government and Russia began a new air and land offensive on 31 December to reclaim ground in eastern Ghouta. That day, a primary health care center in Harasta was impacted by an airstrike, resulting in minor structural damage, according to aid organisations.

== The defensive ==
On 1 January, fighting raged around the municipal building for hours after rebels reportedly detonated a second car bomb. By the end of the day, the Syrian Army said it had recaptured the Harasta bus station and pushed rebel forces back from the municipal building, while reportedly killing "tens" of rebels. Meanwhile, Ahrar al-Sham said it was negotiating a passage out for government forces trapped at the Vehicle Base. According to opposition sources, at least 34 rebels were killed and dozens wounded from both sides since the beginning of the second phase. Pro-government and Russian bombings killed at least 36 civilians and wounded many more in rebel-controlled Harasta as well. On 2 January, the Syrian Army reportedly recaptured four blocks near the municipal building and were pushing towards the Al-Barazi hospital. Meanwhile, rebels were still trying to capture the Vehicle Base and municipal building, despite heavy artillery and airstrikes, managing to widen their control of the army base.

On 3 January, the Syrian Army and Russian Air Force escalated bombing of rebel-held areas with the intention of relieving the 200 troops trapped in the base. Strikes on Mesraba and Arbin on 4 January reportedly caused dozens of deaths, including civilians and children. On 4 January, the Syrian Army began their counter-offensive to relieve the siege on the Armoured Vehicle Base. Government forces recaptured "dozens of buildings" and the Syrian Army advanced to within 400 metres (1,300 ft) of the Vehicle Base. During the fighting, an air-strike hit a building near the rebel positions, leaving 16 rebel fighters dead. On 5 January, the Syrian army reportedly recaptured the Basher Hospital from the rebels as part of a renewed push in Harasta district and were within 100 metres (330 ft) of the military vehicle depot base from the western direction. Further pro-government airstrikes on residential areas of Harasta were reported on 6 January.

On 7 January, pro-government sources reported that the 4th Armoured Division captured a mill to the west of the base, enabling them to announce that they had broken the siege. The Syrian Observatory for Human Rights reported that government forces had opened a road to the base. The following morning, SOHR reported the Division was attempting to widen the corridor opened to the vehicle base, while the rebels were trying to close the gap. Meanwhile, the rebels advanced on the opposite eastern side of the vehicle base, capturing two buildings in the area of the Technical Institute. On 9 January, airstrikes on residential areas of eastern Ghouta continued, with reports of 24 deaths, including 10 children, and at least 13 civilians killed in opposition-controlled Hamourya. By 10 January, the UN had reported at least 85 civilian deaths since 31 December, including 30 children. On 11 January, Civil Defense reported that 85 pro-government airstrikes hit Harasta that day.

On 12 January, the rebels repelled a large Syrian Army attack, despite pro-government claims that the army and allies managed to recapture all of the territories they had lost to the rebels two weeks earlier. On the same day, the Syrian army captured three farms in the area between Douma and Harasta and was also able to advance in five buildings in the vicinity of the Karajat Al-Hajz (Harasta bus station) near the Governorate Building in the vicinity of Harasta. It was reported that Syrian government forces fired three surface-to-surface missiles filled with poisonous chlorine gas between the cities of Harasta and Douma on 13 January. By 14 January, Civil Defense reported that 177 civilians, including 51 children, had been killed in the previous two weeks, and 811 more have been wounded, while the Syrian Observatory for Human Rights said that the offensive had killed about 190 people. UNICEF reported that over 30 children were killed and two medical facilities bombed. By 17 January, the rebels said that a total of 231 government soldiers, including 107 officers, had been killed in fighting since the base was surrounded in late December.

Fighting in Harasta caused mass displacement. On 11 January 2018, the town's local council estimated that at least 900 families had fled since the beginning of January. The UN reported at least 85 people, including 30 children, killed, and at least 183 injured, by airstrikes and artillery fire across eastern Ghouta since 31 December in the same period. Residents of Harasta reported moving underground to escape the bombs.

== Renewed operation ==
On 20 January, Syrian government forces announced renewed operations in the area, between Harasta and Erbeen. This offensive was led by Republican Guard and 4th Division fighters. The government reported that dozens of Faylaq al-Rahman and HTS fighters had been killed in action. On 22 January, local correspondents of Turkish Anadolu Agency reported air and artillery strikes on Harasta. On 1 February, SOHR reported that at least 27 shells targeted Harasta. Aid agencies reported that residents were now permanently sheltered in basements and underground shelters. 15,000 residents of Harasta, Modira, and Al Marj were displaced that week to other areas in the Eastern Ghouta enclave.

On 6 February, local activists reported a new wave of strikes, including ground-to-ground missile strikes on Harasta. On 8 February, one person was killed by rebel mortar fire in the government-controlled part of Harasta, according to state news agency SANA. Opposition activists reported that 600 air raids had been conducted on Harasta from 5 January to 9 February. On 10 February, government sources reported they had "inched forward" in Harasta. Civil Defence and SOHR reported multiple air raids on Harasta during the night of 11 February. Ground fighting continued into the following week, with Al-Masdar reporting on 14 February that SAA and rebel fighters had "traded offensives" in the suburb, causing "some of the fiercest firefights" of 2018.

The Rif Dimashq offensive (February 2018) began on 18 February, with heavy bombing across Eastern Ghouta. The UN humanitarian coordinator for the Syria crisis said on 23 February that 80% of people in Harasta were now living in basements to escape the bombs. The place was bombed again on 23 and 24 February.

A UN resolution on 25 February called for a 30-day ceasefire across Syria. Government ground troops advanced, with Syrian state TV claiming to have captured several buildings in Harasta, and Civil Defence reporting air and artillery attacks. On 26 February, Syrian state TV broadcast live footage showing Harasta being pounded by airstrikes and artillery, saying the target was HTS fighters. The fighting was mostly concentrated in the Harasta Farms area on the edge of town. Monitors and Civil Defense reported civilian mortalities in the fighting. On 23 March 2018, the Syrian army captured Harasta.
