= Qalamoun offensive (2017) =

Military operation of the Syrian Civil War

- Part of the Syrian civil war spillover in Lebanon
- Battle of Western Qalamoun (2013–2017) Syrian Government & Hezbollah control Lebanese Government & Hezbollah control Syrian Opposition control For a war map of the current situation in Rif Dimashq, see here.
Date	21 July 2017 – 28 August 2017 (1 month and 1 week)
Location	Western Qalamoun Mountains, Lebanon–Syria border
Result	Syrian/Lebanese governments and Hezbollah victory: Saraya Ahl al-Sham surrender, transferred with their families to eastern Qalamoun; 7,000 Syrian refugees and Tahrir al-Sham fighters transferred to Idlib; Hezbollah took over the Arsal valley and concluded a ceasefire with members of Tahrir al-Sham on the transfer to the province of Idlib; ISIL remnants agree to withdraw to Abu Kamal.; The Lebanese and Syrian governments gain full control of the Syrian-Lebanese border for the first time in six years.; End of the Syrian Civil War spillover in Lebanon

Belligerents
(Syria) Syrian Government (Lebanon) Lebanese Government; Hezbollah; Iran; Support: United States	Hay'at Tahrir al-Sham (surrendered); Free Syrian Army (surrendered)	Islamic State (surrendered)

Commanders and leaders
Hassan Nasrallah (Secretary-General of Hezbollah) (Iran) Qasem Soleimani (Lebanon) Michel Aoun (Commander-in-chief) (Lebanon) Joseph Aoun (Commander of the LAF)	Abu al-Malik al-Talli (surrendered) (HTS emir of Qalamoun)	Muawfaq Abu al-Sus (surrendered) (ISIL emir of Qalamoun); Ahmad Wahid al-Abd (surrendered) (ISIL commander and high-ranking jurist)

Units involved
Syrian Armed Forces; Syrian Air Force; Syrian Army; 1st Armoured Division; 3rd Armoured Division; Qalamoun Shield Forces; (Lebanon) Lebanese Armed Forces; Lebanese Air Force; (Lebanon) Lebanese Army; 5th Heavy Infantry Mechanized Brigade; 7th Light Infantry Brigade; 1st Artillery Regiment; Hezbollah military; Light infantry; Mechanized infantry; Iraqi Shia militias; Liwa Zulfiqar; Quds Force; United States special operations forces	Hay'at Tahrir al-Sham; Jabhat Fateh al-Sham; Free Syrian Army; Saraya Ahl al-Sham	Islamic State; Damascus Wilayah

Strength
4,000 fighters (Lebanon) 3,000 troops	1,500 militants	600 militants

Casualties and losses
24 fighters killed (Lebanon) 3 soldiers killed	150 militants killed	20 militants killed 100+ militants surrendered

The Qalamoun offensive (2017) was a military operation launched by Hezbollah, the Syrian Arab Armed Forces, and later the Lebanese Armed Forces, against members of Tahrir al-Sham and the Islamic State (IS) on the Lebanon–Syria border. The Lebanese Army denied any coordination with Hezbollah or the Syrian Army.

== The offensive ==
=== First phase: Clearing of Tahrir al-Sham ===
The Iranian-backed Shia group Hezbollah, the Lebanese Armed Forces, and the Syrian Arab Army launched a major operation on 21 July 2017, to destroy the pockets of HTS and ISIL fighters on the Lebanon-Syria border. During the offensive, the Lebanese Army assumed a defensive position in Arsal. By the following day, Hezbollah reportedly captured key points near the border, including the strategic hilltop of Dhahr al-Huwa, a former Tahrir al-Sham (al-Nusra Front) base. As of 23 July, the Syrian Army captured 36 square miles of terrain on the Syrian side of the border.

On 27 July, a three-day ceasefire agreement was reached by Hezbollah with Tahrir al-Sham and Saraya Ahl al-Sham in the Lebanese portion of the Qalamoun Mountains. The agreement called for Tahrir al-Sham forces to withdraw from Lebanon to Idlib, Saraya Ahl al-Sham forces to withdraw to the eastern Qalamoun Mountains, where rebel forces maintain a pocket of control, and exchanges of prisoners from both sides. On the same day, Hezbollah announced that there would be further military operations against the ISIL pocket.

=== Second phase: Offensive against ISIL ===
On 4 August, Hezbollah commander Hasan Nasrallah announced that the Syrian Arab Army and Hezbollah would participate in the recapture of the ISIL pocket on the Syrian-Lebanese border for the first time since 2013. The Lebanese Army announced that it will not coordinate with the Syrian Army during the offensive. Two days later, the Lebanese Armed Forces launched an assault on ISIL positions near the Shabeb Canyon. After a series of intense clashes, the Lebanese Army captured the sites and pushed on to the Abu 'Ali and al-Dalel al-'Aqra hills in the Ras Ba'albak region. The hills were also eventually seized. Further Lebanese Army advance was reported on the countryside of Jaroud Arsal and Ras Balbak involving mechanised forces.

In the morning of 19 August, the Lebanese Army renewed its offensive against ISIL in the Lebanese portion of the Qalamoun Mountains, while the Syrian Army and Hezbollah launched an offensive in the Syrian side of the border. Later in the day Syrian Arab Army's Republican Guard and Hezbollah captured Abu Khadeir and Mass’oud valleys, Sha’abat Srour, Qabr Al-‘Arsali, Khirbat Al-‘Aylat, Abu Khadeij Point, and Shalouf Point alongside the border with Lebanon.

On 25 August, around 100 ISIL fighters surrendered to Hezbollah on the Syrian side of the western Qalamoun Mountains. By the same day, ISIL held only 40 square kilometres of territory on the border. On 27 August, the Lebanese Army announced a ceasefire in order to negotiate over 9 Lebanese soldiers who were captured by ISIL during the Battle of Arsal in August 2014.

On 27 August, the remaining ISIL holdouts in the western Qalamoun agreed to the ceasefire with the Lebanese Army in Lebanon and Hezbollah and the Syrian Army on the Syrian side of the border. On the next day, ISIL fighters burned their headquarters in the area, and prepared to be transferred to Abu Kamal. This was the first time that such a large group of ISIL fighters had agreed to a surrender deal.

== Aftermath ==
On 29 August, a first convoy of about 400 ISIL fighters and their families were transported from the Lebanon-Syria border towards Abu Kamal in Deir ez-Zour. As the convoy of evacuated ISIL fighters and their families moved from the exchange point toward Abu Kamal, it was bombed by CJTF–OIR. The coalition stated that it "was not a party to any agreement between the Iranian-backed Shia militia Hezbollah, the Syrian regime and ISIS" and that it would not allow the "further transport of ISIS fighters to the border area of our Iraqi partners". CJTF–OIR also claimed that their attack had only targeted the road and "individual vehicles and fighters that were clearly identified as ISIS", not the civilians accompanying the convoy. Consequently, the convoy of ISIL fighters became stranded in central Syria between Humayma and al-Sukna as the coalition maintained that they would not allow the convoy to continue. After hearing of this convoy's fate, a second group of 113 ISIL militants and their families from Qalamoun decided to refrain from trying to reach Abu Kamal. Instead, they left ISIL and fully surrendered to the Syrian government, which settled them in Palmyra under security supervision.

== See also ==
- Battle of Qalamoun (2013)
- Qalamoun offensive (June–August 2014)
  - Battle of Arsal (2014)
- Qalamoun offensive (May–June 2015)
