= Ziad Fahd =

- Born: Syria
- Military career
- Allegiance: Ba'athist Syria (– 28 March 2012); Syrian National Council (28 March 2012–present)
- Branch: Free Syrian Army
- Rank: Brigadier General
- Unit: Southern Front
- Commands: Damascus Military Council
- Conflicts: Syrian civil war

Ziad Fahd (Arabic: زياد فهد) is a Free Syrian Army brigadier general, who defected from the Syrian Army to the FSA on March 28, 2012. He currently holds the position of deputy chief of staff in the Southern Front. He is also a former member of the General Command of the Joint Command Council and former head of the Damascus Military Council. He has attempted to bolster more moderate forces in the South through outreach to Jordan.
