= Al-Dumayr offensive (April 2016) =

April 2016 military offensive by ISIS

- Part of the Rif Dimashq Governorate campaign of the Syrian civil war
Date	4–16 April 2016 (1 week and 5 days)
Location	Al-Dumayr, Rif Dimashq Governorate, Syria
Result	Syrian Army victory

Belligerents
Islamic State	(Syria) Syrian Arab Republic Jaysh al-Islam

Commanders and leaders
Abu Jihad al-Shami	Unknown

Units involved
Military of ISIL	Syrian Armed Forces: Syrian Army; National Defence Forces; Qalamoun Shield Forces

Casualties and losses
(Islamic State) 35 militants killed	20 killed
- 18 civilians killed by airstrikes 250–300 cement plant workers kidnapped by ISIL (170 released, 4 executed)

The al-Dumayr offensive was a military offensive launched in April 2016 by the Islamic State near the town of al-Dumayr, east of Damascus, Syria. The attack is notable for the abduction of hundreds of cement plant workers by ISIL.

== The offensive ==
On 4 April, ISIL attacked areas around the city of al-Dumayr, northeast of Damascus, resulting in 250–300 cement plant workers being abducted from a factory by ISIL. ISIL reportedly massacred 175 of them afterwards, while 75 escaped. Druze employees were murdered while non-minority Muslims were released.

On 6 April, ISIL launched an attack on the Dumayr Airbase, outside the town, sending five car bombs and killing 12 Syrian soldiers. The attack was repelled by the Syrian Army and the National Defence Forces. Due to a partial ceasefire, the Syrian Armed Forces reportedly allowed some Jaysh al-Islam militants from Ghouta to cross into al-Dumayr in order to fight ISIL. The Syrian Air Force also hit ISIL targets in the front with the rebels.

On 9 April, a new ISIL attack on the airport and power plant was reportedly repelled, after which the airport was declared secured.

On 11 April, a Syrian Air Force plane was shot down by ISIL near the airbase. Two days later, yet another attack on the airbase was repelled, although Army checkpoints outside the base had sustained heavy damage.

On 14 April, the Army launched a counter-attack, quickly recapturing several hilltops, and by the following day, they had retaken control of the Khan Abu Shamat base and the Badia cement plant. On 16 April, the military continued to advance and recaptured the Battalion 559 base, Al-Sini Factory, Al-Safa Station and the triangle Baghdad-Palmyra-Jordan checkpoint, ending the ISIL offensive.
