= 14th Special Forces Division =

- فرقة القوات الخاصة الرابعة عشرة
- Syrian Special Forces Patch
- Active: 1968 – 2024
- Country: Ba'athist Syria (surrendered)
- Allegiance: Syrian Arab Armed Forces (surrendered)
- Branch: Syrian Arab Army (surrendered)
- Type: Special forces
- Role: Close-quarters combat Counter-insurgency; Counter-terrorism; Direct action Raiding; Reconnaissance; Special operations Unconventional warfare Urban warfare
- Size: 3 regiments
- Part of: 2nd Corps (surrendered)
- Garrison/HQ: Damascus
- Tactical color marking
- Engagements: Yom Kippur War; Lebanese Civil War; Islamist uprising in Syria; Siege of Aleppo; Hama Massacre; Syrian Civil War; Siege of Homs; Damascus offensive; Battle of Harasta (2017–2018); Rif Dimashq offensive (February–April 2018); 2018 Southern Syria offensive; As-Suwayda offensive (August–November 2018)

Commanders
- Current Commander: Maj. Gen. Ali Asaad
- Notable commanders: Maj. Gen. Ali Haydar; Maj. Gen. Bassel al-Assad; Maj. Gen. Ali Habib Mahmud; Maj. Gen. Mufid Hassan; Maj. Gen. Fuad Masaoud

The 14th Special Forces Division (Arabic: فرقة القوات الخاصة الرابعة عشرة) was a division of the Syrian Armed Forces specializing in light infantry operations. The Division was part of the Syrian Army's 2nd Corps.

== Role ==
Syrians used the term "Special Forces" to describe the 14th, 15th divisions, as well as the independent 'special forces' regiments, but they more closely resembled conventional light infantry units than Western Special Forces in both mission and composition.

The term "Special Forces" was applied ostensibly because of their specialized training in airborne and air assault operations, but they were regarded as light infantry forces and elite only in relation to the conventional armored and mechanized brigades of the Syrian Army.

== Command structure ==
14th Special Forces Division (2019)

- 36th Special Forces Regiment
- 554th Special Forces Regiment
- 556th Special Forces Regiment

== Combat history ==
The 14th Special Forces Division was established to command three Special Forces Regiments after the mid 1990s restructuring of Ali Haydar’s consolidated Special Forces Command.

Haydar's Special Forces expanded in size to 25,000 men, and formed a key part of the Syrian government's security apparatus. The Special Forces were trained in airborne operations, and were rivaled on power only by the Defense Companies controlled by Hafez's brother, Rifaat. As such, the 14th Division became a strong counter-weight to the Defense Companies, as both these formations were largely airborne divisions.

New members were traditionally recruited from the Alawite sect to ensure loyalty to the government. Intelligence sources state it is likely that such units were involved in crushing popular dissent and neutralizing ringleaders.

=== Syrian intervention in Lebanon ===
Under the command of Ali Haidar, the Special Forces units were deployed to Lebanon as part of the Syrian intervention in the Lebanese Civil War. It provided support to Kamal Jumblatt and in some cases cooperating with the Lebanese National Movement and Lebanese National Resistance Front. During the war they engaged with PLO units under the command of Yasser Arafat.

=== Syrian Civil War ===
The government committed much of the 14th Special Forces Division to the assault of Homs, in which it fought some of the strongest rebel positions of Homs’ southwest Baba Amr, Inshaat, and Jobar neighborhoods.

Opposition reports specifically cited activity from the 556th Special Forces Regiment, but most frequently cited the 14th Special Forces Division generally. Activity was reported in different parts of the city during similar time-frames, suggesting that at least one additional regiment from the 14th Special Forces was involved in the operation of recapturing Homs.

Since 2019, it was reorganized and rebuild with new graduates of the military academies. The old battalions and brigades were destroyed, and had to be rebuilt from scratch.

== See also ==
- 15th Special Forces Division
- 25th Special Mission Forces Division
- 4th Armored Division
- Republican Guard
- List of paratrooper forces
- List of military special forces units
