= Zubaida al-Meeki =

- Born: Syrian Golan, Syria
- Military career
- Allegiance: Ba'athist Syria (previously); Syrian opposition (2012)
- Branch: Free Syrian Army
- Rank: Colonel
- Commands: Recruitment division in Babbila
- Conflicts: Syrian civil war

Zubaida al-Meeki (Arabic: زبيدة الميقي) is an Alawite Free Syrian Army colonel, who defected from the Syrian Army to the FSA in 2012 during clashes in the town of Babbila. She became the first female officer to publicly announce her defection from the Army. Before her defection, she worked in the army's recruitment division in Babbila. After her defection, she stayed in Syria for two months where she trained 40-50 fighters of the Soldiers of God Battalion, before fleeing to Turkey.
