= Rif Dimashq Governorate campaign =

Campaign of the Syrian civil war

- Part of Syrian Civil War
Date	3 November 2011 – 8 December 2024 (13 years, 1 month and 5 days)
Location	Rif Dimashq and Damascus Governorates, Syria
Result	Syrian opposition victory: Fall of the Assad regime; Syrian Salvation Government managed to capture Rif Dimashq and Damascus
Territorial changes	Syrian Opposition managed to capture all part of Rif Dimashq and Damascus

Belligerents
(Syria) Syrian Arab Republic (surrendered) (until 2024); Iran (2013–2024); Russia (2015–2024); Palestine Liberation Army; PFLP–GC; Fatah al-Intifada; Hezbollah; Arab Nationalist Guard; SSNP; LAAG (from 2013)	Syrian Salvation Government (Syrian opposition) Syrian Interim Government Southern Operations Room (Syria) Free Syrian Army; Al-Nusra Front; Ahrar ash-Sham; Jaysh al-Islam	Islamic State (IS) (surrendered)

Part of the Syrian Civil War, the Rif Dimashq Governorate campaign consisted of several battles and offensives across the governorate including the Syrian capital of Damascus:

== Offensives ==
- Rif Dimashq clashes (November 2011–March 2012): Damascus centre under government control, protests largely suppressed in the city.
- Battle of Damascus (2012): rebels first infiltration of Damascus from the surrounding countryside.
- Rif Dimashq offensive (August–October 2012): Syrian Army seizes more than half a dozen rebel-held towns north, west and south of Damascus, rebels retain control of the Ghouta area, east of Damascus.
- Rif Dimashq offensive (November 2012–February 2013): Free Syrian Army takes control of Darayya, Zamalka, Harasta and Arbin, offensive stalls in early January 2013, due to continuing air-strikes. Army launches a major offensive on rebel-held Darayya in mid-January.
- Siege of Darayya and Muadamiyat (November 2012–October 2016): rebels surrender Darayya as well as Mudamiyat al-Sham to the government and leave both towns.
- Damascus offensive (6 February – 25 March 2013): rebel operations around Damascus city ring.
- Siege of Eastern Ghouta (May 2013 – April 2018): The Syrian Army captures Eastern Ghouta.
- Rif Dimashq offensive (March–August 2013): Syrian Army captures the towns of Jdaidet al-Fadl, Jdeidit Artouz, Otaiba, Qaysa, Jarba, Harran Al-Awamid and Abadeh cutting the main rebel supply line into Damascus. Syrian Army surrounds the rebel-held Eastern Ghouta area, surrounds and partially advances into the rebel-held Qaboun, Barzeh and Jobar suburbs.
- Rif Dimashq offensive (September–November 2013): Syrian Army captures the towns of Shaba’a, Sheikh Omar, al-Thiabiya, Husseiniya, Bweida, Hatetat al-Turkman, Al-Sabinah.
- Battle of Qalamoun (2013–2014): Syrian Army takes almost full control of the Qalamoun Mountains border region, including the An-Nabek District and Yabroud District
- Battle of Al-Malihah: Syrian Army captures Al-Maliha after a four-month battle.
- Qalamoun offensive (2014): Hezbollah captures all hills around rebel hideouts on both sides of the Lebanon–Syria border.
- Rif Dimashq offensive (August–November 2014): Syrian Army captures Heteta al-Jersh and Adra and recaptures al-Dukhaniyya and Kabbasa.
- Battle of Yarmouk Camp (2015): the Islamic State of Iraq and the Levant (ISIS or ISIL) invades Yarmouk Camp, with aid from al-Nusra Front, and manages to capture 95% of the camp on 7 April, before Syrian rebel groups and the Syrian Army launch a counterattack on 12 April to drive ISIL and al-Nusra Front out of the area.
- Qalamoun offensive (May–June 2015): Army captures most of the mountainous border region
- Rif Dimashq offensive (September 2015): limited rebel gains.
- Al-Dumayr offensive (April 2016): Syrian Army repels ISIL's offensive.
- East Ghouta inter-rebel conflict (April–May 2016): rebel infighting between Jaish al-Fustat and Jaysh al-Islam.
- Rif Dimashq offensive (April–May 2016): Army territorial gains in rebel strongholds of Deir al-Asafir and Zabdin.
- Rif Dimashq offensive (June–October 2016): Large Army gains in the northeastern section of Eastern Ghouta.
- Eastern Qalamoun offensive (September–October 2016): Indecisive.
- Khan al-Shih offensive (October–November 2016): Army captures the Khan al-Shih rebel pocket of Western Ghouta.
- Wadi Barada offensive (2016–17): Army captures Wadi Barada after a three-year siege.
- Qaboun offensive (2017): Army captures the Qaboun, Barzeh and Tishrin neighborhoods of Damascus.
- East Ghouta inter-rebel conflict (April–May 2017): Indecisive.
- Syrian Desert campaign (May–July 2017): Syrian Army and allies victory.
- 2017 Jobar offensive: Syrian Army offensive stalled; Army advance on Jobar repelled by rebels.
- Qalamoun offensive (2017): Syrian Army and allies gain full control of the Lebanon–Syria border.
- Beit Jinn offensive: Syrian forces regain control of Beit Jinn.
- Battle of Harasta (2017–18): Indecisive.
- Southern Damascus offensive (January - February 2018): ISIS seize 90% of Yarmouk.
- Rif Dimashq offensive (February–April 2018): decisive Syrian Army and allies Victory. Syrian government takes control over the Eastern Ghouta.
- 2nd Southern Damascus offensive (March 2018): ISIL victory.
- Eastern Qalamoun offensive (April 2018): Syrian Army and allies victory.
- 3rd Southern Damascus offensive (April–May 2018): Syrian Army and allies victory. Syrian government regains control over the whole Rif Dimashq and Damascus Governorates.
- Fall of Damascus (2024): Syrian opposition forces entered the Rif Dimashq region from the south and east, and came within 20 kilometres (12 mi) of the capital Damascus, before quickly surrounding and capturing the capital city. Concurrently, with the advance towards Damascus, opposition forces in the north launched an offensive into Homs city.

Resume of Battles/Offensives from Rif Dimashq Governorate Campaign
Battle	Timespan	Government	Opposition
1st Rif Dimashq	3 November 2011 – March 2012	800 killed	1,000 killed
1st Damascus	15 July – 4 August 2012	97 killed	300 killed
2nd Rif Dimashq	15 August – 7 October 2012	Unknown	1,500 killed
3rd Rif Dimashq	7 November 2012 – 5 February 2013	690 killed	1,040 killed
2nd Damascus	6 February – 25 March 2013	440 killed	735 killed
4th Rif Dimashq	26 March – 22 August 2013	1,150 killed	2,125 killed
5th Rif Dimashq	10 September – 28 November 2013	115 killed	1,000 killed
6th Rif Dimashq	August – November 2014	175 killed	678 killed
7th Rif Dimashq	11 – 27 September 2015	41 killed	170 killed
8th Rif Dimashq	25 April – 19 May 2016	Unknown	Unknown
9th Rif Dimashq	21 June – 30 October 2016	Unknown	Unknown
10th Rif Dimashq	18 February – 14 April 2018	520 killed	405 killed
Total Casualties	3 November 2011 – 21 May 2018	At least 4,018 killed	8,953 killed
