= National Defence Forces =

Reserve force of Ba'athist Syria's military

National Defense Forces
- قوات الدفاع الوطني
- Symbol of the NDF
- Active: 1 November 2012 – 8 December 2024
- Disbanded: 2024
- Country: Ba'athist Syria
- Allegiance: (Ba'athist Syria) Bashar al-Assad
- Type: Paramilitary; Auxiliary force Militia
- Role: Reserve army Counter-insurgency; Light infantry
- Size: 50,000 (2023)
- Part of: Syrian Arab Armed Forces (Ba'athist Syria) (surrendered)
- Garrison/HQ: 3002 Damascus, Syria (main HQ); With elements in: Aleppo Governorate; Hama Governorate; Latakia Governorate; Tartus Governorate; Homs Governorate al-Hasakah Governorate; Damascus Governorate; As-Suwayda Governorate; Deir ez-Zor Governorate
- Equipment: See List of NDF equipment
- Engagements: Iran–Israel proxy conflict; Syrian civil war: Damascus campaign; Siege of Darayya and Muadamiyat; Damascus offensive; Battle of Yarmouk Camp (2015); Qaboun offensive (2017); 2017 Jobar offensive; Battle of Harasta (2017–2018); Southern Damascus offensive (March 2018); Southern Damascus offensive (April–May 2018); Rif Dimashq Governorate campaign; 4th Rif Dimashq offensive; 5th Rif Dimashq offensive; 6th Rif Dimashq offensive; Rif Dimashq offensive (September 2015); Al-Dumayr offensive (April 2016); Homs campaign; Al-Qusayr offensive; Siege of Homs; Battle of al-Qaryatayn (2016); Palmyra campaign; Palmyra offensive (May 2015); Palmyra offensive (July–August 2015); Palmyra offensive (March 2016); Palmyra offensive (December 2016); Palmyra offensive (2017); Aleppo campaign; East Aleppo offensive (2015–16); Northern Aleppo offensive (February 2016); 2016 Southern Aleppo campaign; Aleppo offensive (June–July 2016); Aleppo offensive (July–August 2016); Aleppo offensive (August–September 2016); Aleppo offensive (September–October 2016); Aleppo offensive (October–November 2016); Latakia campaign; 2013 Latakia offensive; 2014 Latakia offensive; 2015–16 Latakia offensive; 2016 Latakia offensive; Qalamoun campaign; 1st Qalamoun offensive; 2nd Qalamoun offensive; Daraa campaign; Daraa offensive (February–May 2014); Battle of Al-Shaykh Maskin (2015–2016); Daraa and As-Suwayda offensive (June 2015); Hama campaign; 2013 Hama offensive; 2014 Hama offensive; 2016 Hama offensive; Hama offensive (March–April 2017); Quneitra campaign; Quneitra Governorate clashes (2012–14); Quneitra offensive (June 2015); Quneitra offensive (September 2016); 2014 Quneitra offensive; Quneitra offensive (October 2015); Raqqa campaign; Raqqa campaign (2012–2013); Ithriyah-Raqqa offensive (February–March 2016); Ithriyah-Raqqa offensive (June 2016); Deir ez-Zor campaign; Deir ez-Zor clashes; Deir ez-Zor offensive (January 2016); Deir ez-Zor offensive (January 2017); 2014 Eastern Syria offensive; Hasakah campaign; Al-Hasakah Governorate campaign (2012–2014); Battle of Qamishli (April 2016); Battle of al-Hasakah (2016); Northwestern Syria campaign; Northwestern Syria campaign (October 2017–February 2018); Operation Olive Branch; Afrin offensive (January–March 2018); Northwestern Syria offensive (April–August 2019); Northwestern Syria offensive (December 2019–March 2020); Northwestern Syria clashes (December 2022–November 2024); 2024 Syrian opposition offensives; Fall of Damascus (surrendered); Middle Eastern crisis (2023–present); Attacks on US bases during the Gaza war

Commanders
- President of Syria: Marshal Bashar al-Assad
- Minister of Defense: Gen. Ali Mahmoud Abbas
- Chief of the General Staff: Gen. Abdul Karim Mahmoud Ibrahim
- Final Commander: Brig. Gen. Hawash Mohammed

Insignia
- Identification symbol

National Defense Forces
- Quwāt ad-Difāʿ al-Watanī
- Dates active: 1 November 2012 – 8 December 2024
- Groups: Golan Regiment (disbanded in 2019); Fist Battalion; Second Battalion; Third Battalion; Quneitra Hawks Brigade (disbanded in 2018); Al-Shaitat tribe militias
- Headquarters: Damascus
- Active regions: Syria
- Ideology: Neo-Ba'athism; Assadism
- Wars: the Syrian civil war

The National Defense Forces (NDF; Arabic: قوات الدفاع الوطني Quwāt ad-Difāʿ al-Watanī) was a Syrian paramilitary volunteer militia, that was formed on 1 November 2012 and organized by Ba'athist Syria during the Syrian civil war as a part-time volunteer reserve component of the Syrian Arab Armed Forces.

The NDF was made up of units across various Syrian provinces, each consisting of local volunteers willing to fight against rebels for various reasons.

== Formation ==
By the beginning of 2013, the Syrian government took steps to formalize and professionalize hundreds of Popular Committee militias under a new group dubbed the National Defense Forces.

The goal was to form an effective, locally based, highly motivated force out of pro-government militias. The NDF, in contrast with the Shabiha forces, received salaries and military equipment from the government. Since the formation of the NDF, Shabiha members have been incorporated into its structure. The National Coalition for Syrian Revolutionary and Opposition Forces has defined Shabiha as the Syrian National Defense Forces.

Young and unemployed men join the NDF, which some view as more attractive than the Syrian Arab Army, considered by many of them to be infiltrated by rebels, overstretched and underfunded. A number of recruits say they joined the group because members of their families had been killed by rebel groups. In some Alawite villages almost every military-age male has joined the National Defense Force.

In 2015, the Syrian government began arming some citizens of the eastern part of Al-Suwayda Governorate against the Syrian Al-Qaeda group Al-Nusra Front and the Islamic State of Iraq and the Levant (ISIL), who were harassing the local population with abductions, executions, and plundering, while using the region as a battlefield. However, the Druze of Suwayda do not represent a significant contingent within the NDF, most of the Druze within the NDF being recruited by the Golan Regiment among the residents of the Golan Heights, Quneitra Governorate, following an agreement between rebels and pro-Assad local fighters in 2013.

The creation of the NDF was personally overseen by Iranian Quds Force commander Qasem Soleimani. Syrian security officials stated that they received assistance from Iran and Hezbollah, who both "played a key role in the formalization of the NDF along the model of the Iranian 'Basij' militia". The NDF recruits received training in urban guerilla warfare from Islamic Revolutionary Guard Corps (IRGC) and Hezbollah instructors at facilities inside Syria, Lebanon, and Iran, with this partnership remaining in place as of April 2015. Iran has contributed to gathering together existing neighborhood militias into a functioning hierarchy and provided them with better equipment and training. The United States government has also stated that Iran is helping build the group on the model of its own Basij militia, and that some members are being sent for training in Iran.

== Role ==
The force acts in an infantry role, directly fighting against rebels on the ground and running counter-insurgency operations in coordination with the Syrian Army, which provides them with logistical and artillery support.

The force was reported to be 60,000-strong as of June 2013 and grew to 100,000 by August. The NDF is composed mainly of members of the Alawite and Shia sects of Islam and are loyal to the Syrian Government and the Syrian president Bashar al-Assad.

Units mostly operate in their local areas, although members can also choose to take part in army operations. Others have claimed that the NDF does most of the fighting because NDF members, as locals, have a strong knowledge of the region.

Struggling with reliability and issues with defections, officers of the Syrian Army increasingly prefer the part-time volunteer reserves of the NDF, who they regard as more motivated and loyal, over regular army conscripts to conduct infantry operations. An officer in Homs, who asked not to be identified, said the army was increasingly playing a logistical and directive role, while NDF fighters act as combatants on the ground.

On 20 February 2018, NDF battalions volunteered to support the Afrin canton against the Turkish-led operation against Afrin. More recently the NDF has been criticized for escalation and aggressiveness with the YPG and SDF in the cities of Qamishli and across the ANES Al-Hasakah, but mediation later ended the skirmishes.

An NDF militia from the Christian town of Mhardeh in Hama governorate, led by Sami Al-Wakil, has been accused of war crimes, through attacks on the neighboring Sunni towns of Halfaya in December 2012 and Kfar Hod in March 2013, and Al-Lataminah where it has been accused of being responsible for 200 civilian deaths in artillery fire from a hill it occupied, and of recruiting child soldiers. On the other hand, the town of Mhardeh was also the repeated target of mortar and artillery shelling from opposition factions which have killed almost 100 civilians by September 2018.

== Organization and training ==
According to a report, as of February 2015 the National Defense Forces are organized under provincial commanders, and loosely overseen by a national coordinator who is reported to be Brigadier-General Ghassan Nassour, although later sources report the name of Hawash Mohammed. Local branches are deemed to act with autonomy and to be not cohesive on the provincial level, although there is little uniformity.

Provincial branches seem to be commanded by a senior officer each.

The period of training can vary from 2 weeks to a month depending on whether an individual is being trained for basic combat, sniping, or intelligence.

According to a 2022 analysis by Carnegie Endowment for International Peace said "they are not experienced..., poorly equipped and have never excelled on the battlefield."

== Lionesses of National Defense ==
The NDF had a 500-strong women's wing called "Lionesses of National Defense", which operates checkpoints in the Homs area. The women are trained to use Kalashnikovs, heavy machine guns and grenades, and taught to storm and control checkpoints. The largest female group belong to Homs NDF. In January 2024, Lionesses of the NDF were disbanded.

== Funding ==
French far-right non-governmental organization SOS Chrétiens d'Orient (SOSCO) has conducted fundraising for the NDF according to an investigation by the Newlines Magazine.

== See also ==
- Iran–Syria relations
- List of armed groups in the Syrian Civil War
