= Arab Nationalist Guard =

Secular volunteer militia force in Syria

Arab Nationalist Guard الحرس القومي العربي
- Arab National Guard emblem and flag
- Dates active: April 2013–?
- Headquarters: Sidon, Lebanon
- Active regions: Western Syria
- Ideology: Arab nationalism Pan-Arabism; Anti-Zionism; Nasserism; Anti-imperialism; Secularism
- Size: 1,000 (May 2014)
- Wars: the Syrian Civil War

The Arab Nationalist Guard (Arabic: الحرس القومي العربي) was a secular volunteer militia force operating in Syria. The group espouses an Arab nationalist ideology. The Arab Nationalist Guard's membership includes nationalists from a variety of Arab countries.

== History ==
Formed in April 2013 by pan-Arab volunteers to fight against "all Takfiri movements that aim to strike our unity and sow divisions between Arabs", the Arab Nationalist Guard bolstered the ranks of Bashar al-Assad's government amid the 2012–13 escalation of the Syrian Civil War. The group quickly started to closely cooperate with the Syrian National Defence Forces militia network. From late 2013 to early 2014, the Arab Nationalist Guard primarily fought in the Rif Dimashq Governorate, though was also present at other conflict zones in Aleppo Governorate, Deraa Governorate, and Homs Governorate. It was prominently involved in government offensives in Qalamoun at the time.

By 2017, the unit had taken up positions in Deraa city. It later fought in the Siege of Eastern Ghouta. In 2020, the Israeli Shin Bet security service arrested members of a purported Popular Front for the Liberation of Palestine cell which had planned resistance attacks against Israeli targets and reportedly cooperated with the Arab Nationalist Guard and its civilian wing, the Arab Nationalist Youth. It was still operating in Damascus by early 2021.

== Ideology ==
The group's ideology falls in line with Gamal Abdel Nasser's pan-Arab ideals (Nasserism), as well as with anti-Zionism and anti-imperialism. It claims to oppose "sectarian, ethnic, or religious extremism", and also supports an independent State of Palestine. In its imagery and textual output, the militia has emphasized Nasser, Venezuelan President Hugo Chávez, Hezbollah, Iraqi President Saddam Hussein and Bashar al-Assad as praiseworthy examples.

== Organization ==
In its manifesto, the Arab Nationalist Guard stated that it included at least four units, namely the Wadie Haddad battalion, Haydar al-Amali battalion, Mohamed Brahmi battalion, and Jules Jammal battalion. The units' names are inspired by Arab politicians and martyrs who have led secularist and Arab national movements in the Middle East and North Africa region or were killed by Islamists. It has set up a camp in al-Malihah.

The militia is linked to the "Arab Nationalist Youth". The latter is active in Lebanon, the Gaza Strip, as well as Egypt, and has provided recruits from the Arab Nationalist Guard. The militia has recruited fighters from Syria, Egypt, Algeria, Libya, Iraq, Lebanon, Palestine, Tunisia, and Yemen. It has also recruited Syrian Palestinians. Some of their militiamen had fought previously in the Libyan Civil War and the Iraq War. Despite the militia's Arab nationalist ideology, one member stated that it also includes non-Arab fighters such as Kurds and Berbers, regarding all of them as part of the Ummah.

The Arab Nationalist Guard is supported by Hezbollah trainers, and has good connections with the wing of Hamas that does not support the Muslim Brotherhood.

== See also ==
- List of armed groups in the Syrian Civil War
