= Harasta =

Harasta حرستا
- Town
- Location in Syria
- Coordinates: 33°34′N 36°22′E
- Country: Syria
- Governorate: Rif Dimashq Governorate
- District: Duma District
- Subdisrict: Harasta
- Elevation: 702 m (2,303 ft)

Population (2007)
  - Total: 34,184
- Time zone: UTC+2 (EET)
  - Summer (DST): UTC+3 (EEST)
- Area codes: Country code: 963, City code: 11
- Climate: BSk

Harasta (Arabic: حرستا, romanized: Ḥarastā, Syriac: ܚܪܣܬܐ, romanized: Ḥarastā), also known as Harasta al-Basal or Hirista, is a town and northeastern suburb of Damascus, Rif Dimashq, Syria. Harasta has an altitude of 702 meters. It has a population of 34,184 as of 2007, making it the 43rd largest city per geographical entity in Syria.

== History ==
During the Syrian Civil War, it was one of the earliest rebel-held cities in Syria (see Battle of Douma and Rif Dimashq clashes (November 2011–March 2012)). Before the war, Harasta had been home to the 104th and 105th Republican Guard regiments and has a high population of Alawites in the suburbs, although it was a site of several anti-government protests in 2011. Harasta was reported under rebel control by early 2012. In March 2012 and again on 21 October 2012 it was reported that Harasta was under heavy government shelling. On 25 October, the Syrian army fired heavy tank and rocket barrages, after rebels overran two army checkpoints on the edge of the town. On 26 October 2012, it was shelled with heavy artillery, killing at least 10. On 30 October, government airstrikes targeted Harasta. It reported to be under regime control on 25 November 2012. In August 2013 it was reported under rebel control with government advances on key points in the town. Government control but rebel advances were reported in January 2014. It was reported targeted by chemical attacks in April 2014. Territory in Harasta changed hands repeatedly during the Rif Dimashq offensive (September 2015). It has been the site of fighting in the Battle of Harasta (2017–18).

On 23 March 2018, the Syrian army captured Harasta.

On 7 December 2024, Harasta was liberated by rebel forces.
