= Damascus Military Council =

Damascus Revolutionary Military Council
- المجلس العسكري الثوري بدمشق
- Leaders: Col. Khaled Mohammed al-Hammud (2012); Col. Abu al-Wafa (2013); Brig. Gen. Ziad Fahd (former); Ahmad al-Khatib (spokesman); Col. Zubaida al-Meeki (2012)
- Dates active: 22 March 2012 – late 2013/early 2014 (defunct)
- Groups: Sword of al-Sham Brigades; Levantine Jasmine Battalions; Mujahideen of al-Sham Brigade; Soldiers of God Battalions
- Active regions: Damascus Governorate; Rif Dimashq Governorate
- Ideology: Pluralism
- Part of: Free Syrian Army
- Wars: the Syrian civil war

The Damascus Revolutionary Military Council (Arabic: المجلس العسكري الثوري بدمشق), also called the Military Council of Damascus and its Suburbs (Arabic: المجلس العسكري في دمشق وريفها (Note: Not to be confused with another group formed in March 2015 with the same name under the Unified Military Command of Eastern Ghouta and affiliated with Jaysh al-Islam.)), was a Syrian rebel coalition affiliated with the Free Syrian Army created by Colonel Khaled Mohammed al-Hammud on 22 March 2012. It operated in the Damascus Governorate of Syria.

It claimed to be responsible for the suicide bombings at the General Staff Command of the Syrian Armed Forces in Damascus on 26 September 2012, but it is more likely that the al-Nusra Front was behind the attack.

It condemned Israel in a statement on 9 May 2013.

== See also ==
- List of armed groups in the Syrian Civil War
- Idlib Military Council
- Daraa Military Council
- Quneitra Military Council
