= 3rd Armoured Division (Syria) =

- الفرقة الثالثة المدرعة
- 3rd Armoured Division Flag
- Active: 1971–2024
- Country: Ba'athist Syria (surrendered)
- Branch: Syrian Arab Army (surrendered)
- Type: Armoured division
- Role: Armoured warfare
- Size: Up to 15,000 soldiers (2019)
- Part of: 3rd Corps (surrendered)
- Garrison/HQ: Al-Qutayfah; Douma (65th Brigade)
- Engagements: Yom Kippur War; Valley of Tears; Lebanese Civil War; Syrian occupation of Lebanon; 1982 Lebanon War; Battle of Sultan Yacoub; Islamist uprising in Syria; Siege of Aleppo; Hama Massacre; Syrian Civil War; Battle of Zabadani (2012); Siege of Daraa; Second Battle of Sha'ir; Battle of Damascus (2012); Rif Dimashq Governorate campaign; Qalamoun offensive (2017); Central Syria campaign; Battle of Harasta (2017–2018); As-Suwayda offensive (August–November 2018)

Commanders
- Final Commander: Maj. Gen. Mowaffaq Nazeer Haidar
- Chief of Staff: Brig. Gen. Thaer Ahmed Ajeeb
- Notable commanders: Lt. Gen. Shafiq Fayadh †; Gen. Ibrahim Al-Safi †; Brig. Gen. Akram Mualla †

The 3rd Armoured Division (Arabic: االفرقة الثالثة المدرعة) was a formation of the Syrian Army responsible for securing the northern approach to Damascus. The division was based in a military complex near Al-Qutayfah and has traditionally been seen as one of the Syrian Armed Force's most reliable conventional divisions. The division was part of the 3rd Corps.

== History ==
=== Yom Kippur War and Lebanon War ===
With the outbreak of the Yom Kippur War in October 1973, the division was held in reserve. The division, under the command of Lieutenant Colonel Mustafa Sharba, was an armored division consisting of T-62 tanks. On October 9, the division was put into battle and fought in the northern sector of the Golan Heights, including participating in the Battle in the Valley of Tears in an attempt to stop the Israeli attack on the Syrian Golan.

During the 1982 Lebanon War, the division's main role was to secure the anti-aircraft missile batteries in the north of the Lebanon Valley, but in the afternoon of 10 June it began In the movement south to reinforce the Syrian force in contact with the IDF, but did not enter to Lebanon before Friday morning. Hafez al-Assad decided to speed up the deployment of the 3rd Armored Division in the Beqaa Valley, and sent additional commando battalions to Lebanon. And an armored force of the division, which included T-72 tanks, ambushed the Israeli 409th Brigade on the morning of 11 June, and lost many tanks.

=== Islamic Uprising in Syria ===
The division, under General Shafiq Fayadh, played a key role in defeating the Muslim Brotherhood uprising in the 1980s. During the conflict the entire division was deployed to Aleppo in March 1980, and garrisoned the city for an entire year. Patrick Seale wrote on how the division had "a tank in almost every street.” Seale also wrote of an incident where General Fayadh stood on the turret of a tank and proclaimed that “he was prepared to kill a thousand men a day to rid the city of the vermin of the Muslim Brothers.”

The division was also used in the Government assault on Hama, with the division's 47th Armoured and 21st Mechanized Brigades providing the backbone of the assault. Muslim Brotherhood reports following the uprising suggested that three quarters of the officers, and a third of the soldiers of these brigades were Alawites.

=== 1984 coup attempt ===
The division, under Fayadh, also played a key role in blocking an attempted coup in 1984 by Rifaat al-Assad. The 3rd Division, along with Ali Haydar's Special Forces and the Republican Guard, engaged with Rifaat's Defence Companies in Damascus. While the Special Forces deployed anti-Tank platoons on the streets of Damascus to confront Rifaat's armoured columns and surrounded Rifaat's bases with snipers, Fayadh's armoured forces provided the armoured back-up and firepower to completely insulate Damascus from the outside, so that Defense Company units outside of Damascus ( in Lebanon and further north) could not come inside Damascus, and the 30,000 or so of Rifaat's forces within the environs of Damascus were effectively trapped.

=== Role in the civil war ===
In 2011, the division was under the command of Maj. Gen. Naim Jasem Suleiman. The 65th Brigade was under the command of Brig. Gen. Jihad Mohamed Sultan. Human Rights Watch accused the division of involvement in the suppression of protests at the beginning of the Syrian Civil War. Specifically, the division was alleged to have been involved in the violent suppression of protests in Douma and Daraa in April 2011. In Douma, the division was allegedly involved in arbitrary arrests, the looting of homes, and the shooting of unarmed protesters.

The 3rd Division played a central role in creating and supporting the pro-government Qalamoun Shield Forces, consisting of loyalist and reconciled rebels in the north Qalamoun area of Damascus in 2015. The division has been inactive since the mid-2018 offensives to clear the rebel pocket in East Ghouta, Damascus during the Rif Dimashq Governorate campaign and the ISIS pocket in north Suwayda. Since then, the bulk of the 3rd Division’s units have returned to their respective bases on the outskirts of Damascus. In December 2018, a process of rehabilitation and reorganization with Russian help began within the 3rd Armored Division. In 2019, Mowaffaq Nazeer Haidar was moved from divisional chief of staff to divisional commander as a major general.

By 2021, it was rebuilt with additional armoured and missile brigades (20th, 155th) and an artillery regiment (14th).

In 2021 the division comprised:

- Divisional commander and headquarters. Maj. Gen. Haidar was recently listed as the division's commander.
  - 20th Armoured Brigade
  - 65th Armoured Brigade
  - 81st Armoured Brigade
  - 21st Mechanized Brigade
  - 155th Missile Brigade
  - 14th Artillery Regiment
  - 67th Artillery Regiment

Mowaffaq Haidar was arrested by Syria's transitional government in June 2025.
