= List of settlements in Ghouta =

This is a list of towns and villages in the Ghouta region of Rif Dimashq.

== Eastern Ghouta ==
Markaz Rif Dimashq District

- Hizzah
- Saqba
- Hawsh al-Sultan
- Shabaa
- Zabdin
- Beit Sawa
- Sahba
- Saqba
- Zamalka
- Deir al-Asafir
- Al-Malihah
- Kafr Batna
- Jisrin
- Irbin
- Jaramana
- Ein Tarma
- Hamouriyah
- Harasta
- Beit Sahm
- Hutaytet al-Turkman

Douma District

- Dahiyat al-Assad
- Mesraba
- Madira
- Aqraba
- Douma
- Al-Bahariyah
- Otaybah

== Western Ghouta ==
Damascus Governorate (No longer considered as parts of Ghouta, rather as districts of Damascus)

- Mazzeh
- Kafr Souseh
- Dummar

Markaz Rif Dimashq

- Babbila
- Deir Ali
- Al-Sabinah
- Sayyidah Zaynab

Darayya District

- Ashrafiyat Sahnaya
- Darayya
- Muadamiyat al-Sham
- Sahnaya

Qudsaya District

- Al-Hamah
