= Siege of Eastern Ghouta =

2013–2018 Syrian siege east of Damascus

- Part of the Rif Dimashq Governorate campaign, and the Syrian civil war
- Map of the Eastern Ghouta enclave in 2017 Syrian Government control Opposition control
| Date | 7 April 2013 – 14 April 2018 (5 years and 1 week) |
| Location | Eastern Ghouta, Rif Dimashq Governorate, Syria |
| Result | Syrian Army and allies victory: Ghouta chemical attack; Douma chemical attack; 2018 missile strikes against Syria |
| Territorial changes | Syrian Army captures the rebel-held Eastern Ghouta pocket |

Belligerents
| Jaysh al-Islam (surrendered); Free Syrian Army (surrendered); Ahrar al-Sham (surrendered); Hay'at Tahrir al-Sham (surrendered); Jaysh al-Ummah (surrendered) (2014–15) | (Syria) Syrian Government; Iran; Russia (since 2015); Allied militias: Hezbollah; Palestinian Syrian militias LAAG; Arab Nationalist Guard; Liwa Fatemiyoun; Lions of Hussein | Islamic State of Iraq and the Levant (2013 – July 2014): Ansar al-Sharia (Allegedly, by al-Nusra) |

Commanders and leaders
| Zahran Alloush †; Essam al-Buwaydhani (surrendered); Abdul al-Nasr Shamir (surrendered) | (Syria) Ghiath Dalla (Syria) Suhayl al-Hasan | Unknown |

Units involved
| Jaysh al-Islam; Military Council of Damascus and its Suburbs; Free Syrian Army; Al-Rahman Legion; Al-Bara Brigade; Glory Brigades; Abu Musa al-Shari Brigade; Ajnad al-Sham Islamic Union (Eastern Ghouta branch, independent prior to 2016); Al-Habib al-Mustafa Brigade; 101st Battalion; Ahrar al-Sham; Fajr al-Umma Brigade (independent group prior to 2017) | Syrian Armed Forces; Syrian Army; Republican Guard; 4th Armoured Division; 42nd Armored Brigade; 25th Special Mission Forces Division; 14th Special Forces Division; 1st Corps; 7th Mechanized Division; 9th Armoured Division; 2nd Corps; 10th Mechanized Division; 62nd Mechanized Brigade; National Defence Forces; Syrian Air Force; Palestinian Syrian militias; Liwa al-Quds; PLA; PFLP-GC; Free Palestine Movement; PPSF-Majid; As-Sa'iqa; Fatah al-Intifada; Russian Armed Forces; Aerospace Forces | Unknown |

Strength
| 10,000 (in 2016); 20,000 (in 2018) | 15,000 (in 2018) | Unknown |

Casualties and losses
| 10,000+ killed (2012–18) | 10,000+ killed (2012–18) | Unknown |
- ~13,000 killed civilians (March 2011 to February 2018, per SNHR); ~30,000 killed overall (Eastern Ghouta hospital sources, 2017); 105,000–140,000 displaced (2018)

The siege of Eastern Ghouta was a siege that was laid by Syrian Government forces in April 2013, to the area in eastern Ghouta held by anti-government forces since November 2012, during the Syrian civil war. The cities and villages under siege were Douma, Mesraba, Arbin, Hamouria, Saqba, Modira, Eftreis, Jisrin, as well as suburbs of Damascus like Beit Sawa, Harasta, Zamalka, Ein Tarma, Hizzah and Kafr Batna. By 2016, around 400,000 people were trapped in an area just over 100 square kilometres in size, thus with a population density around 4,000 inhabitants/km^{2}.

United Nations Security Council Resolution 2401, adopted on February 28, 2018, called for a nationwide ceasefire in Syria for 30 days, including Eastern Ghouta, but the Syrian Army continued the offensive. In March 2018, the Syrian Army split the enclave into three parts, reaching an agreement with the rebels and their families to withdraw to the north, to Idlib. This action displaced 105,000 people from the area. Douma was the only city left by the end of that month that was not under Syrian government control.

On April 8, 2018, just over a year following sarin gas Khan Shaykhun chemical attack, an agreement had been reached to evacuate remaining fighters and civilians from the last rebel-controlled pocket of Douma following the chemical weapons attack that reportedly killed 70 people, and injured 500 who displayed symptoms of "toxic gas" exposure. The Syrian Government denied responsibility, together with its allies involved in the war: Russia and Iran. More than 50,000 people, including fighters from the Jaysh al-Islam and their families, have been evacuated out of the city as part of the deal, to northern Syria. Around 200 hostages loyal to the Syrian Government have reportedly been released by the rebels. Russian military police were deployed to Douma to enforce the agreement.

Thousands of people were killed during this 5-year siege period. Numerous allegations of war crimes and crimes against humanity were made during the siege, among others from the United Nations Human Rights Council, including the use of prohibited weapons, attacks on civilians, attacks against protected objects (schools, hospitals), starvation as a method of warfare and denial of medical evacuation.

== Background ==
Prior to the Syrian civil war, the total population of Eastern Ghouta, a collection of farms and cities near Damascus, was around 1.5 million people. During the civil unrest that began in Syria in March 2011, many of the eastern Ghouta residents took part in the protests against the Syrian president Bashar al-Assad and joined the Syrian rebels, who expelled Syrian government forces from much of Eastern Ghouta by November 2012. In February 2013, Syrian rebels captured parts of the ring road on the edge of Damascus and entered the Jobar district of the capital city. Backed by Iran and Hezbollah, the Syrian Arab Army counterattacked and in April 2013 began a siege of Eastern Ghouta, which is just 15 km or a half hour's drive outside the capital Damascus. Cut off from the rest of the country, the population of Eastern Ghouta resorted to incineration of plastics to generate electricity. In early 2015, when the Syrian government cut off water supplies to Douma, the population adapted yet again and dug over 600 underground wells, using manual pumps to supply water despite the famine.

== History ==
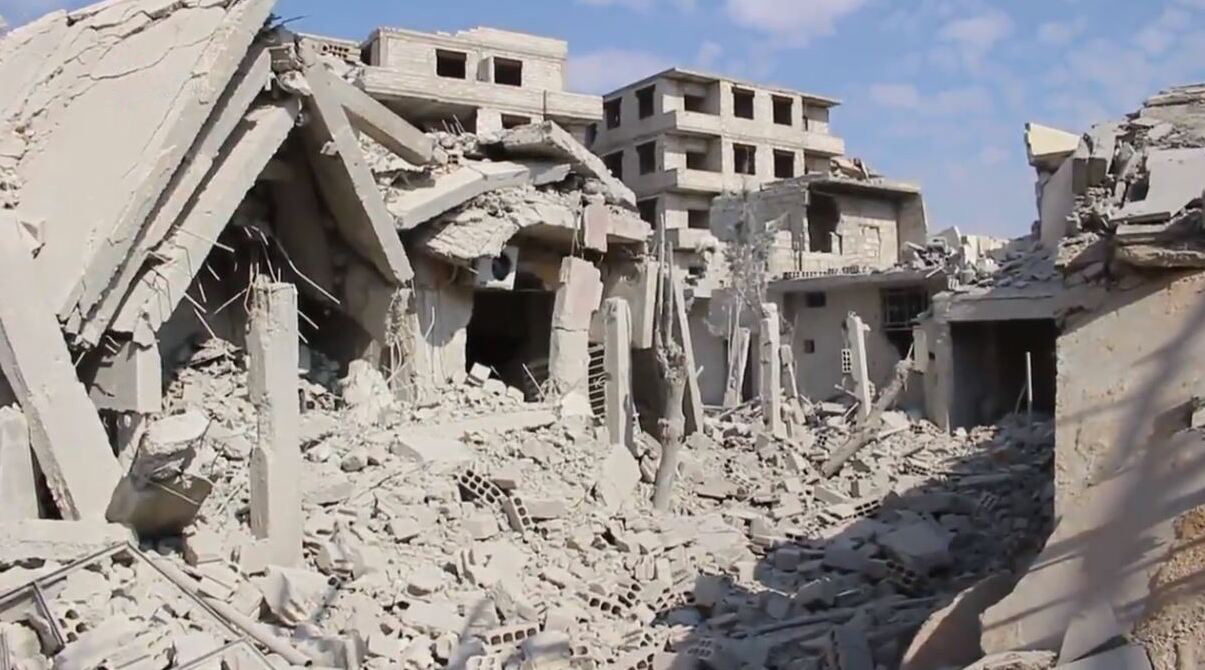
Area in Zamalka, 2018, destroyed by the bombardment

By mid-2017, the main rebel faction in the area was Jaysh al-Islam, based in Douma (with an estimated 10–15,000 fighters in the region in early 2018). The second largest was Faylaq al-Rahman, an official affiliate of the Free Syrian Army (FSA), controlling much of central and western parts of Ghouta, including the Jobar and Ain Terma districts. Ahrar al-Sham (based in Harasta) and Tahrir al-Sham (HTS – controlling smaller districts such as Arbin, al-Ashari and Beit Nayim, with an estimated strength in the area of 500 in February 2018) had a far smaller presence.

In August 2013, the area was subjected to the infamous Ghouta chemical attack that killed hundreds of people, an attack that was widely attributed by international organizations to government forces. After the attack, an agreement was reached between the United States and Russia, and Syria to remove chemical weapons from the Syrian military arsenal. From 14 to 30 November 2017, Russian and Syrian forces conducted more than 400 airstrikes in the region in its battle against the rebels, often hitting markets, schools and houses. Some of those airstrikes allegedly using banned cluster munition.

Despite efforts at turning Ghouta into a de-escalation zone, reports of bombs allegedly containing weaponised chlorine were registered again in early 2018. By January 2018, the area had only a single doctor per 3,600 people.

In April and May of 2016, the situation deteriorated further as rebels in Eastern Ghouta engaged in a violent conflict amongst themselves. The conflict pitted the Qatari-backed Al-Rahman legion, allied with Ahrar al-Sham and elements of Jabhat al-Nusra (Syria's main Al-Qaeda affiliate) against the more dominant Saudi-backed Jaysh al-Islam. Another inter-rebel conflict erupted in 2017 between Hay'at Tahrir al-Sham allied with the Al-Rahman legion against Jaysh al-Islam, with Ahrar al-Sham mostly staying on the sidelines. The conflicts underscored the lack of unity among rebel groups, with civilians caught in the crossfire, costing the factions much local support and helped hasten governmental victories against the rebel-held enclave.

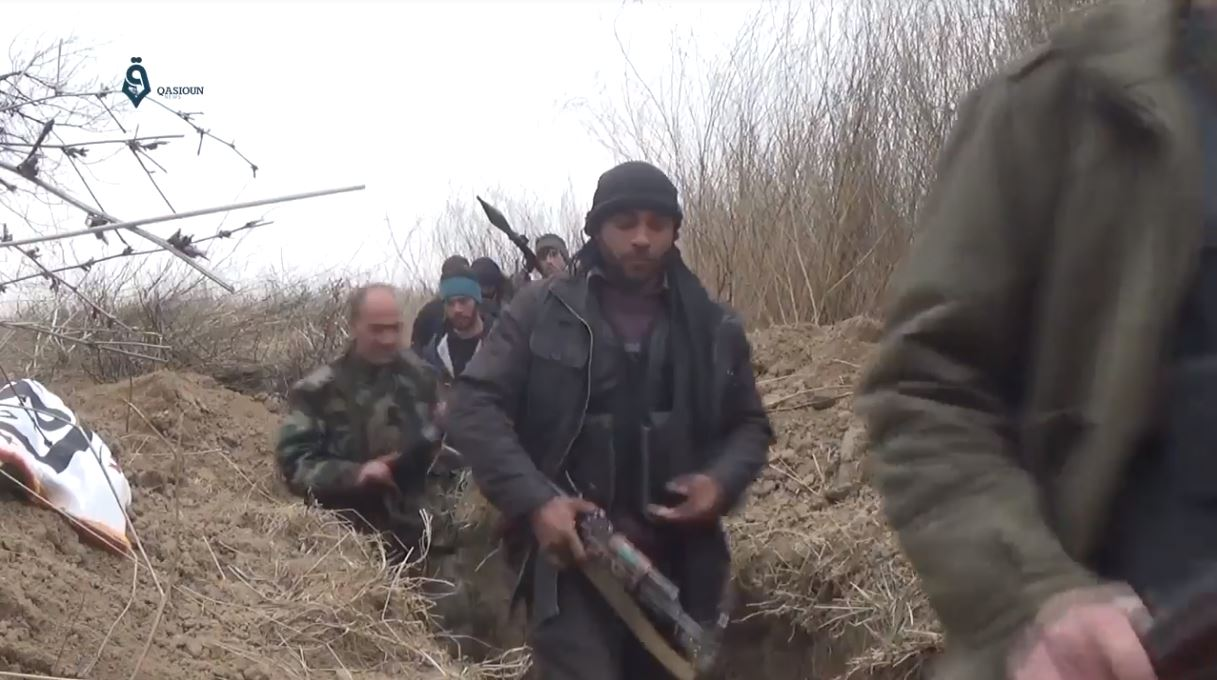
Jaysh al-Islam rebels in Eastern Ghouta in February 2017

After a series of offensive operations launched by Syrian rebels against positions of the Syrian Arab Army in Harasta, a northeastern suburb of Damascus, and other locations in Ghouta, the Syrian Arab Army launched an operation to capture the rebel-held part of Ghouta in February 2018. The escalation of hostilities led to a United Nations Security Council meeting held on 24 February 2018, voting unanimously in favor of a 30-day cease-fire in Syria, and demanded immediate lifting of the siege of eastern Ghouta. In March 2018 the government offensive continued, supported by Russia both diplomatically and militarily. On 11 March, the Syrian government took control over several areas and split the enclave into three pockets. These pockets included Douma and its northeastern outskirts, eastern Harasta, and Zamalka and surrounding area.

In mid-late March after a series of negotiations, a deal was finally reached between the Syrian government and rebels that controlled parts of Eastern Ghouta. The deal involved a transfer of remaining rebel fighters from the areas of eastern Harasta, Zamalka and surrounding areas to the province of Idlib. 105,000 people were displaced by this evacuation from the area. By the end of March, Douma was the last pocket East of Damascus controlled by the rebels, mostly Jaysh al-Islam fighters.

For at least 10 days, there were minimal attacks on the rebel pocket of Douma as talks with the Jaish al-Islam continued. It was reported later that the Jaish al-Islam shelled residential areas in Damascus, causing casualties and material damage. By 6 April, talks had "faltered" between the two sides and the Syrian Armed Forces (SAA) renewed their offensive in response to the attack. The Jaish al-Islam denied responsibility. The rebel group had also reportedly refused to release detainees loyal to the Syrian government it was holding in Douma. The shelling on 8 April 2018, which left several civilians dead, drew allegations of chemical weapons use in Douma, though the UN could not verify the claim initially.

== Casualties ==
In February 2018, the Syrian Network for Human Rights, a UK-based non-governmental organization, founded in June 2011, published a report alleging that 12,783 civilians were killed in and around Eastern Ghouta from March 2011 to February 2018, including 1,463 children and 1,127 women.

According to local hospital sources, which were cited in the French newspaper Le Monde, approximately 18,000 people were killed in the enclave by October 2017.

Médecins Sans Frontières claimed that 70 percent of the enclave's population lived underground by November 2017 to escape bombardments. It also registered that, on average, 71 people were being killed daily since the 18 February 2018 offensive. It registered 1,005 people killed and 4,829 wounded in two weeks alone, between 18 February and 3 March 2018.

== War crimes allegations ==
=== Government and allies ===
Numerous war crimes allegations were made during the battle, including the use of prohibited weapons, attacks on civilians, attacks against protected spaces (such as schools and hospitals), starvation as a method of warfare and denial of medical evacuation. The June 2018 UN inquiry concluded these amounted to crimes against humanity. The siege imposed by the Syrian government and its allies left the enclave under a humanitarian crisis, leading to famine and a lack of food. According to a 2014 UN report, the denial of food as a military strategy began during July and August 2013, when Eastern Ghouta's crops and farms were shelled and burned. The report also alleged that Syrian forces "blocked access roads and systematically confiscated food, fuel and medicine at checkpoints". Some inhabitants had to rely on tree leaves as an alternative for vegetables to survive. The rebels established a web of tunnels to smuggle supplies, but they were destroyed by the government forces.

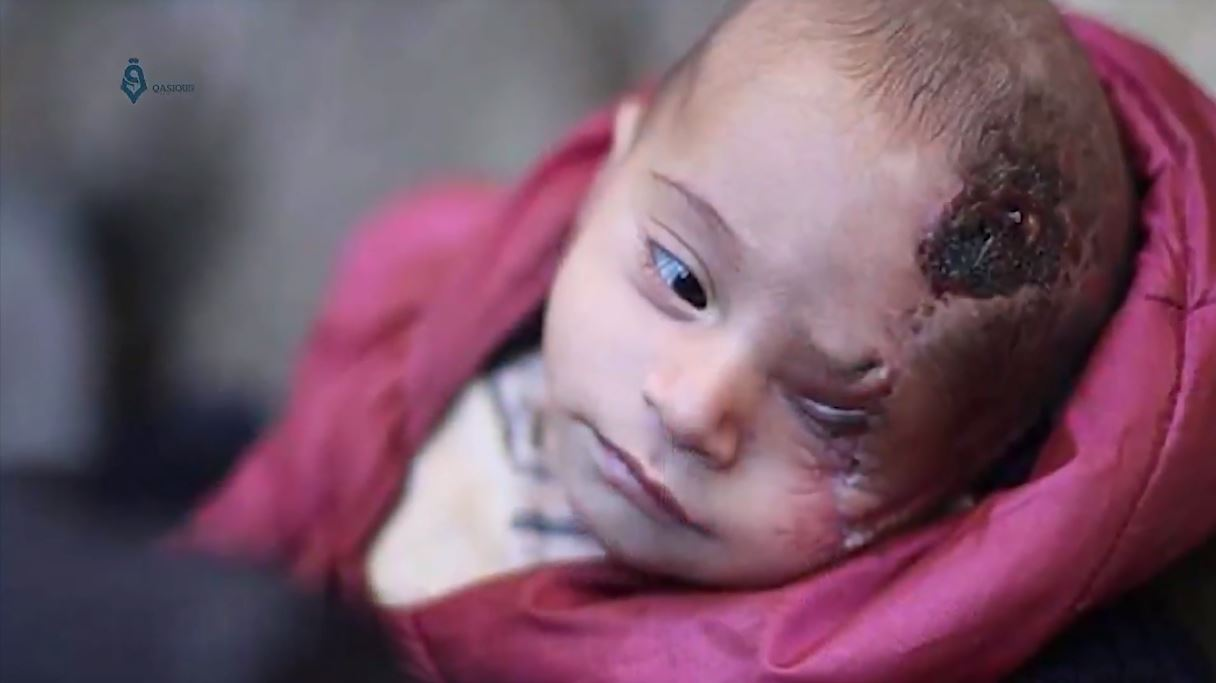
A child casualty on 29 October 2017

UNICEF Representatives said that at least 12% of children under 5 were acutely malnourished in the enclave in early 2018. On 27 October 2017, the United Nations High Commissioner for Human Rights, Zeid Ra'ad Al Hussein, warned that "the deliberate starvation of civilians as a method of warfare constitutes a clear violation of international humanitarian law" and called for access of humanitarian workers to deliver aid to the people of Eastern Ghouta. The Syrian government restricted humanitarian aid to the enclave. On 30 October 2017, supplies were allowed to only 40,000 residents in the two cities of Kafr Batna and Saqba. One U.N. aid convoy arrived to Eastern Ghouta in February 2018, only after it had no access for 78 days.

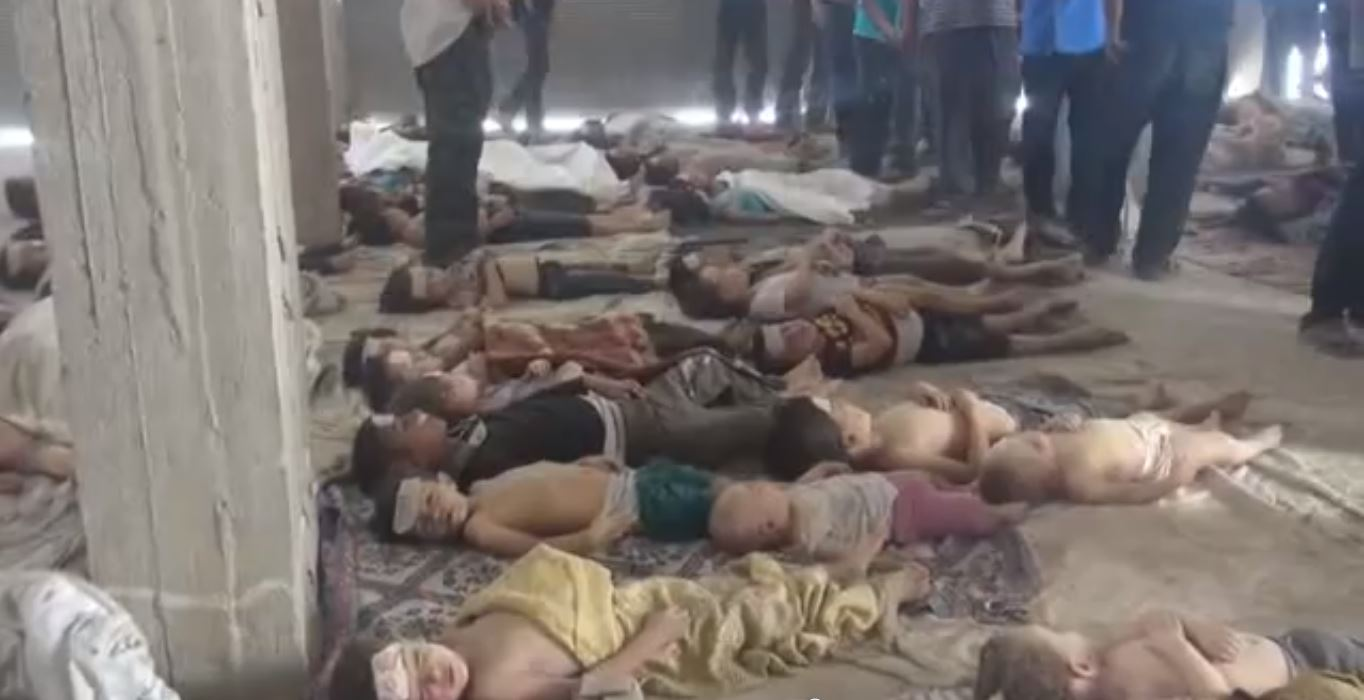
Corpses of the victims of the 2013 chemical attack

The Syrian government also used chemical weapons against the armed groups in Eastern Ghouta in July 2017, specifically in Ein Tarma (1 July), Zamalka (2 July) and Jobar (6 July), and on Harasta on 18 November 2017. The agents included chlorine gas and organophosphorous pesticide. The Syrian government also used internationally banned incendiary weapons. In one such incident reported on 16 March 2018, at 11:48am, these weapons were dropped on Kafr Batna, killing at least 61 and wounding over 200 people.

In December 2017, satellite imagery analysis by UN experts concluded that 3,853 buildings were destroyed, 5,141 severely damaged and 3,547 moderately damaged in the western parts of the enclave. The suburb of Jobar was 93% destroyed, Ein Tarma 73%, and Zamalka 59%. Hospitals in Eastern Ghouta were reported to have been shelled: Syrian army forces destroyed a field hospital in Al-Zemaniyah during a ground operation in July 2013, while shells landed near Al-Fatih hospital, where victims of the chemical attack were treated, forcing it to discharge its patients. Between 4 and 21 February 2018, the Syrian-Russian bombardments killed 346 people in Eastern Ghouta. Local counts reported 700 deaths in the three months up to mid-February 2018, many of them civilians. On 7 December 2017, the United Nations Senior Advisor Jan Egeland called east Ghouta the "epicenter of suffering".

After the end of the siege, tens of thousands of people have been unlawfully interned by the Syrian Government forces in rural Damascus, including Ghouta. Amnesty International has called the "unlawful siege and unlawful killing of civilians, including the use of internationally banned cluster munitions" by the Syrian government and Russia a war crime and a crime against humanity.

=== Rebel groups ===
The United Nations also found the four largest rebel factions that were active in eastern Ghouta, namely Jaysh al-Islam, the Al-Rahman Legion, Ahrar al-Sham and Tahrir al-Sham, guilty of crimes against humanity. They were known to arrest and torture members of religious minority groups, and indiscriminately fired mortars and rockets from eastern Ghouta at government-held areas. These attacks aimed at spreading terror, killing many civilians.

== Reactions ==
=== United Nations ===
2013: After the chemical weapons attack in the Ghouta area of Damascus, the UN sent an inspection team to begin an investigation. The final report concluded that evidence suggests that "surface-to-surface rockets containing the nerve agent sarin were used in Ein Tarma, Moadamiyah and Zamalka". The Russian government dismissed the initial UN report after it was released, calling it "one-sided" and "distorted".

2018: After the start of the renewed SAA offensive called "Rif Dimashq offensive" during mid-February, the UN proposed a 30-day ceasefire aimed at allowing aid deliveries to enter besieged areas, as well as medical evacuations. This ceasefire was "ignored" as the SAA continued its advances into the rebel-controlled areas. It was reported that in the following month, some 25 food trucks were allowed in. Some argued that this was simply not enough for the people living in war-torn areas.

=== USA, France, UK ===
The governments of the United States, United Kingdom and France accused the Syrian government of a chemical attack against the population of Douma in April 2018. As a consequence, the three states conducted a series of airstrikes targeting sites associated with Syria's chemical weapons capabilities in Damascus and Homs on 14 April 2018. The next day, Russia tried to pass a resolution condemning these US-UK-French airstrikes, but it was not adopted by the UN Security Council.

== Aftermath ==
On 27 November 2024, the Syrian opposition offensives started a campaign which led to the collapse of the Syrian government, thus overturning all Assad victories in the Siege of Eastern Ghouta.

== Gallery ==
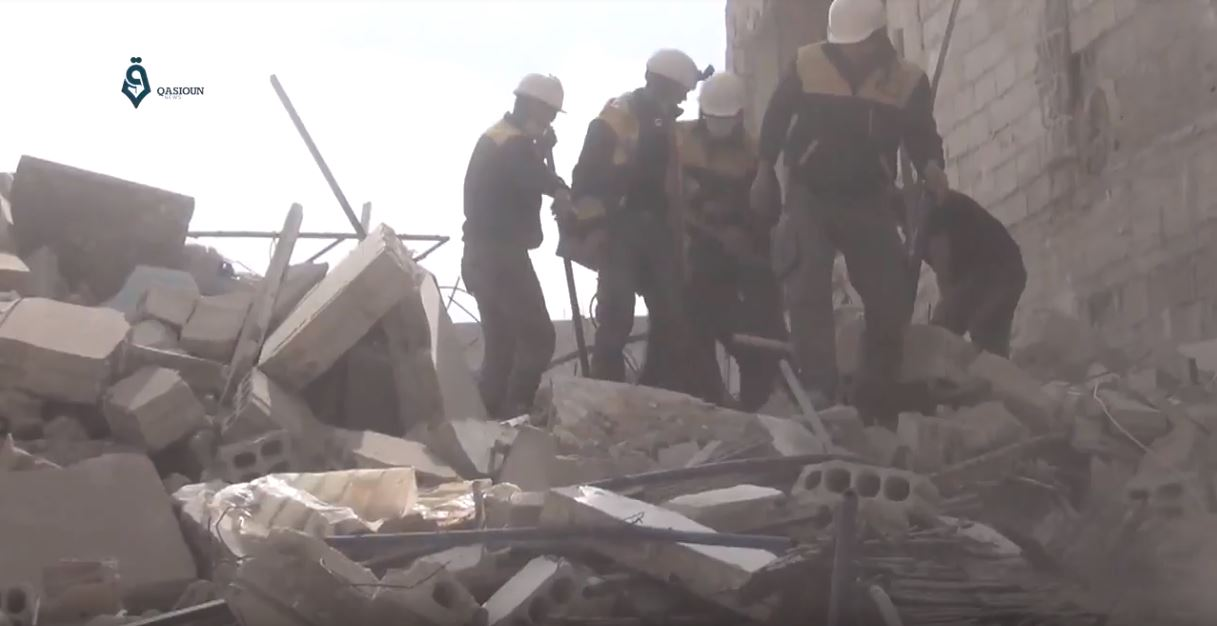
White Helmets looking for survivors in Arbin

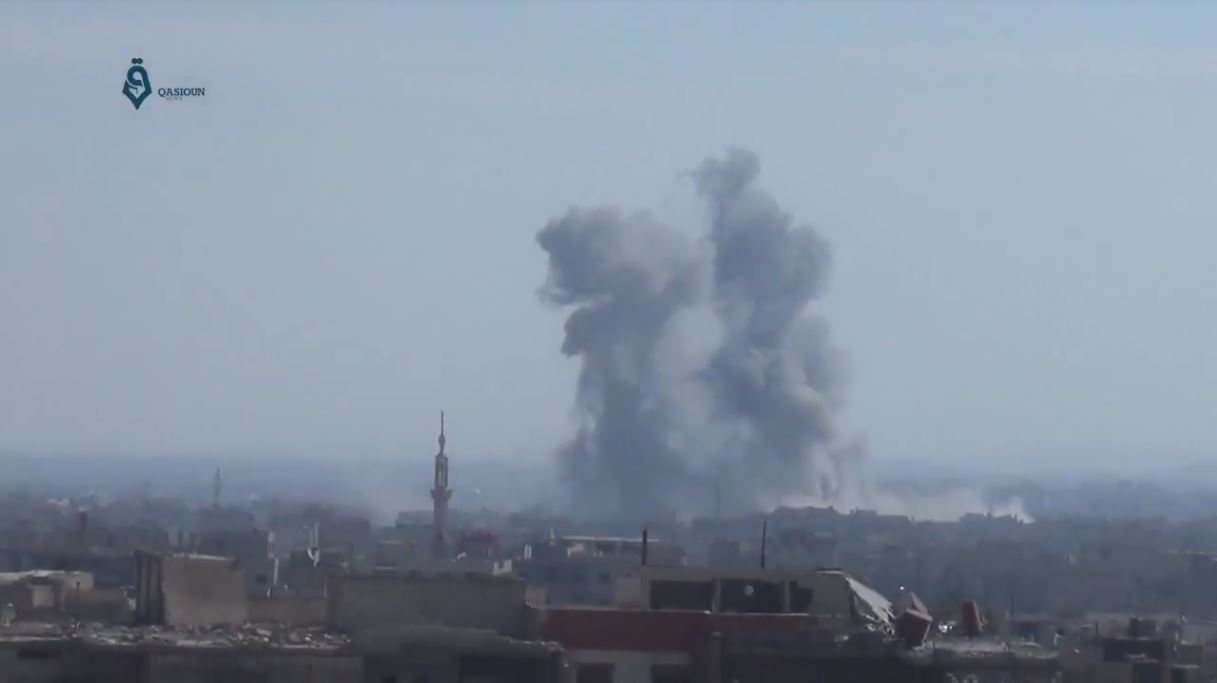
Aerial bombardments of East Ghouta in February 2018

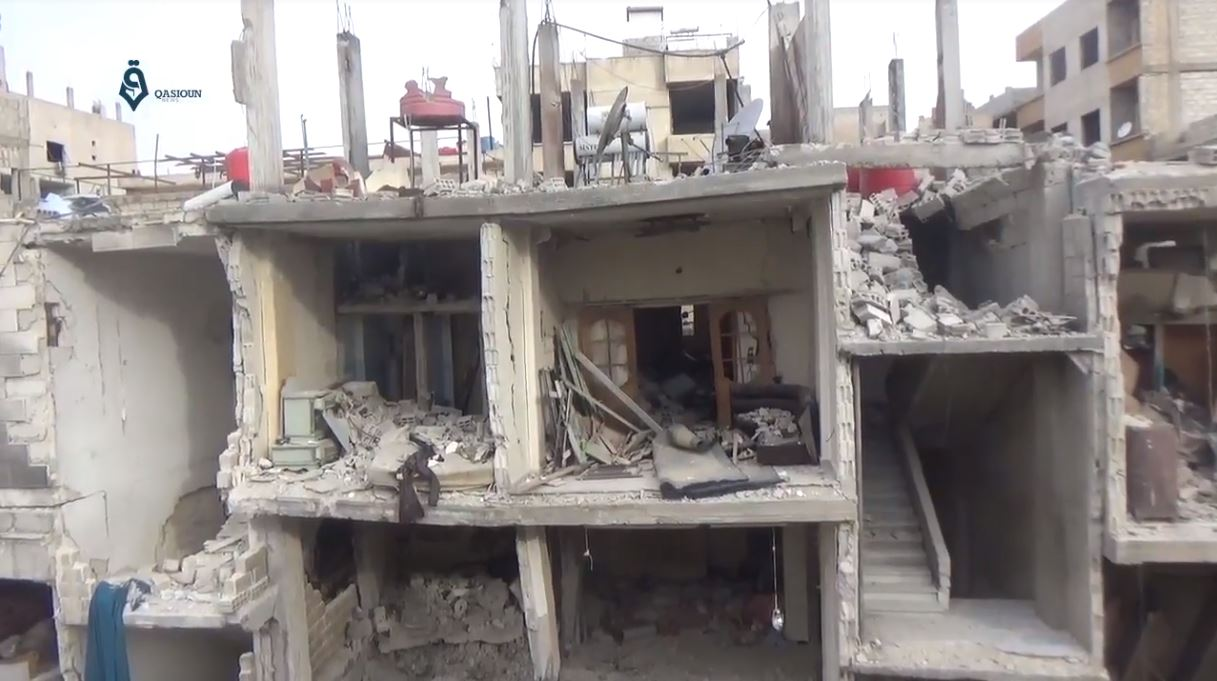
Ruins in Arbin on 27 February 2018

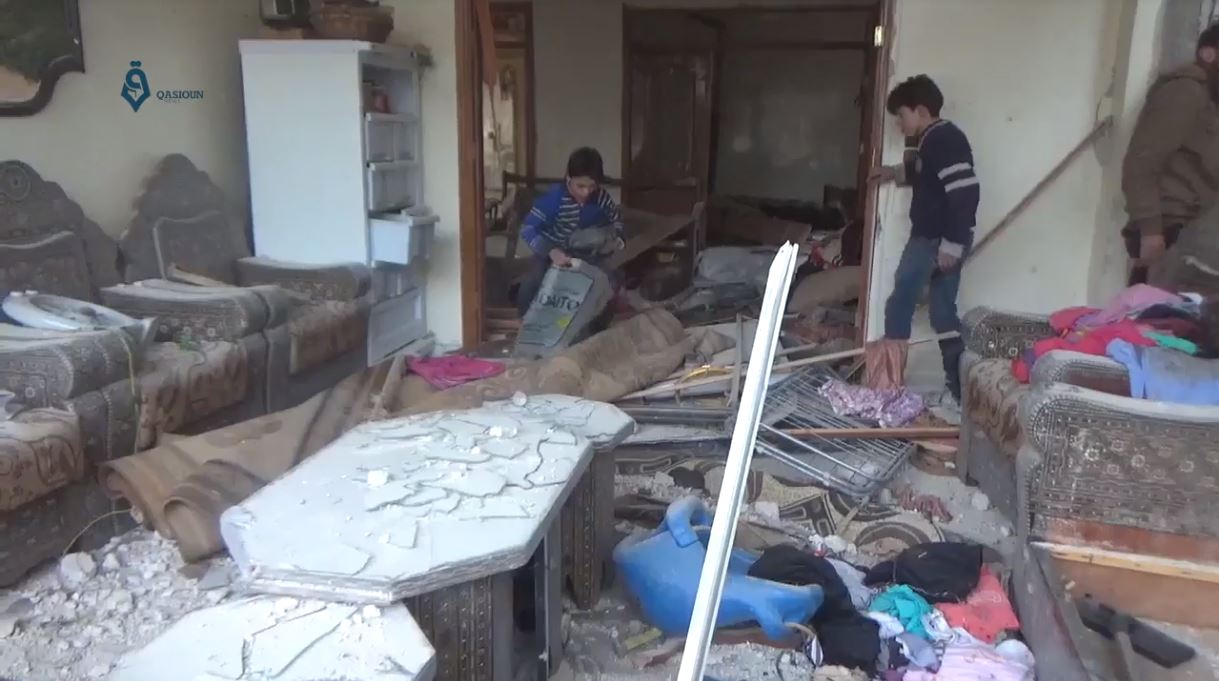
A family in Ghouta on 28 February 2018

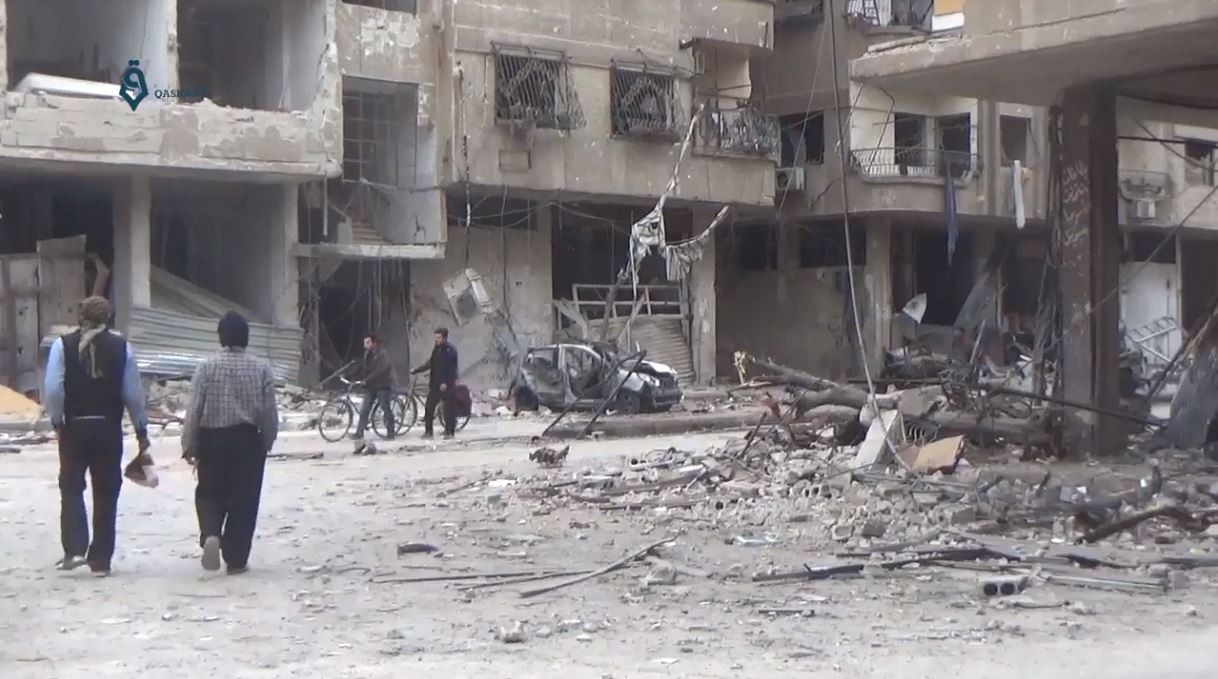
Streets of Arbin in 2018
