= UN investigation of chemical weapons use in Ghouta =

2013 UN report

Report on the Alleged Use of Chemical Weapons in the Ghouta Area of Damascus on 21 August 2013
- Author: United Nations Mission to Investigate Alleged Uses of Chemical Weapons in the Syrian Arab Republic
- Language: English
- Subject: Ghouta chemical attack
- Publisher: United Nations
- Publication date: 16 September 2013

The Report on the Alleged Use of Chemical Weapons in the Ghouta Area of Damascus on 21 August 2013 was a 2013 report produced by a team appointed by United Nations Secretary-General (UNSG) Ban Ki-moon to investigate alleged chemical weapon attacks during the Syrian civil war. The report published on 16 September 2013 focused on the 21 August 2013 Ghouta chemical attack, which took place whilst the Mission was in Damascus to investigate prior alleged incidents, including the Khan al-Assal chemical attack in March 2013.

== Background ==
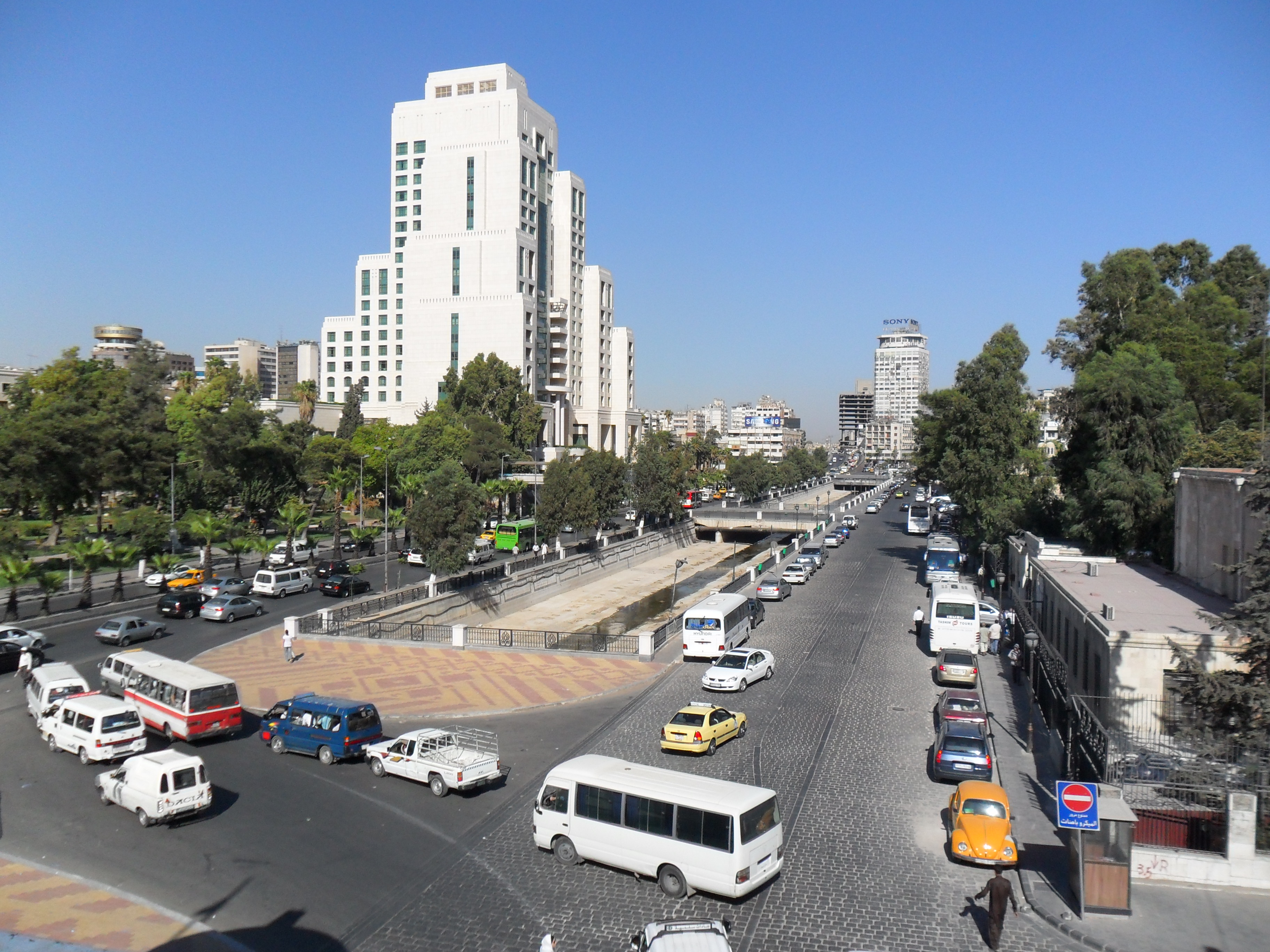
The Four Seasons Hotel Damascus, where the UN team stayed

Two days before the attack, a UN team headed by Åke Sellström arrived in Damascus with permission, from the Syrian government, to investigate earlier alleged chemical weapons use. On the day of the attack, UN Secretary General Ban Ki-moon expressed "the need to investigate [the Ghouta incident as] soon as possible," hoping for consent from the Syrian government. The next day, UN High Commissioner for Human Rights Navi Pillay urged government and opposition forces to allow investigation, and Ban requested the government provide immediate access. On 23 August, clashes between rebel and government forces continued in and around Ghouta, government shelling continued, and UN inspectors were denied access for a second day. United States officials told The Wall Street Journal that the White House "became convinced" that the Syrian government was trying to hide the evidence of chemical weapons use by shelling the sites and delaying their inspection. Ban called for a ceasefire to allow the inspectors to visit the attack sites. On 25 August the government agreed to cease hostilities with the presence of UN inspectors, and agreements between the UN, government and rebel factions were reached for five hours of cease-fire each day from 26 to 29 August.

== Investigation ==
Early in the morning of 26 August several mortars hit central Damascus, including one that fell near the Four Seasons hotel the UN inspectors were staying in. Later in the day the UN team came under sniper fire en route to Moadamiyah in western Ghouta (in the south of Damascus), forcing them to return to their hotel and replace one of their vehicles before continuing their investigation four hours later. The attack prompted Ban to declare he would register a complaint to the Syrian government and opposition authorities. After returning to Moadamiyah the team visited clinics and makeshift field hospitals, collected samples and conducted interviews with witnesses, survivors and doctors. The inspectors spoke with 20 victims of the attacks and took blood and hair samples, soil samples, and samples from domestic animals. As a result of the delay caused by the sniper attack, the team's time in Moadamiyah was substantially shortened, with the scheduled expiry of the daily cease-fire leaving them around 90 minutes on the ground.

On 28 and 29 August the UN team visited Zamalka and Ein Tarma in eastern Ghouta, in the east of Damascus, for a total time of five and a half hours. On 30 August the team visited at a Syrian government military hospital in Mazzeh, and collected samples.

== Report ==
The UN investigation into the chemical attacks in Ghouta was published on 16 September. The report stated that "the environmental, chemical and medical samples, we have collected, provide clear and convincing evidence that surface-to-surface rockets containing the nerve agent sarin were used in Ein Tarma, Moadamiyah and Zamalka in the Ghouta area of Damascus." The inspectors were able to identify several surface-to-surface rockets at the affected sites as 140mm BM-14 rockets originally manufactured in Russia and 330mm rockets probably manufactured in Syria. U.N. Secretary General Ban Ki-moon called the findings "beyond doubt and beyond the pale," and clear evidence of a war crime. "The results are overwhelming and indisputable ... A majority of the rockets or rocket fragments recovered were found to be carrying sarin." The report, which was "careful not to blame either side," said that during the mission's work in the rebel controlled Zamalka and Ein Tarma neighborhoods, "individuals arrived carrying other suspected munitions indicating that such potential evidence is being moved and possibly manipulated." The areas were under rebel control, but the report did not elaborate on who the individuals were. The UN investigators were accompanied by a rebel leader:

A leader of the local opposition forces [...] was identified and requested to take 'custody' of the Mission [...] to ensure the security and movement of the Mission, to facilitate the [sic] access to the most critical cases/witnesses to be interviewed and sampled by the Mission and to control patients and crowd in order for the Mission to focus on its main activities.

An August Scientific American article had described difficulties that could arise when attempting to identify the manufacturer of sarin from soil or tissue samples. UN lead investigator Sellström told the UN Security Council that the quality of the sarin was higher than that used by Iraq in the Iran–Iraq War and stating "In particular, the environmental, chemical and medical samples we have collected provide clear and convincing evidence that surface-to-surface rockets containing the nerve agent sarin were used," a conclusion omitted in the final report, implying a purity higher than the Iraqi chemical weapons program's 45–60%. (By comparison, Aum Shinrikyo used nearly pure sarin in the 1994 Matsumoto incident.) According to Human Rights Watch, hundreds of kilograms of sarin were used in the attack, which it said suggested government responsibility, as opposition forces were not known to possess significant amounts of sarin. The UN report states, "Chemical weapons use in such meteorological conditions maximizes their potential impact as the heavy gas can stay close to the ground and penetrate into lower levels of buildings and constructions where many people were seeking shelter."

=== Responses ===
The Russian government dismissed the initial UN report after it was released, calling it "one-sided" and "distorted". On 17 September, Russian Foreign Minister Sergei Lavrov reiterated his government's belief that the opposition carried out the attacks as a "provocation". The United Nations high representative for disarmament affairs, Angela Kane, stated that the inspection team would review Russia's objections.

A Russian defence expert Ruslan Pukhov, said that the code found by the UN investigators on the M-14 munition showed it had been produced in 1967 by the Sibselmash plant in Novosibirsk for a BM-14-17 multiple rocket launcher. He said that these weapons had been taken out of service by Syria and replaced with BM-21s. The second projectile identified by weapons inspectors, he thought, looked to be 'home-made'. An Iranian chemical weapons expert, Abbas Foroutan, said in October 2013 that the UN should publish more details about the investigation than were provided in the report, including victims' pulse rates and blood pressure and their response to the atropine treatment, the victims' levels of acetylcholinesterase (sarin is an acetylcholinesterase inhibitor), and more technical details on the lab testing process.

== Further developments ==
The UN inspection team returned to the Damascus area to continue investigations into other alleged chemical attacks in late September 13. A final report on Ghouta and six other alleged attacks (including three alleged to have occurred after the Ghouta attack) was released on 13 December 2013.

In the months immediately following the August attacks, and the situation they precipitated, "Syria declared to the OPCW 30 production, filling and storage facilities, eight mobile filling units and three chemical weapons-related facilities.They contained approximately 1,000 metric tons of chemical weapons, mostly in the form of raw precursors, 290 metric tons of loaded munitions and 1,230 unfilled munitions, OPCW documents showed."
