= Hizzah =

Hizzah حزة
- Village
- Location in Syria
- Coordinates: 33°22′7″N 36°22′59″E
- Country: Syria
- Governorate: Rif Dimashq
- District: Markaz Rif Dimashq District
- Subdistrict: Kafr Batna

Population (2004)
  - Total: 9,293
- Time zone: UTC+2 (EET)
  - Summer (DST): UTC+3 (EEST)

Hizzah (Arabic: حزّة) is a Syrian village located in Markaz Rif Dimashq District, Rif Dimashq. It is located in Eastern Ghouta. According to the Syria Central Bureau of Statistics (CBS), Hizzah had a population of 9,293 in the 2004 census. It is located in the Kafr Batna subdistrict. Its population is composed of Sunni Arabs. To its north are Zamalka, Irbin and Hamouriyah, to its east is Saqba, to its south is Kafr Batna and to its west is Ein Tarma.
