= Saqba =

Saqba سقبا Sakba
- Village
- Location within Syria
- Coordinates: 33°31′11″N 36°23′4″E
- Country: Syria
- Governorate: Rif Dimashq Governorate
- District: Markaz Rif Dimashq
- Nahiya: Kafr Batna
- Elevation: 650 m (2,130 ft)

Population (2004)
  - Total: 25,696
- Time zone: UTC+3 (EET)
  - Summer (DST): UTC+2 (EEST)

Saqba (Arabic: سقبا; also spelled Sakba or Siqba) is a town in southern Syria, administratively part of the Markaz Rif Dimashq District of the Rif Dimashq Governorate, 7 km east of central Damascus. Nearby localities include Jisrin to the southeast, Kafr Batna to the southwest, Hizzah to the southwest and Hamouriyah and Beit Sawa to the north. According to the Syria Central Bureau of Statistics (CBS), Saqba had a population of 25,696 in the 2004 census.

== History ==
Study and recitation of the Quran was held in the mosque of Saqba as early as the 12th century when its khatib was Ahmad ibn Hasan al-Kafatabi. Saqba was visited by Syrian geographer Yaqut al-Hamawi in the early 13th century, during Ayyubid rule. He noted that it was "a village of the Ghautah of Damascus."

=== Modern era ===
In the 1950s Saqba served as a village center of a district which contained seven other villages, with a total population of 12,000. Today, Saqba has become a working-class eastern suburb of Damascus.

=== Syrian Civil War ===
During the Syrian civil war, Saqba was under Free Syrian Army control since 2012, with splinter factions taking over eventually and would fall under siege by government forces from 2013 to 2018. The town was heavily damaged during the course of the war.

== Bibliography ==
- Money-Kyrle, A. F. (1956). Agricultural development and research in Syria. Faculty of Agricultural Sciences, American University of Beirut.
- Starr, Stephen (2012). Revolt in Syria: Eye-Witness to the Uprising. Columbia University Press. ISBN 978-0231704205.
- Strange, le, Guy (1890). Palestine Under the Moslems: A Description of Syria and the Holy Land from A.D. 650 to 1500. Committee of the Palestine Exploration Fund.
- Talmon-Heller, Daniella (2007). Islamic Piety in Medieval Syria: Mosques, Cemeteries and Sermons Under the Zangids and Ayyūbids. BRILL. ISBN 978-9004158092.
