= Moadamiyet al-Sham media centre =

- Country of origin: Syria
- Headquarters location: Muadamiyat al-Sham

Moadamiyet al-Sham media centre (Arabic: المركز الإعلامي معضمية الشام, also known as the Moadamiya media center) is a Syrian opposition-run media centre, operating from the town of Muadamiyat al-Sham located about 10 kilometers (6.2 mi) southwest of Damascus.

== Notable work ==
In August 2013, they documented the chemical attack on Western Ghouta and the following U.N. fact-finding missions activities in the area.
