= Ghouta chemical attack =

2013 gas attack during the Syrian Civil War

- Part of the siege of Eastern Ghouta
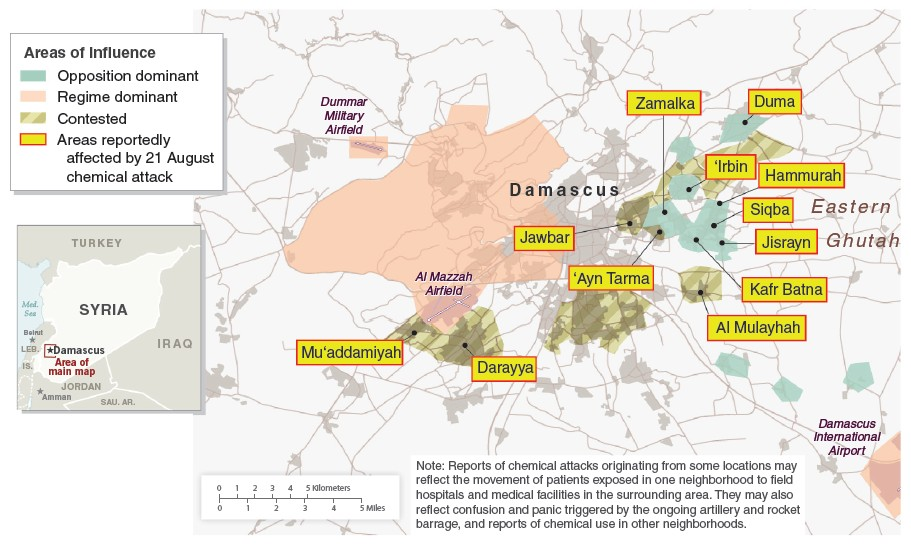
- Areas affected by the attack
- Location: Eastern Ghouta: 33.524°N 36.357°E; Western Ghouta: 33.460°N 36.197°E; Ghouta, Syria
- Date: 21 August 2013
- Attack type: Mass murder; chemical attack
- Weapon: Rockets filled with sarin
- Deaths: 281–1,729 killed (various estimates) (Note: at least 281 (French intelligence); at least 350 (UK intelligence); 355 (MSF); 494 (Damascus Media Office); 502 (SOHR); 635 (SRGC); 923 (VDC); 1,300 (SNC); 1,338 (LCC); 1,144 (SNHR); 1,429 (United States); 1,729 (FSA))
- Injuries: 3,600 patients displaying neurotoxic symptoms in 3 hospitals supported by MSF
- Perpetrators: Syrian Arab Republic (Note: See § Initial claims and § Russia for counter-claims by the Syrian and Russian governments, as well as other § Foreign government assessments): Syrian Arab Air Force
- Charges: Bashar and Maher al-Assad and two other Syrian senior government officials charged with complicity in crimes against humanity and complicity in war crimes
- Litigation: French arrest warrants for the Assad brothers and the two other officials

The Ghouta chemical attack was a chemical attack carried out by the forces of Syrian President Bashar al-Assad, in the early hours of 21 August 2013 in Ghouta, Syria, during the Syrian civil war. It was the deadliest use of chemical weapons in Syrian conflict and since the Iran–Iraq War. Two opposition-controlled areas in the suburbs around Damascus were struck by rockets containing the chemical agent sarin. Estimates of the death toll range from 281 to 1,729 people. The attack led to an international agreement to eliminate Syria's chemical weapons, but this was not completed and further chemical attacks occurred, including Khan Shaykhun in 2017 and Douma in 2018.

== Evidence of the attack ==
Inspectors from the United Nations Mission already in Syria to investigate an earlier alleged chemical weapons attack requested access to sites in Ghouta the day after the attack and called for a ceasefire to allow inspectors to visit the Ghouta sites. The Syrian Ba'athist government granted the UN's request on 25 August, and inspectors visited and investigated Moadamiyah in Western Ghouta the next day and Zamalka and Ein Tarma in Eastern Ghouta on 28 and 29 August.

The UN investigation team confirmed "clear and convincing evidence" of the use of sarin delivered by surface-to-surface rockets, and a 2014 report by the UN Human Rights Council found that "significant quantities of sarin were used in a well-planned indiscriminate attack targeting civilian-inhabited areas, causing mass casualties. The evidence available concerning the nature, quality and quantity of the agents used on 21 August indicated that the perpetrators likely had access to the chemical weapons stockpile of the Syrian military, as well as the expertise and equipment necessary to safely manipulate large amount of chemical agents." It also stated that the chemical agents used in the Khan al-Assal chemical attack earlier in 2013 "bore the same unique hallmarks as those used in Al-Ghouta".

The Syrian opposition as well as many governments, the Arab League and the European Union stated the attack was carried out by forces of Syrian President Bashar al-Assad. The Syrian and Russian governments blamed the opposition for the attack, the Russian government calling the attack a false flag operation by the opposition to draw foreign powers into the civil war on the rebels' side. Åke Sellström, the leader of the UN Mission, characterized government explanations of rebel chemical weapons acquisition as unconvincing, resting in part upon "poor theories".

Several countries including France, the United Kingdom and the United States debated whether to intervene militarily against Syrian Ba'athist government forces. On 6 September 2013, the United States Senate filed a resolution to authorize use of military force against the Syrian military in response to the Ghouta attack. On 10 September 2013, the military intervention was averted when the Syrian government accepted a US–Russian negotiated deal to turn over "every single bit" of its chemical weapons stockpiles for destruction and declared its intention to join the Chemical Weapons Convention.

In June 2018 the OPCW noted with concern that the Syrian Arab Republic had in reality neither declared nor destroyed all of its chemical weapons and chemical weapons production facilities.

== Background ==
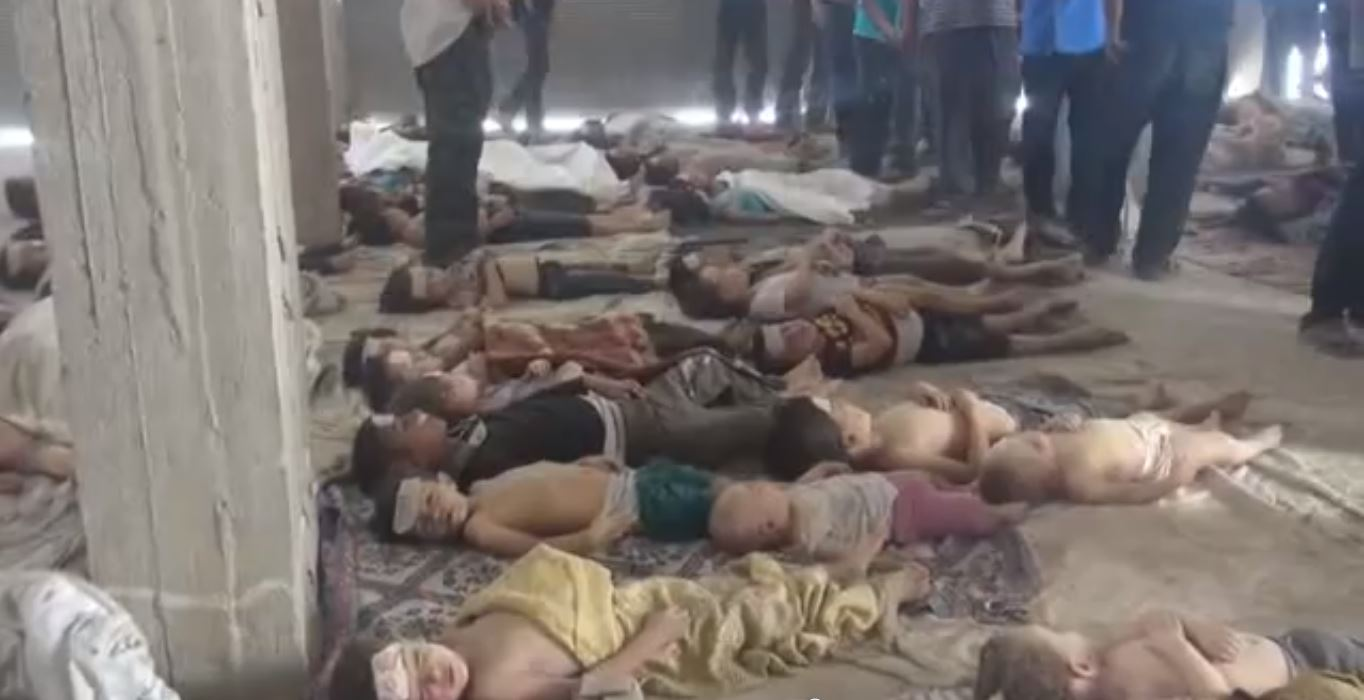
Victims of the Ghouta massacre

The Ghouta area is composed of densely populated suburbs to the east and south of Damascus, part of the province of Rif Dimashq. Ghouta is a primarily conservative Sunni region. Since early in the civil war, civilians in rebel-held Eastern Ghouta almost entirely sided with the opposition to Syria's government. The opposition had controlled much of Eastern Ghouta since 2012, partly cutting off Damascus from the countryside. Muadamiyat al-Sham in Western Ghouta had been under government siege since April 2013. Ghouta had been the scene of continuing clashes for more than a year before the chemical attack, with government forces launching repeated missile assaults trying to dislodge the rebels. The week of the attack, the Syrian government launched an offensive to capture opposition-held Damascus suburbs.

The attack came one year and one day after US President Barack Obama's 20 August 2012 "red line" remarks, in which he warned: "We have been very clear to the Assad regime, but also to other players on the ground, that a red line for us is we start seeing a whole bunch of chemical weapons moving around or being utilized. That would change my calculus. That would change my equation." Syria was one of five non-signatories to the 1997 Chemical Weapons Convention at the time. After the "red line" remarks, and before the chemical attack in Ghouta, chemical weapons were suspected to have been used in four attacks in the country.

=== Khan al-Assal chemical attack ===
The Khan al-Assal chemical attack occurred on 19 March 2013, when a government-controlled area of Khan al-Asal, a district of Aleppo in northern Syria, was struck by a rocket containing the nerve agent sarin. According to the Syrian Observatory for Human Rights the attack resulted in at least 26 fatalities, including 16 government soldiers and 10 civilians. The Syrian government later reported to the United Nations that one soldier and 19 civilians died and that 17 soldiers and 107 civilians were injured. A medic at the local civilian hospital said he personally had witnessed Syrian army soldiers helping the wounded and dealing with fatalities at the scene.

It was later found that the sarin used in the Khan al-Assal attack "bore the same unique hallmarks" as the sarin used in the Ghouta attack.

=== Independent International Commission of Inquiry ===
The United Nations Human Rights Council established the Independent International Commission of Inquiry on the Syrian Arab Republic on 22 August 2011 to investigate human rights violations during the Syrian civil war. One of the topics the commission investigated was possible use of chemical weapons. In early June 2013, the Fifth Report of the Commission of Inquiry stated that there were reasonable grounds to believe that toxic chemicals were used in four attacks, but more evidence was needed "to determine the precise chemical agents used, their delivery systems or the perpetrator". On 22 June, the head of the Commission of Inquiry, Paulo Pinheiro, said the UN could not determine who used chemical weapons in Syria based on evidence sent by the United States, Britain and France.

=== Assessments prior to the attack ===
==== US assessment ====
US Secretary of Defense Chuck Hagel stated on 25 April that US intelligence showed the Assad government had likely used sarin on a small scale. However, the White House announced that "much more" work had to be done to verify the intelligence assessments.

On 13 June 2013, the United States government publicly announced it had concluded that the Assad government had used limited amounts of chemical weapons on multiple occasions against rebel forces, killing 100 to 150 people. US officials stated that sarin was the agent used. Deputy National Security Advisor Ben Rhodes did not say whether this showed that Syria had crossed the "red line" established by President Obama in August 2012. Rhodes stated: "The president has said that the use of chemical weapons would change his calculus, and it has." The French government announced that its own tests confirmed US assertions.

==== Russian assessment ====
Russian Foreign Minister Sergei Lavrov said "the accusations of Damascus using chemical weapons put forth by the United States are not backed by credible facts". Lavrov further stated that the Syrian government had no motive to use chemical weapons since the government already maintained a military advantage over the rebel fighters.

== Attacks ==
The attacks affected two separate opposition-controlled districts in the Damascus suburbs, located 16 kilometres apart.

=== Eastern Ghouta attack ===
The first attack took place around 2:30 a.m. on 21 August 2013 in Eastern Ghouta, a rebel-held suburb to the east of Damascus. The area was on a rebel weapons supply route from Jordan and had been under siege by the Syrian military and Hezbollah for months.

At least 8, and possibly 12, rockets struck within a 1500 by 500-meter area in the Zamalka and nearby Ein Tarma neighborhoods. (Note: In their report Attacks on Ghouta, Human Rights Watch states: "Witness statements and information including GPS locations of rockets found in the area provided by local activists, as well as satellite imagery locations that match the location in the videos, have allowed Human Rights Watch to confirm at least four strike sites in Zamalka where at least eight 330mm rockets struck on August 21. This is unlikely to be a complete account of the number of rockets used in the attack." A map labeled "Map of the 330mm chemical rocket impact locations in Zamalka neighborhood" shows 12 sites. The dimensions of the impact area was found by comparing the Human Rights Watch map to a scaled satellite image.) The rockets were all of the same improvised type, each with an estimated capacity to carry 50–60 liters (11–13 imp gal; 13–16 U.S. gal) of sarin. The rocket engine was similar in type and parameters to a 122 mm GRAD unguided surface-to-surface rocket, while the chemical warhead and the stabilization fin was of an artisan-type. One (or both) of the labs examining the environmental samples taken from Zamalka (and Ein Tarma) found at least traces of sarin in 14 of the 17 cases. One of the labs described the sarin level as a "high level concentration" in 4 of the 17 samples.

=== Western Ghouta attack ===
The second attack took place in the Western Ghouta area around 5:00 in the morning on 21 August. On 22 August, a witness who works for Moadamiya media center said he had counted seven rockets that fell in two areas of Moadamiya during the early morning of 21 August. He said four rockets hit next to the Rawda Mosque and another three in the area between Qahweh Street and Zeytouneh Street, which he said was approximately 500 meters to the east of the Rawda Mosque. He said all the rockets were of the same type.

While no chemical warhead was ever found in the Western Ghouta area, one rocket engine has been identified as a 140mm M-14 unguided surface-to-surface rocket. This type of rocket can be fitted with three types of warheads: high explosive-fragmentation, white phosphorus smoke, or a chemical warhead containing 2 liters (0.44 imp gal; 0.53 U.S. gal) of sarin. None of the 13 environmental samples taken from Western Ghouta tested positive for sarin, although three had "degradation and/or by-products".

== Chemical weapons capability ==
At the time of the attack, Syria was not a party to the Chemical Weapons Convention, which prohibits the development, production, stockpiling, transfer and use of chemical weapons, although in 1968 it acceded to the 1925 Geneva Protocol for the Prohibition of the Use in War of Asphyxiating, Poisonous or Other Gases. In 2012 Syria publicly stated it possessed chemical and biological weapons and would use them if it faced a foreign attack.

According to French intelligence, the Syrian Scientific Studies and Research Center (SSRC) is responsible for producing toxic agents for use in war. A group named "Branch 450" is allegedly responsible for filling munitions with chemicals and maintaining security of the chemical agent stockpiles. As of September 2013, French intelligence estimated the Syrian stockpile at 1,000 tonnes, including mustard gas, VX and "several hundred tonnes of sarin".

The UK's Joint Intelligence Committee publicly dismissed the possibility of rebel responsibility for the attack in Ghouta, stating that rebels are incapable of an attack of its scale. The Committee stated that "there is no credible intelligence or evidence to substantiate the claims or the possession of CW by the opposition".

Åke Sellström, a Swedish scientist who led the UN mission to investigate the attacks, said it was difficult to see how rebels could have weaponized the toxins, but admitted that he did not know who the perpetrator was. According to the Associated Press, "chemical and biological weapons experts have been relatively consistent in their analysis, saying only a military force with access to and knowledge of missile delivery systems and the sarin gas suspected in Ghouta could have carried out an attack capable of killing hundreds of people."

== Initial claims ==
Both the opposition and the Syrian government said a chemical attack was carried out in the suburbs around Damascus on 21 August 2013. Anti-government activists said the Syrian government was to blame for the attack, while the Syrian government said foreign fighters and their international backers were to blame.

=== Opposition claims ===
On the day of the attack, George Sabra, the head of the Syrian National Council, said 1,300 people had been killed as shells loaded with poisonous gas rained down on the capital's eastern suburbs of Douma, Jobar, Zamalka, Arbeen and Ein Tarma. A spokesman for the Free Syrian Army's Supreme Military Council, Qassim Saadeddine, said, "people are growing desperate as they watch another round of political statements and UN meetings without any hope of action". Ahmad Jarba, who was the president of the Syrian National Coalition at the time of the attack, called on the UN investigators to travel to "the site of the massacre" and for an urgent United Nations Security Council meeting on the subject. The Syrian Observatory for Human Rights said the attack was committed by the Syrian regime and called on Ban Ki-moon, Secretary-General of the United Nations, "to apply all pressure within his powers to pressure the Syrian regime".

The next day, a spokesman for the Syrian National Coalition, Khaled al-Saleh, said at least six doctors died after treating victims, and that they didn't yet have the number of dead first responders.

=== Government claims ===
Syria's Deputy Prime Minister for Economic Affairs, Qadri Jamil, said foreign fighters and their international backers were to blame for the attack. Syrian state television, SANA, said the accusations were fabricated to distract a team of UN chemical weapons experts which had arrived three days before the attacks. Syrian President Bashar al-Assad said the claims that his government had used chemical weapons would go against elementary logic and that "accusations of this kind are entirely political". In September 2013, German newspaper Bild claimed to have spoken to a senior intelligence official who claimed Assad did not personally order the chemical attack and that Syrian brigade and division commanders have asked the presidential office for permission to use chemical weapons for more than four months, with permission being denied each time.

== UN investigation ==
On 19 March 2013, the Syrian government reported to the UN Security Council that the rebels had fired a rocket containing chemical materials into a government controlled part of Khan al-Asal, a district of Aleppo in northern Syria, and requested a UN mission to investigate it. As a response, the UN Secretary-General Ban Ki-moon created the "United Nations Mission to Investigate Alleged Uses of Chemical Weapons in the Syrian Arab Republic". The Syrian government first refused to allow the UN mission to be expanded to places outside Khan al-Assal, but agreed in July 2013 to also allow investigation of the alleged attack in Sheikh Maqsood on 13 April 2013 and the alleged attack in Saraqib on 29 April 2013.

On 23 April 2013, The New York Times reported that the British and French governments had sent a confidential letter to the UN Secretary-General, stating there was evidence that the Syrian government had used chemical weapons in Aleppo, Homs and perhaps Damascus. Israel also claimed that the Syrian government had used chemical weapons on 19 March near Aleppo and Damascus. On 24 April, Syria blocked UN investigators from entering Syria, while UN Under-Secretary for Political Affairs Jeffrey Feltman said this would not prevent an inquiry from being carried out.

On 18 August 2013, three days before the Ghouta attack, a UN mission headed by Åke Sellström arrived in Damascus with permission from the Syrian government to investigate earlier alleged chemical weapons use. On the day of the attack, UN Secretary-General Ban Ki-moon expressed "the need to investigate [the Ghouta incident as] soon as possible", hoping for consent from the Syrian government. The next day, UN High Commissioner for Human Rights Navi Pillay urged government and opposition forces to allow an investigation and Ban requested the government provide immediate access. On 23 August, clashes between rebel and government forces continued in and around Ghouta, government shelling continued and UN inspectors were denied access for a second day. White House officials were convinced that the Syrian government was trying to hide the evidence of chemical weapons use by shelling the sites and delaying their inspection. Ban called for a ceasefire to allow the inspectors to visit the attack sites. On 25 August the government and various rebel factions agreed to a ceasefire for five hours each day from 26 to 29 August.

Early in the morning of 26 August several mortars hit central Damascus, including one that fell near the Four Seasons Hotel where the UN inspectors were staying. Later in the day the UN team came under sniper fire en route to Moadamiyah in western Ghouta (to the southwest of central Damascus), forcing them to return to their hotel and replace one of their vehicles before continuing their investigation four hours later. The attack prompted a rebuke from Ban toward the fighters. After returning to Moadamiyah the UN team visited clinics and makeshift field hospitals, collected samples and conducted interviews with witnesses, survivors and doctors. The inspectors spoke with 20 victims of the attacks and took blood and hair samples, soil samples, and samples from domestic animals. As a result of the delay caused by the sniper attack, the team's time in Moadamiyah was substantially shortened, with the scheduled expiry of the daily cease-fire leaving them around 90 minutes on the ground.

On 28 and 29 August the UN team visited Zamalka and Ein Tarma in Eastern Ghouta, east of central Damascus, for a total time of five-and-a-half hours. On 30 August the team visited a Syrian government military hospital in Mazzeh and collected samples. The mission left Syria early on 31 August, over the objection of the Syrian government, promising to return to complete the original objective to investigate the previously alleged attack sites.

=== UN Ghouta Area report ===
The UN report on the investigation into the Ghouta chemical attacks was published on 16 September 2013. The report stated: "the environmental, chemical and medical samples we have collected provide clear and convincing evidence that surface-to-surface rockets containing the nerve agent sarin were used in Ein Tarma, Moadamiyah and Zamalka in the Ghouta area of Damascus." UN Secretary-General Ban Ki-moon called the findings "beyond doubt and beyond the pale", and clear evidence of a war crime. "The results are overwhelming and indisputable", he said. Ban stated a majority of the blood samples, environmental samples and rockets or rocket fragments recovered tested positive for sarin. The report, which was "careful not to blame either side", said that during the mission's work in areas under rebel control, "individuals arrived carrying other suspected munitions indicating that such potential evidence is being moved and possibly manipulated". The UN investigators were accompanied by a rebel leader:

A leader of the local opposition forces ... was identified and requested to take 'custody' of the Mission ... to ensure the security and movement of the Mission, to facilitate the access to the most critical cases/witnesses to be interviewed and sampled by the Mission and to control patients and crowd in order for the Mission to focus on its main activities.

The British UN Ambassador stated that the report's lead author, Åke Sellström, said the quality of the sarin used in the attack was higher than that used by Iraq in the Iran–Iraq War, implying a purity higher than the Iraqi chemical weapons program's low purity of 45–60%.

==== Responses ====
According to Human Rights Watch, hundreds of kilograms of sarin were used in the attack, which it said suggested government responsibility, as opposition forces were not known to possess significant amounts of sarin.

The Russian government dismissed the initial UN report after it was released, calling it "one-sided" and "distorted". On 17 September, Russian Foreign Minister Sergei Lavrov reiterated his government's belief that the opposition carried out the attacks as a "provocation". The United Nations High Representative for Disarmament Affairs Angela Kane said the inspection team would review Russia's objections.

An August 2013 Scientific American article described difficulties that could arise when attempting to identify the manufacturer of sarin from soil or tissue samples.

=== Final UN Mission report ===
The UN inspection team returned to Syria to continue investigations into other alleged chemical attacks in late September 2013. A final report on Ghouta and six other alleged attacks (including three alleged to have occurred after the Ghouta attack) was released in December 2013. The inspectors wrote that they "collected clear and convincing evidence that chemical weapons were used also against civilians, including children, on a relatively large scale in the Ghouta area of Damascus on 21 August 2013". The conclusion was based on:

- Impacted and exploded surface-to-surface rockets, capable to carry a chemical payload, were found to contain sarin;
- Close to the rocket impact sites, in the area where patients were affected, the environment was found to be contaminated by sarin;
- The epidemiology of over fifty interviews given by survivors and health care workers provided ample corroboration of the medical and scientific results;
- A number of patients/survivors were clearly diagnosed as intoxicated by an organophosphorous compound;
- Blood and urine samples from the same patients were found positive for sarin and sarin signatures.

=== UN Human Rights Council report ===
The 7th Report of the Independent International Commission of Inquiry on the Syrian Arab Republic, a different group than the UN fact-finding mission, stated the sarin used in the Ghouta attack bore the "same unique hallmarks" as the sarin used in the Khan al-Assal attack. The report, dated 12 February 2014, also indicated that the perpetrators likely had access to the chemical weapons stockpile of the Syrian military. These conclusions were based on the fact-finding mission's evidence, as the Commission of Inquiry did not conduct its own investigation of either chemical attack.

== Aftermath ==
The continuous fighting has severely limited the quality of medical care for injured survivors of the attack. A month after the attack, approximately 450 survivors still required medical attention for lingering symptoms such as respiratory and vision problems. By early October 2013, the 13,000 residents of Moadhamiya, one of the places targeted in the August attack, had been surrounded by pro-government forces and under siege for five months. Severe malnourishment and medical emergencies had become pressing as all supply lines had stopped. Care for chronic symptoms of sarin exposure had become "just one among a sea of concerns".

As countries such as the United States and the United Kingdom debated their response to the attacks, they encountered significant popular and legislative resistance to military intervention. In particular, British Prime Minister David Cameron's request to the House of Commons to use military force was declined by a 285–272 margin. UK government policy subsequently focused on providing humanitarian assistance inside Syria and to refugees in neighboring countries.

Within a month of the attacks, Syria agreed to join the Chemical Weapons Convention and allow all its stockpiles to be destroyed. The destruction began under OPCW supervision on 6 October 2013. On 23 June 2014, the last shipment of Syria's declared chemical weapons was shipped out of the country for destruction. By 18 August 2014, all toxic chemicals were destroyed aboard the US naval vessel MV Cape Ray.

Nine months after the attack, there was evidence that mothers from the affected areas were giving birth to children with defects and as stillborn.

== Reactions ==
=== Domestic ===
Information Minister Omran al-Zoubi was quoted by the official state news agency, Syrian Arab News Agency (SANA), as saying that the government did not and would not use such weapons, if in fact they even existed. Al-Zoubi said, "everything that has been said is absurd, primitive, illogical and fabricated. What we say is what we mean: there is no use of such things (chemical weapons) at all, at least not by the Syrian army or the Syrian state, and it's easy to prove and it is not that complicated." SANA called the reports of chemical attacks as "untrue and designed to derail the ongoing UN inquiry". A Syrian military official appeared on state television denouncing the reports as "a desperate opposition attempt to make up for rebel defeats on the ground". Deputy Foreign Minister Faisal Mekdad declared it a tactic by the rebels to turn around the civil war which he said "they were losing" and that, though the government had admitted to having stocks of chemical weapons, stated they would never be used "inside Syria". Democratic Union Party leader Salih Muslim said he doubted that the Syrian government carried out the chemical attack.

The National Coalition called the attack a "coup de grace that kills all hopes for a political solution in Syria". In a statement on Facebook, the Coventry-based Syrian Observatory for Human Rights, an anti-government activist network, blamed the attack on the Syrian military and said of the incident that "we assure the world that silence and inaction in the face of such gross and large-scale war crimes, committed in this instance by the Syrian regime, will only embolden the criminals to continue in this path. The international community is thus complicit in these crimes because of its [polarisation], silence and inability to work on a settlement that would lead to the end of the daily bloodshed in Syria."

=== International ===
The international community condemned the attacks. United States President Barack Obama said the US military should strike targets in Syria to retaliate for the government's purported use of chemical weapons, a proposal publicly supported by French President François Hollande, but condemned by Russia and Iran. The Arab League stated it would support military action against Syria in the event of UN support, though member states Algeria, Egypt, Iraq, Lebanon, and Tunisia opposed it.

At the end of August, the House of Commons of the United Kingdom voted against military intervention in Syria. In early September, the United States Congress began debating a proposed authorisation to use military force, although votes on the resolution were indefinitely postponed amid opposition from many legislators and tentative agreement between Obama and Russian President Vladimir Putin on an alternative proposal, under which Syria would declare and surrender its chemical weapons to be destroyed under international supervision.

In contrast to the positions of their governments, polls in early September indicated that most people in the US, UK, Germany and France opposed military intervention in Syria. One poll indicated that 50% of Americans could support military intervention with cruise missiles only, "meant to destroy military units and infrastructure that have been used to carry out chemical attacks". In a survey of American military personnel, around 75% said they opposed air strikes on Syria, with 80% saying an attack would not be "in the U.S. national interest".

=== Allegations of false flag attack ===
The attacks prompted some U.S. intelligence officials to speculate they were carried out by the opposition in order to draw the West into the war, a concept dismissed by others. Other experts and officials questioned whether the government was responsible based on the timing of the attack, just after the UN Mission had arrived in Damascus, and lack of motivation, since the government was advancing in the area.

In December 2013, Seymour Hersh wrote in the London Review of Books (LRB) that a former intelligence official told him that in the days before and after the attack, sensors notifying U.S. intelligence agencies of Syrian chemical weapons deployment did not activate, and that a senior intelligence consultant told him that the U.S. president's Morning Report on 20–22 August contained no information about an impending government chemical weapons attack. In the article, Hersh related that a former senior U.S. intelligence official told him that the U.S. government's published assessment of the incident included an account of the sequence the Syrian military would have followed for any chemical attack, rather than intercepts specifically relating to the Ghouta attacks.

In April 2014 Hersh wrote an article, also published by the LRB, reporting that a former intelligence officer told him that the attacks were "covert action planned by Erdoğan's people to push Obama over the red line", speculating about Turkish government support for Al-Qaeda affiliate Al-Nusra Front's attempts to access sarin. Hersh's argument received some support, but was dismissed by other commentators. The US and Turkish governments denied the accuracy of Hersh's article. In the 2025 documentary film Cover-Up, Hersh admitted that his Syria reporting was flawed, and that he had got the story wrong.

== Evidence ==
=== Witness statements and victim symptoms ===
Syrian human rights lawyer Razan Zaitouneh, who was present in Eastern Ghouta, stated, "Hours [after the shelling], we started to visit the medical points in Ghouta to where injured were removed, and we couldn't believe our eyes. I haven't seen such death in my whole life. People were lying on the ground in hallways, on roadsides, in hundreds." Several medics working in Ghouta reported the administration of large quantities of atropine, a common antidote for nerve agent toxicity, to treat victims.

Doctors Without Borders said the three hospitals it supports in Eastern Ghouta reported receiving roughly 3,600 patients with "neurotoxic symptoms" over less than three hours during the early morning of 21 August. Of those, 355 died. The Local Coordination Committees of Syria claimed that of the 1,338 victims, 1,000 were in Zamalka, of which 600 bodies were transferred to medical points in other towns and 400 remained at a Zamalka medical center. Some of the fatalities were rebel fighters. The deadliness of the attack is believed to have been increased due to civilians reacting to the chemical attack as if it was typical government bombardment. For conventional artillery and rocket attacks, residents usually went to the basements of buildings, where in this case the heavier-than-air sarin sank into these below-ground, poorly ventilated areas. Some of the victims died while sleeping.

Abu Omar of the Free Syrian Army told The Guardian that the rockets involved in the attack were unusual because "you could hear the sound of the rocket in the air but you could not hear any sound of explosion" and no obvious damage to buildings occurred. Human Rights Watch's witnesses reported "symptoms and delivery methods consistent with the use of chemical nerve agents". Activists and local residents contacted by The Guardian said that "the remains of 20 rockets [thought to have been carrying neurotoxic gas] were found in the affected areas. Many [remained] mostly intact, suggesting that they did not detonate on impact and potentially dispersed gas before hitting the ground."

A child in Ghouta froths from the mouth, a medical condition "associated with exposure to nerve agents such as Sarin".

Doctors Without Borders also reported seeing a "large number of victims arriving with symptoms including convulsions, excessive saliva, pinpoint pupils, blurred vision and respiratory distress". Symptoms reported by Ghouta residents and doctors to Human Rights Watch included "suffocation, muscle spasms and frothing at the mouth".

Witness statements to The Guardian about symptoms included "people who were sleeping in their homes [who] died in their beds", headaches and nausea, "foam coming out of [victims'] mouths and noses", a "smell something like vinegar and rotten eggs", suffocation, "bodies [that] were turning blue", a "smell like cooking gas" and redness and itching of the eyes. Richard Spencer of The Telegraph summarised witness statements, stating, "The poison ... may have killed hundreds, but it has left twitching, fainting, confused but compelling survivors."

On 22 August, the Center for Documentation of Violations in Syria published numerous testimonies. It summarised doctors' and paramedics' descriptions of the symptoms as "vomiting, foamy salivation, severe agitation, [pinpoint] pupils, redness of the eyes, dyspnea, neurological convulsions, respiratory and heart failure, blood out of the nose and mouth and, in some cases, hallucinations and memory loss".

==== Analysis of symptoms ====
Dr. Amesh Adalja, a then-senior associate for the Center for Biosecurity at the University of Pittsburgh Medical Center, said the reported symptoms are a textbook case of nerve-agent poisoning.

Médecins Sans Frontières director of operations Bart Janssens stated that MSF "can neither scientifically confirm the cause of these symptoms nor establish who is responsible for the attack. However, the reported symptoms of the patients, in addition to the epidemiological pattern of the events – characterised by the massive influx of patients in a short period of time, the origin of the patients, and the contamination of medical and first aid workers – strongly indicate mass exposure to a neurotoxic agent."

Gwyn Winfield, editorial director at CBRNe World, analysed some videos from the day of the attack and wrote on the magazine's website: "It is difficult to define [an] agent by the signs and symptoms. Clearly respiratory distress, some nerve spasms and a half-hearted washdown (involving water and bare hands?!), but it could equally be a riot control agent as a [chemical warfare agent]."

=== Rockets ===
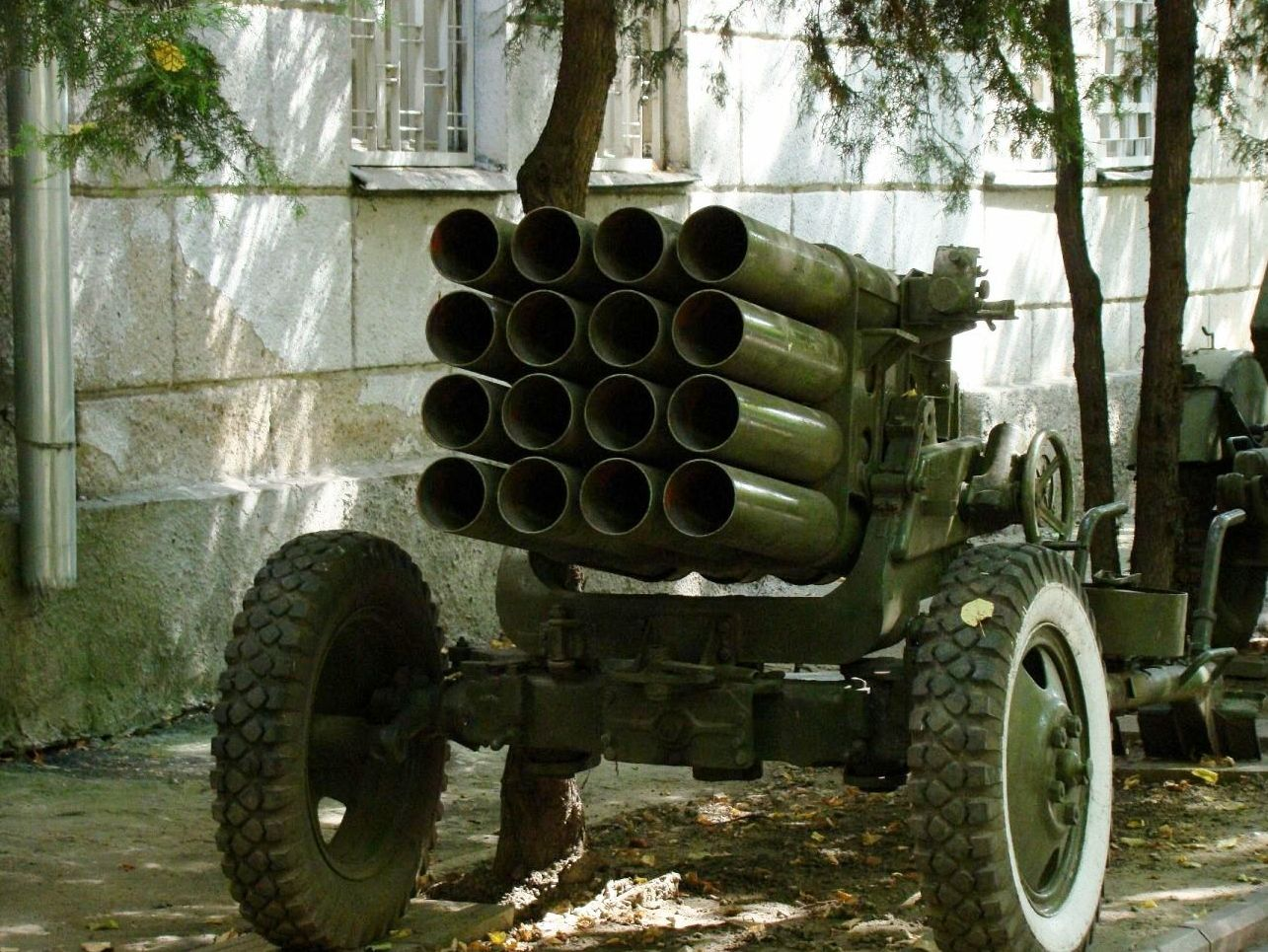
A RPU-14 multiple rocket launcher, of a type that may have launched M-14 munitions found by UN inspectors on 26 August at a site in Moadamiyah

Human Rights Watch reported that two types of rockets were used: in Western Ghouta, a 140mm rocket made in the Soviet Union in 1967 and exported to Syria; and in Eastern Ghouta, a 330mm rocket of unknown origin. HRW also reported that at the time of the attack, Syrian rebels were not known to be in possession of the rockets used.

Seymour Hersh has suggested that the 330mm rockets may have been produced locally, and with a limited range. Eliot Higgins has looked at the munitions linked to the attack and analysed footage of the putative launchers inside government territory.

According to analysis conducted in January 2014 by Theodore Postol and Richard Lloyd, of the Massachusetts Institute of Technology, the rockets used in the attack had a range of about two kilometers, which, the authors claimed, meant that the munitions could not have been fired from the 'heart' or from the Eastern edge of the Syrian Government Controlled Area shown in the Intelligence Map published by the White House on 30 August 2013. A response from Higgins and Kaszeta included an observation that the Russian-language news site ANNA News had posted videos showing a Syrian government military operation running from June to August 2013 to clear positions between Jobar and Qaboun, a strip of land about 2 km away from 21 August impact sites.

Many of the munitions and their fragments had been moved; however, in two cases, the UN could identify the likely launch azimuths. Triangulating rocket trajectories suggests that the origin of the attack may have been within government or rebel-held territory. Consideration of missile ranges influences calculations as to whether rockets originated from the government or rebel-held regions.

In May 2026, an OPCW expert team, supported by the Syrian authorities, discovered significant quantities of undeclared chemical weapons, including rockets and aerial bombs, at high-interest sites in northern coastal and central Syria, including rockets of the same type as those used in the Ghouta attack. Raw ingredients for the production of sarin were found as well.

=== Communications ===
Two purported intercepts of communications that appeared to implicate the Syrian government received prominent media coverage. One was a phone call allegedly between Syrian officials which Israel's Unit 8200 was said to have intercepted and passed to the US. The other was a phone call which the German Bundesnachrichtendienst said it had intercepted, between a high-ranking representative of Hezbollah and the Iranian embassy, in which the purported Hezbollah official said that poison gas had been used and that Assad's order to attack with chemical weapons had been a "big mistake".

On 29 August the Associated Press reported that, according to two U.S. intelligence officials and two other U.S. officials, the U.S. intercept was a conversation between "low-level" Syrian officials with no direct link to the upper echelons of the government or military.

The Bild am Sonntag newspaper subsequently reported that German intelligence indicated that Assad had likely not ordered the attacks. According to Bild, "intelligence interception specialists" relying on communications intercepted by the German vessel Oker said that Syrian military commanders had repeatedly been asking permission to launch chemical attacks for around four months, with permission always being denied from the presidential palace. The sources concluded that 21 August attack had probably not been approved by Bashar al-Assad.

=== Video ===
Murad Abu Bilal, Khaled Naddaf and other Center for Documentation of Violations in Syria and Local Coordination Committees of Syria (LCC) media staff went to Zamalka soon after the attacks to film and obtain other documentary evidence. Almost all the journalists died from inhalation of the neurotoxins, except Murad Abu Bilal, who was the only Zamalka LCC media member to survive. The videos were published on YouTube, attracting worldwide media attention.

Experts who have analysed the first video said it shows the strongest evidence yet consistent with the use of a lethal toxic agent. Visible symptoms reportedly included rolling eyes, foaming at the mouth, and tremors. There was at least one image of a child suffering miosis, the pin-point pupil effect associated with the nerve agent Sarin, a powerful neurotoxin reportedly used before in Syria. Ralph Trapp, a former scientist at the Organisation for the Prohibition of Chemical Weapons, said the footage showed what a chemical weapons attack on a civilian area would look like, and went on to note "This is one of the first videos I've seen from Syria where the numbers start to make sense. If you have a gas attack you would expect large numbers of people, children and adults, to be affected, particularly if it's in a built-up area."

Some experts, among them Jean Pascal Zanders, initially stated that evidence that sarin was used, as claimed by pro-rebel sources, was still lacking and highlighted the lack of second-hand contaminations typically associated with use of weapons-grade nerve agents: "I remain sceptical that it was a nerve agent like sarin. I would have expected to see more convulsions", he said. "The other thing that seems inconsistent with sarin is that, given the footage of first responders treating victims without proper protective equipment, you would expect to see considerable secondary casualties from contamination – which does not appear to be evident." However, after Zanders saw footage imminently after the attack, he changed his mind, saying: "The video footage and pictures this time are of a far better quality. You can clearly see the typical signs of asphyxiation, including a pinkish blueish tinge to the skin colour. There is one image of an adult woman where you can see the tell-tale blackish mark around her mouth, all of which suggests death from asphyxiation." Zanders however cautioned that these symptoms covered a range of neurotoxicants, including some available for civilian use as pest control agents, and said that until the UN reported its analysis of samples, "I can't make a judgement. I have to keep an open mind."

According to a report by The Daily Telegraph, "videos uploaded to YouTube by activists showed rows of motionless bodies and medics attending to patients apparently in the grip of seizures. In one piece of footage, a young boy appeared to be foaming at the mouth while convulsing."

Hamish de Bretton-Gordon, a former commander of British Chemical and Biological counterterrorism forces, told BBC that the images were very similar to previous incidents he had witnessed, although he could not verify the footage.

== Foreign government assessments ==
According to public statements, intelligence agencies in Israel, the United Kingdom, the United States, France, Turkey, and Germany concluded that the Syrian government was most likely responsible for the attacks. Western intelligence agencies agreed that video evidence is consistent with the use of a nerve agent, such as sarin. Laboratory tests showed traces of sarin, in blood and hair samples collected from emergency workers who responded to the attacks.

Russia said there was no evidence tying the Syrian government to the attack and that it was likely carried out by an opposition group.

=== France ===
On 2 September, the French government published a nine-page intelligence report blaming the Syrian government for the Ghouta attacks. An unnamed French government official said that the analysis was carried out by the Directorate-General for External Security (DGSE) and Direction du renseignement militaire (DRM) based on satellite and video images, on-the-ground sources, and samples collected from two April attacks. The report said analysis of samples collected from attacks in Saraqeb and Jobar in April 2013 had confirmed the use of sarin.

The Guardian reported that French intelligence had images that showed rocket attacks on opposition neighborhoods from government-controlled areas to the east and west of Damascus. The report said that the government later launched conventional bombing of those neighborhoods in order to destroy evidence of a chemical attack. Based on analysis of 47 videos, the report said at least 281 fatalities occurred. Using other sources and extrapolation a chemical attack model estimated the total number of death at approximately 1,500.

=== Germany ===
The Bundesnachrichtendienst said it intercepted a phone call between a Hezbollah official and the Iranian Embassy in which the Hezbollah representative criticised Assad's decision to attack with poison gas, apparently confirming its use by the Syrian government. German newspaper Der Spiegel reported on 3 September that BND President Gerhard Schindler told them that based on the agency's evidence, Germany now shared the United Kingdom, United States, and France's view that the attacks were carried out by the Syrian government. However, they also said the attack may have been much more potent than intended, speculating that there may have been an error in mixing the chemical weapons used.

=== Israel ===
Without going into detail, Israeli Intelligence Minister Yuval Steinitz said on 22 August 2013 that Israel's intelligence assessment was that the Syrian government used chemical weapons in the Damascus area. Defense Minister Moshe Ya'alon said the Syrian government had already used chemical weapons against the rebels on a smaller scale multiple times prior to the Ghouta attacks. Fox News reported that Unit 8200 helped provide intelligence to the United States, Israel's closest international ally, implicating the Syrian government in the attacks. Prime Minister Benjamin Netanyahu said at the General debate of the sixty-eighth session of the United Nations General Assembly that Syrian government used the chemical weapons against its own people.

=== Russia ===
Russian officials said that there was no proof that the government of Syria had a hand in the chemical attacks. Russian Foreign Minister Sergei Lavrov described the American, British and French intelligence reports as "unconvincing" and said at a joint news conference with his French counterpart Laurent Fabius after the release of the United Nations report in mid-September that he continued to believe the rebels carried out the attack. Russian President Vladimir Putin said he wanted to see evidence that would make it "obvious" who used chemical weapons in Ghouta.

In a commentary published in The New York Times on 11 September 2013, Putin wrote that "there is every reason to believe [poison gas] was used not by the Syrian Army, but by opposition forces, to provoke intervention by their powerful foreign patrons". Lavrov said on 18 September that "new evidence" given to Russia by the Syrian government would be forthcoming.

=== Turkey ===
The Turkish government-run Anadolu Agency published an unconfirmed report on 30 August 2013, pointing to the Syrian 155th Missile Brigade and the 4th Armored Division as the perpetrators of the two attacks. It said the attack had involved 15 to 20 missiles with chemical warheads at around 02:45 on 21 August, targeting residential areas between Douma and Zamalka in Eastern Ghouta. It claimed that the 155th Missile Brigade had used 9K52 Luna-M missiles, M600 missiles, or both, fired from Kufeyte, while other rockets with a 15- to 70-kilometer range were fired by the 4th Armored Division from Mount Qasioun. The agency did not explain its source.

=== United Kingdom ===
A report on the attacks by the United Kingdom's Joint Intelligence Committee (JIC) was published on 29 August 2013 prior to a vote on intervention by the House of Commons of the United Kingdom. The report said at least 350 people were killed and that it was "highly likely" that the attacks had been carried out by the Syrian government, resting in part on the firm view that the Syrian opposition was not capable of carrying out a chemical weapons attack on this scale, and on the JIC view that the Syrian government had used chemical weapons in the Syrian civil war on a small scale on 14 previous occasions. Analysis of the Ghouta attacks themselves was based largely on reviewing video footage and publicly available witness evidence. The report conceded problems with motivation for the attacks, saying there was "no obvious political or military trigger for regime use of CW on an apparently larger scale now". British officials said they believe the Syrian military used chemical weapons, including the nerve agent sarin, on a small scale against the opposition on at least 14 times prior to the Ghouta attacks and described "a clear pattern of regime use" of the nerve agent since 2012.

A vote in the House of Commons to approve UK participation in military action against Syria was narrowly rejected, with some MPs arguing that the case for Syrian government culpability was not sufficiently strong to justify approving action. Prime Minister David Cameron, who advocated for the strike, said in the debate that "in the end there is no 100 percent certainty about who is responsible" but that his officials were "as certain as possible" that Assad's forces were to blame.

=== United States ===
A controversial "US government assessment of the Ghouta attacks" was published by the White House on 30 August 2013, with a longer classified version made available to members of Congress. The report blamed the chemical attacks on the Syrian government, saying rockets containing a nerve agent were fired from government-held territory into neighborhoods in the early morning, impacting at least 12 locations. It stated 1,429 people were killed, including at least 426 children. It dismissed the possibility that evidence supporting the US government's conclusion could have been manufactured by the opposition, stating it "does not have the capability" to fabricate videos, eyewitness accounts, and other information. The report also said that the US believed Syrian officials directed the attacks, based on "intercepted communications". A major element, as reported by news media, was an intercepted telephone call between a Syrian Ministry of Defense official and a Syrian 155th Brigade chemical weapons unit commander in which the former demanded answers for the attacks. According to an unnamed Mossad agent quoted in the German magazine Focus, this phone intercept was provided to the U.S. by Israeli Intelligence Corps Unit 8200.

The U.S. government assessment suggested a motive for the attack, describing it as "a desperate effort to push back rebels from several areas in the capital's densely packed eastern suburbs". The report then states that evidence suggests "the high civilian death toll surprised and panicked senior Syrian officials, who called off the attack and then tried to cover it up". Secretary of State John Kerry later announced that hair, blood, soil, and cloth samples collected from the attack sites had tested positive for sarin or its immediate breakdown products.

Congressmen Alan Grayson and Tom Harkin (Democrats) and Michael Burgess (Republican) expressed skepticism about the US intelligence report, calling the evidence circumstantial and thin. Grayson offered some details regarding the classified report, which he described as 12 pages long, and criticized both the four-page public summary and the classified report. Grayson said the unclassified summary relied on "intercepted telephone calls, 'social media' postings and the like, but not one of these is actually quoted or attached … (As to whether the classified summary is the same, I couldn't possibly comment, but again, draw your own conclusion.)" Grayson cited as a problematic example the intercepted phone call between a Syrian Ministry of Defense official and the Syrian 155th Brigade, the transcript of which was not provided in the classified report, leaving Grayson unable to judge the accuracy of a report in The Daily Caller that the call's implications had been misrepresented in the report.

The AP quoted anonymous US intelligence officials as saying that the evidence presented in the report linking Assad to the attack was "not a slam dunk". Jeffrey Goldberg also reported that James Clapper, the Director of National Intelligence, personally told President Obama that the case for the Syrian government's responsibility was strong but not a "slam dunk". The AP later characterized the evidence released by the administration as circumstantial and said the government had denied its requests for more direct evidence, including satellite imagery and communications intercepts cited in the government assessment.

On 8 September 2013, the then White House Chief-of-Staff, Denis McDonough said the administration lacks the "irrefutable, beyond-a-reasonable-doubt evidence", but that a "common-sense test" implicates Assad.

Obama's request that Congress authorize military force was not put to a vote of either the House of Representatives or the Senate, and the president ultimately said that "I wouldn't say I'm confident" that he could convince Congress to support strikes against Syria.

== Legal status ==
=== Attack ===
At the time of the attack, Syria was not a member of the Chemical Weapons Convention. However, Human Rights Watch argues that the Ghouta chemical attack was illegal under a different international agreement:

Syria is a party to the 1925 Geneva Gas protocol, which bans the use in war of asphyxiating, poisonous or other gases, and of all analogous liquids, materials or devices. The use of chemical weapons is also prohibited as a matter of customary international humanitarian law, or the laws of war. The prohibition on the use of chemical weapons applies to all armed conflicts, including so-called non-international armed conflicts such as the current fighting in Syria. The International Criminal Tribunal for the former Yugoslavia, in the Tadic case, stated "there undisputedly emerged a general consensus in the international community on the principle that the use of [chemical] weapons is also prohibited in internal armed conflicts.

Ian Hurd, associate professor of political science at Northwestern University, stated:

But the problem is that, legally, the Gas Protocol regulates only wars between states, not civil wars. It does not govern how a government behaves inside its own territory.

In other words, under its current obligations Syria is forbidden from using gas against its neighbours but not against its own people.

=== International Criminal Court referral ===
Human Rights Watch stated that the UN Security Council should refer the Syria situation to the International Criminal Court (ICC) "to ensure accountability for all war crimes and crimes against humanity". Amnesty International also said that the Syria situation should be referred to the ICC because "the best way for the United States to signal its abhorrence for war crimes and crimes against humanity and to promote justice in Syria, would be to reaffirm its support for the Rome Statute establishing the International Criminal Court". However, as the amendment to the Rome Statute of the International Criminal Court explicitly making it a war crime to use chemical weapons in an internal conflict has not been ratified by most states nor Syria, the legal situation is complex and reliant on the attack being a part of a wider war crime. China and Russia have repeatedly used their status as members of the U.N. Security Council to block any attempt to bring Syria under the jurisdiction of the ICC; by 2017, Russia had used its veto power at least seven times to prevent the U.N. Security Council from taking action.

=== Legal investigations in Germany, France, and Sweden ===
After Russia and China blocked attempts to set up an international tribunal for Syria, survivors of the attack and human rights organizations have taken legal action in France, Germany, and Sweden. In October 2020, three human rights organizations submitted, on behalf of the victims of the attack, a criminal complaint and a dossier of evidence to Germany's federal public prosecutor in Karlsruhe; the dossier includes testimony from at least 17 survivors of the attack and 50 defectors from the Syrian government with knowledge of the government's chemical weapons program or plans to carry out chemical attacks in Ghouta and Khan Shaykhun.

In February 2021, lawyers representing victims of the attack and two international human rights groups filed with judges at a special war crimes unit in France's palace of justice a complaint regarding the Syrian government's use of chemical weapons. The complaints were accepted in Sweden, Germany and France and trigger a criminal investigation of Bashar al-Assad, his brother Maher, and other senior advisers and military officials. The complaint is based on evidence compiled by the Syrian Archive, and includes testimonies from survivors and defectors, an analysis of the Syrian military chain of command, and hundreds of items of documentary evidence, including photos and videos. In April 2021, lawyers representing victims of the attack filed a criminal complaint against members of the Syrian government, including Bashar al-Assad, with Swedish police, setting in motion a possible investigation into the role of Assad and other government officials. On 15 November 2023, French judges issued arrest warrants for Bashar and Maher al-Assad, as well as two unidentified Syrian government officials, for their involvement in the attack. On 25 July 2025, the French Court of Cassation annulled Bashar al-Assad's arrest warrant, saying that he enjoyed presidential immunity at the time of the attack, but allowed the investigations against him to continue and new warrants to be issued against him.

== Remembrance ==
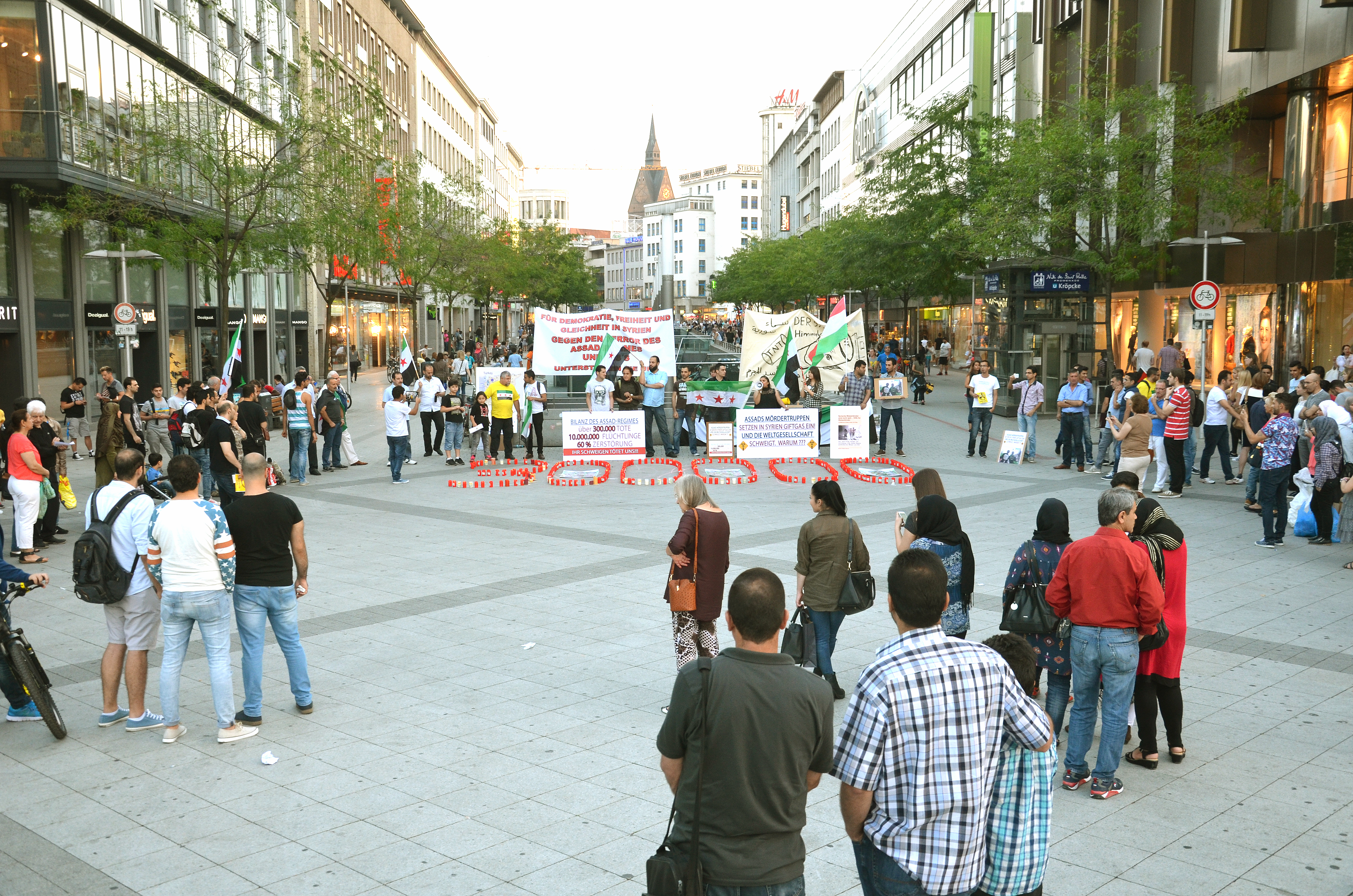
Demonstration against the Assad regime on the second anniversary of Ghouta massacre in Hannover, 21 August 2015

The Ghouta attack is marked annually by Syrians in opposition territories, Syrian Refugees and pro-revolution supporters in solidarity all across the world, and in 2025 also around Damascus and Rif Dimashq governorates. The United States Holocaust Memorial Museum marked the ninth anniversary of Ghouta chemical attack, describing the event as "a new nadir" in the list of horrific atrocities of Bashar al-Assad.

On 21 August 2022, US government issued a press release stating:

Nine years ago, early in the morning of 21 August 2013, the Assad regime released the nerve agent sarin on Syrian civilians in the Ghouta district of Damascus, killing more than 1,400 people – many of them children. Today, we recall with continuing horror this tragic event and we recommit ourselves to accountability for the perpetrators. The United States remembers and honors the victims and survivors of the Ghouta attack and the many other chemical attacks we assess the Assad regime has launched. We condemn in the strongest possible terms any use of chemical weapons anywhere, by anyone, under any circumstances... The United States strongly supports international and Syrian-led efforts to seek justice for the innumerable atrocities committed against the people of Syria, some of which rise to the level of war crimes and crimes against humanity.

— US Department of State Press Statement (21 August 2022),

== See also ==
- 2014 Kafr Zita chemical attack
- American-led intervention in the Syrian civil war
- Casualties of the Syrian civil war
- Chemical attack on Behbahan battalion
- Destruction of Syria's chemical weapons
- Douma chemical attack (2018)
- Foreign involvement in the Syrian civil war
- Halabja massacre
- History of chemical warfare
- Khan Shaykhun chemical attack
- List of massacres during the Syrian civil war
- List of unsolved murders (2000–present)
- Syria and weapons of mass destruction
- Tokyo subway sarin attack
- Use of chemical weapons in the Syrian civil war
