= Zamalka =

Zamalka زملكا
- Village
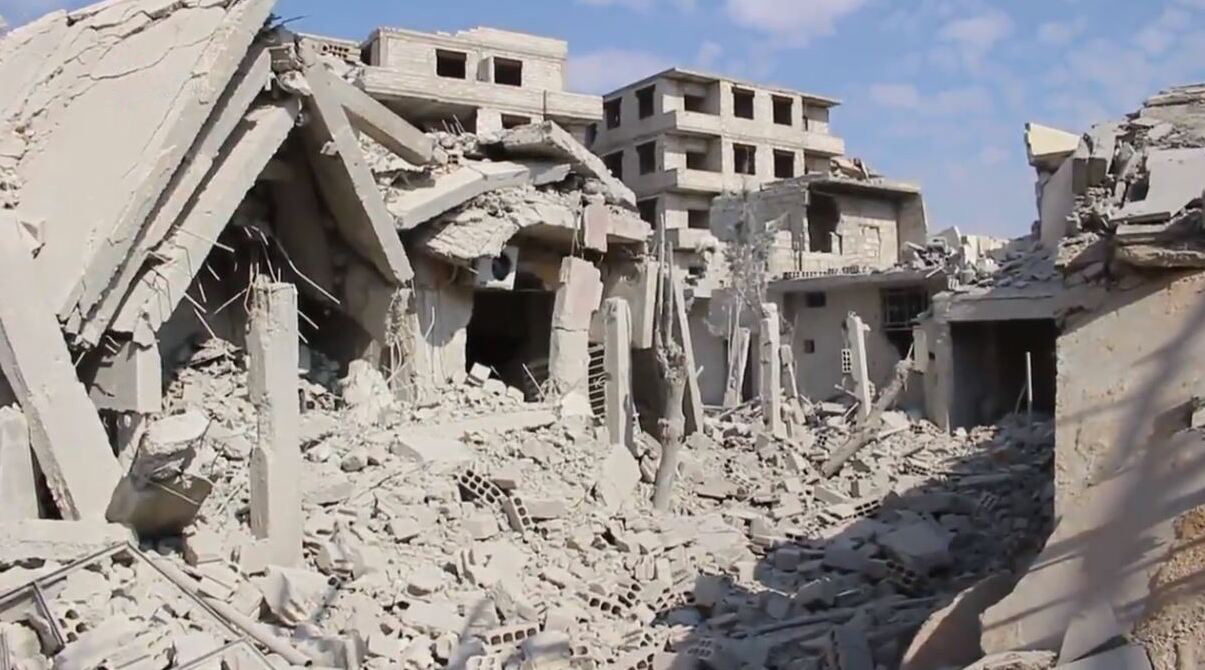
- Zamalka in 2018.

- Location within Syria
- Coordinates: 33°31′31″N 36°21′10″E
- Country: Syria
- Governorate: Rif Dimashq Governorate
- District: Markaz Rif Dimashq
- Nahiyah: Arbin

Population (2004 census)
  - Total: 44,661
- Time zone: UTC+2 (EET)
  - Summer (DST): UTC+3 (EEST)

Zamalka (Arabic: زملكا) is a town of Damascus in Syria, located 3.5 kilometers (2.2 mi) east-northeast of Old Damascus. It is administratively a part of the Markaz Rif Dimashq District of the Rif Dimashq Governorate. Nearby localities include Jobar and Qaboun to west and northwest, Harasta and Arbin to north and northeast, Hamouriyah and Saqba to east, Kafr Batna to southeast, Ein Tarma to the south and Al-Maamouniye to southwest. The Aleppo-Damascus Highway is the districts boundary in the west, separating Zamalka from the Jobar municipality of Damascus.

According to the Syria Central Bureau of Statistics, Zamalka had a population of 44,661 in the 2004 census.

== History ==
Zamalka was visited by Syrian geographer Yaqut al-Hamawi in the early 13th century, during Ayyubid rule. He noted that it was "a village of the Ghautah of Damascus. The Syrians often pronounce the name Zamluka."

Zamalka was under rebel control for much of the Syrian Civil War. It was one of the areas hit by a sarin attack on 21 August 2013 (the Ghouta chemical attack) during the Rif Dimashq offensive (March–August 2013). Rebels surrendered to government forces on 23 March 2018, during the Rif Dimashq offensive (February–April 2018).

== Bibliography ==
- le Strange, Guy (1890). Palestine Under the Moslems: A Description of Syria and the Holy Land from A.D. 650 to 1500. Committee of the Palestine Exploration Fund.
