= Hamouriyah =

Hamouriyah حمورية
- Village
- Location within Syria
- Coordinates: 33°31′39″N 36°23′13″E
- Country: Syria
- Governorate: Rif Dimashq
- District: Markaz Rif Dimashq
- Subdistrict: Kafr Batna

Population (2004)
  - Total: 13,760
- Time zone: UTC+2 (EET)
  - Summer (DST): UTC+3 (EEST)

Hamouriyah (Arabic: حمورية), also spelled Hamoryah, Hamouria, Hammurah or Hammuriya, is a village in Syria. It is administratively a part of the Kafr Batna nahiyah, in the Markaz district of the Rif Dimashq Governorate. The town is located about 12 kilometers (7.5 mi) east of Damascus city center, within an area called the Eastern Ghouta. It is located 3 kilometers (1.9 mi) east of Zamalka.

== Syrian Civil War ==
Hamouriyah was one of the areas hit by a sarin gas attack on August 21st, 2013 (The Ghouta chemical attack) which killed over 1,000 people and is the deadliest chemical attack of the Syrian civil war.

Hamouriyah was under rebel control for much of the war until it was recaptured by Government forces in 2018, during the Rif Dimashq offensive (February–April 2018).
