= Åke Sellström =

Swedish weapons expert (born 1948)

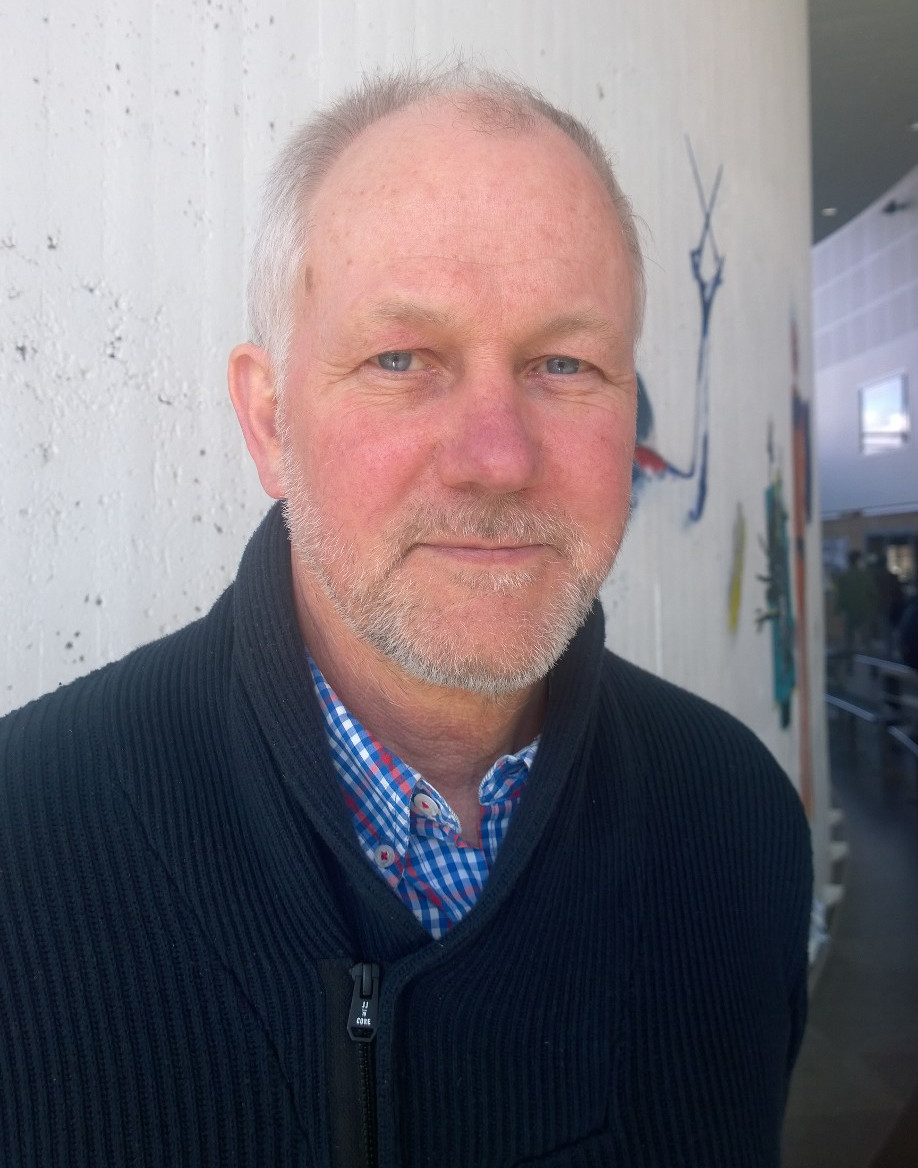
- Sellström in 2014
- Born: 2 November 1948 (age 77)
- Education: University of Gothenburg
- Scientific career
- Thesis: Gamma-aminobutyric acid transport in brain (1975)

Åke Sellström (born 2 November 1948) is a Swedish academic and expert in arms, especially in chemical weapons. He has been active at the Swedish Defence Research Agency (FOI).

== Biography ==
Sellström received his Ph.D. in 1975 at University of Gothenburg.

He was one of the United Nations inspectors who examined the use of chemical weapons in Iraq in the 1990s. He returned to the country in 2002 to examine whether the government had restored the banned weapons program, for which the inspectors found no evidence. He has held various positions with the United Nations, including as Chief Inspector with the United Nations Special Commission (UNSCOM) and as Senior Adviser to the Chairmen of UNSCOM and the United Nations Monitoring, Verification and Inspection Commission (UNMOVIC) for the disarmament of Iraq.

In March 2013, Sellström was appointed head of the UN team to investigate the possible use of chemical warfare weapons during the Syrian civil war. His team published a report on the 21 August Ghouta chemical attacks in September 2013.

In Sweden, Sellström has conducted research on biological and chemical weapons at the European CBRNE Center at Umeå University, and before that at the Swedish Defence Research Agency (FOI) in Umeå. It was through this service that he was recognized internationally, which resulted in the UN missions.
