= Arbin, Syria =

Town in southern Syria

Arbin عربين
- Town
- Location within Syria
- Coordinates: 33.538535°N 36.366068°E
- Country: Syria
- Governorate: Rif Dimashq
- District: Markaz Rif Dimashq
- Subdistrict: Arbin
- Elevation: 690 m (2,260 ft)

Population (2004)
  - Total: 44,934
- Time zone: UTC+3 (EET)
  - Summer (DST): UTC+2 (EEST)

Arbin (Arabic: عربين; also spelled Irbin or Arbeen) is a town in southern Syria, administratively part of the Markaz Rif Dimashq District of the Rif Dimashq Governorate, located just east of Jobar neighborhood of Damascus. Nearby localities include Kafr Batna and Saqba to the south, Zamalka and Ein Tarma to the southwest, and Douma to the north. According to the Syria Central Bureau of Statistics (CBS), Arbin had a population of 44,934 in the 2004 census. Arbin is one of the suggested locations for the ancient town of Riblah.

== History ==
During the Syrian civil war, FSA took control of a number of suburbs north of the capital Damascus, including Arbin on 2 July 2012. FSA fighters reportedly openly patrolled the streets of the suburbs, and clashes occurred less than 10 kilometres (6.2 mi) from the center of Damascus city itself. In November 2012, there was sustained fighting in the town after a regain in strength of the rebels in Rif Dimashq. It was reported to be under rebel control as of 7 December 2012. In 2017–18, during the government siege of eastern Ghouta, Arbin was one of the towns targeted in multiple airstrikes by Syrian and Russian aircraft, for instance on 4 January 2018.

In the end of March 2018, the Syrian army imposed their control over the area of Eastern Ghouta including Arbin. Arbin was recaptured by opposition forces in the 2024 Rebel Offensives and Fall of Damascus.
