= Beit Nayim =

Beit Nayim بيت نايم
- Village
- Location in Syria
- Coordinates: 33°30′45″N 36°26′22″E
- Country: Syria
- Governorate: Rif Dimashq
- District: Markaz Rif Dimashq
- Subdistrict: Nashabiyeh

Population (2004)
  - Total: 2,853
- Time zone: UTC+2 (EET)
  - Summer (DST): UTC+3 (EEST)
- City Qrya Pcode: C2363

Beit Nayim (alternative spelling: Beit Nayem, Beit Na'em, Beit Naem), (Arabic: بيت نايم) is a Syrian village located in Markaz Rif Dimashq, Rif Dimashq. According to the Syria Central Bureau of Statistics (CBS), Beit Nayim had a population of 2,853 in the 2004 census.
