= Ein Tarma =

Ein Tarma عيـن تـرمـا
- Village
- Location within Syria
- Coordinates: 33°30′52″N 36°20′54″E
- Country: Syria
- Governorate: Rif Dimashq
- District: Markaz Rif Dimashq
- Subdistrict: Arbin
- Time zone: UTC+2 (EET)
  - Summer (DST): UTC+3 (EEST)

Ein Tarma (Arabic: عيـن تـرمـا), also spelled Ayn Tarma or Ain Terma, is a suburb of Damascus in Syria, located 3 kilometers (1.9 mi) east of Old Damascus, just north of the Barada River, within an area called the Eastern Ghouta. It is administratively a part of the Arbin subdistrict, in the Markaz district of the Rif Dimashq Governorate. Nearby localities include Jobar and Zamalka to the north, Hazeh to east, Kafr Batna to southeast, the Ein Tarma Valley to south and Zablatani, Souq al-Hal and Al-Maamouniye to the west.

== During Syrian Civil War ==
Ein Tarna was under rebel control for much of the Syrian Civil War. It was one of the areas hit by a sarin attack on 21 August 2013 (the Ghouta chemical attack) during the Rif Dimashq offensive (March–August 2013). Rebels surrendered to government forces on 23 March 2018, during the Rif Dimashq offensive (February–April 2018).
