= Jisrin =

Jisrin جسرين Jisrein
- Village
- Location within Syria
- Coordinates: 33°30′23″N 36°23′9″E
- Country: Syria
- Governorate: Rif Dimashq
- District: Markaz Rif Dimashq
- Subdistrict: Kafr Batna

Population (2004)
  - Total: 9,442
- Time zone: UTC+3 (EET)
  - Summer (DST): UTC+2 (EEST)
- City Qrya Pcode: C2317

Jisrin (Arabic: جسرين; also spelled Jisrein) is a village in southern Syria, administratively part of the Markaz Rif Dimashq District of the Rif Dimashq Governorate, located just east of Damascus. According to the Syria Central Bureau of Statistics (CBS), Jisrin had a population of 9,442 in the 2004 census.
