= Muadamiyat al-Sham =

Muadamiyat al-Sham المعضمية الشام
- Town
- Location within Syria
- Coordinates: 33.46°N 36.19°E
- Country: Syria
- Governorate: Rif Dimashq
- District: Darayya
- Subdistrict: Darayya

Population (2004 census)
  - Total: 52,738
- Time zone: UTC+2 (EET)
  - Summer (DST): UTC+3 (EEST)

Muadamiyat al-Sham (Arabic: المعضمية الشام, romanized: al-Muʿaḍḍamīyah ash-Shām; also spelled Moadamiyet al-Sham, Moadamiya or Moadamiyah) is a town in southern Syria, administratively a part of the Darayya District in the Rif Dimashq Governorate, located approx. 10 kilometers (6.2 mi) southwest of Damascus, within an area called the Western Ghouta. Nearby localities include the centre of Darayya to the east, Jdeidat Artouz and Sahnaya to the south, and Qudsaya to the north. The town is "famed for its olive orchards".

== Etymology ==
Muadamiyat was named after Al-Mu'azzam Isa, who was a Kurdish Sultan from Ayyubid dynasty ruled Damascus from 1218 to 1227.

== History ==
In 1838, Eli Smith noted el-Mu'addamiyeh as being located in the Wady el-'Ajam, and being populated by Sunni Muslims.

== Demographics ==
According to the Syria Central Bureau of Statistics, the town had a population of 52,738 in the 2004 census.

== Civil war ==
During the Syrian civil war, Moadamiyah was encircled and besieged by pro-government forces from April 2013, and was one of the areas of Damascus hit by a sarin attack on 21 August 2013 (the Ghouta chemical attack) during the Rif Dimashq offensive (March–August 2013). When a Wall Street Journal reporter visited the town in October 2013, the population of the still-besieged town was down to an estimated 12,500, and residents said food supplies were exhausted. During the Khan al-Shih offensive (October–November 2016), the rebels in control of the town agreed to surrender to the Syrian Army in September 2016. The take-over occurred on 19 October 2016, most of the rebels choosing to leave for Idlib along with over 2000 residents.
