= Jobar =

Village in Damascus Governorate, Syria

Jobar جَوْبَر
- Municipality
- Joubar on the District map of Damascus

- Location within Syria
- Coordinates: 33°31′51.6″N 36°20′13.6″E
- Country: Syria
- Governorate: Damascus Governorate
- City: Damascus
- Time zone: UTC+2 (EET)
  - Summer (DST): UTC+3 (EEST)
- Climate: BSk

Jobar (Arabic: جَوْبَر, romanized: Jawbar) also Jawbar, Jober or Joubar, is a village on the outskirts of Damascus northeast of the old city walls. It contains the most venerated site for Syrian Jews, the 2,000-year-old Jobar Synagogue, named for the biblical prophet Elijah, and has been a place of Jewish pilgrimage for many centuries. Today 93% of Jobar lies in ruins due to a prolonged battle fought between the Syrian Army and various rebel groups from February 2013 to 23 March 2018. It has been the site of hostilities during Syrian Civil War, including the 2017 Jobar offensive.

== History ==
One of the earliest sources mentioning the existence of the village is from the Talmud, which states that the village was one of ten surrounding Damascus inhabited by Jews. Rabbi Rafram bar Papa was recorded as having prayed in the synagogue of Jobar. During the medieval period, it was "the most important and longest lasting Jewish community outside of the old city walls." An anonymous Jewish traveller who arrived a few years after the Edict of Expulsion found 60 Jewish families living in the village of Jobar, who had a "very beautiful synagogue." Ibn Tulun (died 1546) mentions that "Jobar is a Jewish village with a Muslim presence." The "Chronicle" of Joseph Sambari (1672) says that the Jewish community of Damascus lived chiefly in Jobar and in 1735 the village was populated solely by Jews.

Documents from the early 19th century describe properties in the village that belonged to Jewish wakf (religious endowment) and were leased to members of other communities. In 1839, the village was described as "...prettily situated on a green fertile spot," that formed part of the Garden that surrounds Damascus. The inhabitants were reported as numbering 1,000 and seeming to be in a "tolerably prosperous state." Its population was "wholly Hebrew" and governed by local Jewish institutions with a "little hierarchy of rulers and subjects." During the rioting following accusation of ritual murder against the Jews of Damascus in 1840, the mob fell upon the synagogue, pillaged it and destroyed the scrolls of the Law.

The winter in Damascus is sometimes long and dreary; and when the spring comes… the Jews begin to visit Jobar, by some thought to be built on the site of the ancient Hobah. It is a large village about three quarters of an hour's ride from the city, and is inhabited entirely by Mohammedans; but strange to say, the Jews have a synagogue and a few rooms in the court adjoining it. Only the people who have charge of the synagogue live there; but during the spring and summer we constantly see Jews riding on donkeys laden with beds and bedding, and going out to spend three or four days or a week in these rooms.

— Mrs. Mackintosh, 1883.

There are conflicting reports from the mid-19th century onwards as to the ethno-religious makeup of the village. In 1839, it was reported that the village "is entirely peopled by Jews." But an account a few years later in 1847 stated that the village was home to three to four thousand Muslims, with the exception of one Jewish family who took care of the synagogue, and according to a certain Mr. Graham, "the village, the people, the synagogue and the family that inhabit it, are wretched and miserable in the extreme." In 1869, a visitor, while acknowledging the existence of the old synagogue, questions if there was ever a permanent Jewish presence in the village. She goes on to reveal that the village is, however, a "favourite resort of wealthy Jews...It is their park and café. There they spend their long summer afternoons, often the entire night, under the bower of vine and jasmine." A publication in 1874 makes a claim to the contrary, that the village is "principally a colony of Jews". It is probable that the Jewish population must have dwindled, since by 1893, Richard F. Burton writes "it is a Muslim village with a synagogue dedicated to Elijah and is a pilgrimage for Damascus Jews", and the 1907 edition of Cook's handbook for Palestine and Syria states that "Jobar is only a Muslim village." However, during these years, Jewish visits to the village persisted, and on festival days many of the Damascus Jews assembled at the synagogue to worship.

After the establishment of the State of Israel, Jews in Syria faced greater discrimination as the Syrian government enforced tighter restrictions. Jewish property could not be sold and those that had been abandoned were confiscated. A religious centre in the neighbourhood was taken over by Palestinian Arabs and the old synagogue was converted into a school for displaced Arabs.

The neighbourhood is the burial-place of a wonder-working sage of the 16th century, the patriarch of the Abuhatzeira rabbinical dynasty, Rabbi Shmuel Elbaz-Abuchatzira. The fate of the synagogue remains a source of controversy.

== Conservation project ==
On July 28, 2010, a number of TV satellite dishes were removed by municipal workers enforcing a conservation project in the neighborhood.
