= Ghuta =

Suburb of Damascus, Syria

Coordinates: 33°30′00″N 36°25′15″E

Ghouta (Arabic: غُوطَةُ دِمَشْقَ / ALA-LC: Ḡūṭat Dimašq) is a countryside area in southwestern Syria that surrounds the city of Damascus along its eastern and southern rim.

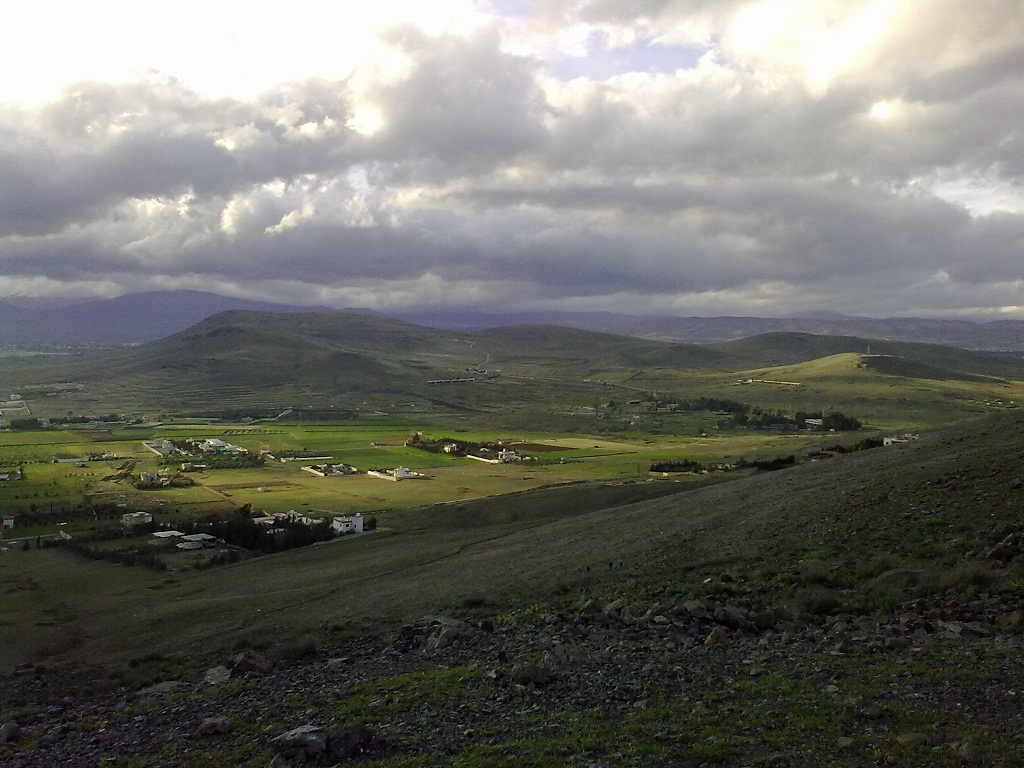
View of Ghouta from the mountains surrounding the area

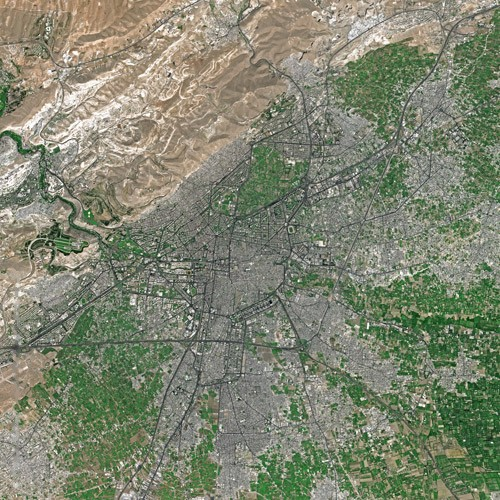
A satellite view of Damascus in 2006

== Name ==
Ghouta is an Arabic term (ghuta) for 'garden'.

== Geography ==
The Ghouta is an oasis formed by the Barada River, as its waters flow east of Mount Qasioun, and its seven tributaries. It surrounds the city of Damascus. To the east and south of the Ghouta lies the Marj plain, which forms a narrow belt of fields, and south of that lies the Hauran plain. The Barada River Valley borders the Ghouta to the northeast. The area north of the Ghouta is less fertile and eventually desolate hill country. To the west of the region is the Anti-Lebanon Mountains.

The Ghouta is historically the most celebrated 'green zone' (a verdant, fertile area around an urban center) in the Levant, according to the historian Beshara Doumani. He also notes that its fame in this regard persists, despite the significant loss of its planted areas to the development of suburban sprawl, extensive highways, and the effects of the Syrian Civil War. It was historically characterized by farming villages, vast gardens, orchards, and vineyards, which stretched up to 10 kilometers (6.2 mi) from the limits of the Old City of Damascus. The lands of the Ghouta were fed by irrigation. These factors distinguished it from the rain-dependent, mainly grain-growing Marj.

The size of the Ghouta has varied considerably at different times and according to different surveys and estimates. In the 20th century, the Syrian journalist Muhammad Kurd Ali approximated that it spanned an area 20 by 10 kilometers (12.4 mi × 6.2 mi), which is equal to 19,912 hectares, while a 2000 a survey reported that the region spanned 19,000 hectares.

== History ==
The Jerusalemite geographer, al-Muqaddasi (d. 991), mentions the Ghouta as being one of the six rural territories belonging to Jund Dimashq (district of Damascus). (Note: The others being Hawrān, al-Bathaniyya, al-Jawlān, al-Biqāʿ and al-Hūla.)

Since ancient times, canals dug by Damascenes provided irrigation of land on either side of the Barada, increasing the size of the Ghouta to the south and east of the city. Separating the city from the dry grasslands bordering the Syrian Desert, the Ghouta has historically provided its inhabitants with a variety of cereals, vegetables, and fruits.

=== Ottoman period ===
Throughout much of the 19th century, most of the Ghouta farmlands were held by middle-class, small-scale landholders, who the historian James Reilly terms as "gentleman farmers". This type of land tenure was enabled by "the intensive and commercial nature of irrigated agriculture", according to Doumani. These farmers, part of whom were tenants and the other part possessors of usufruct rights, did not cultivate the lands themselves, but hired laborers with the considerable revenues they derived from their small plots.

In the early 20th century, an estimated three-quarters of the Ghouta's lands were owned by small and medium-sized planters, known as zurra, a rare occurrence among the agricultural regions of the Levant at that time. The remainder of the lands were owned by members of the Damascene urban elite.

=== French colonial period ===
The Ghouta was the site of a French offensive against Druze rebels in 1926.

=== Independent Syria ===
In 1965, the first small-scale state-owned farm collectives in Syria were established in the Ghouta, afterward spreading to other areas of the country.

Eventually the irrigated agricultural area in the Damascus countryside reached a size of 370 square kilometers (140 sq mi). In the 1980s, urban growth from Damascus started replacing agricultural use with housing and industry, shrinking the green zone.

Before the Syrian Civil War, the area was home to about two million people, but in 2017 the population was estimated to be about 400,000.

==== Syrian Civil War ====
Since early in the civil war, civilians in Eastern Ghouta almost entirely sided with the opposition to Syria's government. During the civil unrest that began in Syria in March 2011, eastern Ghouta residents joined the protests against Syrian president Bashar al-Assad and joined the Syrian rebels, successfully expelling Syrian government forces by November 2012. In February 2013, Syrian rebels captured parts of the ring road on the edge of Damascus and entered the Jobar district of the capital city. Backed by Hezbollah, the Syrian Arab Army counterattacked and in May 2013 began a siege of Eastern Ghouta.

Ghouta was the location of the August 21st, 2013 Ghouta chemical attack, where the Syrian Government forces struck the towns of Irbin, Zamalka, and Ein Tarma within the Ghouta countryside with sarin, killing at least 1,000 people. It was the deadliest chemical attack during the Syrian civil war.

In mid-2017, the main rebel faction in the area was Jaysh al-Islam, based in Douma (with an estimated 10–15,000 fighters in the region in early 2018). The second largest was Faylaq al-Rahman, an official affiliate of the Free Syrian Army (FSA), controlling much of central and western parts of Ghouta, including the Jobar and Ain Terma districts. Ahrar al-Sham (based in Harasta) and Tahrir al-Sham (HTS - controlling smaller districts such as Arbin, Hawsh al-Ashari and Beit Nayim, with an estimated strength in the area of 500 in February 2018) had a far smaller presence.

The residents described the life under the Siege as "hell" to a Channel 4 correspondent as they were Under Barrel bomb bombardments, were prevented from leaving and had no water and electricity.

In February 2018, the Syrian army launched an operation to dislodge rebels from the area. In early March 2018, the Syrian army had captured 59% of the Eastern Ghouta pocket. On 7 April 2018, at least 48 people were reportedly killed in a chemical attack in Douma, which resulted in an armed response from the United States, France, and the United Kingdom. On 14 April 2018, the Syrian Army officially declared Eastern Ghouta to be free of militants, securing it under government control.

== See also ==
- Water resources management in Syria

== Bibliography ==
- Doumani, Beshara (8 June 2017). Family Life in the Ottoman Mediterranean: A Social History. Cambridge University Press. ISBN 978-0-521-76660-9.
- Elhadj, Elie (2006). Experiments in Achieving Water and Food Self-Sufficiency in the Middle East. Boca Raton. ISBN 1-58112-298-5.
- Grehan, James (2007). Everyday Life and Consumer Culture in Eighteenth-Century Damascus. Seattle: University of Washington Press. ISBN 978-0-295-98676-0.
- Heydemann, Steven (1999). Authoritarianism in Syria: Institutions and Social Conflict, 1946-1970. Cornell University Press. ISBN 978-0-8014-2932-3.
- Lehrman, Jonas (1980). Earthly Paradise: Garden and Courtyard in Islam. Berkeley and Los Angeles: University of California Press. ISBN 0-520-04363-4.
- Taylor, Malissa Anne. Fragrant Gardens and Converging Waters: Ottoman Governance in Seventeenth-Century Damascus (Thesis). Berkeley: University of California.
