= Kafr Batna =

Town in southern Syria

Kafr Batna كفر بطنا Kfar Batna
- Town
- Location within Syria
- Coordinates: 33°30′N 36°22′E
- Country: Syria
- Governorate: Rif Dimashq
- District: Markaz Rif Dimashq
- Subdistrict: Kafr Batna

Population (2004)
  - Total: 22,535
- Time zone: UTC+3 (EET)
  - Summer (DST): UTC+2 (EEST)

Kafr Batna (Arabic: كفر بطنا, also spelled Kfar Batna and Kafar Batna) is a town in the Rif Dimashq Governorate in southern Syria and a suburb of Damascus. It is approximately 4 kilometers (2.5 mi) east of the Bab Sharqi neighborhood. Kafr Batna had a population of 22,535 in 2004.

== History ==
Kafr Batna's name suggests it was previously an Aramaean village during the Iron Age.

During a Qaysi revolt against the Abbasid governor of Syria, Qaysi rebels led by Muhammad ibn Bayhas camped out in the town in 842 CE before proceeding to Damascus. There, they attracted the support of other villages in the Ghouta region which aided them in their failed insurrection. Yaqut al-Hamawi visited the town in 1226, during Ayyubid rule, and described it as "a village in the Ghautah of Damascus, in the Iklim (District) of Da'iyyah." He also noted that some members of the Umayyad family, which ruled Syria until 750, had lived in Kafr Batna.

The Ottoman Empire annexed Syria including Kafr Batna in the early 16th-century and continued to rule until 1918. By 1535, the settlement was home to 77 households and 6 bachelors. In the mid-18th-century, a prominent businessman and scholar from Hamah, Abd al-Qadir al-Kaylani, endowed large swathes of farmland property in Kafr Batna in a waqf (religious endowment) to be supervised by his wife al-Sharifa Rahmana. During the Ottoman period, a Sheikh Muhammad ibn Isa al-Qari' endowed a share of his vineyards in the town which was supervised by members of his family.

=== Syrian uprising ===
Some of Kafr Batna's inhabitants have participated on the side of the opposition during the Syrian uprising against the government in Syria. On 29 January 2012, Syrian Army tanks entered the suburb to force out rebels from the opposition Free Syrian Army (FSA) who were positioned there. Although it has not been verified, opposition activists reported that five FSA soldiers and 14 civilians, including at least one minor, were killed during the raid.

On 4 February 2013, it was reported that the suburb was taken over by the rebels as part of a large push into the capital

On 5 February 2018, the military launched airstrikes on the town. The attack killed 78 people, mostly civilians, including 19 children. On 17 March, the Syrian army captured Kafr Batna. Kafr Batna was recaptured by rebel forces in the 2024 Rebel Offensives and Fall of Damascus.

== Bibliography ==
- Burns, Ross (2005). Damascus: A History. London: Routledge. ISBN 0-415-27105-3..
- Cobb, Paul (2001). White banners: contention in ʻAbbāsid Syria, 750-880. SUNY Press. ISBN 0-7914-4879-7..
- Oriental Ceramic Society (1998). Transactions of the Oriental Ceramic Society. Vol. 63. Oriental Ceramic Society..
- Reilly, James A. (2002). A small town in Syria: Ottoman Hama in the eighteenth and nineteenth centuries. P. Lang. ISBN 0-8204-5606-3.
- le Strange, Guy (1890). Palestine Under the Moslems: A Description of Syria and the Holy Land from A.D. 650 to 1500. Committee of the Palestine Exploration Fund.
- El-Zawahreh, Taisir Khalil Muhammad (1995). Religious endowments and social life in the Ottoman province of Damascus in the sixteenth and seventeenth centuries. Publications of the Deanship of Research and Graduate Studies, Mu'tah University..
