= Rif Dimashq offensive (September 2015) =

Military operation

- Part of the Syrian Civil War and the Siege of eastern Ghouta
Date	11–27 September 2015 (2 weeks and 2 days)
Location	Eastern Ghouta, Rif Dimashq Governorate, Syria
Result	Partial Rebel victory
Territorial changes	Rebels capture Tell Kurdi and its industrial district, Harasta Central Military Security Branch and electrical station

Belligerents
UMCEG; Islamic Front; Free Syrian Army	(Syria) Syrian Arab Republic: Syrian Arab Armed Forces; National Defense Force; Palestine Liberation Army

Commanders and leaders
Zahran Alloush	Brig. Gen. Qassam Mahmoud Shehada †; Col. Mohamed Ali Zaatar †

Units involved
Jaysh al-Islam Al-Rahman Legion	Republican Guard: 105th Brigade; Qalamoun Shield Forces

Strength
Unknown	200 soldiers (reinforcements)

Casualties and losses
40+ killed (pro-gov claim)	71+ killed

The Rif Dimashq offensive (September 2015), or the battle of "Allah al-Ghalib", was a battle launched by Syrian rebels around Tall Kurdi, Adra and Harasta in Eastern Ghouta.

== The offensive ==
On 11 September, the Jaysh al-Islam grouping launched the offensive towards the Adra Prison and captured Tell Kurdi and two buildings in the Adra woman prison. 15 soldiers and at least nine rebels (including a leader and a spokesman) were killed during the fighting for Tell Kurdi.

By the next day, rebels had captured "significant amount of territory" near the Adra prison and Harasta National Hospital. They also pushed into the town of Dhahiyat Al-Assad, but were reportedly pushed back by the National Defence Forces (NDF). Around 200 men of the 105th Brigade of the Republican Guard were brought in as reinforcements to recapture two hills overlooking Dhahiyat Al-Assad.

On 13 September, rebels advanced deep inside the town of Harasta and captured the Military Security Branch, Electrical stations and Petrol Stations, while they also captured the Tal Kurdi Industrial District. The Army reportedly recaptured Tell Talet Raas Abou Za’id and positions along the Damascus-Homs International Highway. According to the SOHR, 38 rebels and at least 41 soldiers (including two brigadier generals) were killed since the offensive started. At the end of the day, Jaysh al-Islam announced to have completed the first phase of its offensive.

On 14 September, 11 rebels were killed around Dhahiyat Al-Assad.

On 17 September, the Syrian Army reportedly captured Abou Zayd Hill near the Homs-Damascus highway located in Harasta.

On 21 September, the Republican Guard, assisted by the PLA and NDF, advanced from Abu Zayd and captured the village of Al-Kassarat. Pro-government Al-Masdar news claimed that the SAA had hence secured Dhahiyat Al-Assad area, reversing much of the initial rebel gains.

On 22 September, the Republican Guard attacked the town of Jisreen, capturing the plum farm after killing 30 rebels. Meanwhile, Jaysh Al-Islam's attack on the south of Adra Industry City was repelled by the NDF. Intense SyAAF airstrikes on Duma were also reported.

On 25 September, a pro-government source reported the Army captured a series of hills overlooking Harasta. The firefight killed 17 rebels and unknown number of soldiers. Two days later, government forces reportedly recaptured large parts of the Harasta Industrial Area.

== Aftermath ==
On October 18, the SAA advanced in the Harasta Construction Site and the northern farms of the town.
