= Islamic Coalition (Syria) =

Coalition of Syrian Sunni Islamist rebel groups

Islamic coalition
- Arabic: التحالف الاسلامي
- Dates active: September 2013 – January 2014
- Active regions: Syria
- Ideology: Sunni Islamism
- Wars: the Syrian Civil War

The coalition referred to as the Islamic coalition or Islamic alliance (Arabic: التحالف الاسلامي, 'al-tahaluf al-islami') was founded in September 2013 in Syria in the context of the Syrian Civil War. It was founded in opposition to the National Coalition for Syrian Revolutionary and Opposition Forces (SNC), and initially included 13 Sunni Islamist groups, including the Tawhid Brigade, Islam Brigade, and Suqour al-Sham Brigade, three members of the Supreme Military Council, which was considered the SNC's military wing. The groups stressed that they remained supportive of Salim Idris' SMC - they were abandoning only the political coalition, saying it "does not represent us." Other members included al-Nusra Front, part of al-Qaeda, and Ahrar ash-Sham. The Islamic State of Iraq and the Levant was not a member, but its joining was not ruled out.

In its founding statement, titled "Communique No. 1," the group rejected the "interim prime minister" Ahmad Tu'mah, elected by the SNC 10 days earlier, and called for "an Islamic framework based on Sharia as the sole source of legislation." A spokesman for the Tawhid Brigade said that there is no common organization between the groups. Aymenn Jawad Al-Tamimi also said that there was no formal coalition, and Nusra's participation merely amounted to one of its local representatives signing the joint statement in Aleppo. The founding of the coalition took place in the context of attempts to launch the Geneva II Middle East peace conference.

== History ==
Members of the coalition were affiliated with the Aleppo Sharia Committee, another Sunni Islamist alliance. In September 2013, ISIL attacked the Northern Storm Brigade in Azaz. In response, the coalition condemned Northern Storm as a "criminal organization" at the end of September, but released statement on 3 October calling for reconciliation between the two groups. After the clashes, Northern Storm declared its support for the Islamic Coalition and stated that its goal has always been Sharia.

The coalition quickly fell apart. In November 2013, Islamic coalition signatories Ahrar ash-Sham, Liwa al-Tawhid, Suqour al-Sham, Liwa al-Islam, and Liwa al-Haqq went on to join in the Islamic Front coalition. In January 2014 signatories Nour al-Din al-Zinki Islamic Battalions, 19th Division, which included the Ansar Brigade, Fastqaim Kama Umirt Gathering, and Nour Movement united in the Army of Mujahideen.

== Members ==
Reuters listed the 13 groups as

- Al-Nusra Front
- Ahrar ash-Sham
- Liwa al-Haq
- Harakat Fajr ash-Sham al-Islamiya
- Harakat al-Nour al-Islamiya
- Liwa al-Islam
- Suqour al-Sham Brigade
- Tawhid Brigade
- Nour al-Din al-Zinki Islamic Battalions
- Criterion Brigades
- Fastaqim Kama Umirt Gathering
- 19th Division

== See also ==
- List of armed groups in the Syrian Civil War
