= Second Battle of al-Qusayr =

2013 military operation

Coordinates: 34.5119°N 36.5764°E

- Part of the Syrian civil war and the Al-Qusayr offensive
Date	19 May – 5 June 2013 (2 weeks and 3 days)
Location	Al-Qusayr and its district, Syria
Result	Decisive Syrian Army & Hezbollah victory

Belligerents
(Syrian opposition) Free Syrian Army; Syrian Islamic Liberation Front; Syrian Islamic Front; Al-Nusra Front; Ahrar al-Sham	(Syria) Syrian Arab Republic; Hezbollah

Commanders and leaders
Lt. Col. Mohieddin al-Zain (al-Qusayr military council); Abu Omar † (top Al-Nusra Front commander); Abdul Qader Saleh (WIA) (Al-Tawhid Brigade commander); Mahmoud Mohammed Ammar † (Al Mughaouirs Brigade commander); Bilal Idris † (Farouq Battalion commander); Nawaf Alwani † (Al Nusra Front commander); Bakr Saleh Mustapha † (Kassioune Brigade commander); Abul-Baraa (al-Nusra front 'Emir')	Abu Jihad (Hezbollah commander); Fadi al-Jazar † (Hezbollah commander); Mustafa Badreddine

Units involved
15 rebel units	Syrian Armed Forces; Syrian Army; 1st Armoured Division; 10th Mechanised Division; National Defense Forces; Popular Committees; Unit 910 (Hezbollah)

Strength
1,900 fighters	5,000–6,000 soldiers 1,700–2,000 Hezbollah fighters

Casualties and losses
430–500+ killed, 1,000 wounded (opposition claim); 1,257 killed, 1,192 wounded, 1,000 captured (government claim)	110-120 Hezbollah fighters, 23 soldiers and militiamen and 8 Iranian officers killed, 200 Hezbollah fighters wounded
- 47 civilians killed and 500 wounded

The Second Battle of al-Qusayr started on 19 May 2013, as part of the larger al-Qusayr offensive, launched in early April 2013 by the Syrian Army and the Lebanese militia Hezbollah, during the Syrian civil war, with the aim of capturing the villages around the rebel-held town of al-Qusayr and ultimately launching an attack on the town itself. The region was strategically important as a supply route for rebels fighting Syrian government forces in Homs and also for the Syrian government, as it lies between the capital, Damascus, and the Syrian coast, a stronghold for Assad supporters.

Prior to the offensive, the Syrian Air Force dropped leaflets over the town warning that government forces were going to attack the city. This led to thousands of civilians fleeing, though 25,000 residents stayed. Free Syrian Army (FSA) General Salim Idris warned of a "massacre" if the Syrian Army and Hezbollah were to take the town.

During the final days of the battle Hezbollah forces and rebels negotiated a withdrawal plan, in which the rebels and civilians could evacuate the town through a narrow corridor without being attacked. On 5 June, after two weeks of fighting, the Syrian Army and Hezbollah regained control of al-Qusayr as the last rebel contingents retreated. One observer described the battle as the "defining battle of the country's civil war."

== The battle ==
=== First week ===
US Army report on the battle.

On 19 May, after two days of calm, planes, artillery and mortars bombarded al-Qusayr in the early hours of the morning killing 20 people, including 11 rebels. Later in the day, government troops, backed-up by hundreds of Hezbollah militiamen, stormed the city from several directions. Fierce fighting raged around the entrances to the town. Helicopters were seen bombing a heavily damaged neighbourhood in video uploaded onto the Web. Clashes at nine points in and around al-Qusayr were reported during the day.

Syrian troops entered the center of the city later in the day, seizing the town's main square and its municipality building, a military source said. One opposition activist denied that government forces made gains and stated that the municipality building had already been destroyed six months earlier. He also reported that 17 houses had been destroyed in the early morning bombardment. However, another opposition activist at the end of the day confirmed the Army had captured the municipality building and were in control of 60% of the city.

Government troops had attacked from the south, east and northeast. According to one soldier, after fierce fighting they quickly seized the southern part of town, the town hall and nearby buildings, and advanced on the western outskirts. During the operation, troops had to defuse mines and bombs placed by rebels at the entrances to the city. The attack appeared to surprise the rebels, who expected the Army to push via the north by attacking several rebel-controlled villages before attacking the city itself. Hezbollah fighters had descended on the city from the Al Tal area, west of the Assi river, which has an overlooking position over al-Qusayr. Several rebel fighters accused some commanders of fleeing the Al Tal area after they bought their way out of al-Qusayr at the last moment before the assault on the city started. Many fighters reportedly managed to break the siege by escaping through a secret route towards Josiah and the Qalamoun Mountains to the south. However, government troops apparently found out about the escape route nearly a week before and blocked it, killing and injuring around 30 fighters. According to the FSA, the commander of Hezbollah's forces leading the battle in al-Qusayr is Mustafa Badreddine, who is accused of involvement in former Lebanese premier Rafik Hariri's murder. "It has been confirmed that Mustafa Badreddine is present on Qusayr's front where he is leading Hizbullah's operations", said a statement issued by the FSA.

A Hezbollah fighter reported that their forces managed to clear two-thirds of the city and were moving towards the northern section of al-Qusayr when they were attacked from behind by rebel fighters, which they had not previously seen. At that point they suffered a lot of casualties, most of them shot in the back.

Later, in an analysis by AP, it was determined that government forces had captured more than half the city within hours of the start of the battle, primarily the southern and eastern parts of al-Qusayr. Rebels remained entrenched in the northern and western parts of the town.

By the second day of the battle, state media claimed they had restored "stability" in the town's east, and was still hunting "remnants of terrorists" in some northern and eastern areas. The areas listed by them as coming under Army control were: "The local stadium area; some parts of the western area, municipality HQ, the cultural centre, the Church, al-Baladyeh roundabout and al-Ghytta area." An opposition source also reported the fighting to be concentrated in the northern part of the city.

SOHR reported the Army surrounded the village of al-Dab'a, north of the city. SOHR said there were conflicting reports as to whether or not the Syrian army was fighting inside al-Qusayr city, but had reports which confirmed that they were gathering near the western neighborhood of al-Qusayr "in order to lay siege on the city itself". Thick black smoke could also be seen from the direction of that air base, north of the city, as government troops fought to retake the facility.

An activist claimed that government and Hezbollah forces had been pushed back to their starting positions on the outskirts of the city, while an FSA spokesman claimed that the government force's efforts to enter the city were being blocked by the FSA, and accused the Syrian army of using a scorched-earth policy during the battle. At the same time, another opposition activist once again reaffirmed that government forces had captured the municipality building and the city center and had pushed out rebel units out of most of al-Qusayr. An Al Jazeera reporter in Beirut also said that it seemed that the Army had control of most of the town.

On the third day of the fighting, elite Hezbollah reinforcements were sent from Lebanon across the border to al-Qusayr. SOHR reported that much of the town had been destroyed by this point. SOHR had also confirmed, for itself, for the first time that fighting was raging in the city itself. Hezbollah fighters were no longer being used as conventional soldiers, instead they are breaking up into small groups and being used in a "guerrilla warfare" role against the rebels for which they were trained.

A US State Department official, citing multiple rebel sources, claimed that Iranian soldiers were involved in the battle for al-Qusayr, whether they are fighting or not remains unclear.

On 22 May, George Sabra, president of the SNC, issued a call for reinforcements to be sent to al-Quasyr stating "Everyone who has weapons or ammunition should send them to Qusair and Homs to strengthen its resistance". The Islamic Tawheed Brigade reportedly sent a convoy of 30 vehicles to al-Quasyr from Aleppo. Later, Abu Firas of the Tawid brigade claimed that a total of 300 support units arrived in al-Qusayr, adding that they also sent an ambulance, an antiaircraft weapon and ammunition. SOHR reported that rebel reinforcements from the town of Ind Shamseen, who were trying to reach al-Qusayr, were ambushed by government forces and two rebels were killed. Days later, an opposition activist denied any reinforcements had arrived in al-Qusayr, stating that "No one is helping Qusair other than its own men".

One rebel source said government and Hezbollah forces had cut most of the oppositions overland supply lines into al-Qusayr and some others reaffirmed that they believe government troops had captured about 60 percent of the city, while a government official claimed they controlled up to 80 percent of the city. Rebel sources reported the Army was holding 40% of the city, with opposition forces still in control of the central and western part of al-Qusayr.

Government troops were advancing cautiously amid heavy fighting which largely destroyed the city. Morale among Army personnel was reportedly high as "news broke" about the killing of al-Nusra Front commander Abu Omar. Military commanders on the ground said that the battle for Qusayr is far from over and it could take one more week to retake the northern part of al-Qusayr where rebels were entrenched. Meanwhile, opposition forces were still holding the al-Dabaa air base. It was reported that the Army had discovered rebel tunnels linking areas around the town. Morale was also high among Hezbollah fighters, despite losing a large number of men.

On 24 May, rebels launched a counter-attack in which they claimed to have recaptured three posts from the Syrian Army and Hezbollah fighters. SOHR reported that two rebels were killed. Rebel forces in al-Qusayr were joined by the 'cannibal' commander, Abu Sakkar, who became notorious after appearing in a video in which he ate the heart of a dead government soldier. It was also reported, according to pro-government sources, that Army forces were advancing in the nearby town of Hamidiya, in an attempt to cut the opposition forces' last supply line into al-Qusayr. Opposition sources denied this with an FSA major claiming the attack on the city via Hamidiya was repulsed. However, SOHR said that fighting in Hamidiya was still ongoing.

An AFP journalist said the eastern part of the city was transformed into a military barracks. A military officer told the journalist that the Army was in the penultimate phase of the battle. According to SOHR, the Army and Hezbollah were encircling and bombing the rebels in the northern part of the town, into which government forces were squeezing opposition fighters, as stated by a military officer. Another officer stated that the rebels were confined in a triangle linking Arjun, al-Dabaa and the northern part of al-Qusayr. A large force of rebels had retreated to the al-Dabaa air base. The approach of the Army was described as being slow and methodical, taking over small bit of ground from rebels and consolidating it before advancing again. Very few reinforcements reached the rebels, due to the control of surrounding roads by the government. This was reaffirmed when one opposition activist in fact said that no reinforcements had arrived into al-Qusayr at all.

At daybreak on 25 May, the Army unleashed the heaviest shelling since the start of the battle with barrages of rockets and tank shells hitting al-Qusayr and the surrounding rebel areas, specifically Hamdiyeh and the al-Dabaa airbase to the north. The barrage lasted for six to seven hours with an average of 40 shells per minute hitting the town. Government forces also fired two surface to surface missiles during the bombardment. According to military sources and state media, the Army launched a three-pronged attack on the town which was advancing well and resulting in heavy losses for the rebels. A Hezbollah fighter told Reuters that the attack was advancing slowly due to rebel efforts at mining the town, with the fighter saying "Even the refrigerators are mined."

Government and Hezbollah forces had also reportedly breached rebel defence lines at the al-Dabaa air base from the northwest and entered the facility where fighting was ongoing, according to the Army. SOHR reported that the fighting was taking place around the base, while rebels were still maintaining control of it, though it was being heavily shelled by government forces. Among the weapons being used were also multiple rocket launchers.

SOHR said "the intensification of the fighting can be explained by Hezbollah's desire to score points before the speech their leader Hassan Nasrallah is due to deliver this evening", marking the 13th anniversary of Israel's withdrawal from Lebanon. The Syrian rebels have repeatedly warned that they will hit Hezbollah targets on Lebanese territory if the latter does not withdraw from Syria and have called on the Lebanese government to put a stop to Hezbollah intervention.

According to SOHR's head Rami Abdul Rahman, it was their belief that government forces were in control of much of the city and were intensifying their attacks on the air base, despite rebel claims of being able to repel Army and Hezbollah attacks on al-Qusayr. A Hezbollah source said, at this point, Army and Hezbollah forces were in control of 80 percent of the city after capturing 10 percent during the day. He also claimed that the road between Baalbek in Lebanon and Homs city was secured.

=== Second week ===
On 27 May, Yara Abbas, a Syrian female TV reporter was killed by rebel sniper fire while covering the fighting at the air base, north of al-Qusayr.

Army and Hezbollah troops captured the town of Hamidiya after heavy clashes. The fighting than shifted to the village of Haret al-Turkumen, which the Army was trying to capture in order to put al-Qusayr under "complete siege". An opposition activist said that government forces had captured two-thirds of the city, while another activist said the Army was preventing rebel reinforcements from reaching al-Qusayr. The reinforcements, who were trying to relieve the pressure on al-Qusayr, were bogged down on the outskirts of the city and one activist said the following about them, "So far they are just fighting and dying, their assault hasn't resulted in much yet unfortunately".

On 28 May, recent videos posted by rebels suggested that Hezbollah's and the Syrian Army's forces were tied up in the eastern part of the city and on the outskirts. A rebel spokesman from within the city claimed government forces captured 20% of the city, consisting of the security buildings in the eastern part, while rebels were holding the rest. The spokesperson added that for the first time a gap in Hezbollah's encirclement of the town had opened up, allowing them to evacuate several hundred non-combatants.

Rami Abdul Rahman of SOHR told Al Jazeera the latest reinforcements "indicate that the regime is gearing for a major offensive on neighborhoods in the north and west of the town still under rebel control."

Top rebel general Salim Idris stated that if the European Union did not provide new weapons shipments to the opposition forces his fighters could lose control of al-Qusayr in the coming days and said rebel forces in the city were outnumbered by more than 3 to 1.

On 29 May, Syrian Air Force launched six air raids against sections of the town still controlled by the rebels. The government has reinforced the assault on the town with elite Republican Guards and Hezbollah has committed extra fighters. In what, according to SOHR, appears to be the beginning of a major assault on the town. Lebanese Sunni fighters are also reported as having crossed the border into Syrian to fight alongside the rebels in Qusayr. A convoy of up to 40 tanks and 40 technicals was seen heading to Qusayr from Damascus, though with rebels trying to block the convoy. Meanwhile, air strikes were conducted against a convoy of rebel vehicles trying to reach the city, killing eight rebels.

A rebel doctor reported four incidents involving the deployment of chemicals that "made breathing difficult." Government forces had launched 10 air strikes on Qusayr and the nearby villages of Hamidiya. Three missiles were also fired at Qusayr which could, according to one fighter, "bring down a whole street."

State media reported that government troops had captured the air base after five hours of fighting in and around it. Hezbollah's Manar TV aired footage, relayed from its TV crew embedded with government troops, of tanks being deployed inside the air base and soldiers walking around empty hangars. Syrian Army forces were then reportedly advancing on the nearby town of Dabaa. SOHR and a spokesman for the rebel Farouq Battalions confirmed the capture of the air base the next day. A Hezbollah fighter, who left the battle four days prior but stayed in touch with developments and was expected to return, said the group had cleared rebels from most of al-Qusayr and the Farouq spokesman confirmed the assertion. He was quoted as saying, "We have suffered heavy losses". According to the Hezbollah member, the city was divided on a grid into 16 squares, of which they had captured 13.

On 30 May, rebels confirmed that al-Qusayr was totally surrounded as they were unable to evacuate their wounded who reportedly numbered 700, 100 of whom were on oxygen. They requested medical and military aid. A rebel statement was issued saying that "If all rebel fronts do not move to stop this crime ... we will soon be saying that there was once a city called Qusair". Several YouTube videos showed that some brigades of rebel reinforcements made it to the outskirts of the town but failed, as with previous efforts, to enter al-Qusayr. Artillery shells were landing every minute on the city, while Syrian Army and Hezbollah forces seemed to be advancing more quickly after seizing the nearby air base.

SOHR reported clashes near the villages of Shamsi and A'rjoun villages. Later, state media said that government troops had captured A'rjoun, thus leaving rebels in a situation with little chance of escaping from the northern part of al-Qusayr. Reuters also reported on the capture of the village, which is six kilometers to the northwest of the city.

On 31 May, George Sabra claimed that over 1,000 rebel fighters moved into al-Qusayr to join those fighting in the town even though it remained completely encircled by Hezbollah and government forces. However, SOHR and an opposition activist inside the city stated the number was far fewer than 1,000, instead they were numbering just several hundred fighters. The next day, rebel Gen. Idris stated that, in all, 300 rebels managed to reinforce al-Qusayr. 11 rebels were killed during the attempt to break through Army lines near the village of Shamsinn. Al-Tawhid Brigade announced on its Facebook page that it had sent "hundreds" of fighters through army lines to the north-east of al-Qusayr. It remained unclear whether or not the fresh influx of rebel fighters was enough to help the opposition regain some lost ground, according to SOHR. Idris stated that rebels in the city were "heavily outgunned and overwhelmed" by government forces and warned of defeat if the West did not react to help them. A doctor north of al-Qusayr claimed that rebels were holding 80 percent of the city, although this could not be independently verified, while Reuters said that government forces had captured two-thirds of the city, but that rebels were still holding out in the central part of al-Qusayr.

Idris claimed that more than 7,000 Hezbollah fighters were near al-Qusayr. Although that claim seemed unlikely because that would involve most of Hezbollah's military wing and they would be pulling their troops from the southern Lebanon border with Israel. A doctor in the town reported as seeing "many" bodies of Hezbollah fighters. A doctor, Muhammad al-Muhammad, stated that the involvement of Hezbollah "definitely changed the game" as other sides have been drained by two years of fighting.

The Syrian Army attacked a convoy trying to remove injured people from the town killing 7–9 and wounding 80. 15,000 civilians remained trapped in the town with food and water running low. Civilians had to wait 3–4 days for drinking water. Some civilians were able to get out but they have had to pay "enormous bribes" to get out of the town. A doctor, based north of al-Qusayr, described how the FSA were "just unable to control the situation here". He also said, "The battle is getting bad. There are kids and women that are dying in the battle for more control." A Hezbollah commander claimed that the tactics and weapons used against them were the same as those that Hezbollah used in the past.

Later during the day, state TV reported that government troops captured the village of Jawadiyeh outside al-Qusayr, closing all entrances leading to the town and tightening the government's siege. The capture was confirmed by SOHR.

On 1 June, rebels tried to launch an attack against the al-Dabaa air base, while clashes occurred in Dabaa village. At least 15 government tanks were seen massing at points north of the town including the airport and Jawadiya.

=== Third week ===
On 2 June, the Syrian Air Force launched six air raids against rebel-held parts of the town, according to activists. The International Red Cross asked for a cease-fire to allow for the evacuation of wounded and civilians. If possible, to also allow aid in for the civilians who remained behind. A number of UN agencies also expressed concern about the civilians in the town. UN High Commissioner for Human Rights Navi Pillay stated there was "an urgent need of immediate evacuation for emergency medical treatment". The UN Security Council debated a draft motion that mentioned "grave concern about the situation in Qusayr ... [and] the impact on civilians of the ongoing fighting". Russia vetoed the motion on the basis that the UN Security Council "did not speak out when the rebels seized the town in 2012". The UN believes that 1,500 wounded needed immediate emergency evacuation. According to AP, wounded are treated in private homes after the main hospital was destroyed and a previous evacuation effort foundered after a convoy was attacked killing 13 of the wounded. Meanwhile, more government reinforcements were reportedly continuing to flow towards their lines. The Syrian government confirmed that it will allow the International Red Cross access to the town however only "immediately after the end of military operations", stated Syrian Foreign Minister Walid Muallem.

According to an opposition activist, Hezbollah forces cut off running water in the city after they captured the water station. Hezbollah introduced a change to its rotation policy for its fighters in al-Qusayr from 7 days of fighting followed by 7 days leave, increasing it to 20 days fighting and then 7 days leave. Rebels also attempted diversionary raids on government positions north of Homs city, near Rastan, but they were beaten back with heavy losses such as in the Alawite town of Kafr Nan where 28 rebels were killed. Rebels were trying to create a second front by launching probing attacks.

On 3 June, rebel activists claimed a new attempt to advance by government forces was repulsed, resulting in the destruction of three tanks and the death of "dozens" of government soldiers. Rebel commander Col. Abduljabbar Akidi, head of the Aleppo Military Council, managed to infiltrate the city and Abdulqader Saleh, commander of the Tawhid Brigade, was en route to the town. Three surface-to-surface missiles were fired at the town by government troops. Fighting was still ongoing in the village of Dabaa, which was largely government-controlled, and the rebel-controlled village of Jouadiyah. Activists reaffirmed government control of the villages of Borak and Arjoun.

The number of injured who need medical assistance has risen to 1,000 according to a doctor, Kassem Al Zein, in the town. He further claimed that more than 200 had been killed and there was no time to bury the deceased leading to a terrible smell in the town. The doctor asked for outside assistance from humanitarian agencies claiming that "We have lost everything." Those in Qusayr have not attempted another convoy to evacuate the wounded due to the previous convoy being attacked resulting in the death of 13 of people who were already seriously injured. At least 300 seriously wounded locals need medical evacuation. The main hospital was destroyed several days ago and now the wounded are being treated in private homes. There is no more oxygen, and they are running out of antibiotics, bandages and anesthetics blood also needs to be donated more than once a day because no working refrigerators exist to keep blood in a usable state.

Government and Hezbollah forces were advancing and getting closer to a makeshift hospital in the center of the city, which replaced the city's main hospital after it was destroyed early in the battle. Government troops had built platforms on the Orontes river to quicken the movement of their troops. According to one rebel, it was their view that the Army and Hezbollah were going to make an attempt to storm the remaining rebel stronghold of northern al-Qusayr at the end of the week. At the end of the day, Lebanon's al-Manar TV, owned by Hezbollah, reported government forces had captured the south-western parts of the town. Heavy government shelling forced rebels to retreat from parts of Al-Qusayr, according to a rebel commander, Oraba Idris, and had captured as much as 50% of the city. SOHR also reported that government troops captured the local government building in the city center.

The Syrian Army regained control of the city on 5 June. The rebels stated that they had pulled out of the city. One Hezbollah fighter said that they took the town in a rapid overnight offensive, allowing some of the rebels to retreat. A source close to the Syrian military said that the Army was carrying out mop-up operations in the northern quarter of al-Qusayr. The rebels had reportedly retreated north to the village of Dabaa, which was still partially under rebel control.

The rebel retreat, on the evening of 4 June, was reportedly part of an informal understanding that they would be allowed safe passage by the government forces. That enabled the Army and Hezbollah to advance into the city without resistance the next morning.

On 6 June, government forces continued attacking the rebel-controlled villages of Dabaa and Eastern Bweida in which at least 15 rebels were killed, according to SOHR. Mopping-up operations dealing with the "final pockets" of rebels were still occurring in al-Qusayr.

Rebel commander Colonel Abdul Jabbar al-Oqaidi, who was leading a convoy of reinforcements from Aleppo to Qusayr, commented that the firepower used by the Syrian government "was overwhelming. I never saw such a thing in my life."

== Casualties ==
According to opposition sources between 431 and 500+ rebels were killed and 1,000 were wounded. According to the Syrian government, 1,257 rebels were killed, 1,192 were wounded and 1,000 were captured. Foreign rebel fighters were killed as well, including 30 Lebanese, six Palestinians and one Bahraini. Many rebel commanders were also among the dead. 114 Hezbollah fighters were killed in the fighting, 100 of them by day 11 of the battle. Among the Hezbollah members killed was commander Fadi al-Jazar, as well as Hezbollah leader's brother Khader Nasrallah. 12 government soldiers and militiamen were reported killed on the first day of the battle and another 11 were killed and 25 wounded during the last day.

Refugees who fled to Arsal in Lebanon, later described their ordeal to be horrific. Several accounts were recorded mentioning the cases of families being killed by Hezbollah forces, and their money and possessions stolen. A number of testimonies indicated targeting of families by government forces who refused to leave their homes.

== Strategic significance ==
The battle for Qusayr was considered by both sides in the conflict to be critical. For the Syrian government and Hezbollah, the capture of al-Qusayr allowed the Syrian government to link Homs to Damascus, reinforcing Homs and connecting Army forces to the Mediterranean coast and the port of Tartous. For Hezbollah this was about protecting their assets and supporters in Lebanon from rebel attacks. For the rebels, al-Qusayr was a major supply route for both supplies from Lebanon and Lebanese Sunni fighters who cross the border to fight alongside the rebels in Syria. In the past rebels also used this route to cross into Lebanon to avoid government forces, and used Lebanon as a base to trade fire with government soldiers.

Rebels managed to hold on to portions of al-Qusayr for three weeks, when the government expected to crush them "in days". However, the government had more forces at its disposal, particularly given the clear support of Hezbollah in the battle. Government forces used artillery, surface-to-surface missiles and the Syrian Air Force to attack the town, and were able to replace forces that became fatigued with fresh reinforcements.

Rebel forces initially had time to prepare extensive defenses such as underground bunkers, booby traps and sniper positions. However, rebels were forced to divert forces from Aleppo to assist the local fighters. It was feared that the diversion of rebel forces from Aleppo to al-Qusayr may lead to a weakening of rebel positions in Aleppo.

Hezbollah appeared to commit 2,000 fighters to Aleppo, with their commander promising "to go after strongholds where they think they are safe. They are going to fall like dominoes."

== Reactions ==
- Iran - In an official statement, the Iranian government congratulated the Syrian people for their victory.
