= Islamic Front =

Islamic Front may refer to:

- Islamic Front (Syria), a merger of Syrian rebel groups
- Syrian Islamic Front, former Syrian rebel group, replaced by the Islamic Front
- Somali Islamic Front, another name for Jabhatul Islamiya, a Somali insurgent group
