= Dahiyat Harasta =

Dahiyat AlSham ضاحية الشام
- Interactive map of Dahiyat AlSham
- Location in Syria
- Coordinates: 33°34′52″N 36°21′36″E
- Country: Syria
- Governorate: Rif Dimashq
- District: Douma
- Subdistrict: Harasta

Population (2004 census)
  - Total: 9,858

Dahiyat AlSham (Arabic: ضاحية الشام, lit. 'AlSham Suburb') is a suburb in southern Syria, administratively part of the Rif Dimashq Governorate, located northeast of Damascus, near Harasta in Eastern Ghouta. Formerly, it was known as Dahiyat al-Assad.

== History ==
The suburb was established in 1982 by Hafez al-Assad to house Syrian Arab Army officers and their families.

On 4 September 2015, the Syrian Observatory for Human Rights reported that dozens of shells landed on Dahiyat al-Assad, information reported casualties. The clashes took place between the regime forces and allied militiamen against the rebel and Islamist factions.

On 10 September 2015, non-State armed opposition groups made advances from Eastern Ghouta towards Tall al-Kurdi and reached positions close to Adra Prison and Dahiyat al-Assad. Around 15,000 civilians were temporarily displaced from Dahiyat al-Assad and surrounding areas as a result. Government forces subsequently halted the advances in Dahiyat al-Assad.

On 12 September 2015, rebels pushed into the town of Dahiyat al-Assad, but were reportedly pushed back by the National Defence Forces (NDF). Around 200 men of the 105th Brigade of the Republican Guard were brought in as reinforcements to recapture two hills overlooking Dahiyat al-Assad.

== See also ==
- Rif Dimashq offensive (September 2015)
