= Islamic coalition =

Islamic coalition may refer to:

- Islamic coalition (Syria), a Syrian rebel coalition
- Islamic Military Alliance to fight terrorism
