= Battle of Azaz =

Battle of Azaz may refer to:

- Battle of Azaz (1030), a battle between the Mirdasids of Aleppo and the Byzantines
- Battle of Azaz (1125), a battle between the Crusaders and the Seljuk Turks and other Muslims
- Battle of Azaz (2012), a battle of the Syrian uprising

== See also ==
- Azaz
