= 70th Division (Syria) =

- Active: 2025 – present
- Country: Syria
- Branch: Syrian Army
- Garrison/HQ: Rif Dimashq
- Equipment: Small arms, light vehicles
- Engagements: Druze insurgency in Southern Syria (2025–present); Southern Syria clashes (July 2025)

Commanders
- Current commander: Issam Bouidani

The 70th Division of the Syrian Army was established in 2025 as part of the post-Assad military reorganization, under the Syrian transitional government. It is responsible for the eastern Rif Dimashq region in southern Syria. Its forces are mainly composed of former fighters from Jaysh al-Islam, a militant organisation combining an Islamist-Salafi outlook with Syrian nationalism, which operated in Rif Dimashq in the early stages of the Syrian civil war, but was later forced to Aleppo where it operated under Turkish supervision. In addition, the 70th Division contained elements of the US-backed Syrian Free Army that had been based at Al-Tanf base, later transferred to the Ministry of Interior.

== History ==
=== Background ===
After the fall of the Assad regime, Jaysh al-Islam was integrated into the Syrian defense apparatus, however it is unclear how many of its 5,000–8,000 fighters actually joined the division.

=== Operational history ===
The division took part in the clashes against Druze militias in Suwayda in July 2025, and may have suffered several casualties.

== Structure ==
The division is headed by Issam Bouidani, who has been a commander within Jaysh al-Islam previously. In April 2025, Bouidani was arrested during a visit to the UAE, reportedly following an Interpol request. As of early July, he remains in detention, and it is unclear whether a successor has been appointed. Other high-ranking members include Chief of Staff Ali Abd al-Baqi, who previously held the same position within Jaysh al-Islam.

The division controls at least three subordinate brigades:

- 72nd Brigade (led by Yusuf al-Ghazawi (Abu Mahmoud))
- 76th Brigade (led by Dirar Muhammad al-Hyashan (Abu Yazan), who was a senior commander in the Syrian National Army (SNA))
- 113th Brigade (led by Ahmad Bakri Pasha (Abu Jamil))
