= Liwa al-Haqq =

Liwa al-Haqq may refer to:

- Liwa al-Haqq (Homs), an armed Islamist insurgent group active during the Syrian Civil War
- Liwa al-Haqq (Idlib), a group active during the Syrian Civil War
