= Kurdish Islamic Front =

Syrian kurdish islamist rebel group

- پێشەوەى كوردى ئیسلامی
- Leader: Abu Abdullah al-Kurdi
- Dates active: 22 November 2013–8 December 2014
- Ideology: Kurdish Islamism; Salafism; Jihadism (until 2014)
- Size: Unknown
- Part of: Syrian Islamic Front; Islamic Front
- Wars: the Syrian civil war

The Kurdish Islamic Front (Kurdish: پێشەوەى كوردى ئیسلامی) was a small Kurdish Islamist armed group founded by Salahuddin al-Kurdi who also served as the group's spokesman and Abu Abdullah al-Kurdi in 2013, operating mainly in eastern Aleppo around al-Bab, the northern parts of the Raqqa Governorate, and the Hasakah Governorate. It fought during the Syrian Civil War and was opposed to the secular Syrian Kurdish government and groups, including those with common goals. The group dissolved and joined Ahrar al-Sham by the end of 2014.

== History ==
The group was established on 22 November 2013 by Salaheddin al-Kurdi and Abu Abdullah al-Kurdi, who was an Islamist activist from Afrin in the northwestern region of Syria's Aleppo Governorate, bordering Turkey, and at the time under YPG control. The group became part of the Islamic Front, which was a coalition of other groups which include Ahrar al-Sham, Jaysh al-Islam and others. During the group's existence, they fought alongside other Syrian rebel groups against the Syrian government and the AANES. Salahuddin al-Kurdi stated that the group's main aims were to overthrow the AANES and get rid of the multicultural, secular, and democratic rule and instead establish Sharia rule led by Kurdish Muslims. Abu Abdullah al-Kurdi also stated that the group was established with support from Ahrar al-Sham as a common enemy against YPG and to help diversify the Syrian opposition. The group ran Islamic schools for Kurdish children in Aleppo.

On 30 December 2013, the group's spokesman Salaheddin al-Kurdi said during an interview that Islamic rule would guarantee Kurdish rights and that defending Syria's Kurdish population was the main goal of the group, also saying that their rival Kurdish groups in Syria did not truly care for Kurdish interests. He also explained that the group has a presence across Kurdish populated areas of northern Syria spanning from al-Bab to Qamishli and Tell Abyad that they had taken from YPG. In December 2014, the Kurdish Islamic Front fully merged with Ahrar al-Sham.

== See also ==
- List of armed groups in the Syrian Civil War
