= Majdi Nema =

- مجدي نعمة
- Born: Majdi Mustafa Nema; 1988 (age 37–38); Syria
- Other name: Islam Alloush (former nom de guerre)
- Citizenship: Syrian
- Education: Istanbul Aydın University (BA); Eötvös Loránd University (Erasmus Programme); Aix-Marseille University (IREMAM)
- Occupations: Political science researcher, former media spokesperson
- Known for: Former spokesperson for Jaysh al-Islam, political science researcher, universal jurisdiction trial in France

Majdi Mustafa Nema (Arabic: مجدي مصطفى نعمة; born 1988), widely known by his former nom de guerre Islam Alloush, is a Syrian political science researcher and former media activist. He served as the official spokesperson for the Syrian rebel coalition Jaysh al-Islam between 2013 and 2016, operating predominantly from Turkey after leaving Syria in mid-2013. In June 2017, he publicly resigned from the group, ceased using his pseudonym, and relocated full-time to academia.

In January 2020, Nema was arrested by French authorities in Marseille while residing in France on an academic visa as a visiting researcher at the Institute of Research and Study on the Arab and Islamic World (IREMAM) at Aix-Marseille University. In February 2024, the French Court of Cassation definitively dismissed all charges against him concerning the 2013 kidnapping and enforced disappearance of human rights activist Razan Zaitouneh and her three colleagues (the "Douma Four"), confirming that there was no evidence linking him to the incident.

== Early life and academic career ==
Nema was born in Syria in 1988 into an educated family; his father worked in the medical sector and his mother in education. Prior to the Syrian uprising, he was arrested in 2009 at age 21 by the military intelligence branch of the Assad government (the "Palestine Branch") in Damascus and detained until 2010. His older brother, Dr. Mohammad Nema, was also detained for five years in the notorious Saydnaya Military Prison. Following his release in 2010, Nema completed his mandatory military service in the Syrian Armed Forces.

Following his departure from Syria to Turkey in 2013, Nema resumed his higher education. In October 2015, he enrolled in the Department of Political Science and International Relations at Istanbul Aydın University, graduating with high honors in 2017. He subsequently earned an Erasmus Programme scholarship to study at Eötvös Loránd University in Budapest, Hungary, in 2018, while pursuing postgraduate research in Istanbul. During his time in Turkey, he co-founded the Toran Center for Strategic Studies, an independent research institute focusing on Middle Eastern regional politics and governance.

In late 2019, Nema was granted a standard scientific visa by the French consulate in Istanbul after being selected as a visiting researcher for a scientific project at the Institute of Research and Study on the Arab and Islamic World (IREMAM) at Aix-Marseille University in southern France.

== Activity during the Syrian Civil War ==
Following the outbreak of the Syrian civil war in 2011, Nema defected from the Syrian military in 2012 and aligned himself with opposition groups in Eastern Ghouta, Rif Dimashq. Due to his fluency in standard Arabic and English, he was recruited by Liwa al-Islam (which later expanded into Jaysh al-Islam) to work in its public relations and media office under the pseudonym "Islam Alloush".

In mid-May 2013, Nema permanently departed besieged Eastern Ghouta for Turkey, establishing a media liaison desk in Istanbul and Hatay. He did not return to Eastern Ghouta after that date. While operating from Turkey, he facilitated interactions between the rebel faction and international humanitarian bodies, including Geneva Call, on compliance with international humanitarian law and training rebel fighters on the protection of civilians.

In 2014, the faction appointed dedicated field-based military spokespersons inside Syria, which significantly diminished Nema's communication role. Following the death of group leader Zahran Alloush in December 2015, Nema withdrew from active participation and officially resigned from Jaysh al-Islam on 2 June 2017, announcing the abandonment of his pseudonym and his definitive return to civilian and academic life. Following his resignation, he acted as a mediator to secure the release of Druze civilian hostages abducted by the Al-Nusra Front.

== Legal proceedings in France ==
On 29 January 2020, five days before his scheduled return flight to Istanbul upon concluding his research fellowship at Aix-Marseille University, Nema was arrested on a street in Marseille by plainclothes French police officers. The arrest was executed pursuant to a complaint filed three days earlier by non-governmental organizations, including the International Federation for Human Rights (FIDH), the Syrian Center for Media and Freedom of Expression (SCM), and the Ligue des droits de l'homme (LDH).

=== Detention and police violence allegations ===
Photographic evidence and investigative reports published by international media and his legal team revealed that Nema sustained severe facial and bodily injuries during his arrest by French police officers, including subconjunctival hemorrhages and extensive bruising. His defense team submitted formal complaints alleging excessive use of force and police brutality. He was placed in solitary confinement and prohibited from contacting his family for more than ten months, remaining held in pre-trial detention for nearly five years without family visitation rights.

His defense counsel, led by prominent French civil liberties lawyer Raphaël Kempf, criticized procedural irregularities during the preliminary investigation. Kempf argued that prosecutors inundated the case docket with thousands of pages of Arabic-language material unrelated to the alleged offenses—such as reports on Iraqi elections and COVID-19 vaccines—in an effort to extend statutory pre-trial detention limits while translations were arranged, alongside identifying errors by sworn court interpreters. In November 2024, Nema initiated an open-ended hunger strike in prison to protest prolonged detention, strip-search protocols, and inadequate access to specialized healthcare.

=== Dismissal of abduction and torture charges ===
In November 2023, the Paris Court of Appeals ordered the dismissal of charges against Nema relating to the enforced disappearance and kidnapping of human rights lawyer Razan Zaitouneh, Samira Khalil, Wa'el Hamada, and Nazem Hammadi (the "Douma Four"), who disappeared in December 2013, approximately seven months after Nema had left Eastern Ghouta. The court also dismissed charges of direct torture and intentional attacks against civilians.

On 16 February 2024, the French Court of Cassation upheld the dismissal, rejecting an appeal by civil parties and cementing Nema's final clearance regarding the abduction and disappearance of the Douma Four.

=== 2025 trial, appeal, and extradition request ===
In April 2025, Nema was brought before the Paris Assize Court on the remaining charges, which were confined to "complicity" in the recruitment of minors and association with an armed group formed to prepare war crimes between 2013 and 2016. During the trial, Nema pleaded not guilty, refusing to address the court in French, and insisted that the proceedings were politically motivated, citing the complete absence of physical or documentary evidence implicating him.

His defense attorneys, Raphaël Kempf and Romain Ruiz, raised procedural and jurisdictional challenges concerning the legitimacy of continuing the trial under universal jurisdiction following the collapse of the Assad regime in December 2024. The defense argued that universal jurisdiction was originally conceived solely as an exceptional remedy because Syrian courts were incapable of delivering justice under Assad. They contended that following political transition in Syria, primary jurisdiction returned to the Syrian sovereign judiciary, warning that trying a Syrian national before a jury of French lay citizens unfamiliar with the intricate Syrian conflict usurped the right of the Syrian people to establish domestic transitional justice.

Following a first-instance conviction on the remaining charges, Nema refused to accept the verdict and lodged an immediate appeal. Concurrently, the newly formed Syrian Ministry of Justice, via the Ministry of Foreign Affairs, submitted a formal diplomatic request to the French government demanding Nema's extradition to Syria to stand trial in his home country. The French government declined to provide an official response to the Syrian embassy, prompting Nema's legal team to pursue legal action against French authorities regarding continued arbitrary detention.

== See also ==
- Universal jurisdiction
- Human rights violations during the Syrian civil war
