= Massoud Hamid =

Syrian journalist

Massoud Hamid is a Syrian Kurdish journalism student. He took photographs of a pro-Kurdish event.

== Biography ==
Hamid received a three-year prison sentence. Hamid was held in solitary confinement in Adra Prison for one year from 2003–04 before he was allowed monthly visits, and Human Rights Watch said that interrogators reportedly tortured him and beat him with a studded whip on the bottom of his feet. His room was 2 by 0.85 metres (6 ft 7 in × 2 ft 9 in), largely filled by a toilet.

He received the 2005 cyberfreedom prize from Reporters Without Borders.
