= Abdul Qader Saleh =

Syrian rebel fighter

- عبد القادر صالح
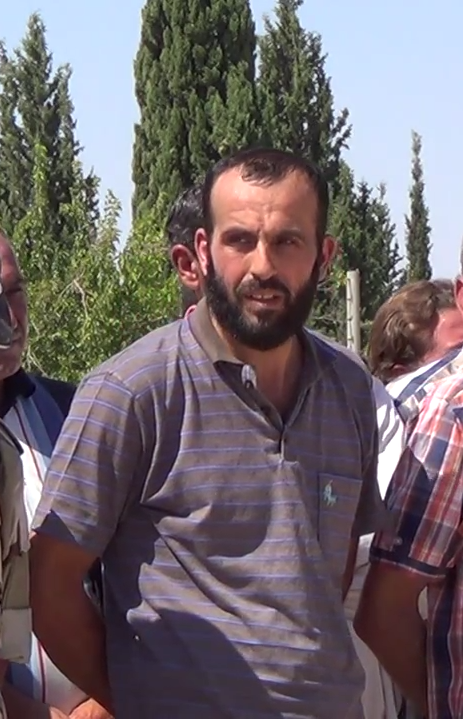
- Born: Abdul Qader Saleh; 1979; Mare', Syria
- Died: 18 November 2013 (age 33–34); Gaziantep, Turkey
- Burial place: Mare', Syria
- Children: 5
- Military career
- Service years: 2012–13
- Nickname: Haji Mare'
- Unit: Al-Tawhid Brigade
- Conflicts: Syrian Civil War; 2012 Aleppo Governorate clashes; Battle of Azaz (2012); Battle of Aleppo (2012–2016); Al-Qusayr offensive; Battle of al-Qusayr (2013) (WIA); Aleppo offensive (October–December 2013) (DOW)

Abdul Qader Saleh (Arabic: عبد القادر صالح, ʿAbd al-Qādir Ṣāliḥ; 1979 – 18 November 2013), also known as Haji Mare', was a prominent Syrian rebel commander who was the founder and commander of the al-Tawhid Brigade, an Islamist rebel group in the Syrian Civil War.

== Biography ==
Saleh was born to a Sunni Syrian family from the town of Mare' north of Aleppo, and originally worked as merchant. He was married and had five children.

After taking part in the formation of the al-Tawhid Brigade in July 2012, Saleh led the brigade and other rebel groups to capture half of Aleppo at the beginning of the Battle of Aleppo. He also criticised the official leadership-in-exile of the Syrian opposition, the Syrian National Coalition, saying that it should "increase the representation of revolutionary forces, and empower them within the Coalition’s apparatus and offices". His declarations were backed by the Aleppo Military Council, Ahrar al-Sham, the Conquest Brigade, the Free Men of Syria Brigade, the Ummah Brigade, and the Sultan Muhammad Brigade. Saleh's statements were seen by a regional expert as sign for the increasing radicalization and rise of Islamism among the Syrian rebels.

A member of the Supreme Military Council, Saleh had survived at least two assassination attempts. He died on 18 November 2013 in a hospital in Gaziantep, Turkey, as a result of fatal shrapnel wounds sustained following an airstrike by the Syrian Air Force on the Infantry Academy of al-Muslimiyah, north of Aleppo.
