= Unified Military Command of Eastern Ghouta =

Operations room of Syrian rebel factions

- الْقِيَادَةُ الْعَسْكَريَّةُ الْمُوَحَّدَةُ فِي الْغُوطَةِ الشَّرْقيَّةِ
- Leaders: Zahran Alloush † (27 September 2014 - 25 December 2015); Essam al-Buwaydhani (25 December 2015)
- Dates active: 27 August 2014 – 25 December 2015
- Groups: Jaysh al-Islam; al-Rahman Legion; Ajnad al-Sham Islamic Union (Eastern Ghouta branch dissolved into al-Rahman Legion); Ahrar ash-Sham (Damascus branch only)
- Active regions: Eastern Ghouta
- Wars: the Syrian Civil War

The Unified Military Command of Eastern Ghouta (Arabic: الْقِيَادَةُ الْعَسْكَريَّةُ الْمُوَحَّدَةُ فِي الْغُوطَةِ الشَّرْقيَّةِ, romanized: al-Qiyādat al-ʿAskarīyat al-Muwaḥḥadat fī l-Ḡūṭat aš-Šarqīyah) was an operations room of Syrian rebel factions that operated in Eastern Ghouta, Syria.

After the death of Zahran Alloush in late 2015, there were conflicts between Jaysh al-Islam and the Al-Rahman Legion, with clashes taking place in March 2016 and late April. The Al-Nusra Front established an operations room Jaish Al-Fustat which included Ahrar ash-Sham and Fajr al-Umma. Ahrar ash-Sham has reportedly remained neutral.

On 24 May 2016, leaders of Jaysh al-Islam & al-Rahman Legion met to sign a peace deal to end hostilities.

Since the death of Zahran Alloush and the appointment of Essam al-Buwaydhani the operations room has become largely defunct.

== See also ==
- List of armed groups in the Syrian Civil War
