= Qatar Charity =

Humanitarian organization in the Middle East

- قطر الخيرية
- Founded at: Qatar
- Type: Nonprofit organization
- Headquarters: Qatar
- Region served: Global
- Official language: Arabic; English
- Website: qcharity.org/en/global
- Formerly called: Qatar Charitable Society

Qatar Charity (formerly Qatar Charitable Society) is a humanitarian and development non-governmental organization in the Middle East. It was founded in 1992 in response to the thousands of children who were made orphans by the Afghanistan war and while orphans still remain a priority cause in the organization's work with more than 150,000 sponsored orphans, it has now expanded its fields of action to include six humanitarian fields (shelter, emergency medical response, food aid, WASH and financial aid) and seven development fields (health, education, WASH, food security, financial empowerment, housing and social care).

Between 2012 and 2017, Qatar Charity has spent over US$1.3 Billion on humanitarian and development operations and projects which provided relief and assistance to more than 178 million people in over 50 countries. These projects are carried out either directly by Qatar Charity through its 24 subsidiary offices around the world or through partnerships with international or local NGOs or IGOs.

Qatar Charity has been a strategic partner of UNCHR since 2012, with total contributions of USD 50,258,913 million for IDPs in Iraq, Yemen, Somalia, and Syria and refugees in Lebanon, Jordan, and Myanmar, reaching more than 1.6 million beneficiaries.

In some of the world's most conflict-affected countries such as Yemen and Syria, Qatar Charity ranked among the top contributors (including governments) to humanitarian activities according to the OCHA-monitored Financial Tracking Service.

In September 2023, the UAE removed 59 Qatari nationals and 12 entities, including "Qatar Charity" from the terrorist list, that was announced by the blockading countries during the Gulf crisis in June 2017.

== Management ==
As of 2015, Qatar Charity is headed by its president, Hamad bin Nasser al-Thani, and its CEO, Yousef bin Ahmed al-Kuwari.

== Major projects ==
Among QC's major long-term projects are "Tayf," a charity program to collect in-kind donations, and the annual "Iftar" project for the month of Ramadan, which aims to provide meals to thousands of fasting Muslims in targeted countries. In July 2015, Vodafone Qatar and Qatar Charity created a partnership. Employees of Vodafone helped feed workers at camps in the Ras Laffan Industrial City with Iftar meals during Ramadan. Vodafone promised to donate $275 per hour that each employee volunteers. The donations will go to Qatar Charity's Family Sponsorship program. The program helps low-income families throughout the Gulf area. Recently, Qatar Charity has also launched a website ("Travel and Aid") to attract participation in charitable work.

Qatar Charity is at the forefront of relief work in the face of major natural disasters. This was the case in Nepal, where Qatar Charity distributed $100.000 in food, blankets, mattresses and other non-food items including hygiene kits. In Sierra Leone, the charity supported the purchase of vital equipment at an Ebola Treatment Center (ETC) in Lunsar. It also played a part in the 2008–2009 Gaza Strip aid delivering around $140,000 worth of medical supplies. In other international efforts, it had raised around QAR 2 million as relief for the 2010 Pakistan floods.

In Niger, Qatar Charity supported local efforts to combat drought and improve the overall desperate conditions in the villages of Sowna and Aichign by funding the installation of modern solar-powered artesian wells. In southern Mali, it opened shelters for displaced children. During 2014, Qatar Charity's long-standing commitment to the people of Somalia was renewed as the charity provided QAR 25.5 million ($7 million) in life-saving relief, recovery and rehabilitation programs and activities. QC launched a project to construct the village of 'Doha Alkhair' in Djibouti at an estimated cost of QAR 4 million in September 2015. One-hundred houses, basic amenities and public utilities were among the planned infrastructure.

QC sent relief convoys to refugees in South Sudan, and funded programs in support of Syrian refugees in Lebanon. As of October 2015, the organization had carried out four housing projects in Syria, during which it repaired and built new villages. The most notable housing project is Al Rayyan, an under-construction village designed to accommodate 7,000 people. QC also deployed around 400 pre-fabricated housing units in Syria.

The charity promotes engagement, employment and enterprise development for young people in the Arab world. One of the latest such efforts includes the renovation project of Al-Quds University at a cost of QAR 4.5 million.

In West Africa, the foundation began in November 2021, a collaboration with Nigeria’s northern state of Jigawa and Mallam Inuwa Foundation to provide solar-powered water plants, boreholes, hand-pumps, and mosques across the 27 Local Governments councils in the state.

On January 13, 2022, Qatar Charity signed a memorandum with the international blindness prevention organization, Orbis in support of the IAPB's "2030 In Sight" initiative to promote global eye care and rehabilitation facilities are available to everyone who needs them.

In Bulenga, in the Upper West Region, Qatar Charity launched a centralized borehole water project. The project, which started in November 2023, supplies water with climate-resilient solar panels and pumps.

In January 2024, Qatar made a significant contribution to Gaza's humanitarian aid by sending over 2,000 tonnes of essential equipment and goods in another shipment.

== Partnerships and collaborations with UN agencies ==
=== OCHA (Office for the Coordination of Humanitarian Affairs ===
- 2011: MoU to establish a stand-by roster of specialized personnel and a team of technical specialists to field offices managed by OCHA (Office for the Coordination of Humanitarian Affairs).
- 2017: MoU to allocate a $500,000 grant to support activities by OCHA in Syria

=== UNHCHR (United Nations High Commissioner for Refugees) ===
- 2013: MoU to allocate a $2 million grant to the United Nations High Commissioner for Refugees emergency response in Rakhine State, Myanmar ($1,401,869 for temporary shelter construction and $467,290 in community kitchen infrastructure)
- 2017: MoU for a $5 million joint funding to support UNHCR programs in promoting protection and assistance to refugees and others persons falling under UNHCR mandate
- MoU to allocate a $500,000 grant from QC to the UNHCR emergency support to internally displaced people in Yemen
- MoU for a $300,000 funding from QC to the UNHCR's temporary shelter for the newly displaced in Mosul
- MoU for a $200,000 funding from QC to the UNHCR's life saving referral healthcare for Syrian Refugees in Lebanon
- MoU for a $500,000 funding from QC to the UNHCR's provision of shelter support to the internally displaced persons in Myanmar
- MoU for a $955,167 funding from QC to the UNHCR's provision emergency shelters for Iraqi displaced persons
- MoU for a $2,000,000 funding from QC to the UNHCR's operating budget of 2 community centers for the provision of protection services and assistance ($800,000), the operating budget of two primary healthcare clinics ($360,000), and the provision of street lighting infrastructure ($700,000) in Aleppo, Syria.
- 2018: MoU for a $9,630,000 grant from QC to the UNHCR for the reintegration and livelihood support to the refugees, the IDPs, returnees and hosting communities in Somalia
- MoU for a $2,387,304 grant provided by Qatar Fund For Development to the UNHCR for disaster risk reduction in Bangladesh
- MoU for a $6,440,951 grant provided by QC to the UNHCR for disaster risk reduction and response ($4,940,276) and emergency support with basic needs and essential services ($1,500,675) for Rohingya refugees in Bangladesh.

=== UNRWA ===
- 2013: Support to the UNRWA Health Programme in Gaza through $1 million funding

=== WFP United Nations World Food Program ===
- 2015: MoU: Qatar Charity pledges to facilitate the official authorization of initiatives led by local companies and branches of multinationals operating in Qatar that seek to support WFP United Nations World Food Program's food assistance programmes in the Middle East and around the world, including cash contributions and fundraising and advocacy campaigns and events
- 2017: MoU: Support to the humanitarian project in Syria "Food, Nutrition and Livelihood assistance to the People affected by the Crisis in Syria" through a $2 million funding from the Halab Labbeh fundraising campaign(1.023.850 beneficiaries)

=== UNICEF United Nations Children's Emergency Fund ===
- 2013: MoU: Framework for cooperation between QC and UNICEF to strengthen humanitarian prevention and response
- 2017: MoU: Enhance cooperation at Syrian humanitarian crisis level through a $2 million from the Halab Labbeh fundraising campaign funding and implementing of humanitarian projects

=== WHO World Health Organization ===
- 2017: MoU: Enhance cooperation at Syrian humanitarian crisis level through a $2 million funding from the Halab Labbeh fundraising campaign for the implementation of humanitarian projects

== Programs ==
=== Initiatives inside Qatar ===
==== One Heart ====
Local documentary produced by the Qatar Charity Society and represented his idea by a group of Qatari youth excellence in the areas of advocacy and media and Message Board and poetic adventures charity and entertainment filmed in the turkey to the definition of the difficult circumstances experienced by the population there.

==== Tayf ====
Tayf is a map-based web application that helps donors to connect people in need in Qatar.

=== Global innovative aid programs ===
==== Shop And Aid ====
Shop And Aid is a program that helps individuals to donate for Qatar Charity works by buying several products from the internet and the profit will go to Qatar Charity efforts.

==== Dal ala alkheer ====
Dal ala alkheer is a program where individuals can share different cases over the internet from the organization website and then win points as a reward. the program aim is to help individuals to donate to the organization without spending any money The name of the program means "the one who tells about good" it was taken from a quote for prophet Muhmmed That say "God reward the one who tells others about good the same reward as the one who actually made it".

==== Travel And Aid ====
Travel And Aid is a booking website for flights and hotels that help individuals and organization to book flights and hotels and donate to the organization with the broker fee for each booking.

== Cooperation with other charities ==
As one of the leading Gulf-origin nongovernmental organizations, Qatar Charity has made many partnerships with many of the lead charities in the world.

=== Cooperation with Bill and Melinda Gates Foundation against polio ===
In 2013, Qatar Charity signed an agreement with the Bill & Melinda Gates Foundation to raise funds in support of a six-year plan backed by the World Health Organization to eradicate polio globally.

=== Cooperation with Vodafone ===
Qatar Charity signed a partnership agreement with Vodafone in August 2010 to create and implement charitable and socially beneficial initiatives.

=== Cooperation with UNHCR, the UN Refugee Agency ===
UNHCR, the UN Refugee Agency and Qatar Charity (QC) have signed a Letter of Intent on an Islamic Philanthropy collaboration and three Zakat cooperation agreements amounting to QAR 18,206,369 (USD 5,000,376) to help address the most urgent needs of over 50,000 forcibly displaced families in Bangladesh, Afghanistan, and Yemen.

=== Cooperation with Humanitarian Aid Commission ===
==== Sudan ====
Qatar Charity has signed three humanitarian projects in Sudan, for integrated humanitarian response and technical agreements with the Humanitarian Aid Commission for water and education projects. This charity aims to support the health system and provide integrated services to vulnerable communities affected by conflict. The second technical agreement covers a safe return to school project, including 25 facilities, 100 units, water and sanitation, school bags, aids, and 89 coolers.

=== Cooperation with the International Organization for Migration ===
==== Sudan ====
In August 2024, Qatar Charity, in collaboration with the International Organization for Migration (IOM), launched a humanitarian project in response to severe flooding in Sudan. The initiative provided essential shelter materials to 550 displaced families in Port Sudan and planned to distribute 191 additional tents to affected shelters and host communities. This effort was coordinated with the Humanitarian Aid Commission and local committees in the Red Sea State.

=== Cooperation with OCHA ===
==== Syria ====
Qatar Charity is collaborating with the Office for Coordination of Humanitarian Affairs (OCHA) and the Humanitarian Fund for Syria (SHF) to support the "Supporting the Value Chain for the Wheat Crop" project in northwestern Syria. The project aims to enhance food security and livelihoods for northern Syrian residents by supporting the wheat crop from seed to bread production. The project includes planting stations for seed multiplication, rehabilitating silo facilities, and installing new mills with a 50-ton production capacity. The project has produced 4,000 tons of wheat and distributed 7 million and 280,000 bundles of bread to northern Syria residents.

In October 2023, an Umrah trip was organized for the 28 Syrian orphans under the Umrah programme. Additionally, Qatar is facilitating humanitarian aid to the affected countries like Syria, Yemen, and Lebanon.

In November 2023, Qatar Charity in cooperation with Qatar Fund for Development, installed 2,000 new tents and provided 10,000 blankets and 10,000 mattresses for approximately 10,000 affected people, who lost their homes due to the Turkey-Syria earthquake that occurred in February 2023.

On 8 February 2023, According to article published by Reuters, Governments and many international organizations from around the world responded to offer support to Turkey after earthquake of magnitude 7.8 struck central Turkey and northwest Syria. Qatar Charity distributed 27,000 hot meals in the Turkish city of Gaziantep, also supplied relief items to shelters in Turkey and Syria.The group allocated $6 million for the first stages of its response.

Also, Qatar has donated portacabins and mobile homes used for last year's World Cup soccer tournament to earthquake zones in Turkey and Syria where they will accommodate people left homeless.

In December 2024, Qatar Charity launched a 40-truck humanitarian aid convoy to Syria as part of its "Reviving Hope" campaign, providing food, medical supplies, winter clothing, and hygiene kits. The aid, valued at 4.5 million Qatari riyals, targets millions of Syrians affected by the ongoing crisis.

=== Collaboration with Food Security Commission ===
==== Mauritania ====
In October 2025, Qatar Charity (QC), through its Mauritania office, provided food assistance to 1,000 families affected by floods in the Brakna and Trarza regions. The aid, distributed in collaboration with the Food Security Commission, included food baskets containing a month's supply of essential items. Local officials and beneficiaries acknowledged the significant role of this support in addressing urgent needs following the natural disaster.

== International standards compliance ==
Qatar Charity operates according to a set of internally developed standards but is also fully compliant with international codes of conduct and security. Qatar Charity is a signatory of the code of conduct for the International Red Cross and Red Crescent Movement and NGOs for disaster relief. Qatar Charity also uses the Sphere Project Humanitarian Charter and Minimum Standards in Humanitarian Response and ensures their implementation in its operations. Lastly, Qatar Charity has implemented quality standards that enabled it to obtain ISO / IEC 27001, a certification from the Bureau Veritas Certification Holding SAS, which is specialized in audit and international certification services.

== Controversies ==
In July 2020, The Telegraph, UK published an apology and agreed to pay libel damages to Nectar Trust, its Trustees and Qatar Charity for falsely linking both organizations and accusing them of clandestine activities. The Telegraph in its articles on 17 August and 19 October 2019, had written that Nectar Trust is an arm of Qatar Charity through which Qatar Charity channel money to various Islamic groups in Europe. But in its apology, The Telegraph wrote that U.K.’s Charity Commission had clarified that Nectar Trust is an independent charity organizations registered in the UK and Wales with no ties to Qatar Charity. The Telegraph further clarified that the UK, EU and UN had at no time designated both organizations as terrorist organizations and that whatever designation by Saudi Arabia has no legal force in the UK, EU and at UN level.

The Emaan Trust of Sheffield lists Aiman Mohammed Ebrahim Saeed as a person with significant control. Saeed was given a suspended 18-month jail sentence and ordered to pay £300 compensation each to seven victims whose stolen phones were found in his possession.

It is worth noting that Qatar Charity has always been cleared from any accusations of support to terrorism by the United Nations

On February 11, 2015, Sudan Tribune reported controversial statements by Yahia Sadam, an official of the Minni Minnawi Sudanese liberation movement who accused Qatar of endorsing the genocide perpetrated by Sudanese militiamen in Darfur by funneling money though the Sudanese branch of Qatar Charity, active in Darfur since 2010. Sadam claimed that Qatar Charity, which had purportedly signed a cooperation agreement with the Sudanese troops, was "building housing complexes in remote and isolated areas to harbor and train extremist groups." In May 2023, Qatar Charity (QC), sent 40 tons of relief aid through a Qatari airlift flight to Sudan. Furthermore in June 2023, Qatar’s foreign minister, Sheikh Mohammed bin Abdulrahman Al Thani, contributed $50 million to program aiding conflict-stricken Sudan. On 20 Aug 2023, Qatar Charity (QC) sent a new shipment of specialized medical supplies for kidney diseases and cancer from Turkey’s Istanbul Airport to Port Sudan Airport, reported by Relief Web. The shipment included 70 tons of specialized medicines and medical supplies that reached the country since commencement of the ongoing conflict, adding that cancer medications benefited approximately 18,000 cancer patients across various centers in Sudan. Also during Sep 2023, UNHCR declared its partnership with Qatar in support to Sudanese refugees. The partnership provided cash assistance to 22,341 Sudanese refugees to enable them to secure their most urgent needs, such as rent, food, and healthcare.

While Saudi Arabia, Egypt, and other countries in the region designated Qatar Charity as a terrorist organization along with a dozen organizations in the aftermath of the blockade imposed on Qatar in June 2017, the United Nations continues to work with Qatar Charity. It is worth noting that Qatar Charity had won numerous Saudi Arabian awards just months before the feud, among which the 1st prize at the Arab Gulf Programme for Development (AGFUND) for its project in Sudan: 'Promoting Voluntary Return and Peace Building in Darfur'

In 2013, while Al-Kuwari was CEO of Qatar Charity, a Washington Institute for Near East Policy report emerged that Qatar Charity assistance had made its way to the Syrian Islamic Front, an umbrella group of powerful jihadist organizations operating in the Syrian Civil War. The Qatar Charity logo reportedly appeared in the video showing Syrian Islamic Front affiliates distributing the Qatar Charity-labelled aid. In 2013, Iranian news agency FARS reported that Qatar had wired $5 billion to Syrian rebel groups through Qatar Charity.

In May 2016, Hamad bin Nasser al-Thani, a member of the Qatari royal family, and Yusuf Ahmed Al-Kuwari traveled to Italy, where Qatar Charity reportedly donated 25 million euros over three years for the construction of mosques and Islamic centers. These donations led to questions over how religious instruction will be implemented in the religious centers.

== Awards and recognition ==
- 1997: Accredited in Special Status with the United Nations Economic and Social Council ECOSOC
- 2004: Observer membership at International Organization for Migration IOM
- 2008: Won Voluntary Award as "best organization" – Qatar
- 2009: Certificate of appreciation at Dubai International Humanitarian Aid & Development Conference & Exhibition DIHAD – Dubai, UAE
- 2010: Certificate of Honor from Ajman Ruler – Ajman, UAE
- 2012: Award of Pioneering Projects in the social work category from the GCC Council of Ministers of Social Affairs- Saudi Arabia
- 2013: Sicily International Prize – Italy
- 2014: Excellence Reward for Orphans' care in the GCC Countries (KAFEL) by the Regional Network for Social Responsibility – Bahrein
- 2015: Won Sanabel Award for Community Responsibility in Orphan Care Institutions of the Gulf Cooperation Council (GCC) for the category of Community Initiatives in the Field of Orphan Care at the GCC level- Bahrain
- 2016: Won 1st prize at the Arab Gulf Programme for Development (AGFUND) for its pioneering development projects in Saudi Arabia and for its project in Sudan: 'Promoting Voluntary Return and Peace Building in Darfur' – Switzerland
- 5 awards at the Bahrain Technical Innovation Conference in Bahrain
- 2017: Membership at Start Network – United Kingdom
- 2018 : Won "Change Maker Award" at Aid & Trade – London United Kingdom
- 2013, 2014, 2015, 2017 : Ranked in the top 10 NGOs for humanitarian work in Syria, Palestine and Somalia. The ranking was reported by the Financial Tracking Service (FTS) managed by the United Nations Office for the Coordination of Humanitarian Affairs (OCHA).
- 2018: Full membership in the Somalia NGO Consortium
  - Best Charitable Organization Arab Best Awards
