= Syrian Islamic Liberation Front =

Coalition of Syrian Islamist rebel groups

Syrian Islamic Liberation Front جبهة تحرير سوريا الإسلامية Jabha Tahrir Suriya al Islamiyyah
- Official logo of the SILF
- Leaders: Ahmed Eissa al-Sheikh (Suqour al-Sham); Zahran Alloush (spokesperson) (WIA) (Liwa al-Islam)
- Dates active: September 2012 – 25 November 2013
- Groups: Farouq Brigades; Amr bin al-a’as Brigade; Deir ez-Zor Revolutionary Council; Al-Naser Salaheddin Brigade; Conquest Brigade (merged with the Al-Tawhid Brigade in September, 2013); Suqour al-Sham (left to join the Islamic Front on November 22, 2013); Jaysh al-Islam (left to join the Islamic Front on November 22, 2013); Al-Tawhid Brigade (left to join the Islamic Front on November 22, 2013)
- Headquarters: Sarjeh, Idlib Governorate
- Active regions: Syria
- Ideology: Sunni Islamism: Salafism (Factions)
- Size: 35,000 (claimed, 2012); 37,000-40,000 (2013)
- Part of: Free Syrian Army
- Wars: Syrian civil war

The Syrian Islamic Liberation Front (SILF; Arabic: جبهة تحرير سوريا الإسلامية, "Jabhat Tahrīr Sūriya al-Islāmiyyah") was a coalition of Syrian Islamist rebel groups nominally under the command of the Supreme Military Council of the Free Syrian Army that fought against the Syrian government in the Syrian Civil War. At the end of 2012, it was one of the strongest rebel coalitions in Syria, representing up to half of the rebel forces.

In late November 2013, Suqour al-Sham, Jaysh al-Islam, and the Al-Tawhid Brigade, the largest and most influential members of the Front, announced that they were joining the Islamic Front, greatly weakening SILF. On 25 November 2013, a statement appeared on the Front's website announcing that it was ceasing all operations. The Syrian Islamic Liberation Front was thought to be more moderate than the Ahrar al-Sham-led Syrian Islamic Front, and also closer Arab Gulf States than the Syrian Islamic Front which was closer to Turkey and Qatar.

== Background ==
Founded in September 2012 after secret negotiations between the group's leaders, the group was headed by Ahmed Eissa al-Sheikh, the leader of the Suqour al-Sham Brigades. The coalition included around 20 Islamist groups and had tens of thousands of fighters active throughout much of Syria, overshadowing the Free Syrian Army (FSA) in some regions. While some member groups appeared to consider themselves members of both the Syrian Liberation Front and the FSA, Abu Issa said the group aimed to maintain brotherly relations with all rebel groups while declining to offer full support and criticising those leaders of the FSA that remained in Turkey.

The coalition included some of the most important rebel units active in the civil war, including the Suqour al-Sham Brigades (Idlib), Farouq Brigades (Homs), Liwa al-Islam (Damascus) and Tawhid Brigade (Aleppo). Other prominent groups in the coalition included Liwa Dawud, the Deir ez-Zor Revolutionary Council (Deir ez-Zor), Tajamo Ansar al-Islam (Damascus), Amr Ibn al-Aas Brigade (Aleppo), al-Naser Salaheddin Brigade (Latakia), and the Conquest Brigade (Aleppo). These groups were geographically scattered, varied in size and influence, and were dependent on different sources of funding. It was unclear how effectively the coalition coordinated between the varying groups.

=== Minor Groups ===
The coalition also included other smaller less known groups

- Suqour al-Kurd Brigade
- Suqour Homs Battalion
- Shaheed ahmed Ouda Battalion
- Shuhada Baba amr Battalion
- Kurdish Military Council
- mohammed ibn abdullah Battalion
- Jund allah battalion
- homs Brigade
- Islamic Farouq Brigades
- Fursan al-Haq Battalion
- al-iman Brigade
- Qal‘at homs Battalion
- Al-Bara' ibn Malik Brigade
- Dhoul-Nourain Brigade.
- National Liberation Movement

== Weapons ==
Abu Issa said that the coalition obtained their weapons from attacks on the Syrian Armed Forces and from arms dealers inside and outside Syria, however, the group reportedly received support from Turkey and Qatar. It had been accused by members of the FSA of monopolizing the supply of weapons through Turkey in order to marginalize unaffiliated rebel groups.

== Ideology ==
The group had a Sunni Islamist ideology. It included both Muslim Brotherhood and Salafist inspired groups, however many of the more hardline Islamist groups active in the Syrian civil war were members of the Syrian Islamic Front. The group did not include the jihadist Al-Nusra Front, and Ahrar al-Sham withdrew from the group in protest at the killing of a jihadist leader by one of the other groups. Some in the FSA criticized the group for its emphasis on an Islamic identity in a religiously mixed country. The group had a minimalist political platform, promising to protect minorities and stating that religious Muslim law was the point of reference for the group. In July 2013, the leader of the group called for sectarian attacks on Alawite homes and villages, but retracted the statement weeks later.

== See also ==
- List of armed groups in the Syrian Civil War
