= Battle of Azaz (2012) =

2012 battle during Syrian Civil War

Coordinates: 36.3508°N 37.0239°E

- Part of the 2012 Aleppo Governorate clashes (Early insurgency phase of the Syrian civil war)
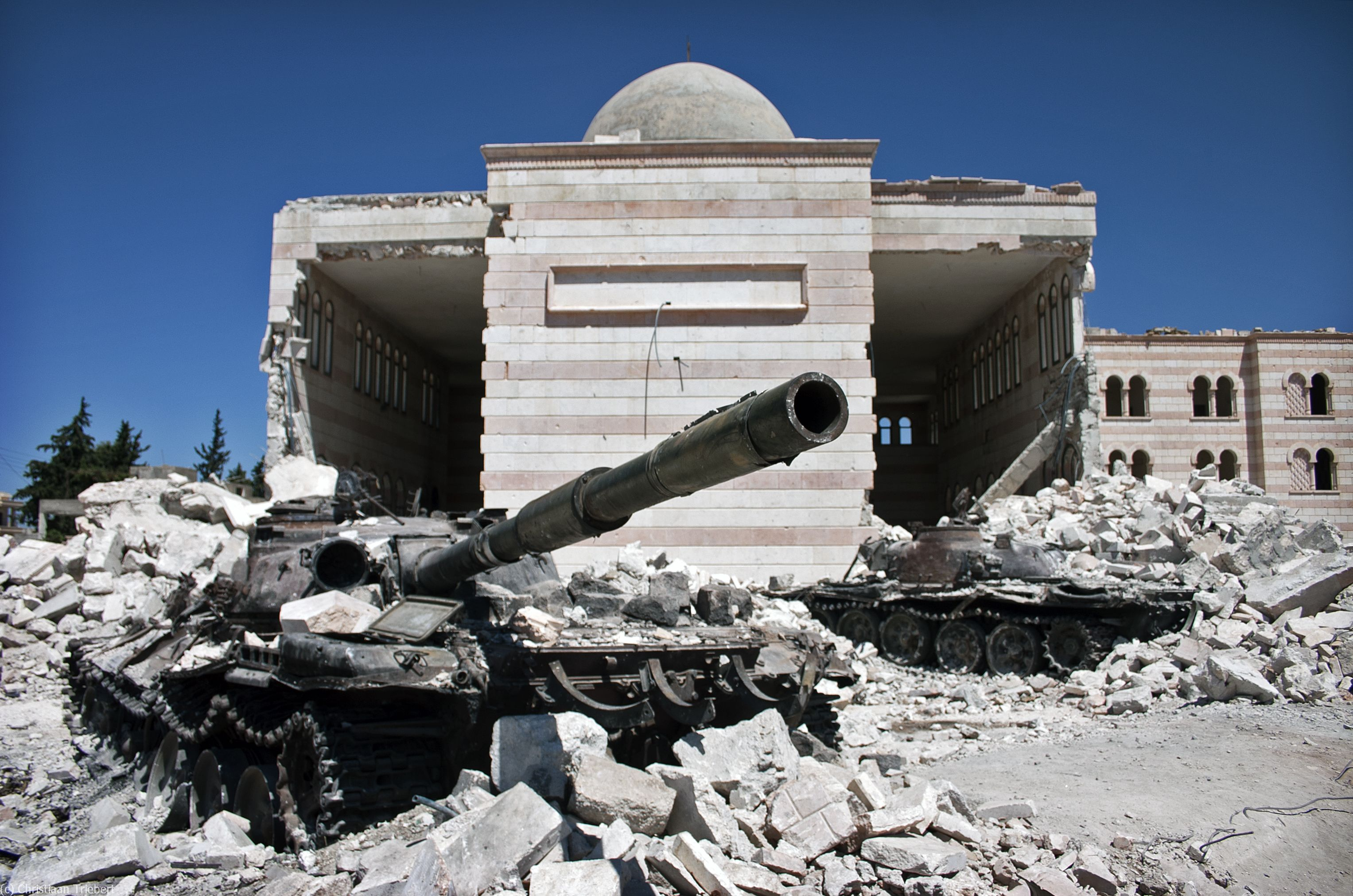
Date	6 March – 23 July 2012 (4 months, 2 weeks and 3 days)
Location	Azaz, Aleppo Governorate, Syria
Result	Syrian opposition victory

Belligerents
Syrian Opposition	(Syria) Syrian Government

Commanders and leaders
Ammar al-Dadikhli (Northern Storm Brigade); Capt. Alaa Mansour Ouso † (Ibraheem Afesh Battalion)	Unknown

Units involved
Free Syrian Army; Northern Storm Brigade; Al-Tawhid Brigade; Free North Brigade; Conquest Brigade; Muthanna ibn Haritha Battalion; Amr ibn al-A'as Battalion; Local ad hoc militias	Syrian Armed Forces; Syrian Army; 5th Mechanized Division; Syrian Air Force

Casualties and losses
	17 tanks destroyed (rebel claim)

The Battle of Azaz took place between the Syrian Arab Army and the Free Syrian Army for control of the city of Azaz, north of Aleppo, during the early insurgency phase of the Syrian civil war.

== The first Azaz offensive ==
By 6 March, the rebel Free Syrian Army had taken control of towns north of Aleppo and were attacking Azaz. Subsequent, defections from the Syrian Army, following a crackdown in the wider Aleppo region against anti-government activists, led to the town becoming a battleground between the Syrian Army and the Free Syrian Army, made up of defectors and armed civilians in late March 2012. Three soldiers were killed by the FSA in fighting in March. On May 23, the government launched an assault on Azaz. As their armored columns approached the city from the west supported by helicopters and artillery, they encountered stiff rebel resistance from the combined forces of the Free North Brigade and the Muthanna ibn Haritha Battalion. Over the next three days, government forces attempted to take rebel-held neighborhoods. By the evening of May 26, rebels pushed the government out of the city, destroying five armored vehicles in the process.

== The second Azaz offensive ==
At the beginning of July, the Assad government began its second major offensive operation in northern Aleppo. Once again, the focus of this offensive was Azaz, which the government began to shell on July 2. A week later, the Syrian observatory for Human Rights reported heavy clashes in several of the city's neighborhoods. The struggle for Azaz continued until July 19, when rebel groups finally re-established control of the city. The government retreated to Menagh Air Base, which remained operational. On 23 July, it was confirmed that the FSA had finally taken control of Azaz. They said that 17 government tanks had been destroyed and one captured, although a journalist in the area counted 7 destroyed tanks.

There is video evidence of the battle itself to explain the mechanism of the rebels' success against government armor in this battle. A number of factors have contributed to their success. One account of the clashes indicated that rebels used rocket propelled grenades against the tanks. If this is the case, then rebels in Azaz have cultivated substantial anti-armor tactical proficiency. RPGs are not typically capable of penetrating the thick armor of main battle tanks. The rebels would have had to utilize complex tactics, carefully employing their anti-armor assets to achieve mobility kills before striking against weak points in the tanks' armor. The same account also points to the government blunders in the employment of its tanks, explaining that the government positioned its armored elements in a courtyard surrounding the mosque, pointing their guns outward towards the city in a defensive stance without infantry support aside from sniper over-watch from inside the mosque.

Also critical to the rebels success was the quantity of ammunition they possessed. Thanks to Azaz's proximity to the Turkish border, rebels there could easily access weapons, ammunition, and reinforcements via the Kilis Border Crossing. The Tawhid Brigade claims to receive support from foreign states. A Tawhid Brigade spokesman in Azaz by the name of Abdulaziz Salama reported that the brigade received some 700 RPG rounds, 300 rifles, and 3,000 grenades in two shipments coordinated by the US and Turkey.

== Further developments ==
On 16 December, Syrian government warplanes bombed the town. Most of the bombs hit the centre of Azaz, around three kilometres (two miles) from the Turkish border in an area dominated by Syrian rebels, but at least one landed 500 metres from Turkish soil, one official said. It also stirred panic at a Syrian refugee camp just inside Turkey. Hundreds of residents from Azaz were trying to cross the border. Azaz was again hit from the air on 26 January 2013.

== Bibliography ==
- Baczko, Adam; Dorronsoro, Gilles; Quesnay, Arthur (2017). Civil War in Syria: Mobilization and Competing Social Orders. Cambridge: Cambridge University Press. ISBN 9781108368926.
- Bolling, Jeffrey (2012). Rebel Groups in Northern Aleppo Province. Washington, D.C.: Institute for the Study of War.
