= Autaya =

Otaya أوتايا
- Village
- Location in Syria
- Coordinates: 33°31′32″N 36°27′20″E
- Country: Syria
- Governorate: Rif Dimashq
- District: Markaz Rif Dimashq
- Subdistrict: Douma District

Population (2004)
  - Total: 3,720
- Time zone: UTC+2 (EET)
  - Summer (DST): UTC+3 (EEST)
- City Qrya Pcode: C2350

Otaya (also spelled Utaya; Arabic: أوتايا) is a Syrian village located in Markaz Rif Dimashq, Douma District. Autaya had a population of 3,720 in the 2004 census.
