= Syria Deeply =

Single-issue news website on the Syrian Conflict

Syria Deeply is a single issue news website on the Syrian Conflict cofounded in December 2012 by Lara Setrakian and Azeo Fables. It is a collaboration with Ushahidi, freelance correspondents in the Middle East and other collaborators. It synthesizes information on the Syria conflict into a single website with sub headings covering issues regarding the Syrian conflict, interactive graphics, Google hangouts and video content. It has been compared to a next generation blog according to Gigaom that was ahead of the explanatory news trend active in 2014.

In 2013 it won a National Press Foundation award for 2013 Excellence in Online Journalism.

== Business Model ==
=== Distribution of Content ===
The website focuses on the Syria conflict active since the Arab Spring on a dedicated basis. Beyond its own website it spreads its content via various mainstream outlets. News Deeply has partnered with The New York Times columnist Nicholos Kristof, has presented interviews with its journalists on BBC and MSNBC, and has published news articles in publications including ABC News, and The New York Times In 2013, Syria Deeply had an Interview with John Kerry, Nicholas Kristof, Lara Setrakian and The New York Times.

=== Revenue ===
The parent company, News Deeply, has created multiple other Deeply sites including Ebola Deeply and Water Deeply. The company has several revenue streams including philanthropic support, brand sponsorships, and tech design and consulting of similar platforms for universities and think tanks.
