= Zahran Alloush =

Syrian Islamist Rebel Leader

- Zahran Alloush attending a military parade in eastern Ghouta, 29 April 2015
- Born: 1971; Douma, Syria
- Died: 25 December 2015 (aged 43–44); Utaya, Rif Dimashq, Syria
- Cause of death: Air strike
- Other name: Moon of the jihad
- Known for: Commander of Jaysh al-Islam
- Military career
- Allegiance: Islamic Front (November 2013 – December 2015)
- Branch: Jaysh al-Islam (2011 – December 2015)
- Service years: 2011–2015
- Rank: Commander of Jaysh al-Islam; Military Chief of the Islamic Front; Leader of the Unified Military Command of Eastern Ghouta
- Conflicts: Syrian Civil War †: Battle of Damascus (2012); Rif Dimashq offensive (November 2012–February 2013); Damascus offensive; Battle of Al-Malihah; Battle of Yarmouk Camp (2015); Battle of Zabadani (2015); Eastern Ghouta offensive (2015); Siege of Eastern Ghouta †; Inter-rebel conflict during the Syrian civil war; Syrian opposition–Islamic State of Iraq and the Levant conflict

Zahran Alloush (Arabic: زَهْرَان عَلُّوش, romanized: Zahrān ʿAllūš, 1971 – 25 December 2015) was a Syrian Islamist rebel leader who was the commander of Jaysh al-Islam (Army of Islam), a major component of the Islamic Front, of which he was the military chief, and was described as one of the most powerful leaders in rebel-held Syria until his death. He was killed in a joint Russian and Syrian airstrike on 25 December 2015 and was succeeded by Essam al-Buwaydhani as head of Jaysh al-Islam.

== Early life ==
Zahran Alloush was born in Douma, Rif Dimashq, in 1971. His father was Abdullah Alloush, a scholar and the previous director of Al Assad center for Quran studies in Damascus. He joined the faculty of law at Damascus University, and completed a master's degree in Shariah at the Islamic University of Madinah. The Syrian Intelligence Palestine Branch arrested him in 2009 on charges of weapons possession. He was released from Sednaya Prison in 2011 as part of a general amnesty three months into the Syrian Uprising.

== Syrian Civil War ==
Following his release, he established a rebel group called the Battalion of Islam to fight the Syrian Government. The group expanded and renamed itself the Brigade of Islam, and in 2013 it merged with other rebel factions to form Jaysh al-Islam, still under Alloush's leadership. This became the most powerful rebel group operating in the Damascus area.

According to Joshua Landis, Alloush called for cleansing Damascus of all Alawites and Shiites, later telling Western journalists that these and similar statements had been caused by the pressure and "psychological stress" he was under from living through the Syrian Government's siege of Ghouta.

A number of Syrian opposition figures have accused Alloush of being responsible for the kidnapping of Syrian activist Razan Zeitouneh and her companions in Douma on 9 December 2013. Alloush denied the allegations.

In April 2015, Zahran Alloush suddenly appeared in the Turkish city of Istanbul. A spokesperson from the Army of Islam declared that Alloush would meet rebel groups' leaders there in order to discuss how to lift the siege in Ghouta. This led to public criticism, with many in the media wondering how he could travel to Turkey and come back to Syria while Ghouta was under siege.

Alloush has denounced democracy and called for an Islamic state to succeed Assad; however, in a May 2015 interview with McClatchy journalists, his spokesperson used moderate rhetoric, claiming that Syrians should decide what sort of state they wanted to live under and that Alawites were "part of the Syrian people" and only those with blood on their hands should be held accountable. His spokesman went on to say that the sectarian and Islamist rhetoric Alloush had previously made was only intended for internal consumption and to rally his fighters. In an interview with The Daily Beast in the same period, his spokesman disassociated Zahran from al-Nusra, denied that he wanted to impose Sharia law, and called for a technocratic government.

He was reported killed, along with other senior members of his faction in the village of Utaya, east of Damascus, on 25 December 2015, in an airstrike on a meeting with rival rebel commanders from Ahrar al-Sham. Lebanese pro-government media said that 13 pro-government airstrikes had targeted Damascus that day. Although the Syrian army claimed the strike, local reports said it was by Russian warplanes. A senior member of Ahrar al-Sham group, which also lost commanders in the airstrike, said "The martyrdom of Sheikh Zahran Allouch should be a turning point in the history of the revolution and rebel groups should realize they are facing a war of extermination by (Russian President Vladimir) Putin's regime." Other insurgent groups, including Jabhat al-Nusra, lamented his loss. His targeting was linked by Western media to his participation in forthcoming peace talks between the government and opposition. The New York Times commented that his death was "a significant blow to the armed opposition, bolstering President Bashar al-Assad".
