= Al-Tawhid Brigade =

Disbanded armed Islamist insurgent group in Syria

al-Tawhid Brigade
- لواء التوحيد
- Official logo of the Tawhid Brigade
- Leaders: Abdul Qader Saleh † (Top commander July 2012–November 2013); Adnan Bakkour † (Senior commander); Abdelaziz Salameh (Top commander November 2013–2014); Maj. Mohammed Hamadeen (Free North Brigade); Col. Yusef al-Jader † (Senior commander in Aleppo); Yussef al-Abbas † (Intelligence chief)
- Dates active: 18 July 2012 – 18 June 2015?
- Groups: Free North Brigade; Mountain Knights Brigade; Darat Izza Brigade; Aleppo Shahba Battalions; Conquest Brigade; Northern Storm Brigade; Elite Islamic Battalion (left in November 2013)
- Headquarters: Aleppo, Mare', and Tell Rifaat
- Active regions: Aleppo Governorate; Homs Governorate; Raqqa Governorate; Al-Hasakah Governorate; of Syria
- Ideology: Sunni Islamism; Jihadism (until 2015); Factions: Salafism
- Size: 8,000 (July 2012); 10,000 (own claim) (Nov 2012); 13,000 (own claim) (Sep 2013); 8,000-10,000 (December 2013)
- Part of: Free Syrian Army (2012–2013); Syrian Islamic Liberation Front (2012–2013); Islamic Front (2013–2015); Levant Front (coalition) (2014–2015); Euphrates Volcano (eastern branch only, 2014); Syrian Revolutionary Command Council (2014)
- Wars: the Syrian Civil War

The al-Tawhid Brigade (Arabic: لواء التوحيد, romanized: Liwa al-Tawhid, lit. 'Brigade of monotheism'; named after Tawhid, the "oneness of God,") was an armed Islamist insurgent group involved in the Syrian Civil War.

The al-Tawhid Brigade was formed in 2012. Reportedly backed by Qatar, al-Tawhid was considered one of the biggest groups in northern Syria, dominating most of the insurgency around Aleppo.

Its leader Abdul Qader Saleh was killed in November 2013 in a Syrian Air Force airstrike.

== Organization ==
=== Ideology ===
The al-Tawhid Brigade was initially founded by Islamist groups, and followed an ideology similar to that of the Muslim Brotherhood. Agence France-Presse and Al-Monitor journalists described the unit as being affiliated with the Muslim Brotherhood. According to As-Safir, the al-Tawhid Brigade even operated as an "armed wing of the Syrian Muslim Brotherhood" due to close connections between leaders of the rebel group and Brotherhood figures. However, other sources argued that the al-Tawhid Brigade simply accepted support from anyone who was somewhat ideologically similar to itself, including Salafists. Based on a Saudi, anti-Assad source, researcher Mark Tomass described the al-Tawhid Brigade as "Salafi-Jihadist" despite it being "classified as moderate". In late 2013, the rebel group co-signed a joint statement calling for Sharia law and rejecting the authority of the Syrian National Coalition.

=== Branches ===
Originally, al-Tawhid was composed of four subunits, the Mountain Knights Brigade, the Darat Izza Brigade, the Free North Brigade, and the Aleppo Shahba Battalions. The Mountain Knights Brigade operated in the southwest of Aleppo Governorate near the border with the Idlib Governorate and the city of Atarib. The Darat Izza Brigade was named after the town of Darat Izza and operated in the western part of the city of Aleppo. The Free North Brigade was the largest subunit of the Tawhid Brigade and present in the Kilis Corridor. It took over the leadership of several subunits in al-Bab to the east of Aleppo.

By March 2013, the al-Tawhid Brigade had become active in northeastern and eastern Syria as well, where one of its representatives, Sheikh Saif, tried to set up a loose coalition of Islamist groups known as the "Islamic Front". Around June 2013, the militia was reorganised into nearly 30 sub-factions. By June, the rebel group had 38 "regiments" and about 11,000 fighters as well as 10,000 "administrators".

In September 2013, the Supreme Military Council's head Salim Idris brokered a merger between the Conquest Brigade and the al-Tawhid Brigade, with the two units holding a ceremony to facilitate their unification. They claimed to have a united strength of 13,000 fighters across all of Syria.

In November 2013, the Elite Islamic Battalion left the Tawhid Brigade.

On 2 March 2014, the Northern Storm Brigade announced that they would join the Islamic Front under the leadership of the al-Tawhid Brigade. Also in 2014, the Euphrates Jarabulus Battalions left to join the Dawn of Freedom Brigades.

=== Foreign support ===
The al-Tawhid Brigade reportedly enjoyed "strong Qatari backing."

== History ==
=== Formation ===
The al-Tawhid Brigade was formed in 2012 in order to coordinate the Battle of Aleppo, with the stated mission to found a "civil state in Syria with Islam being the main source of legislation." Researcher Charles R. Lister described the initial al-Tawhid Brigade as "a coalition of local Aleppo-based Islamist units", following an ideology similar to that one of the Muslim Brotherhood. The rebel group's foundation was possibly inspired or even ordered by one of the rebels' main allies, Turkey, to facilitate a greater cooperation among insurgent forces.

From its inception, the brigade cooperated with hardline jihadist forces including the al-Nusra Front; for instance, the group ruled Manbij and Jarabulus alongside the al-Nusra Front.

=== Activities ===
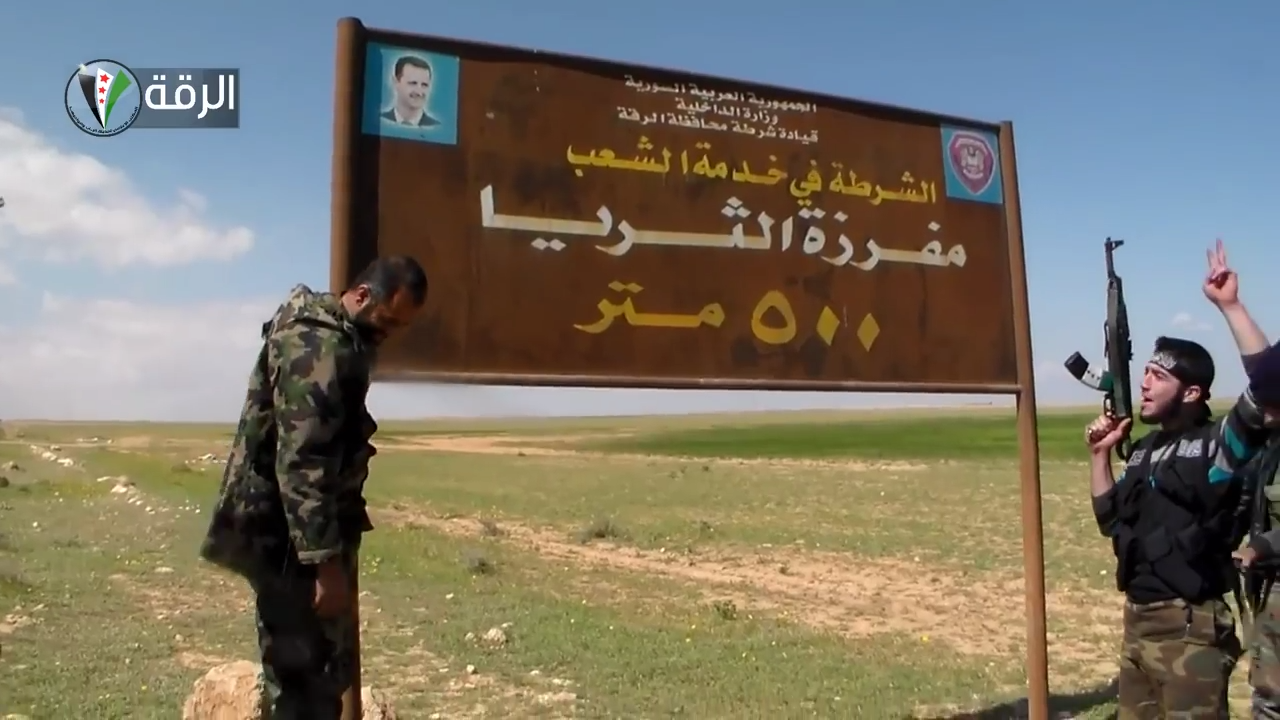
Fighters of the al-Tawhid Brigade deface an image of President Bashar al-Assad on the road between Hama and Raqqa on 27 March 2013.

In November 2012, the Tawhid Brigade announced their support for the Syrian National Coalition but called for greater representation in the coalition. The brigade's leadership called for "a civil state where the basis of legislation is the Islamic faith, with consideration for all the [minority] groups of Syria". They thereby implicitly rejected an earlier statement they had made, with other local factions, which had called for an Islamic state in Syria and denouncing the Syrian National Coalition. In December 2012, the al-Tawhid Brigade spearheaded the capture of Aleppo's Army College.

In January 2013, the Tawhid Brigade announced on its website that it had become a member of the Syrian Islamic Liberation Front. In the next month, the al-Tawhid Brigade, Ahrar al-Sham, and the al-Nusra Front launched an offensive which ended in the conquest of the Aleppo suburb of Sheikh Saeed.

In May 2013, the hell cannon, a mortar-like improvised firearm designed and built by the insurgent group Free North Brigade, was first noted in the press.

In June 2013, the al-Tawhid Brigade sent over 300 fighters under the command of Saleh and the Aleppo Military Council's Obaidi to the Battle of al-Qusayr.

In August 2013, the al-Tawhid Brigade alongside various Islamist rebel groups captured the town of Khanasir, severing the supply routes of the remaining Syrian government loyalists north of Aleppo. In the same month, the Islamic State of Iraq and the Levant (ISIL), the al-Nusra Front, Ahrar al-Sham, the Suqour al-Sham Brigade, and the al-Tawhid Brigade announced that they would besiege the YPG-held city of Kobanî. However, infighting between the groups erupted in January 2014 and some of them began to align with the YPG under the name of the Euphrates Islamic Liberation Front. In March 2014, ISIL captured Sarrin and several other towns and villages from the YPG and the EILF. Clashes continued through May 2014.

On 22 September 2013, the Tawhid Brigade joined the Islamic Front coalition. The group was formed largely from the Syrian Islamic Front and the Syrian Islamic Liberation Front, both of which were officially dissolved in the process.

On 24 September 2013, the Tawhid Brigade co-signed a statement with 11 other rebel groups which called for Sharia law and, allying with al-Qaeda, rejected the authority of the Syrian National Coalition.

=== Disintegration ===
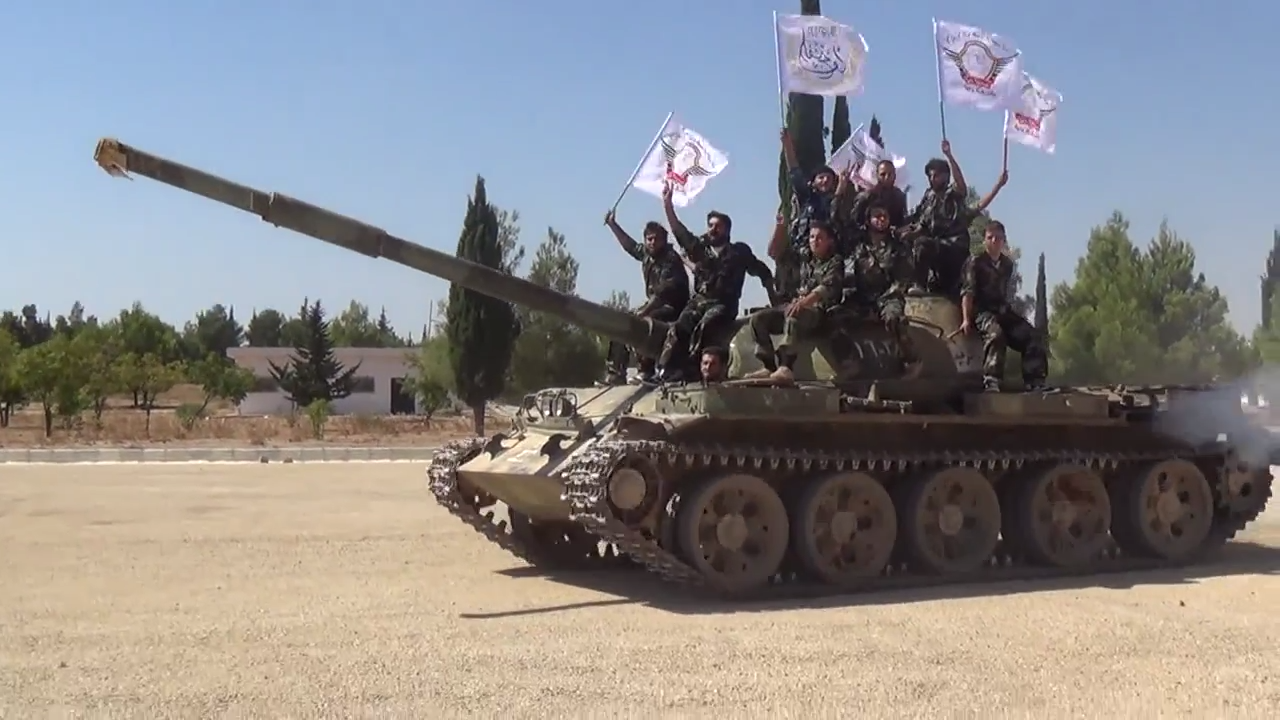
A T-62 main battle tank operated by the Tawhid Brigade in Tell Rifaat, September 2013.

On 14 November 2013, a Syrian Air Force airstrike bombarded an army base held by the al-Tawhid brigade in Aleppo killing a commander by the name of Youssef al-Abbas also injuring two others including al-Tawhid's head commander Abdul Qader Saleh. Saleh subsequently died of his wounds in a Turkish hospital.

Following the death of Saleh, the Tawhid Brigade reportedly suffered serious internal divisions and lost considerable members in defections to other rebel factions. They also experienced a sharp reduction in military assistance from Gulf states, due to US pressure to support more moderate rebel groups.

On 10 September 2014, the Tawhid Brigade's eastern branch became a founding member group of the Euphrates Volcano operations room based in Kobanî. By October 2014, al-Tawhid had seen many of its eastern Aleppo province affiliates becoming defunct but re-emerging as break-off groups, and its northern branch Free North Brigade being "superseded" by the Northern Sun Battalion (Shams al-Shamal). Other rebel forces continued to use the name Free North Brigade and eventually joined the Sham Legion. Some remnants of the Tawhid Brigade near Azaz allied itself with the YPG and received equipment and training from the CIA in late 2014.

Most ex-fighters of the al-Tawhid Brigade became a core part of the Levant Front. However, in October 2016, 4 "battalions" of rebels in Aleppo using the flag of the al-Tawhid Brigade left the Levant Front and joined the Nour al-Din al-Zenki Movement. In December 2022, some al-Tawhid Brigade remnants left the Levant Front (then part of the Syrian National Army) and created a new group called Ahrar al-Tawhid, which joined the Al-Shahba Gathering in February 2023.

== See also ==
- List of armed groups in the Syrian Civil War
