= Islamic Front (Syria) =

Sunni Islamist militant group (2013–2015)

- الجبهة الإسلامية al-Jabhat al-Islāmiyyah
- Administration flag Official logo of the Islamic Front War flag
- Leaders: Ahmed Abu Issa; Zahran Alloush †; Hassan Aboud †; Abul-Abbas al-Shami; Abu Rateb; Abu Omar Hreitan
- Spokesperson: Islam Alloush
- Dates active: 22 November 2013 – March 2015
- Groups: Ahrar al-Sham; Jaysh al-Islam; Al-Tawhid Brigade; Ansar al-Sham; Kurdish Islamic Front (joined Ahrar al Sham in 2014); Liwa al-Haqq (joined Ahrar al Sham in 2014); Suqour al-Sham Brigades (joined Ahrar al Sham in 2015)
- Headquarters: Idlib Governorate, Syria
- Active regions: Syria
- Ideology: Islamic fundamentalism Sunni Islamism; Jihadism; Factions: Salafism; Salafi Jihadism
- Size: 50,000 (Jan. 2014); 40,000-70,000 (Mar. 2014)
- Part of: Syrian Revolutionary Command Council (2014–2015)
- Wars: the Syrian Civil War

The Islamic Front (Arabic: الجبهة الإسلامية, al-Jabhat al-Islāmiyyah) was a Sunni Islamist rebel alliance involved in the Syrian Civil War, which was formed by the union of seven separate groups on 22 November 2013. Its three largest components were Ahrar ash-Sham, the al-Tawhid Brigade and Jaysh al-Islam. The alliance was achieved by expanding the preceding Syrian Islamic Front alliance. It was described as "an umbrella organization rather than a full union", with constituent factions continuing to serve under their own distinct leaderships.

The Islamic Front wanted to transform Syria into an Islamic state after the planned overthrow of the government of President Bashar al-Assad. It refused to recognise most formal structures of the Syrian opposition, such as the Syrian National Council.

The alliance fragmented over the course of 2014. On 24 December 2014, the Islamic Front factions in the Aleppo Governorate formed the Levant Front alliance with other armed groups in northern Syria. In 2015, the Salafist group Ahrar ash-Sham – a major component of the Islamic Front alliance – joined with jihadist groups under the Army of Conquest operations room umbrella, successfully campaigning against the Syrian Arab Army in the northern districts from March to September 2015. The group continued its nominal membership of the Islamic Front alliance, despite its more jihadist orientation. By early 2015, the Islamic Front was being described as virtually defunct, with the largest member groups Ahrar ash-Sham and Jaysh al-Islam remaining separate entities, and the smaller IF factions (Liwa al-Haqq, Suqour al-Sham Brigade and Kurdish Islamic Front) being absorbed into Ahrar ash-Sham.

== History ==
=== Founding ===
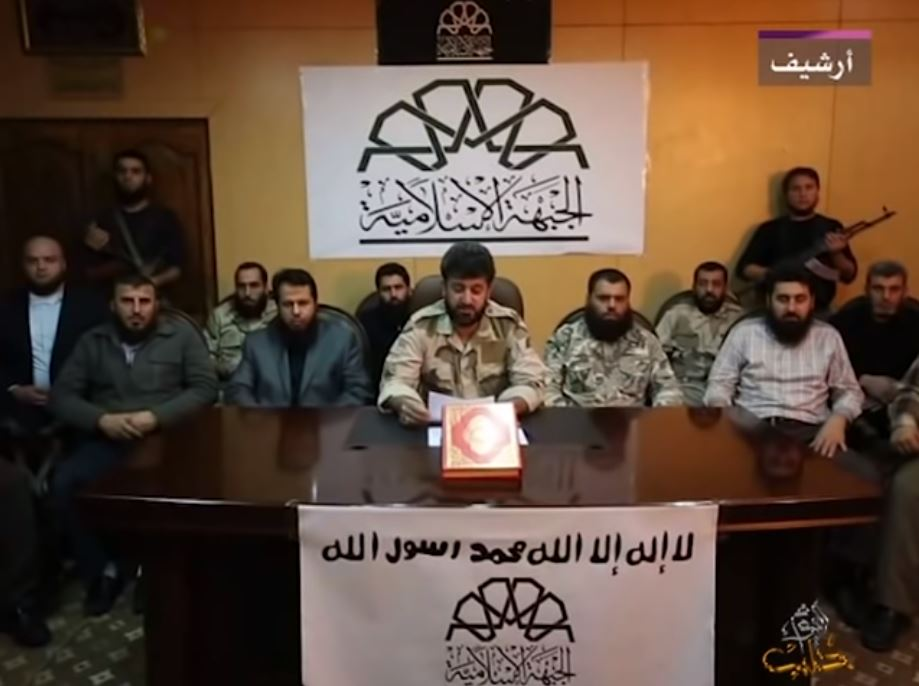
Founding of the Islamic Front on 22 November 2013

After three months of protests in 2011, many Islamist prisoners managed to be released from Sednaya Prison, including Zahran Alloush and Hassan Aboud. They formed their own Islamist groups and took up arms against the Syrian Government. Many of them became leaders of Islamist groups in the Islamic Front such as Jaysh al-Islam and Ahrar ash-Sham. Some of those groups formed an Islamist alliance named the Syrian Islamic Front. In November 2013, the Syrian Islamic Front was dissolved, as the organization was replaced by the Islamic Front.

On 22 November 2013, seven Islamist groups agreed to a pact that would dissolve the groups individually and lead to the formation of the Islamic Front. The groups were:

- Aleppo's largest opposition fighting force Al-Tawhid Brigade (formerly part of the Syrian Islamic Liberation Front)
- Salafist Ahrar ash-Sham (formerly part of the Syrian Islamic Front)
- Homs-based Liwa al-Haqq (formerly part of Syrian Islamic Front)
- Idlib-based Suqour al-Sham (formerly part of the Syrian Islamic Liberation Front)
- Damascus-based Jaysh al-Islam (formerly part of Syrian Islamic Liberation Front)
- Ansar al-Sham (formerly part of the Syrian Islamic Front)
- Kurdish Islamic Front

The Syrian Islamic Front tweeted that it had disbanded and its component groups would hereby operate under the Islamic Front. Not all groups in the Syrian Islamic Liberation Front joined the Islamic Front, although many of the key leaders of the SILF did. The Syrian Islamic Liberation Front announced its dissolution on 26 November 2013.

The leadership of the Islamic Front at the time of its founding was announced as Shura Council Leader: Ahmed Abu Issa (Suqour al-Sham), Deputy Shura Council Leader: Abu Omar Hreitan (Liwa al-Tawhid), General Secretary: Sheikh Abu Rateb (Liwa al-Haqq), Sharia Office: Abul-Abbas al-Shami (Ahrar ash-Sham), Political Office: Hassan Abboud (Ahrar ash-Sham) and Military Office: Zahran Alloush (Jaysh al-Islam)

A Liwa al-Tawhid member said the old names "will disappear and the groups will now melt [sic] into the new merger. There will be no such thing as Liwa al-Tawhid." The head of the group's Consultative Council, Amad Essa al-Sheikh, said the group sought "a paradigm shift in the armed rebellion by closing ranks and mobilising them to become the real alternative to the dying regime." He added that the group would cooperate with what it called "loyal fighters" in the country, including the Free Syrian Army (FSA). An anonymous spokesman for the group stated that it would not have ties with the Syrian National Coalition, although a member of the political bureau of the group, Ahmad Musa, stated that he hoped for recognition by the Syrian National Council in line with what he suggested "the Syrian people want. They want a revolution and not politics and foreign agendas." Despite non-recognition of the authority of the Syrian National Coalition, and criticism of the FSA's Supreme Military Council (SMC), the Islamic Front was aligned with other Syrian opposition-affiliated groups under the Syrian Revolutionary Command Council. However on 3 December 2013, Liwa al-Tawhid withdrew from the command of the FSA and criticized its leadership. On 6 December 2013, fighters from the Islamic Front seized several FSA bases and depots at the Bab al-Hawa crossing. This caused conflict between the two groups that lasted until later in December 2013.

The new group claimed 70,000 fighters, although it was estimated by Charles Lister of IHS Jane's that the total number of fighters the Islamic Front commanded on formation was at least 45,000.

=== Background ===
The formation of the front followed the death of Liwa al-Tawhid's military leader, Abdul Qader Saleh, from wounds a week earlier following an air strike in Aleppo, where he was meeting other leaders. A group member, Adil Fistok, said the planning was in the works for seven months; Fistok stated that "One of the major obstacles we faced was the lust for power by some leaders. But eventually everyone made concessions in order to make this project happen." According to him, the primary challenge was a lack of money and weapons.

=== Later events ===
In December 2013, the Islamic Front seized the FSA headquarters, along with key supply warehouses in Atmeh, as well as the nearby border crossing with Turkey at Bab al-Hawa. FSA Chief-of-Staff Brigadier General Salim Idris fled via Turkey to Doha, Qatar, during the assault. However, the FSA denied that Idris had left Syria, and said that the Islamic Front was asked to help the FSA fight against the Islamic State of Iraq and the Levant. The FSA confirmed on 13 December 2013 that the Islamic Front had obtained machine guns and ammunition that were not supposed to be in the possession of the Islamists. Later that month, however, the Islamic Front and the Free Syrian Army reconciled.

By early 2014, the Islamic Front had condemned the actions of the Islamic State of Iraq and the Levant; and some factions within the alliance attacked it. Several Islamic Front brigades, including Suqour al-Sham and Ahrar ash-Sham, developed internal divisions on how to or even whether to confront the Islamic State of Iraq and the Levant.

In May 2014, analyst Charles Lister estimated that the Front had 50,000-60,000 fighters, making it "largest and most militarily powerful alliance in Syria". Several defections from the Islamic Front to Free Syrian Army groups were reported in 2014, including around 800 fighters in eastern Aleppo Governorate in August 2014, with new FSA units created by the defectors, who condemned the Islamic Front's Islamist and sectarian practices, especially against Christians and Alawites who initially supported the opposition.

On 9 September 2014, Hassan Abboud, the Islamic Front's political leader, and Abu Abdulmalek al-Sharei, the head of the Islamic Front's Sharia Council, were killed along with many other senior Ahrar ash-Sham commanders, when a bomb went off as a high-level meeting was going on near an ammunition dump in Idlib province.

In 2014, several units left al-Tawhid Brigade, including the Elite Islamic Battalions and the 1st Regiment. There was also tension between Jaysh al-Islam and Ahrar al-Sham.

By March 2015, it was considered effectively defunct by analysts as one of its key components, Suqour al-Sham, merged into Ahrar al-Sham.

== Funding and international support ==
The group was widely reported to be backed and armed by Saudi Arabia, although other analysts have said there is little evidence for Saudi Arabian support for factions other than Jaysh al-Islam. Other constituent factions, principally the Tawhid Brigade, have been reported as Qatari-backed.

The Front has been widely reported as close to Turkey. The Turkish Prime Minister Recep Tayyip Erdoğan’s has been linked to some members in the Islamic Front (Syria). A leaked German intelligence document from May 2015 suggested the Islamic Front and Ahrar ash-Sham in particular had received weapons from Turkey. Other Terrorist groups had supported the Islamic Front (Syria). The Jabhat al-Nusra (JN) have publicity supported the Islamic Front (Syria) as long as the Islamic Front does not create any western ties or leave out Arab regimes. "Muhammad al-Mohaisany, a rising star in the jihadist community and a key financier of rebel efforts in northern Syria -- released a video message backing Islamic Front (Syria) on social media platforms." However, ISIS is feeling uneasy from the formation of the Islamic Front because they are competitors in Syria. The United States has not designated the Islamic Front (Syria) as a global jihadist group because they do not want to establish a caliphate. As a result, the United States government has not recognized the group to be a danger to American lives. However, many of the United States allies could back this group which politically could be an issue for the United States.

== Views and objectives ==
The Islamic Front released its charter on the Internet in late November 2013, outlining its aims and objectives, although the document avoided providing a clear vision of the future. The Islamic Front's charter rejects the concepts of representative democracy and secularism, instead seeking to establish an Islamic state ruled by a Majlis-ash-Shura and implementing sharia. It acknowledges the ethnic and religious minorities that live in Syria, while also welcoming the foreign fighters who have joined the anti-Assad forces and rejecting non-military means of ending the civil war. One member of the political assembly of the group has stated that the Islamic Front could accept Syria as a democracy, as long as sharia is "sovereign". The Islamic Front said it aspires "to establish an independent state where God's merciful law is sovereign and where the individuals of this state enjoy justice and a dignified life."

According to the Islamic Front, they only want to unify Muslims under one Islamic State. The group has stated that they will not punish non-Muslims. The Islamic Front (Syria) has been very open to allowing other smaller rebel groups join their movement as long as they share similar beliefs.

The Islamic Front criticized ISIS (Islamic State), saying: "They killed the people of Islam and leave the idol worshippers" and "They use the verses talking about the disbelievers and implement it on the Muslims".

In 2013, before the Front was formed, its future military leader Zahran Alloush gave a speech attacking Shi'ites, whom he called "Rafidis", the Alawites and "the Zoroastrians", saying "the mujahideen of al-Sham [the Levant] will wash the filth (رجس) of the Rafida and the Rafidia from al-Sham... if Allah wills it, until they cleanse Bilad al-Sham [the land of the Levant] from the filth of the Majous [Fireworshippers] who have fought the religion of Allah"; "Shia are still servile and small (أذلاء صاغرين ) throughout history"; and "I bid you, o unclean (أنجاس) Rafida, that as the Banu Umayya [ Umayyads] destroyed your skulls in the past, the people of the Ghouta and the people of al-Sham will destroy your skulls in the future".

Alloush and Hassan Aboud, heading the Islamic Front's political office, have denounced democracy and called for an Islamic state to succeed Assad. However in a May 2015 interview with McClatchy journalists, Alloush used moderate rhetoric, claiming that Syrians should decide what sort of state they wanted to live under and that Alawites were "part of the Syrian people" and only those with blood on their hands should be held accountable. His spokesman went on to claim that the sectarian and Islamist rhetoric Alloush had previously made was only intended for internal consumption and to rally his fighters.

== Claimed attacks/description of attacks ==
The Islamic Front (Syria) has claimed for forty five attacks from 2012 to 2015. The country that the Islamic Front (Syria) has been active in has only been in Syria and only in the major cities. The most deadly attacks occurred on the same day on 14 December 2014 on two different military bases. The Islamic Front killed ninety soldiers at each location and took fifteen soldiers hostage and their where about are still unknown to this day. The majority of their attacks are assaults with explosives (thirty seven attacks) but they have used armed assaults as well in their attacks as well (three times). The Majority of their targets were military personnel (twenty three attacks) but a close second was government officials (nineteen attacks); Forty three percent of the attacks were against military personnel, thirty five percent of the attacks were against government officials, and all other attacks involved were around twenty percent of the attacks.

== See also ==
- List of armed groups in the Syrian Civil War
