= Jaysh al-Islam =

Syrian Islamist Rebel Group

- جيش الإسلام
- Logo of Jaysh al-Islam
- Founding leader: Zahran Alloush †
- Military leader: Essam al-Buwaydhani (2015–2025); Abu Jamal (military chief)
- Political leader: Mohammed Alloush
- Spokesperson: Islam Alloush (former)
- Dates active: 2011–2013 (as Liwa al-Islam); 2013–2025 (as Jaysh al-Islam)
- Groups: Eastern Ghouta (until 14 April 2018): Military Council of Damascus and its Suburbs; Eastern Qalamoun Mountains (until 25 April 2018): 8th Brigade; Lions of the Asima Brigade; 7th Group; Southern Damascus: 17th Brigade
- Headquarters: Eastern Ghouta, in the Damascus suburb of Otaybah (until April 2018); Douma (until April 2018); Jarabulus (since April 2018)
- Active regions: Turkish-occupied areas in the Aleppo Governorate (since April 2018); Eastern Ghouta (until 14 April 2018); Southern Damascus; Greater Daraa area until 7 May 2018; Eastern Qalamoun Mountains (until 25 April 2018)
- Ideology: Sunni Islamism; Salafism; Salafi jihadism (until 2015); Democracy (from 2015); Syrian nationalism (officially since 2016)
- Size: 9,000 (December 2013); 20,000–25,000 (May 2015); 18,000 (December 2016); 10,000-15,000 fighters in Ghouta (February 2018)
- Part of: Free Syrian Army (2012-2013); Syrian Islamic Liberation Front (2012–2013); Islamic Front (2013–2015); Mujahideen Shura Council (2014–2015); Syrian Revolutionary Command Council (2014–2015); Unified Military Command of Eastern Ghouta (2014–2015) (Syrian opposition) Syrian National Army (2018–2025)
- Wars: the Syrian Civil War
- Website: www.jaishalislam.com

Jaysh al-Islam (Arabic: جيش الإسلام, romanized: Jayš al-ʾIslām, meaning Army of Islam), formerly known as Liwa al-Islam (Arabic: لواء الإسلام, Brigade of Islam), was a coalition of Islamist rebel units involved in the Syrian Civil War.

The group was part of the Free Syrian Army's Supreme Military Council until December 2013, but in November 2013 started the Syrian Islamic Front and the next month broke with the SMC and the Free Syrian Army.

Its primary base of operations was the Damascus area, particularly the city of Douma and the rest of the region of Eastern Ghouta, where Jaysh al-Islam was the largest rebel faction, as was Liwa al-Islam before. Following the fall of Ghouta to Assad's forces, Jaysh al-Islam retreated to areas controlled by the Turkish Backed Free Syrian Army, where it reportedly joined the FSA, after years of separation from FSA command.

The group along with Ahrar al-Sham was among the main rebel groups supported by Saudi Arabia. The group has promoted an Islamic state under Sharia law. In 2015, its then leader claimed in an interview to be seeking for the Syrian government to be replaced by a "technocratic body that represents the diversity of the Syrian people". After the fall of the Assad regime, the group has been incorporated into the newly installed Syrian Army under the transitional government, but its military leader Issam Bouidani (al-Buwaydhani) was arrested at Dubai International Airport in 2025.

== History ==
=== Liwa al-Islam ===
Liwa al-Islam was established by Zahran Alloush, the son of Saudi-based religious scholar Abdullah Mohammed Alloush, after Syrian authorities released him from prison in mid-2011, where he had been serving time for his Salafist The group claimed responsibility for carrying out the July 2012 Damascus bombing that killed Defense Minister Dawoud Rajiha, Deputy Defense Minister Assef Shawkat, and Assistant Vice President Hassan Turkmani. Liwa al-Islam was a driving force behind actions in the Damascus region. It cooperated and conducted joint operations with the al-Nusra Front.

=== Merger to form Jaysh al-Islam ===
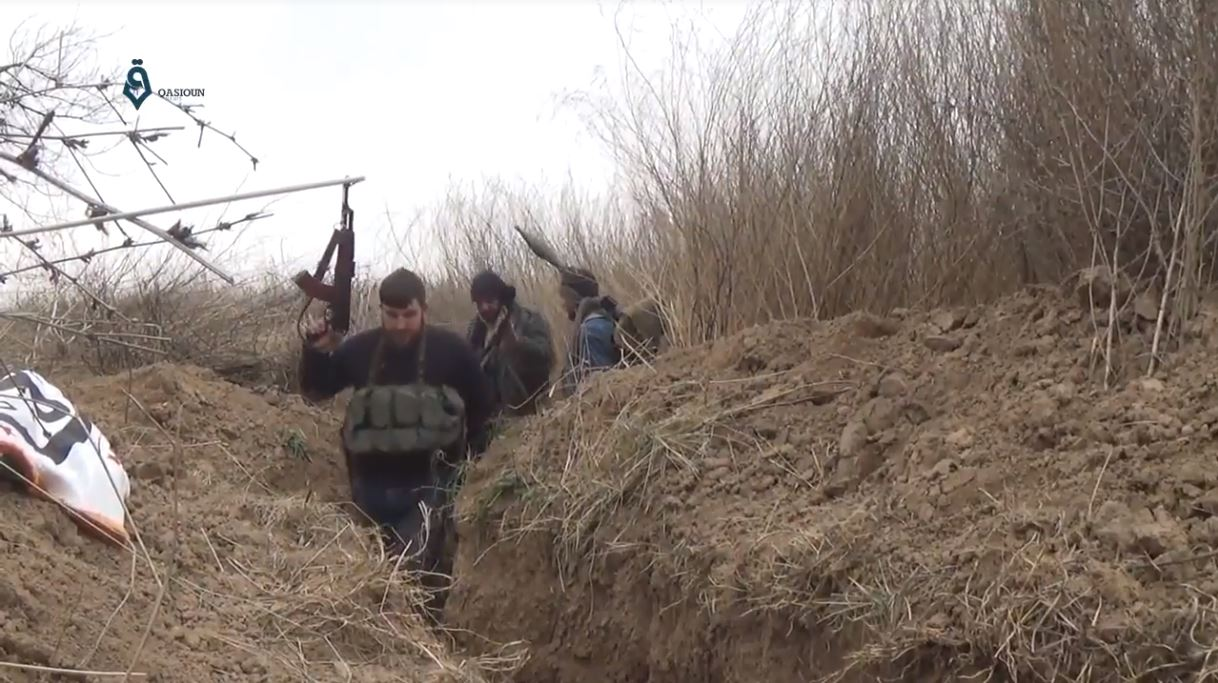
Jaysh al-Islam fighters during the Siege of Eastern Ghouta

On 29 September 2013, 50 rebel factions operating mostly around Damascus announced their merger into a new group called Jaysh al-Islam. Liwa al-Islam was the dominant faction in this merger, and its leader Zahran Alloush was announced as the leader of Jaysh al-Islam. Thirty-eight of the original groups listed as joining the merger were already members of, or affiliated with, Liwa al Islam. In September or earlier, Jaysh spokesman Islam Alloush had criticized the Syrian National Coalition, stating that the SNC should be led by those who are fighting in Syria rather than leaders in exile, but felt not (yet) inclined to outright break with the SNC.

By November 2013, 60 groups had merged into Jaysh al-Islam, and more than 175 rebel groups around Syria expressed a desire to join it.

The new group's creation was said to have been negotiated and spearheaded by Saudi Arabia, who believed that al-Nusra Front was gaining too much strength. After the merger, The Guardian reported that Saudi Arabia was preparing to give the group millions of dollars to "arm and train" its fighters, and use instructors from Pakistan to help train the group.

=== Break from SMC, founding the Syrian Islamic Front ===
While previously having been part of the Free Syrian Army's Supreme Military Council (SMC), in December 2013 Zahran Alloush announced his departure from that SMC, saying: "our affiliation to the Council came when it was coordinating operations against the Assad regime without being dependent on any other party, and when it had signed no pledges as to the makeup of a future state. However, when the FSA had come under the aegis of the Syrian National Coalition (in October 2013) which was committed to a democratic, pluralist state, Alloush – who had started the new Syrian Islamic Front of Islamist factions in November 2013 – decided he would no longer be part of the Supreme Military Council."

In March 2015, Jaysh al-Islam and the Unified Military Command of Eastern Ghouta formed the "Military Council of Damascus and its Suburbs", under the direct command of Zahran Alloush. (Note: Not to be confused with the Damascus Military Council which also had the same name.)

On 26 April 2015, they established the Fatah Halab joint operations room along with other major Aleppo based groups.

Until late 2015, Jaysh al-Islam at times cooperated with the Al-Nusra Front.

=== Death of leader Zahran Alloush ===
Zahran Alloush watches Jaysh al-Islam recruits during a military parade with a captured T-72AV

On 25 December 2015, the group's founder Zahran Alloush was killed, along with several other leaders of the group, in a Syrian air strike on the suburbs of Damascus. Abu Hammam Bouwaidani succeeded him as leader.

=== Developments, 2016–2018 ===
The organisations rule over Douma and Ghouta was characterised by the imposition of a highly religious, corrupt and oppressive regime, where "its leadership [lived] in luxury and utmost privilege while the people of Douma and Ghouta were starving." Jaysh al-Islam's rule compelled many in the region to stay in Ba'athist occupied territories to avoid them.

Since the death of Zahran Alloush in late 2015, there have been conflicts between Jaysh al-Islam and other members of the Unified Military Command of Eastern Ghouta, along with associated groups such as Al-Nusra Front and its Jaish al-Fustat operations room. Ahrar al-Sham has remained neutral. Intra-rebel fighting in Ghouta took place in May 2016, with 300 deaths. On 24 May 2016, leaders of Jaysh al-Islam and al-Rahman Legion met to sign a peace deal to end hostilities.

On 25 January 2017, Jaysh al-Islam's Idlib branch joined Ahrar al-Sham.

In April 2017 a coalition of the Al-Rahman Legion and Tahrir al-Sham encroached on the area of Eastern Ghouta controlled by Jaysh, which launched a campaign to drive them out, resulting in 95 casualties between 26 April and 1 May. The clashes enabled the Syrian Army to make advances in eastern Damascus. Demonstrators called for an end to the fighting; video footage circulated at the end of April appeared to show Jaysh al-Islam fighters opening fire on demonstrators who called for an end to the rebel infighting.

On 12 April 2018, some 13,000 Jaysh al-Islam fighters with their families have evacuated the town of Douma in buses, thus surrendering that town to the Assad government. Jaysh fighters and their families have resettled in northern Syria, in the Aleppo countryside, where they operate out of Jarabulus under the Turkish-backed Free Syrian Army.

=== Post-Assad era ===
Following the fall of the Assad regime in December 2024, Jaysh al-Islam was integrated into the reorganised Syrian military, with its leader, Essam al-Buwaydhani, becoming an official in the Ministry of Defense as the commander of the 70th Division.

== Ideology ==
Since 2015, Jaysh al-Islam has called for the Syrian government to be replaced by a technocratic body that represents the diversity of the Syrian people.
In 2016, Jaysh al-Islam's ideology was described as a "mixture" of Salafism, Syrian nationalism, "and at least in the past, a significant dose of Sunni sectarianism":

Zahran Alloush initially called for the establishment of an Islamic state in Syria but later renounced his previous positions, expressed support for an elected government, boasted about the protection his organization offers to Christians under its rule and even defined the Alawi sect as a victim of the Assad regime.

As an example of the earlier sectarianism, in 2013 or earlier, Alloush in a speech suggested that "Sham" or Bilad al-Sham (the Levant or specifically Damascus) should be "cleansed of the filth" of the Shi'ites (whom he called "Rafida" = rejectionists) and Alawites (whom he called "Nusayris" or "Majous" = Zoroastrians, pre-Islamic Persians): "And I give you the news, oh unclean Rafida: Just as the Umayyads crushed your heads in the past, the people of Ghouta and Sham will crush them soon, they will make you taste a painful torment in this world, before God makes you taste it in the hereafter".

In that early period, Alloush condemned democracy and called for an Islamic state to succeed the tyrant Assad. However, in a May 2015 interview with McClatchy journalists, Alloush used less debatable rhetoric, claiming that Syrians should decide what sort of state they wanted to live under and that Alawites were "part of the Syrian people" and only those with blood on their hands should be held accountable. His spokesman went on to claim that the sectarian and Islamist rhetoric Alloush had previously made was only intended for internal consumption and to rally his fighters.

== Flags ==
Flags of Jaysh al-Islam
Flag of Jaysh al-Islam (White)

Flag of Jaysh al-Islam (Black)

The Syrian independence flag used officially by Jaysh al-Islam since 2017.

== Notable incidents ==
=== Reported capture of sophisticated equipment from the Syrian government ===
On late 2012, Liwa al-Islam (later Jaysh al-Islam) captured at least five 9K33 Osa surface-to-air missile launchers in Eastern Ghouta, three of them in operational condition, with 12 missiles total. (Note: The source is ambiguous about whether all missiles were functional.) A video was posted on 29 July 2013, depicting some of the missiles being used to shoot down a Syrian government Mil Mi-8. In November 2013, the group captured two training-jets (L-39s used by the government as jet fighters) from the Syrian Air Force and showed them on the runway. But so far, they haven't been used in combat.

=== Torture of prisoners ===
In March 2016, Syria Deeply reported: "...the leader of Jaysh al-Islam, or "Army of Islam" was killed in December last year in a government air strike. His death, however, did nothing to stop to the group's totalitarian rule in Eastern Ghouta, where residents say torture and imprisonment without trial occur routinely in the name of "liberation" and Sharia law."

=== Filmed execution of alleged ISIL members ===
From approximately January 2014 until July 2015, Jaysh was fiercely fighting ISIL, especially in the Ghouta belt around Damascus. In revenge for ISIL's beheading of Jaysh members and releasing a video recording of the event in June 2015, Jaysh al-Islam's website published a video that showed its fighters executing 18 alleged ISIL militants by shotgun. The video mimics the imagery that ISIL has used for similar filmed executions; however, it reversed the imagery by having the executioners wearing orange prisoner outfits (reminiscent of the jumpsuits victims of ISIS would wear before their untimely executions) and the victims being dressed in black robes. ‘Qariban qariba’, a song used by ISIS in many of their videos played throughout the execution, albeit the lyrics altered to denounce the group (for example, it says "With the accusations of apostasy they shed blood" in reference to ISIS killing innocents and civilians). The video included some English subtitles.

=== Attack on Adra Prison ===
In August and September 2015, Jaysh al-Islam shelled and stormed Adra Prison in north-east Damascus. As of 12 September 2015, it had taken control of two buildings.

=== Use of captives as human shields ===
On 1 November 2015, an opposition media outlet, Shaam News Network, posted a video showing Jaysh al-Islam militants had locked people in cages and spread out 100 cages containing about 7 captives each through Eastern Ghouta, northeast of Damascus, to use them as human shields against Syrian government air raids. According to the Syrian Observatory for Human Rights, the caged people being used as human shields were captured Alawite military officers and their families who had been kidnapped by Jaysh al-Islam two years ago outside Adra al-Ummaliyah, a government-held neighbourhood in Eastern Ghouta. However, Jaysh al-Islam has not yet claimed responsibility for either of these alleged actions and The New York Times has suggested the possibility that these 'hostages on public display' were a mere show, to sway public opinion against further government and Russian bombardments on Eastern Ghouta.

=== Alleged use of chemical weapons ===
On 7 April 2016, the Sheikh Maqsood neighborhood in Aleppo was shelled with mortars that may have contained chemical agents. On 8 April, a spokesman for the rebel group said that "weapons not authorized for use in these types of confrontations" had been used against Kurdish militia and civilians in Aleppo. He stated that "One of our commanders has unlawfully used a type of weapon that is not included in our list". He did not specify what substances were used but, according to Kurdish Red Crescent, the symptoms were consistent with the use of chlorine gas or other agents. Welat Memo, a physician with the Kurdish Red Crescent, said that the people affected are "vomiting and having difficulty in breathing." Spokesperson for the Kurdish People's Protection Units (YPG) said that Jaysh al-Islam's "statement came after many conclusive evidences and reports of chemical gas being used in shelling Aleppo's Sheikh Maqsoud district". He also said that the group has attacked the Kurdish neighborhood of Aleppo with "forbidden weapons" many times since the war's start. Jaysh al-Islam subsequently clarified that it was referring to "modified Grad rockets," not chemical weapons.

== Foreign reactions ==
=== Egypt, Iran, Russia ===
Stanford University's Mapping Militant Organizations project records that Jaysh al-Islam is not designated as a terrorist organization by any major national government or international body. However, it notes that Russia, Lebanon, and Egypt have supported classifying it as such since the end of 2015. Later, however, JaI was designated "moderate opposition" in a December 2016 list released by the Russian defence ministry, and participated in the Russian-backed Astana talks.

=== U.S. (Obama administration) ===
Jaysh al-Islam's relationship with the United States has remained mixed. Former U.S. Secretary of State John Kerry, in a speech in Aspen, Colorado on 28 June 2016, mentioned Jaysh al-Islam and Ahrar al-Sham as "subgroups" of "the terrorists" ISIL and Jabhat al-Nusra. US Obama administration officials disapproved this mention and told The Washington Post, who speculated that Kerry's comment may have been accidental, that it was inaccurate and could harm U.S. government efforts to convince the Russian and the Syrian governments not to attack Jaysh al-Islam and Ahrar al-Sham. The Post also reported that "Syrian [opposition] groups" saw Kerry's comments as an example of how the Obama administration has slowly moved toward the Russian view of Syria, which includes painting all opposition groups as terrorist organizations in order to justify attacking them.

The US State Department in July 2016 confirmed that the US administration's policy with regard to Jaysh al-Islam had not changed: Jaysh was and is not a UN-designated terrorist group, is opposed to ISIL, and is not allied to Nusra.

== See also ==
- Douma massacre (2015)
- List of armed groups in the Syrian Civil War
