= Liwa al-Haqq (Homs) =

Armed Islamist insurgent group, 2012–2014

- لواء الحق
- Liwa al-Haqq logo
- Leader: Sheikh Abu Rateb
- Dates active: 11 August 2012–8 December 2014
- Groups: katibat al-Furati; Kataeb Atbaa al-Rasoul; Katibat al-Ansar
- Active regions: Homs Governorate, Syria
- Ideology: Sunni Islamism; Salafism; Jihadism (until 2014)
- Part of: Islamic Front; Syrian Islamic Front (formerly); Syrian Revolutionary Command Council

Liwa al-Haqq (Arabic: لواء الحق, meaning "Right Brigade") was an armed Islamist insurgent group that was active during the Syrian Civil War in the Homs region.

On 11 August 2012, a group of Islamist-leaning brigades in Homs formed Liwa al-Haqq, which went on to become in the next year one of the most prominent fighting groups in the area. Important sub-units include Katibat al-Furati, Kataeb Atbaa al-Rasoul and Katibat al-Ansar.

In December 2012, Liwa al-Haqq joined with other insurgent groups to form the Syrian Islamic Front umbrella organization, in November 2013 the SIF was dissolved and Liwa al-Haqq, Ansar al-Sham and Ahrar al-Sham joined the broader Islamic Front alliance.

By April 2014, Liwa al-Haqq had reportedly been weakened in the wake of advances made by the Syrian military in the Homs region, and it merged with Ahrar al-Sham in December 2014.

== See also ==
- List of armed groups in the Syrian Civil War
