= Adra Prison =

Prison in Damascus, Syria, closed in 2024

- Interactive map of Adra Prison
- Location: northeast outskirts of Damascus, Syria; 33.5901037°N 36.4404945°E
- Capacity: 2,500
- Population: 7,000 (2014)

Notable prisoners
- Anwar al-Bunni, Bassel Khartabil, Mas'ud Hamid, Haitham al-Maleh

Adra Prison (Arabic: سجن عدرا) is a prison in Syria, on the northeast outskirts of Damascus. Political prisoners are held in the prison, along with a mixture of civil prisoners such as traffic offenders, murderers, and drug dealers. In 2014, the prison held more than 7,000 inmates, a dozen of them women, in space designed for 2,500. The Washington Post referred to the prison as "infamous".

== History ==
=== Pre-civil war ===
Ghassan Najjar, an engineer who was imprisoned in 1980, reportedly went on two hunger strikes, one to protest conditions in the prison. His fellow inmates said he was beaten so badly by prison guards trying to force him to eat that he suffered spinal injuries.

Mas'ud Hamid, a Kurdish journalism student, was held in solitary confinement in the prison for one year from 2003 to 2004 before he was allowed monthly visits, and Human Rights Watch said that interrogators reportedly tortured him and beat him with a studded whip on the bottom of his feet. His room was 2 by 0.85 metres (6 ft 7 in × 2 ft 9 in), largely filled by a toilet in it.

In December 2004, Kurds in the prison conducted a hunger strike, which was allegedly halted by torture.

=== Amid civil war ===
In March 2011, 13 prisoners at the prison, including 80-year-old former judge Haitham al-Maleh and lawyer Anwar al-Bunni began a hunger strike to protest government oppression and the holding of political prisoners.

On 1 July 2013, female detainees in the prison began hunger strike in response to negligence of their cases by the public prosecution of the Counterterrorism Court, and absence of approval of their respective trials.

As of December 2014, the jail was well beyond its 2,500 person capacity at over 7,000 prisoners of all types of accused offenders, from murderers to traffic violators.

In August and September 2015, Jaysh al-Islam shelled and stormed the prison, taking control of two buildings.

=== Post-regime ===
On 7 December 2024, the prison was liberated by the Southern Operations Room during the Fall of Damascus. On 13 December 2024, the United States charged Samir Ousman Alsheikh with human rights abuses during the time that he ran the prison from 2005 to 2008. On 16 March 2026, Samir Alsheikh was found guilty of torture and conspiracy to commit torture during his time as head of the prison. In September 2026, he was sentenced to 60 years in U.S. federal prison.

Later on, the prison was used to detain former Syrian government soldiers and officers after the fall of Damascus. The Syrian Observatory for Human Rights reported severe overcrowding, poor health conditions, lack of medical care, and ill-treatment of detainees, including humiliation and coerced confessions. In addition, a number of detainees from Suweida Governorate held at the prison since the southern Syria clashes began an open-ended hunger strike in late December 2025 to protest their arbitrary detention and poor humanitarian conditions, demanding their release and access to medical care.

== Former prisoners ==
- Anwar al-Bunni
- Mas'ud Hamid
- Haitham al-Maleh
- Bassel Khartabil
- Ragheed al-Tatari

== See also ==
- Tadmor Prison
