= Essam al-Buwaydhani =

Syrian rebel leader (1971–present)

- عصام البويضاني
- Born: 1971; Douma, Syria
- Military career
- Allegiance: Syrian opposition (until 2024); Syria (since 2025)
- Branch: Jaysh al-Islam (until 2025); Syrian Army (since 2025)
- Unit: 70th Division (since 2025)
- Conflicts: Syrian Civil War; Rif Dimashq offensive (February–April 2018)

Essam al-Buwaydhani (also rendered as Issam Bouidani), better known with his kunya Abu Hammam al-Buwaydhani (Arabic: أبو همام البويضاني) is a Syrian military officer and former rebel leader. He was reportedly born in Douma and was a businessman by profession. He was elected leader of Jaysh al-Islam after Zahran Alloush, the previous leader of the group, was killed in an air strike in December 2015.

Following the fall of the Assad regime, Buwaydhani and other rebel leaders, met with Hay'at Tahrir al-Sham head Ahmed al-Sharaa in December 2024 at a conference in Damascus, where they agreed to dissolve their factions. Buwaydhani then became an official in the Ministry of Defense.

He was appointed by the transitional government to lead the 70th Division of the Syrian Army, which operates in the eastern Rif Dimashq Governorate.

== Arrest and release ==
On 24 April 2025, Buwaydhani was arrested at Dubai International Airport while exiting the United Arab Emirates. He was reported to have entered the country for private reasons using a Turkish passport.

On 22 September 2025, the family of Buwaydhani, along with a group of citizens, held a protest in front of the United Arab Emirates embassy in Damascus, calling for his release following his detention several months earlier at an airport in the UAE.

On 23 April 2026, Buwaydhani was released after a visit from Syrian President Ahmed al-Sharaa to the United Arab Emirates.
