= Syrian Islamic Front =

2012–2013 Syrian Islamist umbrella organisation

Syrian Islamic Front الجبهة الإسلامية السورية Al-Jabha Al-Islamiyya Al-Suriyya
- Logo of the Syrian Islamic Front
- Leader: Hassan Aboud (Ahrar ash-Sham)
- Dates active: December 2012 – November 2013
- Groups: Ahrar al-Sham; Ansar al-Sham; Liwa al-Haqq; Kurdish Islamic Front; Hamza ibn Abdulmutallib Brigade; Al-Fajr Islamic Movement; Jaysh Al-Tawhid; Mus'ab ibn Umayr Brigade; Faith Brigade; Special Forces Unit; Islamic Vangaurd; Eagles of Islam; Haqq Battalions Gathering (Merged with Other Groups to Become Liwa Mujahidi al-Sham)
- Active regions: Syria
- Ideology: Salafi Islamism; Syrian nationalism Jihadism
- Size: 25,000 (Dec. 2012, own claim) – 13,000 (May 2013)
- Wars: Syrian Civil War

The Syrian Islamic Front (Arabic: الجبهة الإسلامية السورية al-Jabhah al-Islāmiyya as-Sūriyyah; abbreviated SIF) was a Salafist alliance of various Islamist factions opposed to Bashar al-Assad that sought the transformation of Syria into an Islamic state under Sharia.

Its largest group was the Salafist Ahrar al-Sham, which reportedly "led" and "dominated" the Front. In November 2013, the Syrian Islamic Front was dissolved, as the organization was replaced by the Islamic Front.

== Background ==
The group was founded by eleven Islamist rebel groups on 21 December 2012, including: Ahrar al-Sham, Al-Haqq Brigade in Homs, the Al-Fajr Islamic Movement in Aleppo, Ansar al-Sham in Latakia, Jaysh Al-Tawhid in Deir ez-Zor and Al-Hasakah and the Hamza ibn 'Abd al-Muttalib Brigade in Damascus. In January 2013 several of the member organisations announced that they were uniting with Ahrar ash-Sham into a broader group called Harakat Ahrar al-Sham al-Islamiyya (The Islamic Movement of Ahrar al-Sham). In April 2013, the Haqq Battalions Gathering of Hama Governorate became the first new member to join the Front since its founding, in August 2013 this group was merged with several other Salafist rebel groups in Hama to form a new SIF member unit called Liwa Mujahidi al-Sham. The SIF did not include the jihadist Al-Nusra Front, which had been declared a terrorist organisation by the United States. On 9 August, SOHR reported that Hassan Aboud, the head of Ahrar al-Sham, an ultraconservative Syrian rebel group, was killed in the northwestern town of Ram Hamdan in the Syrian of Idlib Governorate.

== Operations ==
The SIF had reportedly "established a presence across wide swathes of Syrian territory, notably in the north." Apart from its military operations in the Syrian Civil War, the SIF, and particularly Ahrar al-Sham, diverted considerable resources into humanitarian and other social activities in areas of Syria that they had influence. This included the provision of Islamic education to children, and the distribution of food, water, and fuel. These humanitarian activities were partially subsidized by the IHH Humanitarian Relief Foundation and Qatar charity. The SIF's leader, Hassan Aboud, revealed himself and his real name for the first time in an 8 June 2013 interview with Al Jazeera. In the interview, Aboud claimed that the SIF ran training camps across Syria for recruits to receive military and religious instruction, as well as additional camps to train promising recruits to become commanders. Aboud also claimed that they had received dozens of requests from other rebel groups to join the SIF.

== Ideology, positions ==
The front's founding statement described its ideology as based on a Salafi understanding of Islam and declared its aims as toppling the Assad government and establishing an Islamic state, governed by religious Muslim law, for the benefit of all Syrians. The group received funding and support from other conservative Salafis in the Persian Gulf, prominent donors included the Kuwaiti preacher Hajjaj al-Ajami, Saudi-based Syrian preacher Adnan al-Aroor, and Kuwaiti politician Hakim al-Mutayri. The Front was "considered less extreme" than the radical Syrian groups such as Jabhat al-Nusra that had been "designated as terrorist organizations" by the United States, and "probably has broader support among ordinary Syrians", according to Washington Post journalist Liz Sly. The Front opposed US intervention against the al-Assad government, and on 5 September 2013, it issued a statement on its Facebook page stating that it rejected "Western military intervention in Syria and consider it a new aggression against Muslims", saying that would only serve American interests and not the cause of those seeking to topple al-Assad.

On 22 November leaders in the SIF took part in the declaration of the new Islamic Front uniting rebel groups that had previously operated under the banners of the SIF and the Syrian Islamic Liberation Front. The SIF then announced on its Google Plus account that it was disbanding and that its component groups would henceforth operate under the umbrella of the Islamic Front.

== See also ==
- List of armed groups in the Syrian Civil War
