= Deir ez-Zor offensive (January–February 2017) =

Military operation

Coordinates: 35.3333°N 40.1500°E

- Part of the Battle of Deir ez-Zor and the Russian military intervention in the Syrian civil war
- The situation in Deir ez-Zor, as of 19 January 2017 Syrian Government control control Islamic State of Iraq and the Levant
Date	14 January – 14 February 2017 (1 month)
Location	Deir ez-Zor Governorate, Syria
Result	ISIL victory: ISIL cut the road to Deir ez-Zor Airport, splitting the government-held areas of Deir ez-Zor into two parts

Belligerents
Islamic State of Iraq and the Levant	(Syria) Syrian Arab Republic; Russia

Commanders and leaders
Unknown Deir ez-Zor ISIL emir †	(Syria) Issam Zahreddine (Syria) Mohammad Khaddour

Units involved
Military of ISIL: Wilayat al-Khair	Syrian Arab Armed Forces; Syrian Arab Army; Republican Guard: 104th Airborne Brigade; 17th Reserve Division: 137th Mechanized Brigade; 121st Artillery Regiment; Syrian Arab Air Force; National Defense Forces; Russian Armed Forces: Russian Air Force

Strength
14,000 (pro-government claim)	4,000 Syrian soldiers

Casualties and losses
241 killed (per SOHR); 500 killed (per SAA)	1,400 killed or wounded (per SOHR)
- Hundreds of civilians killed (per SOHR)

The Deir ez-Zor offensive (January–February 2017) was a military operation launched by the Islamic State of Iraq and the Levant (ISIL) against the Syrian Armed Forces, to capture the city of Deir ez-Zor, on 14 January 2017. The offensive came amid the group losing large amounts of territory in the Raqqa offensive as well as the Turkish military intervention in Syria, while Iraqi forces were advancing in its Iraq headquarters in Mosul. It ended with the city being split into two parts.

== Background ==
Deir ez-Zor is the capital of Deir ez-Zor Governorate and lies in an oil-rich region. The city was besieged by ISIL since January 2015 when ISIL severed all land routes to the city. An estimated 100,000 civilians were besieged in the government-controlled areas.

== The offensive ==
ISIL began the offensive on 14 January 2017, launching its heaviest assault yet on Syrian Arab Army-held areas of the city. At least 12 soldiers and two civilians were killed in the attack, while 20 ISIL fighters were killed in air strikes according to Syrian Observatory for Human Rights (SOHR). The aim of the attack was to cut the road between Deir ez-Zor Airport and the city. SAA however launched a counter-attack and repelled ISIL's attack. The group advanced around the city's cemetery and in points around the airbase during the day.

ISIL continued its offensive on the next day and launched car bombs on checkpoints controlled by pro-government forces. They then shelled Tallat al-Brouk district and the town of Bagheliya, reportedly capturing both after pro-government forces evacuated. At the same time, they also stormed and captured Sakan al-Jahiziya neighborhood on the highway between the city and Damascus. ISIL also advanced along the Jam’eyyat al-Rowwad and captured a strategic mountain overlooking the city. SOHR meanwhile stated ISIL had captured Assad Hospital, but according to local sources, the army recaptured the Assad Hospital and Al-Masdar News cited local sources stating that ISIL never captured it. The Syrian Army backed by the Syrian Arab Air Force later launched a counter-attack in the following night and managed to repel ISIL away from its frontlines. More than 80 people including 28 pro-government fighters, at least 40 ISIL fighters and 14 civilians were reported killed according to SOHR by the end of the second day.

ISIL launched another attack on 16 January and succeeded in cutting the road linking the airbase to the city, leaving the government enclave split in two. The group also captured the al-Jaryah residential project. Heavy clashes were also reported around the provincial cemetery and a road junction known locally as the Panorama Roundabout, and later this day, ISIL reportedly captured the cemetery. The clashes forced the United Nations to suspend food airdrops to the city.

The Syrian Army and its allies, backed by the Russian Air Force and Syrian Arab Air Force, launched a counter-attack and clashed against ISIL on 17 January. On the night of 17 January, the Syrian Air Force managed to transport around 200 reinforcements to the besieged city via helicopters.

On January 18, clashes were reported to take place to the northwest of Deir ez-Zor, near Tal Barouk and the university housing area. Meanwhile, the Syrian and Russian airforces were reported to bomb the cemetery area and Mount Tharda. ISIL captured the power plant to the west of the airbase during the day. The group set tires and barrels of crude oil on fire to create a smokescreen in order to prevent airstrikes on their positions. It also executed 10 soldiers it had captured.

ISIL clashed with the Army in al-Rasafa, al-Ommal, al-Mowazzafin, al-Jabilah and Rashdiyyah districts as well in the area around the airbase and the Panorama Roundabout on 19 January. It advanced in al-Mowazzafin, al-Ommal and Rasafa as well as around the airbase.

ISIL carried out a large night-time attack on 20 January, targeting the airport. The next day, the Russian Air Force began using strategic bombers in order to support Syrian forces in the city. This enabled the Army to capture several points in the cemetery and Panorama Roundabout in a counter-attack.

An ISIL assault in the Panorama area, south of the city, was repelled by the Army on 22 January. A counter-attack was later launched by them and their allies, helping them to advance around the cemetery and the surrounding hills, including capturing the strategic cemetery hill. Heavy clashes took place in the cemetery area and around the Panorama area with warplanes carrying out many raids around the city on 23 January. On the next day, ISIL reportedly advanced in the vicinity of Brigade 137.

On the night of 23/24 January, around 500 Syrian soldiers were successfully transported to the besieged city in a joint Syrian-Russian aerial operation which involved 22 transport helicopters as well as additional support aircraft.

During 26 January, the Al-Qassem Group together with 104th Airborne Brigade of the Republican Guard continued clashing with ISIL over the cemetery, at the end of the day controlling two-thirds of the area.

== Aftermath ==
On 18 February, an ISIL attack on the Panorama checkpoint was repelled. Three days later, the 104th Brigade of the Republican Guard captured Alloush hill, coming within 1,500 meters of lifting the siege on the Airport.

== See also ==
- September 2016 Deir ez-Zor air raid
- Deir ez-Zor clashes (disambiguation)
  - Deir ez-Zor offensive (December 2014)
  - Deir ez-Zor offensive (January 2016)
