= Deir ez-Zor Governorate campaign =

Military operation

- Part of the Syrian civil war and Aftermath of the Syrian civil war
- Map of Syria with Deir ez-Zor Governorate highlighted.
Date	26 November 2011 – 18 January 2026 (14 years, 1 month, 3 weeks and 2 days)
Location	Deir ez-Zor Governorate, Syria
Result	Syrian transitional government victory: Siege of Deir ez-Zor broken in September 2017.; SAA captures the city of Deir ez-Zor by November 2017.; SDF captures the majority of the Euphrates' eastern bank.; Eventual territorial defeat of ISIS by March 2019.; Continued IS low-level insurgency.; Sporadic conflict between the SAA and SDF.; Ba'athist Syrian and Russian forces withdrawal from Deir ez-Zor; SDF completely take over the city of Deir ez-Zor.; SDF captures the 7 villages of the "Khasham Pocket" on the east bank of the Euphrates.; Opposition forces takeover the city of Deir ez-Zor after the fall of the Assad regime.; SDF completely withdrew from the governorate following a ceasefire with the Syrian transitional government.

Belligerents
Ba'athist Syria (surrendered) Hezbollah (surrendered) Iran (until 2024) Russia (until 2024) (Iraq) Iraqi Shi'a militias intervention (until 2024)	Syrian opposition (2011–2024): (Syrian opposition) Free Syrian Army; Tahrir al-Sham; (Syria) Syrian transitional government (2024–2026): Ministry of Defense	Rojava CJTF–OIR; (Syrian opposition) Revolutionary Commando Army (until 2024)	Islamic State

Units involved
- See below

The Deir ez-Zor Governorate campaign of the Syrian civil war consists of several battles and offensives fought across the governorate of Syria:

- Deir ez-Zor clashes (2011–2014)
  - 2012 Deir ez-Zor bombing
  - Hatla massacre
- Battle of Deir ez-Zor (2014–2017)
  - Deir ez-Zor offensive (April–July 2014)
  - Deir ez-Zor offensive (December 2014)
  - Deir ez-Zor offensive (2016)
  - September 2016 Deir ez-Zor air raid
  - Deir ez-Zor offensive (January–February 2017)
  - Central Syria campaign (2017)
    - 2017 Deir ez-Zor missile strike
    - Deir ez-Zor offensive (September–November 2017)
- 2016 Abu Kamal offensive
- Raqqa campaign (2016–2017) (the SDF first entered Deir ez-Zor Governorate)
- Syrian Desert campaign (December 2016–April 2017)
- Deir ez-Zor campaign (2017–2019)
  - Battle of Khasham
  - Battle of Hajin
  - Battle of Baghuz Fawqani
- Eastern Syria campaign (September–December 2017)
  - 2017 Euphrates Crossing offensive
  - 2017 Mayadin offensive
  - 2017 Abu Kamal offensive
- Syrian Desert campaign (December 2017–present)
  - Deir ez-Zor offensive (May–June 2018)
- Deir ez-Zor Governorate clashes (April 2018)
- Eastern Syria insurgency
- Iranian strike on Hajin
- Deir ez-Zor clashes (2023)
- Deir ez-Zor offensive (2024)
- 2026 northeastern Syria offensive

== Order of battle ==
=== Pro-government forces ===
Ba'athist Syria

- Syrian Arab Armed Forces
  - Syrian Army
    - 1st Armoured Division
    - 3rd Armoured Division
      - Qalamoun Shield Forces
    - 4th Armoured Division
      - 38th Brigade
    - 5th Corps
      - ISIS Hunters
    - 17th Division
    - 18th Armoured Division
      - 137th Brigade
    - Republican Guard
      - 104th Brigade
      - 800th Regiment
    - Tiger Forces
  - Syrian Air Force
  - National Defence Forces
    - Baqir Brigade
    - Lions of Hussein
- Military Intelligence Directorate
  - Military Security Shield Forces
  - Forces of the Fighters of the Tribes

Hezbollah

- Lebanese Hezbollah
  - Radwan Force
- Syrian Hezbollah
  - Imam Mahdi Scouts from Nubl
  - Hezbollah Rocket Division

Russia (since 2015)

- Russian Armed Forces
  - Russian Ground Forces
    - 29th Army
      - 200th Artillery Brigade
    - Special Operations Forces
  - Russian Aerospace Forces
    - Russian Air Force
  - Russian Navy
- Wagner Group
  - 5 Storm unit

Iran (since 2013)

- Iranian Armed Forces
  - Islamic Revolutionary Guard Corps
    - Aerospace Force of the Islamic Revolutionary Guard Corps
    - Quds Force

PMF-affiliated militias

- Kata'ib al-Imam Ali
- Harakat Hezbollah al-Nujaba
  - 12th Mechanized Brigade
- Kata'ib Sayyid al-Shuhada
- Kata'ib Hezbollah
- Asa'ib Ahl al-Haq
  - Kafeel Zaynab Brigade

Iraq (since 2017, against ISIS only)

- Iraqi Air Force

Other armed groups:

- Shabiha (2011–12, merged into NDF)
- Liwa Abu al-Fadhal al-Abbas (2011–14, rebel claim)
- Foreign Shia groups
  - Liwa Fatemiyoun
  - Liwa Zainebiyoun
- Syrian Resistance
  - Falcons of the Jazira and Euphrates
- Palestinian groups
  - Al-Quds Brigade
  - Galilee Forces
  - Fatah al-Intifada
  - Free Palestine Movement
- Sootoro
- Allied local tribes
  - Al-Shaitat
  - Al-Baggara

=== Rebel forces ===
(Syria) Free Syrian Army/SNC-aligned units

The rebel units in eastern Syria were originally largely independent and unorganized, until many accepted the authority of the National Coalition for Syrian Revolutionary and Opposition Forces (SNC) in late 2012. The authority of the SNC remained mostly nominal, however, and by late 2013 this alliance already began to disintegrate again.

- 3rd Infantry Division
- 4th Infantry Division
- 5th Commando Division
- 7th Division
- 11th Division
- Liwa Jund al-Rahman
- Liwa Chouhada' Deïr ez-Zor
- Ahfad al-Rasul Brigade
- Liwa al-Khadra'
- Liwa al-Abbas
- Liwa al-Qadisiya
- Liwa al-Muhajirin ila Allah
- Lions of Al Jazeera
- Retribution Army
- Al-Tawhid Brigade

(Syria) Mujahideen and Islamists

Over time, several units left the SNC alliance due to differences, and formed new, often more Islamist coalitions. Nevertheless, these new alliances generally remained allied with the council.

- Harakat Abna' al-Islam
  - Jaysh Al-Tawhid (also member of the Syrian Islamic Front)
  - Kata'ib al-Ansar
  - Kata'ib al-Sa’iqa
- Jaysh Ahl as-Sunna wa-l-Jama’a (formed from former Authenticity and Development Front member groups)
  - Liwa al-Athar
  - Liwa Usud as-Sunna
  - Liwa Ahl al-Raya
- Jabhat al-Jihad wal-Bina' al-Islamiyya (under command of the Islamic Court of Deir ez-Zor)
  - Liwa Jaf’ar al-Tayyar
  - Liwa la Ilaha illa Allah
  - Liwa al-Hawaz, Liwa Ibn Qiam
  - Liwa al-Risalla
  - Liwa al-Tawhid al-Islami
  - Liwa Othman bin Afan
  - Liwa Ahfad Mohammad
  - Liwa Sarayat al-Rasoul
  - Liwa Sadiq al-Amin
  - Tajamm’u al-Rachidin
- Brigade of al-Qaka

Radical jihadists

Besides the SNC and the allied Islamist coalitions, there were also number of radical jihadist groups active in Deir ez-Zor; though they normally also cooperated with other, more moderate rebels, they also worked with the Islamic State, especially in Deir ez-Zor's hinterland.

- Al-Nusra Front
- Liwa al-Fatihoun min Ard ash-Sham
- Ahrar al-Sham

=== SDF forces and allies ===
Autonomous Administration of North and East Syria (since 2016)

- Syrian Democratic Forces
  - People's Protection Units (YPG)
    - Anti-Terror Units
    - YPG International
  - Women's Protection Units (YPJ)
  - Deir ez-Zor Military Council
    - Gathering of al-Baggara Youth
    - Khabat al-Sha'iti Battalion
    - Hajin battalion
  - Al-Sanadid Forces
  - Manbij Military Council
    - Manbij Revolutionaries Battalion
    - Martyr Abdo Dushka Regiment
  - Army of Revolutionaries
    - Kurdish Front
  - (Syrian opposition) Northern Democratic Brigade
  - Syriac Military Council (MFS)
    - Special Forces unit
  - Nattoreh
- Federal security forces
  - Self Defence Forces (HXP)
  - Asayish

International Freedom Battalion (IFB)

- Communist Party of Turkey/Marxist–Leninist (TKP/ML)
  - Liberation Army of the Workers and Peasants of Turkey (TİKKO)

Foreign support:

- CJTF–OIR
  - United States
    - United States Armed Forces
      - United States Army
        - Delta Force
      - United States Air Force
      - United States special operations forces
      - United States Marine Corps
  - United Kingdom
    - British Armed Forces
      - Royal Air Force
      - British Army
        - Special Air Service (unconfirmed by authorities)
  - France
    - French Air Force
    - French Army
      - 68e régiment d'artillerie d'Afrique
    - French SOF
  - Netherlands
    - Royal Netherlands Air and Space Force
  - Denmark (2016)
    - Royal Danish Air Force
  - Australia (2016)
    - Royal Australian Air Force
- Iraq (minor cross border support since 2018, against ISIS only)
  - Popular Mobilization Forces
- Russia (air support since 2018, against ISIS only)
  - Russian Air Force

=== Pro-ISIS forces ===
Islamic State (IS)

- Military of ISIS
  - Wilayat al-Khayr (until 2018)
  - Wilayat al-Sham (since 2018)
    - al-Barakah district (2016–2019)
    - al-Khayr district (2018–19)
    - al-Furat district (2018–19)
