= Deir ez-Zor offensive (September–November 2017) =

Military operation launched by the Syrian Armed Forces

- Part of the Battle of Deir ez-Zor and the Eastern Syria campaign of the Syrian civil war
- The situation in Deir ez-Zor, as of 17 November 2017 Syrian Government control Syrian Democratic Forces control
Date	14 September – 17 November 2017 (2 months and 3 days)
Location	Deir ez-Zor, Deir ez-Zor Governorate, Syria
Result	Syrian government victory
Territorial changes	On 17 October, the Syrian Army secured a perimeter surrounding the ISIL-controlled half of the city; On 3 November, the Syrian Army took complete control of the city, and on 17 November, ISIL surrendered the island of Hawijat Kati, bringing all areas around the city under Army control

Belligerents
(Syria) Syrian Government; Russia; Iran; Allied militias: Liwa Fatemiyoun; Fatah al-Intifada; Galilee Forces; Free Palestine Movement	Islamic State of Iraq and the Levant (surrendered)

Commanders and leaders
(Syria) Maj. Gen. Suheil al-Hassan (Syria) Maj. Gen. Issam Zahreddine † (Republican Guard) (Russia) (Syria) Lt. Gen. Valery Asapov † (Syrian 5th Corps) (Syria) Brig. Gen. Ghassan Iskandar Tarraf (Republican Guard) (Syria) Tha'er Ismail † (Tiger Forces); Maj. Gen. Abu Ali Salhab (Military Security Shield Forces); Tariq al-Hassan † (Baqir Brigade) (Iran) Shaaban Ali Amiri † (IRGC senior commander)	(Islamic State) Unknown

Units involved
Syrian Armed Forces; Syrian Arab Army; Republican Guard; 104th Airborne Brigade; 17th Reserve Division; 137th Mechanized Brigade; Tiger Forces; Syrian Arab Air Force; National Defense Forces; Military Intelligence Directorate; Military Security Shield Forces; Local Defence Forces; Baqir Brigade; Lions of Hussein; Russian Armed Forces; Russian Air Force; Russian Navy; Special Operations Forces; Wagner Group; IRGC	(Islamic State) Military of ISIL; Wilayat Deir ez-Zor

Casualties and losses
120 killed (18 Sep. – 25 Sep.; 29 Oct. – 1 Nov.)	300+ killed (Syrian claim; 29 Sep. – 13 Oct.); 101 killed (per SOHR; 29 Oct. – 1 Nov.); 250+ captured

The Deir ez-Zor offensive was a military operation launched by the Syrian Armed Forces to completely expel the Islamic State of Iraq and the Levant (ISIL) from the city of Deir ez-Zor, a provincial capital, located on the banks of the Euphrates river. From 2014 until 2017, the city had been divided into Syrian government and ISIL-controlled halves. The rest of the Governorate (province) was under ISIL control for most of this time, putting the government-controlled half of the city under siege.

In the summer of 2017, the Syrian Army launched a large-scale offensive in central Syria, where they succeeded in lifting the siege and began offensive operations to capture the rest of the city, as well as the surrounding areas.

== Background ==
The Syrian Army managed to break the siege of Deir ez-Zor by linking up with the 137th brigade base on 5 September. The next day they secured a supply line via the Ar-Raqqa road, at which point the siege was officially lifted and two new objectives were established: first, to capture the nearby villages on the Eastern bank of the Euphrates, surrounding the ISIL-controlled parts of the city and cutting access to the city for the Syrian Democratic Forces who were conducting a concurrent offensive in the area. Second, to recapture the entire city.

== Battle ==
=== Surrounding the city ===
On 14 September, the Syrian Army captured the district of Al-Baghiliyah as well as the Al-Jazeera University campus, located within the district. After this, the Syrian Army was able to capture Maria'yah and secured its surroundings.

On 15 September, Russian Foreign Ministry spokeswoman Maria Zakharova announced the beginning of the army offensive across the Euphrates River, codenamed Assad's jump, and a day later, the Russian air force bombed the positions of the SDF northeast of Deir ez-Zor.

On 16 September, the Syrian Army captured Ayyash and its nearby hill, reversing ISIL gains made during a previous offensive in 2016.

On 18 September, pro-government forces crossed the Euphrates River using pontoon bridges, and launched an offensive on the east bank of the city of Deir ez-Zor, capturing positions east of al-Marat and reaching the outskirts of Mazloum. On 22 September, the 4th Mechanized Division and the 5th Legion began an advance south of Mazloum towards Khasham.

On 23 September, government forces advanced northwest of Deir ez-Zor, linking up with troops in southeast Raqqa and capturing Maadan. Between 14 and 23 September, the military had cleared between 1,300 and 1,700 square kilometers of territory, including 35 towns and villages.

On 6 October, it was reported that Syrian airstrikes on ISIS-held Al-Makhan in eastern Deir ez-Zor resulted in 13 civilian deaths.

On 16 October, the Syrian Army captured the town of al-Husayniyah on the other side of Euphrates from Deir ez-Zor. The next day, the town of Janenah was also captured.

On 17 October, the Syrian Army engaged ISIS on the east bank of the Euphrates and captured Al-Khasarat, Al-Kanamat, and Al-Matar, giving them control of all areas surrounding the ISIL-held parts of the city. The following day, Syrian Democratic Forces captured the villages of Shaqra, Hissan, Safirah Fawqani and Al-Jea'a. These advances eliminated all of ISIL's presence along the Euphrates north of Khasham, with the exception of Deir Ez-Zor city itself.

=== Capturing the city ===
On 17 October, the Army captured three districts in Deir ez-Zor and advanced in three other areas, bringing 90 percent of the city under their control.

On 18 October, while operations were being conducted against ISIL forces on Saqr Island, Major General Issam Zahreddine was killed after his convoy hit a landmine. The following day, ISIL launched a surprise offensive on Saqr Island. They detonated a tunnel bomb before a general attack on Syrian Army positions, aiming to push them off the island. However, the attack was repelled with minimal army casualties.

On 23 October, it was reported that Syrian airstrikes on the residential neighbourhood of Qosour in western Deir ez-Zor resulted in 15 civilian deaths.

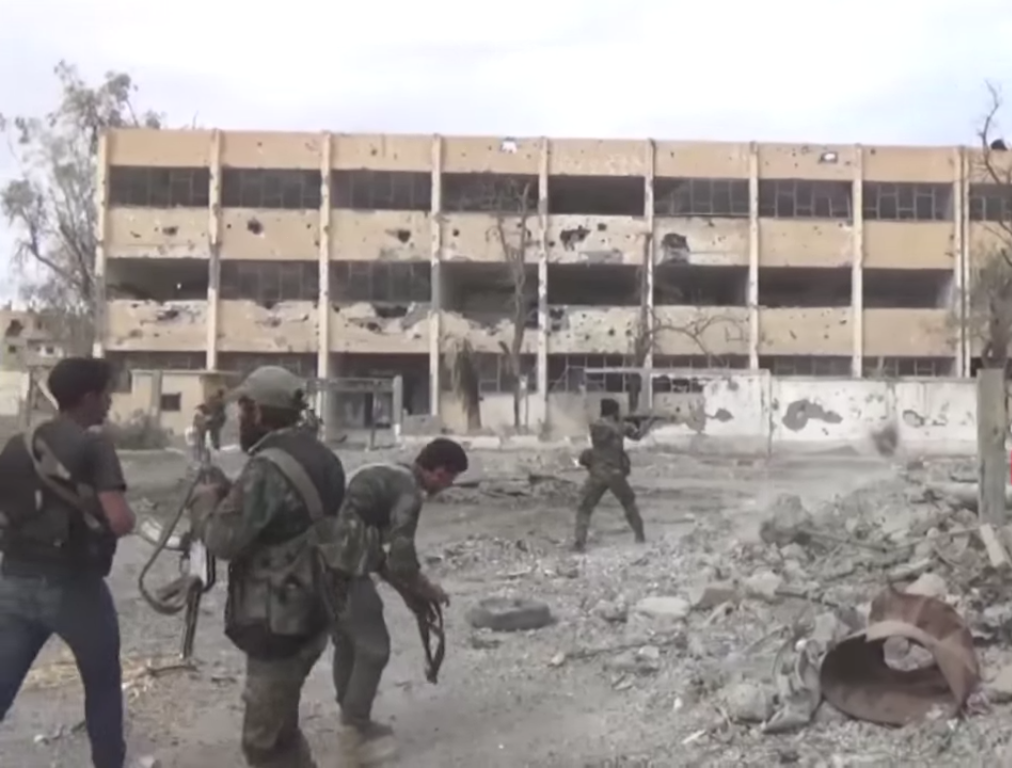
Syrian soldiers fighting in the streets of Deir Ez-Zor on 2 November

On 25 October, the Syrian Army broke through ISIL defenses in the northwest section of the Al-Harabisheh district, advancing 100 meters past the city stadium. The next day, after capturing the city's Industrial District, Syrian Army forces led by the elite Tiger Forces crossed the Euphrates and attacked Saqr island from its western flank. By the end of the day, government forces managed to capture the island. They also captured parts of the al-Sena’aa District and entered the Ummal District.

On 29 October, government forces captured two districts and a stadium in Deir ez-Zor, after which they advanced into a third district. They were attempting to reach an area that overlooks some of the remaining ISIL-held neighborhoods where an estimated 1,500 civilians were trapped. 50 ISIL militants and 23 pro-government fighters were killed during the day's fighting. On 31 October, Syrian Government forces had recaptured the districts of al-Kannamat and al-Rasafeh, as well as completely securing the Old Airport area, after taking the municipal stadium on the previous day.

On 1 November, the Syrian Army made significant advances in central Deir ez-Zor, capturing Jubaliyah district, the school of law, the central park and the southern part of the Hamidiyah district. On the next day, ISIL's defense lines collapsed as the Tiger forces and Republican guard units made rapid advances in the central parts of the city, capturing Deir ez-Zor's largest district, Hamidiyah. This left ISIL forces squeezed in the four remaining neighborhoods under their control along the western bank of the Euphrates. By midnight, the Sheikh Yassin, Ardhi and Rashdiyah neighborhoods were captured, leaving only the al-Hawiqa district under jihadist control, with around 100 militants confined there. On 3 November, Syrian government forces completely captured the city.

On 10 November, the Syrian Army controlled 80 percent of Hawijat Qati island after an offensive to capture ISIL's last positions in the area. By 17 November, the last ISIL fighters on the island had surrendered, and the Syrian Army regained control of all territory surrounding Deir ez Zor city.

Progress of the offensive in the surrounding areas of Deir ez-Zor

== Aftermath – advance on Abu Kamal ==
The victory in Deir ez-Zor city freed Syrian army units to engage ISIL forces in the towns south of Mayadin and join in the efforts to reach the strategic border town of Abu Kamal, from the northern axis.

== See also ==
- Battle of Mosul (2016–2017)
- Syrian Desert campaign (May–July 2017)
- 2017 Mayadin offensive
- 2017 Euphrates Crossing offensive
- Southern Raqqa offensive (June 2017)
- 2017 Abu Kamal offensive
