= Mohammad Khaddour =

Syrian former military officer

- Native name: محمد خضور
- Born: January 13, 1976 (age 50); Latakia, Syria
- Allegiance: Ba'athist Syria
- Branch: Syrian Arab Army
- Rank: Major General
- Conflicts: Syrian civil war; Deir ez-Zor Governorate campaign; Siege of Deir ez-Zor (2014–2017); Battle of Al-Sukhnah

Mohammad Ibrahim Khaddour (Arabic: محمد ابراهيم خضور) is an Alawite and former Ba'athist major general known for his role commanding the Republican Guard’s 106th Brigade, and the Syrian Arab Army's 17th Reserve Division, the 3rd Corps, and for his leadership in the Deir ez-Zor offensive.

== Early life ==
Khaddour was born on January 13, 1976, in Latakia. By the outbreak of the Syrian Revolution Khaddour was a rising officer in the Republican Guard.

== Syrian civil war ==
At the outbreak of the Syrian Civil War he was a brigadier general and commanded the 106th Brigade of the Republican Guard and was deployed to quell demonstrations in Damascus suburbs. Human Rights Watch described Khaddour as "directly responsible" for violent repression in Douma, ordering troops to beat and shoot protesters, calling any anti-government protester a terrorist. Khaddour would be sanctioned by the European Union in 2012 and the United Kingdom identified him as an individual involved in "violent repression of the civilian population."

=== Aleppo front ===
On November 29, 2012, he was appointed head of the Military and Security Committee in Aleppo, overseeing all regime military operations in the province. After failing to rapidly crush resistance in the city, and with rising losses in the Syrian Arab Army Khaddour was abruptly replaced in July 2013 by Issam Zahreddine, another Republican Guard officer notorious for brutality.

=== Deir ez-Zor ===
Khaddour would be reassigned to the eastern front, to break the Siege of Deir ez-Zor and emerging as the major general of the 17th Reserve Division. Reports indicate Khaddour was in the city during critical periods of the siege until mid-2016, but otherwise commanded forces from outside the city. Khaddour controversially implemented a Popular Mobilization effort conscripting civil servants and students into militias which subsequently saw low morale and near constant desertions. As the battle worsened this conscription was expanded to any man 18–40, with army personnel seen forcefully conscripting those that resist. Khaddour played a vital role in the Deir ez-Zor offensive which finally lifted the city's siege.

Afterwards he would continue to participate in anti-Islamic State mop-up operations, notably in the Battle of Al-Sukhnah, serving as a field commander coordinating closely with militias and Russian air support. Khaddour was the patron of Suqur al-Furat, a militia affiliated to the politically active Marxist-Leninist Syrian Resistance.

=== Later war ===
In 2017 Khaddour was named the commander of the 3rd Corps and was on the military high command. Khaddour was reportedly named to a post in the Military Security branch in Homs in 2020. Khaddour is one of the major Ba'athist officer fugitives that the current government of Syria is hunting for after the fall of the Assad regime due to dozens of massacres his forces had perpetuated. On 18 June 2025, one of Khaddour close compatriots, intelligence brigadier general Daas Hassan Ali was arrested.
