= Deir ez-Zor offensive (December 2014) =

Military operation

Coordinates: 35.3333°N 40.1500°E

- Part of the Siege of Deir ez-Zor (2014–2017)
Date	3–13 December 2014 (1 week and 3 days)
Location	Deir ez-Zor, Deir ez-Zor Governorate, Syria
Result	Partial ISIL victory: ISIL captures al-Mari'iyah, al-Jafra, the Missiles Battalion base and the mountain overlooking Deir ez-Zor city; Syrian government forces recaptures the mountain, the base, and most of al-Mari'iyah and al-Jafra

Belligerents
Islamic State	(Syria) Syrian Government; Al-Shaitat tribes

Commanders and leaders
Amer Al-Rafdan (ISIL top commander); Abu al Faruq † (Tunisian ISIL Deir ez-Zor commander); Van Manco (Filipino ISIL commander)	Brig. Gen. Issam Zahreddine (Republican Guard commander); Mudar Makhlouf (Military Intelligence militia commander); Rafaa Aakla al-Raju

Units involved
Military of ISIL	Syrian Armed Forces; Syrian Army; 17th Mechanized Division; 137th Mechanized Brigade; Republican Guard; 104th Airborne Brigade; National Defence Forces; Military Intelligence militia contingents

Strength
3,000+ militants (by September)	150 soldiers (reinforcements); 200 tribal fighters

Casualties and losses
250+ militants killed (by 6 December)	43–51 soldiers killed (by 6 December)

The Deir ez-Zor offensive (December 2014) was a military operation launched by the Islamic State (IS) on the Deir ez-Zor Airport and the surrounding areas.

== Battle ==
On 3 December, ISIL launched an offensive in the direction of the Deir Ezzor military airbase. They reportedly managed to capture the al-Masemekeh Building after a suicide bomber detonated a car near it, killing 19 soldiers and NDF fighters, according to the SOHR. In the clashes that followed, 7 ISIL militants were killed, while ISIL seized two tanks, an APC, an artillery piece, and machine guns. The next day, ISIL reportedly advanced further and captured al-Mari'iyah village, and they also captured parts of the al-Jafra village, while the Syrian Army reported that the 104th Airborne Brigade of the Republican Guard Killed over 20 ISIL militants, and seized 3 tanks. The same source named 17 ISIL casualties in from fighting in the al-Mari’ayyi area. The SAF conducted ten airstrikes on ISIL positions that day.

On 5 December, ISIL captured al-Jafra village. 37 ISIL militants and 30 soldiers were killed during the takeover. Meanwhile, 15 ISIL fighters were killed by coalition warplanes targeting a convoy in the al-Bokamal countryside. Later that day, the Syrian Army launched a counterattack and recaptured parts of al-Mari'iyah village, and regained control of the perimeter of the Deir-ez Zour airbase from ISIL The Syrian Army claimed that it had killed over 100 ISIL militants since the start of the ISIL offensive, while SOHR gave the number of 45. ISIL also managed to capture some positions and military equipment on the mountain overlooking the city.

During the early morning of 6 December, ISIL took control of the missiles battalion to northeast of the airport. At the same time, ISIL detonated a car-bomb at the main gate of the air base and managed to advance into the base, but this attack was eventually repelled due to heavy shelling and bombardment by the Army. ISIS also pulled back from the mountain overlooking Deir ez Zor after it was exposed to heavy aerial bombardment by the SAF, which reportedly used chlorine gas. Since the start of the offensive, 51 soldiers and 68 ISIS militants were killed, according to SOHR. Al-Masdar reported that over 200 ISIS fighters have been killed along with 43 Army soldiers since the start of the offensive.

On 7 December, the military stated that ISIS forces had retreated south of the military airport. Later that day, they also reported that there was no more fighting in the vicinity of the airport. ISIS launched a new attack in an attempt to breach the eastern perimeter of the base. A Saudi suicide car-bomber attempted to crash into the eastern gates and clear the way for ISIS fighters. However, the vehicle was destroyed by government soldiers before he reached his target. The fighting of the evening left 23 ISIS fighters dead, according to a military source. A number of soldiers were captured during the attack, according to the SOHR.

On 8 December, a military source reported that ISIS begun to withdraw their forces from al-Jafra. Fighting also continued in al-Mari'iyah. Meanwhile, on the nearby Sakr Island (Hajeewa Sakr), the military reported killing over 70 ISIS militants during the previous three days.

On 9 December, ISIS retreated after their attack on Deir ez-Zor military airport failed, withdrawing to the outskirts of surrounding villages. The Syrian Army launched intensive airstrikes on their strongholds on the outskirts of the villages of al-Jafra, al-Hawija and Marihiyak in order to further secure the airport area and prevent fighters from having a second opportunity at getting close to its walls.

On 11 December, government forces regained control of al-Jafra and the points on the mountain. However, later ISIS advanced around al-Jafra and the outskirts of the Hajeewa Sakr area and took control over areas opposite of al-Jafra, linking ISIS-held territory between the two areas.

At midnight on 12 December, a suicide bomber driving a tank blew himself up at the eastern wall of the air base, damaging Army fortifications. The tank's approach was not noticed due to the dense morning fog. After that, a car-bomber attempted to reach the airport's gate but his vehicle was destroyed 40 meters from his target. The double bombing attack was followed by a ground attack which was repelled.

Later, Syrian troops ambushed a group of ISIS fighters in the al-Jbeila. Also, troops recaptured al-Hwaika after ISIS advanced into it the previous day, while according to a military source the Army had secured 70 percent of al-Mari'iyah, with ISIS still holding positions in the south-eastern perimeter of the town.

On 13 December, Syrian troops pushed back another ISIS attack on the military airport. The next day, 200 members of the Shaatat tribe joined to Army at the military air base to fight against ISIS. Meanwhile, fighting continued near the al-Jafra school in an attempt by ISIS to breach the Army defense line.

== Aftermath ==
On 15 December, the Republican Guard, supported by the Syrian Air Force, reportedly captured several blocks in the vicinity of Deir es-Zor.

On 17 December, the Army’s 104th Airborne Brigade, backed up by the NDF and a local tribe, launched a major counter-offensive northeast of the airport, reportedly taking complete control of 1.5 km of land adjacent to the base. Also, the 137th Brigade of the Army’s 17th Division captured the area of the Al-Rashidiyyeh Bank. Three days later, a new assault on the air base resulted in the deaths of 20 ISIS militants and eight soldiers, one of whom was a Brigadier General, the commander of the Deir ez-Zor air base. During the fighting ISIS captured a white building on the southeastern edge of the base. Three days later, ISIS captured several other positions near the base and the mountain.

In fighting in the Al-Sina'a city district between 25 and 27 December, at least 30 ISIS militants were killed, according to a military source. Meanwhile, ISIS still controlled about 30% of Sakr Island and was being supplied only by boats.

On 27 January, the Army captured the Rocket Battalion's base and the Al-Waaqa’at Farms, north of the air base. They also reportedly recaptured the Observatory Facility in the Abu Bardan area of Sakr Island. This brought 75% of the island under Army control, according to a military source. The fighting left 20 ISIS fighters dead. The next day, the military further advanced and fully secured the village of al-Mari'iyah. In early February, ISIS forces further retreated from several positions east of the air base.

Mid-March, the Army captured the salt farm to the south of Deir ez-Zor and advanced to the town of Al-Shulah, with more than 35 ISIS fighters being killed. Also, at the end of the month, the Army captured the area of the Electrical Facility, near the Al-Taym Oil Fields, and, backed up by a local tribe, the village of Al-Malha, east of the city.

== See also ==
- Deir ez-Zor clashes
  - Deir ez-Zor clashes (2011–14)
  - Deir ez-Zor offensive (January 2016)
- List of wars and battles involving ISIL
