= Lions of Hussein =

Syrian loyalist militia

- Arabic: لواء أسود الحسين
- The logo of the militia. On the bottom the slogan "Homeland, Honour, Sincerity" is written.
- Leaders: Muhammad Tawfiq al-Assad †; Hussein Tawfiq al-Assad
- Dates active: 1980s – 2015 (as Shabiha and criminal organization); 2015 – ? (as official militia)
- Allegiance: Ba'athist Syria
- Headquarters: Qardaha
- Active regions: Syria
- Ideology: Assadism; Anti-Wahhabism
- Size: c. 1,000 (2014)
- Part of: Syrian Army's 4th Corps (denied by the militia); (Syria) Local Defence Forces (since 2018)
- Wars: the Syrian Civil War

The Guardians of Syria Forces - Lions of Hussein (Arabic: قوات حماة سوريا - أسود الحسين, Quwat Humat Souriya - Usud al-Hussein), formerly known as Lions of Hussein Brigade (Arabic: لواء أسود الحسين, Liwa Usud al-Hussein) and often shortened to Lions of Hussein, was an Alawite militia which fought for the Ba'athist government during the Syrian Civil War.

The unit originated from Shabiha, a criminal organization that operated in Latakia Governorate since the 1980s, and only adopted its name and appearance in 2015. Since then, the Lions of Hussein reportedly continued their "criminal activities on the side".

== History ==
=== Muhammad al-Assad's Shabiha ===
The Lions of Hussein began as the personal gang of Muhammad Tawfiq al-Assad, a native of Qardaha and member of the wider Al-Assad family. In the 1980s, the group ran smuggling networks throughout Latakia, dealt in contraband as well as drugs, and was reportedly involved in kidnappings, extortion and theft. Between 1989 and 1994, they operated as government-sanctioned Shabiha, with Mohammed amassing millions of Syrian pounds and becoming notorious and feared as smuggler and “highway robber (قطع الطريق; qata’ al-tariq)”. According to a Syrian opposition source, the activities of the group became so excessive that Bassel al-Assad had Muhammad and some of his aides thrown into prison, though they were eventually released on the orders of Bashar al-Assad.

As the Syrian economy opened up, Muhammad adopted a more legal persona, entered business and bought a PhD for himself, though kept his criminal network and fief around Qardaha. After the outbreak of the civil war in 2011, Muhammad led the recruitment of new members for Shabiha militias in Latakia. According to an opposition source, Muhammad and his men committed various unspecified atrocities in course of the conflict, causing frictions among the powerful Alawite families of Latakia. Many clans feared possible rebel reprisals due to the actions of the Shabiha, and in October 2012 this reportedly caused an armed dispute between Muhammad and a member of the Khayyir family. Initially affiliated with the al-Bustan Association, Muhammad's private militia started to closely cooperate with the Iranian Islamic Revolutionary Guard Corps in 2014. Counting about 1,000 fighters at the time, the group mostly fought in northern and eastern Latakia, and was responsible for the protection of Qardaha.

Muhammad was eventually killed on 12 March 2015, when he was either ambushed and shot by a rival or killed during another dispute. After his death, his followers reportedly brought his body to the frontline at Doreen in northern Latakia and went on to claim that he had died fighting rebels. A Free Syrian Army senior commander however denied that rebel forces had killed Muhammad. According to a Syrian Army soldier Muhammad had been killed just after the government had asked him to form a paramilitary unit.

=== Reorganization under Hussein's leadership ===
After Muhammad's death, his son, Hussein Tawfiq al-Assad, took control of the criminal network and its armed contingent. He went on to rebrand and reorganize it as official paramilitary unit, and around late June/early July 2015 officially "founded" the "Lions of Hussein Brigade". According to regional expert Aymenn Jawad Al-Tamimi, the new name of the group could be understood as referring both to Hussein Tawfiq al-Assad himself as well as Imam Husayn ibn Ali. The reorganization aimed at reducing the group's previous negative image that had resulted from its association with Muhammad's criminal activities. According to 2017 reports by the Austrian Armed Forces' Truppendienst magazine and a Clingendael Institute researcher the militia became part of the Russian-backed and Republican Guard-led 4th Corps. A commander of the Lions of Hussein later denied any affiliation with the 4th Corps or Russia. The Lions of Hussein consequently fought for the government in various war zones, participating in the Palmyra offensive (July–August 2015) against the Islamic State of Iraq and the Levant (ISIL), the Al-Ghab offensive (July–August 2015), the offensive to recapture Marj al-Sultan airbase in late 2015, and the 2015–16 Latakia offensive. Meanwhile, the unit reportedly continues its "criminal activities on the side".

Around February 2016, the unit underwent another reformation and reconstitution, adopting a new name: "Guardians of Syria Forces - Lions of Hussein". This was due to the group absorbing 200 fighters who had links to the Russian forces in Syria. At the time, the militia was stationed near Kinsabba, and enjoyed the public support of various Alawite sheikhs. By March, the Lions were active in eastern Aleppo. The Lions of Hussein also launched a recruitment campaign in June 2016, promising recruits LS 50,000 (US$230) for fighting in the Latakia region, and LS 80,000 (US$360) for fighting in Palmyra. Furthermore, the group continued to strengthen its ties to the Revolutionary Guard, developing an "official affiliation" with it during 2016. It also joined the Latakia branch of the Iranian-backed Local Defence Forces.

Alongside other units of the Local Defence Forces, the Lions of Hussein helped to break the Siege of Deir ez-Zor, closely cooperating with the Tiger Forces during the battle for the city in late 2017. Following the Eastern Syria campaign (September–December 2017)'s conclusion, the group was among the units left to secure Mayadin and Abu Kamal Districts against remnants of ISIL.

== Equipment ==
The Lions of Hussein are considered to be "well armed"; their primary weapons appear to be AKMs and AK-74s, while they employ technicals as improvised fighting vehicles. The group also possesses heavy weapons, such as RPG-7s, 9K111 Fagot or 9M113 Konkurs rocket launchers and at least one tank.

== See also ==
- List of armed groups in the Syrian Civil War
- Shabiha
