= Euphrates Crossing offensive (2017) =

Military offensive

2017 Euphrates Crossing offensive
- Part of the Eastern Syria campaign and the Russian military intervention in the Syrian civil war
Date	18 September – 21 October 2017 (1 month and 3 days)
Location	Eastern Syria: Eastern Deir ez-Zor Governorate
Status	Syrian Army victory: The Syrian Army captured ten villages after crossing the Euphrates River; The Syrian Army encircles the ISIL-held part of Deir ez-Zor city

Belligerents
(Syria) Syrian Arab Republic; Russia	Islamic State of Iraq and the Levant

Commanders and leaders
(Syria) Maj. Gen. Suheil al-Hassan (Operations chief commander) (Syria) Maj. Gen. Issam Zahreddine † (104th Airborne Brigade of Republican Guard) (Russia) Lt. Gen. Valery Asapov † (Syrian 5th Corps commander)	(Islamic State) Unknown

Units involved
Syrian Armed Forces; Syrian Army; Republican Guard; 5th Corps; ISIS Hunters; 17th Division; 13th Brigade; 137th Brigade; Russian forces; Russian Aerospace Forces; Special operations forces; Wagner Group	(Islamic State) Military of ISIL; Wilayat Deir ez-Zor

Casualties and losses
(Syria) 72 killed (SOHR claim) (Russia) 7 killed (SOHR claim) (some possibly PMCs)	300+ killed (SAA claim; 29 Sep. – 13 Oct.)

The 2017 Euphrates Crossing offensive was a military offensive launched by the Syrian Arab Army against members of the Islamic State of Iraq and the Levant (ISIL) in the Deir ez-Zor Governorate, following the breaking of the three-year siege of the city of Deir ez-Zor. The Euphrates Crossing offensive, conducted by government troops, was done with the aim of denying US-backed Syrian Democratic Forces and the US itself leverage over the Syrian government.

The offensive was concurrent with the two SDF offensives, the Battle of Raqqa and the northern Deir ez-Zor offensive, as well the Hawija Offensive in Iraq.

== Background ==
=== 2011–14 ===
Protests against the Syrian government and violence in the Syrian city Deir ez-Zor took place since March 2011, but large-scale fighting began in late November 2011, in order for the rebels to take control of the eastern part of Syria. By the end of 2013, rebels took over most of the province, leaving only a small pocket of government control in and around the city of Deir ez-Zor.

=== 2014–17 ===
Following the expansion of the Islamic State of Iraq and Levant in late 2013 and early 2014, ISIL forces launched a major offensive against the rebels in the province and the city of Deir Ez-Zor, pushing out rebel forces and besieging government troops in Deir ez-Zory city. For more than three years, the Syrian Arab Army managed to keep control of the western half of the city, while ISIL was in control of the entire eastern side of the city. During this time ISIL launched several offensives to capture the remaining parts of the city with limited gains.

=== Summer 2017 ===
On 27 August, as part of a wider campaign in central Syria against ISIL, the Syrian Arab Army, launched a major offensive against the city of Deir ez-Zor in an attempt to break the siege. On 3 September, pro-government forces broke through to the city's first lines of defense around 10 pm. Two days later, the siege was broken. Soon after, the Syrian Democratic Forces (SDF) launched an offensive on ISIL positions east of the Euphrates River on 8 September, with US and Kurd officials announcing they would not allow the Syrian Arab Army to descend across the Euphrates. Meanwhile, on 10 September, the Syrian Arab Army broke the siege of the Deir ez-Zor military airport, after which they pushed to the south. Concurrently the SDF broke through to the outskirts of the city on the other side of the Euphrates and occupied the industrial zone and the main road. On 11 September, the Syrian Arab Army and the pro-government media announced the beginning of an offensive and amphibious landing over the Euphrates River, beginning with the installation of pontoon bridges and amphibians. The announcement in the pro-government media was that the military operation would be called the Assad's jump on the occasion of the birthday of Syrian President Bashar al-Assad. On 15 September, Russian Foreign Ministry spokeswoman Maria Zakharova announced the beginning of an army offensive across the Euphrates River, and a day later the Russian air force bombed the positions of the SDF northeast of Deir ez-Zor. Elsewhere, pro-government forces, with the support of Russian air strikes, launched operations against Deir ez-Zor city's northwestern district. The same day, the Syrian government announced the start of an offensive on Al-Bukamal and the complete closure of the border with Iraq.

== The offensive ==
On 18 September, pro-government forces crossed the Euphrates River using makeshift bridges, and launched an offensive on the east bank of the city of Deir ez-Zor, advancing within 3 miles (5 km) of positions held by the SDF. The next day, the SAA said that pro-government forces continued to advance on the east bank of the Euphrates, including an assault against al-Sabah village.

On 20 September, the Russian Defense Ministry accused the US-backed SDF of assisting ISIL in East Deir Ez-Zor in various ways in an attempt to prevent the Syrian army and its paramilitaries from capturing the region. Russian General Igor Konashenkov, spokesman for the Ministry, noted that the strongest ISIL counter-attacks and artillery shelling on the Syrian Army bridge on the eastern bank of the Euphrates River came from the north where the US and Kurdish forces hold positions, not from the south where most ISIL forces were. The Russian general accused the US Coalition of other acts of sabotage against the forces of the Syrian army. US denied complicity with ISIS.

On 21 September, ISIL released video appearing to show it was deploying armed drones to prevent the SAA from expanding its positions on the east coast of Deir ez-Zor. ISIS opened fire on the Syrian army, but the army did not report any losses. Meanwhile, the Syrian Arab Army (SAA) continued its march along the east coast of the Euphrates River, capturing a new town located near the strategic Al-'Omar's oil fields after fierce clashes with ISIS members. With the support of heavy artillery from the 113th and 137th Brigades of the 17th Division, the 5th Legion of the Syrian Arab Army reported it had overcome the positions of the ISIS east of the recently captured al-Marat in order to advance to Mazloum. The 4th Mechanized Division and the 5th Legion began an advance south of Mazloum towards Khasham.

On 5 October, units of the 4th Armoured Division crossed the Euphrates. On 16 October, Syrian army captured town of al-Husayniyah on the other side of Euphrates from Deir ez-Zor after full day of clashes with ISIL fighters. The next day, the town of Janenah was also captured.

On 18 October, Major General Issam Zahreddine, the commander of 104th Airborne Brigade of the Republican Guard who lead the Syrian Army during the three-year siege of Deir ez-Zor, was killed by a land mine in Saqr Island within Euphrates river.

Syrian Army captured southern parts of Deir ez-Zor industrial area, including paper factory and construction zone, north of village of Al-Salhiyah in the morning of 20 October. The next morning, two settlements were captured by the Syrian Army.

== Aftermath ==
The Syrian Army began operations to recapture the city of Deir ez-Zor on 17 October and by 3 November, government forces completely captured the city.
