= Deir ez-Zor Governorate clashes =

Battle between the Syrian Army and the Syrian Democratic Forces

Deir ez-Zor Governorate clashes (April 2018)
- Part of the Deir ez-Zor Governorate campaign of the Syrian civil war
Date	29 April 2018
Location	Eastern bank of the Euphrates, Deir ez-Zor Governorate, Syria
Status	Inconclusive, minor Syrian government gains: Syrian pro-government forces capture four villages; USA helps the SDF recaptures all four villages (per SDF) or at least three (per SOHR)

Belligerents
(Syria) Syrian Arab Republic	Syrian Democratic Forces; CJTF–OIR

Casualties and losses
9 killed	6 killed, 22 wounded

On 29 April 2018, clashes took place between Syrian government forces and the Syrian Democratic Forces (SDF) in Deir ez-Zor Governorate.

== Background ==
Tensions between the Syrian Army and the Syrian Democratic Forces in the eastern bank of the Euphrates of Deir ez-Zor Governorate have always been high following the liberation of Deir ez-Zor city from ISIL and the SDF's capture of large parts of the area following its offensive against ISIL with CJTF–OIR support. On 16 September 2017, either Syrian or Russian aircraft bombed SDF positions on the eastern bank. On 25 September, Russian and Syrian forces shelled SDF forces in the nearby Conoco gas field. Between 7 February and 8 February 2018, clashes between the SDF and pro-Syrian government forces near Khasham resulted in US airstrikes on pro-government forces which killed dozens of pro-government militiamen, including contractors of the Russian private military company Wagner Group. Additional armed incidents took place in the following weeks.

Tensions between the two backers of the Syrian government and Syrian Democratic Forces, Russia and the United States respectively, had also risen before the clashes due to the alleged Douma chemical attack and the subsequent missile strikes against the Syrian government by the US, France and the United Kingdom.

A few days before the clashes, there were claims that the SDF were going to restart anti-ISIL operations in co-ordination with the US-led coalition near the Iraq–Syria border in Deir ez-Zor Governorate. The previous offensive against ISIL in the region was postponed due to the Turkish offensive against SDF forces in Afrin.

== Clashes ==
On 29 April, the Syrian Army attacked and captured four SDF-held villages on the eastern side of the Euphrates river in Deir ez-Zor Governorate. According to the Syrian Observatory for Human Rights (SOHR), nine pro-government and six SDF-affiliated fighters were killed in the clashes. SDF spokesperson Kino Gabriel claimed that the clashes were "supporting terrorism and an attempt to obstruct the war against terrorism". Several hours later, the SDF claimed they recaptured all of the villages they lost, although the SOHR reported three of the four villages had been recaptured by the SDF. Some local sources claimed that US-led coalition jets hit pro-government forces attacking the SDF, although the Pentagon stated they only conducted warning airstrikes and did not hit the pro-government troops directly.

== See also ==
- Battle of Qamishli (2016)
- Battle of al-Hasakah (2016)
- Battle of Khasham
- September 2016 Deir ez-Zor air raid
