= Deir ez-Zor offensive (2016) =

ISIL military operation

- Part of the Battle of Deir ez-Zor and the Russian military intervention in the Syrian civil war
- The situation in Deir ez-Zor as of 19 January 2016 Syrian Arab Army control Islamic State of Iraq and the Levant control
Date	16–21 January 2016 (5 days)
Location	Deir ez-Zor, Deir ez-Zor Governorate, Syria 35.3333°N 40.1500°E
Result	ISIL victory
Territorial changes	ISIL captures the northern suburbs of Deir Ez-zor city including Al-Bughayliyah, Ayyash and the Al Mari'iyah Farms

Belligerents
Islamic State	(Syria) Syrian Arab Republic: Syrian Army; Syrian Air Force; National Defence Forces; Shaitat tribe; (Russia) Russian Armed Forces: Russian Air Force

Commanders and leaders
Abu Bakr al-Baghdadi; Abu Ruqayya al-Ansari; Abu Hamza Al-Ansari † (ISIL Deir ez-Zor emir); Abu Hadhefah Al-Maghrabi † (ISIL field commander)	(Syria) Lt. General Ali Abdullah Ayyoub (Syria) Maj. Gen. Issam Zahreddine (Republican Guard commander) (Syria) Brig. Gen. Yassin Mahmoud Hamoud † (Syria) Yarob Zahreddine (Commander in 104th Airborne Brigade) (Syria) Brig. Gen. Yasar Ali †

Units involved
Military of ISIL	Republican Guard: 104th Airborne Brigade; 17th Division: 137th Mechanized Brigade

Strength
Up to 2,000	4,000

Casualties and losses
110+ killed	200 killed (48 executed)
- 127–300 civilians killed, ≈400 civilians kidnapped

The Deir ez-Zor offensive (2016) was an ISIL military operation, during which it took over the northern suburbs of Deir ez-Zor on 16 January 2016, and killed from 135 to 300 people, while also kidnapping about 400 others.

== Background ==
In 2011, the Syrian Civil War began after an uprising against president Bashar al-Assad. The rebels took over Deir ez-Zor governorate except for about half of Deir ez-Zor city which stayed in the hands of the government. However, in 2014 the Islamic State of Iraq and the Levant (ISIL) took over all the areas formerly held by the rebels. Since that time, ISIL have tried repeatedly to take over the remaining part of Deir ez-Zor city.

== The offensive ==
=== Initial assault and massacre ===
On 16 January 2016, ISIL militants launched an attack on Deir ez-Zor. In the initial fighting, at least 35 Syrian Arab Army soldiers and allied militia fighters were killed. The group used "six suicide bombers first and they tried to break into military positions but they failed," according to the government. The British-based SOHR added that the group "carried out several assaults" during the day.

After parts of the city were overrun by ISIL, pro-government fighters and their families were among those attacked in the neighborhoods of Baghiliya and Ayyash. The Syrian government and state media said that 250-300 people were killed, including some by beheading; the SOHR had differing numbers, reporting 135 fatalities, of which 85 were civilians and 50 soldiers. ISIL also captured an army weapons depot and seized tanks. SOHR added that ISIL kidnapped about 400 civilians from families of pro-government fighters. "There is genuine fear for their lives, there is a fear that the group might execute them as it has done before in other areas." "Abu Hamza Al-Ansari”, a top ISIL commander in the province, was killed during an ISIS offensive on Ayyash and Al-Bughayliyah by the 104th Airborne Brigade.

ISIL forces continued to advance on areas held by the Syrian Government north west of Deir ez-Zor City, taking areas south and west of Baghiliya.

=== Attempted counterattack ===
Counter-strikes by Russian Air Force fighter jets, in support of Syrian army forces, were reported to take back the areas. Around 60 ISIL fighters were killed in airstrikes, according to the Russian defense ministry.

On 19 January, ISIL launched a new offensive against government territory, taking advantage of a dust storm that all but grounded Russian warplanes. Over 80 ISIS fighters were killed while battling government forces in the Al-Baghayliyah District. 75-82 government soldiers (11 of them from the NDF) and 12 pro-government Shaytat tribesmen also died. On the next day, a pro-government source claimed government forces recaptured the Saiqa Camp, the Tal Kroum hilltop and the Ayyash weapons depot. However, subsequent reports confirmed they were still ISIL-held. Later on 20 January, the Al-Baghaliyeh district also fell to ISIL and the jihadists took the Missile Battalion Base, south of Deir Ezzor, and the Al Mari'iyah farms. Earlier in the day, a Russian air force operation delivered 50 tonnes of humanitarian aid to civilians in Al-Baghaliyeh. The advances left ISIL in control of at least 60% of Deir ez-Zor city. At this time, ISIL released 270 of the 400 civilians kidnapped over the weekend.

On 21 January, the Syrian army launched an offensive against the Baghiliya district, with 11 soldiers being killed.

== Aftermath ==
On 22 January, Russian airstrikes killed 44 in ISIL-controlled Tala'a district and the following day, further airstrikes killed 63 in Khasham.

On 26 January, six civilians were killed by a mortar round and a Syrian Arab Army Brigade General was killed.

On 28 January, ISIL launched an offensive against Al-Baghayliyah District in order to seize the Al-Rawad Hill, Al-Jazeera University, and Firat Al-Sham Hotel. The attack was cut short by Syrian and Russian Air Force airstrikes. On 30 January, ISIL launched an attack along the Cinema Fouad Street inside the Al-Rashidiyah District and against the Al-Haweeqa District.

On 11 March, the Syrian Arab Army's Central Command announced their intention to lift ISIS's siege of Deir ez-Zor by capturing Palmyra and the Palmyra-Deir ez-Zor highway.

On 18 May, the Syrian Army claimed that over 200 ISIS militants had been killed after a government assault in the western district of the besieged city. However, this number is disputed by the Syrian Observatory of Human Rights who give a more conservative estimate of 50 ISIS militants killed.

== Casualties ==
Syrian Arab Army casualties were 200 killed, of whom 48 were executed by ISIL. 110 ISIL fighters had also died, including 30 suicide bombers.

== Reactions ==
An unnamed branch of the Syrian government condemned the "horrific massacre against the residents of Baghiliya in Deir al-Zor".

== See also ==
- Deir ez-Zor Governorate campaign
- List of massacres during the Syrian Civil War
- List of wars and battles involving ISIL
