= September 2016 Urum al-Kubra aid convoy attack =

Attack on a medical aid convoy by Syrian government forces

- Part of the Syrian Civil War
- Urum al-Kubra (Syria)
- Date: 19 September 2016
- Time: Began sometime between 7:12 - 7:50 p.m. or at around 8 p.m.
- Location: Urum al-Kubra, Aleppo Governorate, Syria; 36.151583°N 36.967750°E
- Participants: Syrian government (per UN)
- Deaths: 14
- Property damage: 17 food-aid trucks destroyed

A United Nations and Syrian Arab Red Crescent aid convoy unloading at a warehouse along Highway 60 in the rebel-held city of Urum al-Kubra, approximately 15 kilometers (9 mi) west of the city of Aleppo in the Aleppo Governorate of Syria, was destroyed during a late night attack on 19 September 2016, during the Syrian Civil War. The UN accused the Syrian government of a carrying out the attack in a "meticulously planned and ruthlessly carried out" air strike, first dropping barrel bombs, then rocketing the convoy, and finally strafing survivors with machine gun fire. In all, fourteen aid workers were killed in the strike.

== Background ==
In 2016, the Deir ez-Zor subdistrict of eastern Syria was one of the few remaining Syrian government strongholds in the embattled country. On 17 September 2016, the U.S. Coalition bombed Syrian troops near the city resulting in the deaths of between 90 and 106 Syrian Arab Army soldiers and the wounding of 110 more soldiers. The attack triggered "a diplomatic firestorm", with Russia calling an emergency United Nations Security Council meeting in response to the incident. On 19 September, the Syrian government declared a week long ceasefire that it had been adhering to over, effective at 7:00pm (DST), which was exactly when the ceasefire was set to expire. Shortly afterwards on that same day, sometime between 7:12 - 7:50pm or at around 8pm., the aid convoy was attacked.

== Events ==
=== Departure and arrival ===
According to the New York Times, the Red Crescent aid convoy of 31 trucks departed at 10:50 a.m from within Syrian government-held territory. Since the convoy was originally meant to have been accompanied by U.N. staff members it was visibly marked with both United Nations and Red Crescent logos. There were, however, no UN staff members aboard since the Syrian government had reportedly prevented them from leaving with the convoy. This single U.N. approved convoy, manned entirely by Syrian Red Crescent members, has been variously referred to as a U.N. convoy, Red Crescent convoy, and as a U.N.-Red Crescent convoy. The New York Times reported that aid workers accompanying the aid convoy were members of the Syrian Arab Red Crescent, which consists of "self-governed local branches in rebel territory" while it is "state-supervised in government areas." About an hour after departing, the aid convoy reached the Syrian government controlled "Death Square" roundabout (named years ago after a car accident), the last government held checkpoint before entering rebel territory, where the convoy's Red Crescent volunteers from Aleppo switched places with Red Crescent volunteers from rebel-held Urum al-Kubra. The convoy arrived in Urum al-Kubra at around 2:00 p.m. that day. A Russian drone had been monitoring the convoy but Russian officials said that it had ceased operations at 1:40pm, although rebel sources said that the drone was still in the area at around 5:00 p.m.

=== Attack ===
The attack began sometime between 7:12 - 8:00pm and ended at around midnight that same day. A relief worker who survived the attack said helicopters commenced the strike by dropping several barrel bombs. This was followed by jets flying conducting airstrikes, including strafing runs. A picture released after the attack shows the tail fin of a Russian-made OFAB 250-270 bomb lodged in debris. United States officials believe that Russian Sukhoi Su-24 aircraft took part as well. The International Committee of the Red Cross reported that 20 civilians were killed and that 18 of the 31 vehicles in the convoy were destroyed.

== Reactions ==
=== United Nations response ===
The United Nations condemned the attack. Although they initially described the attack as an airstrike, they later retreated from this and referred to it simply as an attack.

=== U.S. Coalition response ===
The United States and its coalition partners accused the Russian and Syrian governments of carrying out the attacks, and laid accusations (although not official charges) of war crimes. John Kerry, citing this incident, broke off bilateral ceasefire discussions with Russia. Syrian rebel media outlets and outlets running from the member states of the coalition largely supported the coalition's accusations.

=== Syrian and Russian response ===
The Syrian and Russian governments denied the charges and instead blamed the attack on terrorists groups operating in Aleppo. The Russian government further accused the United States of being aware of Russia's innocence and of using this attack to deflect attention away from the coalition's then recent attack against the Syrian government, which the U.S. denied. Syrian and Russian media outlets, as well as many of the outlets of their allies, largely supported their own government's accusations.

== 2017 United Nations report ==
On 1 March 2017, the Office of the United Nations High Commissioner for Human Rights (OHCHR) debunked the Russian and Syrian propaganda and issued a report on human rights situation during the battle of Aleppo, finding that the Syrian Air Force deliberately targeted the humanitarian convoy, and that this amounts to a war crime.
