= 2017 Abu Kamal offensive =

Military offensive

- Part of the Eastern Syria campaign and the Russian military intervention in the Syrian civil war
- SAA and ISF advances along the border
Date	23 October – 6 December 2017 (1 month, 1 week and 6 days)
Location	Deir ez-Zor Governorate, Syria 34.4463°N 40.9210°E
Result	Decisive Syrian Army and allies victory
Territorial changes	Abu Kamal changes hands three times before being captured by the Syrian Army on 19 November

Belligerents
(Syria) Syrian Arab Republic: Syrian Arab Armed Forces; Russia: Russian Aerospace Forces; Iran: IRGC; Allied militias: Hezbollah; PMF militias Liwa Fatemiyoun; Liwa al-Quds	Islamic State

Commanders and leaders
(Syria) Maj. Gen. Suheil al-Hassan (Iran) Maj. Gen. Qasem Soleimani	(Islamic State) Abu Bakr al-Baghdadi (possibly); Abu Ruqayya al-Ansari (Islamic State) Hani Al-Thalji † (field commander) (Islamic State) Abu Munzer Al-Shishani † (field commander) (Islamic State) Abu Mohammad Al-Safi † (field commander)

Units involved
Syrian Army: Republican Guard; 124th Brigade; 125th Brigade; Tiger Forces; 4th Armoured Division; 42nd Brigade; Syrian Arab Air Force; PMF militias: Kata'ib al-Imam Ali; Kata'ib Hezbollah; Harakat Hezbollah al-Nujaba; 12th Mechanized Brigade; Asa'ib Ahl al-Haq; Kafeel Zaynab Brigade; Russian Armed Forces: Russian Air Force; Russian special operations forces (non combat role)	Military of the Islamic State

Strength
Several thousand: 8,000 Lebanese, Iraqi, Afghan and Palestinian fighters; Tiger Forces: 450; Republican Guard's 124th Brigade: 300; 4th Division's 42nd Brigade: 300	5,000–10,000+

Casualties and losses
376+ killed	352+ killed
- 269 civilians killed

The 2017 Abu Kamal offensive, codenamed Operation Fajr-3 (translated Operation Dawn 3), was a military offensive launched by the Syrian Arab Army and its allies against members of the Islamic State (IS) in the Deir ez-Zor Governorate. The aim of the offensive was to capture IS's last urban stronghold in Syria, the border town of Abu Kamal. This offensive was a part of the larger Eastern Syria campaign.

The offensive took place at the same time as the Western Iraq campaign, which was aimed at recapturing the IS-held border town of Al-Qa'im and the rest of western Iraq.

== The offensive ==
=== Advance to the border ===
On 23 October, government forces started an offensive to reach Abu Kamal; over the next 48 hours, 42 IS militants and 27 pro-government fighters were killed as IS attempted to halt the military's advance. By 25 October, IS managed to push government troops out of the town Al-Asharah, as well as parts of Al-Quriyah, along the western banks of the Euphrates river. Meanwhile, heavy fighting raged at the IS-held strategic T-2 Pumping Station in the southwestern countryside of Abu Kamal, with the Syrian Army and Hezbollah reportedly managing to surround the station on three sides. On 26 October, the Army and its allies captured the T-2 Pumping Station, after which they set up positions 45 km (28 mi) from Abu Kamal. The government's advances were backed up by heavy Russian air-strikes.

On 27 October, as government forces were within 40 km (25 mi) of Abu Kamal, IS was preparing the town's defenses. The next day, an IS counter-attack pushed back government troops in the area of the T-2 Station and the militants once again attacked the town of Al-Quriyah in the Euphrates river valley, seizing parts of it. On 29 October, government troops re-positioned 65 km (40 mi) southwest of Abu Kamal, while they also withdrew from Al-Quriyah and Mahkan to Mayadin after suffering heavy casualties in several ambushes.

By 31 October, the ISIL attack against the T-2 Station was repelled and government forces were once again within 50 km (31 mi) of Abu Kamal. The next day, six Russian Tu-22MZ long-range bombers that took off from air bases in Russia struck IS targets outside Abu Kamal. On 3 November, Iraqi security forces captured the Iraqi town of Al-Qa'im, on the opposite side of the border from Abu Kamal. Late that day, Iraqi paramilitary forces crossed the border from Al-Qa'im and attacked IS positions in the Hiri area on the outskirts of Abu Kamal, but were repelled back across the border by the following day. At the same time as the Iraqi cross-border attack, Russia reportedly conducted a massive air-strike on IS targets in a residential area of Abu Kamal. On 5 November, government forces pushed within 15 km (9.3 mi) of Abu Kamal, reaching the Iraqi border.

=== First attack on the city ===
After the Syrian Army met up with Iraqi militias on the border on 8 November, the Syrian military and its allies launched an assault on Abu Kamal, quickly encircling and entering the city. During the fighting, Hezbollah, which had hundreds of fighters take part in the battle, crossed into Iraq from where it then assaulted Abu Kamal along with the Iraqi PMF militias. The Syrian Army was also reported to have entered Iraq and then attacked Abu Kamal from Al-Qa'im. The entrance of both the Syrian Army and its allies into Iraq was reportedly with the permission of the Iraqi military. That evening, pro-government sources reported Abu Kamal had been captured, while the pro-opposition SOHR denied this and stated only parts of the town had been seized. The next day, SOHR confirmed the capture of Abu Kamal after IS forces withdrew from the city through a northern escape route they managed to maintain. Syrian Army High Command also officially declared the capture of Abu Kamal and issued a statement saying: ″The liberation of the city is of great importance since it represents an announcement of the fall of ISIS terrorist organization project in the region, in general, and a collapse of the illusions of its sponsors and supporters to divide it.″ The military subsequently started combing the city as part of demining operations. Meanwhile, pro-government forces continued their operations in the area and reportedly captured the Hamdan Military Airbase, north of Abu Kamal.

Late on 9 November, an IS counterattack recaptured 40 percent of Abu Kamal, including several neighborhoods in the northern, northeastern and northwestern part of the town. The next day, the fighting came close to the city center. Meanwhile, Hezbollah reported the leader of IS, Abu Bakr al-Baghdadi, was in Abu Kamal during the assault on the town. On 11 November, heavy airstrikes were being conducted against IS, in an effort by Syrian government forces to maintain their presence in the southern part of the city, and also to push IS fighters out of Abu Kamal. At this point it became apparent that the earlier IS retreat from Abu Kamal was conducted so to lure government troops into a trap which involved surprise attacks by militants hiding inside tunnels in the city center. The counter-assault involved suicide bombers and rocket attacks. The military and its allied militias suffered heavy casualties and by the end of the day IS managed to fully recapture the city, forcing pro-government forces to withdraw to one to two kilometers from the city. Meanwhile, the PMF was reported to have seized the nearby border crossing with Iraq.

=== Second attack on the city ===
On 12 November, Syrian government forces launched an assault towards Abu Kamal from Mayadin, quickly advancing through the desert and reaching positions 25–35 km (16–22 mi) west of the city. On 17 November, Syrian Army forces stormed the city again, capturing it by 19 November.

Fighting in the surrounding countryside continued until 6 December. During the fighting between 15 November and 3 December 447 fighters on both sides were killed. During this time, government forces advanced along the western bank of the Euphrates, so to besiege a pocket of IS territory southeast of Mayadin. The pocket was surrounded on 21 November, and in the following days the Army slowly cleared it. By 28 November, the pocket was eliminated and the town of Al-Quriyah was captured. The military then continued with its operations to link up forces advancing southeast of Mayadin with those at Abu Kamal. By 5 December, they were 10 km (6.2 mi) from achieving this and on 6 December the link-up came, with the whole western bank of the Euphrates cleared after IS forces retreated to the western countryside of Deir ez-Zor. During the final push along the Euphrates, large numbers of IS suicide car bombers were sent against the advancing government forces, inflicting heavy casualties on the Army.

== See also ==
- 2014 Eastern Syria offensive
- Battle of Mosul (2016–2017)
- Raqqa campaign (2016–2017)
- Central Syria campaign (2017)
- 2017 Mayadin offensive
