= September 2016 Deir ez-Zor airstrike =

Series of airstrikes in the Syrian Civil War

- Part of the Battle of Deir ez-Zor and the American-led intervention in the Syrian civil war
- Jabal Tardah (Syria)
- Date: 17 September 2016
- Location: Deir ez-Zor Airport, Deir ez-Zor, Syria
- Cause: Airstrikes by CJTF-OIR aircraft
- Participants: CJTF-OIR (coalition): United States; Denmark; Australia; United Kingdom
- Deaths: 60–90 soldiers

On 17 September 2016, the United States-led coalition in Syria launched an airstrike near the Deir ez-Zor Airport lasting from 3:55 p.m. to 4:56 p.m. local time, in which Syrian Arab Army (SAA) soldiers were killed conducting operations against the Islamic State. Russia reported that at least 62 SAA soldiers were killed, while the Syrian Observatory for Human Rights (SOHR) said at least 80 were killed and 120 wounded. The United States said that the intended target was Islamic State militants and that the attack on Syrian soldiers was due to a misidentification of ground forces while the Syrian and Russian governments claimed that it was an intentional attack against Syrian troops. The attack triggered "a diplomatic firestorm" with Russia calling an emergency United Nations Security Council meeting. Later, the Syrian government called off a ceasefire that had been the result of months of intense diplomatic efforts by the U.S. and Russian governments.

After the cancellation of the ceasefire by the Syrian government, an aid convoy near Aleppo was attacked, which the U.S. coalition's governments called a retaliatory attack by the Syrian and/or Russian governments, an accusation denied by both governments. The dispute led to an end of U.S.–Russian bilateral peace talks on Syria. Russia used the air raid to justify enhancing its missile air defenses in Syria and the U.S. Secretary of State John Kerry would go on to claim that the breakdown of the ceasefire helped lead to the eventual capture of rebel-held East Aleppo by Syrian government forces. The attack also led to Islamic State of Iraq and the Levant, which was besieging the Syrian-government held city of Deir ez-Zor, capturing multiple strategic points around the Deir ez-Zor airport.

== Background ==
=== Accusations of previous attacks ===
Previously, in December 2015, the Syrian government made an accusation, rejected by the U.S., that United States forces killed 3 Syrian soldiers and wounded 13 others during a Sunday evening attack on a camp in Deir al-Zour province. The U.S. led coalition had been targeting ISIL militants in Syria since September 2014 although it has never coordinated any attacks with the Syrian government, whose President the U.S. had been trying to overthrow.

=== U.S.–Russian brokered Syrian ceasefire ===
On Monday 12 September 2016 at 7 p.m. Syria time (1600 GMT), a U.S. and Russian brokered ceasefire, which was intended to last one week, had come into effect. The ceasefire had been the result of months of "intensive diplomacy," primarily between the U.S. Secretary of State John Kerry and the Russian Foreign Minister Sergey Lavrov, but also between U.S. President Barack Obama and Russian President Vladimir Putin, that had begun in July 2016. At the time of this attack, the ceasefire had been in place for more than its fifth day and was less than 48 hours away from its completion. Had its completion come to pass, it would have resulted in the U.S. and Russia jointly creating and running, per the ceasefire agreement, "the Joint Implementation Group" – an intelligence sharing group that would have been dedicated to coordinating U.S. and Russian attacks against al-Qaeda and ISIL in Syria. Some of the United States' top national security officials, particularly the Pentagon, were opposed to the creation of the Joint Implementation Group, fearing that its implementation would allow the Russian government to obtain important information about the functioning of the U.S. military. The agreement would have also seen the U.S. gain a veto, ensured by Russia, over the Syrian government's air force's combat missions over opposition and civilian-controlled areas, which at that time included the city of Aleppo.

=== Siege of Deir ez-Zor ===
Deir ez-Zor Governorate at the time had one of the few remaining Syrian Government strongholds in Eastern Syria. In May 2015, Islamic State of Iraq and the Levant (also referred to as IS, ISIS, ISIL, and Daesh) militants launched an offensive that captured Palmyra, most of Deir ez-Zor (the capital city of Deir ez-Zor Governorate) and its surrounding outskirts, and cut off the Syrian government's remaining ground supply line to Deir ez-Zor. Those parts of the city and its outskirts controlled by the Syrian government were then effectively under siege by ISIL, leaving supplies to be solely delivered by transport helicopters. Consequently, ISIL began launching frequent attacks against the Deir ez-Zor Airport with the aim of halting the delivery of supplies (these attacks would continue until the Syrian government fully secured the airbase on 10 September 2017). Government resupply was made possible by the Syrian government's control of the Thardah Mountains, a nearby artillery base, and other areas near the airport since control of these areas prevented ISIL from attacking resupply aircraft flying into and out of the airport. For this reason, Deir ez-Zor Airport and its surrounding areas were considered by the Syrian government to be strategically crucial to preventing ISIL from taking full control of Deir ez-Zor. The Thardah Mountains (Jabal Turdah in Arabic) refers to a group of hills and mountains west and south-west of the Deir ez-Zor Airbase, on some of which there were set up Syrian government defensive positions referred to as points. This range includes Thardah hill (point 1) in the south-east of the range, Kroum hill (tal Kroum) in the north of the range, a mountain (point 2) in between these last two hills that is also referred to as Thartah mountain, a hill (point 3) in the south-west of the range, and others. A pro-Syrian government news outlet reported that on 17 September 2016, prior to the airstrikes, the Syrian Army was in control of Kroum hill and points 1 and 2.

== Events ==
=== Aircraft involved ===
The Russian Defence Ministry said the attack was conducted by four jets, including two A-10 (a single-seat aircraft operated solely by the U.S. military) and two F-16 close air support and ground attack aircraft and United States Central Command stated that the attack was carried out by American, British, Danish, and Australian warplanes. The Royal Danish Air Force released a statement saying that two of its F-16's were involved in the airstrikes and the British released a statement saying that their armed Reaper drones also took part in the operation. The Australian Defence Force released a statement that two Royal Australian Air Force (RAAF) F/A-18A were involved in the strike together with a RAAF E-7A Wedgetail AEW&C aircraft.

=== Incorrect information passed through the deconfliction hotline ===
At the time, the U.S. central command in Qatar was in communication with Russia, an ally of the Syrian government, via a special U.S.–Russia deconfliction hotline. According to the U.S.'s investigation into this incident, this hotline was used for the first time on 17 September 2016 to inform the Russians about these impending airstrikes, which were planned to attack two target areas approximately 3 to 6 km southwest of the Deir Ezzor airfield. The U.S. coalition operator misinformed his Russian counterpart about the location of the impending strikes, telling the Russians that they were to occur 9 km south of the Deir Ezzor airfield when they were actually planned to occur 9 km south of Deir Ezzor city and approximately 3 to 6 km south of the airfield. This mistake, the coalition's report notes, "may have affected the Russian response to the notification and caused considerable confusion in the DT process."

=== The Coalition raid ===
On 17 September 2016, the U.S.-led coalition began attacking Syrian troops at 3:55 p.m. Syria time (13:55Z). The bombs hit Syrian Army positions on the Tharda Mountain and at a nearby artillery base. Russia and Syria reported that the attack was carried out at 5 p.m. by the U.S.-led coalition, without naming the countries involved. The New York Times was reportedly informed by an anonymous CENTCOM official that "the strike began in the early evening, when planes attacked a group of vehicles that American surveillance aircraft had been watching for several days" after which U.S. military intelligence concluded that the group, which reportedly included at least one tank, belonged to ISIL. This same official then reportedly said that "the attack went on for about 20 minutes, with the planes destroying the vehicles and gunning down dozens of people in the open desert."

Russia called the U.S. Central Command (U.S. CENTCOM) in Qatar at 4:25 p.m. (14:25Z) but was unable to find the designated contact, who was, according to U.S. CENTCOM, away from his desk at the time. According to the U.S. coalition's investigation, the Russian operator "elected to wait to speak to their usual point of contact (POC) rather than pass the information immediately to the Battle Director" which "led to a delay of 27 minutes, during which 15 of the 37 strikes were conducted." Although according to the coalition report the Russian operator had elected to wait for his POC, there was also reportedly a subsequent Russian call to U.S. CENTCOM that was answered at 4:52 p.m. (14:52Z) and that resulted in the airstrikes being called off "within minutes," according to a U.S. CENTCOM spokesman, who also said that "a good amount of strikes" had already taken place. According to the U.S. coalition's investigation, at 4:56 p.m. (14:56Z) coalition aircraft ceased fire and left the area.

An anonymous senior officer from the 123rd Regiment of the Syrian Arab Army (whose unit was reportedly one of those targeted) told pro-government Al Masdar News that more than half of the Syrian Army soldiers killed by the airstrikes died at points 1 and 2, which are right next to (and to the west of) the Deir ez-Zor airport, and that "the majority of the airstrikes were not conducted near the front-lines" [of where ISIL and the Syrian Army were battling]. According to the pro-Syrian government outlet that conducted this interview, the airstrikes "took out" the Syrian Army's defensive positions at points 1 and 2, points that had formed their last lines of defense of the airport, causing the Syrian army units fighting at the outskirts of Jabal Thardeh to retreat to defend these points and that one week later, ISIL had forced the Syrian Army to completely withdraw from even these last two points.

==== Casualties ====
The initial casualty estimate given by the Russian Syrian government was that 62 Syrian government soldiers were killed, while the Syrian Observatory for Human Rights (SOHR) reported the death toll to be over 80 with 120 wounded. The next day, the Syrian Observatory for Human Rights reported the death toll to be 90, with 30 wounded. In late September, Al Masdar News reported that the Syrian government said that 106 soldiers were killed at Jabal Thardeh by the Coalition, more than half of them in these strikes.

=== Subsequent ISIL attack on the mountain ===
An unnamed military source claimed that an ISIL ground attack was conducted just seven minutes after the Coalition attack. Pro-Syrian government outlets later asserted that this claim provided evidence of U.S.–ISIL collaboration. The ISIL attack allowed them to take control of Tharda mountain, which was seen as strategic as it looks over the government-held Deir ez-Zor military airbase.

On 17 September, according to pro-government sources, the Syrian Army recaptured some points and by the end of the day, after heavy ground fighting combined with Russian and Syrian airstrikes that left over 38 ISIL fighters dead, the Syrian Army recaptured all of the positions they had lost on the mountain (including Tall Kroum). During the clashes, a Syrian MiG warplane was shot down by ISIL over the mountain and the pilot was killed. The next day, ISIL was once again in control of the mountain after the military withdrew, creating a serious threat to the airport's southern flank, according to Al-Masdar.

Pro-government media reported that the Syrian Army would later once again recapture some points although they would not able to hold onto them, soon losing them in an ISIL attack, launched on 21 September from Point 3, which saw ISIL take points 1 and 2 and establish full control over Jabal Thardeh. Pro-government media reported that in early October 2016 the Syrian Army recaptured Point 1 at Jabal Thardeh, paving the way to advances near the Panorama Checkpoint and Kroum Hill, and launched another attack that targeted Point 2 at Jabal Thardeh.

== Consequences ==
The attack triggered "a diplomatic firestorm", with Russia calling an emergency United Nations Security Council meeting in response to the incident, during which both the U.S. and Russian ambassadors chastised each other. The U.S. coalition declared that the attacks had been intended to hit the Islamic State while Russia and Syria declared that the Syrian government had been the intended target, with two motives being claimed: the derailment of the ceasefire (to prevent the implementation of the Joint Implementation Group) and/or to aid ISIL's capture of Deir ez-Zor.

=== Immediate military consequences ===
It was reported by a pro-Syrian government news outlet that the day after the attack, Syrian government forces began firing at a coalition reconnaissance drone flying over the Thardeh mountains, whereas prior to the attack the Syrian government had essentially ignored the coalition's drones. On 6 October 2016, after Russia had recently deployed additional missile defense systems to Syria and after U.S. media indications that the coalition may attack the Syrian government, a Russian military spokesman gave a strong warning to the U.S. against attacking the Syrian military. In reference to the Deir ez-Zor attack, the spokesman said that "we have taken all the necessary measures to prevent any such 'mistakes' with regard to Russian servicemen and military facilities in Syria" and he further warned the U.S. coalition that in case of a perceived coalition threat to the Syrian military, the "Russian air defense missile crews will unlikely have time to clarify via the hotline the exact flight programme of the missiles or the ownership of their carriers."

=== Breakdown of ceasefire and aid convoy attack ===
A ceasefire, which had been the result of almost three month of "intensive diplomacy" primarily between U.S. Secretary of State John Kerry and Russian Foreign Minister Sergey Lavrov, but also between U.S. President Barack Obama and Russian President Vladimir Putin, had been in place in Syria at the time of the coalition attack. Days after the attack, on Monday 19 September, exactly seven days after the ceasefire had come into effect, the Syrian government declared the ceasefire over effective at 7:00 p.m. (Damascus Time) that same day. Shortly afterwards that same day, beginning sometime between 7:12 – 7:50 p.m. or at around 8 p.m., an aid convoy near Aleppo was attacked with the U.S. and its allies blaming the Syrian government for the attack, an accusation rejected by the Syrian government. The U.S. State Department later repeatedly cited the aid convoy attack as being the primary reason for the failure of the cessation of hostilities agreement as well as an important reason behind John Kerry's decision to end the U.S.'s bilateral Syrian peace talks with Russia. The Russian government, however, considered the Deir ez-Zor attack to be the key event that led to the breakdown of the ceasefire agreement.

==== Battle of Aleppo ====
In an 18 December 2016 interview, the U.S. Secretary of State John Kerry stated that he believes that had the ceasefire not collapsed then the United States could have prevented the December capture of rebel-held Eastern Aleppo by the Syrian Army since the ceasefire agreement would have made it so that "Russia gave us [the U.S.] a veto over their flights and over what they were doing in the area, had we set up a joint cooperative effort," which could have resulted in "a different situation there conceivably now if we’d been able to do that."

=== Diplomatic and media reactions ===
The coalition asserted that the Deir ez-Zor bombing of Syrian troops was accidental and the U.S. "relayed our regret through the Russian Federation for the unintentional loss of life of Syrian forces fighting ISIL" while the Syrian and Russian governments said that they believed that the strikes were intentional which led to accusations, unequivocally rejected by the U.S. and its allies, that the coalition was acting as ISIL's airforce. That day, the U.S. military said in a statement that "coalition forces would not intentionally strike a known Syrian military unit" while the Russian Foreign Ministry Spokeswoman was quoted as saying that "after today’s attack on the Syrian army, we come to the terrible conclusion that the White House is defending the Islamic State." The Syrian government released a statement saying that the air strikes were "conclusive evidence" of its long-held assertion that the U.S. and its allies were supporting ISIL and other jihadist groups as part of an effort to oust President Bashar al-Assad.

The Syrian government's accusation that the U.S. and its allies had bombed Syrian forces to support ISIL was circulated widely and taken seriously by pro-government Syrian news outlets and to various extents among the outlets of some of Syria's allies, while very few media outlets run from the coalition's member states took the accusations seriously, largely considering them to be conspiracy theories. Despite the U.S. coalition never indicating that the attack was intended to help the Syrian government, some analysts and media outlets in the U.S. and the U.K. considered the attack "a rare, even unprecedented attempt to assist regime forces battling ISIS in the area." Faysal Itani, a senior fellow at the Atlantic Council, said that "U.S. airstrikes on ISIS in such close proximity to regime positions are unusual" and that the strikes "arguably constitute close air support for [the Syrian] regime." One BBC analyst criticized the U.S. coalition for planning a strike against ISIL that would have had the effect of aiding the Syrian government.

Both the Russian and Syrian governments considered this airstrike to be "proof" that the U.S. was sympathetic to ISIL, an accusation that they would later repeatedly try to justify by presenting what they considered to be evidence. This claimed evidence can be exemplified by the Russian U.N. permanent representative's statements, as reported by a pro-Syrian government outlet, during the special U.N. security council meeting, which the U.S. envoy to the U.N. later referred to as "a stunt". During the security council meeting, the Russian representative stated that "Russia believes the United States attack on the Syrian Army was not a mistake," declared that the "US Airstrike was intended to disrupt the ceasefire process and to drive the situation out of control," and suggested that "the airstrike has been conducted in order to derail the operation of the Joint Implementation Group and actually prevent it from being set in motion." He went on to ask accusatory questions such as why the U.S. would suddenly want to help the Syrian Army after years of doing nothing and why the U.S. did nothing when ISIL took Palmyra. The timing of ISIL's subsequent attack on the Syrian troops that reportedly occurred 7 minutes after the air strikes is also frequently claimed by pro-Syrian government outlets to be evidence of the U.S. government helping ISIL. All levels of the Russian and Syrian governments would continue to repeatedly refer to this airstrike.

=== 2016 Mosul offensive ===
For the 2016 Mosul offensive against ISIL in Iraq, a neighbor of Syria, the coalition had originally planned to leave Mosul's Western corridor open for ISIL militants to flee into Syria. The two largest Syrian cities that these militants could flee to were Raqqa, ISIL's self-proclaimed capital, and Deir Ez-zor. In light of the coalition's attacks at Deir Ez-zor, this led to concerns among Syria, Iran, and some Iraqi Shia groups, that the actual intent of the corridor was to effect an accumulation of these ISIL fighters around Syrian government troops at Deir Ez-zor so that ISIL would then attack and capture this city where proponents of this claim often indicate that this plot's purpose would be to reduce Syrian and Iranian government influence in the region by cutting the Shia Crescent. Specifically, according to a Russian government news agency which was reportedly citing an unnamed diplomat, the concern was that "more than 9,000 Islamic State (IS, formerly ISIS, ISIL) militants will be redeployed from Mosul to the eastern regions of Syria to carry out a major offensive operation, which involves capturing Deir ez-Zor and Palmyra."

In a 12 October 2016 address to Iraqi civilian and military leadership and to Iraqi Popular Mobilization Forces (PMU), Hezbollah's Secretary General Sayyed Hassan Nasrallah informed the audience about his belief that "the Americans intend to repeat [the] Fallujah plot when they opened a way for ISIL to escape towards eastern Syria before the Iraqi warplanes targeted the terrorists’ convoy, warning that the same deceptive scheme is possible to be carried out in Mosul." On 20 October 2016, according to al-Masdar, the Iraqi PMU began planning an operation to close ISIL's escape route from Mosul. Against the wishes of the U.S. coalition in Iraq, which supported the Iraqi forces against ISIL in the Battle of Mosul, the PMF stated on 29 October that they had launched an (eventually successful) offensive towards the west of Mosul aiming to capture villages west of Mosul and reach the town of Tal Afar in order to prevent ISIL fighters from retreating into neighboring Syria or receiving any reinforcement for their defense of Mosul. They were tasked with recapturing around 14,000 km^{2} of territory from ISIL and they also stated that they would not enter Mosul.

== Coalition investigation ==
Shortly after the attack, the U.S. coalition began an internal investigation, led by U.S. Brigadier General Richard Coe and another unnamed coalition officer, into how the airstrikes could have targeted Syrian government forces. A redacted copy of the report's executive summary was released to the public on 29 November 2016. One of the conclusions of the report was that the attacks had been conducted "in good faith" that they were targeting ISIL militants and that they were consequently "in accordance with the law of armed conflict and the applicable rules of engagement for all nations involved." The internal investigation, which interviewed "70 U.S. and coalition personnel" had "found no evidence of misconduct" and went on to list lessons to be learned from the airstrikes, including areas for improvement.

According to the report, "both target areas contained tunnels and defensive fighting positions" and it went on to assert that the soldiers manning these defensive positions "wore a mix of tradition wear, civilian attire and military style clothing that lacked uniformity," which was reportedly a factor leading to the conclusion that they were ISIL militants. Another factor was "information flow" since "concerns raised by the Distributed Ground Station (DGS) during pre and post-strike approval that the ground force could not be Da'esh were not communicated to the DT Chief or TEA." On 30 November 2016, the Australian Defence Force released a statement referring to the report and also stated that the forces were "not wearing recognisable military uniforms or displaying indentifying (sic) flags or markings".

== Immediate Coalition response to the attack ==
- United States: Initially, the US Armed Forces did not outright admit that Coalition planes hit Syrian troops, but later the U.S.-led Coalition admitted their planes carried out the attack. The U.S. stated they halted the strikes as soon as they became aware of the Syrian Army presence and regretted the unintentional loss of life.
- Australia: Australia's Department of Defence acknowledged its participation "among a number of international aircraft". It said it would "never intentionally target a known Syrian military unit or actively support Daesh (ISIS)" and offered its condolences.
- Denmark: Denmark's Ministry of Defence confirmed in a statement that 2 F-16s from the Royal Danish Air Force had participated in coalition airstrikes in Deir ez-Zor. Airstrikes were immediately stopped after it was revealed that they hit Syrian Army forces and the Defence Ministry "regretted" that the bombings hit anti-ISIL forces.
- UK: The United Kingdom's Ministry of Defence said in a statement it "can confirm that the UK participated in the recent coalition air strike ... fully co-operating with the coalition investigation" and that "The UK would not intentionally target Syrian military units."

== See also ==
- List of United States attacks on the Syrian government during the Syrian Civil War
- Siege of Deir ez-Zor (2014–2017)
- Deir ez-Zor clashes (disambiguation)
  - Deir ez-Zor offensive (January–February 2017)
- 2017 Shayrat missile strike
- Battle of Khasham
- Deir ez-Zor Governorate clashes

== External resources ==
- The redacted copy of the result of the coalition's investigation into the airstrikes
