= Deir ez-Zor Airport =

Deir ez-Zor Airport مطار دير الزور المدني
- IATA: DEZ; ICAO: OSDZ

Summary
- Airport type: Regional
- Owner: Government of Syria
- Operator: General Authority of Civil Aviation
- Serves: Deir ez-Zor, Syria
- Time zone: AST (UTC+03:00)
- Elevation AMSL: 700 ft (210 m)
- Coordinates: 35°17′07″N 040°10′33″E
- Website: deirezzorairport.gov.sy

Map
- Location of airport in Syria

Runways
Direction	Length		Surface
Direction	m	ft	Surface
10/28	3,000	9,843	Asphalt
- Source: DAFIF

Deir ez-Zor Airport (Arabic: مطار دير الزور) (IATA: DEZ, ICAO: OSDZ) is an airport serving Deir ez-Zor, a city in eastern Syria. It is located approximately 10 km (6 miles) southeast of the city center, situated along the Euphrates valley on the eastern edge of the Syrian desert.

== History ==
=== Establishment and early years ===
Deir ez-Zor Airport was established by the British during World War II as LG-416.

Before the Syrian civil war, airlines like Jazeera Airways and Syrian Air flew to destinations such as Damascus, Aleppo, Bahrain and Kuwait.

=== Syrian civil war ===
On 15 October 2012, heavy artillery and missiles strikes, originating in the airport, hit the city. On 24 November 2012, rebels were surrounding the airport. During the night of 6 December 2014, ISIL took control over the missile battalion to the northeast of the airport and stormed the airbase itself, but failed to seize it.

On 5 September 2017, Syrian special operations Tiger Forces and 17th Division troops started an offensive to eventually capture Thardeh Mountains (under the control of ISIL fighters since CJTF-OIR forces had conducted the September 2016 Deir ez-Zor air raid upon then-besieged Syrian Army soldiers) and lift ISIL's siege of the airport. On 9 September 2017, the Syrian SANA news agency reported that Syrian forces had broken the siege at the airport. Russia's Defense Ministry said the lifting of the siege had followed ″a massive airstrike by Russian Aerospace Forces.″

=== Contemporary era ===
In early 2026, renovation works on the airport began with the aim of restoring domestic and international flight operations. The works were completed in May 2026. The airport was reopened to flight operations on 2 August 2026 after 14 years of closure due to the Syrian civil war.

== Facilities ==
The airport sits at an elevation of 700 feet (213 m) above mean sea level. It has one asphalt paved runway, designated 10/28, measuring 3,000 by 45 metres (9,843 ft × 148 ft).

Runways
WNW	Length	Width	ESE
10 →	3,000 m 9,800 ft	45 m 148 ft	← 28

== Airlines and destinations ==
Airlines	Destinations
Jazeera Airways	Kuwait City
LEAV Aviation	Cologne/Bonn
Syrian Airlines	Damascus, Kuwait City

Deir ez-Zor Airport passenger destinations map (August 2026)
