= Eastern Syria campaign =

2017 Military operation

- Part of the Deir ez-Zor Governorate campaign and the Russian military intervention in the Syrian civil war
- SAA and ISF advances along the border
Date	14 September – 17 December 2017 (3 months and 3 days)
Location	Deir ez-Zor Governorate, Syria
Result	Decisive Syrian Army and allies victory; ISIL militants maintain presence in the desert

Belligerents
(Syria) Syrian Arab Republic: Syrian Armed Forces; Russia; Iran; Allied militias: Hezbollah; PMF militias Liwa Fatemiyoun	Islamic State

Commanders and leaders
(Syria) Maj. Gen. Suheil al-Hassan (Syria) Maj. Gen. Issam Zahreddine † (Syria) Brig. Gen. Ghassan Iskandar Tarraf (Republican Guard) (Russia) Lt. Gen. Valery Asapov † (Syrian 5th Corps commander) (Iran) Maj. Gen. Qasem Soleimani	(Islamic State) Abu Bakr al-Baghdadi

Units involved
Syria: Syrian Army; 1st Armoured Division; Republican Guard; Tiger Forces; 5th Corps; National Defence Forces; Shaitat tribal forces; Palestinian Syrian militias; Liwa al-Quds; Fatah al-Intifada; Galilee Forces; FPM; Russia: Russian Aerospace Forces; Special Operations Forces advisors; Russian Navy; Iran: IRGC; Hezbollah: Lebanese Hezbollah; Syrian Hezbollah	Military of ISIL: Garrison of Deir ez-Zor Province; Garrison of Homs Province

Strength
Several thousand	5,000–10,000+

Casualties and losses
601+ killed	985+ killed
- 987 civilians killed

The Eastern Syria campaign of September–December 2017 was a large-scale military operation of the Syrian Army (SAA) and its allies against the Islamic State of Iraq and the Levant (ISIL) during the Syrian Civil War. Its goal was to clear the city of Deir ez-Zor of any remaining ISIL forces, capture ISIL's de facto capital of Mayadin, as well as seize the border town of Abu Kamal, which became one of ISIL's final urban strongholds by the latter stages of the campaign.

The campaign was concurrent with the 2017 Western Iraq campaign, the Raqqa campaign conducted by the Syrian Democratic Forces (SDF) against ISIL's former capital city of Raqqa, as well as with the SDF's offensive in Deir ez-Zor province along the eastern banks of the Euphrates River.

== The campaign ==
=== Surrounding Deir ez-Zor ===
Following a large-scale summer campaign in central Syria, which succeeded in lifting the siege of Deir ez-Zor, the Syrian Army began operations to surround the remaining ISIL-held parts of the city. On 15 September, Russian Foreign Ministry spokeswoman Maria Zakharova announced the beginning of the army offensive across the Euphrates River, codenamed Assad's jump. Three days later, pro-government forces crossed the Euphrates River using pontoon bridges, and launched an offensive on the east bank of the city of Deir ez-Zor. By 16 October, the Syrian Army captured the town of al-Husayniyah on the other side of the Euphrates from Deir ez-Zor, establishing a siege of the ISIL-held part of the city.

=== Capture of Mayadin ===
Concurrently to its operations to encircle Deir ez-Zor, the Army launched an offensive towards Mayadin, ISIL's new capital, on 4 October, coming within 10 kilometers of the town. The military pushed into the town from the west on 6 October from the west, but were pushed back by 9 October.

On 12 October, the Syrian Army encircled Mayadin, after which they pushed into the western and northern parts of the city. Two days later, the city was captured and by 17 October, all land between Deir ez-Zor and Mayadin along the Euphrates was captured by government.

=== Deir ez-Zor city cleared ===
Following the surrounding of the ISIL-held part of Deir ez-Zor in mid-October, the Army started operations to clear the city on 17 October, quickly capturing three districts. On 26 October, government forces managed to capture the Saqr island and several days later captured two districts and a stadium in Deir ez-Zor.

On 2 November, ISIL's defense lines in Deir ez-Zor collapsed as the Tiger forces and Republican guard units made rapid advances in the central parts of the city, capturing Deir ez-Zor's largest district, Hamidiyah. This left ISIL forces squeezed in the four remaining neighborhoods under their control along the western bank of the Euphrates. By midnight, three neighborhoods were captured, leaving only one district under jihadist control. On 3 November, Syrian government forces completely captured the city.

=== Abu Kamal offensive ===
On 23 October, government forces started an offensive to reach Abu Kamal, managing to capture the strategic T-2 Pumping Station by 26 October coming within 40 kilometers of Abu Kamal as of 27 October. At this point, ISIL was preparing the town's defenses.

On 28 October, ISIL launched a counter-attack that managed to recapture two towns along the Euphrates and push back government troops back to Mayadin, but failed to recapture the T-2 Station.

On 5 November, government forces pushed within 15 kilometers of Abu Kamal, reaching the Iraqi border. After the Syrian Army met up with Iraqi militias on the border on 8 November, the Syrian military and its allies launched an assault on Abu Kamal, quickly encircling the city. The next day, pro-government forces captured Abu Kamal. However, late that day, an ISIL counterattack recapture large parts of the town. On 11 November, ISIL managed to fully recapture the city.

On 17 November, Syrian Army forces stormed the city again, capturing it by 19 November. After the loss of both Al-Qa'im and Abu Kamal, ISIL relocated its de facto capital to the Syrian city of Hajin.

=== Western bank of the Euphrates River ===
Fighting in the surrounding countryside of Abu Kamal continued until 28 November. Between 16 and 28 November 399 fighters on both sides were killed. During this time, government forces advanced along the western bank of the Euphrates, so to besiege a pocket of ISIL territory southeast of Mayadin. The pocket was surrounded on 21 November, and in the following days the Army slowly cleared it. By 28 November, the pocket was eliminated and the town of Al-Quriyah was captured.

The military then continued with its operations to link up forces advancing southeast of Mayadin with those at Abu Kamal. By 5 December, they were 10 kilometers from achieving this and on 6 December the link-up came, with the whole western bank of the Euphrates cleared after IS forces retreated to the western countryside of Deir ez-Zor. During the final push along the Euphrates, large numbers of ISIL suicide car bombers were sent against the advancing government forces, inflicting heavy casualties on the Army. ISIL suicide and ground attacks continued between 6 and 17 December, with 67 government fighters and 52 ISIL militants being killed. During this time, ISIL managed to recapture some territory, but on 17 December, government forces secured the whole western bank of the Euphrates once again after seizing the town of Al-Salihiyah, and besieging a large pocket of ISIL forces between the eastern Homs and western Deir ez-Zor Provinces, effectively ending the campaign.

== Aftermath – Continued ISIL attacks and operation to take the ISIL pocket ==
In early April 2018, ISIL forces in a pocket in the Homs Governorate employed an Inghimasi attack on the Shaer gas field near Palmyra. The battle lasted for several hours, with the attack eventually being repelled by the Syrian army with assistance of Russian attack helicopters.

On 23 May 2018, ISIL militants attacked a Syrian army base in Mayadeen in Deir Ezzor province. SOHR claimed that 35 pro-government forces killed, including at least nine Russians. According to Russian ministry of defence, at least four Russian soldiers and 43 attackers were killed during fighting.

On 20 June 2018, after a massive offensive by the Syrian Army, supported by Hezbollah and the Russian air force, which lasted several days, The Syrian Defence Ministry and the Syrian Army claimed that they and their allies had recaptured the entire ISIL pocket in the Homs-Deir ez-Zor region, recapturing 1,500 km^{2} of land and also killing at least 50 ISIL militants. However, these statements by the Syrian army appeared to be premature, as ISIL attacks from the Deir ez-Zor desert on Syrian Government positions around the Euphrates River continued during the entire summer, during which dozens of Syrian Army soldiers were killed; some estimates by the local observers are that up to 1,000 ISIL fighters were still hiding in the Homs-Deir ez-zor desert pocket. On 31 August, the Syrian Army and pro-government Palestinian militia Liwa al Quds launched a massive anti-terrorist operation in the Homs-Deir ez-Zor desert, with the objective to recapture the entire ISIL desert pocket; since ISIL fighters are located in the open desert terrain, without any natural defensive positions, they probably won't be able to hold their positions in the desert very long, because they are vulnerable to massive Syrian and Russian airstrikes. ISIL fell back far in the desert to try and escape the offensive. On 16 September 2018, ISIL yet again overran the SAA lines and re-entered most of the desert area, killing at least 25 government soldiers.

== See also ==
- Battle of Mosul (2016–2017)
- Raqqa campaign (2016–2017)
- Central Syria campaign (2017)
