= Galilee Forces =

Militia in the Syrian civil war

- قوات الجليل; Quwat al-Jalil
- Emblem of the Galilee Forces
- Leaders: Fadi al-Mellah (overall leader); Abu Ali Badran (deputy commander); Munir Abboud † (Badr Brigades commander)
- Dates active: 2012 – ?
- Group: Badr Brigades
- Active regions: Syria (formerly)
- Ideology: Palestinian nationalism
- Size: 4,800 (claimed)
- Part of: Movement of the Youth of the Palestinian Return
- Wars: Syrian Civil War

The Galilee Forces (Arabic: قوات الجليل, romanized: Quwat al-Jalil) is a majority-Palestinian militia formerly allied with the Ba'athist Syrian government during the Syrian Civil War. It serves as the armed wing of the Movement of the Youth of the Palestinian Return (Arabic: حركة شباب العودة الفلسطينية, romanized: Harakat Shabab al-Oudat al-Falastinia). The Galilee Forces have a sub-unit, the Badr Brigades, which was active in Aleppo.

During the Syrian Civil War the group worked to recruit from the Khan Dannun camp and other Palestinian refugee camps controlled by Ba'athist Syria.

The group claimed responsibility for a IED explosion that occurred on the Megiddo junction in March 13, 2023. In February 2024 the group released a video in which they threatened to kill Israeli PM Benjamin Netanyahu, Minister of National Security Itamar Ben-Gvir, and MK Zvi Sukkot.

After the fall of the Assad regime in late 2024, the Syrian transitional government demanded that all Palestinian armed groups in Syria disarm themselves, dissolve their military formations, and instead focus on political and charitable work.

== See also ==
- List of armed groups in the Syrian Civil War
