= Siege of Deir ez-Zor (2014–2017) =

Siege in the Syrian Civil War

- Part of the Deir ez-Zor Governorate campaign of the Syrian civil war
- Top: Syrian Republican Guard T-72 tank in Deir ez-Zor; Bottom: The military situation in central Syria and around Deir ez-Zor on 30 June 2017, before the siege was broken
Date	14 July 2014 – 17 November 2017 (3 years, 4 months and 3 days)
Location	Deir ez-Zor, Deir ez-Zor Governorate, Syria
Result	Syrian government victory
Territorial changes	IS besieges Syrian government forces in July 2014 (after expelling Syrian rebel forces from the province); IS military forces split the government-held Deir ez-Zor pocket in January 2017; Syrian government forces reach the Brigade 137 base, thus meeting with besieged Syrian Arab Army forces, and lifting the IS siege of the city; Siege of the government-held airbase ends on 9 September 2017, with all surrounding points recaptured by 10 September; Syrian government forces captures IS-held parts of the city on 17 November

Belligerents
(Syria) Syrian Government; Hezbollah; Liwa Zainebiyoun; PMF-affiliated militias Russia (Sep 2015 – Nov 2017)	Islamic State

Commanders and leaders
Issam Zahreddine † (Republican Guard); Yarob Zahreddine (104th Airborne Brigade); Hassan Mohammad (17th Division; since July 2016); Mohamed Khaddor (17th Division; until July 2016 & returned Jan. 2017); Omar al-Alawi (WIA) (Head of Deir ez-Zor NDF); Mudar Makhlouf (Military Intelligence militia commander); Daas Hassan Ali (Deir ez-Zor State Security Director); Sergei Surovikin (Russian forces commander) (Russia) Valery Asapov † (Syrian 5th Corps commander)	Gulmurod Khalimov † (ISIL war minister) (Emir of Deir ez-Zor) (Islamic State) Abu Khadijah al-Masri † (ISIL Governor of Deir ez-Zor) (Islamic State) Amer al-Rafdan † (ISIL leader of Deir ez-Zor) (Islamic State) Abu Hamza al-Ansari † (ISIL Deir ez-Zor emir) (Islamic State) Abu al Faruq † (ISIL Deir ez-Zor commander) (Islamic State) Abu Jandal al-Kuwaiti † (ISIL top commander) (Islamic State) Abu Hadhefah al-Maghrabi † (ISIL field commander)

Units involved
Syrian Armed Forces; Syrian Arab Army; Republican Guard; 104th Airborne Brigade; Qalamoun Shield auxiliaries (Note: The Qalamoun Shield Forces in Deir ez-Zor were eventually fully incorporated into the Republican Guard's 104th Brigade.); 17th Reserve Division; 137th Mechanized Brigade; Syrian Arab Air Force; National Defense Forces (Deir ez-Zor branch); Arab Socialist Movement forces; Loyalist tribal militias; Local Defence Forces; Qamr Bani Hashim Division; Military Intelligence Directorate; Military Security Shield Forces; Forces of the Fighters of the Tribes; Sootoro: Russian Armed Forces (since Oct. 2015); Russian Air Force; Russian Navy; Special Operations Forces	Military of the Islamic State; Wilayat al-Khayr

Strength
4,000–5,000 (besieged, pro-gov. claim); 10,000–15,000 (Relief force, Syrian Army claim)	5,000–15,000 (Syrian Army claim)

Casualties and losses
460–970+ killed	1,430–1,970+ killed
- 329–500+ civilians killed, ~400 kidnapped

The siege of Deir ez-Zor was a large-scale siege imposed by the Islamic State (IS) militant group against several districts in the city of Deir ez-Zor held by the Syrian government's military forces, in an attempt to capture the city and secure full control of the Deir ez-Zor Governorate. The ISIL siege of the city lasted for almost 3 years and 2 months, after which the Syrian Army launched a successful offensive that fully recaptured the city nine weeks later.

In April 2014, IS launched a large-scale offensive against Syrian rebel forces in Deir ez-Zor governorate. This resulted in the total defeat of rebel groups in Deir ez-Zor governorate, and IS gained control of almost all of Deir ez-Zor Governorate by July 2014. Syrian government forces remained besieged in the pocket of territory they continued to control. On 10 September 2017, the siege was fully broken by Syrian government forces. After another two months of fighting, the Syrian Arab Army captured the IS-held parts of Deir ez-Zor city and its environs, by 17 November 2017.

== Background ==
Since the end of 2013, rebel forces surrounded Deir ez-Zor and captured half of the city and almost the entire province. ISIL became increasingly involved in the battle. The following rebel infighting in and near the city resulted in ISIL retreating from Deir ez-Zor in February 2014.

In April 2014, following their defeat at the hands of the rebels, ISIL returned and launched a large-scale offensive against the Syrian rebel groups in the Deir ez-Zor Province, expelling them from the area, and allowing ISIL to gain control of most of the Deir ez-Zor Governorate and besiege the remaining Syrian Government forces, in July 2014.

== The siege ==
=== 2014: Offensives and counter-offensives ===
Map showing the beginning of the siege, July 2014

From early to mid-September 2014, ISIL made several unsuccessful attempts to breach the Deir ez-Zor military air base. During the fighting on 15 September 2014, the Siasiyya Bridge that links the rural countryside and the city was destroyed. It was unclear who destroyed it.

In late October 2014, the Army launched an offensive on the Sakr Island and within days made several advances, capturing 90 percent of the island, with ISIL forces left in control of only its northern part. One month later, the Army resumed its offensive on the island.

In early December 2014, ISIL launched an offensive in the direction of the Deir ez-Zor military air base. During three days of fighting, 68–200 militants and 43–51 soldiers were reported killed. Despite ISIL managing to penetrate the air base, as well as seize the mountain overlooking the city and two nearby villages, the Army eventually pushed ISIL's forces back and repelled the offensive.

=== 2015: The siege continues ===
On 5 January 2015, ISIL closed all roads, and cut all optical fiber cables and other electric wires and cables leading to government-held districts of Deir ez-Zor.

By May 2015, fierce back-and-forth fighting raged in the city, with the Syrian Army and ISIL launching a series of attacks and counterattacks against each other. Early that month, ISIL forces captured Sakr Island. Two weeks later, the Syrian Army claimed that it was able to recapture most of it. However, it was confirmed that the island was still under ISIL control. At this point, due to ISIL's capture of the city of Palmyra, rumors started circulating that Syrian Government forces were preparing to abandon and surrender the city of Deir ez-Zor to ISIL.

In September 2015, ISIL started regularly to shell the airbase, severing the air bridge that had supplied the city with food and other goods.

In early November 2015, a new ISIL attack on the airbase was repelled.

=== 2016: ISIL advances ===
On 16 January 2016, ISIL launched an offensive on Deir ez-Zor. Several assaults were conducted during the day, which included six ISIL suicide bombers in attempts to break into military positions. After a few days of heavy fighting, ISIL overran the Baghiliya and Ayyash neighborhoods, after which pro-government fighters and their families were among those targeted in the seized areas. The Syrian government and state media said that 250–300 people were killed, including some by beheading; the British-based SOHR had differing numbers, reporting 135 fatalities, of which 85 were civilians and 50 soldiers. ISIL also captured an Army weapons depot and seized tanks. SOHR added that ISIL kidnapped about 400 civilians from families of pro-government fighters. Subsequently, ISIL forces captured areas south and west of Baghiliya. Overall, according to SOHR, about 440 people were killed in the five-day ISIL offensive, including: 200 soldiers, 110 ISIL fighters and 127 civilians. 30 of the ISIL militants were suicide-bombers, while 85 civilians and 48 soldiers were executed by ISIL. 42 civilians died in government air-strikes and shelling.

In mid-March 2016, the Army launched an attack toward the Thayyem Oil Fields, south of Deir ez-Zor. On the first day of their assault, government forces said they had captured Tharda Mountain. After four days of fighting, the government said it had managed to capture the oil fields.

Between April and May 2016, back-and-forth fighting took place as ISIL attempted to advance against government troops in the Industrial and al-Sina'ah districts of Deir ez-Zor city. The Army said that it eventually managed to retain its positions.

In June 2016, Hezbollah sent elite reinforcements to help protect the provincial capital of Deir ez-Zor. Later on the same month, the Thayyem Oil Fields were once again under ISIL control and the militants were positioned alongside the government-held Tharda Mountain. Late that month, a two-day long ISIL attack on the mountain was repelled, according to pro-government sources. In July 2016, pro-government sources said that heavy Russian air-strikes against ISIL managed to relieve the pressure on Syrian Army troops stationed on the mountain.

On 17 September 2016, a series of 37 U.S.-led Coalition airstrikes near the Deir ez-Zor Airport, lasting from 3:55 to 4:56 p.m. (Damascus time), killed 90 Syrian Army soldiers and wounded 110 more. The attack triggered "a diplomatic firestorm" with Russia calling a (then rare) emergency United Nations Security Council meeting as well as leading to the Syrian government calling off a nationwide ceasefire that had been the result of months of intense diplomatic efforts by the U.S. and Russian governments. The Syrian Army positions that were struck were on the Tharda Mountain and at a nearby artillery base. The airstrikes led to ISIL capturing the Tharda Mountain. Initially, the US Armed Forces did not outright admit that Coalition planes hit Syrian troops, but later the Coalition admitted their planes and drones carried out the attack. The US stated that they halted the strikes as soon as they became aware of the Syrian Army's presence and regretted the unintentional loss of life.

=== 2017: New assaults on besieged areas ===
In mid-January 2017, a new ISIL offensive was launched with the aim to cut the road between Deir ez-Zor Airport and the city. After two days of fighting, ISIL succeeded in cutting the road linking the air base to the city, leaving the government enclave split in two. During their advances, ISIL captured multiple positions, including the Sakan al-Jahiziya neighborhood on the highway between the city and Damascus, and a strategic mountain overlooking the city. Back-and-forth fighting continued for one month with the Army unsuccessfully attempting to reopen the supply line between the airport and the city. The clashes left more than 470 dead, including: 241 ISIL militants, 127 soldiers and 105 civilians.

As the siege of Deir ez-Zor intensified, fears rose that ISIL would commit a large massacre if it ever captured the city. ISIL attempts to breach the Army defenses of the Deir ez-Zor Airport continued well into March 2017. Also, late that month, ISIL conducted a tank assault on the government-held Al-Fourat university, located on the N7 Highway leading to the provincial capital. The same day, ISIL seized a large amount of ammunition and weapons that was intended for the Syrian Army but miss-dropped into ISIL territory by the Russian Air Force.

In early April, the Syrian Army made multiple attempts to reopen the supply line between the city and the airport. The fighting was primarily concentrated on the Cemetery Area. Towards the end of May, Army forces were still staving off attacks by ISIL fighters, while 100,000 civilians were surrounded and living without adequate food, services or safety. The UN's World Food Programme, in conjunction with the Syrian government and the Syrian Arab Red Crescent, regularly airdropped food and aid to the encircled pockets. Frequent fighting was also taking place in the Cemetery Area.

On 3 June, ISIL advanced near Deir ez-Zor. Heavy fighting continued the next day for control of two hilltops at the southern entrance to the city. On 5 June, ISIL managed to capture one of the hills, but were forced to withdraw due to heavy airstrikes. Later that night, a new ISIL attack against the Panorama roundabout was launched that was preceded by a suicide car-bomber. ISIL managed to capture several checkpoints near the roundabout, forcing Army units to withdraw to their second line of defense. ISIL attacks against the two hills also continued, but without any gains. The following evening, ISIL made another push but were repelled. Between 9 and 13 June, ISIL conducted waves of attacks on a daily basis, which were ultimately all repelled.

Between 7 and 11 July, a new series of ISIL attacks on Syrian Army positions around the city were repelled. One week later, Syrian Army troops themselves conducted attacks against ISIL positions. At the end of the month, another ISIL attack on Army positions was repelled. At the start of August, after managing to capture a 280-meter long ditch, the Army managed to impose fire-control over ISIL's supply line leading from Tharda Mountain through the Cemetery Area into ISIL-held suburbs of the city. This was followed by several new unsuccessful attempts by ISIL to breach Army lines between 6 and 12 August.

=== Summer 2017: Breaking the siege ===
During May and June 2017, the Syrian Arab Army established control over most of the southern part of Raqqa province, as well as the Eastern Qalamoun Mountains. In mid-July, Syrian forces launched a campaign in Central Syria targeting ISIL strongholds in the provinces of Homs and Hama. On 27 August, the Army launched a major offensive along the Sukhnah-Deir ez-Zor highway. The next day, the Army, with the help of Russian air strikes, came within 66 kilometers of the surrounded city. In the morning of 29 August, the Syrian forces launched a surprise attack in the western part of Deir ez-Zor, targeting ISIL's positions in the strategic Panorama area. On 31 August, the Syrian Arab Army established full control over the strategic mountain of Bishiri, west of Deir ez-Zor city. The offensive was accompanied by Russian air strikes on ISIL positions. Syrian and Russian aviation carried out a joint air attack on an ISIL command center in the al-Rashdiyah district of Deir ez-Zor. By 31 August, the Syrian Army, headed by elite Tiger Forces, had advanced to within 50 kilometers of Deir ez-Zor from Sukhna in the east.

During the first days of September 2017, the Syrian Army and its allies had reached the 137th Brigade base and were battling to reach the troops besieged inside. It was later reported that they had come within 3 kilometres (1.9 mi) of reaching the nearest Army positions around the base. The siege was broken on 5 September 2017, at around 14:00 local time, when government forces met with elements of the 137th Brigade. The Deir ez-Zor airport continued to be besieged until it was relieved four days later, on 9 September.

The breaking of the ISIL siege of the city was met with scenes of celebration as civilians exchanged congratulations and fired celebratory gunshots into the air. According to one resident, people would "prefer the government over Daesh" in the hopes that breaking of the siege could mean the gradual return of life to Deir ez-Zor, and along with it basic supplies.

== Aftermath – Battle for Deir ez-Zor city ==
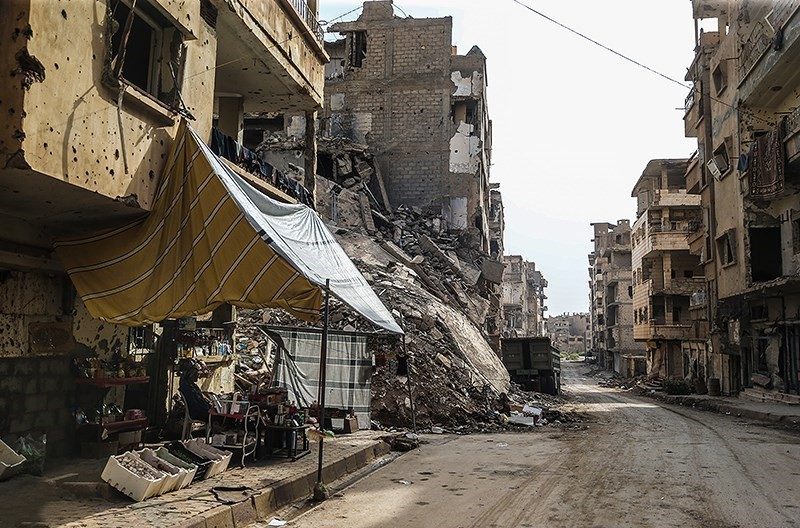

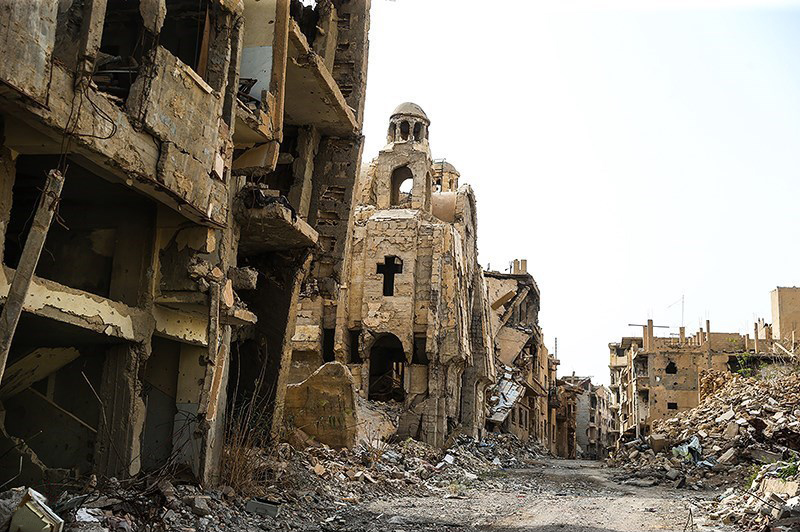
The destroyed city of Deir Ez-Zor in 2018

On 14 September 2017, the Syrian Army launched an offensive to recapture the remaining ISIL-held districts of Deir ez-Zor city, reportedly capturing the district of Al-Baghiliyah. On 17 October, the Syrian Army said it had secured a perimeter surrounding the ISIL-controlled half of the city, encircling the remaining ISIL forces in eastern Deir ez-Zor. Subsequently, the Syrian Army launched an operation to recapture the entire city from ISIL. On 3 November 2017, the Syrian Army fully recaptured Deir ez-Zor city and its surroundings from ISIL. On 17 November, Syrian Government forces captured Hawijat Kati Island, to the north of Deir ez-Zor city, fully bringing the rest of Deir ez-Zor and its outskirts under their control.

== Impact on civilians ==
During the siege, ISIL cut off the power supply to the city. In February 2016, around 200,000 people resided in Deir ez-Zor. The siege resulted in widespread malnutrition and starvation of the civilians in the city. In response, the United Nations' World Food Programme has conducted 177 airdrops of food and other humanitarian aid to the besieged districts of the city since April 2016. 110,000–120,000 civilians remained as of January 2017, when an ISIL offensive on the airport forced the airdrops to be suspended. In November 2017, the UN estimated that at the start of the siege, around 200,000 civilians were besieged in the Syrian Government-held districts of Deir ez-Zor, which decreased to 90,000 near the end of the siege, with most of those civilians escaping or being smuggled out of the city during ISIL's siege.

As a result of the cut in electricity, only one electric generator-powered water pump was available, and the water was not treated. The Syrian Arab Red Crescent has installed several water tanks in response.

Between February 2015 and March 2016, more than 63 civilians were killed by ISIL bombardment on government-held neighbourhoods in Deir ez-Zor, in addition to 32 civilians who died of malnutrition and related diseases. Human rights violations have been documented by investigative journalists including Rukaia Al-abadi.

== See also ==
- Battle of Damascus (2012)
- Battle of Aleppo (2012–2016)
- Siege of Nubl and al-Zahraa
- Deir ez-Zor clashes
- 2014 Eastern Syria offensive
- Siege of al-Fu'ah and Kafriya
- Palmyra offensive (May 2015)
- Palmyra offensive (March 2016)
- Palmyra offensive (December 2016)
- Palmyra offensive (2017)
- Siege of Kobanî
- Raqqa campaign (2016–2017)
