= 17th Division (Syria) =

17th Reserve Division
- الفرقة الاحتياطية 17
- Divisional tactical color marking
- Active: 1970 – 2024
- Country: Ba'athist Syria (surrendered)
- Allegiance: Syrian Arab Armed Forces (surrendered)
- Branch: Syrian Army
- Role: Mechanized Infantry
- Size: ~ 8,500 soldiers (2018)
- Part of: 3rd Corps
- Garrison/HQ: Deir ez-Zor; Ayn Issa (93rd Brigade); Qamishli (54th Regiment); Hasakah (123rd Regiment)
- Engagements: Syrian Civil War; Deir ez-Zor clashes; Battle of Raqqa; Battle of Aleppo; Battle of Idlib; 2013 Hama offensive; Battle of Mork; Idlib Governorate clashes (2014); 2014 Eastern Syria offensive; Euphrates Crossing offensive (2017); Deir ez-Zor offensive (September–November 2017); Syrian Desert campaign (December 2017–present)

Commanders
- Commander: Maj. Gen. Jihad Yusuf
- Notable commanders: Maj. Gen. Nidal Saleh Dalila; Maj. Gen. Nizar Khaddour; Maj. Gen. Hassan Muhammad; Maj. Gen. Mohammad Khaddour

The 17th Reserve Division (Arabic: الفرقة الاحتياطية 17) was a formation of the Syrian Army responsible for north-eastern Syria. It was one of two autonomous reserve divisions of the Syrian Arab Army, the other being the 18th Armoured Division. The 17th Division was part of the 3rd Corps.

== Command structure ==
As of 2019, the Division was an autonomous unit of the Syrian Army. It was one of the Syrian Army's two specialized divisions, which unlike the Army's conventional divisions included both brigades and maneuver regiments.

The 17th Division was part of the 3rd Corps structure, and was composed of 137th Mechanized Brigade, the 93rd Armored Brigade, the 121st and 123rd Artillery Regiments. Later reports stated that two battalions from the 54th Special Forces Regiment served within the 17th Division.

=== Order of Battle ===
17th Reserve Division (2021)

- 137th Mechanized Brigade
- 93rd Armored Brigade
- 54th Special Forces Regiment
- 121st Artillery Regiment
- 123rd Artillery Regiment

== Combat history ==
=== Role in the civil war ===
The 17th Reserve Division was active in Deir ez-Zor province throughout 2012.

The division's 93rd Brigade left Idlib to secure Raqqa Governorate in early 2012.

In November 2012 the Free Syrian Army claimed that elements of the 17th Division were in Rastan, thereby raising the possibility that elements of the Division withdrew from the east as the Syrian Government lost positions there.

Following the reported capture of Raqqa on 3–6 March 2013, elements of the 17th Division remained under siege to the north of the city in March 2013.

Following the fall of the Menagh airbase, the remaining troops of the defeated 17th Division sought refuge with Kurdish forces in Afrin. The Kurds, however, turned over the senior officers to al-Nusra in exchange for Kurdish prisoners held by al-Nusra and the al-Nusra militants promptly killed the handed over officers, including Colonel Naji Abu Shaar.

In July 2014, ISIS captured the division's and 93rd's Brigade headquarters in the 2014 Eastern Syria offensive.

In February 2016, the 137th Brigade was reported to be controlling airdropped UN aid supplies in Deir ez-Zor city which was under siege by ISIS forces.

On 15 October 2016, the 137th Brigade attacked the southern outskirts of their former HQ that was occupied by ISIS in Deir ez-Zor. They killed several ISIS militants and destroyed three armored vehicles.

In June 2017, the Syrian Democratic Forces and other allied forces, aided by US airstrikes, captured the main base/headquarters of the division, located in the outskirts of Raqqa from ISIS after clashes between the two forces occurred as part of the Battle of Raqqa.

As of 2022, Major General Nidal Dalila, who hailed from the Republican Guard, was the commander of the 17th Reserve Division and Deir ez-Zor Security & Military Committee.
