= Syrian Republican Guard =

Elite branch of Syria's military

Coordinates: 33.5492°N 36.2587°E

- الحرس الجمهوري السوري
- Active: 1976–present
- Country: Syria
- Allegiance: Syria (2025–present); President of Syria
- Branch: Syrian Army
- Type: 2025–present Infantry; Security unit 1976–2024; Security unit Mechanized infantry Special operations force
- Role: 2025–present Guard of honour Security; 1976–2024; Shock troops Airborne forces Armoured warfare Urban warfare
- Size: Unknown as of 2026
- Garrison/HQ: Mount Qasioun, Damascus
- Color: Black
- Engagements: Syrian Civil War; Rif Dimashq Governorate campaign; Battle of Damascus; Siege of Homs; Deir ez-Zor clashes (2011–2014); Battle of Aleppo (2012–2016); Qalamoun offensive (2014); Siege of Deir ez-Zor (2014–2017); Deir ez-Zor offensive (December 2014); Battle of al-Hasakah (2015); Rif Dimashq offensive (September 2015); Palmyra offensive (March 2016); East Hama offensive (2017); Deir ez-Zor offensive (September–November 2017); Eastern Syria campaign (September–December 2017); Battle of Harasta (2017–2018); Rif Dimashq offensive (February–April 2018); Southern Damascus offensive (April–May 2018); Northwestern Syria offensive (April–August 2019); Northwestern Syria offensive (December 2019–March 2020); Northwestern Syria clashes (December 2022–November 2024); Battle of Aleppo (2024)

Commanders
- Current Commander: Abdul Rahman al Khatib
- Deputy Commander: Brig. Gen. Mohamed Qasem
- Chief of Staff: Brig. Gen. Hussein Smia
- 30th Division Commander: Maj. Gen. Mohamad Saftly
- Brigade Commanders: Brig. Gen. Kamal Itiya (101st Brigade); Brig. Gen. Mundir Ibrahim (103rd Brigade); Col. Assad Omran (104th Brigade); Brig. Gen. Aqil Jumaa (106th Brigade)
- Notable commanders: Maj. Gen. Ghassan Iskandar Tarraf; Maj. Gen. Adnan Makhlouf; Maj. Gen. Talal Makhlouf; Maj. Gen. Issam Zahreddine †; Maj. Gen. Malik Aliaa; Maj. Gen. Shoaeb Suleiman; Brig. Gen. Ali Khuzam †; Col. Nizar Mahmoud †

Insignia
- Flag

The Syrian Republican Guard (SRG) (Note: Arabic: الحرس الجمهوري السوري, romanized: al-Ḥaras al-Jumhūrīy as-Sūrīy), also known as the Presidential Guard, is the primary security unit in the Syrian Army. Prior to the fall of the Assad regime, it reportedly consisted of 60,000 guardsmen. It was composed of two mechanized divisions with its main purpose to protect the capital of Syria, Damascus, from any foreign or domestic threats. The Republican Guard was also the only Syrian military unit allowed within the capital prior to the civil war.

The SRG was primarily used to protect the President as well as major government buildings in the capital, including the presidential palace.

== History ==
The Guard was formed in 1976 after the Syrian invasion of Lebanon, during the Lebanese Civil War, to protect the then Syrian president Hafez al-Assad. Major General Adnan Makhlouf commanded the Guard from 1976 until 1997. The Republican Guard was used mostly to protect top Syrian government officials from any external threats and to serve as a counter-weight to the other powerful Syrian Arab Army formations near the capital, the 4th Mechanized Division, the 3rd Armoured Division, and the 14th Special Forces (Airborne) Division. Many members of the Assad family have served in the Republican Guard. The former president Bashar al-Assad was a Colonel, and was given control of a brigade. His younger brother Maher was also a Colonel in the Republican Guard.

=== Syrian Civil War ===
==== Under the Ba'athist regime ====
At the beginning of the Syrian civil war, the Republican Guard kept out of the conflict, with only the regular Syrian Armed Forces fighting. In June 2012, the Republican Guard clashed with rebels near its housing compounds and bases in the suburbs of Qudsaya and al-Hamah, about 8 kilometers from central Damascus.

The unit had been accused by Human Rights Watch of engaging in human rights abuses during the conflict. In 2012, Republican guard units played an important role in repelling opposition offensives on Damascus and Aleppo. Later in 2012, Republican Guard units were deployed to government bases in the North and East of the country, in order to bolster and stiffen the resistance against rebel advances. 400 Syrian Republican Guard fighters were reportedly called in as reinforcements during the Battle of Al-Hasakah.

The 103rd Brigade reportedly operated in the Latakia province where (in 2013) it assisted other pro-government units in stopping opposition assaults on the Alawite heartland during 2013 Latakia offensive. The brigade also reportedly participated in offensive operations which partially expelled rebels from the Latakia province.

The 124th brigade reportedly participated in the successful defense of IS attacks on the Tabqa airbase in 2014, before the evacuation of the airport. The brigade reportedly defended the Ithriya-Khanasser highway thus preserving a major supply line to Aleppo. The brigade was reported in January 2018 directing the capture of the al-Hass Plain and the Offensive towards Abu-Duhur from the north (front of south Aleppo)

The 104th brigade was well known in the media due to its multi-year deployment against ISIL in Deir ez-Zor. Deployed to the area in late 2012, according to some sources (other sources state that the brigade was not deployed to Deir ez-Zor before early 2014), the brigade, along with other SAA elements, defended pro-government-held territory in Deir ez-Zor. The brigade was largely under siege from January 2015, supported from the air by the Syrian Arab Air Force and Russian Air Force. The brigade in Deir ez-Zor city continued to be besieged until it was relieved on 5 September 2017. In early 2018 reports emerged that the unit was transferred back to Damascus.

In 2016, elements of the 102nd, 106th Brigades and the 800th Regiment were reported to have taken part in the successful Aleppo campaign which expelled opposition elements from the city.

In late 2016 and early 2017, together with other pro-government units, the 800th Regiment was reported to have stopped an ISIL offensive by defending the T4 airbase and preventing a possible ISIL assault on Homs.

105th Brigade was largely employed in Damascus and the surrounding areas, mainly focusing on the East Ghouta front which has been an opposition stronghold for years, reportedly containing 25,000 opposition fighters.

In 2017, following several deployments to the Aleppo front the 106th brigade reportedly returned to the Damascus operating area where it continued combat operations.

On October 18, 2017, Issam Zahreddine, a Major General leading the Syrian government's fight against ISIL in Deir ez-Zor and known as "Lion of the Republican Guard," was killed when a land mine struck his vehicle in the Hwaijet Saqer area of Deir ez-Zor's countryside during a military operation.

In March 2021, its commander since January 2021, Major General Malik Aliaa (formerly commander of the Republican Guard's 30th Division) was sanctioned by the United Kingdom, which named him as "Responsible for the violent repression of the civilian population by troops under his command, particularly during the increased violence of the offensives in north-west Syria of 2019–2020."

==== Fall of the Ba'athist regime ====
In the 2024 Syrian opposition offensives, the Syrian Armed Forces quickly collapsed across Syria. The Republican Guard was one of the few military units which were still regarded as reliable at the time. As a result, the Republican Guard was one of the units sent to defend Aleppo, but they only managed to hold some of the city's most strategic locations for a limited time. When rebel groups later advanced into Damascus, the Republican Guard offered no resistance, while the Assad regime crumbled.

==== Post-Ba'athist regime ====
On 11 February 2025, the Syrian Defense Ministry, under the Syrian transitional government, appointed Hay'at Tahrir al-Sham (HTS) Shura Council member Brigadier General Abdul Rahman al-Khatib as commander of the Republican Guard in Damascus.

However, according to The Syrian Observer, al-Khatib had ties to Jabhat al-Nusra and other groups with "extreme ideologies."

== Structure ==
Emblem of the Republican Guard during Ba'athist rule.

At the outset of the Syrian civil war, the Republican Guard included three mechanized brigades and two "security regiments." The unit had similar organization like other Republican guard type formations. The overall force structure was comparable to a two conventional mechanized infantry divisions, but like the 4th Armored Division, the Republican Guard was outfitted with better equipment and maintained at full strength.

The main ground combat unit of the Syrian military was often called a brigade or regiment and was between 500 and 1,000 strong. This was considerably smaller than a corresponding Western formation of that designation. For reasons of esprit de corps, these retained their pre-civil war titles as tank, infantry, mechanized, artillery, special forces and airborne Republican Guard brigades or regiments. During the civil war, their internal organization was very different from their pre-civil war structure.

=== Structure (2021) ===
In the last days of October 2017, Jane's Information Group published in its Jane's Intelligence Review an article on the current military situation of the Syrian Arab Army and its future challenges. The text reflects the transformation that the battle order has presented through the conflict, from the old order of battle of the Soviet influence to the current one, more adapted to the new challenges.

Between 2017 and 2021, Syrian Republican Guard's battle order was partially changed and new units were created. The Syrian Marines were dissolved in 2017. The Popular Security and Support Forces were dissolved in 2019.

As of October 2021, according to Gregory Waters, Republican Guard operates nine brigades, two mechanized regiments, two armored regiments, five special forces regiments and three artillery regiments:

Republican Guard (2021)

- 100th Artillery Regiment

Equipped with 122 mm howitzer 2A18 (D-30), 2S1 Gvozdika, 2S3 Akatsiya howitzers and BM-21 Grad rocket launchers.

- 101st and 102nd Infantry "Security" Regiments

Their task is to provide security to the President, government ministers, senior government officials and the Army headquarters and other government institutions.

- 103rd Commando Brigade
- 104th Airborne Brigade
- 105th Mechanized Brigade
- 107th Artillery Regiment (created in 2021)
- 108th Armored Regiment (created in 2021)
- 109th Armored Regiment (created in 2021)
- 151st Mechanized Regiment (created in 2021)
- 152nd Mechanized Regiment (created in 2021)
- 800th Regiment
- 30th Division
  - 102nd Commando Brigade
  - 106th Mechanized Brigade
  - 123rd Special Forces Brigade
  - 124th Special Forces Brigade
  - 135th Mechanized Brigade
  - 47th Special Forces Regiment
  - 93rd Special Forces Regiment
  - 147th Special Forces Regiment
  - Artillery Regiment

Other special units:

- Lionesses of Defense Armored Brigade

== Uniform and insignia ==
The Republican Guard uniform was distinct from the regular Army uniform. Service dress consisted of woodland camouflage worn with red berets, rather than the standard black or green, red epaulettes, red lanyards, and brown leather belts with green camouflaged shoes. On ceremonial occasions, officers wore red peaked caps instead of a beret. Commandos of the Guard could easily be discerned from other units by their 'القوات الخاصة – "Commandos" patch, but were only rarely seen wearing their red beret.

== Equipment ==
=== Post-Ba'athist Syria ===
==== Small arms ====
Since the fall of the Ba'athist regime, the status of the equipment used by the Republican Guard are currently unknown; however, during President Ahmed al-Sharaa's visit to Aleppo, his security detail, possibly part of the Republican Guard, were seen equipped with the AKS-74U carbine, and during his visit to Deir ez-Zor Governorate and Aleppo, his security detail were seen equipped with the Kale KCR assault rifle.

==== Vehicles ====
The Syrian Republican Guard under the Syrian transitional government operates several Chevrolet Suburbans alongside several Toyota Land Cruisers.

=== Ba'athist Syria ===
Prior to the fall of the Ba'athist-led regime, The Republican Guard tended to usually be better equipped than the standard Syrian Army. The Republican Guard had been documented and photographed using the American-made M-16 rifle, the Soviet made AKMS, the AK-74, and its AKS-74U Carbine variant alongside the AK-100 series which both are chambered for 5.45×39mm. The AK-74M rifles were believed to have entered Syria in the mid to late 1990s following a weapons sale deal with Russia. The AK-74M was also sometimes seen with an NSPU night vision optic sight or a GP-25 grenade launcher in some cases.

Members of the Republican Guard had also been seen with the Glock handgun alongside the Makarov PM 9×18mm pistol in their holsters. Maher al-Assad, who was in the Republican Guard as a Commander and also is the brother of former President Bashar al-Assad, was seen with a Springfield Armory XD pistol in his holster while visiting troops.

The NSV machine gun chambered for 12.7×108mm had also been used by the Republican Guard during the civil war and was usually seen being used whilst the guard members were in a building firing at rebels. The PKM machine gun chambered in 7.62×54mmR was also used by the Republican Guard.

Armored units of the Guard were equipped with T-55, T-62, T-72 (T-72 Adra) and more modern T-90s. Some T-55s were upgraded with locally developed Viper thermal imager. All tanks were upgraded with soft-kill Sarab Active Protection System. The main IFVs of the SRG were the BMP-1 and the BMP-2. Since 2015, Russia was upgrading SRG with the modern APCs such as BTR-80, BTR-82A, GAZ-2975 Tigr, BMPT-72 Terminator 2 and GAZ-39371 Vodnik, etc.

== See also ==
- Iraqi Republican Guard
- Egyptian Republican Guard
