= Issam Zahreddine =

Major General of the Syrian Republican Guard

- عصام زهر الدين
- Republican Guard General Issam Zahreddine
- Born: 9 September 1961; Tarba, As-Suwayda, United Arab Republic (present-day Syria)
- Died: 18 October 2017 (aged 56); Hawijat Saqr, Deir ez-Zor, Syria
- Burial place: As-Suwayda
- Military career
- Allegiance: Ba'athist Syria
- Branch: Syrian Arab Army
- Service years: 1980–2017
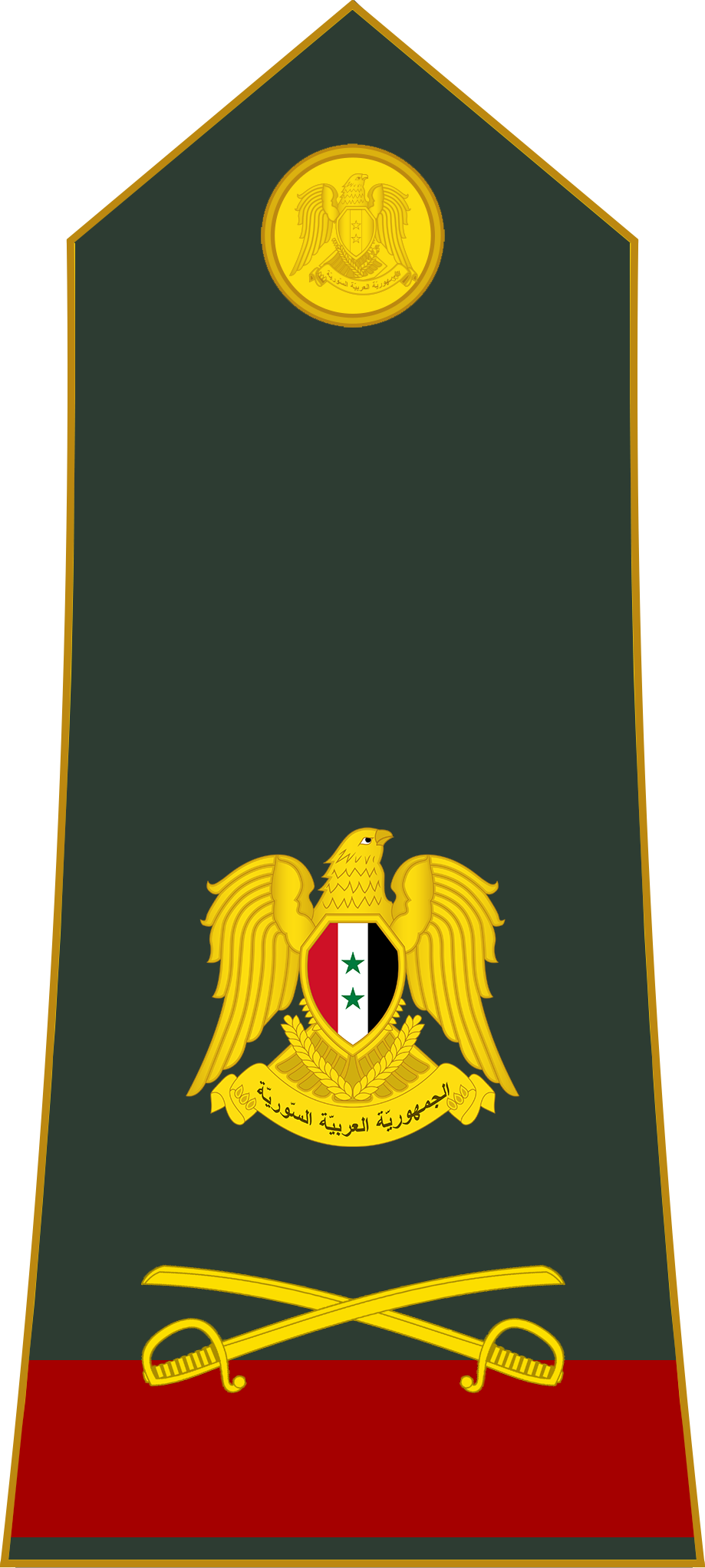
- Rank: Major General
- Nickname: "Lion of the Republican Guard"
- Unit: Republican Guard
- Commands: Republican Guard's 104th Brigade; Commander of SAA troops in Aleppo (July – October 2013); Commander of Republican Guards in Deir ez-Zor (October 2013 – October 2017)
- Conflicts: Islamist uprising in Syria; Syrian Civil War; 2012 Homs offensive; Rif Dimashq offensive (November 2012–February 2013); Damascus offensive; Rif Dimashq offensive (March–August 2013); Battle of Aleppo (2012–2016); Deir ez-Zor clashes (2011–2014); Battle of Al-Hasakah (June–August 2015); Siege of Deir ez-Zor (2014–2017) †

Issam Jad'aan Zahreddine (Arabic: عِصَام جَدْعَان زَهْر الدِّين, romanized: ʿIṣām Jadʿān Zahr ad-Dīn, 9 September 1961 – 18 October 2017; also transliterated as Zaher Eldin or Zaher al-Deen) was a Syrian military officer and former commander of the Syrian Republican Guard. He played a major role in the Syrian Civil War, leading Syrian government forces on several fronts. His most prominent role was the leadership of the surrounded Syrian forces during the over three-year long siege of Deir ez-Zor by ISIS. On 18 October 2017, Zahreddine was killed by a land mine explosion during operations against the Islamic State on Saqr island in Deir ez-Zor.

== Background ==
Zahreddine was born in the small rural village of Tarba in the As-Suwayda Governorate in 1961. A member of the Druze religious community, he was commissioned as an officer in the Airborne (Special Forces) Armoured units in 1982. Before that he served in the Baath Party's People's Militia (Popular Militia) as a conscript from 1980 to 1982. In 1987, he was inducted into the Republican Guard as an Armoured and Mechanized Units' officer.

== Syrian civil war ==
Zahreddine commanded the Republican Guard's 104th Brigade in Douma and Harasta alongside Brigadier General Manaf Tlass before the latter's defection. This brigade was led by Bashar al-Assad before he became president, and by Bassel al-Assad until his death in 1994. According to testimony from a defector to Human Rights Watch, Zahreddine ordered the systematic beating of arrested protestors in Douma during the civil uprising phase of the Syrian Civil War; for these alleged actions, he became known as the "Druze Beast" among the Syrian opposition.

As the Syrian Civil War escalated, Zahreddine became one of the most prominent and high-ranking members of the Druze community in Syria fighting for the government. As result, he has been widely criticized by pro-opposition and anti-war Druze: The leader of the Lebanese Druze, Walid Jumblatt, accused him of "fighting against his own people", and Zahreddine was also singled out by a group of Druze religious leaders meeting in As-Suwayda in February 2013 as an individual deserving of death, in a statement otherwise decrying the use of violence by both sides. Among pro-Assad Druze in Syria including the Golan Heights, however, he was regarded as a "hero" and had many followers.

Zahreddine was sent in early 2012 to Homs where the SAA offensive against rebel groups was culminating in the siege and Battle of Baba Amr, in which his troops surrounded the neighbourhood, blocked supply routes and shelled it. Many civilians were trapped, and dozens were killed in the attacks. On 21 February the government intercepted a call by famous war reporter Marie Colvin: "The [SAA] is simply shelling a city of cold, starving civilians". In a lawsuit filed in U.S. District Court for the District of Columbia, Colvin's family provided evidence that the Syrian government had tracked Colvin from Lebanon, triangulated the call to the Homs Media Center, and confirmed her location with a local informant, and that then, under orders from Maher al-Assad, the Homs units of the Syrian Republican Guard and Special Forces targeted her location, using a method known as bracketing, where multiple rockets were launched to either side, drawing closer with each round, before hitting it directly. The lawsuit alleged that Zahreddine planned the artillery attack along with Ali Mamluk, Director of Syria's National Intelligence Bureau and Rafiq Shahadah, former Director of Military Intelligence. French photographer Remi Ochlik was killed and British photographer Paul Conroy, French reporter Edith Bouvier, and Syrian interpreter Wael al-Omar were wounded in the same attack.

Following the start of the Aleppo offensive (October 2013), Zahreddine was originally going to lead an assault to Anadan. However, he was requested for assistance in Deir ez-Zor due to Major General Jameh's death. While there, he became known for frequently visiting the front line and interacting with ordinary soldiers. On 27 November 2013, while commanding his forces in al-Rashdiya district, Zahreddine was wounded in the leg by a bullet. Zahreddine and his son Yarob travelled to as-Suwayda in September 2015 in order to attend the funeral of Sheikh Wahid al-Balous, a Druze leader who had been a prominent anti-war activist.

Sometime after 2013, Zahreddine was promoted from Brigadier General to Major General. By 2016, he was leading 7,000 troops in the battle to retake the eastern city of Deir ez-Zor from ISIS. He led the 104th Airborne Brigade, which formed the core of the city's defense.

In 2016, he was pictured posing next to hanging corpses of ISIS fighters that appeared to have been tortured and cut up or were remains of a suicide bombing. In 2017, Zahreddine was added to a European Union sanctions list for his role in "violent repression against the civilian population, including during the siege of Baba Amr in February 2012."

On 5 September 2017, Zahreddine was congratulated by President Bashar Assad for his role at Deir ez-Zor during the over 3-year long siege of the city by ISIS. He used the occasion to thank allies for lifting the siege and tell Syrian refugees to "never return", saying that "even if the state forgives you, we will never forgive nor forget". In a subsequent audio message, however, Zahreddine claimed that he had meant that only those who had taken up arms against the Syrian Army should not return.

== Personal life ==
Issam's oldest son, Yarob, also fought with the 104th Brigade in Deir ez-Zor.

== Death ==
On 18 October 2017, Zahreddine was killed when his vehicle hit an ISIL land mine in Hawija Saqr near Deir Ezzor as he was conducting an operation against ISIL. His funeral took place in As-Suwayda on 20 October 2017.

On the night of 30 April 2025, amidst armed clashes in southern Syria, in which the Syrian Armed Forces General Security Service occupied the native village of Zahreddine, As-Sawra al-Kabira, (located on the northern edge of Al-Surah al-Saghirah district), the shrine and museum was burned and destroyed by the attacking forces. Images of the burning and destruction of the tomb of Zahreddine was largely shared and celebrated on pro-HTS social media accounts. No party officially claimed the destruction of the shrine, which was blamed on the collective attacking forces of the armed Deraa bedouins, the newly formed Syrian Army and the General Security forces.

== See also ==
- Ali Abdullah Ayyoub
- Maher al-Assad
- Druze in Syria
