= Syrian Desert campaign (2017–2024) =

Military operation

Syrian Desert campaign (December 2017–December 2024)
- Part of the Syrian civil war and Russian intervention in the Syrian civil war
Date	16 December 2017 – 8 December 2024 (6 years, 11 months, 3 weeks and 1 day)
Location	Syrian Desert, Syria
Result	Inconclusive: Islamic State loses all territory in Syria, but widespread insurgency continues; Fall of the Assad regime and withdrawal of Iranian and Russian forces

Belligerents
Ba'athist Syria; Russia; Iran; Allied groups: Hezbollah; Popular Mobilization Forces; Islamic Resistance in Iraq; Liwa Fatemiyoun; Liwa Abu al-Fadhal al-Abbas; Free Palestine Movement; Palestine Liberation Army; Wagner Group	Islamic State

Commanders and leaders
Suhayl al-Hasan (WIA); Haj Nasser Jamil Hadraj †; Ghassan Muhammad Hijazi †; Vyacheslav Gladkikh †; Muhammad Taysar Az-Zahir †	Abu Abdallah Sheikh Qaduli (Top IS commander in the Syrian Desert)

Units involved
Syrian Arab Armed Forces; Army; 4th Division; 12th Brigade; Republican Guard; 47th Regiment; 25th Division; 2nd Corps; 14th Division; 3rd Corps; 3rd Division; Qalamoun Shield (until 2018); 11th Division; 17th Division; 137th Brigade; 18th Division; 131st Brigade; 5th Assault Corps; 4th Brigade; Ba'ath Brigades; Liwa Al-Quds; ISIS Hunters (until 2023); Air Force; National Defence Forces; Local Defence Forces; Baqir Brigade; Lions of Hussein; Military Security Shield Forces: Russian Armed Forces; Ground Forces; 29th Army; 200th Brigade; Airborne Forces; 45th Brigade; Aerospace Forces; Islamic Revolutionary Guard Corps; Kata'ib Hezbollah; Kata'ib Sayyid al-Shuhada "Al-Qatarji" militia "Hamisho" militia “Mohamed Hamshou” militia Qamr Bani Hashim Division “Abu Zainab” militia	Military of the Islamic State

Strength
Unknown number of SAA soldiers 1,385 Iranian-backed fighters (2019)	2,000–3,000 main force, 300 reinforcements (2019 estimate); 500–600 (UN estimate, 2024)

Casualties and losses
2018 offensive 237 killed 9 killed March 2019–2024 (Note: Accumulated fatalities according to SOHR: 1,611 pro-gov. (inc. 158 Iranian-backed & 4 Russians), 1,096 IS & 14 civilians in 2019–2021; 264 pro-gov. (inc. 27 Iranian-backed), 166 IS & 17 civilians in 2022; 412 pro-gov. (inc. 63 Iranian-backed), 46 IS & 171 civilians in 2023; 568 pro-gov. (inc. 44 Iranian-backed), 58 IS & 78 civilians in 2024); 3,563 killed 292 killed 4 killed Total: 4,510+ killed	2018 offensive 138 killed March 2019–2024; 1,336 killed Total: 1,474 killed
- 280 civilians killed (March 2019–2024); Total: 5,980+ killed

The Syrian Desert campaign was a campaign of the Syrian Arab Armed Forces forces and their allies aimed at eliminating the remnants of the Islamic State in the Syrian Desert region.

== Background ==
Following a series of campaigns between 2016 and 2017 by the Syrian government and allied forces, the American-led CJTF-OIR coalition and Syrian Democratic Forces (SDF), Turkey and its supporting rebels, the remnants of the Islamic State's forces west of the Euphrates River withdrew into a large pocket in the Syrian Desert, stretching between the western Homs Governorate and the eastern Deir ez-Zor Governorate, from where they utilized guerrilla tactics to target pro-government forces.

== Timeline ==
=== 2017 ===
By the end of 2017, the Syrian Army's 5th Legion, supported by the Iranian Islamic Revolutionary Guard Corps (IRGC) and Lebanese Hezbollah, had reportedly seized 50 square kilometers of desert territory in the southeastern countryside of Deir ez-Zor, expanding their buffer-zone around the strategic T-2 Pumping Station.

=== 2018 ===
==== January–March ====
In mid-January 2018, five Hezbollah fighters, including a prominent commander, were killed by IS in the eastern countryside of Homs Governorate.

On 17 March, 14 soldiers were killed when IS forces captured the T-2 Pumping Station. In the following days, government forces made attempts to recapture T-2. One week after the capture of the station, 26 government troops and nine IS fighters were killed during clashes in the desert near Mayadin. Between 24 and 29 March, several IS attacks were repelled in the Mayadin area, while between 31 March and 1 April, IS forces were driven back from the T-2 area.

==== April–June ====
In early April, IS forces in the Homs Governorate employed an inghimasi attack on the Shaer gas field near Palmyra. The battle lasted for several hours, with the attack eventually being repelled by the Syrian Army with assistance of Russian attack helicopters. Concurrently, IS seized several points between Abu Kamal and Mayadin. Attacks were also conducted along the Sukhnah-Deir ez-Zor highway. In Mid-April, IS attacks south of al-Qaryatayn left 18 pro-government and five IS fighters dead, with the militants seizing several positions. IS made further advances by seizing an air defense base south of the town, but were again repelled by Russian-backed government forces. Pro-government forces also regained positions along the Sukhnah-Deir ez-Zor highway. Meanwhile, IS attacks continued in the Mayadin area and on 18 April, 25 pro-government and 13 IS fighters were killed in clashes, while on 20 April, IS attempted to attack the T-3 Pumping Station.

Between 8 and 11 May, the Syrian Army managed to push IS 60 kilometers from Mayadin, clearing 1,500 square kilometers of territory in an attempt to split the IS pocket in the desert. On 22 May, an IS attack involving suicide bombers and armored vehicles on a military outpost near the T-3 Pumping Station left between 26 and 30 pro-government fighters dead, according to the pro-opposition Syrian Observatory for Human Rights (SOHR) and local residents, while the military put the death toll at 16. The next day, IS militants attacked a Syrian-Russian military convoy near Mayadin, leaving 35 pro-government forces dead, including nine Russians. Four of the Russians were regular soldiers, while Russia reported that 43 attackers were also killed during the fighting. Three days later, IS conducted more attacks near Mayadin and Abu Kamal.

On 4 June, IS attacked government forces along a 100-kilometer front from Mayadin to Abu Kamal, capturing two or three towns on the western bank of the Euphrates. The militants attacked on two fronts, with IS fighters coming from both the desert, west of the Euphrates, and from their territory on the eastern bank of the river. A few days before the assault, around 400 IS fighters crossed the Euphrates from their enclave to the east following heavy shelling of government positions. The capture of the towns cut the Deir ez-Zor-Abu Kamal highway. The following day, pro-government forces recaptured the areas they had lost.

On 8 June, IS renewed its offensive and managed to break the Syrian Army's lines around Abu Kamal by using 10 suicide bombers, including several SVBIEDs. IS fighters managed to break into the city and fighting came close to the city center. The attack once again cut the highway. However, the Syrian Army subsequently counterattacked and by the following day it was reported that the military managed to re-capture the city. During the fighting, the commander of the Syrian Army's 11th Armored Division, General Ali Muhammad al-Hussein, was killed in clashes on the Abu Kamal outskirts. The commander of Hezbollah's Rocket Division and two Iranian IRGC soldiers, including an officer, were also killed. IS's offensive against Abu Kamal continued on 10 June until the militants withdrew from the city on 11 June. Overall, 246 pro-government and 138 IS fighters were killed between 22 May and 11 June.

On 17 June, IS launched a surprise attack on government forces around the T-3 Pumping Station, destroying one tank and killing several Syrian Army soldiers. The next day, government reinforcements from the Republican Guard, National Defence Forces, Liwa Fatemiyoun, as well as additional Hezbollah fighters, were sent in preparation for a new operation against IS in the region. The same day, the military seized several IS positions between the T-2 airbase and al-Hamima and by 20 June pro-government forces reportedly cleared 1,200 km^{2} of territory in the Homs-Deir ez-Zor region, killing at least 50 IS militants. In addition, government forces seized 2,500 square kilometers of IS-held territory along the Iraqi border on 21 June. However, IS attacks from the Deir ez-Zor desert on government positions around the Euphrates continued throughout the summer, during which dozens of Syrian Army soldiers were killed; some estimates by the local observers were that up to 1,000 IS fighters were still hiding in the Homs-Deir ez-Zor desert pocket.

==== July–September ====
On 31 August, the Syrian Army and the pro-government Palestinian militia Liwa al-Quds launched a large anti-IS operation. forcing IS to retreat far into the desert according to pro-government media. Later, IS attacks on 2 September near Mayadin and south of Deir ez-Zor left 22 pro-government and at least eight IS fighters dead.

The Syrian Army advanced 30 kilometers into IS territory during an offensive between 10 and 11 September according to pro-government media and advanced further between 14 and 15 September, nearly splitting the pocket. By the end of 15 September, the military had reportedly captured three towns. By this point, since the offensive started on September 10, 10 pro-government and eight IS fighters had been killed. On September 16, IS launched a large counter-offensive, recapturing all of the territory it had recently lost and killing over 25 soldiers. However, on 17 September, the military counterattacked and once again captured all the areas it had lost the previous day. The Army reportedly continued to advance against IS by 19 September, amid fighting that left another nine IS fighters and two government soldiers dead, until fighting died down.

==== October–December ====
On 4 November, 11 people were killed in an explosion at a Syrian military base along the highway connecting Damascus and Deir ez-Zor, including six Russian private military contractors. The next day, during fighting east of Sukhnah, five soldiers and eight IS fighters were killed.

=== 2019: IS insurgency begins ===
The death of three Russian soldiers was confirmed after they had gone missing during an IS ambush in late February 2019. Several Syrian servicemen were also reported killed in the ambush. According to Russia, a group of more than 30 IS fighters who took part in the ambush were tracked down and “destroyed”. Around the same time, a Russian PMC was killed by a landmine in the region. At the end of February, the military started combing operations in the desert against the IS pocket and in early March, the Army conducted airstrikes against IS positions near Sukhnah, while preparations were taking place for the military to launch an operation in the area.

On 30 March, Syrian Army reinforcements were sent to the Palmyra countryside after several IS ambushes took place along the Palmyra-Deir ez-Zor highway over the previous two weeks, one of which–on 24 March–left five soldiers dead. Two days later, at the start of April, IS conducted a large attack on Army positions near Palmyra which was repelled after airstrikes were conducted by the Syrian Air Force. By 3 April, more Syrian Army reinforcements were sent in anticipation of a new IS attack on government positions. Meanwhile, a group of soldiers went missing following an IS ambush along the road near Haribshah on 31 March. On 11 and 18 April, two more ambushes took place with another military convoy going missing along the road between Palmyra and Deir ez-Zor, while an Army unit was ambushed north of al-Sukhnah. In addition, heavy fighting took place between 12 and 14 April, involving members of the Palestinian Liwa al-Quds militia.

In April 2019, IS activity indicated that the terrorist organization was in control of Jebel Bishri, a mountain near the intersection of the borders of the Raqqa, Deir ez-Zor, and Homs Governorates, as well as the surrounding area between the Al-Sukhnah and Deir ez-Zor countrysides. On 21 April, IS captured the mountainous town of al-Kawm, forcing the Syrian Army and pro-government Palestinian militias to retreat. IS hit-and-run attacks continued into late June and fighting between 24 March and 23 June, according to the Syrian Observatory for Human Rights, left 161 pro-government and 53 IS fighters dead. Of the pro-government dead, 10 were Palestinian Liwa al-Quds militiamen, while nine were Iranian-led troops and two were Russians. Over 70 of the soldiers were killed in the month of April alone.

=== 2020 ===
IS attacks continued throughout 2019 and into 2020. Between March 2019 and October 2020, 792 pro-government and 397 IS militants had been killed in the fighting in the desert. Government fatalities included 140 Iranian-led fighters and two Russians. 11 civilians were also killed.

In February 2020, the SAA, backed by Russian military units, launched an offensive to capture Jebel Bishri and its surrounding regions, which had been under IS control since April 2019. This offensive coincided with an NDF offensive to clear out IS forces from the southeast Raqqa Governorate region. In early March, the SAA managed to clear the Jebel Bishri and its environs, including al-Kawm; however, IS attacks continued in the region, with the majority of IS forces apparently having relocated during the offensive.

IS attacked pro-government forces in al-Sukhna in the Syrian Desert on 9 April 2020. More than twenty fighters on each side were killed.

In early July, 18 pro-government fighters and 26 IS militants were killed, after a jihadist assault on government positions near al-Sukhna.

Syrian Observatory for Human Rights activists monitored an armed attack by unknown gunmen in August, believed to be carried out by IS cells, a vehicle affiliated to government-backed militias in the area between Al-Tabani and Ma’adan in southern Al-Raqqah was targeted. The attack resulted in the death of the “head of Al-Tabani district” and two othergovernment-backed militiamen.

On 18 August, an IED planted by unknown assailants, targeting a Russian convoy on a side road near Deir Ezzor exploded killing a Russian Major General Vyacheslav Gladkikh and left three soldiers injured, one of which died almost a month later. Russia held IS responsible even though no group claimed responsibility the attack. On the same day, the Russian and Syrian air forces carried out a large-scale joint operation aimed at wiping out IS cells across the Syrian Desert. According to Russia, the operation killed 327 IS militants, destroyed 134 shelters, 17 observation points, 7 stores of ammunition and 5 underground warehouses for weapons and ammunition from 18 to 24 August.

Since 1 September, SOHR activists have documented great fatalities among both sides due to the military operations in the Syrian desert, including airstrikes, security campaigns and attacks. At least 38 IS members and 19 Syrian soldiers and loyal militiamen were also killed in the same period.

On 5 September 2020, it was reported that the SAA had recaptured the Doubayat Gas Field from IS, following a 12-day offensive, thus recapturing the remainder of IS's pocket in the Syrian Desert. By 21 September, the SAA had secured control of the area, with aid from the Russian Armed Forces. However, the large-scale IS insurgency in the region continued unabated. On 23 September, IS forces launched a large-scale attack on SAA forces near the Raqqa–Homs Governorate boundary, killing many Syrian soldiers. In response, the Syrian Army moved to increase its presence in the Syrian Desert. On 25 September, it was reported that Russian and Syrian warplanes had destroyed multiple IS hideouts in the Central Syria region. A source from the SAA stated that IS would likely be able to continue hiding in the Syrian Desert, until the Syrian Army carries out a large-scale campaign with thousands of soldiers to clear every single cave used by IS.

In early November 2020, SOHR reported that Liwa al-Quds and Baqir Brigade troops had been dispatched as reinforcements for the desert counter-insurgency operations. Meanwhile, the Russian Air Force flew several bombing missions against IS cells in the desert.

On 30 December 2020, Syrian state media reported an ambush on a bus in the Kobajjep area near Palmyra had killed at least 39 people. A senior military defector in the region said that the bus was carrying Syrian Army troops and pro-government militiamen from Deir ez-Zor, and was returning to the Tiyas Military Airbase. The next day, Islamic State claimed responsibility for the attack, saying it had killed 40 Syrian Army soldiers and badly wounded six others. The statement was carried by Islamic State's Amaq News Agency.

According to SOHR statistics, IS managed to kill 780 Syrian soldiers and pro-government militiamen in 2020, including 108 Iranian-backed non-Syrian militiamen, in ambushes, attacks, shelling and clashes in the Syrian desert. Also, IS lost 507 fighters in clashes and airstrikes by Russian and Syrian fighter jets in the same period.

=== 2021 ===
On 3 January 2021, Islamic State militants killed 15 people and wounded 15 others during an ambush targeting oil tanker transport trucks and buses traveling down a highway between Ithriya and Salamiyah in central Syria. On 4 January 2021, Islamic State militants killed 12 Syrian soldiers and three civilians, including a little girl, as well as the injury of more than 16 others, including four civilians. On 11 January, eight pro-government fighters including members of Quds Force were killed by IS members, while 11 others sustained various injuries, in the southern desert of Deir Ezzor. On 27 January, seven members of Syrian Army and Russian-backed militias died due to the fierce clashes and attack by IS on their vehicles, while IS lost 11 fighters in the same clashes and Russian airstrikes.

On 3 February, 19 Syrian soldiers including 11 members of the Baqir Brigade were killed in a "surprise attack" by IS militants in eastern Hama.

On 19–20 February, at least 130 Russian airstrikes had killed 21 members of IS in the Syrian Desert, according to SOHR.

On 24 February, a member of the 4th Armoured Division was found decapitated at al-Aqoulah near Mayadin, one day after he was missing at a water facility in Boqruss Tahtani; meanwhile, nine pro-government forces were killed by IS militants in the region between Aleppo, Hama and al-Raqqa, according to SOHR.

On 5–9 March, some 250 Russian airstrikes killed 43 IS members in the Syrian Desert, according to SOHR.

On 11–13 March, Russian jets executed nearly 97 airstrikes on IS positions in the triangle of Aleppo-Hama-Raqqa, according to SOHR.

On 15 March, Russian jets executed 80 airstrikes, killing 13 IS members and destroying caves and positions in the Syrian Desert, according to SOHR.

On 21 March, Russian jets executed 54 airstrikes, killing 7 IS members and destroying vehicles, bunkers and caves in the Syrian Desert, according to SOHR.

On 24 March, seven pro-government militiamen were killed and three others were injured by an IS attack in the desert of Uqayribat, according to SOHR.

On 26 March, Russian jets executed nearly 30 airstrikes, killing 6 IS members in Al-Sukhnah desert, east of Homs, according to SOHR.

On 3–5 April, Russian jets executed over 200 airstrikes, killing 29 IS members across the Syrian Desert, according to SOHR.

On 6 April, IS militants raided the town of al-Saan in Salamiyah District, western Hama, kidnapping dozens of people, including eight soldiers. Several people were later released by the terror group, while two people were reportedly killed.

On 19 April, Russia's defense ministry announced that it had killed "up to 200 fighters", by targeting a "terrorist" base northeast of Palmyra.

On 10 May, four pro-regime militants were killed, meanwhile IS lost at least one member, during clashes in the vicinity of Bayoud near Rahjan, eastern countryside of Hama. On the same day, seven pro-regime soldiers died from an explosion of at least two mines in Jabal al-Amour area, to the west of the al-Sukhnah.

On 3 June, a convoy of seven vehicles were attacked by IS militants in Wadi Abyadh in Al-Sukhnah region, which led to the death of 25 pro-government soldiers, including an Iranian military advisor Hassan Abdullahzadeh and his companion Muhsin Abbasi, in addition to a Syrian major general Nizar Abbas Al-Fuhud.

=== 2022 ===
According to the SOHR, between January and December 2022, 264 pro-government fighters, 166 IS militants and 17 civilians were killed. All IS fighters were killed by Russian airstrikes.

=== 2023 ===
In August 2023, IS killed 33 Syrian soldiers near Mayadin, and 10 pro-government militiamen in Raqqa Governorate. In November, IS reportedly carried out simultaneous attacks against pro-government troops in Raqqa, Homs, and Deir ez-Zor, killing 26 National Defence Forces militiamen and four soldiers.

=== 2024 ===
In March 2024, IS fighters ambushed a Liwa al-Quds vehicle carrying ammunition and guns in eastern Homs countryside, killing the three guards and capturing the cargo. By mid-2024, researchers of the Counter Extremism Project and Rojava Information Center assessed that IS was regaining strength in Syria, increasing attacks in the desert against the Syrian government and the Syrian Democratic Forces. In these attacks, the insurgents successfully targeted security outposts and patrols, causing dozens of losses. At this point, the United Nations estimated that about 500 to 600 IS fighters were stationed in central Syria.

On 8 December 2024, US forces launched dozens of airstrikes on more than 75 Islamic State targets in Syria after the fall of the Assad regime.

== Casualties ==
Between December 2017, and mid-April 2020, at least 800 pro-government fighters were killed during the desert insurgency. According to the SOHR, 416 pro-government fighters and 150 IS militants were killed between late March 2019 and mid-April 2020. The SOHR documented the deaths of 1,610 pro-government fighters and 1,096 IS militants between late March 2019 and the end of December 2021.

According to the SOHR, 264 pro-government fighters, 166 IS militants and 17 civilians were killed in 2022. In 2023, 417 pro-government fighters, 46 IS militants and 167 civilians were killed. All civilians were killed by IS fighters.

On 12 June 2024, 16 Syrian soldiers, including an officer, were killed in a minefield laid by IS militants and an attack by the group in the Sukhna desert area in Homs Governorate, according to SOHR.

Between January and October 2024, 458 pro-government fighters, 47 IS militants, 57 civilians were killed. All civilians were killed by IS fighters.

== See also ==
- 2017 Western Iraq campaign
- Battle of Baghuz Fawqani – A battle in 2019 for the final IS stronghold in Syria
- Daraa insurgency
- Eastern Syria insurgency
