= Suwayda offensive =

Suwayda offensive may refer to:

- Suwayda offensive (June 2018)
- Suwayda offensive (August–November 2018)
