= Timeline of the Syrian civil war (May–August 2018) =

The following is a timeline of the Syrian Civil War from May to August 2018. Information about aggregated casualty counts is found at Casualties of the Syrian Civil War.

== May 2018 ==
=== 1 May ===
- The U.S. government announced the U.S.-led coalition's "operations to liberate the final ISIS strongholds in Syria"; the announcement said the U.S. would ensure that "populations liberated from ISIS are not exploited by the Assad regime or its Iranian supporters".

=== 3 May ===
- United States freezes funding for White Helmets.

=== 7 May ===
- A missile attack from Israel strikes depots and rocket launchers that likely belonged to Iran’s Islamic Revolutionary Guard Corps in Al-Kiswah, killing nine people.

=== 10 May ===
- The Israel Defence Forces (IDF) launched "extensive" air strikes against alleged Iranian military installations in Syria after 20 Iranian rockets were reportedly launched at Israeli army positions in the Western Golan Heights.

=== 16 May ===
- After an evacuation deal with the rebels reached earlier in the month the Syrian Arab Army (SAA) announced that 1,200 square kilometers of rebel territory in the north Homs-south Hama region was under control, according to Khaled Iskef on Twitter.

=== 21 May ===
- After the departure of 1,600 Islamic State of Iraq and the Levant (ISIL) fighters and their families from al-Hajar al-Aswad and the Yarmouk Camp, government forces regained full territorial control over Damascus' suburbs and countryside for the first time in nearly seven years. The deal entailed that the evacuation towards the Eastern Syrian Desert by ISIL forces would be allowed.

== June 2018 ==
=== 12 June ===
- The SOHR reported that at least 13 civilians were killed by the U.S.-led coalition strikes in Tal al-Shayer.

=== 22 June ===
- The Syrian government launches an offensive in the eastern part of the southern province of Daraa.

=== 24 June ===
- The US government warned rebel forces in Daraa that they could not expect military support.

== July 2018 ==
=== July 6 ===
- As a result of the Southern Syria offensive, which had begun in June, the Syrian Army backed by Russian forces reached the border with Jordan and captured the Nasib Border Crossing.

=== July 12 ===
- About 30 civilians were killed in the eastern Syrian province of Deir al-Zor in an air strike conducted by the U.S.-led coalition, according to the Syrian government. The incident was tentatively admitted to by the U.S. military.

=== July 24 ===
- The Israel Defense Forces intercepted a Syrian Sukhoi fighter jet that they said had crossed about one mile into Israeli airspace. The IDF shot the aircraft down using two Patriot missiles.

=== July 31 ===
- The Royal Jordanian Army attacked Islamic State militants near the Jordanian border at the Yarmouk Valley.

== August 2018 ==
=== August 1 ===
- With the collapse of rebel factions in south Syria, and expectations of a future offensive in Idlib, multiple north Syria FSA factions announce a new coalition, the National Liberation Front.

=== August 2 ===
- Russia criticized United States for not helping to fight against terrorist group Islamic State of Iraq and the Levant in Syria, Russian General Staff Main Operations Directorate Colonel General Sergei Rudskoi said in statements, "The Russian Federation regularly reported information about the escalation and dire humanitarian situation in southwestern Syria to the guarantor countries of the southern de-escalation zone the United States and Jordan. However, no measures were taken to stabilize the situation by foreign partners".

=== August 4 ===
Aziz Asber (Syrian Scientific Research Centre facility director in charge of the chemical weapons program) and his driver were killed in a blasts for a Sticky bomb, in the city of Masyaf. The Abu Amara Battalion claimed the attack, but authorities blamed Israel or other governments for this attack.

=== August 6 ===
- The Syrian government launches an offensive in the Suwayda and Rif Dimashq Governorates against Islamic State of Iraq and the Levant.
