= 5th Mechanized Division =

- الفرقة الخامسةميكا
- Syrian Armed Forces Flag
- Active: 1970 – 2024
- Country: Ba'athist Syria (surrendered)
- Allegiance: Syrian Arab Armed Forces (surrendered)
- Branch: Syrian Arab Army (surrendered)
- Type: Mechanized infantry
- Role: Conventional warfare
- Size: Division
- Part of: 1st Corps (surrendered)
- Garrison/HQ: Daraa; Izra (12th Armored Brigade, 175th Artillery Regiment); Nawa (112th Mechanized Brigade); Saida (38th Infantry Brigade)
- Engagements: Black September in Jordan; Yom Kippur War; Syrian Civil War; Daraa Governorate campaign; Idlib Governorate clashes (September 2011 – March 2012); 2012 Homs offensive; Northwestern Syria campaign (October 2017–February 2018); As-Suwayda offensive (August–November 2018)

Commanders
- Current Commander: Maj. Gen. Wasel al-Samir
- Chief of Staff: Maj. Gen. Muhammad Khleif Al-Muhammad
- Brigade Commanders: Maj. Gen. Suhail Abbas (12th Brigade); Brig. Gen. Ahmed Yousef Jarad (132nd Brigade)
- Notable commanders: Lt. Gen. Ali Aslan; Lt. Gen. Ali Abdullah Ayyoub; Maj. Gen. Mufid Hassan; Maj. Gen. Osama Horia †

The 5th Mechanized Division (Arabic: الفرقة الخامسةميكا) was a mechanized infantry division of the Syrian Arab Army. The division was part of the Syrian Army's 1st Corps.

== Command structure ==
5th Mechanized Division (2021)

- 12th Armored Brigade
- 15th Mechanized Brigade
- 112th Mechanized Brigade
- 132nd Mechanized Brigade
- 38th Infantry Brigade
- 59th Commando Battalion
- 175th Artillery Regiment

== Combat history ==
The 5th Division was one of the oldest divisions in the Syrian Arab Army and its seat in the Daraa region has changed very little over the years, already during the Six Day War the division existed and was stationed in the southwestern sector, along the border With Jordan and the Golan Heights.

=== Black September in Jordan ===
The 5th Division, at that time an infantry formation, invaded Jordan during the events of Black September in Jordan. In September 1970, the division alongside an independent armored brigade and the commando forces participated in an attack by the Syrian army in Jordan. The division then consisted of the 88th Armored Brigade, the 91st Armored Brigade and the 67th Mechanized Brigade (a total of about 200 T-55 tanks).

A second, much larger, Syrian incursion occurred in the same time: it consisted of two armored and one mechanized infantry brigades of the 5th Infantry Division, and around 300 tanks. Although the Syrian tanks had PLA markings, the troops were Syrian Army regulars. After an ineffectual defence by the massively outnumbered Jordanian 40th Armoured Brigade, the 5th Division's attack was repelled with heavy losses on 22 September 1970 mostly through the efforts of the Royal Jordanian Air Force.

=== Yom Kippur War ===
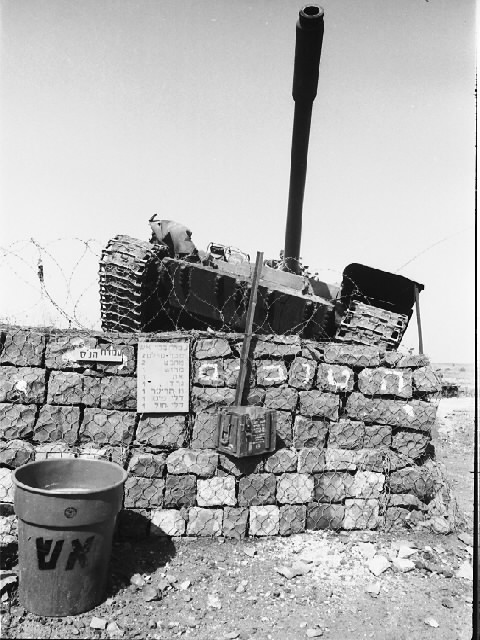
Syrian T-55 tank of the 5th Mechanized Division that was blocked from attacking an IDF post.

The 5th Division also saw action on the Golan Heights during the Yom Kippur War, being deployed alongside the 1st, 3rd, 7th, and 9th divisions. These divisions were supposed to break the Israeli defense line in the Golan Heights and in the first phase advance inward with the help of the reserve forces (mainly 1st and 3rd divisions) up to the Jordan River line. The 5th Division, under the command of Brig. Gen. Ali Aslan, was responsible for the front south and east of Rafid, and north of the Yarmouk Valley. Although designated as an infantry division, it was actually a mechanized division.

The 5th Division was the only deployed division which had its full complement of armoured and mechanised vehicles, with some 10,000 men, 200 tanks, 72 artillery pieces, and an equal number of anti-aircraft weapons. During this period, the division was composed of four brigades: 46th Armored Brigade (also called the 12th Brigade), 132nd Mechanized Brigade, 112th Infantry Brigade and 61st Infantry Brigade. Before the war, the 47th Independent Armored Brigade was attached to the division.

Of the Syrian forces along the border in the Golan Heights, the 5th Division was perhaps the most successful in terms of attacking targets. The forces of the division managed to break through the defense line between the Rapid and the El-Al areas, advancing deep into the center of the Golan and fighting alongside the forces of the 1st and 9th divisions tn the area of Nefam and in the deep south in the El Al area. The forces of the division participated in most of the battles in the southern sector, including the fighting at Tel Saki, the fighting around Hosnia and the fighting along the Petroleum Road that connects the southern sector to the center of the plateau and camp volume.

=== Syrian Civil War ===
Prior to 2011 the division was part of the 1st Corps. Commenting on events during the April–May 2011 Daraa siege, Henry Boyd of the International Institute for Strategic Studies noted that "the locally based 5th Armoured Division was supplemented by a brigade of the 4th Armoured Division under the command of Maher al-Assad." Izra is base to the 5th Division's 12th Armoured Brigade and 175th Artillery Regiment. The 12th Armoured Brigade has been reported as taking part in the Siege of Menagh Air Base, near the Turkish border.

On 9 November 2014, during the First Battle of Al-Shaykh Maskin, rebels captured the al-Hesh northern and southern hills, the Army training ground, al-Rahba battalion base, "al-Konkors" battalion base, the medical base, "al-Hejajia" tanks battalion base and Hawi checkpoint around the city of Nawa. Later, rebels took control over the entire city after the Army retreated towards Brigade 112 HQ base (located between the two towns) as well as Shaykh Maskin. Brigade 112 HQ was eventually captured by the rebels according to two Arab news agencies. Both local rebel groups and the al-Nusra Front claimed credit for the opposition advance. Syrian state broadcaster SANA said troops were "redeploying and reorganizing in the Nawa area... in order to prepare for upcoming fighting." At the end of the day, SOHR reported, the Army advanced inside Shaykh Maskin.

As of 10 November 2014, according to a military source cited by pro-government media, the Army was still present in the South and East Districts of Shaykh Maskin, and reportedly cleared the two besieged areas surrounding Base 82 and Brigade 112. The next day, rebels advanced in Shaykh Maskin and took control of new positions and eventually captured the eastern neighborhoods on 12 November. In 2016, during the Second Battle of Shaykh Maskin the town was again recaptured by the Syrian Army with participation of 5th Division.

In 2017, the 12th Brigade briefly fought in the neighboring Suwayda Governorate. Furthermore, a 59th Commandos Battalion of the 5th Division participated in the fighting around Abu Dali, Idlib during the 2018 Northwestern Syria campaign. Since late 2018, the 5th Division units were given modern Russian equipment, trained in a new offensive strategy and filled with new graduates of the military academies. In June 2019, the 112th Brigade of the 5th Division was deployed to Hama for reinforcement of the Syrian Arab Army positions.

== Bibliography ==
- Cooper, Tom (2015). Syrian Conflagration: The Civil War 2011-2013. Middle East@War Volume 1. Helion & Co. ISBN 978-1-910294-10-9.
