= Wajih Al Madani =

Palestinian military commander (1921–1991)

- Born: Wajih Husayn Al Madani; 1921; Acre, Mandatory Palestine
- Died: 1991 (aged 69–70)
- Military career
- Allegiance: Palestine Liberation Army; Kuwait Army
- Rank: Major General
- Conflicts: Six-Day War

Wajih Al Madani (Arabic: وجيه المدني; 1921–1991) was a Palestinian major general who was the first commander-in-chief of the Palestine Liberation Army (PLA). He also served as the commander of the Kuwaiti security forces and director of the Kuwait Armed Forces.

== Biography ==
Al Madani was born in Acre in 1921. He was a corporal in an Arab force during World War II under British mandate. After the war he attended the Sarafand British Military College in Palestine graduating as a second lieutenant in 1946. He was tasked to train the Saudi Arabian army from 1946 to 1947. He also trained 85 Palestinians together with Hazim Khalidi, and this group led the defense of Palestine against the Zionists in 1948.

Al Madani settled in Kuwait in 1952 where he trained the Kuwaiti army and was involved in the establishment of its units. He also served as an officer for the Kuwaiti Royal Guard and became a major general.

Al Madani was appointed the commander-in-chief of the PLA on 24 September 1964 when it was established by the Palestine Liberation Organization. He was a lieutenant colonel before his appointment and became a lieutenant general with his new post. In the initial period the PLA was based in Cairo. Al Madani was also head of a military group called Heroes of Return which started an armed struggle in October 1966. This group was attached to the PLA. He served as the commander-in-chief of the PLA until 1969 when he resigned from the post. His resignation partly occurred as a result of the Syrians interference on the PLA activities. During his term as the PLA commander Al Madani was also subject to the pressure of the Egyptian chief-of-staff Muhammad Fawzi. Al Madani was replaced by Abd al Razzaq Yahya in the post a few months after his resignation.

Al Madani returned to Kuwait and was named as the commander of the Kuwaiti security forces in 1970. He was later appointed director of the Kuwaiti Armed Forces. His tenure in the Kuwaiti army lasted until his retirement in 1984.

Al Madani died in 1991.
