= 15th Special Forces Division =

- الفرقة 15 للقوات الخاصة
- Syrian Special Forces Patch
- Active: mid 1990s - 8 December 2024
- Country: Ba'athist Syria
- Allegiance: Syrian Arab Armed Forces
- Branch: Syrian Army
- Type: Special forces
- Role: Close-quarters combat Counter-insurgency; Counter-terrorism; Direct action Raiding; Reconnaissance; Special operations Unconventional warfare Urban warfare
- Size: 5 regiments 1 battalion
- Part of: 1st Corps
- Garrison/HQ: As-Suwayda
- Tactical color marking
- Engagements: Syrian Civil War; April–May 2011 Daraa siege; May 2011 Baniyas siege; Siege of Hama (2011); Siege of Homs; Idlib Governorate clashes (June 2012–April 2013); Aleppo offensive (October–December 2013); Battle of Al-Shaykh Maskin (2015–2016); 2018 Southern Syria offensive; As-Suwayda offensive (August–November 2018); March 2020 Daraa clashes

Commanders
- Commander: Maj. Gen. Suhail Fajr Hassan
- Notable commanders: Maj. Gen. Ghassan al-Yasmina; Maj. Gen. Ramadan Ramadan; Maj. Gen. Fo'ad Hamoudeh

The 15th Special Forces Division (Arabic: الفرقة 15 للقوات الخاصة) was a division of the Syrian Armed Forces specializing in light infantry operations, based in the As-Suwayda Governorate. The Division was part of the Syrian Army's 1st Corps.

== Role ==
Syrians used the term "Special Forces" to describe the 14th, 15th divisions, as well as the independent "special forces" regiments, but they more closely resemble conventional light infantry units, than Western Special Forces in both mission and composition.

The term Special Forces was applied ostensibly because of their specialized training in airborne and air assault operations, but they were regarded as light infantry forces and elite only in relation to the conventional armored and mechanized brigades of the Syrian Army.

== Command structure ==
15th Special Forces Division (2022)

- 35th Special Forces Regiment
- 44th Special Forces Regiment
- 127th Special Forces Regiment
- 404th Armored Regiment
- 405th Armored Regiment
- 176th Artillery Battalion

== Combat history ==
Holliday wrote in 2013 that "the 15th Special Forces Division is a relatively recent formation, established between the mid-1990s restructuring of Ali Haidar’s former Special Forces Command" and the beginning of the Syrian Civil War.

Since it was founded, the division comprised four regiments under the leadership of Major General Jihad Jaber, the commander of First Corps, and its leader, former Major General Fuad Hamoudeh, Brigadier General Esber Abboud, Brigadier General Ahmed Younis al Oukda, commander of the 404th Tank Regiment, Ahmed el Kousa, commander of the 405th Artillery Regiment, and Brigadier Hassan Aizora, commander of the 44th Special Forces regiment.

=== Syrian Civil War ===
Consistent reporting in mid-February 2012 showed that all three regiments of the 15th Special Forces Division had left their bases near the Jordanian border to join the fight in Homs.

The Syrian Government committed at least one Special Forces regiment to Idlib in 2011 and strongly reinforced the region with three additional Special Forces regiments, an armored brigade, and a detachment of 4th Armored Division troops by the spring of 2012. The 76th Armored Brigade and 41st Special Forces Regiment arrived in Idilb by late February 2012, establishing positions in the north and south of Idlib Governorate respectively. Two of the Special Forces regiments that participated in the February 2012 siege of Homs also moved to Idilb, namely, the 15th Division's 35th Special Forces Regiment, which moved to Jisr al-Shughour, where it secured the key line of communication to coastal Latakia, and the 14th Division's 556th Special Forces Regiment, which occupied positions south of Maarrat al-Nu'man. Elements of the 4th Armored Division also moved to northern Syria after the siege of Homs, but it is unclear how long those elite forces remained. Most of the Division's reported activity in the north took place that spring, and it is difficult to see whether activity or reporting tapered off.

In mid-March 2012, troops from the 4th Armored Division, 76th Armored Brigade, and 35th Special Forces Regiment quickly cleared rebels out of Idlib city, but pushed rebels into the surrounding countryside in the process. The operation represented a relatively modest force commitment. Imagery released by the U.S. State Department showed between thirty and thirty-five armored vehicles encircling Idilb in the operation, which represents far less than one brigade's worth of vehicles according to Syrian Army doctrine. Since 2019, the 15th Division was under rebuilding process. It was reorganized and supplied with graduates of the military academies.

== Loyalty to the government ==
Human Rights Watch and Washington Institute reports seemed to confirm the existence of the 15th Special Forces Division, which appeared to have remained steadfastly loyal to the government.

== See also ==
- 14th Special Forces Division
- 25th Special Mission Forces Division
- 4th Armored Division
- Republican Guard
- List of paratrooper forces
- List of military special forces units
