= Battle of Kirkuk (2016) =

Battle between Iraqi Kurdish forces and ISIL in Iraq

Coordinates: 35.4700°N 44.3958°E

- Part of the War in Iraq (2013–2017)
- Location within Iraq
Date	21–24 October 2016 (3 days)
Location	Kirkuk, Kirkuk Governorate, Iraq
Result	Kurdish victory

Belligerents
Kurdistan Region; PKK; CJTF-OIR: United States	Islamic State

Commanders and leaders
(Kurdistan Region) Brig. Simko Rabati (Kirkuk security commander) (Kurdistan Region) Idris Rafaat (Kirkuk security official) (Kurdistan Region) Brig. Gen. Sarhad Qadir (suburban police chief) (Kurdistan Region) Polad Talabani (Peshmerga Counterterrorism Group commander) (Kurdistan Region) Lahur Talabany (head of Zanyari)	(Islamic State) Abu Islam (POW) (operations leader) (Islamic State) Abu Qudama † (Kirkuk raid commander) (Islamic State) Nizar Mahmud Abdul Ghani (POW)

Units involved
Kurdistan Region: Patriotic Union of Kurdistan; Kurdistan Democratic Party; Peshmerga; Counter-Terrorism Group (CTG); Asayish; Parastin u Zanyari; Ministry of Interior: Popular Mobilization Forces; 16th Turkmen Brigade; Kirkuk civilian vigilantes	(Islamic State) Military of ISIL: Kirkuk sleeper cells; Inghimasi fighters

Strength
Unknown	100 militants

Casualties and losses
76 killed	84 killed and several captured
- 21 civilians killed, 265+ security forces members and civilians wounded overall

The Battle of Kirkuk took place in the city of Kirkuk in northern Iraq between Kurdistan and allies and the Islamic State of Iraq and the Levant. The battle occurred less than a week after the beginning of the Battle of Mosul launched by Iraqi security forces and allies.

== The battle ==
On 21 October 2016, dozens of ISIL militants and suicide bombers, supported by local sleeper cells, entered Kirkuk and stormed a power station and police stations in the city, killing 18 members of security forces and power station workers, including 2–5 Iranian workers. The ISIL militants captured a mosque and an abandoned hotel and barricaded themselves inside. Hours later, ISIL captured 2 more hotels and holed themselves in. Over 20 ISIL militants were killed, as security forces recaptured most of the buildings.

By the next day, ISIL forces still held parts of the Aruba District and a hotel, though these were retaken later on. Government forces then began a mop-up operation to clear the city of remaining militants, with some of the latter blowing themselves as they were cornered. Many local civilians had also taken up arms, hunting, capturing and killing ISIL fighters.

On the third day of the battle, several remaining ISIL militants attempted to flee the city, with five being killed and the ISIL operations leader captured by security forces. On 24 October, the last ISIL fighters in Kirkuk were killed, including the raid commander Abu Qudama, a senior ISIL military figure of Hawija, so that the governor of Kirkuk, Nadschmeddin Karim, could declare the city completely cleared of militants. On the next day, security forces arrested Nizar Mahmud Abdul Ghani, a cousin of former President of Iraq Saddam Hussein, for having participated in the Kirkuk raid.

== See also ==
- Battle of Hawija
- Battle of Kirkuk (2017)
- 2017 Western Iraq campaign
