= 2018 Southern Syria offensive =

- Part of the Daraa Governorate campaign and the Russian military intervention in the Syrian Civil War
- Map of the operation Syrian Army control Syrian Opposition control Islamic State control Reconciliation areas with no Syrian government presence
Date	18 June – 31 July 2018 (1 month, 1 week and 6 days)
Location	Southern Syria: Daraa Governorate; Western Suwayda Governorate; Quneitra Governorate
Result	Syrian government victory
Territorial changes	Syrian Army brings the entire Daraa border with Jordan and the Golan Heights frontier under its full control

Belligerents
(Syria) Syrian Government; Russia (since 24 June); Iran: Allied militias: Palestine Liberation Army; Liwa al-Quds; Shia; Iraqi militias; Hezbollah (rebel claim); Liwa Abu al-Fadhal al-Abbas; Liwa Fatemiyoun; Ba'ath Brigades; As-Sa'iqa; SSNP; Druze militias	Syrian Opposition; Free Syrian Army; (Syrian opposition) Southern Front (surrendered); Southern Army (from 8 July) (surrendered); Ahrar al-Sham (surrendered); Jaysh al-Islam (surrendered); Syrian Salvation Government (surrendered)	Islamic State (since 10 July)

Commanders and leaders
Brig. Gen. Suheil al-Hassan (Tiger Forces); Col. Ghiath Dalla (42nd Armoured Brigade); Wajdi Abu Thalith (Former Omari Brigades commander, defected); Brig. Gen. "Abu Yaroub" Sami Fayiz al-Muhithawi †; Brig. Gen. Muhammad Naiouf; Brig. Gen. Rakan Diab †; Brig. Gen. Imad Adnan Ibrahim † (Republican Guard); Brig. Gen. Yusuf Mohammad Ali †(Republican Guard); Brig. Gen. Kamal Sarim (WIA); Major Duraid Awad; Ali Taha (Taha Group); Col. Shady Agha (Liwa al-Quds); Maher Ajeeb Jazza (Liwa Abu al-Fadhal al-Abbas); Haidar al Jubouri (Liwa Zulfiqar); Sheikh Abu Mu'annis Nabil Saymu'a † (Rocks of Urman Battalion)	Muhammad Majid al-Khatib (Alwiya al-Furqan) (surrendered) "Abu Hatem" Rakan al-Khadir (Army of Free Tribes) (surrendered); Abu Ayham (Army of Free Tribes) (surrendered); Ahmad al-Awda (Youth of Sunna Forces) (surrendered) "Abu Qusay" Adham al-Akrad (surrendered); Abu Omar al-Zagloul (Lions of Sunna Brigade) (surrendered); Adnan Al Masalmeh (surrendered); Abu Hussian Jelin (Mu'tazz Billah Army) (surrendered); Abu Hamza Tarbash (Army of the Revolution) (surrendered)	Mohammad al-Refai †(Top commander in Southern Syria)

Units involved
Syrian Armed Forces; Syrian Army; Special Forces; Tiger Forces; Taha Group; Raqqa Hawks; 14th Special Forces Division; 15th Special Forces Division; 4th Armoured Division; 42nd Armoured Brigade; Republican Guard; 1st Corps; 7th Infantry Division; 9th Armoured Division; 5th Corps; Al-Tawhid Brigade remnants; National Defense Force; Quneitra Hawks Brigade; Syrian Air Force; Russian Armed Forces; Aerospace Forces; Iraqi Shiite militias; Liwa Zulfiqar; Hezbollah special forces (rebel claim): Iran; IRGC; Eagles of the Whirlwind; Druze militias; Men of Dignity; Al-Jabal Brigade; Rocks of Urman Battalion	Free Syrian Army; Southern Front; (Syrian opposition) Army of the Revolution; Mu'tazz Billah Army; (Syrian opposition) Youth of Sunna Forces; (Syrian opposition) Army of Free Tribes; Alwiya al-Furqan; Lions of Sunna Brigade; (Syrian opposition) Central Operations Room in the South; Al-Bunyan al-Marsous Operations Room; Close Ranks Operations Room; Triangle of Death Operations Room; Repel the Aggressors Operations Room; Repel the Invaders Operations Room; Al-Hara Military Council; Tasil Military Council; Swords of Truth Room; Liwa Ahrar Qita; Manifest Victory Operations Room; Gathering of Revolutionaries of Mahajah; Ahrar al-Sham; Liwa Omar al-Mukhtar; Liwa Muhammad ibn Abdullah; Liwa al-Fatah; SSG; Hay'at Tahrir al-Sham	Military of ISIL; Khalid ibn al-Walid Army

Strength
40,000	30,000; Several hundred	1,200–2,400+

Casualties and losses
309 killed	205 killed	310 killed, 150–200 captured
- 236 civilians killed

The 2018 Southern Syria offensive, code-named Operation Basalt (Arabic: عملية البازلت), was a military operation launched by the Syrian Arab Army (SAA) and its allies against the rebels and ISIL in Southern Syria. The fighting began with a surprise attack on rebel-held areas in the eastern part of the Daraa Governorate in an attempt to fracture rebel-held lines and weaken morale, ahead of their offensive in the greater Southern Syria region.

== Background ==
Situation in southern Syria, before the operation

Daraa city is known as 'the cradle of the revolution', as the torture and murder of youths from Daraa had been one of the defining events that led to a growth of the protest movement against the Assad government in 2011. Thus, analysts have said that its capture by the government would be a key symbolic victory over the rebels, consolidating the government's power in the south of Syria. An estimated 750,000 civilians lived in the region prior to the outbreak of fighting, according to the United Nations (UN).

The offensive was launched in one of the de-escalation (safe) zones agreed upon by Russia, Turkey, and Iran in May 2017. In July that year, the U.S., Russia, and Jordan announced an agreement they had reached for a cease-fire in the areas of Daraa, Quneitra and Sweida. Washington then reportedly promised a robust response to any campaign that violated the agreement. However, US forces took no action to stop the assault.

To ease Israeli concerns and prevent possible Israeli intervention, Russia and Israel reached an agreement prior to the offensive that Iranian-backed forces would not aid the Syrian government with the attack on Daraa, and the US government warned rebel forces that they could not expect military support.

== Offensive ==
=== Capture of al-Lajat ===
On 18 June, during the night, the Syrian Army captured several farms near Busra Al-Harir and Masekah. Government forces also attacked the rebel-held towns of Busra Al-Sham, Eastern Ghariyah, and Western Ghariyah. The attacks were focused on rebel fortifications inside the towns. It was also reported that the first phase of the government's offensive in Daraa would focus on Eastern Daraa and capturing the Nasib Border Crossing. While the Syrian Army launched their attacks, rebel forces attempted to push back against the offensive by pushing into the Suwayda Governorate but they were repelled.

On 19 June, the rebels shelled the city of As-Suwayda in response to the government's attacks on their positions, while the Syrian Army simultaneously had another offensive active against ISIL in the northeastern part of the Suwayda Governorate. Meanwhile, the Syrian Army shelled half a dozen villages outside Daraa city.

Early in the morning on 20 June, the Syrian Army, led by the Tiger Forces, began using heavy artillery and missiles to attempt to take the town of Busra Al-Harir, after capturing a nearby air defense base. Later on the same day, government troops reportedly captured two villages and cut-off the rebel-held al-Lajat region, although the rebels denied this. Subsequently, the Syrian Army's artillery struck many villages.

On 21 June, during the middle of the night, the Syrian Air Force conducted an air raid in the area specifically targeting an Ahrar al-Sham base near Al-Hirak killing 10 fighters from the group. The air raid also targeted almost half a dozen other towns and villages. Along with aerial bombardment, the military also used surface-to-surface missiles and artillery on the villages. The Syrian Army also reportedly cut off rebel supply lines in the area. With government forces firing missiles into rebel-held areas and making excessive gains, the rebels fired missiles into Suwayda in retaliation to the government's offensive.

On 22 June, because of the increased fighting along the Jordan–Syria border, the Jordanian Army was deployed across Jordan's northern border with Syria. Pro-opposition sources reported that government forces had dropped 12 barrel bombs on Busra al-Harir and surrounding towns, while pro-government sources reported that the Syrian Army fired 30 missiles into Busra Al-Sham, Busra Al-Harir, and Al-Karak. On 23 June, after losing five towns, the rebels attacked government-held positions in Daraa itself. The attack included the use of missiles.

On 24 June, Russian military jets provided air cover for the offensive for the first time; the Syrian Network for Human Rights and the Union of Medical Care and Relief Organisations reported pro-government strikes on a medical facility in Busra al-Harir. Pro-government sources reported that rebel forces managed to infiltrate government-held checkpoints inside the Suwayda Governorate, but were later repelled. On the next day, the Syrian Army captured 400 km^{2} of territory, including the whole of the al-Lajat area.

=== Rapid government gains ===
On 26 June, the Syrian Army took control of Busra al-Harir after the Tiger Forces attacked the town on multiple axes and broke through rebel lines defending the city. During the clashes, a Syrian Brigadier General was killed. Later in the morning of the same day, Syrian Government forces captured two other towns, with rebel fighters withdrawing to Al-Hirak. A rebel counter-attack during the night of 26 June partially reversed the Syrian Army's gains; however, by the early hours of 27 June, the Syrian Army had fully re-established control, pushing forward to capture three more villages and thus reaching the eastern outskirts of Al-Hirak. By this point, the World Food Programme reported that close to 50,000 people had fled their homes in northern Daraa in a week to escape bombs, sheltering in makeshift camps in the south of the governorate and in Quneitra governorate.

27–28 June saw particularly heavy civilian casualties, with the Syrian Observatory for Human Rights (SOHR) recording 46 dead in two days in the shelling of Bosra al-Sham and other towns. On 27 June, the SAA seized the Brigade 52 Base, as well as a village south of it. Later in the day, government sources said eight locations were deserted or surrendered by rebel forces in sequence, including Al-Hirak and two bases, although the SOHR said that fighting continued in Al-Hirak. Two days later, government sources reported that some rebel groups and leaders in the southern part of the Daraa province in towns such as Tafas, Da'el, Ibta, Al-Karak, Al-Jay'lah, east of Daraa city agreed to surrender to the Syrian government. The Syrian Army also reportedly captured three other locations from rebel factions.

On 30 June, pro-rebel sources reported that as a result of shelling by pro-government forces the Roman Theatre at Bosra suffered significant damage, having already been hit by Russian airstrikes on 28 June. Between 30 June and 1 July, the Army took control of 13 rebel-held towns, including Bosra al-Sham, after surrender agreements were reached with rebel forces in the area. This extended the government's control to some 60 percent of the province. By this time, the UN estimated the number of internally displaced civilians at over 160,000 and the Syrian Network for Human Rights reported that over 214 civilians had been killed, including 65 children and 43 women, and that the government and its allies had used 258 surface-to-surface rockets, 293 artillery shells, and at least 397 barrel bombs in the first 15 days of the offensive.

=== Push towards the Jordanian border ===
Between 1 and 4 July, the Syrian Army made three unsuccessful attempts to push towards the Nasib Border Crossing, each time being repelled by the rebels. During the fighting, pro-government sources reported that the Army did not have much Russian air support due to the ongoing Russian negotiations with the rebels. However, Syrian warplanes reportedly bombarded Tafas on 1 July, as Republican Guard and Liwa Abu al-Fadl al-Abbas fighters advanced on the ground towards it.

On 2 July, the UN estimated that 270,000 civilians were displaced by the fighting, including 70,000 seeking shelter on the Jordanian border but blocked from entering the country. The civilian half of the opposition's delegation to peace talks withdrew from talks with the government and Russia. The next day, while the offensive was halted, an explosion occurred at a warehouse used by Hezbollah and other Iranian-backed militias in the northern part of the Daraa Governorate along a road between Damascus and Daraa. Several media outlets accused the IDF of carrying out an attack on the facility, but no comment was made by the Israeli Government, and the Syrian Observatory for Human Rights was also unable to verify the cause of the explosion. By 4 July, humanitarian agencies said eight hospitals had been bombed since the offensive began, with six medical workers killed, and in total more than 210 civilians killed and 500 injured. Meanwhile, the ISIL-affiliated Khalid ibn al-Walid Army launched an attack against pro-government forces in the village of Sheikh Maskin resulting in the death of several National Defense Force militiamen.

On 3 July, after the failure of previous rounds, negotiations re-opened with Jordanian mediation between Russia and rebel factions.

The following day, the Syrian Army captured the town of Saida, bringing them about six kilometers from the Nasib Border Crossing. The advance came after about 600 airstrikes were conducted in the province over the previous 15 hours. Eventually, the bombardment lasted a total of 22 hours, within which 870 airstrikes and 1,400 rocket and artillery strikes were conducted. Later in the day, the Army captured half a dozen other towns and five border points after launching an attack south of Busra Al-Sham. The advance cleared 230 square kilometers of territory along the border and brought back government troops on the Jordanian frontier for the first time since 2015. That night, between 5 and 6 July, the Syrian Army also seized Al-Naimah, the last town east of Daraa city.

On 6 July, the Syrian Army was closing in on Nasib, coming within three kilometers of the border crossing. The Army was advancing towards the crossing on two axes, squeezing rebel forces. A military source predicted that the crossing might "fall within a few hours". Soon after, the crossing was seized and the following day soldiers celebrated the capture as troops fanned out across towns and villages in the area. With control being established over the Damascus-Amman highway, the Syrian Army started setting up checkpoints and removing roadblocks along the highway.

On 7 July, Syrian official state media and rebels reported that a ceasefire had been signed by rebel groups to hand over weapons, and that those who rejected the agreement would be transported to Idlib.

=== Encircling and capture of Daraa city ===
Situation in Daraa city, 9 July 2018

On 8 July, the Syrian Army began mustering troops for the capture of Daraa city. With several rebel groups surrendering to the government, 11 rebel groups formed the Army of the South to continue fighting the Syrian government and their allies in the south. The group rejected surrendering to the government and vowed to continue fighting for the opposition's cause. The Russian and Syrian air forces conducted 72 airstrikes starting at dawn. The strikes were reportedly conducted after rebels fired on a military convoy on the highway, near Um al-Mayazeen. The Syrian Army then started an assault on Um al-Mayazeen. The fighting postponed the rebels' evacuation.

In an interview with a representative of the Syrian Army Tiger Forces' Taha Regiment conducted by regional expert Aymenn Jawad Al-Tamimi, the representative described the offensive as intense as the rebels were well-fortified and well-armed. He also stated that many villages captured by the government had rejected Russian-backed reconciliation agreements and that the village of Jabib betrayed a cease-fire agreement, leading to the death of several soldiers in the village. The representative also confirmed that Russia's involvement and support in the offensive was essential to the government's offensive, even more so than Iran's involvement.

On 10 July, it was reported that around 4,000 people fled towards Israeli-controlled territory from the pocket of the province held by ISIL-affiliated Khalid ibn al-Walid Army, expecting a government assault. Later that day, ISIL carried out an SVBIED attack on government forces in the village of Zayzun in western Daraa, claiming that the attack killed more than 35 pro-government fighters. However, pro-opposition activists reported the death toll to be 14 and that it also included recently reconciled rebels.

On 11 July, pro-government media reported that the Syrian Air Force provided air support to the FSA in clashes against Khalid ibn al-Walid Army in the town of Hayt in the Yarmouk Basin, and opposition sources reported that Russian planes and government helicopters targeted Khalid ibn al-Walid Army-held Saham al-Golan, the latter dropping barrel bombs. The next day, the ISIL affiliate took control of Hayt from the FSA. Meanwhile, the government reported a deal had been concluded for rebels to hand over southern Daraa City to government forces; Russian military police and government officers entered the city with journalists to raise the government flag, although rebel fighters remained in the city.

By this time in the offensive, the government had captured 84% of the territory in the Daraa Governorate, and since the surrender agreements between the government and rebel forces, reports had emerged of pro-government militiamen looting property and stealing from locals in reconciled towns - with Russian military police ignoring and turning a blind eye to it.

=== Push into Quneitra and rebel surrender ===
On 15 July, the Syrian Army bombarded Tahrir al-Sham positions in western Daraa, and the Army's Tiger Forces attempted to attack Tahrir al-Sham positions but were repelled. According to government sources, Tahrir al-Sham refused to surrender the area, while the Syrian government stated they were not willing to allow Tahrir al-Sham fighters to reconcile like other rebel groups in the area, but they were offering to deport their fighters to northern Syria. However, Tahrir al-Sham refused this offer and continued to fight. The Syrian Air Force also targeted the rebel-held towns of Al-Harrah and Kafr Nasij in the northwestern part of the Daraa province. According to the Syrian Army, they called on the FSA and residents of the town of Al-Harra and its corresponding hilltop, which they considered a strategic point, to expel HTS from the area; HTS also arrested and killed several opposition members that had surrendered to the government, as well as those whom were attempting to do so. On the same day, the first round of rebels and their families (around 400-500 individuals) to be deported to northern Syria departed from Daraa city. By this point, Reuters, the World Health Organization and UNICEF reported the government controlled 80% of Daraa province, and that over 160,000 residents displaced by the offensive on Daraa were trapped in Quneitra.

Syrian Army troops pushed into Quneitra Governorate that day, with the Russian and Syrian air forces conducting over 25 airstrikes on the village of Masahara, 11 km from the Golan frontier. Syrian Army and Iranian forces reportedly fired over 800 rockets into rebel-held areas in the Quneitra Governorate, and they also targeted a rebel supply line between Daraa and Quneitra. The Syrian Army along with the National Defense Forces paramilitary group attacked the village of Masharah along the border with the Golan Heights, which they said was controlled by Tahrir al-Sham and its allies, and captured the village. However, a rebel official in Quneitra denied government forces had captured the village and said fighting continued.

On 16 July, the Syrian Army continued shelling western Daraa, with the SOHR estimating that 230 shells hit the area, adding that barrel bombs had been deployed as well. On the same day, the Syrian Army captured the towns of Al-Harra, Al-Nimr, five villages and several hills including the strategic hilltop of Tell al-Harra. After those advances the Syrian Army expanded their control to about 90% of Daraa Province.

On 17 July, Syrian Army shelling led to significant casualties across the area. Opposition sources and the UN reported that a Syrian Air Force jet targeted Ain al-Tana town in Quneitra, striking a school building sheltering displaced persons, killing six civilians including three children and injuring several others. The UN and the NGO Action on Armed Violence also reported Syrian Air Force bombing of Nawa town and surrounding villages that left at least 14 dead and 150 injured, with the World Health Organization reporting that an airstrike hit and damaged Nawa's hospital, one of the only functioning health facilities in the area. An FSA commander told pro-opposition media that rebels continued to repel the pro-government attack on Mashara. On 18 July, Reporters Without Borders called on the UN to protect reporters at risk due to pro-government advances in the area, reporting 69 journalists in grave danger in Quneitra and Daraa. From 17 to 19 July, the UN reported government air and ground-based strikes on Tasil, Nawa and Ash Shaykh Sa'd in western Daraa, and on Nabe'a Al Sakher in Quneitra governorate. The number of displaced people fluctuated: the UN reported that following these heightened hostilities in Quneitra, IDP numbers had increased to 203,500 individuals, including 45–80,000 newly displaced by the fighting of 17–19 July, as well as people displaced by fighting in ISIL-controlled Yarmouk valley.

On 20 July, rebel fighters in the Quneitra Governorate began departing for Idlib after an evacuation agreement was made with the Syrian government, allowing the Syrian Army and allied forces to take control of multiple villages. At about the same time, the plan was being finalized for evacuating several hundred members of the civil defense group known as the White Helmets from areas near the Israeli-occupied Golan Heights and into Jordan. The operation was carried out by the Israel Defense Forces on 22 July 2018; however some 300 White Helmets failed to be evacuated as they were trapped by intense fighting between the Syrian Army and ISIL.

=== Assault on the ISIL pocket ===
Assault on the ISIL-held pocket, 23–30 July 2018

On 21 July 2018, the Syrian Army began their assault on the ISIL-held pocket in the southwest Daraa Province, capturing the Tell al-Jumou hilltop to the southwest of Nawa, and also advancing near the town of Jallin, capturing Tell Ashtara and other nearby areas. ISIL claimed to have killed 25 fighters from the Syrian Army and Syrian opposition in the clashes, and also claimed to capture some villages. Early on the next day, the Syrian army advanced into the village of Jallin.

On 25 July, a series of suicide bombings and raids were carried out by ISIL, targeting civilians in villages and towns in around Suweida, a mainly Druze area under nominal government control but functionally autonomous, with a death toll of up to 255 reported.

On 26 July, according to the Israel Defense Forces, a Syrian Su-22 jet was shot down by IDF Patriot missiles after the jet was monitored flying around two kilometres (1.2 miles) into Israel. The pilot, Colonel Umran Mare, was killed and the plane crashed in an area on the Syrian side of the border.

On 31 July, the Syrian Army fully captured the remainder of the ISIL-held pocket in the Yarmouk Basin. Around that time, it was reported that 150-200 ISIL militants had surrendered to the Syrian Army. After the surrender of ISIL forces on 31 July, there were reports that former Daraa FSA fighters who reconciled with the Syrian government and joined the Syrian Army in Yarmouk basin offensive executed dozens of captured fighters of the Khalid Ibn al-Walid army on the same day.

== Reactions ==
Supranational

- United Nations – The OCHA stated that the UN was "concerned about reports of an escalation of violence in Daraa... which is endangering civilians and causing hundreds of families to become displaced." UN special envoy for Syria Staffan de Mistura warned the offensive by the Syrian Army and Iranian militias would cause a humanitarian disaster and put the lives of over 750,000 people at risk, also stating that more than 45,000 had already been displaced. António Guterres made a statement saying "calls for an immediate halt to the current military escalation and urges all stakeholders to respect their international obligations including the protection of civilians and civilian infrastructure."
- EU – The European Union condemned the violation of the cease-fire zone established in Daraa by the Astana agreement and called on the Syrian Government and their allies to stop the hostilities in Daraa in order to avoid a humanitarian crisis. On 4 July, spokeswoman for the European Union Maja Kocijancic in a written statement said, "Such attacks are clear violations of international law and international humanitarian law that also put at risk any progress in Geneva for the resumption of the political talks under U.N. mediation," and she added, "The renewed violence can also have serious repercussions for the security of neighboring countries, possibly leading to new waves of refugees and internally displaced people."

State

- United States – The American Envoy to the UN, Nikki Haley said regarding recent clashes, "The Syrian regime's violations of the ceasefire in southwest Syria need to stop," while also saying, "Russia will ultimately bear responsibility for any further escalations in Syria." After the beginning of the offensive, a letter sent to rebel leadership stated that they "We are fully aware that you have to make your decision according to your interests and the interests of your families and faction as you view them, and you must not base your decision on the assumption or an expectation of a military intervention from our side." The letter also said "We, in the government of the United States of America, understand the hardships that you are facing now, and we are still advising the Russians and the Syrian regime as not to undertake any military action that violates the "de-escalation" agreement in the southwestern part of Syria."
- Saudi Arabia – Saudi Arabia's permanent delegate to the United Nations Dr. Fahd Al-Mutairi said about the offensive, "Despite urgent appeals and UN resolutions calling for opening of humanitarian corridors and delivering of aid to the needy and affected, the Syrian regime and its allies are continuing their military operations, siege and displacement of innocent civilians in total violation of these resolutions."
- Vatican – Pope Francis condemned the Syrian military's offensive in Daraa, saying, "the military actions of recent days have struck even schools and hospitals and triggered thousands of new refugees."
- Turkey – Turkish foreign minister Mevlüt Çavuşoğlu said the United States, Russia and Iran were responsible for the violations committed by the Syrian Government, the Turkish spokesman for the foreign ministry said regarding the situation, "We strongly condemn these inhuman attacks by the regime on innocent people." He also added, "These attacks hinder the efforts in Astana and (the UN-supported process in) Geneva to reduce violence on the ground and to find a political solution for the crisis," Turkish officials have stated they are not responsible for upholding agreements made in Daraa but if pro-government forces including Iranian militias and Russian forces attack the Idlib Governorate the Turkish military will uphold the de-escalation agreement and retaliate to violations. Turkish President Recep Tayyip Erdoğan told Russian President Vladimir Putin in response to reports emerging of a planned offensive in Idlib after the campaign in Daraa, that the Astana Accord could be completely destroyed, Erdoğan also commented on the targeting of civilians in Daraa.
- Israel – An Israeli defense official stated that the Israeli military will attack any Syrian forces that enter the UN cease-fire zone in the Golan Heights, the official also said about an agreement with the Russian Government, "The agreement is the basis for any future security reality after Assad returns to [Israel's] northern border," Before departing to meet Russian officials, Israeli Prime Minister Benjamin Netanyahu said, "Israel has no problem with Assad, but cease-fire agreements must be upheld."
- Iran – Hossein Salami, an IRGC commander, said in a speech that there will be the creation of an "Islamic Army" that will end Israel and invade the Golan Heights.

Domestic

- Tahrir al-Sham – The group released a statement condemning Free Syrian Army groups that made deals with Russia to surrender contested ground in the area; the group also called on all rebel groups in the south to unite and fight as a unified force against the Syrian Government and their allies, and also claimed that they (HTS and their allies) would be victorious.
- Guardians of Religion Organization – The organization released a statement regarding the clashes in Daraa, urging Muslims to donate money, and for media platforms to raise awareness to the situation as well as encouraging the opposition factions in Daraa to fight the Syrian military in their advance in the area, the statement also described the importance of defending the region for the rebels saying it's a gateway to the other rebel held areas in the South.
- Syrian opposition – Various armed opposition groups have condemned the offensive and demanded more international action to halt it. Nasr al-Hariri, an opposition negotiator, has condemned the lack of action or intervention by the United States and claimed the only explanation to their lack of action is because of what he described as a malicious deal. In response to the Youth of Sunna Forces surrendering to the Syrian government, by negotiating with Russian officials, two Free Syrian Army Generals condemned the negotiations and described it as treason, stating they were withdrawing from them.
- Caucasus Emirate – The group's branch in Syria released a statement saying the offensive was no different from the one in Eastern Ghouta, and that the offensive is being orchestrated by the Alawite clan of Assad and "Russian Atheists" to wipe out and displace Sunni Muslims in Syria.
- Khalid ibn al-Walid Army – A statement from the group said the following about the situation and cooperating with other groups against pro-government forces: "The factions and apostates have been invited to repent and give allegiance to the Islamic State after disavowing their kufr [disbelief] and their loyalty to the disbelievers. There is no truth to the news circulated through rooms and social media pages about Jaysh Khalid bin al-Waleed entering and taking up fronts within the areas of the apostates to fight the Nusayris in them, and in the event an area is entered it will be under the authority of the Caliphate entirely, with no presence for the apostates in them by God's permission. We remind you it is forbidden to contact the apostates except after coordinating with the contact official (Abu Abdo al-Askari) and taking permission in that and within Shari'i regulations, and the one who engages in contact in an individual capacity without coordinating with the contact official will be reprimanded. We ask God Almighty to help us and you to obey Him." The group also published another statement that called on displaced individuals in Southern Syria to migrate to the areas of the Yarmouk Basin under their control.
- Rojava – In the aftermath of the offensive in Southern Syria and talks of a potential operation in the Idlib Governorate officials from Rojava stated they would be willing to cooperate with Russia, Iran, and the Syrian government against opposition and Turkish forces in Idlib they also stated they wished to cooperate with the Syrian government as well as Iran and Russia to retake Afrin.

Other involved parties

- Hezbollah – The Secretary general of Hezbollah, Hassan Nasrallah, hailed the offensive as a "major victory". In response to pressure put on the group including demands to withdraw from Syria by Russian Foreign Minister Sergey Lavrov, Hassan Nasrallah stated that the only way Hezbollah would withdraw from Syria would be if the Syrian Government asked them to leave and said in response to the demands, "I will tell you that if the whole world comes together to force us to leave Syria, they will not be able to evict us."
- Islamic State of Iraq and the Levant – In response to the Syrian government refusing to deport ISIL fighters to the deserts of Eastern Syria, ISIL carried out a large-scale attack in Al-Suwayda, capturing several Druze women and threatened to kill them unless the Syrian government halted the offensive in Daraa.

== Aftermath ==
By mid-August 2018, Russia set up four Russian military police-guarded posts along the Bravo line of the buffer zone in the Golan Heights, with two more planned.

Groups that reconciled with the Syrian government "turned over [their] heavy weapons", but they retained their "light weapons."

In December 2018 SAA forces allegedly seized United States-made weapons in Daraa after local citizens informed the army of weapons caches left behind by the rebels, with Sputnik News releasing footage.

On 1 March 2020, the March 2020 Daraa clashes begin.

== See also ==
- As-Suwayda offensive (June 2018)
- 2018 As-Suwayda attacks
- Southern Damascus offensive (April–May 2018)
- 2015 Southern Syria offensive
- As-Suwayda offensive (August–November 2018)
