= 6th Armored Division (Syria) =

- الفرقة المدرعة السادسة
- Active: 2015–2024
- Country: Ba'athist Syria (surrendered)
- Allegiance: Syrian Arab Armed Forces (surrendered)
- Branch: Syrian Arab Army (surrendered)
- Type: Armoured division
- Role: Armoured warfare
- Size: up to 15,000 soldiers (2019)
- Part of: 1st Corps (surrendered)
- Garrison/HQ: Latakia
- Nickname: "Death Brigade" (76th Brigade)
- Engagements: Syrian Civil War; Northwestern Syria offensive (October–November 2015); 2015–2016 Latakia offensive; 2016 Latakia offensive; Operation Dawn of Idlib

Commanders
- Current Commander: Maj. Gen. Haitham Assaf

The 6th Armored Division (Arabic: الفرقة المدرعة السادسة) was a formation of the Syrian Army responsible for securing the northeastern approach to Latakia. The division was part of the Syrian Army's 1st Corps prior to the fall of Ba'athist Syria.

== Command structure ==
6th Armored Division (2022)

- 76th Armored Brigade
- 85th Armored Brigade
- 88th Armored Brigade
- 55th Mechanized Brigade
- 45th Special Forces Regiment

== Combat history ==
=== 4th Corps (2015–2018) ===
Two new corps have been established since the civil war began in 2011. In October 2015, the 4th Assault Army Corps (Arabic: 4 فيلق اقتحام), or "4th Volunteer Assault Corps" also called the Fourth Legion, was established in the northeast. The 4th Corps was a new formation of the Syrian Army, organized with Russian help. The original plan for the unit was to reorganize the weakened regular army units as well as irregular pro-government militias, including some National Defence Forces (NDF) units, in the governorates of Latakia as well as Tartus, and on the al-Ghab Plain. These forces would be trained, organized and armed by the Russian Armed Forces, so that they could become "special" ground forces which would retake northwestern Syria with Russian air support.

When the 4th Corps was subsequently organized in fall 2015, forces of widely different origins were included: the 103rd Republican Guard Brigade which would serve as HQ for the new corps, along with troops drawn from the 3rd and 4th Divisions, as well as Ba'ath Party, NDF, and Alawite militias. The Alawite fighters were organized into 12 units which fought under the joint command of Russian, Syrian, and Iranian officers. The remained units were grouped into four volunteer brigades, while several smaller Russian units were assigned to it in a support role. Directly paid by the Republican Guard and the government, the 4th Corps was described by Carnegie Middle East Center's expert Kheder Khaddour a formation that "blends army and militia forces".

Although the 4th Corps' initial operations such as during the 2015–16 Latakia offensive and Northwestern Syria offensive (October–November 2015) were relatively successful, the inclusion of more militias into the corps remained elusive. This was probably due to the fact that Iran remained unwilling to allow Syrian units under its control to be integrated to a primarily Russian-led formation, while many militias generally resisted any attempts to reduce their autonomy by including them in the 4th Corps. As a result, the 4th Corps remained mostly limited to Latakia, where it continued to be active. As its performance during the 2016 Latakia offensive was lacking, however, its overall commander Maj. Gen. Shuqi Yusuf was dismissed in July 2016.

Overall, the 4th Corps did not "live up to Moscow's expectations" and failed, because its Syrian commanders "demonstrated poor performance", despite the fact that the corps had actually succeeded in reforming the included militias into a "disciplined, organized military force". Gregory Waters wrote via Twitter in November 2018 that: "..the 6th Division [was] one of two divisions created under the Russian-built 4th Corps back in 2015. The 4th Corps project largely failed & the 6th & 2nd Divisions have remained in Latakia since."

=== After the 4th Corps (2018–present) ===
The 45th Special Forces Regiment, formerly an independent unit under the command of the Special Forces branch of the SAA, was incorporated into the 6th Division by late 2018. The 45th Regiment had remained in Latakia after retreating from Jisr ash-Shughur in May 2015. Since 2019, the 6th Division was again reorganized into a regular military unit with additional armored and mechanized brigades (55th, 76th and 88th).

== See also ==
- 2nd Armored Division (Syria)
