= 2nd Armored Division (Syria) =

- الفرقة المدرعة الثانية
- Active: 2015–2024
- Country: Ba'athist Syria (surrendered)
- Allegiance: Syrian Armed Forces (surrendered)
- Branch: Syrian Arab Army (surrendered)
- Type: Armoured division
- Role: Armoured warfare
- Size: up to 10,000 soldiers (2019)
- Part of: 2nd Corps (surrendered)
- Garrison/HQ: Latakia
- Engagements: Syrian Civil War; Northwestern Syria offensive (October–November 2015); Homs offensive (November–December 2015); 2015–2016 Latakia offensive; 2016 Latakia offensive; Operation Dawn of Idlib

Commanders
- Current Commander: Maj. Gen. Rifaat Khalil
- Brigade Commanders: Brig. Gen. Gandhi Ibrahim (48th Regiment)

The 2nd Armored Division (Arabic: الفرقة المدرعة الثانية) was a formation of the Syrian Army responsible for securing the northwestern approach to Latakia. The division is part of the Syrian Army's 2nd Corps.

== Command structure ==
2nd Armored Division (2022)

- 144th Armored Brigade
- 145th Armored Brigade
- 73rd Infantry Brigade
- 48th Special Forces Regiment
- 53rd Special Forces Regiment
- 826th Coastal Regiment

== Combat history ==
=== 4th Corps (2015–2018) ===
2nd Division participated along the 6th Division of the 4th Corps in initial operations such as the 2015–16 Latakia offensive and Northwestern Syria offensive (October–November 2015). These operations were ultimately successful, but due to the fact that Iran remained unwilling to allow Syrian units under its control to be integrated to a primarily Russian-led formation, while many militias generally resisted any attempts to reduce their autonomy by including them in the 4th Corps, the project failed. As its performance during the 2016 Latakia offensive did not met expectations, the 4th Corps project failed and 2nd Division remained in Latakia.

=== After the 4th Corps (2018–2024) ===
Before 2018, personnel of the 2nd Division was drawn from members of the Syrian Army, its staff, and veterans or defectors without the need for recruitment campaigns. Since 2019, the 2nd Division incorporated reconciled civilians or ex-rebels from East Ghouta, Douma and Daraa. Since 2020, the 2nd Division was also reorganized into a regular military unit with additional armored brigade (145th), infantry brigade (73rd) and special forces regiments (48th, 53rd).

== See also ==
- 6th Armored Division (Syria)
