= Southern Damascus offensive (April–May 2018) =

Military operation

- Part of the Rif Dimashq Governorate campaign of the Syrian Civil War and Russian military intervention in the Syrian Civil War
- Map of the operation
Date	19 April – 21 May 2018 (1 month and 2 days)
Location	Yarmouk Camp, al-Hajar al-Aswad, Qadam, and Tadamon, southern Damascus, Damascus Governorate, Syria
Result	Syrian government victory: The Syrian Army captured the entire rebel-held pocket in south Damascus after reaching an evacuation agreement; After major advances the Syrian Army reaches an evacuation agreement with ISIL; Following ISIL's evacuation, the Syrian military fully took control of the capital and its nearby governorate after 6 years, successfully ending the Rif Dimashq Governorate campaign

Belligerents
(Syria) Syrian Arab Republic; Palestinian Syrian militias Hezbollah; Arab Nationalist Guard; Russia	Islamic State (surrendered); Wilayat Dimashq; Hay'at Tahrir al-Sham (surrendered); Jaysh al-Islam (surrendered); Aknaf Bait al-Maqdis (remnants) (surrendered)

Commanders and leaders
(Syria) Hassan Yusuf Mohammad †; Saed Abd Al-Aal (WIA) (Free Palestine Movement)	Unknown

Units involved
Syrian Armed Forces; Syrian Army; 4th Armoured Division; 42nd Brigade; National Shield; 7th Mechanized Division; 9th Armoured Division; Republican Guard; National Defence Forces; Palestinian Syrian militias; Palestine Liberation Army; PFLP–GC; Liwa al-Quds; Fatah al-Intifada; Galilee Forces; Free Palestine Movement; As-Sa'iqa; Palestinian Popular Struggle Front; Return Forces (Palestinian Hezbollah affiliate); Russian Armed Forces; Russian Air Force	Military of ISIL

Strength
Unknown	1,500–2,500

Casualties and losses
273 killed	233–350+ killed 19 killed 10 killed
- 73 civilians killed

The Southern Damascus offensive began on 19 April 2018 when the Syrian Arab Armed Forces began to clear an enclave held by the Islamic State (IS) in southern Damascus in the Yarmouk Camp.

== Background ==
In March 2018, ISIL massacred dozens of Syrian soldiers in an offensive for al-Qadam. On 14 April, ISIL then began an offensive on the western axis of the al-Qadam neighborhood and on 15 April, ISIL's forces in the Yarmouk Camp shelled areas held by the government. On the same day, the Syrian government began redeploying soldiers from East Ghouta to the area in an attempt to surround the camp.

== Offensive ==
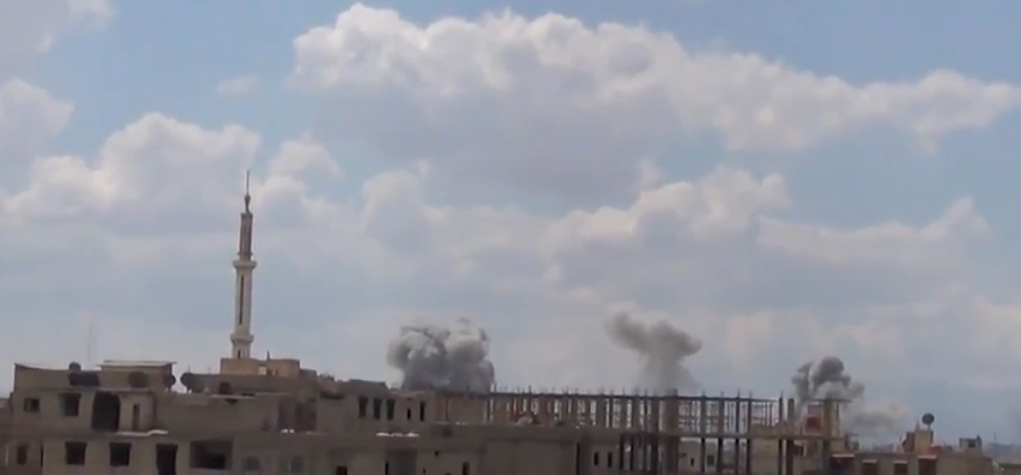
The Syrian Air Force bombs rebel positions in southern Damascus, April 2018

On 19 April, after a week of intermittent escalations, the Syrian Arab Army and allied Palestinian militias launched an offensive against the ISIL-held al-Hajar al-Aswad neighborhood and the Palestinian Yarmouk Camp. Barrages of missiles and artillery shells bombarded ISIL positions in the Yarmouk Camp, Qadam, and Tadamon districts of the ISIL pocket in more than 580 air raids, with local activists reporting at least 15 civilians killed and more than 100 wounded. The Russian air force also provided heavy support to the offensive. Following the barrages, the Syrian Army and allies stormed the western axis of al-Qadam. On 20 April, the army captured the Imam Ali mosque in Tadamon.

While state media and SOHR reported on 20 April that ISIL had agreed to surrender, fighting continued on 23 April. SOHR stated that some militants had rejected the agreement. On 22 April, it was reported that the Syrian army managed to capture Al-Zain neighborhood south of Al-Hajar Al-Aswad. The next day, two Army tanks were reportedly destroyed in the clashes which also left three pro-government Palestinian officers dead. On 24 April, the Syrian Army began dropping leaflets over Al-Hajar Al-Aswad, urging ISIL militants to surrender. The army had also reportedly entered the Joura district of al-Qadam, seizing some buildings and capturing the orchards.

The UNRWA reported around 5,000 Palestinians from Yarmouk were displaced to Yalda between 19 and 24 April, leaving 1,200 residents, although local sources reported 2,500 families or 3,000 people were still there. By 25 April, local sources said that at least 20 civilians had been killed. The UN described Yarmouk Camp as "transformed into a death camp", reporting thousands of homes and the last functioning hospital destroyed. The UK-based Action Group for Palestinians of Syria said 60% of the camp had been destroyed in the government offensive by 27 April.

Despite facing heavy ISIL resistance, pro-government forces continued to advance on multiple axes of the pocket. Led by Republican Guard units, the Syrian Army continued their advance in the Al-Ma’edhiyah subdistrict, seizing more buildings near the Al-Asali axis by 25 April. The ISIL-affiliated Amaq Agency reported on 26 April that their forces killed three elements of the Syrian Army, including a lieutenant. At the same time, government forces made limited gains in al-Hajar al-Aswad. While ISIL and SAA clashed, Tahrir al-Sham units repelled a separate SAA advance in the Yarmouk Camp. The following day, ISIL shelled parts of the al-Qadam district. The Syrian Army made additional advances in other areas in southern Damascus, 20 SAA soldiers were killed and 3 BMPs were damaged according to Amaq during the advances in al-Qadam. Another eight SAA soldiers were killed in advances in the al-Zayn neighborhood. On the same day, Syrian General Hassan Yusuf Mohammad was also killed in clashes in southern Damascus.

The Syrian Arab News Agency (SANA) reported on 28 April that the SAA had fully captured al-Qadam, Mazniyeh, Asali, and Jourah. On 29 April, SANA announced that an agreement was made to evacuate Syrian opposition fighters and family members from rebel-held areas east of Yarmouk. It also announced on 30 April that an agreement to evacuate civilians and fighters from Yarmouk was reached with HTS. Evacuations began later in the day and were completed by 1 May, bringing the 15% of Yarmouk that was held by HTS under government control.

On 3 May, the Syrian Army reported it had captured Munif Al-Anidi school and the cemetery in Hajar-Al Aswad, thus successfully splitting the ISIL-held pocket into two parts. The next day, Russian military police reportedly entered Beit Sahem as non-ISIL rebels continued evacuations from their previously held areas east of Yarmouk. On 5 May, the Syrian Army and the Palestinian militia groups said they had fully captured the southern district of al-Hajar al-Aswad. By 5 May, the Russian Ministry of Defence announced that the Syrian army controlled two-thirds of the camp.

Between 5 and 12 May, both sides suffered heavy casualties as government advances slowed due to ISIL militants being entrenched in tunnels and underground shelters. The militants had also conducted constant counter-attacks. Local sources reported pro-government airstrikes and artillery fire on Yarmouk camp and al-Hajar al-Aswad throughout 7 May, with the aim of separating the two neighbourhoods, with 500 meters of ground gained. Pro-government media reported the killing of Hezbollah's Muhammad Ahmad Hourani and wounding of war correspondent Wasim Aissa during clashes in Yarmouk.

On 16 May, a new pro-government assault on the camp with air strikes and surface-to-surface missiles, with only a few hundred, mainly elderly, residents left inside; dozens of civilians and over 100 fighters on both sides were reported killed. SOHR reported that the SAA fully captured al-Hajar-al-Aswad. On 19 May, Russian and pro-government sources reported a ceasefire between the government and ISIL, although this was denied by official government media, and busloads of ISIL fighters were reported to be evacuated by the government. Just after midnight on 20 May, buses entered the ISIL enclave to evacuate the ISIL fighters, while ISIL burned its bases in preparation for the withdrawal. Despite reports of some continuing clashes in the area, the first batch of militants and their family members was evacuated towards the eastern desert.

On 21 May, pro-government troops fully recaptured Yarmouk camp, as ISIL fighters pulled out to deserts east of the city, thus allowing the Syrian Arab Army to fully control the capital after 6 years.

== Aftermath ==
In the month of fighting, a total of at least 73 civilians were reported killed in Yarmouk, and 7,000 people — including 6,200 Palestinians — displaced from their homes. An UNRWA spokesman said 100 to 200 civilians were estimated to still be in Yarmouk. Sheikh Mohammed al-Omari, a cleric loyal to the government, condemned government troops and allied militias for looting homes in the captured neighbourhood. According to The Economist, many Palestinians believe the government plans to redevelop Yarmouk for use by Syrians.

== See also ==
- As-Suwayda offensive (June 2018)
- As-Suwayda offensive (August–November 2018)
- Eastern Syria campaign (September–December 2017)
