= Deir ez-Zor offensive (2018) =

Military operation

- Part of the Deir ez-Zor Governorate campaign of the Syrian civil war and spillover of the ISIL insurgency in Iraq (2017–present)
Date	22 May – 11 June 2018 (2 weeks and 6 days)
Location	Deir ez-Zor Governorate, Syria
Result	Syrian government and allies victory
Territorial changes	Syrian Army repels all ISIL attacks on Abu Kamal

Belligerents
Islamic State	(Syria) Syrian Arab Republic; Russia; Iran; Hezbollah; Iraq

Commanders and leaders
Abu Bakr al-Baghdadi	(Syria) Gen. Ali Muhammad al-Hussein † "Abu Hussian" Haj Nasser Jamil Hadraj †

Units involved
Military of ISIL	Syrian Armed Forces: Syrian Army; 11th Tank Division; 9th Division; Republican Guard; 5th Corps (since 18 June); Local Defence Forces; Lions of Hussein; National Defence Forces (since 18 June); Syrian Air Force; Russian Armed Forces: 29th Army; 200th Artillery Brigade; Wagner Group; Hezbollah: Hezbollah Rocket Division; Iraqi Armed Forces: Popular Mobilization Forces

Strength
400 fighters (al-Shafa area)	Unknown

Casualties and losses
138 killed	246 killed

The Deir ez-Zor offensive (2018) was launched by the Islamic State against government-held areas throughout the Deir ez-Zor Governorate of Eastern Syria. During the offensive, on 8 June, ISIL managed to penetrate the city of Abu Kamal, capturing several parts of it.

== The offensive ==
=== Initial attacks and assault on the highway ===
On 22 May 2018, ISIL launched an attack, involving suicide bombers and armored vehicles, on a military outpost southeast of Palmyra and near the T-3 Pumping Station. Pro-opposition sources reported between 26 and 30 pro-government fighters were killed, including 17 non-Syrians, while the military denied the high death toll and put the number of dead at 16 soldiers. The next day, ISIL attacked a joint Syrian-Russian military convoy near the city of Mayadin. The ensuing clashes left 26 pro-Syrian government fighters, 5 Russian PMCs and 4 Russian regular soldiers dead. Russia reported 43 militants were also killed. Concurrently to the convoy attack, ISIL assaulted three Syrian military checkpoints in the same area. Three days later, two new ISIL attacks took place near Mayadin and Abu Kamal.

On 4 June, ISIL attacked government forces along a 100-kilometer front from Mayadin to Abu Kamal, capturing two or three towns on the western bank of the Euphrates. The militants attacked on two fronts, with ISIL fighters coming from both the desert, west of the Euphrates, and from their territory on the eastern bank of the river. A few days before the assault, around 400 ISIL fighters crossed the Euphrates from their enclave to the east following heavy shelling of government positions. The capture of the towns cut the Deir ez-Zor-Abu Kamal highway. The following day, pro-government forces recaptured the areas they had lost.

=== Attack on Abu Kamal ===
On 8 June, ISIL renewed its offensive and managed to break the Army's lines around Abu Kamal by using 10 suicide bombers, including several SVBIEDs. ISIL fighters managed to break into the city and fighting came close to the city center. The attack once again cut the highway. However, soon the Army launched a counter-attack and by the following day it was reported that the military managed to re-secure the city. During the fighting, the commander of the Syrian Army's 11th Tank Division, General Ali Muhammad al-Hussein, was killed in clashes on the outskirts of Abu Kamal. The commander of Hezbollah's Rocket Division was also killed. On 10 June, ISIL's offensive against Abu Kamal was still continuing, before the militants withdrew from the city on 11 June.

== Aftermath ==
On 17 June, it was reported by Al-Masdar News that ISIL launched a surprise attack on government forces around the T3 pumping station in the Syrian Desert destroying one tank and killing several government soldiers. The next day, government reinforcements from the Republican Guard, National Defense Forces, and Liwa Fatemiyoun as well as additional Hezbollah fighters, were sent in preparation for a new military operation against ISIL in the region.

On 18 June, the Israeli Air Force carried out an airstrike targeting the Iraqi Popular Mobilization Forces as well as Hezbollah and the Iranian Revolutionary Guard Corps in the area, resulting in the death of 52. The airstrike was initially blamed on the United States and the CJTF-OIR coalition by several Iranian-linked militias including PMF, but this was denied by both the United States and CJTF-OIR; it was later discovered that it was in fact carried out by Israel.

== See also ==
- 2018 Southern Syria offensive
- As-Suwayda offensive (June 2018)
- Deir ez-Zor campaign (2017–2019)
- Eastern Syria campaign (September–December 2017)
