= Battle of Al-Shaykh Maskin (2015–2016) =

Military operation

Coordinates: 32.8270°N 36.1612°E

- Part of the Daraa Governorate campaign of the Syrian Civil War
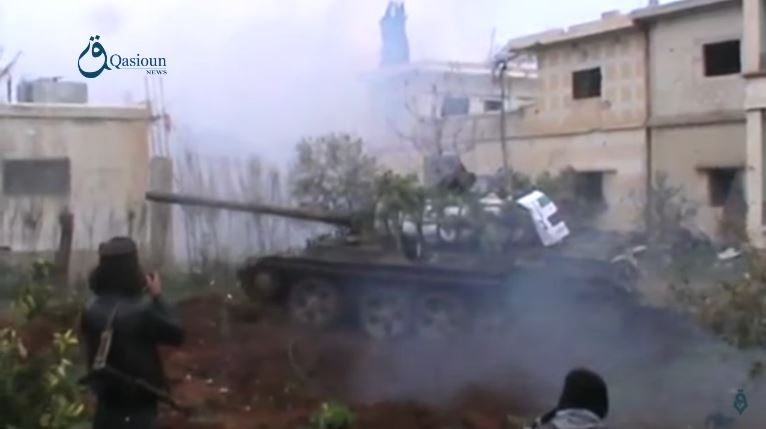
- Southern Front tank during the battle.
Date	27 December 2015 – 25 January 2016 (4 weeks and 1 day)
Location	Al-Shaykh Maskin, Daraa Governorate, Syria
Result	Syrian Army victory
Territorial changes	The Army captures Al-Shaykh Maskin town and the Brigade 82 base

Belligerents
Free Syrian Army; Al-Nusra Front	(Syria) Syrian Arab Republic: Syrian Armed Forces; National Defense Force; Hezbollah; Palestine Liberation Army; Russia: Russian Air Force

Commanders and leaders
Unknown; Abu Mohammad Al-Hafizh †	Brig. Gen. Samir Uasilya; Mohammed Fares (WIA)

Units involved
Southern Front: 19th Brigade	5th Armoured Division: 15th Mechanized Brigade; 7th Armored Division 15th Special Forces Division

Strength
2,500	Unknown

Casualties and losses
210 killed, 250+ wounded	98 killed

The Battle of Al-Shaykh Maskin was an offensive by the Syrian Army to capture the town of Al-Shaykh Maskin in the Daraa Governorate and secure the Daraa–Damascus highway.

== Background ==
In November 2014, rebels had defeated a government attempt to recapture Al-Shaykh Maskin and had taken control of the strategically important part of the western countryside of Daraa, cutting crucial government supply lines and unseating government fighters from Brigade 82, one of its biggest bases.

== The battle ==
=== Brigade 82 captured and town stormed ===
Map of the battle for Shaykh Maskin

Early on 27 December, the 15th Brigade of the 5th Armoured Division of the Syrian Army launched the operation to capture Al-Shaykh Maskin, attacking its northern and eastern flanks. Over the following two days, the Russian air force conducted over 80 air-strikes on the town.

On 29 December, the Army captured the Brigade 82 military base, on the outskirts of Al-Shaykh Maskin, as well as the northern part of the town itself. Government forces then temporarily lost the base due to bad weather, but retook it again overnight. The following day, government forces continued with their attempts to take full control of Al-Shaykh Maskin and, according to pro-government media, captured the eastern part of the town. This left them in control of half of Al-Shaykh Maskin. They reached the town's main square, as well as the Al-'Umari Mosque (north of the city center), while, according to pro-government media, the rebels issued a distress call for reinforcements. The Army's advances were supported by another 15 Russian air-strikes, according to the Syrian Observatory for Human Rights (SOHR).

According to SOHR, further attempts by the Army to advance were made between 2 and 4 January, as 43 more Russian air-strikes hit the town.

=== Failed rebel counter-attack ===
On 5 January, the rebels launched a counter-attack towards the Brigade 82 base. At the same time, the 15th Brigade, supported by National Defence Forces units, continued making attempts to advance to Tal Hamad hill, west of the town, but were unsuccessful. By this point, the military was in control of 55–60% of Al-Shaykh Maskin, according to pro-government media. By the evening, the rebel counter-attack stalled. The next day, the rebels reportedly renewed their counter-assault and stormed the southern perimeter of the Brigade 82 headquarters. However, eventually, this second assault failed as well. The Russian Air Force conducted 12 air-strikes throughout the day.

A third unsuccessful rebel assault was launched on the morning of 8 January, against the walls of the Brigade 82 Housing Facility. Pro-government sources reported that rebel fighters were hampered by poor weather, fierce resistance and Russian air-strikes. Opposition sources confirmed that since the start of the battle for Al-Shaykh Maskin the rebels had suffered ”major material and human losses", but reported they were still preparing to make new attempts to regain the base.

=== The Syrian Army captures Al-Shaykh Maskin ===
Between 9 and 10 January, SPHR reported that 33 government air-strikes were conducted against Al-Shaykh Maskin.

On 11 January, government forces said they had captured a total of 17 buildings in the southern part of the city and two days later, another 35 buildings, thus seizing the southern part of the town, and leaving them in control of 80 percent of Al-Shaykh Maskin.

Between 23 and 24 January, the military said it had captured Al-Zaheriyah school and its surrounding area, as well as the town of Al-Burj on the outskirts of Al-Shaykh Maskin, after more than 40 air-strikes were conducted. However, the rebels were able to recapture the school. Still, Army advances continued as they took control of more positions in the town, which included the Al-Bassam Mosque, parts of the Al-Diri neighborhood and large sections of the Saydaliyat road.

SOHR reported that during the night before 25 January, when the final Army assault was supposed to commence, a military detachment was sent to capture a height overlooking the town, from which the rebels could detect the military's planned attack from the north of the town. The fighting was heavy, but a heavy rain helped the Army unit climb up the height without being detected. The unit was then attacked from three sides, during which its commander, Mohammed Fares, was wounded. The detachment managed to hold the height until reinforcements arrived.

The next morning, SOHR reported, the Syrian Army launched its operation from the north side of the town and rapidly advanced, linking up with troops coming in from the east. The fighting started 08:30 am, and shortly thereafter the SAA's 15th Brigade captured the Al-'Umari Mosque. The military made gains in the northwestern neighborhood of Al-Shaykh Maskin, as well as other parts of the town, while they were covered by 25 air-strikes. The heaviest fighting of the day took place in the Al-Diri District. However, after seizing Al-Diri, the rebels were left with only two building blocks under their control. The Army's advances also enabled them to monitor all roads leading from the town to other nearby areas. Many rebels started withdrawing from the town, mainly towards Ibta' and Nawa. By 10:30 pm, the military had cleared Al-Shaykh Maskin of all rebel resistance. By the end of the battle, SOHR reported, 70% of the city had been rendered uninhabitable.

== Aftermath ==
On 27 January, the Army captured the strategic hilltops of Tal Hamad and Tal Koum.

== See also ==
- Battle of Al-Shaykh Maskin (2014)
