= Al-Mushannaf =

Al-Mushannaf المشنف
- Town
- Location within Syria
- Coordinates: 32°44′34″N 36°46′28″E
- PAL: 316/239
- Country: Syria
- Governorate: Suwayda
- District: Suwayda
- Subdistrict: Mushannaf
- Elevation: 1,400 m (4,600 ft)

Population (2004 census)
  - Total: 2,581
- Time zone: UTC+2 (EET)
  - Summer (DST): UTC+3 (EEST)

Al-Mushannaf (Arabic: المشنف also spelled Mushennef) is a town in southern Syria, administratively part of the Suwayda Governorate, located northeast of Suwayda. Nearby localities include Tarba to the north, Shahba and Salkhad to the northwest, Qanawat to the west and al-Kafr to the southwest. According to the Syria Central Bureau of Statistics (CBS), al-Mushannaf had a population of 2,581 in the 2004 census. The town is also the administrative center of the al-Mushannaf nahiyah of the Suwayda District consisting of 14 villages with a combined population of 17,134. Its inhabitants are predominantly Druze.

== History ==
Al-Mushannaf (ancient Nela or Nelkomia) was a part of the province of Syria under the Roman Empire on the borders with the province of Arabia Petraea.

Druze tribes settled in the village between 1856 and 1858.

== Roman-period temple ==
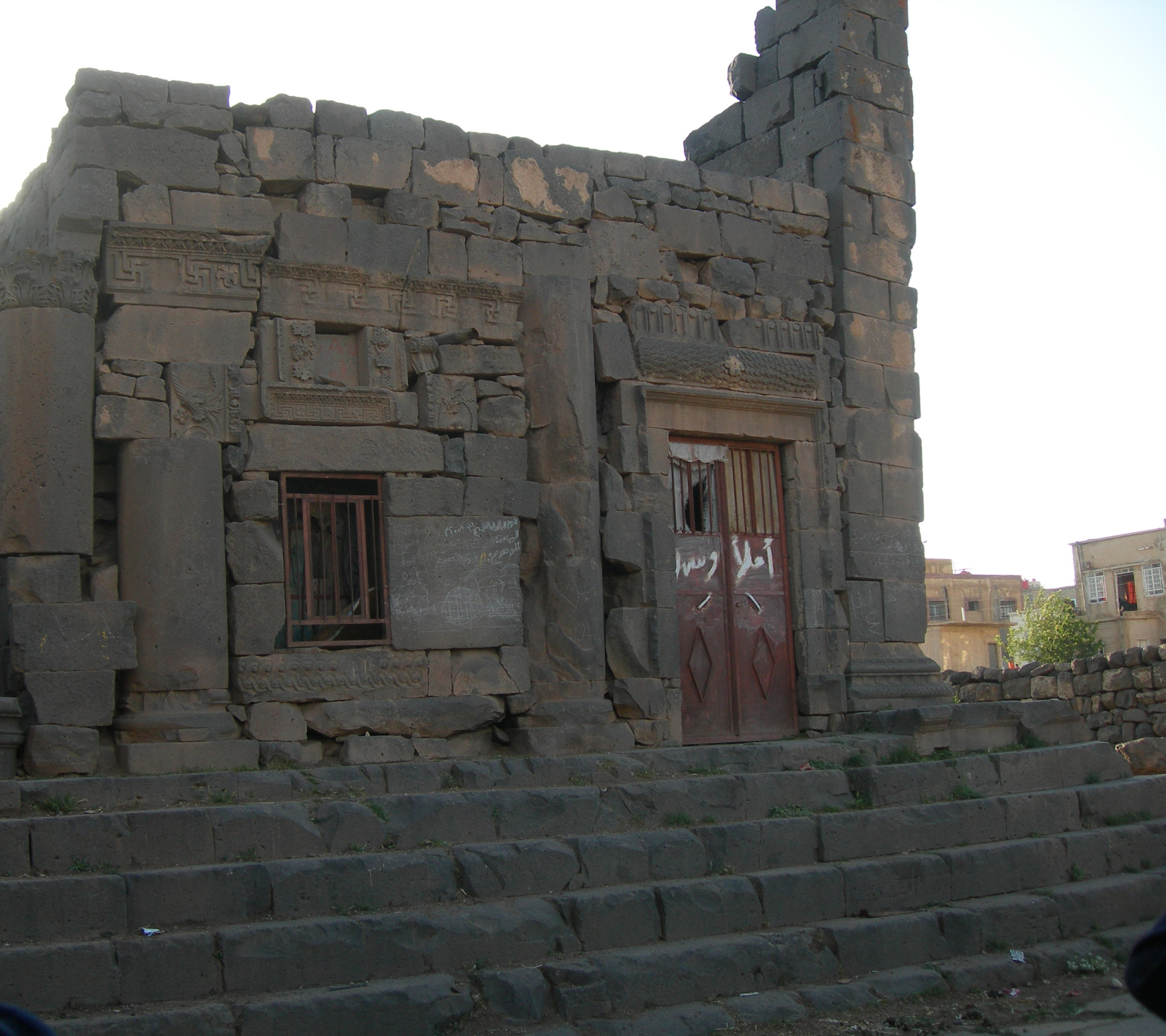
Remains of Roman-period temple

The village has a well preserved Roman prostyle temple dating to the first century BC that was dedicated to the gods Zeus and Athena. The temple stands on a podium, measuring 13.45 by 9.6 metres (44.1 ft × 31.5 ft), and faces a rectangular temenos which is surrounded by four walls and looks out on an artificial pool from its south side and colonnades on the other ones. The temple's entrance is aligned to the north and the courtyard has steps that lead to the inner sanctuary. The whole temple is built from the local black basalt rocks. The walls are built without binding materials and display beautiful ornaments including capitals and entablature, while the courtyard is paved with flat stones of various sizes.

A fragmentary votive inscription, likely from the lintel of the temple precinct's gateway, records that a local religious association (a synodos) built the structure for the safety and safe return of "King Agrippa," in fulfillment of a vow to Zeus and (ancestral) Athena. Scholars are divided over which Herodian king is meant. William Waddington identified him as Herod Agrippa I, which would date the inscription to 41 AD, whereas Francesca Mazzilli has argued that Herod Agrippa II remains a plausible identification, placing the inscription sometime between the mid- and late 1st century AD. The temple was excavated twice in the early 1900s by Howard Crosby Butler and Clarence Ward respectively, and was partially restored by the Syrian government.

== Religious buildings ==
- Maqam Prophet Safa (Druze Shrine)

== See also ==
- Druze in Syria

== Bibliography ==
- Ball, W. (2002). Rome in the East. Routledge. ISBN 9780415243575.
- Bowersock, G. (1994). Roman Arabia. Harvard University Press. ISBN 9780674777569.
- Firro, Kais (1992). A History of the Druzes, Volume 1. BRILL. ISBN 9789004094376.
- Kaizer, Ted (2008). The Variety of Local Religious Life in the Near East In the Hellenistic and Roman Periods. BRILL. ISBN 9789004167353.
- Mazzilli, Francesca (2018). Rural Cult Centres in the Hauran: Part of the Broader Network of the Near East (100 BC–AD 300). Archaeopress Roman Archaeology. Vol. 51. Oxford: Archaeopress. ISBN 978-1-78491-954-2.
- Shahîd, I. (1995). Byzantium and the Arabs in the Sixth Century: Ecclesiastical history, Volumes 1-2. Dumbarton Oaks. ISBN 9780884022145.
- Ward, Clarence (1907). "The Temple at Mushennef, Haurân, Syria". American Journal of Archaeology. 11 (1). Archaeological Institute of America: 1–6. doi:10.2307/497031. JSTOR 497031. This article incorporates text from this source, which is in the public domain.
