= Suwayda offensive (June 2018) =

2018 Syrian attack on ISIL

- Part of the Syrian Civil War
- Map of Suwayda Governorate
Date	7–22 June 2018 (2 weeks and 1 day)
Location	Suwayda and Rif Dimashq Governorates, Syria
Status	Indecisive: Syrian Army captures a number of towns, villages and many hills; ISIL retains control of a pocket of territory

Belligerents
(Syria) Syrian Arab Republic: Syrian Armed Forces; Hezbollah; SSNP; Al-Jabal Brigade	Islamic State

Commanders and leaders
Brig. Gen. Sharaf Mazen Ahmed Barakat †	Unknown

Units involved
Syrian Armed Forces: Syrian Army; Republican Guard; Syrian Air Force; National Defense Force; Eagles of the Whirlwind; Al-Jabal Brigade: Rocks of Urman Battalion	Military of ISIL

Casualties and losses
40 killed	31 killed

The Suwayda offensive of June 2018 began on 7 June in the rural parts of the Suwayda Governorate in southeastern Syria, after an evacuation deal was made between ISIL and the Syrian government concluding an anti-ISIL offensive in southern Damascus.

== The offensive ==
The offensive was launched on 7 June, after several days of preparatory artillery shelling, The Syrian military launched several airstrikes on ISIL positions in the Northeastern part of the Suwayda Governorate and advanced 12 kilometers on the first day towards the village of Khirbet al-Umbashi, capturing four areas. Government forces continued to advance over the following two days and by 9 June, they were within 15 kilometers of the ISIL stronghold of Al-Kara’a. By 13 June, after government forces failed to capture the whole ISIL pocket, the intensity of the fighting decreased.

On 16 June, the Army clashed with ISIL in Al-Habiriyah in the northeastern part of the province, while they also shelled the village along with Khirbet al-Umbashi and Al-Tamthuna. The Syrian air force also targeted ISIL positions in Al-Kara’a. The next day, the military began sending more forces to the area in preparation for the second phase of their offensive.

On 18 June, pro-government forces were able to capture Bir al-Awra and Tell Arar in northeastern Al-Suwayda, as well as make some gains near Tell Asfar and Khirbet al-Umbashi. As they advanced, ISIL was able to conduct an ambush, killing two Hezbollah fighters. The following day, government troops once again advanced and captured Khirbet al-Umbashi, with eight soldiers being killed in the area during the day.

On 21 June, the Syrian military captured Khirbet Hawi Husayn in the northeast from ISIL, while ISIL killed a Syrian Brigadier General in clashes in the region. The next day, according to Islamic State's Amaq Agency, ISIL ambushed Syrian forces near Tell Ghanem killing 20 government soldiers as well as a commander from the Syrian military, in the process they also managed to destroy two tanks and another vehicle. While the Syrian military reportedly captured the villages of Tell Mughir and Abu Jabal.

== Aftermath ==
On 25 June, the Amaq Agency claimed that ISIL attacked the Syrian army near Bir al-Neama killing 9 soldiers as well destroying 2 vehicles.

On 14 July, ISIL launched an offensive against pro-government forces in the northeastern part of the governorate attacking a dam and a military outpost, though making no territorial gains they inflicted several casualties on pro-government forces.

On 25 July, ISIL conducted an Inghimasi attack in the Governorate killing more than 250. The attack began with attacks on government positions around the city and checkpoints, after running out of ammunition the fighters detonated their explosive belts, ISIL attempted to carry out two other attacks but the Syrian airforce struck ISIL fighters before they had the opportunity to detonate their explosive belts.

On 1 August, ISIL conducted a raid at the Khalkhalah airbase. Amaq news agency claimed that militants destroyed 2 warplanes and 6 drones. However, according to military sources, security force foiled the attack.

== See also ==
- Deir ez-Zor offensive (May–June 2018)
- 2018 Southern Syria offensive
- Southern Damascus offensive (April–May 2018)
- 2018 Suwayda attacks
- Suwayda offensive (August–November 2018)
