= Al-Qatarji militia =

- Leader: Husam Ahmad Qatarji
- Dates active: 2016-present
- Country: Syria
- Wars: Syrian civil war; Syrian Desert campaign (December 2017 – December 2024)

Al-Qatarji militia (Arabic: ميليشيا القاطرجي) is a militant organization in Syria

== History ==
The group was founded by businessman Husam Ahmad Qatarji through oil smuggling from Syrian Democratic Forces territories Which brought him into conflict with the Hamsho company and the Qatarji company which had 400 vehicles, recruiting for Syrian Arab Army, Supposedly displaced Syrians in Aleppo and fought against the Turkish Forces in Afrin and was attacked by the Islamic State
