= Muhammad Tariq al-Khadra =

Syrian Palestinian military commander

- محمد طارق الخضراء
- Born: 1941; Safed, Mandatory Palestine
- Died: 5 August 2020 (aged 78–79); Damascus, Syria
- Burial place: al-Dahdah cemetery
- Military career
- Allegiance: Palestine Liberation Army
- Service years: 1960–2020
- Rank: Major general
- Conflicts: Six-Day War; Yom Kippur War; Lebanese Civil War; Syrian Civil War

Muhammad Tariq Al-Khadra (1941 – 5 August 2020) was a Palestinian general, chief of staff of the Palestine Liberation Army, and a member of the General Union of Palestinian Writers and Journalists.

== Career ==
Al-Khadra was born in the city of Safed and lived his early childhood in the cities of Gaza, Haifa. During the Nakba in 1948, Al-Khadra was displaced as a child with his family from Safed to the city of Homs in Syria via Bint Jbeil in Lebanon.

He spent his first stage of education in Homs until 1958, before continuing his secondary studies at Jawdat Al-Hashemi School in Damascus in 1960.

In the same year, 1960, he volunteered in the Syrian Arab Army (the army of the Northern Territory in the unified state between Syria and Egypt) and joined the Military Technical College in Cairo.

He graduated from the Homs Military Academy in 1962 with the rank of lieutenant, and worked in military engineering units. After establishing the Palestine Liberation Organization, he joined the Palestine Liberation Army in mid-1966 with the rank of first lieutenant and was appointed to the General Command of the Palestine Liberation Army, headquartered in Cairo.

Two months before the 1967 war, Al-Khadra joined the Palestine Liberation Army (PLA) units fighting in the Gaza Strip and fought the war in defense of the Strip as a company commander. After the defeat, he joined the PLA units stationed on the Suez Canal front near the Fayed and remained for ten months as chief of staff of the Sa’iqa Battalion within the Ain Goliath forces. in this location. In mid-1968, he moved to work in the units of the PLA in the Syria and assumed the duties of commanding the Thunderbolt Battalion in the Hattin Forces with the rank of captain.

He led his unit, which was stationed in the southern sector of the Syrian front (at Wadi al-Raqqad) from late 1968 until the first quarter of 1970, during which he fought and supported many Fedayeen operations against Israeli forces.

== Personal life ==
He was married and had three children, a son (died in 2001) and two daughters. He is the brother of Major General Hazem Al-Khadra, who assumed command of the Syrian Air Force between the years 2005–2008 and then Director-General of the General Civil Aviation Corporation.

== Death ==
Khadra died on 5 August 2020 in Damascus due to COVID-19 and was buried in Al-Dahdah cemetery.
