= Abu Dali, Idlib =

Abu Dali, Idlib أبو دالي
- Villagena
- Location in Syria
- Coordinates: 35.45°N 36.9°E
- Country: Syria
- Governorate: Idlib
- District: Maarrat al-Nu'man District
- Subdistrict: Al-Tamanah Nahiyah

Population (2004)
  - Total: 1,168
- Time zone: UTC+2 (EET)
  - Summer (DST): UTC+3 (EEST)
- City Qrya Pcode: C4093

Abu Dali, Idlib (Arabic: أبو دالي) is a Syrian village located in Al-Tamanah Nahiyah in Maarrat al-Nu'man District, Idlib. According to the Syria Central Bureau of Statistics (CBS), Abu Dali had a population of 1168 in the 2004 census.

During the Syrian Civil War, it was controlled by tribal leaders loyal to the government. It did not see much violence in the first years of the war, and had functioned as a local economic hub between rebel-run areas and those under government forces. A National Defence Forces (pro-government militia) garrison was located there from 2014. The garrison was besieged by Tahrir al-Sham (HTS) forces in October 2017. The attack, filmed by HTS, shows a unit of hundred soldiers, few motos, vehicles and tanks, overrunning the local defense. The attack sparked a protracted ground battle between the government and HTS, with government and Russian warplanes attacking HTS targets in the area. The Syrian Army recaptured it in late December 2017.
