= Suwayda offensive (August–November 2018) =

Military campaign in southern Syria against ISIL

- Part of the Syrian Civil War and Russian military intervention in the Syrian Civil War
Date	6 August – 19 November 2018 (3 months, 1 week and 4 days)
Location	Suwayda and Rif Dimashq Governorates, Syria
Status	Syrian government victory: Syrian Army captures the Suwayda part of the ISIL enclave; Syrian Army captures peak of the volcanic Al-Safa plateau on 17 November

Belligerents
(Ba'athist Syria) Syrian Government; Russia (since 5 October); Hezbollah; SSNP; Palestine Liberation Army; Mountain Brigade	Islamic State

Commanders and leaders
(Syria) Brig. Gen. Suhail Abbas (WIA) (Syria) Mohammad Sahlab ("Abu Ali") † (Palestine) Brig. Gen. Walid Mari al-Kurdi †	Abu Hajer Al-Shishani †

Units involved
Syrian Armed Forces; Syrian Arab Army; Republican Guard; "Kadish" forces; 4th Armoured Division; 1st Corps; 5th Mechanized Division; 9th Armoured Division; 15th Special Forces Division; 2nd Corps; 1st Armoured Division; 10th Mechanized Division; 14th Special Forces Division; 3rd Corps; 3rd Armoured Division; Syrian Air Force; National Defense Force; Russian Armed Forces; Aerospace Forces; Eagles of the Whirlwind; Mountain Brigade; Rocks of Urman Battalion	Military of ISIL

Strength
Unknown	1,000–1,200

Casualties and losses
245 killed (per SOHR)	428 killed (per SOHR)

The Suwayda offensive of August–November 2018 began on 6 August 2018, in rural areas of the Suwayda Governorate in southeast Syria after the Islamic State (IS) members committed a string of suicide bombings and gun attacks.

== The offensive ==
The Syrian Arab Army began an offensive on eastern Suwayda on 6 August 2018, around 16:00 (EET) after building up its forces in the area for several days. With its elite 4th Division at the head, the Syrian Arab Army succeeded in making progress in the eastern Badiya Desert after an intense battle with the Islamic State of Iraq and the Levant (ISIL) during that afternoon.

The Syrian Arab Army continued on the following day with field operations in the eastern neighboring province of Suwayda, on the large pocket of ISIL near the Homs border. At the head of their fourth armored division, the Syrian Arab Army started the day by attacking the Shinvan and Al-Sakiiah areas held by ISIL. On 7 August, the pro-Government Syrian Social Nationalist Party (SSNP) captured and hanged a fighter of ISIL after one of his comrades executed a suicide bombing that killed at least four SSNP members. On 8 August, Syrian forces continued to expel ISIL from the desert east of Suwayda in an attempt to recover the entire pocket. According to military sources, the Syrian Army, with the support of local fighters, managed to achieve further progress on several fronts; it reached the periphery of the towns of Qaisoum and Bir Maselam. The same source said that government troops were infiltrating about 20 kilometres (12 mi) east of the cities of Rami and Shabka where ISIL committed a massacre on 25 July, when the group launched a sudden attack on several villages and towns east of Suwayda and slaughtered more than 200 civilians, and injured several hundred others.

=== Siege of al-Safa ===
On 16 August, ISIL asked for a ceasefire with the Syrian Army. ISIL offered to release the kidnapped civilians from the Sweida Governorate in exchange for safe passage to the Al-Mayadeen countryside in rural Deir Ezzor. The Syrian Arab Army told the Islamic State that they will not accept anything other than a complete surrender of this mountain and the release of the 30+ civilians that were kidnapped by their fighters. The Syrian army sealed off the entire Al-Safa mountain on 23 August after several days of fighting.

On 24 August, the Syrian Arab Army broke through the Islamic State’s defenses at the Khirbat Hawi area, which is located at the southwestern axis of the Al-Safa Mountain. On 25 August, ISIL launched a counter-offensive and managed to drive back the Syrian Arab Army troops from several points they captured the previous day. At 28–29 August, the Syrian Arab Army managed to regain all lost points, along with capturing others positions from ISIL, including a strategic water dam in the Hawi Awad area.

On 25 September, in clashes with ISIL, Brigadier General Walid al-Kurdi in charge of the Palestinian Liberation Army's special forces was killed in the Safa Volcanic field.

On 2 October, ISIL executed a Druze woman named Tharwat Abu Ammar, a hostage from the 25 July Suwayda attacks, threatening to kill a whole group of captive women and children within three days if Syrian Government forces didn't call off the al-Safa offensive and release ISIL prisoners. Several Druze protestors in Suwayda, including several activists and religious leaders, rallied around a government building and demanded the government to work to release the captured Druze hostages. After a failure in talks with Russian officials, the Syrian Government and ISIL set up a committee to mediate between them.

=== Hostages released ===
On 20 October, ISIL reached an agreement with Syrian and Russian officials to release 6 hostages in exchange of what was reportedly 27 million dollars, with continued talks, a prisoner exchange was also agreed upon between both parties in return for ISIL releasing all hostages. According to the Russian MOD, the Syrian Arab Army reportedly rescued all the remaining hostages held by ISIL on 8 November, in a special operation north-east of Palmyra under the guidance of Russian special operations forces from Russian Reconciliation Center. Some reports stated the possibility of Russian special forces being covertly deployed in the province of al-Suwayda in order to support the Syrian Army advance on ISIS positions in the al-Safa area.

=== Syrian army reaches peak of al-Safa ===
On 17 November, the Syrian army managed to overrun the ISIL defenses around the peak of Al-Safa and impose control of the hilltop, killing a Daesh commander named Abu Hajer Al-Shishani. The territorial control of the Syrian army of the Al-Safa volcanic field increased to 80%, with ISIL still having a presence on the western axis and several sources saying ISIL fighters were withdrawing towards eastern Homs.

The Syrian army officially declared the al-Safa field cleared on 19 November, ending the offensive with the SAA in full control of all of southern Syria for the first time since 2011, excluding Al-Tanf.

== See also ==
- Suwayda offensive (June 2018)
- 2018 Southern Syria offensive
- 2018 Suwayda attacks
- List of wars and battles involving ISIL
