= Rami, Suwayda =

Rami رامي
- Village
- Location within Syria
- Coordinates: 32°44′31″N 36°47′35″E
- Country: Syria
- Governorate: Suwayda
- District: Suwayda
- Subdistrict: Mushannaf

Population (2004 census)
  - Total: 1,432
- Time zone: UTC+2 (EET)
  - Summer (DST): UTC+3 (EEST)

Rami (Arabic: رامي) is a village situated in the Suwayda District of Suwayda Governorate, in southern Syria. According to the Syria Central Bureau of Statistics (CBS), Rami had a population of 1,432 in the 2004 census. Its inhabitants are predominantly Druze.

== See also ==
- Druze in Syria
