= Palestine Liberation Army =

Semi-independent military branch of Palestine Liberation Organization

- جيش التحرير الفلسطيني; Jaysh at-Tahrir al-Filastini
- PLA Emblem
- Leader: Brig. Gen. Akram Muhammad al-Salti
- Dates active: 1964–present
- Allegiance: PLO (de jure); Ba'athist Syria (de facto; c. 1973–2024)
- Active regions: Syria; Historically: Gaza Strip, Jordan, Iraq
- Ideology: Palestinian nationalism Anti-Zionism
- Size: 6,000 (2017)

The Palestine Liberation Army (PLA; Arabic: جيش التحرير الفلسطيني, romanized: Jaysh at-Taḥrīr al-Filasṭīnī) is the de jure military wing of the Palestine Liberation Organization (PLO), set up at the 1964 Arab League summit held in Alexandria, Egypt, with the mission of fighting Israel. However, it has never been under effective PLO control, but rather it has been controlled by its various host governments, usually Syria. Even though it initially operated in several countries, in 2015 the PLA was only active in Syria and recruited male Palestinian refugees.

== History ==
=== Foundation and early operations ===
Immediately after its creation at the 1964 Arab League summit in Alexandria, the PLO (then headed by Ahmad Shukeiri) was effectively under the control of the Arab states, especially Nasser's Egypt. The Palestinians would not gain independent control of the organization until Yasser Arafat's Fatah faction wrested it from Nasser-backed Palestinians in 1968–69.

Accordingly, the PLA was officially set up in 1964 as the PLO's armed wing despite lacking an actual operation link to the PLO. In reality, the PLA was created by Nasser as an "auxiliary formation". It was staffed by Palestinian refugees under the control of the host countries, who would perform their military service in these units instead of in their host countries' regular armed forces. Formally, the PLA fell under the command of the PLO's Military Department, but in practice, none of the governments involved relinquished control of the brigades. From an early point, the PLA became especially influenced by Syria.

The PLA was originally organized into three brigades, named after historic battles:

- Ayn Jalut, based in Gaza, then administered by Egypt
- Qadisiyyah, originally based in Iraq, but transferred to Jordan in 1967; it passed under Syrian control in 1971
- Hattin, based in Syria

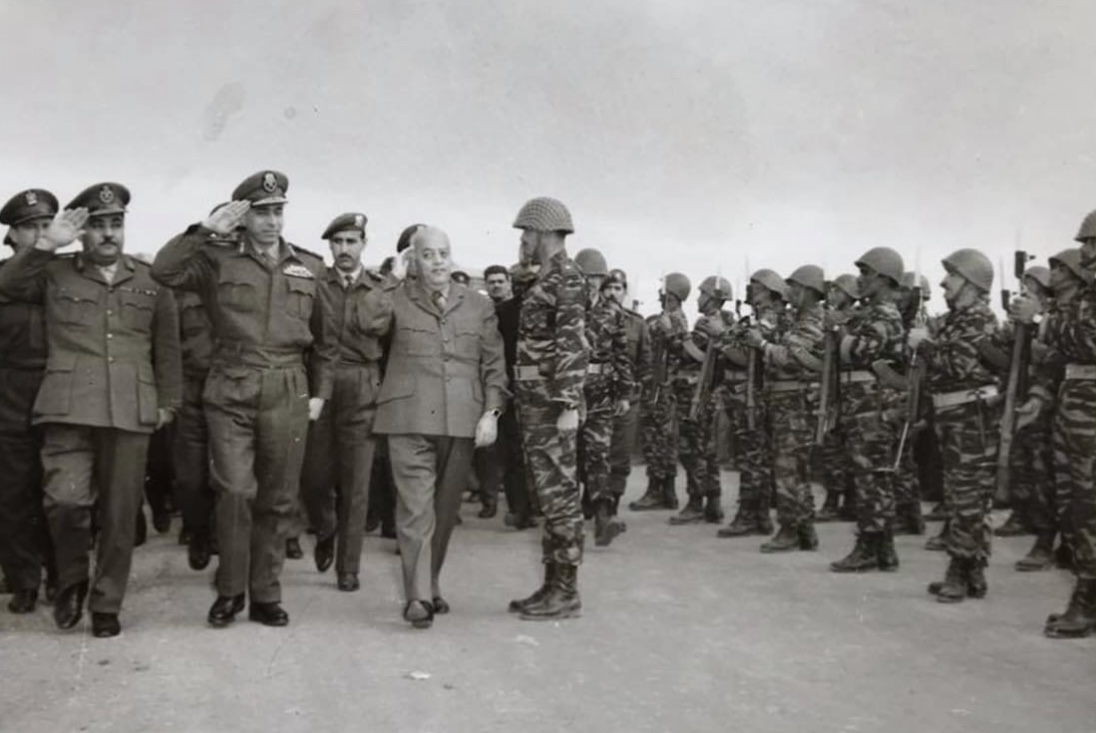
Syrian President Amin al-Hafiz with army officers at the PLA parade, 1966

The PLA was relatively well equipped and trained, and even fielded armour. Its materiel mostly originated in the Soviet Union. However, the three PLA brigades remained under-strength until the 1980s. The PLA was never deployed in the form of a single fighting unit for the PLO, but instead elements were utilized as an auxiliary and support force by its controller governments. PLA brigades fought in the Six-Day War of 1967 as part of the Egyptian and Syrian militaries. In 1968, the Popular Liberation Forces (Arabic: quwwat at-tahrir ash-sha'biyya), better known as the "Yarmouk Brigade", were established within the framework of the PLA to perform commando actions against Israeli forces in the Gaza Strip, occupied by Israeli forces the year before. Generally the PLA refrained from this kind of underground action, having been built up as something of a conventional military parade showpiece complete with bands and guards of honor.

=== Black September, Yom Kippur War, and Lebanese Civil War ===
After its foundation, the PLA came to be used as political cover by its host governments, especially Syria. In course of the Black September of 1970, hastily repainted Syrian Army tanks under the command of the PLA were sent into Jordan to aid the Palestinian guerrillas against the Jordanian Armed Forces, probably with the ultimate aim to overthrow the Jordanian monarchy. Although the initial invasion was successful, with PLA forces capturing Irbid and declaring it a "liberated" city, the Jordanian military eventually managed to stall the attack in course of heavy fighting. After international pressure, and threats of intervention from both Israel and the United States, the combined PLA-Syrian forces were forced to turn back; an embarrassment which would contribute greatly to the overthrow of the government of Salah Jadid by Hafez al-Assad. The failure of the invasion has also attributed to the fact that the Syrian Air Force under al-Assad had refused to enter the fighting in the first place.

PLA units saw action during the Yom Kippur War in 1973, fighting both at the Syrian and Egyptian fronts. From 1973, the PLA effectively became part of the Syrian Army.

During the Lebanese Civil War, Syria likewise made extensive use of the PLA as a proxy force, including against the PLO (the PLA however proved unreliable when ordered to fight other Palestinians, and suffered from mass defections). In this conflict, it acted alongside the as-Sa'iqa faction of the PLO to support Syrian interests. Already deployed from 1975 in Lebanon, the PLA acted as cover for the Syrian Armed Forces during the start of the Syrian occupation of Lebanon in 1976, as invading Syrian soldiers were dressed in PLA uniforms. The PLA and as-Sa'iqa offered protection during the 1976 Lebanese presidential election, helping Élias Sarkis in getting elected as President of Lebanon. Overall, the PLA proved to be relatively ineffective in Lebanon. The PLA was largely destroyed as a fighting force during the 1982 Israeli invasion of southern Lebanon that started the 1982 Lebanon War. Its fighters in Lebanon left for Tunis when the PLO evacuated Beirut that year, in a US-sponsored cease fire agreement. The Egyptian PLA was also deployed in Lebanon in 1976, after Palestinian leader Yassir Arafat had approached the Egyptian president Anwar Sadat, to mend relations damaged by Sadat's peacemaking attempts with Israel. Still, the Egyptian units never proved as important as the fully deployed Syrian PLA. In 1991, the first commander-in-chief of the PLA Maj. Gen. Wajih Al Madani died.

Many PLA soldiers in Egypt and Jordan later became the core of the Palestinian Authority's (PNA) National Guard, after the signing of the 1993 Oslo Accords, when they were allowed to enter the Palestinian Territories to take up positions in the PNA security services.

=== Syrian Civil War ===
The Syrian PLA remains active, closely coordinated with as-Sa'iqa, although the importance of both had diminished over the years. The PLA has been rebuilt and Palestinians in Syria are still drafted to perform their military service in its ranks. Though completely staffed by Palestinians, it remains outside of the PLO's control, and is in effect integrated into the Syrian Army. Nevertheless, it poses as an independent entity, and occasionally organizes pro-government rallies celebrating Syrian commitment to the Palestinian cause.

With the outbreak of the Syrian Civil War, the PLA sided with the government and began to fight against the Syrian opposition. Led by Major General Muhammad Tariq al-Khadra, the PLA has taken part in campaigns in the Rif Dimashq, Daraa, and Quneitra Governorates. In early 2015, a number of PLA fighters led by Major Khaldoun Al Nader were allegedly executed for refusing to fight against rebels in Daraa.

Around 228 PLA fighters have been killed in action by September 2017; one of the highest ranking fatalities being a brigadier general Anwar al-Saqa.

On 5 August 2020, commander of the PLA Maj. Gen. Muhammad Tariq al-Khadra died in Damascus due to COVID-19.

After the fall of the Assad regime in late 2024, the Syrian transitional government demanded that all Palestinian armed groups in Syria disarm themselves, dissolve their military formations, and instead focus on political and charitable work. Meanwhile, the PLA and other Palestinian armed factions met at the Damascus headquarters of the PLO where they expressed support for Syrian unity and the removal of Assad as well as condemned the 2024 Israeli invasion of Syria. By late January 2025, the Syrian transitional government had abolished the compulsory conscription for Syrian Palestinians into the PLA and begun to reorganize the entire Syrian military. General Intelligence Service director Majed Faraj of the Palestinian Authority indicated that the PLA would be dissolved into the reorganized Syrian army.

== Operations ==
- Six-Day War
- War of Attrition
  - Battle of Karameh
- Black September
- Yom Kippur War
- Lebanese Civil War
- Syrian Civil War
  - Rif Dimashq Governorate campaign
    - Siege of Darayya and Muadamiyat
    - Battle of Yarmouk Camp (2015)
    - Battle of Zabadani (2015)
    - Rif Dimashq offensive (September 2015)
    - Rif Dimashq offensive (April–May 2016)
    - Rif Dimashq offensive (June–August 2016)
    - Rif Dimashq offensive (June–October 2016)
    - Qaboun offensive (2017)
    - Rif Dimashq offensive (February–April 2018)
    - Southern Damascus offensive (April–May 2018)
  - Daraa Governorate campaign
    - Second Battle of Al-Shaykh Maskin
    - 2018 Southern Syria offensive

== See also ==
- Arab–Israeli conflict
- Israeli–Palestinian conflict
- Military of Palestine
- List of armed groups in the Syrian Civil War

Similar Organizations:

- Arab Liberation Army
- Army of the Holy War
