= 1st Corps (Syria) =

- الفيلق الأول
- Syrian Armed Forces Flag
- Active: 1985 – 2024
- Country: Ba'athist Syria (surrendered)
- Allegiance: Syrian Armed Forces (surrendered)
- Branch: Syrian Arab Army (surrendered)
- Type: Corps
- Size: up to 45,000 soldiers
- Garrison/HQ: Damascus; Daraa (5th Division); Latakia (6th Division); Aleppo (7th Division); Daraa (9th Division); As-Suwayda (15th Division)
- Engagements: Lebanese Civil War; Syrian Civil War

Commanders
- Current Commander: Maj. Gen. Suhail Asaad
- Chief of Staff: Maj. Gen. Hatem Abbas

The 1st Corps (Arabic: الفيلق الأول) was a corps of the Syrian Army that was first formed in 1985. Richard Bennett wrote in 2001 that "three corps [were] formed in 1985 to give the Army more flexibility and to improve combat efficiency by decentralising the command structure, absorbing at least some of the lessons learned during the 1982 Lebanon War." He said that the 1st Corps covered southern Syria, in particular the heavily fortified defense zone between Damascus and the Golan Heights and south to Daraa near the border with Jordan. On 29 December 2022, Major General Suhail Asaad was appointed as commander of the 1st Army Corps of the Syrian Arab Army.

== Structure in 2001 ==
Bennett's estimate of the 2001 order of battle was:

- 1st Corps, HQ Damascus
  - 5th Armoured Division, which included the 17th and 96th Armoured Brigades and the 112th Mechanised Brigade
  - 6th Armoured Division, with the 12th and 98th Armoured Brigades and the 11th Mechanised Brigades
  - 7th Mechanised Division, with the 58th and 68th Armoured Brigades and the 78th Mechanised Brigade
  - 8th Armoured Division, which included the 62nd and 65th Armoured Brigades and the 32nd Mechanised Brigade
  - 9th Armoured Division, with the 43rd and 91st Armoured Brigades and the 52nd Mechanised Brigade. The 52nd Armoured Brigade was reported in Daraa in May 2013.

Bennett said the 1st Corps also had four independent special forces regiments, including two trained for helicopter-inserted commando operations against the Israeli signals intelligence and observation posts on Mount Hermon and elsewhere in the Golan Heights.

Cordesman et al. said from 2002 to 2005, the command of the 1st Corps was replaced three times.

Tom Cooper wrote that prior to the Syrian Civil War, the 1st Corps' main role was defence against an Israeli invasion over the Golan Heights or through Jordan. It had two lines of defence stretching along the cease-fire lines from 1973, and controlled over four divisions (three mechanised and one armoured), a special forces division and two independent infantry brigades (seemingly the 61st and 90th).

The corps commander Major General Faraq Shehada was seized as a prisoner of war on 29 June 2012.

== Structure in 2013 ==
- 5th Mechanized Division
  - 112th Mechanised Brigade - Isra
  - 132nd and 15th Mechanised Brigades (Cooper 2015 says 132nd and 35th Mech Brigades)
  - 12th Armoured Brigade - Isra
  - 175th Artillery Regiment - Cooper 2015 says this regiment, at Isra equipped with the 2S1, was a cadre and never deployed outside its base, and then overrun in February 2014.
- 6th Armoured Division
  - 45th Regiment
  - 85th Brigade
  - 76th Armored Brigade - now defunct. Formerly part of 1st Division
- 7th Mechanized Division
  - 68th, 121st and 88 Mechanised Brigades
  - 78th Armoured Brigade
  - (an unspecified) Artillery Regiment (nb. Cooper 2015 identified this regiment as the 85th)
- 9th Armoured Division - Major General Yusuf Ahmed
  - 33rd, 34th and 43rd Armoured Brigades
  - 52nd Mechanised Brigade - disbanded c. 2011
  - (an unspecified) Artillery Regiment (nb. Cooper 2015 identified this regiment as the 15th)

In addition, the corps still included the 61st and 90th Infantry Brigades (Independent) in 2013. Within the last one/two years, Brigade 90 has been reported in the Quneitra area, but its base was reportedly overrun by rebels in February 2014.

== Structure in 2019 ==
- 5th Mechanized Division
  - 15th, 112th and 132nd Mechanized Brigades
  - 12th Armored Brigade
  - 38th Infantry Brigade
  - 59th Commando Battalion
  - 175th Artillery Regiment
- 6th Armored Division (formed in 2015)
  - 76th, 85th and 88th Armored Brigades
  - 55th Mechanized Brigade
  - 45th Special Forces Regiment
- 7th Mechanized Division
  - 88th, 90th and 121st Mechanized Brigades
  - 78th Armored Brigade
  - 70th Artillery Brigade
- 9th Armored Division
  - 34th, 43rd and 701st Armored Brigades
  - 52nd Mechanized Brigade
  - 467th Special Forces Regiment
  - 89th Artillery Brigade
- 15th Special Forces Division
  - 35th, 44th and 127th Special Forces Regiments
  - 404th and 405th Armored Regiments
  - 176th Artillery Battalion

== Notes ==
- Cooper, Tom (2015). Syrian Conflagration: The Civil War 2011-2013. Middle East@War Volume 1. Helion & Co. ISBN 978-1-910294-10-9.
