= Inghimasi =

Jihadi assault shock troops

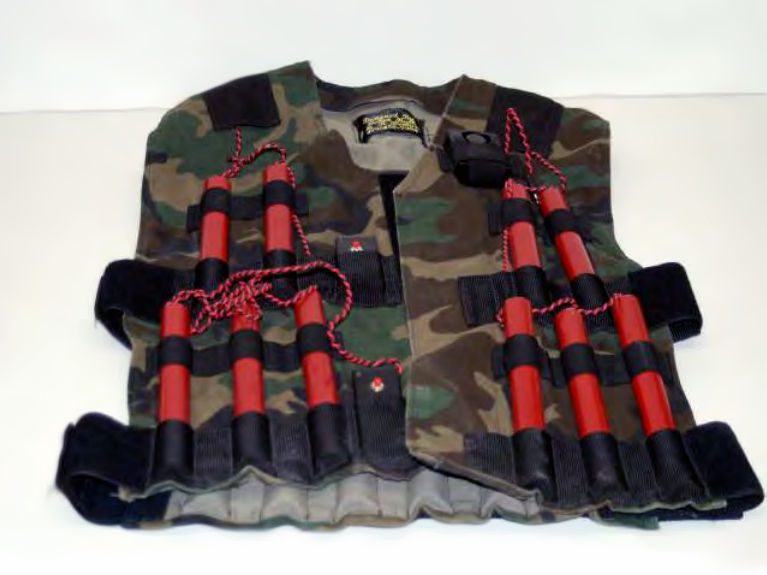
Inghimasi often wear explosive belts (example pictured) alongside regular weapons in order to inflict as much damage as possible on their enemies.

Inghimasi (Arabic: اِنْغِمَاسِيّ, romanized: Inġimāsīy, "become immersed"), also called shahid (Arabic: شَهِيد, "martyr") and istishhadi (Arabic: اِسْتِشْهَادِيّ, "martyrdom seeker"), are forlorn hope or suicide attack shock troops utilized by several extremist jihadist groups, such as the Islamic State of Iraq and the Levant (ISIL), al-Qaeda, Jabhat al-Nusra, Tahrir al-Sham, Boko Haram, and al-Shabaab.

== Definition and etymology ==
Inghimasi are usually well-trained guerrilla fighters who are organized into teams, and infiltrate enemy positions in order to cause as much damage as possible, generally expecting to be killed while doing so. They often wear explosive belts that are to be detonated when the possibility arises that they could be captured, run out of ammunition, or expect to be overwhelmed. Inghimasi fighters usually wear clothing resembling that of the target's forces, and use light weapons. Inghimasi have to agree to a 'no return' policy, and expect to die in combat. Unlike normal suicide attack forces, however, an Inghimasi can survive their missions and return to their base. The Islamic State gives new recruits the option of becoming an Inghimasi when enlisting, along with the option of operating a SVBIED or being a regular fighter. The word comes from the Arabic word Inghamasa (انغمس) meaning "to plunge" or "become immersed".

== History ==
Arabic media outlets first reported of Inghimasis in 2013; however, its use on social media originates to 2011, the origin of the Inghimasi concept is attributed to al-Nusra. As the Inghimasi concept is attributed to al-Nusra, founded as the Syrian branch of the Islamic State of Iraq in early 2012, this method of attack became prominent during the Syrian Civil War and eventually the 2014–2017 Iraqi Civil War but the usage of Inghimasi tactics have also been used during the Second Libyan Civil War. Notable uses of Inghimasi operations include the Battle of Al-Tabqa airbase, the Siege of al-Fu'ah and Kafriya, the 2016 Battle of Kirkuk, and various times during the 2012–2016 Battle of Aleppo such as during the Aleppo offensive in October and November 2016.

The Inghimasi method of attack is not unique to the Middle East, and has been used in terrorist attacks outside the region. Al-Shabaab in Somalia is known to employ Inghimasis, and the Islamic State's branch in Afghanistan uses them as well. Furthermore, the individuals involved in the November 2015 Paris attacks operated in a similar fashion to Inghimasi.

== Notable Inghimasi members and operations ==
- Hudhayfah al-Badri, son of ISIL leader Abu Bakr al-Baghdadi, died in combat during an Inghimasi operation against the Syrian Army and Russian troops in Homs Governorate.
- 2018 As-Suwayda attacks
- A raid by four inghimasi fighters belonging to the Islamic State's West Africa Province against Diffa in Niger on 9 April 2019, during the Chad Basin campaign (2018–2019)
- A Taliban attack upon Forward Operating Base Salerno in Khost in June 2012 was an inghimasi.
