= Deir ez-Zor offensive (2024) =

SDF and HTS-led offensive against Syrian Army in Deir ez-Zor

- Part of the Deir ez-Zor Governorate campaign, 2024 Syrian opposition offensive and the Eastern Syria insurgency in the Syrian civil war
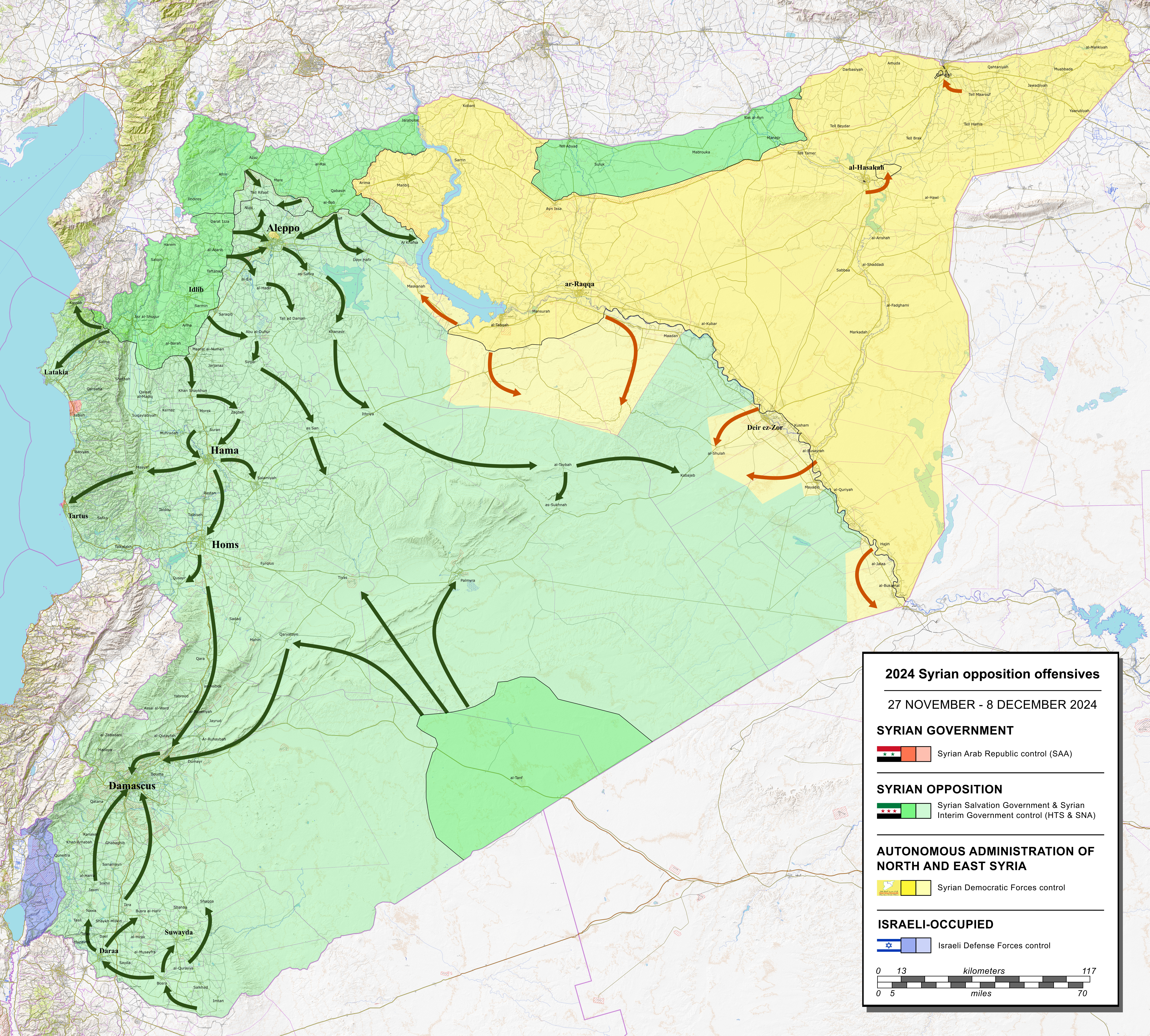
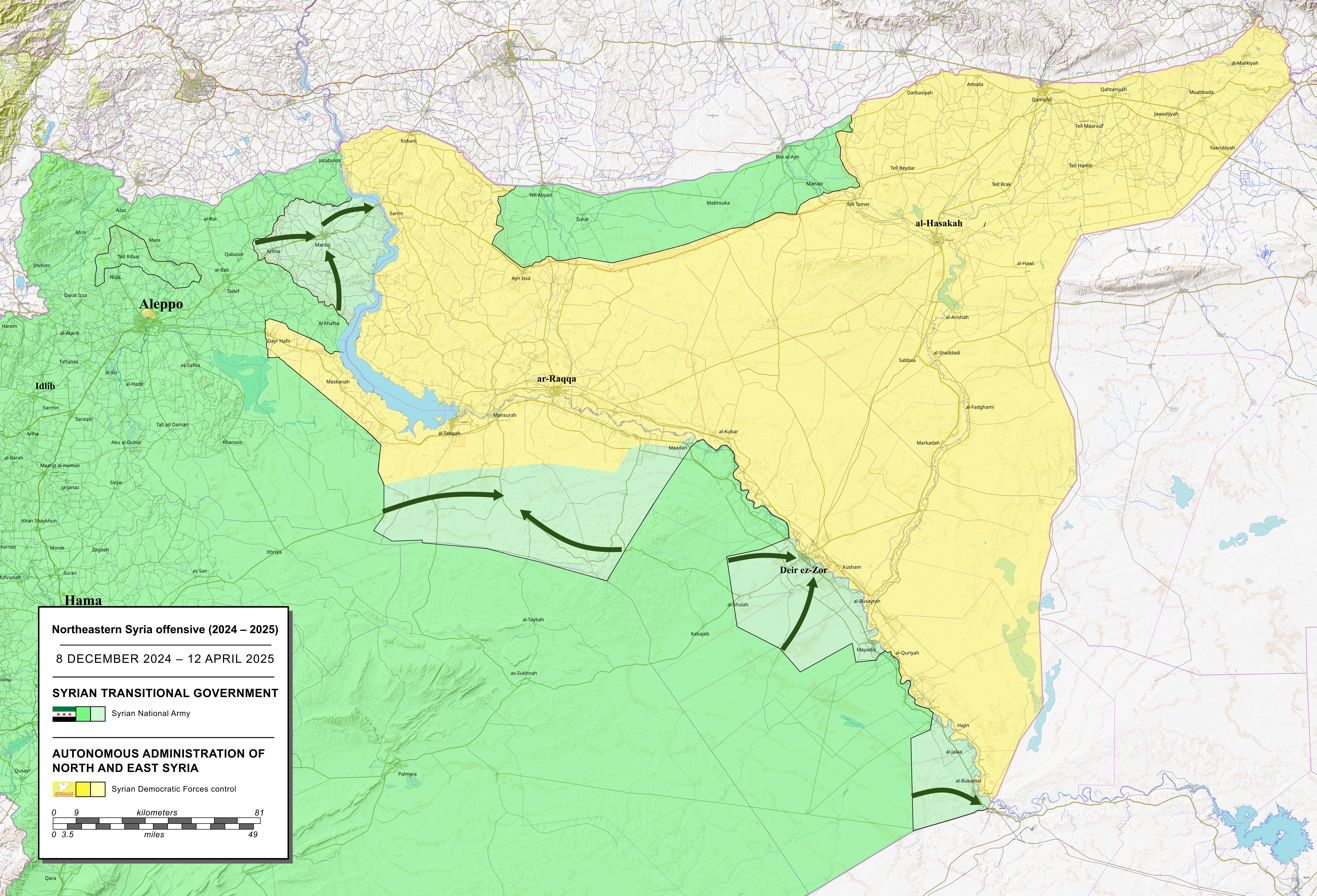
- Map of Deir ez-Zor in Syria; Controlled by the Syrian opposition; Controlled by the Syrian Democratic Forces
Date	3–11 December 2024 (1 week and 1 day)
Location	Deir ez-Zor Governorate, Syria
Result	Syrian opposition victory
Territorial changes	SDF captures 7 villages of the "Khasham Pocket" on the east bank of the Euphrates and briefly controls Deir ez-Zor city following Syrian Army withdrawal towards Damascus.; HTS-led opposition forces seize the cities of Deir ez-Zor, Mayadin and Abu Kamal by 11 December.

Belligerents
Syrian Democratic Forces; Supported by: CJTF–OIR; United States	(Syria) Syrian Arab Republic (surrendered); Supported by: Russia (until 30 November); Iran (until 6 December)	Islamic State	Syrian opposition (since 9 December)

Units involved
Syrian Democratic Forces; People's Protection Units; Women's Protection Units; Deir ez-Zor Military Council; Self-Defense Forces; Asayish; United States Armed Forces; United States Air Force	Syrian Arab Armed Forces (Ba'athist Syria) (surrendered); Syrian Army (surrendered); Pro-Iranian militias; Hashemiyoun; 47th regiment; Hezbollah Iraq; Liwa Fatemiyoun; Popular Mobilization Forces; Islamic Resistance in Iraq	Military of the Islamic State	Military Operations Command: Tahrir al-Sham; (Syria) Al-Busraya Revolutionaries (Syria) Burkan al-Furat

Casualties and losses
10 killed (Note: 6 before the offensive, 1 on December 3rd, 3 on December 17-19)	12 killed (Note: 6 before the offensive, 6 on December 3rd) (Iran) 2 killed (Note: before the offensive)	(Islamic State) 2 killed (Islamic State) 18 arrested (SDF claim)	Several protesters killed (allegedly)
- 1 civilian killed (Note: offensive phase)

In the days leading up to and during the 2024 Syrian opposition offensives, several military clashes involving ISIS cells, Syrian rebel forces, Ba'athist Syrian government forces, and US-led international coalition forces involving the United Kingdom, France, Jordan, Turkey, Canada, Australia, and others, occurred in Deir ez-Zor Governorate. These events prompted significant military responses from both Russian forces and Assad regime's troops.

On 3 December 2024, the Syrian Democratic Forces (SDF), supported by the US-led CJTF–OIR coalition, launched an offensive on pro-government forces in the eastern Deir ez-Zor region.

== Background ==
After the territorial collapse of the Islamic State in early 2019, the group's fighters began an insurgency in eastern Syria. What followed was a long series of ISIS attacks and raids against both SDF and SAA forces.

In late November 2024 a HTS-led coalition launched a country wide offensive against government forces. The Syrian opposition managed to advance into the Homs Governorate heading east in the direction of Deir ez-Zor by early December. At the same time, the US-backed Free Syrian Army from the Al-Tanf area managed to capture Palmyra on 7 December.

=== Initial clashes with ISIS ===
ISIS cells killed a member of the SDF and injured others at a security checkpoint on 17 November. Two days later, a United States Air Force strike on Iranian-aligned militia compounds in Al-Qoriya Desert, Deir ez-Zor Governorate, killed five militia troops. Additional operations targeted militia positions in Al-Quriyah, Mayadin, and Al-Asharah, following an Iranian missile impact near their Al-Shaddadi base in Al-Hasakah Governorate. Earlier in November, the US-led international coalition conducted four live-ammunition exercises at the Al-Omar Oil Field base, their largest Syrian installation, and another at the Al-Tanf base near the Syria-Iraq-Jordan border area.

On 21 November, ISIS conducted an IED attack which killed two SDF fighters and injured 12 others in Deir Ezzor. On 23 November, ISIS cells ambushed a Syrian Arab Army (SAA) position in Al-Bushri desert, killing a lieutenant and soldier. ISIS cells also ambushed a position in the Al-Ma'ezalyah area of the Abu Kamal desert, killing two Iranian Revolutionary Guard Corps troops and injuring two other soldiers. On 24 November, ISIS operatives attacked and killed two SDF fighters and severely injured one after detonating a road land mine in Ghariba Al-Sharqiya Village within the Al-Sawr district of northern Deir ez-Zor. On 25 November, ISIS operatives conducted two separate attacks in western Deir ez-Zor Governorate. The first incident involved ISIS members on motorcycles engaging in an armed confrontation with Al-Asayish Internal Security Forces along Al-Khorafy Road near Abu Khashab. While the encounter involved machine gun fire, no casualties were reported. In a separate incident on the same day, ISIS militants conducted a fatal attack near Al-Makman, resulting in the death of an oil tank driver.

In response, Russian air forces executed multiple precision strikes against ISIS desert positions on 27 November 2024. These operations targeted specific locations including Al-Boshra Mountain in western Deir ez-Zor and positions within Al-Rasafa in the Al-Raqqa countryside. On the same day, gunmen of ISIS cells fired upon a SDF checkpoint located in Al-Hawayej Town with machine guns. The following day, ISIS operatives riding a motorcycle fired automatic weapons at the first brigade of the Self-Defense Forces in Al-Jurthi town, located in eastern Deir ez-Zor province, resulting in return fire with no known casualties. A US-led international coalition military exercise involving fighter jets took place at the United States military base at the Koniko gas field in northern Deir ez-Zor. These exercises generated notable acoustic signatures in the surrounding area due to the intensity of the operations. On 29 November, unidentified aircraft conducted precision strikes against positions associated with Iranian-aligned forces in the Ma'izila Desert region of Abu Kamal, situated along the Iraq–Syria border.

Iranian-aligned militias significantly expanded their military presence and security operations in Abu Kamal amid heightened regional tensions and following U.S. military actions against militia positions in the region. The militias established new checkpoint systems at the city's entry and exit points, with increased patrol activities in secondary streets.

Notable reinforcements arrived from several affiliated groups, including Hezbollah Iraq, the Popular Mobilization Forces, and the Fatemiyoun militia, concentrating their presence in the Al-Thalathaat region near the Iraq-Syria border. The deployed forces conducted nocturnal training exercises, including live-fire drills directed toward desert areas in preparation for potential military actions from forces stationed at the Al-Tanf base hosting international coalition forces. The reinforcements followed a 27 November U.S. Central Command precision strike against a militia weapons storage facility in Syria.

=== Russian withdrawal ===
On 30 November, Russian forces executed a coordinated withdrawal of military equipment and personnel from multiple headquarters across the Seven Villages area, relocating these assets to Deir ez-Zor city. The withdrawal encompassed positions in Al-Husseiniyah, Al-Salihiyah, Hatla, Mrat, Mazloum, Khasham, and Tabiyet Jazira, all situated on the eastern bank of the Euphrates. The withdrawal prompted strategic responses from multiple actors, including the SDF, which consolidated its forces in the industrial zones adjacent to the affected area. US-led international coalition forces, operating from Koniko Gas Field, conducted artillery operations targeting positions in Marrat and Khasham towns within the Seven Villages region. The General Security Directorate was able to arrest an ISIS emir in the town of Al-Izba, north of Deir ez-Zor. The emir was responsible for several recent bombings and assassinations in the town.

== Offensive ==
The Syrian Democratic Forces (SDF), launched an offensive on pro-government forces near the towns of Khasham and Al-Salihiyah in the eastern Syrian province of Deir ez-Zor on 3 December. They managed to capture the village of Al-Hussainiyah. CJTF–OIR coalition aircraft provided support to the SDF, by targeting Iran-backed militias in the region. An SDF fighter and a civilian were killed in clashes with SAA. The SDF claimed to have captured the 7 villages under SAA control on the east bank of the Euphrates; Salhiya, Tabiya, Hatla, Khasham, Marat, Mazloum, and Husseiniya, and were incorporating them into the Deir ez-Zor Military Council. A US airstrike killed six SAA soldiers near Deir ez-Zor airport.

Two days later, the SDF captured the Thawra oil field, the town of Resafa and strategic locations near Safyan, and Anbaj areas, located in the Raqqa Governorate, following the withdrawal of pro-government forces. The next day, pro-government forces also began withdrawing from the cities of Deir ez-Zor, Mayadin, Al-Quriyah and Abu Kamal, towards the capital Damascus. Shortly after the government withdrawal, SDF forces crossed the Euphrates river to enter the city of Deir ez-Zor and took full control of it by the end of the day. Further south, the SDF also seized Abu Kamal near the Iraqi border.

Anti-SDF protests erupted in Deir ez-Zor calling for the Syrian transitional government to take control over the city. Arab elements within the SDF reportedly started to defect to the Fateh Mubin operations room. On 10 December, the opposition announced the capture of border city of Abu Kamal. To avoid a major confrontation between the SDF and HTS, the SDF forces pulled back to the right side of the Euphrates river bank. This resulted in full HTS-led control of Deir ez-Zor city by the end of 11 December.

== Aftermath ==
A SDF fighter was killed by ISIS attack in Deir Ezzor on 17 December. On the same day, two SDF fighters were killed and four others wounded by ISIS attack on checkpoint in Al-Raqqa. On 20 December, two ISIS fighters were killed in a US airstrike in Deir Ezzor.

On 20 January 2025, local gunmen crossed the Euphrates and attacked SDF checkpoints and headquarters in the towns of Diban and Abu Hamam. The group later pledged allegiance to the tribal led by Sheikh Ibrahim al Hafl, who has called for an Arab uprising against the SDF. In response, the SDF engaged the tribal fighters and sent additional reinforcements from Al-Hasakah towards Deir ez-Zor. At the end of the next day, the SDF successfully reclaimed all lost positions. The following week the SDF launched a security operation resulting in several arrests.

== See also ==
- 2024 Syrian opposition offensives
  - Northwestern Syria offensive (2024)
  - Southern Syria offensive (2024)
  - Palmyra offensive (2024)
- DAANES–Syria relations
- Battle of Khasham
- Deir ez-Zor clashes (2023)
- YPG–FSA relations
