= 2017 Mayadin offensive =

Military operation

- Part of the Eastern Syria campaign and the Russian military intervention in the Syrian civil war
Date	4–17 October 2017 (1 week and 6 days)
Location	Mayadin District, Deir ez-Zor Governorate, Syria
Result	Decisive Syrian Army Victory
Territorial changes	Syrian Army captures the city of Mayadin, IS's new de facto capital city, on 14 October

Belligerents
(Syria) Syrian Arab Republic Russia	Islamic State

Commanders and leaders
(Syria) Maj. Gen. Suheil al-Hassan (Operations chief commander)	Unknown

Units involved
Syrian Armed Forces: Syrian Army; Republican Guard; 4th Armoured Division; 5th Corps; Tiger Forces; Syrian Air Force; Russian Armed Forces: Aerospace Forces; Special operations forces advisors	Military of the Islamic State

Casualties and losses
38+ killed (per SOHR)	180+ killed (per Russia)

The 2017 Mayadin offensive was a military offensive launched by the Syrian Arab Army against members of the Islamic State (IS) in the Deir ez-Zor Governorate, following the breaking of the three-year siege of the city of Deir ez-Zor. The Mayadin offensive, conducted by Syrian Army troops, was conducted with the aim of capturing IS's new de facto capital of Mayadin, and securing the villages and towns around it.

The offensive was concurrent with the Raqqa campaign conducted by the Syrian Democratic Forces (SDF) against IS's former de facto capital city and stronghold in Syria, as well as the Western Anbar campaign in Iraq.

== The offensive ==
The Syrian military advanced within 10 kilometers of ISIL's stronghold of Mayadin on 4 October. Concurrently, pro-opposition monitoring group Syrian Observatory for Human Rights claimed that Russian or Syrian airstrikes killed between 38 and 67 civilians who were crossing the Euphrates by boat near Mayadin. The next day, the Republican Guard, 4th Mechanized Division and 5th Legion made more steady advances, putting them within six kilometers of the city.

Syrian soldiers pushed into the city on 6 October from the west. The following day, government sources claimed roughly half of Mayadin was taken by the Syrian Army, while the airport was also taken. Throughout the day, a wave of Russian airstrikes against IS positions near Mayadin and close to the Iraqi border reportedly killed 180 IS militants, including a large number of foreign fighters. By 8 October, IS forces were reportedly encircled within the city. However, the next day, an IS counterattack managed to push back Syrian Army troops from Mayadin, with 38 soldiers being killed.

On 10 October 2017, fighting began in the suburbs in preparation to storm the city, according to a source citing SANA. On 11 October, the Syrian Army started encircling Mayadin, with the city surrounded by the following day. The Syrian Army then pushed into the western and northern parts of the city, capturing four neighborhoods.

On 14 October 2017, the Syrian Army captured Mayadin city. On the next day, elite Syrian Tiger Forces pushed through much rural territory of Mayadin and made advances towards town of Al-Asharah, reaching its outskirts. By 17 October, all besieged land between Deir ez-Zor and Mayadin along the Euphrates was captured by the Tiger Forces.

== Aftermath ==
By 20 October, the Syrian Army had crossed the Euphrates, capturing the village of Dhiban, and just hours later reaching the outskirts of the massive Al-Omar Oil Field complex, the largest such oil field in Syria, which in the pre-war era had contributed one quarter of Syria's oil production. In a surprise move, IS fighters defending Al-Omar Oil Field launched a powerful counterattack on the government bridgehead at Dhiban, forcing government forces to retreat back to the west bank of the Euphrates. During the same day, the Syrian Army advanced southwards from Mayadin, capturing the city of Al-Quriyah.

== See also ==
- Battle of Mosul (2016–2017)
- Battle of Raqqa (2017)
