= Wagner Group activities in Syria =

Russian paramilitary group operations

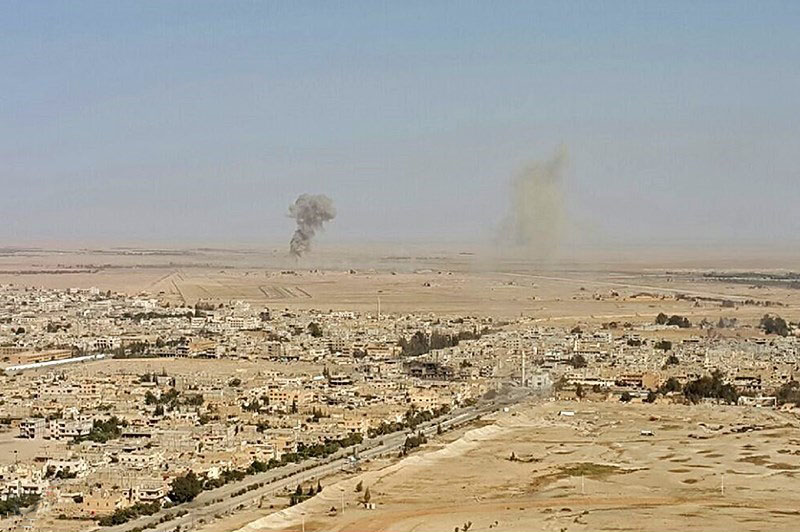
Wagner mercenaries took part in the March 2016 Palmyra offensive.

The Wagner Group is a private military company (PMC) with ties to the Russian state under Vladimir Putin that had conducted operations in Syria since late 2015. Their presence in the country had been reported as late as 2021.

== Arrival and capture of Palmyra and al-Shaer ==
The presence of the PMCs in Syria was first reported in late October 2015, almost a month after the start of the Russian military intervention in the country's civil war, when between three and nine PMCs were killed in a rebel mortar attack on their position in Latakia province. It was reported that the Wagner Group was employed by the Russian Defense Ministry, even though private military companies are illegal in Russia. The Russian Defense Ministry dismissed the early reports by The Wall Street Journal about the Wagner Group's operations in Syria as an "information attack". However, sources within the Russian FSB and the Defense Ministry unofficially stated for RBTH that Wagner was supervised by the GRU.

Furthermore, according to a few Wagner fighters, they were flown to Syria aboard Russian military transport planes. Others were transported to Syria by the Syrian Cham Wings airline from the Rostov-on-Don Airport, with 51 round trips being made between January 2017 and March 2018. Their equipment was delivered to Syria via the so-called Syrian Express, a fleet of Russian military and civilian merchant ships that had been delivering supplies to Syria since 2012. Later, a Defense Ministry source told RBK TV that the FSB was also directing the PMCs. The usage of Wagner had reportedly cost Russia 170 million dollars by August 2016.

By July 2017, according to The New York Times, the Kremlin established a policy in Syria where companies that seize oil and gas wells, as well as mines, from ISIL forces would get oil and mining rights for those same sites. Two Russian companies received contracts under this policy by this time, with one employing the Wagner Group to secure those sites from the militants. Later, it was revealed that the company would receive 25 percent of the proceeds from oil and gas production at fields its PMCs captured and secured from ISIL. Some reports stated that the contracts with Damascus were established after Wagner lost the trust and financing of the Russian Defense Ministry in early 2016. As of early August 2017, the number of Wagner employees in Syria was reported to have reached 5,000, after the arrival of an additional 2,000 PMCs, including Chechens and Ingush.

Wagner PMCs were involved in both Palmyra offensives in 2016 and 2017, as well as the Syrian Army's campaign in central Syria in the summer of 2017 and the Battle of Deir ez-Zor in late 2017. They were in the role of frontline advisors, fire and movement coordinators and forward air controllers who provided guidance to close air support. When they arrived in Syria the PMCs received T-72 tanks, BM-21 Grad MLRs and 122 mm D-30 howitzers. During the first Palmyra offensive, according to one of the contractors, the PMCs were used as "cannon fodder" and most of the work was conducted by them, with the regular Syrian Army, who he described as "chickens", only finishing the job. An expert on Russian security at the IIR, Mark Galeotti, said they served as "shock troops" alongside the Syrian Army.

Following the successful conclusion of the offensive, during which 32 of the contractors were reportedly killed and about 80 wounded, the PMCs were withdrawn between April and May 2016, and they surrendered all of their heavy weapons and military equipment. When they returned for the second Palmyra offensive and to capture ISIL-held oil fields at the beginning of 2017, the PMCs reportedly faced a shortage of weapons and equipment as they were issued only older assault rifles, machine guns, T-62 tanks and M-30 howitzers. Several sniper rifles and grenade launchers were delivered a few weeks later, which did not solve the issue.

According to Fontanka, the equipment problems in combination with a reported reduction in the quality of its personnel led to Wagner suffering a significantly higher number of casualties in the second battle for Palmyra than the first one. Between 40 and 60 were reported killed and between 80 and 180 were wounded. The Russian investigative blogger group the Conflict Intelligence Team (CIT) attributed the higher losses mainly to ISIL's heavy use of suicide-bombers and the militant group's unwillingness to negotiate. Still, the second offensive also ended in a victory for pro-government forces.

Besides fighting ISIL militants, according to RBK TV, the PMCs trained a Syrian Army unit called the ISIS Hunters, which was also fully funded and trained by Russian special forces. The ISIS Hunters were one of the leading units during the capture of the al-Shaer gas fields from ISIL in late April 2017, as part of the 2017 Eastern Homs offensive. However, as of the beginning of July, the PMCs were still fighting to secure the al-Shaer gas fields and the areas of the phosphate mines. Still, in mid-September, the al-Shaer gas fields started getting back into production. Subsequently, the PMCs were in charge of guarding the refineries, with ISIL occasionally making attempts to retake the fields, each time being beaten back. During one attack, a PMC was tortured to death by ISIL.

== Killing of Muhammad Abdullah al-Ismail ==
In early July 2017, a video emerged that showed Wagner PMCs bludgeoning a man who was initially believed to be a captured ISIL militant in the Palmyra area.

More than two years later, full footage was uploaded to a closed VKontakte group for members of Wagner with new information asserting that the killed person was a Syrian Army soldier who had deserted. The contractors also accused the man, named Muhammad Abdullah al-Ismail (or Mohammed Taha Ismail Al-Abdullah a.k.a. Hamdi Bouta) from the village of Alkhorayta in Deir ez-Zor, of being a jihadist for wanting to desert. Ismail had fled Syria earlier in the war for Lebanon, before returning in 2017, after which he was arrested and forcibly conscripted into the Syrian military. After he was killed, his body was mutilated and burned. In the video of the killing, a second severed head of an unidentified person could be seen lying on the ground.

A Russian independent media report identified one of the perpetrators as Stanislav Yevgenyevich Dychko, a confirmed operative of the Wagner Group who previously worked for the Russian Interior Ministry. A second one was identified as a former soldier named Ruslan from Bryansk, currently employed as a "patriotic educator" in local schools. Arab media also established the place of the murder to be the al-Shaer oilfield near Homs. Further investigation by Russian media in December 2019 identified the remaining perpetrators as Vladimir B., Dzhakhongyr M. ("Pamir"), Ruslan ("Chichi") and Vladislav Apostol, who was killed in Syria in February 2018. The Novaya Gazeta newspaper sent the material from its investigation into the killing to the office of the Prosecutor General of Russia, as well as the Investigative Committee of Russia, however no criminal cases were opened as a result.

In March 2021, human rights lawyers from three nongovernmental organizations representing the killed person's brother filed a lawsuit in Moscow against six Wagner Group PMCs accused of the killing. In December 2021, the Council of the European Union sanctioned Utkin for the killing, stating in a resolution that "According to a former member of the Wagner Group, Dmitry Utkin personally ordered the torturing to death of the deserter as well as the filming of the act."

== Push into Deir ez-Zor and clearing of Hama ==
In mid-September 2017, the PMCs helped Syrian troops to capture the town of Uqayribat from ISIL in the central Hama province. Several PMCs were killed during the fighting for the town and their bodies were seized by the militants. One week later, the PMCs, along with regular Russian troops, supported Syrian government forces in repelling a HTS-led rebel offensive north of Hama. At the end of that month, during an ISIL counter-offensive in the Deir ez-Zor Governorate, two Wagner PMCs were captured by the militants. Initially, the Kremlin attempted to distance itself from the two, while a brother of one of them accused the Russian government of rejecting them.

Subsequently, the Syrian ISIS Hunters unit pledged to pay one million dollars for the release of each of the captive Russians. However, the ISIS Hunters also said they would execute 100 captive militants for each of the Russians if they were killed by the jihadists. At the same time, a Russian parliamentary official stated that the two had almost certainly been executed, presumably for refusing to reject their Christian Orthodox religion, reject Russia, become Muslims and join the militant group. This claim was questioned by the CIT, who pointed out that there had been no reports of this effect from the militants' sources.

In late October 2017, a video emerged on YouTube glorifying the PMCs actions in Syria. Between the end of October and the start of November, Wagner took part in the Battle of Deir ez-Zor where they cleared the remaining ISIL militants from the districts of Al-Rashidiyah and Al-Ardi, as well as the Al-Bazh and Abu-Adad neighborhoods, along with the Syrian Army. Three or four companies of Wagner PMCs were involved in the fighting. Syrian government forces took complete control of the city by 3 November. A besieged pocket of ISIL militants remained on an island in the city's outskirts, which soon came under attack. As government forces advanced, the pro-opposition SOHR reported that Russia demanded the release of the two captive PMCs during negotiations with the trapped militants.

On 17 November, the last ISIL fighters on the island had surrendered, leaving the Syrian Army in control of all territory surrounding Deir ez-Zor city. However, the two PMCs were still prisoners. At the end of November, it was reported that the Russian military was negotiating for the release of the two PMCs who were reportedly being held on the border of Syria and Iraq. However, on 4 December, the ISIS Hunters reported they had killed the commander of the ISIL militants that had captured and executed the two PMCs. The same day, a Wagner representative notified the parents of one of the two that both had died in captivity.

At the end of November, Russia announced plans to withdraw some of its troops from Syria by the end of the year. It was reported that to avoid potential security losses, Russia would fill the void with private military companies, including Wagner. On 11 December, Putin declared victory against "terrorists" during a visit to Russia's Khmeimim air base in Syria.

Ruslan Pukhov, the director of the Moscow-based Centre for Analysis of Strategies and Technologies think tank, stated the usage of PMCs was one of the factors that contributed to Russia's victory in Syria. He pointed out that Russia managed to remove the need for deploying large numbers of ground forces by bringing in the Russian PMCs who, unlike American PMCs who were usually only in support roles, were used as highly capable assault troops and that they were often embedded with Syrian units to increase their fighting ability. He also pointed out that the Russian public proved completely indifferent to the losses suffered by the PMCs, believing that "these people are highly paid, and knew what they were getting into".

In December 2017, the PMCs took part in the Syrian Army's offensive into Idlib province against mostly HTS rebel forces. As part of the same campaign in the northwest of Syria, in early February 2018, the PMCs helped in the capture of several villages in the northeastern countryside of Hama from IS. Between 3 and 7 February, pro-government forces seized at least 25 villages, shrinking the IS pocket in that part of the country by a reported 80 percent. The pocket was cleared on 9 February.

== Battle of Khasham ==
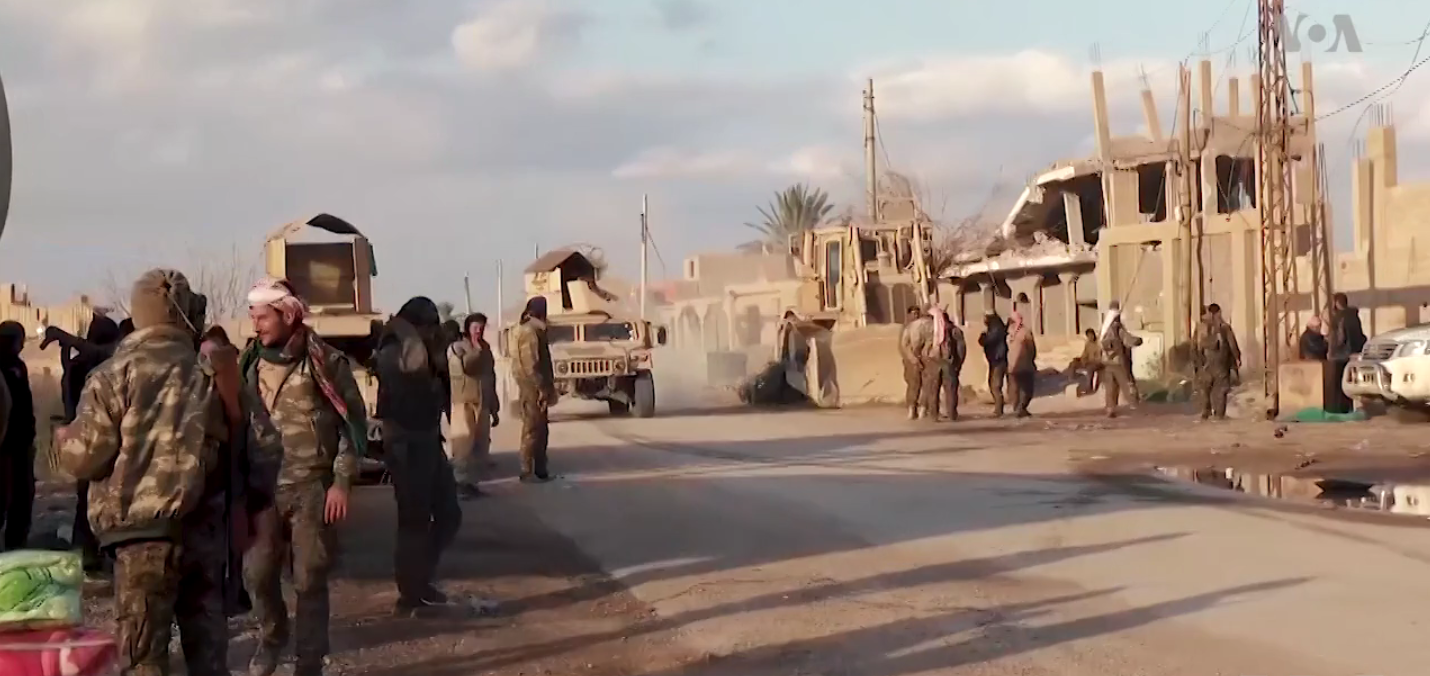
Syrian Democratic Forces in Baghuz south west of Khaasham, five days after the battle.

At about 10 pm, local time, on 7 February 2018, a battle began near the Syrian town of Khasham in the Deir ez-Zor Governorate, between pro-Syrian government forces and the Kurdish-led SDF, supported by the U.S. military. During the clashes, U.S. aircraft attacked Syrian troops, killing 45 to 100 government fighters.

A Russian newspaper, citing Russian military and contractor sources, reported pro-government forces were attempting to capture the ConocoPhillips (locally called Al Tabiyeh) gas field from the SDF. According to two U.S. defense officials, the U.S. military assessed that Russian PMCs also participated in the assault, with one saying some of the contractors had been killed in the air-strikes. A Kurdish militia commander and an ex-Russian officer also claimed Russian contractors suffered casualties during the fighting.

On 19 February 2018, a publication by the Ukraine-based Inform Napalm alleged the battle was planned and cleared with the Russian military command by Sergey Kim, the chief of Wagner's operations department and a former Russian Marine officer. An official statement by the ISIS Hunters unit stated they had received intelligence that ISIL forces were moving towards Khasham and government forces decided to move from the Euphrates so as to cut off ISIL's line of attack. At this point, armed groups were spotted east of Khasham, in SDF-held territory, which then attacked the government's troops. The groups were quickly pushed back. The military claimed that, according to intercepted radio traffic, the groups were partly ISIL and partly Kurds, and retreated towards the Conoco factory. At this point, pro-government units were hit by air-strikes.

According to Germany's Der Spiegel, the ferocious American response was primarily triggered by a unit of Syrian tribal militia and Shiite fighters moving from the town of Al Tabiyeh towards Khasham, concurrently with another group of pro-government forces that had crossed the Euphrates River near the Deir ez-Zor Airport advancing towards Khasham from the village of Marrat. Der Spiegel reported no Russians were in either formation; yet there was a small contingent of Russian PMCs stationed in Al Tabiyeh, who were not participating in the fighting. Similarly, the SOHR activist organization reported that the Russian PMCs, who were accompanying government forces as they advanced towards the SDF-held oil and gas fields, were killed at Al Tabiyeh. Furthermore, the SOHR stated they were not killed in the air-strikes, but instead in a booby-trapped explosion at an arms depot.

Several days after the battle, various Russian groups started confirming a number of Wagner PMCs had been killed in the air-strikes. Some posts on Russian social media made claims of over 200 Russian PMCs being killed, although the veracity of this information was questioned and could not be confirmed. A Russian paramilitary chief, critical of the killed contractors, also claimed 218 PMCs were killed and that the families were still waiting for their remains. A Russian military doctor, a leader of a PMC-linked paramilitary Cossack organization, a source with ties to Wagner and the Ukrainian SBU claimed 80–100 PMCs were killed and 100–200 wounded. The SBU further named 64 of the PMCs. A Russian journalist believed between 20 and 25 PMCs died in the strikes, while similarly CIT estimated a total of between 20 and 30 had died.

The Novaya Gazeta reported a Russian death toll of 13, while the ataman of the Baltic separate Cossack District, Maxim Buga, stated no more than 15–20 died and that the other estimates were exaggerations. On 19 February, one of Wagner's leaders, Andrei Troshev, was quoted as saying 14 "volunteers" died in the battle. Three other Wagner commanders also stated the claim of 200 dead was an exaggeration and that 15 PMCs were killed at the most. Russia officially confirmed five presumably Russian citizens had been killed in the air-strikes. Der Spiegel and the SOHR reported mostly Syrians were killed in the strikes.

As of late March, the PMCs remained in the same area and were using local pro-government troops to scout coalition positions. According to former Wagner members, the battle at Khasham had an impact that lead to changes to the organization, with the PMCs subsequently being given only guard duties at the local plants.

== Securing of Damascus ==
On 18 February 2018, the Syrian military launched an offensive against the rebel-held Eastern Ghouta, east of Damascus, and split the region into three separate pockets by 12 March.

As of 17 March, 82 percent of Eastern Ghouta was captured by the Syrian Army. One of the towns captured by government troops during this time was Mesraba. On 18 March, the rebels launched a counter-attack in an attempt to recapture Mesraba and quickly seized most of the town from government forces. Wagner PMCs then reportedly launched an operation and during the night between 18 and 19 March, fully recaptured Mesraba.

Another mission they were charged with during the offensive was to secure the humanitarian corridor established by the Russian Reconciliation Center for Syria that allowed civilians to leave rebel-held areas for government territory. According to the center, 79,702 people had left rebel-held parts of Eastern Ghouta as of 19 March. By 23 March, the SOHR put the number of those who left rebel areas or remained in two towns seized by government forces at 120,000, while the UN stated 50,000 had left the besieged areas. The whole Eastern Ghouta region was captured by government forces on 14 April, effectively ending the near 7-year rebellion near Damascus.

In March, an anonymous senior commander of the Wagner Group was quoted as saying that there were five Wagner companies operating in Syria, as well as The Carpathians (Russian: Карпаты, romanized: Karpaty) company attached to Wagner, composed mainly of Ukrainian citizens. The Carpathians consisted of about 100 fighters. In May, the SBU announced it identified Lieutenant Colonel Oleg Demyanenko of the Russian Armed Forces as the Carpathians' trainer. According to the announcement, the unit was formed to conduct reconnaissance and attacks in Ukraine. Belarusians were also said to be among Wagner's contractors.

== Post-major combat ==
As of the end of November 2018, the PMCs were conducting very few combat missions. Instead, they were stationed at facilities and it was stated that during the past summer a company trained for three months at a base, 70 kilometers from Deir ez-Zor, for riot control.

At the start of May 2019, it was reported Wagner snipers were being deployed along the Idlib frontline in northwest Syria in anticipation of a Syrian Army offensive. The ground offensive was launched on 6 May, after a week-long aerial campaign against rebel territory, with pro-government troops managing to capture two major towns within three days. Photos and videos appeared to show at least one Russian PMC accompanying Syrian troops into one of the towns. Members of the Russian special forces were also present during the offensive.

In early September, the PMC's were preparing for an offensive to assault the rebel-held city of Idlib. They have grouped into 50-man tank-equipped units supported by Russian air forces. While working with regular Syrian government forces, they were first to establish civilian evacuation corridors and then engage in the attack on the city.

On 15 October 2019, Syrian government forces entered the city of Manbij and its surrounding countryside, as US military forces started a withdrawal from the area, which was completed by the end of the day. Subsequently, the Russian military started patrols between rebel and government-held areas in the Manbij district. It was thought that Wagner PMCs were involved in the taking over of an abandoned US military base in the area, due to the confirmed presence of a Russian journalist who was known to regularly follow the contractors.

In mid-January 2020, tense standoffs started with US troops blocking Russian military vehicles from using the M4 highway in northeastern Syria. Almost half a dozen incidents took place towards the end of the month. In early February, vehicles carrying Russian contractors were also blocked by US troops on the highways. According to the US, the incidents took place deep inside territory patrolled by their military and the Kurdish-led SDF.

As of early February, PMCs were posted at the frontline in the Al-Ghab Plain of Hama province. In April, the Wagner-linked Russian security contractor "Evro Polis" delivered 50 ventilators, 10,000 coronavirus test kits, and 2,000 items of protective clothing to Syria amid the coronavirus pandemic. At the end of December 2020, ISIL attacks intensified in eastern Syria, after the PMCs reportedly withdrew from Deir ez-Zor province to Latakia.

In late December 2021, Wagner PMCs took part in a large-scale military operation against ISIL cells in the Syrian desert.

On 15 March 2023, the Syrian Observatory for Human Rights said that 266 Russian PMCs were killed in Syria during the civil war.

== Sources ==
- Parker, John W. (2017). Putin's Syrian Gambit: Sharper Elbows, Bigger Footprint, Stickier Wicket. Institute for National Strategic Studies Strategic Perspectives, No. 25. Washington, D.C.: National Defense University Press. ISBN 9780160939983.
