= Al-Kishmah, Deir ez-Zor =

Syrian village located in Deir ez-Zor Governorate

Al-Kishmah الكشمة
- Village
- Location within Syria
- Coordinates: 34°48′47″N 40°37′50″E
- Country: Syria
- Governorate: Deir ez-Zor
- District: Mayadin
- Subdistrict: Al-Asharah
- Elevation: 209 m (686 ft)

Population (2004)
  - Total: 8,749
- Time zone: UTC+3 (AST)

Al-Kishmah (Arabic: الكشمة) is a village located in Al-Asharah Subdistrict, Mayadin District, Deir ez-Zor Governorate, Syria. Its population is 8,749 according to the 2004 census.

== Geography ==
Al-Kishmah is located on the western bank of the Euphrates River, about 13 kilometers southeast of the subdistrict capital Al-Asharah. Its average elevation is at 209 meters above the sea level.

== Climate ==
Al-Kishmah has a Hot Desert Climate (BWh). On average, it sees the most precipitation in January, with 26 mm of rainfall. From June to September, However, the village sees virtually no precipitation.

Climate data for Al-Kishmah
Month	Jan	Feb	Mar	Apr	May	Jun	Jul	Aug	Sep	Oct	Nov	Dec	Year
Mean daily maximum °C (°F)	13.3 (55.9)	16.3 (61.3)	21.8 (71.2)	27.3 (81.1)	33.1 (91.6)	37.9 (100.2)	40.8 (105.4)	40.6 (105.1)	36.2 (97.2)	29.7 (85.5)	20.4 (68.7)	14.5 (58.1)	27.7 (81.8)
Daily mean °C (°F)	8.1 (46.6)	10.8 (51.4)	15.7 (60.3)	21.1 (70.0)	26.9 (80.4)	31.6 (88.9)	34.2 (93.6)	34 (93)	29.8 (85.6)	23.8 (74.8)	14.8 (58.6)	9.4 (48.9)	21.7 (71.0)
Mean daily minimum °C (°F)	3.5 (38.3)	5.4 (41.7)	9.2 (48.6)	14.1 (57.4)	19.5 (67.1)	24.2 (75.6)	26.7 (80.1)	26.7 (80.1)	23.1 (73.6)	17.6 (63.7)	9.5 (49.1)	4.9 (40.8)	15.4 (59.7)
Average rainfall mm (inches)	26 (1.0)	21 (0.8)	20 (0.8)	13 (0.5)	6 (0.2)	0 (0)	0 (0)	0 (0)	0 (0)	10 (0.4)	18 (0.7)	24 (0.9)	138 (5.3)
Source: Climate-Data.org
