= Battle of Khasham =

2018 battle of the Syrian Civil War

Battle of Conoco Fields (Battle of Khasham)
- Part of the 2017–2019 Deir ez-Zor campaign of the Syrian civil war
- Hatched box shows location of clashes Territorial control in February 2018: Syrian Arab Republic Syrian Democratic Forces
Date	7–8 February 2018 (1 day)
Location	near Khasham, Deir ez-Zor Governorate, Syria 35°20′10″N 40°18′34″E
Result	American and Syrian Democratic Forces victory

Belligerents
United States; Syrian Democratic Forces	(Syria) Syrian Arab Republic; Liwa Fatemiyoun; Liwa Zainebiyoun; (Russia) Wagner Group

Commanders and leaders
(United States) Jim Mattis; (United States) Paul E. Funk II; (United States) Jeffrey L. Harrigian; (United States) Jonathan P. Braga	Unknown

Units involved
YPG; United States Armed Forces; U.S. Army; 1st SFOD-D; United States Army Special Forces; 75th Ranger Regiment; 101st Airborne Division; U.S. Marines; U.S. Air Force	(Syria) Syrian government forces; 4th Division; National Defense Forces; Baqir Brigade; Wagner Group; 5 Storm unit; ISIS Hunters

Strength
40 American troops; US aircraft and artillery: F-22 fighter jets; F-15E strike fighters; B-52 bombers; AC-130 gunships; AH-64 Apache attack helicopters; MQ-9 Reaper unmanned combat aerial vehicles; RQ-7B Shadow unmanned aerial vehicles; M777 howitzer artillery; M142 HIMARS rocket artillery	500 Syrian and Russian troops 27 total vehicles, including T-72 tanks

Casualties and losses
(United States) None; 1 SDF fighter wounded	Syrian claim: 55 killed; U.S. claim: Approximately 100–200 killed; SOHR claim: 68 killed; Unofficial Russian claims: 80–100 killed, 200 wounded; University of Southern Denmark: 65–200 Russians killed; BBC News Russian: 80 Russians killed

The Battle of Khasham, also known as the Battle of Conoco Fields, was a military engagement of the Syrian civil war fought on 7 February 2018 near the towns of Khasham and Al Tabiyeh in the Deir ez-Zor Governorate, Syria. The Operation Inherent Resolve coalition delivered air and artillery strikes on Syrian Armed Forces and pro-government militias after they reportedly engaged a U.S. military and Syrian Democratic Forces (SDF) position in the region.

The US Central Command alleged that pro-government forces had "initiated an unprovoked attack against well-established Syrian Democratic Forces headquarters" in the area, while coalition service members were "co-located with SDF partners during the attack 8 kilometers (5 mi) east of the agreed-upon Euphrates River de-confliction line". The Russian Ministry of Defence's statement, released on 8 February 2018, referred to the incident at the village of Salihiyah (located south of the SDF-held town of Abu Hamam in the Abu Kamal District) and said that it was caused by reconnaissance actions of Syrian militias that had not been cleared with the Russian operations command; the statement stressed that there were no Russian service members in the "designated district of the Deir ez-Zor province of Syria".

The number of pro-Syrian government troops—particularly the number of Russian mercenaries—has been the subject of debate. Shortly after the fighting, the American officials estimated that around 100 Syrian troops had been killed in the fighting, with some reports of Russian mercenaries among the dead. As unconfirmed accounts of casualties among Russian Wagner Group mercenaries in the strike emerged, the incident was billed by media as "the first deadly clash between citizens of Russia and the United States since the Cold War".

Reporting by Der Spiegel and the official Russian position hold that U.S. troops repelling a Syrian attack "happened to kill 20–30 Russians", while the Syrian Observatory for Human Rights (SOHR) believed there were some Russian casualties caused by a nearby booby-trap unrelated to the assault. However, other news organizations and American official estimates ranged up to a "couple of hundred" Russians killed. The Ukrainian Security Service of Ukraine identified 65 Russians as killed through open-source intelligence. A report published by the University of Southern Denmark in 2019 which referred to claims made by Der Spiegel's report, official Russian and American statements, and other sources estimated "that 65–200 Russians (of which a few may have been Russian special operators assisting or leading the Wagnerites) died as a result of the fighting, some in the field, and some in hospital beds in Syria and Russia".

== Background ==
In September 2014, the United States began to undertake efforts to establish a global coalition with the declared aim of countering the Islamic State of Iraq and the Levant. Since September 2014, the U.S. had conducted military operations in Syria, primarily against ISIL forces as part of Operation Inherent Resolve. The primary U.S.-backed force in the northeastern part of Syria is the Syrian Democratic Forces, a group composed predominantly of Kurdish and Arab militiamen. In 2017, backed by U.S. forces, the SDF captured Raqqa from the Islamic State and then advanced to the Euphrates River, where a deconfliction line was established by the governments of the United States and Russia.

On several occasions, U.S. forces struck Syrian pro-government units operating in the area. In November 2017, the U.S. government made it known that they were expanding their goals in Syria beyond routing ISIL forces, to pressure the Syrian government to make concessions at the Geneva talks. This intent was, in mid-January 2018, clearly broadcast by Secretary of State Rex Tillerson, who said the Trump administration would maintain an open-ended military presence in Syria to counter Iranian influence and ensure the departure of Syrian President Bashar al-Assad.

Russia had been conducting air military operations in Syria in support of the Syrian government since 30 September 2015. Furthermore, Russian private military contractors ("volunteers"), notably those associated with the Wagner Group, had been engaged in ground operations throughout that time, although their presence was never officially confirmed by the Russian government.

In February 2018, Lt. Gen. Jeffrey L. Harrigian, Commander of U.S. Air Forces Central Command, talked about the circumstances before the attack: "The coalition observed a slow buildup of personnel and equipment the previous week, and we reminded Russian officials of the SDF and coalition presence via the telephone deconfliction line. This was well in advance of the enemy forces' attack. I know you're going to ask, so I'm going to be clear that I will not speculate on the composition of this force or whose control they were under." Harrigian presented the U.S. strike as demonstration of the coalition's readiness "to prevent a resurgence of ISIS".

On 22 February 2018, The Washington Post cited unnamed sources in U.S. intelligence as alleging that the communications intercepted days before and after the incident between Russian businessman Yevgeny Prigozhin, who was believed to finance Wagner, and senior Syrian officials, such as Mansour Fadlallah Azzam, as well as Kremlin officials, suggested that Prigozhin had "secured permission" from an unspecified Russian minister to go ahead with a "fast and strong" move in early February and was awaiting approval from the Syrian government.

A few days before, Prigozhin had been indicted by the grand jury for the District of Columbia on charges related to the investigation into Russian interference in the 2016 U.S. elections. A publication by the Ukraine-based anti-Kremlin InformNapalm alleged the operation had been cleared with the Russian military command by Sergey Kim, the chief of Wagner's operations department and a former Russian Naval Infantry officer.

== Incident and casualties ==
=== U.S. version ===
According to the U.S. military's official statement, around 10 p.m. local time on the night of 7 February 2018, a force of 500 pro-government fighters consisting of local militiamen, Syrian Army regulars, Shia militants from Liwa Fatemiyoun and Liwa Zainebiyoun, and reportedly Russian private military contractors, launched an assault on an SDF headquarters near Khasham. Supported by T-72 and T-55 tanks, the pro-government troops first shelled the SDF base with artillery and mortars in a "coordinated attack". Around 20–30 shells landed within 500 meters (1,600 ft) of the headquarters.

According to the U.S. military, the presence of U.S. special operations personnel in the targeted base elicited a response by coalition aircraft, including AC-130 gunships, F-22 Raptor and F-15E Strike Eagle fighter jets, MQ-9 Reaper unmanned combat aerial vehicles, AH-64 Apache attack helicopters, and B-52 bombers. Nearby American artillery batteries, including an M142 HIMARS, shelled Syrian forces as well. According to sources in Wagner, cited by news media as well as the Department of Defense, U.S. forces were in constant contact with the official Russian liaison officer posted in Deir ez-Zor throughout the engagement, and only opened fire after they had received assurances that no regular Russian troops were in action or at risk.

The clashes lasted four hours and saw more than 100 Syrian pro-government fighters killed, with one SDF fighter injured, according to the coalition. No U.S. troops were reported killed or wounded.

According to two unnamed U.S. defense officials cited by CNN on 8 February, the U.S. military had assessed that Russian contractors had been involved, with one saying some of the contractors had been killed in the airstrikes. A Kurdish militia commander and an ex-Russian officer also claimed Russian contractors were present and suffered casualties during the strikes. During the two weeks following the incident, U.S. Secretary of Defense James Mattis and other U.S. military officials repeatedly stated that American military commanders were in contact with their official Russian counterparts prior to, during, and after the clash, and that the U.S military was told by their Russian counterparts that there were no Russians in the paramilitary formation.

On 13 February 2018, unclassified footage depicting the coalition's targeted airstrikes on a pro-government T-72 tank position and a reported Russian contractor artillery position in the Khasham area was released by the Department of Defense.

=== Syrian government version ===
In an official statement that was released by the "ISIS Hunters" unit of the Syrian Armed Forces, they had received intelligence that ISIL forces were moving towards Khasham and government forces decided to move from the Euphrates so to cut off ISIL's line of attack. At this point, armed groups were spotted east of Khasham, in SDF-held territory, which then attacked the government's troops. The groups were quickly pushed back. The military claimed that, according to intercepted radio traffic, the groups were partly ISIL and partly Kurds, and retreated towards the Conoco factory. At this point, pro-government units were hit by airstrikes. According to Syrian military sources, some 55 pro-government fighters were killed, including around 10 Russian fighters.

=== Der Spiegel and SOHR version ===
==== Der Spiegel version ====
Three weeks after the incident, Germany's Der Spiegel published their own investigative report based on evidence gleaned from multiple first-hand sources (participants and witnesses) in the area. According to this report, pro-Syrian government forces spent a week prior to the event gathering in the Deir ez-Zor Airport, which is located to the west of the Euphrates and south of Deir ez-Zor, the capital city of Deir ez-Zor Governorate.

In the vicinity of this city, the Euphrates river runs roughly from the northwest to the southeast, flowing into neighboring Iraq, and splits the city in two. The Syrian government controlled all areas west of the river, including the great majority of Deir ez-Zor, and a salient on the river's east bank across from the city. The SDF controlled almost all other territory east of the river, excluding the salient and the islands in the river.

The Iranian-backed forces that had gathered consisted of members of the Syrian Army's elite 4th Armoured Division, members of the militias of the local Bekara and Albo Hamad Arab tribes, and members of the Iranian-controlled Fatemiyoun and Zainebiyoun brigades. Contrary to what was widely reported at the time, Der Spiegel later reported that according to witnesses, no Russian mercenaries were part of this formation. At the time, Russia and the United States had an agreement that no more than 400 pro-Syrian government fighters could be in the Syrian-government controlled salient on the river's east bank.

As with the deconfliction line, the Syrian government itself never officially agreed to this limit but due to its dependence on Russia, the Syrian Army had nevertheless been, by and large de facto adhering to both; the Iranian government also never joined either of these two bilateral U.S.–Russian agreements. Compared to its influence over the Syrian government, the Russian government had significantly less influence over Iran's government, military, and proxies in Syria, which constituted a large portion of pro-Syrian government ground forces in both Deir ez-Zor and throughout Syria.

The Syrian government's dependence on these ground forces for territorial control, a consequence of severe manpower shortages in the Syrian military, gave Iran significant influence over it, to the extent that Russia and Iran had to increasingly compete for control and influence over the Syria government. Der Spiegel's report did not indicate whether this formation was under Iranian or Syrian command or what attempt, if any, Russia made to force the Syrian and Iranian governments to comply with these U.S.–Russian agreements.

At around 5 a.m. on 7 February 2018, around 250 of these fighters attempted to cross the Euphrates over a military pontoon bridge located to the southeast of both the Deir ez-Zor Airport and the SDF base near Khasham. Warning shots fired by U.S. military forces in the area stopped this morning advance, and the fighters withdrew back to the west of the Euphrates; these warning shots did not result in any injuries. According to Der Spiegel, witnesses said that no Russian mercenaries were part of this group.

Later that same day, under the cover of darkness, about twice as many pro-Syrian government fighters successfully crossed a different bridge located northeast of Deir ez-Zor Airport. They arrived at the village of Marrot, which is northwest of both Khasham and the nearby SDF base. At around 10 p.m. that night, these fighters began to advance southeast toward Khasham. Concurrently, another group of Syrian tribal militia and Shia fighters began to advance north toward Khasham from Tabiyet Jazira, a Syrian government-controlled town east of the Euphrates that is significantly closer to Khasham (and the nearby the SDF base) than Marrot.

U.S. military forces once again opened fire, but this time with the intention of inflicting casualties. According to Der Spiegel's report, no Russians were in either formation, though there was a small contingent of Russian private military contractors (PMCs) stationed in Tabiyeh who were not participating in the fighting. Notwithstanding that, between 10 and 20 of the Russians were killed in the U.S. strikes, while most of the formations' deaths were reportedly among the servicemen of the 4th Armoured Division of the Syrian Army. Further strikes were carried out on the mornings of 8 and 9 February on tribal militia members that had come to retrieve dead bodies.

==== SOHR version ====
Similarly, the UK-based Syrian Observatory for Human Rights reported that 68 pro-government fighters were killed during the day in the area, including 45 who died in the coalition airstrikes, with most being Syrians. The remaining 23 pro-government personnel, including 15 Russians PMCs, were not killed in the airstrikes, but instead caught in a booby-trapped explosion at an arms depot at Tabiyet Jazira. The PMCs were accompanying government forces as they advanced towards the SDF-held oil and gas fields.

=== Unofficial Russian sources version ===
Shortly after the strikes, various Russian unofficial sources began to publicize information that a number of Russian "volunteers" (PMCs) had been killed in the strikes, with some posts on Russian social media making claims of over 200 Russian PMCs being killed, although the veracity of this information was questioned and could not be confirmed. Yevgeny Shabayev, a known critic of the company that hired the contractors, also claimed 218 PMCs were killed and that the families were still waiting for their remains. Additionally, a Russian military doctor, a leader of a PMC-linked paramilitary Cossack organization, and a source with ties to Wagner claimed 80–100 PMCs were killed and 200 wounded.

Contrary to the claims of hundreds of deaths among the PMCs, a Russian investigative group, the Conflict Intelligence Team (CIT), confirmed 10 contractor deaths and estimated a total of between 20 and 30 had died. A Russian journalist also believed between 20 and 25 PMCs died in the strikes. On 17 February, a Wagner leader, Andrei Troshev, was quoted as saying 14 "volunteers" died in the battle. Three other Wagner commanders also stated the claim of 200 dead was an exaggeration and that 15 PMCs were killed at the most.

Russian newspaper Kommersant, citing Russian military and contractor sources, reported pro-government forces were attempting to capture the Conoco (locally called Al Tabiyeh) gas field from the SDF.

== Official reaction ==
- Russia – Russian member of parliament Frants Klintsevich called U.S. strikes illegal and an act of aggression. Russia has accused the U.S. of being motivated by the presence of oil in the area. Vasily Nebenzya, Russia's ambassador to the United Nations, called the strikes "regrettable" and promised to raise it to the Security Council. On 8 February 2018, the Russian foreign ministry spokesperson, without referring to the U.S. strike, spoke of "the U.S. military presence in Syria present[ing] a serious challenge to the peace process and thwart[ing] the protection of the country's territorial integrity."
- Syria – The Syrian foreign ministry wrote to the United Nations calling for the international community to condemn U.S. actions and labeled them a war crime, a "brutal massacre", and a crime against humanity. The Syrian government also accused American forces of aiding terrorism and violating Syria's sovereignty.
- Iran – Ali Khamenei strongly condemned the confrontation and stated "Today, the U.S. government is the cruelest and most merciless system in the world, which is even worse than the savage ISIS members."

== Political ramifications in Russia and abroad ==
In the wake of the incident, in the absence of any official comments in response to allegations about Russian fatalities, details about Russian citizens' involvement and casualties in the U.S. strike began to be made public through social and mass media, provoking resentment and outrage from sections of the Russian public. The issue gained additional sensitivity in Russia in view of the upcoming presidential election in March 2018. Prominent among those figures who early on made public information about presumably high numbers of Russian casualties in the U.S. strike was Igor Strelkov, who in late February 2018 was registered as an authorized representative of Sergey Baburin, leader of the nationalist Russian All-People's Union and candidate for the 2018 Russian presidential election.

Bloomberg, as well as other commentators, opined that both the Russian government and Trump administration, in their official statements, appeared to try obfuscating any Russian government role in the incident. Irek Murtazin of Novaya Gazeta and analyst Yury Barmin speculated that the Russian Ministry of Defence may have wittingly let the Wagner unit find itself in harm's way.

On 12 February 2018, Grigory Yavlinsky called on President Vladimir Putin to present an account of whether any Russian military forces had been involved in the battle. Meanwhile, Russia's government-run news agency TASS acknowledged, with reference to a Cossack organisation, the death in a battle near Deir ez-Zor of a Russian "volunteer", sotnik Vladimir Loginov, a resident of the Kaliningrad Region.

The news media also named four more Russians killed during the strike, including Kirill Ananiev, a veteran member of the banned National Bolshevik Party. News outlets also noted that Vladimir Putin abruptly cancelled most of his previously announced engagements scheduled for 12 and 13 February, his press service citing ill health, and instead had a secret conference with his top military chiefs; he also had a telephone conversation with U.S. president Donald Trump on 12 February, with no details revealed.

Russian politician Viktor Alksnis, authorised representative of Communist Party presidential election candidate Pavel Grudinin, voiced an opinion on Radio Liberty that the U.S. strike was designed as a demonstration of the U.S.'s military superiority and dominance in the region, and that it might have serious geopolitical consequences for Russia.

On 14 February, presidential spokesperson Dmitry Peskov admitted the possibility that some Russian citizens who were not part of Russia's armed forces were in Syria, but dismissed reports of mass casualties as false. The following day, the Russian foreign ministry's spokesperson Maria Zakharova conceded that five Russian citizens might have been killed in the U.S. attack; she emphasized that they were not members of the Russian Armed Forces.

State Duma Defense Committee Chairman Vladimir Shamanov, citing reported casualties of Russian PMCs, said the Russian parliament was working on a bill that would regulate activities of private military contractors, which he said was necessary.

On 16 February, Viktor Alksnis said that the preliminary figure of Russian fatalities in the strike, based on information from the relatives and friends, stood at 334, mainly the personnel of the 5th storm squadron; he also said that, according to his information, personnel of Russia's Special Operations Forces were also involved in "the raid" on 7 February. This was in contrast to CIT's earlier confirmation by name of no more than eight dead. On the same day, Russian Foreign Minister Sergey Lavrov in a Euronews channel interview said, "[The United States] seem to be seeking to isolate a vast part of the Syrian territory from the rest of the country in violation of Syria's sovereignty and territorial integrity." According to an insider source quoted on 19 February by Vedomosti, there were 50 citizens of Russia and Ukraine dead as a result of the U.S. strike.

On 20 February 2018, the Russian foreign ministry released a statement which, while admitting that there had been citizens of Russia and "countries of the CIS" killed and wounded in the course of the "recent clash" in Syria, claimed that no Russian service members or their materiel had been involved in any way. Following the statement, the foreign ministries of Belarus and Kazakhstan were reported to be checking if there were casualties among their countries' citizens, but stated they had no information to confirm that Belarusians or Kazakhstanis had been killed or wounded.

In late February 2018, CNN quoted multiple Russian sources claiming that those seeking to publicise information about the casualties in the 7 February strike were being harassed and silenced, presumably by people loyal to Yevgeny Prigozhin.

Several Russian online news outlets, citing Syria's media and ex-KGB officer Igor Panarin, published unconfirmed reports that the Su-57 fighters, deployed to Syria since February 2017, had taken part in strikes against rebel targets in Eastern Ghouta, killing about ten U.S. personnel (military instructors) as well as other Western countries' instructors stationed in the rebel stronghold, despite the lack of known U.S. military presence in the region; the strikes were presented as retaliation for the U.S. attack at Khasham. A short-term deployment of two Su-57s to Syria was officially confirmed by the Russian defence minister Sergey Shoygu on 1 March 2018. Earlier, Komsomolskaya Pravda military correspondent Viktor Baranets was cited as saying that according to his information, the Su-57s had done "excellent" work carrying out their mission in Eastern Ghouta.

On 12 April 2018, outgoing U.S. Central Intelligence Agency director Mike Pompeo, during his Senate hearing for the position of the United States Secretary of State, commented, "This administration announced a nuclear posture review that has put Russia on notice that we are going to recapitalize our deterrent force. In Syria, now, a handful of weeks ago the Russians met their match. A couple hundred Russians were killed."

The death of the Russian investigative journalist Maksim Borodin, who wrote about the deaths of mercenaries in Syria in mid-April 2018, was linked by the media to his publications about Wagner's casualties in the clash at Khasham.

== Further incidents in the area ==
On 10 February 2018, a U.S. MQ-9 Reaper drone destroyed a T-72 tank of pro-government forces in an airstrike near the Al Tabiyeh gas field. The tank itself was not firing on the SDF and the coalition, but other elements in the formation were.

On 2 March 2018, at least two pro-government fighters were reportedly killed by coalition air raids near Khasham.

On 27 March 2018, U.S. officials, including U.S. Secretary of Defense James Mattis, said a contingent of pro-Syrian government forces and Russian "mercenaries" had again similarly amassed near coalition forces in Deir ez-Zor the week prior, but the potential confrontation was defused after the U.S. military contacted Russian officers. Mattis believed the forces were under Russian control, as the pro-government troops pulled back after U.S. forces spoke with their Russian counterparts.

On 29 April 2018, pro-government forces launched an assault against four SDF villages on the Euphrates, initially capturing them. However, the SDF later retook the villages, with local sources claiming coalition aircraft bombed pro-government positions in response.

On 11 May 2018, the coalition stated that SDF units responded to artillery fire from an unknown source on the outskirts of Deir ez-Zor; the SDF returned fire, leading to the destruction of one enemy artillery piece. No casualties were reported on either side of the engagement. The coalition discussed the development with Russian counterparts via the established deconfliction line.

== See also ==
- September 2016 Deir ez-Zor air raid
- Tokhar airstrike
- 2017 al-Jinah airstrike
- 2017 Shayrat missile strike
- Death of Maksim Borodin
- American-led intervention in the Syrian civil war
- Iranian involvement in the Syrian civil war
- Russian military intervention in the Syrian civil war
- Timber Sycamore (CIA)
- Soviet air intervention in the Korean War
