= Dablan =

Dablan دَبْلَان
- Town
- Location in Syria
- Coordinates: 34°51′18″N 40°34′7″E
- Country: Syria
- Governorate: Deir ez-Zor
- District: Mayadin
- Subdistrict: al-Asharah

Population (2004)
  - Total: 6,149
- Time zone: UTC+3 (AST)
- City Qrya Pcode: C5208

Dablan (Arabic: دَبْلَان, romanized: Dablān) is a Syrian town located in Mayadin District, Deir ez-Zor. According to the Syria Central Bureau of Statistics (CBS), Dablan had a population of 6,149 in the 2004 census.
