= Al-Quriyah =

Al-Quriyah القورية
- City
- Location within Syria
- Coordinates: 35°0′9″N 40°30′42″E
- Country: Syria
- Governorate: Deir ez-Zor
- District: Mayadin
- Subdistrict: Al-Quriyah

Population (2020 census)
  - Total: 70,680
- Time zone: UTC+2 (EET)
  - Summer (DST): UTC+3 (EEST)

Al-Quriyah (Arabic: القورية, romanized: al-Qūriyah, also spelled Qurieh) is a city in eastern Syria, administratively part of the Deir ez-Zor Governorate, located along the eastern bank of the Euphrates River, south of Deir ez-Zor. Nearby localities include Diban, Mahkan and al-Tayanah to the north, Mayadin to the northwest and al-Asharah, Darnaj and Suwaydan Jazirah to the south. According to the Syria Central Bureau of Statistics, al-Quriyah had a population of 70680 in the 2004 census, making it the largest locality in the al-Asharah subdistrict ("nahiyah.")

On 30 March 2012 the Syrian Army opened fire on a demonstration in al-Quriyah, resulting in clashes that left five people dead according to the Syrian Observatory for Human Rights (SOHR). According to SOHR, fighting in al-Quriyah resulted in the deaths of five Syrian Army soldiers, four rebels and one civilian. On 24 May 2012 clashes between rebels and government forces ended with the death of one soldier and a young civilian man according to opposition activists. A nearby oil pipeline was blown up by armed opposition groups on 6 June 2012. On 22 October 2017, Syrian Army took Al-Quriyah.

On December 6, 2024, Islamic State (IS) cells occupied Al-Quriyah after pro-Assad forces abandoned the area during the 2024 Syrian opposition offensives. On December 7, 2024, it's likely Rebels forces captured the settlement from the IS.
