= Makhan =

Makhan is born a masculine given name and surname. Notable people with the surname include:

== Given name ==
- Makhan Lal Fotedar (1932–2017), Indian politician
- Mark Khangure (Makhan Singh Khangure), Indian-born radiologist
- Makhan Shah Labana 15th-century devout Sikh and trader
- Makhan Singh (disambiguation), multiple people
- Makhan Lal Singla (born 1949), Indian politician

== Surname ==
- Abdul Kuddas Makhan (1947–1994), Bangladeshi politician
- K. S. Makhan (born 1975), Indian wrestler, actor, singer and politician
- Kyranbek Makhan (born 1992), Chinese basketball player

== See also ==
- Makhan Bada
- Mahkan, Syria
