= Malik ibn Tawk =

Governor of Syria (Bilad al-Sham)

Malik ibn Tawk ibn Malik ibn 'Attab at-Taghlibi مالك بن طوق بن مالك بن عتاب التغليبي

Governor of Damascus and Jordan
- In office 847 – 850
- Monarch: Al-Mutawakkil
- Preceded by: Rija ibn Ayyub al-Hadari (841–847)
- Succeeded by: al-Mu'ayyad

Governor of Mosul
- In office 829 – 831
- Monarch: al-Mamun
- Preceded by: Muhammed ibn al-Sayyid ibn Anas (827–828)
- Succeeded by: Mansur ibn Bassam (c.834–838)

Personal details
- Died: 873
- Parent: Tawk ibn Malik ibn Attab at-Taghlibi

Malik ibn Tawk ibn Malik ibn 'Attab at-Taghlibi (Arabic: مالك بن طوق التغلبي) (died 873) was an Arab Abbasid official during the reigns of caliphs al-Wathiq (r. 842–847) and al-Mutawakkil (r. 847–861). He is best known as the founder of the fortress town of al-Rahba on the western banks of the Euphrates, part of the present-day Syrian town of Mayadin.

== Biography ==
Malik ibn Tawk belonged to the Arab tribe of Banu Taghlib and traced his lineage to the 6th-century Taghlibi poet warrior Amr ibn Kulthum. His father, Tawk ibn Malik, served as governor of Diyar Rabi'a, the district of the eastern Jazira (Upper Mesopotamia) under the Abbasid caliph al-Ma'mun (r. 813–833). He also served as a general under al-Ma'mun's predecessor, Caliph Harun al-Rashid (r. 786–809), Some Muslim sources have often incorrectly made the son Malik ibn Tawk to have been the one in the service of Harun and al-Ma'mun instead of his father. Malik ibn Tawk served under the caliphs al-Wathiq (r. 842–847) and al-Mutawakkil (r. 847–861) as the governor of Jund al-Urdunn (military district of Jordan) and Jund Dimashq (military district of Damascus).

Sometime in the latter half of the 9th century, Malik convinced his kinsman, Sahl ibn Bishr, a great-grandson of the 7th-century Taghlibi poet al-Akhtal, to convert to islam from Christianity along with the other direct descendants of al-Akhtal. Malik founded the Euphrates Valley fortress of al-Rahba and became its lord. The fortress town was since alternatively known as "Rahbat Malik ibn Tawk". He died in 873. His son Ahmad succeeded him as the lord of al-Rahba, but was forced out of the town in 883 by the lord of al-Anbar, Muhammad ibn Abi'l-Saj.

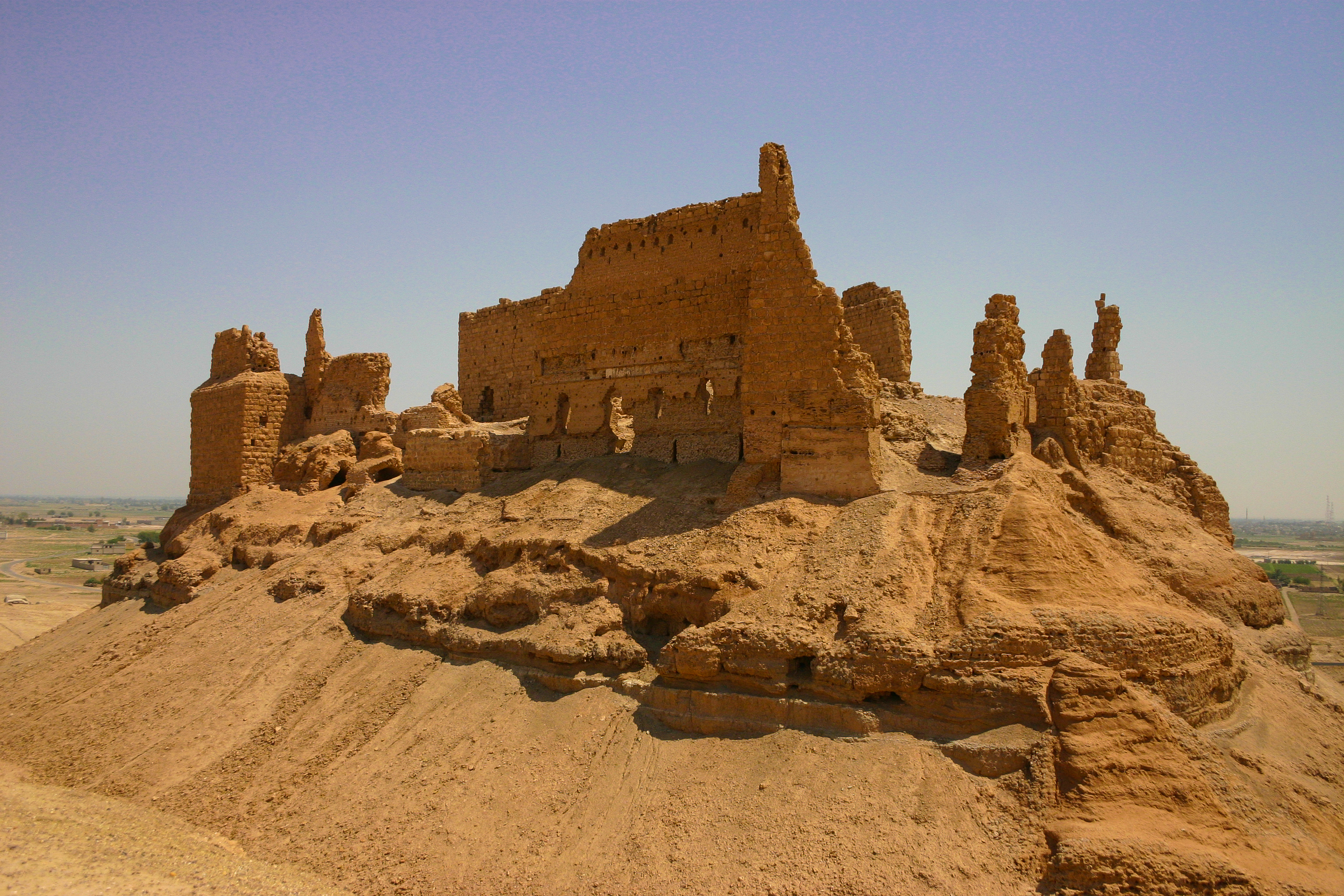
The ruins of the al-Rahba fortress, the fortress is located in Syria, it was founded by Abbasid Governor Malik ibn Tawk

The al-Rahabi clan of the Euphrates basin, claims descent from Malik ibn Tawk.
