= Al-Salihiyah, Deir ez-Zor Governorate =

Al-Salihiyah الصالحية
- Village
- Location within Syria
- Coordinates: 34.767616°N 40.645784°E
- Country: Syria
- Governorate: Deir ez-Zor
- District: Abu Kamal
- Subdistrict: al-Jalaa

Population (2004 census)
  - Total: 4,471
- Time zone: UTC+2 (EET)
  - Summer (DST): UTC+3 (EEST)

Al-Salihiyah (Arabic: الصالحية; also spelled Salhiyé) is a town in eastern Syria, administratively part of the Deir ez-Zor Governorate, located on the western bank of the Euphrates River, south of Deir ez-Zor. Nearby localities include al-Asharah, Mayadin and al-Muhasan to the north and Hajin and al-Jalaa to the south. According to the Syria Central Bureau of Statistics, al-Salihiyah had a population of 4,471 in the 2004 census. The village is located just next to the site of ancient Dura-Europos.

== Syrian civil war ==
In the Syrian civil war the town was located in the centre of the self-proclaimed caliphate of ISIL from early 2014 until December 2017. On 3 December 2017, Tiger Forces belonging to the Syrian government surrounded the town, who later captured on 7 December. It was one of the last towns west of the Euphrates to be controlled by ISIL.

In a counteroffensive on 13 December ISIL forces briefly recaptured the town, only to lose it again, along with all other territories gained in their counteroffensive when, three days later, a large Syrian army attack was launched on the western bank of Euphrates river.

On 1 May 2023, at least 13 people, including 8 Pro-Assad militiamen and 2 civilians, were killed in an ISIS ambush in the desert near the town.
