= Ibn Nazif =

13th-century Muslim chronicler and historian

Abu'l Fada'il Muhammad ibn Ali ibn Abd al-Aziz ibn Ali ibn Muzhir ibn Barakat, commonly known as Ibn Nazif al-Hamawi (ALA-LC: Ibn Naẓīf al-Ḥamawī), was a 13th-century Muslim chronicler and historian of the Ayyubid era.

== Biography ==
There is scant biographical information about Ibn Nazif, and most information about him comes from his chronicle. He was likely born in Hama in the latter half of the 12th century to that city's prominent Banu Nazif clan, hence his name. He became a well-placed official in the court of the Ayyubid emir of Qal'at Ja'bar, al-Malik al-Hafiz ibn al-Adil (died 1240), who was subordinate to the Ayyubid emirs of Hama. Ibn Nazif was terminated from his post in 1230 as a result of a dispute with al-Hafiz over the fate of a slave. While drunk at a party, Ibn Nazif was arrested and had his properties confiscated on al-Hafiz's orders. He remained imprisoned for undetermined period, but was released by the Ayyubid emir of Jazira, al-Ashraf Musa, with whom Ibn Nazif maintained good relations.

Ibn Nazif relocated to the Euphrates fortress town of al-Rahba where he received the patronage of its commander, al-Mansur Ibrahim. When the latter succeeded his father, al-Mujahid Shirkuh II, as emir of Homs, Ibn Nazif left with him. In Homs, Ibn Nazif was given a pension, which allowed him to pen his historical chronicle, Tarikh Mansuri, which he dedicated to al-Mansur. The date of his death is unknown, though he likely died in Homs.

== Works ==
Few insights about his works revealed how he used curses in his records. This is demonstrated in his account of the fall of Jerusalem, which scholars noted was also strikingly concise: "The Franks—may God curse them—took Jerusalem." Ibn Nazif also recorded events in the Ayyubid realm such as the rebuilding activities launched in the year 622/1225 at al-Raqqa. Two letters from Frederick II, Holy Roman Emperor, were copied by Ibn Nazif into his chronicle. He also recorded information about the expulsion of the Muslims of Sicily taken directly from refugees who fled to Syria.
