= Deconfliction line =

Official line of communications

A deconfliction line is an official line of communications established between militaries who are or could be hostile, to avoid dangerous misunderstandings and miscalculations based on ignorance. The ultimate aim is to avoid accidents and conflict escalation.

In the 2010s and 2020s, the US and Russia set up deconfliction lines during the Syrian civil war and Russo-Ukrainian War. They were regularly tested by military staff, and used by air traffic controllers and senior military officers. They were used to avoid midair collisions between aircraft in the same or adjacent airspace, and sometimes to give warning of airstrikes. In April 2017, Russia severed the Syrian line in retaliation for a called strike.

== See also ==
- 2015 Russian Sukhoi Su-24 shootdown, a motive for establishing the Syrian deconfliction line
- September 2016 Deir ez-Zor air raid
- Line of communications
- Moscow–Washington hotline
- Russia–Syria relations
- Wagner Group activities in Syria
