= Al-Rahba =

Ruined castle in Syria

- الرحبة
- Mayadin, Dayr az-Zawr Governorate, Syria
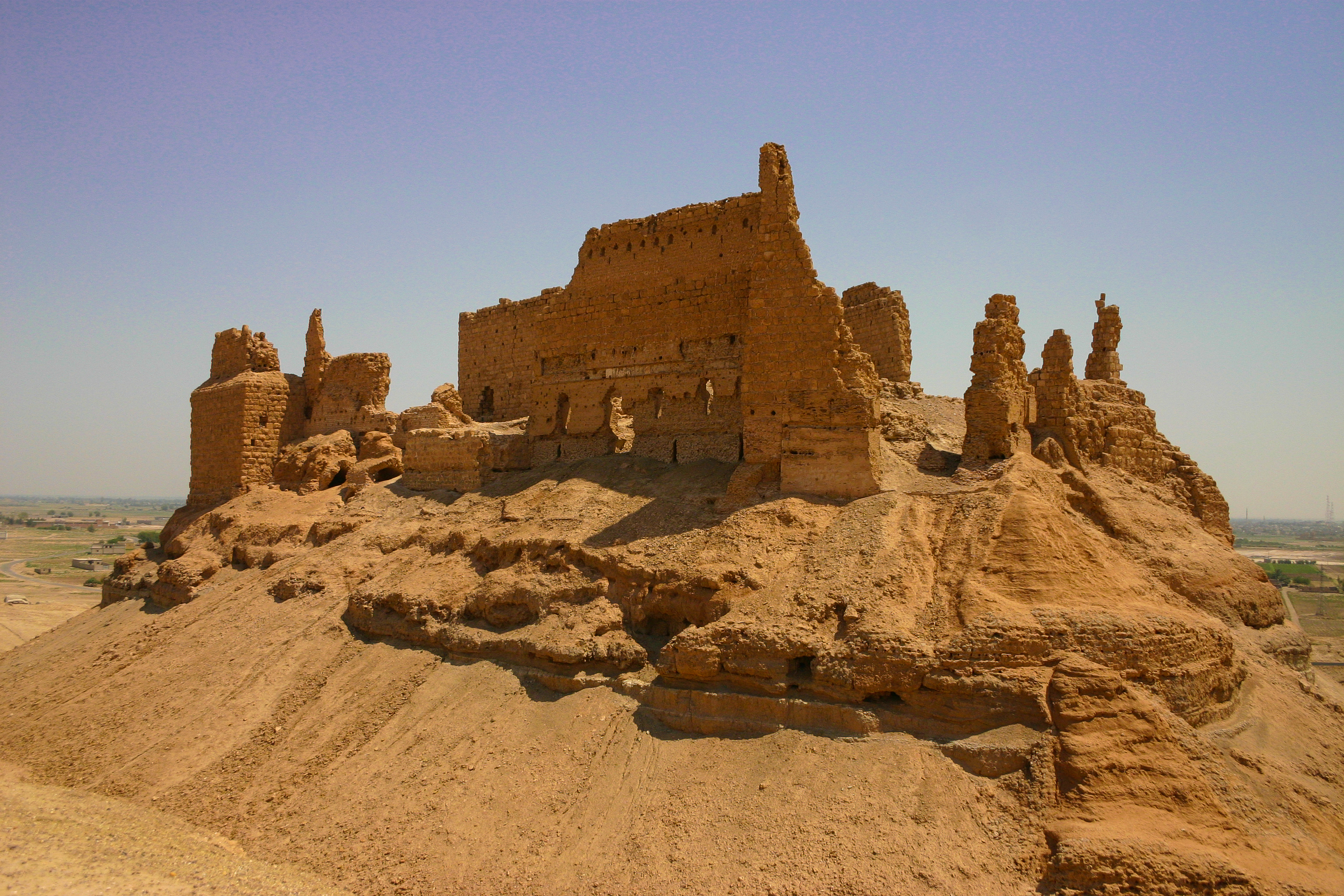
- The ruins of the al-Rahba fortress, 2005

Site information
- Type: Concentric castle
- Condition: Ruined

Location
- Location within Syria Location within West and Central Asia
- Coordinates: 35.005°N 40.4235°E
- Length: 270 by 95 meters (886 ft × 312 ft)

Site history
- Built: Second half of 9th century (first construction); Mid-12th century (second reconstruction); 1207 (third construction)
- Built by: Malik ibn Tawk (first construction); Shirkuh (second construction); Shirkuh II (third construction)
- Materials: Limestone, mudbrick, gypsum, puddingstone

Al-Rahba (/ALA-LC: al-Raḥba, sometimes spelled Raḥabah), also known as Qal'at al-Rahba (قلعة الرحبة), which translates as the "Citadel of al-Rahba", is a medieval Arab fortress on the west bank of the Euphrates River, adjacent to the city of Mayadin in Syria. Situated atop a mound with an elevation of 244 meters (801 ft), al-Rahba oversees the Syrian Desert steppe. It has been described as "a fortress within a fortress"; it consists of an inner keep measuring 60 by 30 meters (197 ft × 98 ft), protected by an enclosure measuring 270 by 95 meters (886 ft × 312 ft). Al-Rahba is largely in ruins today as a result of wind erosion.

The original site, which was known as "Rahbat Malik ibn Tawk" after its Abbasid namesake and founder, was located along the Euphrates. It was viewed by Muslim armies, caravans and travelers as the key to Syria from Iraq and sometimes vice versa. Bedouin tribes often took control of it and used it as a launching point for invasions of northern Syria. Because of its strategic location, al-Rahba was frequently fought over by Muslim powers, including local lords, the Hamdanids, the Uqaylids, the Mirdasids and the Seljuks, among others. Rahbat Malik ibn Tawk was destroyed in an earthquake in 1157.

A few years later, the current fortress was built close to the desert edge by the Zengid–Ayyubid lord Shirkuh. The latter's descendants held al-Rahba as a hereditary fief granted by Saladin until 1264. One of them, Shirkuh II, oversaw a third major reconstruction in 1207. Through the early Mamluk era (late 13th–14th centuries), the fortress was continuously restored and strengthened as a result of frequent sieges by the Ilkhanid Mongols of Iraq. Al-Rahba was the most important Mamluk fortress along the Euphrates, an administrative center and the terminal stop on the sultanate's postal route. It fell into disuse during Ottoman rule (1517–1918) and from then until the early 20th century, the fortress primarily served as a shelter for local shepherds and their flocks. Excavations were carried out at the site between 1976 and 1981.

== Location and etymology ==
Throughout Islamic history, al-Rahba was considered, in the words of the 14th-century traveler Ibn Batuta, "the end of Iraq and the beginning of al-Sham [Syria]". The fortress is located about 4 kilometers (2.5 mi) southwest of the Euphrates River, 1 kilometer (0.62 mi) southwest of the modern Syrian city of Mayadin, and 42 kilometers (26 mi) southeast of Dayr az-Zawr, capital of the Dayr az-Zawr Governorate, of which al-Rahba is part. According to the 13th-century geographer Yaqut al-Hamawi, the site's name, al-raḥba, translates from Arabic as the "flat part of a wadi, where the water collects"; al-Rahba's original location was on the western bank of the Euphrates. The current fortress is situated on an artificial mound detached from the plateau of the Syrian Desert to its west. Its elevation is 244 meters (801 ft) above sea level.

== History ==
=== Rahbat Malik ibn Tawk ===
==== Founding ====
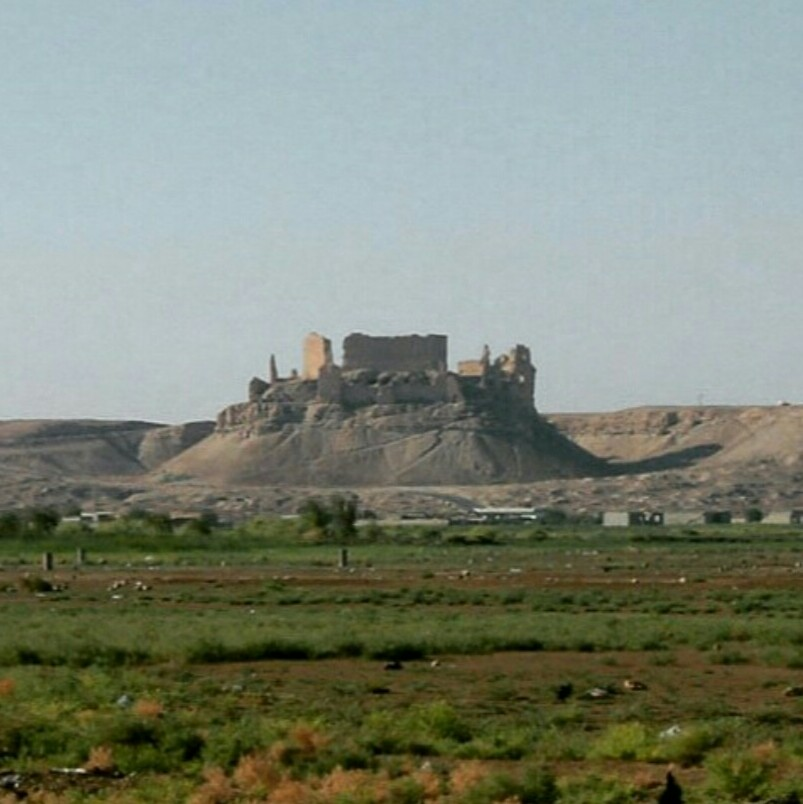
The fortress of al-Rahba as seen from the city of Mayadin

According to historian Thierry Bianquis, "Hardly anything definite is known about the history of the town [al-Rahba] before the Muslim era." Medieval Talmudic and Syriac writers (such as Michael the Syrian and Bar Hebraeus) identified it with the Biblical town of Rehobot han-Nahar ("Rehobot by the river [Euphrates]"). Some medieval Muslim historians, among them al-Tabari, have written that it was a place called "Furda" or "Furdat Nu'm", named after a monastery that supposedly existed in its vicinity called "Dayr Nu'm". However, the 9th-century Persian historian al-Baladhuri asserts that there was "no trace that ar-Rahba ... was an old city", and that it was first founded by the Abbasid general Malik ibn Tawk during the reign of Caliph al-Ma'mun (813–833 CE). As such, the fortress town was often referred to as "Rahbat Malik ibn Tawk" by Muslim historians. According to Syrian historian Suhayl Zakkar, al-Rahba held significant strategic value as it was "the key to Syria and sometimes to Iraq" and it was the first stop for Syria-bound caravans coming from Iraq. From al-Rahba, travelers, caravans and armies could proceed northwestward along the Euphrates route to Aleppo or traverse the desert route to Damascus. Because of its strategic value, it was frequently fought over by rival Muslim powers. Bedouin tribes in particular used al-Rahba as a main launch point for invasions of northern Syria, and as a safe haven and marketplace. Malik ibn Tawk served as its first lord, and after his death in 873, he was succeeded by his son Ahmad. The latter was expelled following al-Rahba's capture in 883 by the Abbasid lord of al-Anbar, Muhammad ibn Abi'l-Saj. By the 10th century, al-Rahba had become a large town.

In 903, the Qarmatian leader al-Husayn ibn Zikrawayh was imprisoned in al-Rahba before being transferred to Caliph al-Mustakfi's custody in Raqqa. At the time, al-Rahba was the center of the Euphrates province and headquarters of its governor, Ibn Sima. Al-Husayn was executed, prompting his partisans from the Banu Ullays, a branch of the Banu Kalb tribe, to submit to Ibn Sima in al-Rahba in early 904. However, shortly after, they turned against Ibn Sima, whose forces routed them in an ambush in al-Rahba's environs in August. Following further battles, Ibn Sima received another round of surrenders by Qarmatian chieftains and da'is (Ismaili religious leaders). In March 928, the Qarmatians under Abu Tahir al-Jannabi conquered al-Rahba and massacred scores of its inhabitants during their invasion of Iraq. Its residents faced hardships for several more years due to civil strife in the surrounding region. Peace was established in 942 with the arrival of an Abbasid commander named Adl who was dispatched by Bajkam, the strongman of the Baghdad-based caliphate. Adl subsequently became governor of the Euphrates and Khabur valley regions.

==== Hamdanid period ====
Al-Rahba came under Hamdanid rule a few years later, becoming part of the Euphrates district (tariq al-Furat) of the Mosul-based emirate. At the time, the town was described by the Persian geographer al-Istakhri, as being larger than the ancient Circesium on the opposite side of the Euphrates. The lord of al-Rahba, Jaman, rebelled against the Hamdanid emir of Mosul, Nasir al-Dawla (r. 929–968/9). Jaman fled the town and drowned in the Euphrates, but not before al-Rahba was heavily damaged in the rebellion's suppression. Nasir al-Dawla granted his favored son, Abu'l-Muzzafar Hamdan, control of al-Rahba, its district of Diyar Mudar, and the district's revenues.

Nasir al-Dawla's sons contested control of al-Rahba in the aftermath of their father's deposition in 969. It ultimately passed to his son Abu Taghlib when his brother and subordinate commander, Hibat-Allah, captured it from Hamdan in a surprise attack. Abu Taghlib had al-Rahba's walls rebuilt. He restored al-Rahba to Hamdan to preempt the possibility of his Buyid enemy, Izz al-Dawla al-Bakhtiyar, forming an alliance with Hamdan to undermine Abu Taghlib. The Hamdanids lost control of al-Rahba in 978, after which it was captured by the Buyid emir 'Adud al-Dawla (r. 949–983). In 991, al-Rahba's inhabitants requested and received a governor assigned by 'Adud's son, Emir Baha' al-Dawla (r. 988–1012). The town was described by Jerusalemite geographer al-Muqaddasi in the late 10th century as being the center of the Euphrates district, located on the edge of the desert, having a semi-circular layout and being defended by a strong fortress. He also noted that the wider vicinity was characterized by highly irrigated and productive lands, with abundant date palms and quince groves.

==== Uqaylid and Mirdasid period ====
In the early 11th century, control of al-Rahba was contested between the Uqaylids of Mosul and the Fatimids of Egypt. Preceding this conflict, the Fatimid caliph al-Hakim appointed a member of the Al Khafajah tribe, Abu Ali ibn Thimal, as lord of al-Rahba. Abu Ali was killed in 1008/09 during a battle with his Uqaylid rivals led by Isa ibn Khalat. The latter lost al-Rahba to another Uqaylid emir, Badran ibn al-Muqallad. The latter's victory was short-lived as the Fatimid emir of Damascus, Lu'lu, soon captured both al-Rahba and Raqqa, a fortified city to the northwest. He appointed a governor for al-Rahba and returned to Damascus.

A wealthy resident of al-Rahba, Ibn Mahkan, revolted against the Fatimids and took control of the town shortly after Lu'lu departed. Though able to oust the Fatimid governor, Ibn Mahkan was unable to hold the town without outside support since al-Rahba was located amid the crossroads of several regional powers who coveted the town. Thus, he gained the backing of the Mirdasid emir of the Banu Kilab tribe, Salih ibn Mirdas. Conflict arose between Ibn Mahkan and Salih leading the latter to besiege al-Rahba. The two reconciled and then Ibn Mahkan and his men captured the fortified town of Anah in Anbar. However, when Ibn Mahkan sought Salih's support in suppressing a revolt in Anah, the latter used the opportunity to kill Ibn Mahkan.

After eliminating Ibn Mahkan, Salih became the lord of al-Rahba, and made his allegiance with the Fatimids. Al-Rahba was the first major territory Salih held and was the touchstone of the emirate he would establish in Aleppo and much of northern Syria. His son Thimal later succeeded him as emir of Aleppo, and al-Rahba became his principal power base from which many of his viziers originated. He was later compelled by the Fatimids to hand over al-Rahba to their ally Arslan al-Basasiri, a Turkish general who revolted against his Seljuk masters and the Abbasid Caliphate. The ceding of al-Rahba to al-Basasiri was the first step in Thimal's loss of the Mirdasid emirate. Together with the loss of Raqqa, it provoked dissension within the Banu Kilab, with Thimal's brother Atiyya resolving to restore the Mirdasid emirate. Al-Basasiri's revolt ultimately failed and he was killed in 1059, prompting Atiyya to capture al-Rahba in April 1060. Later, in August 1061, Atiyya successfully defended al-Rahba from Numayrid advances.

The Mirdasids lost al-Rahba in 1067 to the Uqaylid emir, Sharaf ad-Dawla, a vassal of the Abbasid-affiliated Seljuks. Beforehand, Atiyya and part of his army had been in Homs, allowing Sharaf ad-Dawla the opportunity to rout al-Rahba's Banu Kilab defenders. Afterward, the name of the Abbasid caliph was read in the town's khutba (Friday prayer sermons) instead of the Fatimids, a formal recognition of al-Rahba's change of allegiance. In 1086, the Seljuk sultan Malik-Shah granted al-Rahba and its Upper Mesopotamian dependencies, Harran, Raqqa, Saruj and Khabur, to Sharaf ad-Dawla's son, Muhammad.

==== Seljuk period ====
At some point the Seljuks or their Arab allies lost al-Rahba, but in 1093 the Seljuk ruler of Damascus, Tutush captured it along with several other Upper Mesopotamian towns. Following his death, possession of al-Rahba reverted to the Uqaylids, but in 1096, Karbuqa of al-Hillah captured and looted the town. He held onto it until 1102 when Qaymaz, a former mamluk (slave soldier) of the Seljuk sultan Alp Arslan, took control of it. Tutush's son Duqaq and the latter's deputy Tughtakin besieged the town, but failed to capture it. Qaymaz died in December 1102 and al-Rahba passed to one of his Turkish mamluks named Hasan, who dismissed many of Qaymaz's officers and arrested several of al-Rahba's notables due to suspicions of a coup against him. Duqaq renewed the siege, but this time was welcomed in by al-Rahba's townspeople, forcing Hasan to retreat into the citadel. Hasan surrendered after receiving guarantees of safe passage from Duqaq as well as an iqta (fief) elsewhere in Syria. According to the 12th-century chronicler Ibn al-Athir, al-Rahba's inhabitants were treated well by Duqaq, who reorganized the administration of the town, established a garrison there, and assigned to it a governor from the Banu Shayban tribe, Muhammad ibn Sabbak.

Jawali, a general of the Seljuk sultan Muhammad I, conquered al-Rahba from Ibn Sabbak in May 1107, after a month-long siege. Ibn al-Athir recorded that al-Rahba's inhabitants suffered greatly during the siege and that some townsmen informed Jawali of a weak point in the fortress's defense in return for promises of safety. When Jawali entered the town and sacked it, Ibn Sabbak surrendered and joined Jawali's service.

In 1127, the Seljuk lord of Mosul, Izz ad-Din Mas'ud ibn al-Bursuqi besieged and conquered al-Rahba as part of an attempted invasion of Syria. However, he fell ill and died there shortly after. His lordship in Mosul was taken by Imad ad-Din Zengi, while al-Rahba was left under the control of al-Bursuqi's mamluk, al-Jawali, who ruled it as a subordinate of Zengi. Zengi's son Qutb ad-Din captured al-Rahba some years later. In 1149, Qutb ad-Din's brother Nur ad-Din received al-Rahba in Seljuk-sponsored negotiations between the Zengid lords.

=== Al-Rahba al-Jadida ===
==== Ayyubid period ====
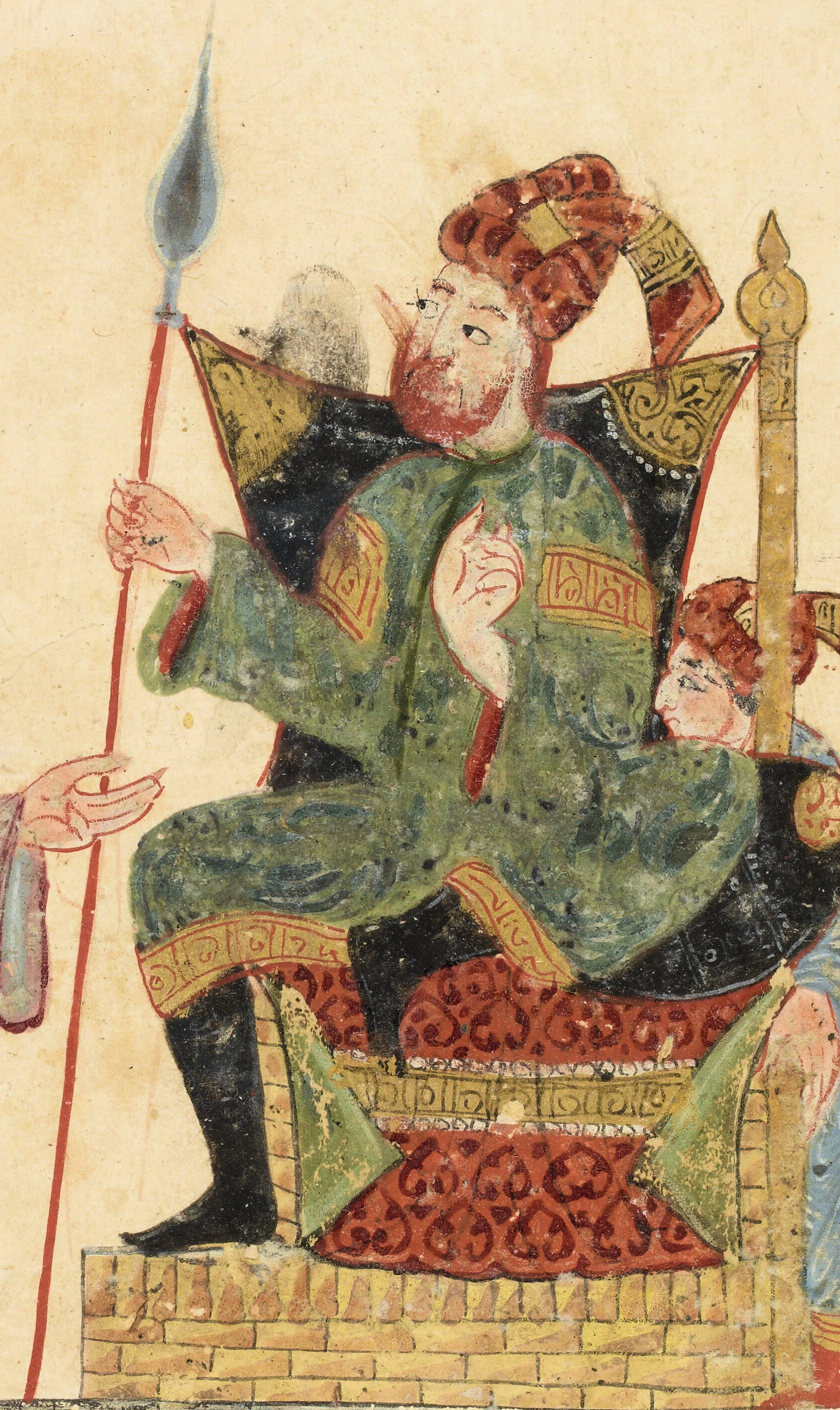
The Governor of al-Rahba. Maqamat of al-Hariri, Baghdad, 1237.

Al-Rahba was destroyed in an earthquake in 1157. Four years later, Nur ad-Din granted the territories of al-Rahba and Homs as a fief to Shirkuh, who had a certain Yusuf ibn Mallah administer it on his behalf. According to the 14th-century Ayyubid historian, Abu'l-Fida, Shirkuh rebuilt al-Rahba. Abu'l-Fida's assertion may have been incorrect or the fortress built by Shirkuh fell into a ruinous state at some point before the century's end. In any case, the new fortress, which became known as "al-Rahba al-Jadida", was relocated about five kilometers west of the Euphrates' western bank, where the original site, "Rahbat Malik ibn Tawk", had been situated. When Shirkuh died, his territories reverted to Nur ad-Din. However, Shirkuh's nephew and the founder of the Ayyubid Sultanate, Saladin, conquered Nur ad-Din's domains by 1182 and granted Homs and al-Rahba to Shirkuh's son, Nasir ad-Din Muhammad, as a hereditary emirate.

According to the Ayyubid-era chronicler and one-time resident of al-Rahba, Ibn Nazif, the fortress of al-Rahba was rebuilt again by Shirkuh's grandson, al-Mujahid Shirkuh II (r. 1186–1240), in 1207. Al-Rahba was the easternmost fortress of Shirkuh II's Homs-based emirate, and was one of the four principal centers of the emirate, the other three being Homs itself, Salamiyah and Palmyra. He personally oversaw the demolition of al-Rahba's ruins and the construction of the new fortress. Al-Rahba remained in the hands of Shirkuh's descendants until a few years after the annexation of Ayyubid Syria by the Mamluk Sultanate in 1260.

==== Mamluk period ====
In 1264, the Mamluk sultan Baybars (r. 1260–1277) replaced the Ayyubid governor of al-Rahba with one of his mamluk officers from Egypt. Al-Rahba's garrison and its commander held a high place in the Mamluk military hierarchy. The fortress, along with and al-Bira to the north, emerged as the principal Mamluk bulwark against Mongol invasions of Syria's eastern frontier. It was the Mamluks' most important fortress along the Euphrates, supplanting Raqqa, which had been the traditional Muslim center in the Euphrates valley since the 10th century. A large population of refugees from areas ruled by the Mongols settled in al-Rahba as did many people from the adjacent, unfortified town of Mashhad al-Rahba (former site of Rahbat Malik ibn Tawk, modern-day Mayadin). It was also the terminal stop of the Mamluk barid (postal route) and an administrative center.

Throughout the Ayyubid and Mamluk periods, al-Rahba was situated near the tribal territory of the Al Fadl. About four hundred Al Fadl tribesmen joined the small army of Caliph al-Mustansir, the Egypt-based Abbasid caliph dispatched by Baybars to recapture Baghdad from the Mongols, when he reached al-Rahba. The latter was al-Mustansir's first stop after he rode out from Damascus, but his campaign ultimately failed and he was killed in a Mongol ambush in al-Anbar. The Mongols of Ilkhanid Iraq inflicted significant damage on al-Rahba during their wars with the Mamluks. The fortress was restored by Baybars at some point toward the end of his reign. In 1279, the Mamluk viceroy of Syria, Sunqur al-Ashqar, rebelled against Sultan Qalawun (r. 1279–1290) and took refuge with the Al Fadl chieftain, Isa ibn Muhanna, at al-Rahba, where he requested the intervention of the Mongol ruler Abaqa Khan. When the Mongols could not help him, Sunqur fled the incoming Mamluk army, while Isa barricaded himself in the fortress. The Mongols' failure to capture al-Rahba after a month-long siege commanded by the Ilkhanid ruler Öljaitü in 1312/13 marked the Ilkhanate's final attempt to invade Mamluk Syria. Isa's son Muhanna rebelled against Sultan an-Nasir Muhammad (r. 1310–1341) in 1320, and was pursued by the Mamluk army as far al-Rahba. During the ensuing confrontation, the fortress may have been destroyed.

==== Ottoman era ====
Under the Ottomans, who conquered Syria and Iraq in the early 16th century, al-Rahba's military use apparently diminished. During the Middle Ages, the road between Palmyra and al-Rahba was the most important Syrian desert route, but its importance declined during Ottoman rule. From then on, al-Rahba was mostly used as a shelter for shepherds from nearby villages and their flocks. In 1588, it was visited by the Venetian traveler Gasparo Balbi, who noted a dilapidated fortress and inhabitants known as "Rahabi" living below it. The French traveler, Jean-Baptiste Tavernier, mentioned Mashhad Rahba, 9.7 kilometres (6.0 mi) southwest of the fortress, during his travels there in circa 1632. The town did serve as the centre of the Ottoman sancak (province) of Deyr-Rahbe, which also encompassed Deir ez-Zor. For much of the sixteenth to eighteenth century, it was held by emirs of the Al Abu Risha, descendants of the Al Fadl emirs, who were appointed both as Ottoman governors and as çöl beyis (desert emirs). In 1797, French traveler Guillaume-Antoine Olivier passed by al-Rahba, mentioning that it was a fortress and a ruined site.

== Excavations ==
The fortress has deteriorated considerably as a result of erosion. Excavations were carried out at al-Rahba, including the presumed site of Rahbat Malik ibn Tawk along the Euphrates bank, between 1976 and 1981 under the auspices of Syria's General Directorate of Antiquities and Museums, the Institut Français d'Etudes Arabes de Damas and the University of Lyon II. In later years, surveys of the site and the surrounding desert and Euphrates and Khabur valleys were carried out by multi-disciplinary teams of Syrian, American and European archaeologists. One of the French surveyors, J. L. Paillet, sketched the plans and elevations of the fortress, which are detailed in his 1983 dissertation, Le château de Rahba, étude d'architecture militaire islamique médiévale.

Excavations at the foot of the fortress between 1976 and 1978 revealed a medieval settlement within a quadrangular enclosure, some of whose walls measured up to 30 meters (98 ft) long and 4 meters (13 ft) high. The walls generally have a thickness of 1 meter (3.3 ft). Among the unearthed structures were the probable remains of a khan (caravanserai), a jama masjid (congregational mosque) with a small oratory, and a cavalry barracks. There was also a system of canals that brought in fresh water and emptied sewage. Among the artifacts found at the fortress and the former settlement beneath it were pottery sherds and coins (mostly Mamluk and a few Ayyubid) and numerous feather fletches belonging to arrows left over by Mongol besiegers. During the ongoing Syrian Civil War, looting and illegal digging for antiquities have occurred at al-Rahba. Affected areas include the fortress's storage rooms and courtyards, as well as the medieval settlement at its foot.

== Architecture ==
=== Specifications and components ===
The citadel of al-Rahba is described by historian Janusz Bylinski as "a fortress within a fortress". Its core consists of a four-story, pentagon-shaped keep, roughly measuring 60 by 30 meters (197 ft × 98 ft). The keep is enclosed by a pentagon-shaped wall, roughly measuring 270 by 95 meters (886 ft × 312 ft). The outer wall's shape was described by Paillet as a triangle with its two parallel angles having been chamfered and substituted with short curtain walls. Around the artificial mound upon which the fortress sits is a moat with a depth of 22 meters (72 ft) and a width of 80 meters (260 ft). Al-Rahba's moat is considerably deeper than the Ayyubid-era desert fortresses of Palmyra and Shumaimis. A large cistern makes up the lowest floor of the keep.

Several bastions were built along the external walls of the fortress. The western and southeastern sides contained al-Rahba's four largest bastions, with the largest measuring 17.2 by 15.2 meters (56 ft × 50 ft) and the smallest being 12.4 by 12.4 meters (41 ft × 41 ft). These bastions supported heavy defensive artillery. Their height surpassed the towers of Palmyra and Shumaimis probably because the latter forts' locations on isolated hills did not necessitate "state of the art defensive artillery", according to Bylinski. By contrast, at al-Rahba, enemy siege engines could be placed at the close by plateaus, which were almost at level with the fortress. Al-Rahba's smallest bastion is on its northern, less vulnerable wall and measures 5.2 by 4.4 meters (17 ft × 14 ft).

Both the external walls and those around the keep were fitted with merlons and parapets, with the parapets of the keep positioned 6.5 meters higher than their counterparts along the external wall. This was done to establish a secondary defensive line that enabled the building's defenders to shoot arrows at attackers who breached the external walls. The core building was linked to the external fortifications by corridors and chambers.

=== Construction phases ===
Though large parts of the building are in ruins, excavations have determined that al-Rahba went through at least eight undated construction phases probably starting from the early Ayyubid period. For the most part, each phase utilized different architectural techniques and fortification concepts, and none of the phases affected the entire extent of the building at one time. One common theme of the phases was the restoration or strengthening of al-Rahba's western and southeastern sides, which faced the desert plateau and were the most exposed areas of the fortress. In contrast, the northern side facing the population centers remained largely unchanged.

The first phase saw the walls built with mudbrick, a very common feature of Euphrates-area structures. Although the shape of the building after its initial phase cannot be determined, Paillet presumes that its size likely corresponded to that of the current building. The small salient bastion that juts out of the northern wall dates to the first phase.

The second phase of construction added three salient bastions, each of which were over twice the size of the northern bastion. The new bastions were placed along the part of al-Rahba's citadel that faced the desert to the west. The builders in the second phase also reinforced al-Rahba's walls with roughly cut conglomerate blocks fixed together by high-quality mortar. In the third phase, higher quality mudbrick was used, the western curtain wall was elevated and the southwestern curtain wall was replaced and decorated with bands of Arabic inscriptions. In addition, a large, brick dome was built atop the ground-level chamber of the northwestern bastion. The external walls of the fortress reached their final form during the third phase, though there would be further restorations in later decades.

In the fourth phase, low-lying casemates were added to the western and southwestern curtains to provide an additional platform for al-Rahba's defenders to use. The walls, particularly on the eastern side, were reinforced in the fifth phase, which Paillet attributes to the efforts of Shirkuh II and his Ayyubid contemporaries to strengthen the fortresses of Syria. The building technique used in this phase likely necessitated significant funds, equipment and technical expertise. Several changes were made including the southeastern tower being rebuilt and the northeastern tower being reinforced by an additional wall and a vaulted story. Moreover, the northern slope of the outer wall was further strengthened with a glacis built from large conglomerate blocks. A building in the center of al-Rahba was erected during this phase, likely replacing an older structure or a courtyard.

The last major building phase was the sixth, which saw the restoration of the eastern and western external walls after they were severely damaged by Mongol besiegers. A northeastern salient bastion, much smaller than the eastern and western bastions, was also built. Masonry from the fifth phase was reused for the reconstruction along with new gypsum, limestone and other materials. The seventh and eighth phases both consisted of heightening al-Rahba's western external walls.

== See also ==
- List of Kurdish castles
- List of castles in Syria

== Bibliography ==
- Amabe, Fukuzo (2016). Urban Autonomy in Medieval Islam: Damascus, Aleppo, Cordoba, Toledo, Valencia and Tunis. Leiden: Brill. ISBN 9789004315983.
- Amitai-Preiss, Reuven (1995). Mongols and Mamluks: The Mamluk-Îlkhânid War, 1260–1281. Cambridge, UK; New York, USA: Cambridge University Press. ISBN 978-0-521-46226-6.
- Ashtor, Eliyahu (1976). A Social and Economic History of the Near East in the Middle Ages. Collins. ISBN 978-0-520-02962-0.
- Bianquis, Thierry (1993). "Mirdās, Banū or Mirdāsids". In Bosworth, C. E.; van Donzel, E.; Heinrichs, W. P. & Pellat, Ch. (eds.). The Encyclopaedia of Islam, Second Edition. Volume VII: Mif–Naz. Leiden: E. J. Brill. pp. 115–123. ISBN 978-90-04-09419-2.
- Bianquis, Thierry (1995). "Al-Raḥba". In Bosworth, C. E.; van Donzel, E.; Heinrichs, W. P. & Lecomte, G. (eds.). The Encyclopaedia of Islam, Second Edition. Volume VIII: Ned–Sam. Leiden: E. J. Brill. ISBN 978-90-04-09834-3.
- Başan, Aziz (2010). The Great Seljuqs: A History. Abingdon: Routledge. ISBN 978-0-203-84923-1.
- "Būyid-Ḥamdānid Relations". Islamic Culture. 72 (4). Hyderabad-Deccan: Islamic Culture Board. January 1998.
- Bylinski, Janusz (1999). "Qal'at Shirkuh at Palmyra: A Medieval Fortress Reinterpreted". Bulletin d'études orientales. 51. Institut Francais du Proche-Orient: 151–208. JSTOR 41608461.
- Bylinski, Janusz (2004). "Three Minor Fortresses in the Realm of the Ayyubid Rulers of Homs in Syria: Shumaimis, Tadmur (Palmyra) and al-Rahba". In Faucherre, Nicolas; Mesqui, Jean; Prouteau, Nicolas (eds.). La fortification au temps des croisades. Presses universitaires Rennes. ISBN 978-2-86847-944-0.
- Halm, Heinz (1996). Bonner, Michael (ed.). The Empire of the Mahdi: The Rise of the Fatimids. Leiden: Brill. ISBN 90-04-10056-3.
- Ibn al-Athir, Ali (2010). Richards, D. S. (ed.). The Chronicle of Ibn Al-Athir for the Crusading Period from Al-Kamil Fi'L-Ta'Rikh.: The Years 491-541/1097-1146 the Coming of the Franks and the Muslim Response. Ashgate Publishing Limited. ISBN 9780754669500.
- Zakkar, Suhayl (1971). The Emirate of Aleppo: 1004–1094. Aleppo: Dar al-Amanah.
