= Maksim Borodin =

Russian reporter (1985–2018)

Maksim Borodin (Russian: Максим Бородин; 1985 – 15 April 2018) was a Russian investigative journalist. On 12 April 2018 he was severely injured after falling from his fifth-floor balcony in Yekaterinburg. He was placed in a coma, but died from his injuries on 15 April.

== Life ==
Borodin was a reporter for the Yekaterinburg’s Novy Den website.

Borodin had a reputation for investigating prisons and corrupt officials in his native Sverdlovsk Oblast. He was also known for his investigation into the activities of ultra-conservative monarchist organizations. After an interview dedicated to them, he was beaten. On the eve of the attack in October 2017, he received threats that "all the punishment of Heavens" would fall upon him.

He had also investigated political scandals, including allegations made by a Belarusian escort known as Nastya Rybka in a video posted by Russian opposition leader Alexei Navalny.

In the months leading up to his death, Borodin gained national attention after he wrote about the deaths of several Russian citizens, reported to be Wagner PMCs, in a confrontation with US-backed forces in eastern Syria in early February. Throughout February and March, Borodin interviewed the relatives and commanders of those killed, and attended their funerals in the town of Asbest.

== Death ==
On 12 April 2018, was found badly injured at the foot of the building, where he lived in Yekaterinburg, Sverdlovsk Oblast, Russia. The authorities said the door of his flat had been locked from the inside.

The day before his fall, Borodin told his friend that he had seen armed, camouflaged men near his flat. Following this, he attempted to find a lawyer. Later, however, Borodin called his friend again and said he had made a mistake, and that he thought the men had been taking part in some kind of training exercise.

Following Borodin's death, Polina Rumyantseva, the editor of Novy Den (Borodin's employer), said in an interview that reporters from the paper had visited his apartment and had not seen any signs of a struggle. The investigators believed that Borodin had gone on the balcony to smoke and had fallen. Still, Rumyantseva stated "If there's even a hint of something criminal, we will make it public".

On 23 April 2018, the official investigation reported that it had found no reason to initiate a criminal case, although representatives of UNESCO and the OSCE earlier demanded a thorough investigation into the death of Maksim Borodin. A journalist from the Novaya Gazeta newspaper who visited the accident site, noted that the police did not make any interviews with neighbors. Mary Ilyushina, the author of a CNN article, drew parallels with the death of entrepreneur Valery Pshenichny, who was raped, tortured and hanged in pretrial detention. The Investigative Committee of Russia ruled this death a suicide.

A few months after Borodin’s death, three journalists were killed in the Central African Republic, who investigated the activities of the Wagner group. Discussing this case, Julia Ioffe said: "It sure seems like a hell of a coincidence that all four Russian investigative journalists that turned up dead in the last few months were investigating Wagner".

On 14 January 2019, the Justice for Journalists Foundation of Mikhail Khodorkovsky announced its 2019 grant programme. An investigation into the death of Maksim Borodin was mentioned among three possible investigations, dedicated to the crimes against journalists committed in 2017–2018.

== See also ==
- Battle of Khasham
- Wagner Group
- Ivan Safronov
