= Mahkan, Syria =

Mahkan مَحْكَان
- Town
- Location in Syria
- Coordinates: 34°58′28″N 40°29′8″E
- Country: Syria
- Governorate: Deir ez-Zor
- District: Mayadin
- Subdistrict: Mayadin

Population (2004)
  - Total: 10,086
- Time zone: UTC+3 (AST)
- City Qrya Pcode: C5174

Mahkan (Arabic: مَحْكَان, romanized: Maḥkān) is a Syrian town located in Mayadin District, Deir ez-Zor. According to the Syria Central Bureau of Statistics (CBS), Mahkan had a population of 10,086 in the 2004 census. During Syria Civil war, Mahkan was occupied by ISIS and was captured by Syrian Army on 23 October 2017.
