= Abu Khashab =

Abu Khashab أبو خشب
- Town
- Location in Syria
- Coordinates: 35°56′9″N 40°2′12″E
- Country: Syria
- Governorate: Deir ez-Zor
- District: Deir ez-Zor
- Subdistrict: al-Kasrah

Population (2004)
  - Total: 9,046
- Time zone: UTC+3 (AST)
- City Qrya Pcode: C5098

Abu Khashab (Arabic: أبو خشب) is a Syrian town located in Deir ez-Zor District, Deir ez-Zor. According to the Syria Central Bureau of Statistics (CBS), Abu Khashab had a population of 9,046 in the 2004 census.

== Syrian civil war ==
Abu Khashab is home to the only IDP camp in the Deir ez-Zor Governorate. It was established in 2017 and as of May 2024 it had a population of 10,842.

On 27 April 2022, seven people were shot dead and four others were wounded in a massacre committed by Islamic State fighters when they attacked the house of the chief of the relations office of Deir ez-Zor Civil Council in the town.
