= Khasham =

Khasham خِشَام
- Town
- Location in Syria
- Coordinates: 35°17′55″N 40°17′36″E
- Country: Syria
- Governorate: Deir ez-Zor
- District: Deir ez-Zor
- Subdistrict: Khasham

Population (2004)
  - Total: 7,021
- Time zone: UTC+2 (EET)
  - Summer (DST): UTC+3 (EEST)
- City Qrya Pcode: C5140

Khasham, also romanized as Khusham or Khsham (Arabic: خِشَام, romanized: Khišām), is a Syrian town located in Deir ez-Zor District, Deir ez-Zor Governorate. According to the Syrian Central Bureau of Statistics, Khasham had a population of 7,021 in the 2004 census.

== Geography ==
Khasham is located on the Euphrates river, on its east bank. It is located to the southeast of the regional capital Deir ez-Zor.

== History ==
During the Syrian civil war, Khasham was part of a large territory in Deir ez-Zor Governorate seized by forces of the self-styled Islamic State (IS) terrorist group during its 2014 offensive in the region. The Syrian Observatory for Human Rights (SOHR) reported that on June 23, 2014, IS militants forced residents of Khasham and Tabyeh to leave the towns, telling them to "accept their repentance" after resisting the group. By July 8, the SOHR reported that the militants were not allowing residents of the two towns to return home. The oil fields in Khasham served as a "major source of revenue" for ISIS during its occupation of the town.

In January 2016, the SOHR reported that sixty-three people in Khasham had been killed in airstrikes by Russian fighter planes. In April 2016, another airstrike, this time by the U.S.-led coalition, targeted a gas distribution station in ISIS-occupied Khasham, and killed at least eight people, according to activists. In September 2017, the oil fields near Khasham were captured by the Autonomous Administration of North and East Syria (AANES) during a campaign by the Syrian Democratic Forces (SDF), supported by the United States-led CJTF–OIR coalition. However, according to conflict mapping service Liveuamap, Khasham proper was captured by the Assad regime, not the AANES.

On February 7, 2018, the area near the town was the site of the day-long Battle of Khasham, in which pro-Bashar al-Assad forces, including the Russian mercenary Wagner Group, advanced and opened fire on an outpost manned by the United States and allied SDF forces. After Russian officials claimed the Wagner forces were "not their people", the American and SDF forces bombarded the attackers, killing an estimated 200–300 pro-regime fighters, including many Russians.

As of March 2021, the "Conoco" outpost near Khasham - named for the American gas company Conoco that once operated the oil fields - was one of the last bases where American soldiers were still stationed on Syrian territory. According to media reports, Russian and allied Syrian troops were located "just across the Euphrates" from the base, "but both sides avoid[ed] straying into the other's territory."

In December 2023, Syrian nonprofit organization Enab Baladi reported on the effects of electricity rationing in Deir ez-Zor and the surrounding regime-controlled villages, including Khasham, noting that blackouts "can reach up to 22 hours of cuts for only two hours of power connection, with some neighborhoods experiencing days without electricity."

In December 2024, it was captured by the Syrian Democratic Forces during the Deir ez-Zor offensive.
