= Al-Asharah =

Al-Asharah ٱلْعَشَارَة
- Town
- Location within Syria
- Coordinates: 34°55′13″N 40°33′34″E
- Country: Syria
- Governorate: Deir ez-Zor
- District: Mayadin
- Subdistrict: Al-Asharah

Population (2004 census)
  - Total: 17,537
- Time zone: UTC+2 (EET)
  - Summer (DST): UTC+3 (EEST)

Al-Asharah (Arabic: ٱلْعَشَارَة, romanized: al-ʿAšārah, also spelled al-Ashareh or Esharah) is a town in eastern Syria, administratively part of the Deir ez-Zor Governorate, located along the Euphrates River, south of Deir ez-Zor. Nearby localities include al-Quriyah to the northeast, Makhan and Mayadin to the north, Suwaydan Jazirah to the southeast and Dablan to the south. According to the Syria Central Bureau of Statistics, al-Asharah had a population of 17,537 in the 2004 census. It is the administrative seat of a nahiyah ("subdistrict") which consists of seven localities with a total population of 96,001 in 2004. Al-Asharah is the third largest locality in the nahiyah. Its inhabitants are predominantly Sunni Muslims from the Arabic tribes of Tayy Al-Rahabi and Al-Uqaydat.

Al-Asharah is the administrative center of Nahiya al-Asharah of the Mayadin District.

== History ==
Al-Asharah is built on the site of the ancient Aramean-Assyrian settlement of Terqa. A stele dated to 886 BCE honoring the victory of Assyrian king Tukulti-Ninurta II over the Arameans was found in al-Asharah. The stele is currently located in the National Museum of Aleppo. Excavations in al-Asharah revealed evidence that Terqa contained urban institutions and its inhabitants had exploited the area's soil for economic benefit.

In the mid-19th-century, it was noted by the Bombay Geographic Society that al-Asharah was a "little town" that consisted of an unorganized grouping of Arab huts and a population whose traditions suggested the place was ancient. From around that time until the dissolution of the Ottoman Empire in 1917, al-Asharah served as the center of a kaza ("district"), bearing its name, that was part of the larger Sanjak of Zor province. The kaza had two nawahi: al-Asharah and al-Busayrah.

In 1920, a meeting between officials and officers of the Sharifian Army and the nascent Kingdom of Syria was held in al-Asharah and hosted by Emir Faisal. There negotiations over the borders between Syria and Iraq were discussed and it was concluded the Abu Kamal would remain a part of the Deir ez-Zor province of Syria.

In the early 1960s al-Asharah was described as a small village built on an artificial mound where Terqa stood.

During the Syrian Civil War, the city was captured by ISIL during the second half of 2014. On 6 June 2016, it was bombed by regime forces, resulting in the death of 17 civilians. The Syrian army captured town in 27 November 2017.

== Bibliography ==
- Boulanger, Robert (1966). The Middle East, Lebanon, Syria, Jordan, Iraq, Iran. Hachette.
- Nelles Guide (1999). Syria and Lebanon. Hunter Publishing, Inc. ISBN 3886181057.
- Rush, Alan de Lacy (2001). Records of Iraq, 1914-1966. Vol. 2. Archive Editions. ISBN 1852078200.
- Smith, Eli; Robinson, Edward (1841). Biblical Researches in Palestine, Mount Sinai and Arabia Petraea: A Journal of Travels in the Year 1838. Vol. 3. Crocker and Brewster.
