= ISIS Hunters =

Syrian Army unit of the Wagner Group

- Insignia of the ISIS Hunters unit
- Active: 2017–2024
- Disbanded: 2024
- Country: Ba'athist Syria; Russian Federation
- Allegiance: Wagner Group
- Branch: Syrian Army
- Type: Infantry, special forces
- Role: Shock troopers, asset protection, counter-terrorism, and counterinsurgency
- Size: Few dozens to less than 100
- Part of: Syrian Army; 5th Assault Corps
- Base of Operations: Palmyra
- Nicknames: Arabic: صائدوا داعش; Russian: Охотники за ИГИЛ
- Engagements: Syrian Civil War; Palmyra offensive (March 2016); Palmyra offensive (December 2016); Palmyra offensive (2017); Battle of Khasham; Syrian Desert campaign (2017 – 2024)

The ISIS Hunters (Arabic: صائدوا داعش, Russian: Охотники за ИГИЛ) were a special forces unit of the Wagner Group, formed in 2017 during the Syrian civil war. The unit was informal part of Wagner PMC and fought as part of the Syrian Army's 5th Assault Corps in Syria. Between 2021 and 2023, the unit was considered to be formally dissolved. However, their actions and patches were still being posted on Russian Special Forces Telegram, proving that the unit still existed and was performing operations going into 2024, until the fall of the Assad Regime.

== Foundation ==
The ISIS Hunters were formed in early 2017. The group's Facebook page appeared on February 27, and the following day, it also registered on Twitter. The Syrian government's need for such unit was driven after the rout of the Syrian regime's forces in the Battle of Palmyra in December 2016.

Its name meant "Islamic State Hunters", the acronym for the jihadist group being "ISIS" in English. Its fighters are integrated into the 5th Army Corps, a formation formed in November 2016 with Russian support, composed entirely of volunteers.

According to Stéphane Mantoux, a history professor specializing in the Iraqi-Syrian conflict: "Russia is also seeking to build forces that could serve as a counterweight to Iran, whose objectives in Syria differed from those of Moscow".

The training of the ISIS Hunters was supervised by the Russians and in particular by the PMC Wagner Group. Its weapons and equipment were also supplied by Russia. At the same time, ISIS Hunters became used by Russian authorities to protect their economic interests. Thus, fighters were brought in to protect oil and gas fields.

== History ==
The ISIS Hunters were formed in early 2017 after the Syrian Arab Armed Forces were routed in the December 2016 battle of Palmyra. The group's fighters were integrated into the 5th Army Corps, a formation formed in November 2016 with Russian support, composed entirely of volunteers.

Russia's goal in forming the ISIS Hunters was to combat ISIS and build forces that can serve as a counterweight to Iran in Syria, as their objectives in the region differ from those of Moscow. The training of the ISIS Hunters was supervised by the Russians, particularly by the private military company Wagner Group, and their weapons and equipment are also supplied by Russia.

The ISIS Hunters were linked to the story of Russian soldiers Roman Zabolotny and Grigory Tsurkanu, who were captured by militants. On 5 October 2017, a report appeared on the official Twitter account of the unit that it was willing to pay a million dollars for each prisoner's.

The unit was merged/affiliated with private military company known as Al-Sayad Security Company, which was located in the city of Al-Suqaylabiyah. The company was formed in March 2017. It recruited volunteers from 22 to 46 years old with good physical training.

== Formation ==
The unit was part of the 5th Army Corps's. According to other information the ISIS Hunters were an independent formation in their own right. In addition, the unit was voluntary, and service in it was not equivalent to regular military service in the Ba'athist Syrian Government's Army.

The group's number was estimated between 20 up to several dozen men in 2017. Many of them had relatives killed by ISIS militants. Personnel training was overseen by Russians from PMC Wagner. Weapons and equipment were also supplied by Russia. Recruits arrived from many areas including the coastal region, northern and southeastern rural areas of Hama. The recruitment in ISIS Hunters was based on a whole series of rigorous harsh training courses that required the fighter to be familiar with all combat specialities. The unit's training centre was located at Latakia.

Equipment was represented by standard uniforms, helmets and body armour. Armament consists of assault rifles AK-47, AKS-74U, AK-74M and AKM, grenade launchers RPG-7 and machine guns. There were also drones and 122 mm D-30 howitzers available to them.

== Known engagements ==
On 23 March 2017, North of Palmyra in the Al-Shaer gas field area, the unit engaged 120 Islamic State fighters, killing 24 militants and wounding 12 others. Also ISIS Hunters destroyed an enemy anti-aircraft gun using a drone. They were supported by Syrian T-72 tanks in the clash.

The formation was particularly distinguished in clearing the "cauldron" near Aqrabat and also for managing to take control of Jabal al-Bilas.

During the offensive near Deir ez-Zor in September of that year, the unit became the first to cross the Euphrates.

In February 2018, the ISIS Hunters were engaged in the Battle of Khasham near Deir ez-Zor against the Syrian Democratic Forces. During this battle, they were subjected to U.S. bombing, resulting in the alleged loss of between 80 and 100 of their men. Following this incident, the group issued a statement about the casualties they suffered during the fighting, claiming to have lost twenty men during this fighting.

As of April 2019, the unit lost 30 killed, of which 20 were killed in February 2018 near Khasham when they were caught in airstrikes of the US Air Force.

== Notable personnel ==
The group's strength was likely less than 100 in total. No official number of "ISIS Hunters" troops have been published by Syria. The group's strength likely numbers a few dozen men. Some of its fighters in propaganda videos appear to be particularly elderly and look especially old. The group is composed mostly of Russians.

=== Notable personnel ===
- Nadhim Mikhail Shahada — field commander in Deir ez-Zor.
- Amir Ahmad Ahmad — one of the fighters. On 14 May 2017, he issued a video message accusing the Americans of having ties to ISIL and condemned shairat base missile strikes.
- Ivan Slyshkin — PMC Wagner employee. He participated in training the fighters of the ISIS Hunters. He died on 12 February 2017 at the hands of sniper near the Shaer gas field.

== Description of the flag ==
In the centre of the emblem is a skull and crossbones in a target (the symbol of the Syrian Republican Guard), on the sides are bullet holes, and at the top and bottom is the inscription "ISIS Hunters" in English and Arabic.

== Areas of operation ==
The unit had fought in the following regions:

- Palmyra (in early 2017, the IS Hunters were responsible here for protecting the military airport as well as gas and oil fields)
- Deir ez-Zor (recorded participation in battle of Khasham near Deir ez-Zor against the Syrian Democratic Forces)
- Shayer (Homs Desert gas field region), Akrabat (rural area in Hama)
- Jazal (oil region in Homs Desert), Ghouta (under Damascam), desert areas.
- Ghouta (near Damascus)
- Other desert areas
