= Tabiyet Jazira =

Tabiyet Jazira طابية جزيرة
- Town
- Location in Syria
- Coordinates: 35°16′50″N 40°18′55″E
- Country: Syria
- Governorate: Deir ez-Zor
- District: Deir ez-Zor District
- Subdistrict: Khasham Subdistrict

Population (2004)
  - Total: 1,801
- Time zone: UTC+3 (AST)
- City Qrya Pcode: C5144

Tabiyet Jazira, alternatively rendered as at Tabiyah, al Tabiyeh, Al Tabiyyah, Al Tabiya or Al Tabiah (Arabic: طابية جزيرة), is a town in Deir ez-Zor District, Deir ez-Zor Governorate, Syria. According to the Syria Central Bureau of Statistics (CBS), Tabiyah had a population of 1,801 in the 2004 census.

== Geography ==
Tabiyet Jazira is located on the Euphrates river, on the east bank. The Tabiya (or "Conoco", after the company ConocoPhillips) gas field and plant lie about 6 kilometres (3.7 mi) to the north of the town.

== History ==
On 7 February 2018, during the Battle of Khasham of the Syrian civil war, a pro-regime Syrian tribal militia group advanced under cover of night from Tabiyet Jazira and attacked a Syrian Democratic Forces (SDF) base near Khasham. The attack was unsuccessful, as the SDF's American allies "struck back with their entire destructive arsenal", leading to high casualties among the pro-regime forces, including Russian mercenary Wagner Group soldiers.
