= Mayadin =

Mayadin ٱلْمِيَادِين
- Town
- Location in Syria
- Coordinates: 35°1′6″N 40°27′12″E
- Country: Syria
- Governorate: Deir ez-Zor
- District: Mayadin
- Subdistrict: Mayadin
- Elevation: 195 m (640 ft)

Population (2004)
  - Total: 44,028
- Time zone: UTC+3 (AST)
- Climate: BWh

Mayadin (Arabic: ٱلْمِيَادِين/ALA-LC: al-Miyādīn) is a town in eastern Syria. It is the capital of the Mayadin District, part of the Deir ez-Zor Governorate. Mayadin is about 44 kilometers southeast of Deir ez-Zor. The Euphrates River flows through the town. In the 2004 census, the population was 44,028, making it the second most populous town in the governorate.

== History ==
=== Ancient era ===
Mayadin has been identified to be the ancient Audattha known to Ptolemy, though some suggest Audattha was where Haditha now stands in Iraq.

=== Middle Ages ===
Mayadin is the successor of the medieval town and fortress of Rahbat Malik ibn Tawk, founded by the Abbasid lord and the original town's namesake, Malik ibn Tawk. Strategically located at a crossroads on the western bank of the Euphrates and considered the key to Syria from Iraq, control of the town was highly contested by the Muslim powers and Bedouin tribes of the region. It grew to become one of the major Muslim towns of the Euphrates valley and was an administrative center.

An earthquake destroyed Rahbat Malik ibn Tawk in 1157, after which it was granted by the Zengid ruler Nur ad-Din to Asad ad-Din Shirkuh, the paternal uncle of future Ayyubid sultan, Saladin. Shirkuh relocated the fortress about four kilometers southwest of the original site. The new settlement, known as "al-Rahba al-Jadida", remained the significant center of the Euphrates region through much of the Ayyubid–Mamluk era (12th–15th centuries), and today is a ruined fortress known as "Qal'at al-Rahba". The original settlement eventually became known as "Mashhad Rahba". The latter was located at the present site of Mayadin.

=== Modern era ===
Mayadin is the administrative center of Mayadin Subdistrict and the Mayadin District.

In the early 20th century, Mayadin was the administrative seat of the Asharah kaza (subdistrict) of the Sanjak of Zor district and contained the residence of its qaimmaqam (governor). In a British military intelligence report from the 1900s, the town had a population of 2,000 mostly Sunni Muslims and a small minority of Christians. There was a bazaar, several shops and a mosque with a leaning minaret. According to Czech explorer Alois Musil, who visited in 1912, Mayadin had a garrison of twelve gendarmes, ten policemen and ten mule riders. There was a boys' primary school in the town. The population was about 2,500, consisting of roughly four hundred Muslim families, fifteen Syriac Orthodox families (mostly refugees from Mardin), and three Jewish families, living in a total of 380 houses. On June 19, 1947, Pan Am Flight 121, crewed by third officer Gene Roddenberry (who went on to create the original Star Trek television series), crashed 4 miles (6.4 km) from the town.

==== Syrian Civil War ====
The town was captured by the Free Syrian Army in late August 2012, with the only part still in regime hands being the Mayadin military base, an artillery position on a hill overlooking the town, which in turn was captured on 22 November. This gave the rebels control of a large amount of territory east of the base to the Iraqi border. On 3 July 2014, ISIS captured Mayadin after ousting the local FSA rebels and raised their black standard. A local underground resistance movement of tribal fighters attacked ISIS checkpoints in the city in 2015. This forced ISIS militants to dig a 15 km (9 mi) defensive position around the city.

On 3 April 2017, during the SDF's offensive to capture Raqqa, it was reported that ISIS was possibly in the process of moving its capital from Raqqa city to Mayadin. This followed months of gradual relocation of resources and senior ISIS leaders from Raqqa to Mayadin. On 21 April 2017, the United States announced that they had conducted a ground raid in Mayadin and killed Abdulrakhman Uzbeki, an ISIS leader.

On 18 June 2017, Iran hit ISIS targets in Mayadin using domestic-based surface-to-surface mid-range missiles.

By the 10 October 2017, the town was besieged by the SAA and fighting had begun in the suburbs in preparation to storm the town.

On 11 October 2017, the Syrian Army made huge advances inside the town of Mayadin and has taken control of about 60 percent of the town.

On 14 October 2017, the Syrian Arab Army retook the town thus ending the 4 year long ISIS rule over it.

In June 2018, ISIS unsuccessfully attempted to retake the town.

== Sport ==
There is a football club in the city called Al-Mayadin SC, which plays the second highest competition in Syria.

== Climate ==
Mayadin has a hot desert climate (Köppen climate classification BWh).

Climate data for Mayadin
Month	Jan	Feb	Mar	Apr	May	Jun	Jul	Aug	Sep	Oct	Nov	Dec	Year
Mean daily maximum °C (°F)	13.2 (55.8)	16.1 (61.0)	20.3 (68.5)	26.1 (79.0)	32.1 (89.8)	37.7 (99.9)	40.4 (104.7)	40.3 (104.5)	35.9 (96.6)	29.7 (85.5)	21.8 (71.2)	15.1 (59.2)	27.4 (81.3)
Daily mean °C (°F)	7.9 (46.2)	10.0 (50.0)	13.6 (56.5)	18.8 (65.8)	24.4 (75.9)	29.5 (85.1)	32.3 (90.1)	32.1 (89.8)	27.7 (81.9)	21.7 (71.1)	14.8 (58.6)	9.5 (49.1)	20.2 (68.3)
Mean daily minimum °C (°F)	2.7 (36.9)	3.9 (39.0)	6.9 (44.4)	11.6 (52.9)	16.7 (62.1)	21.4 (70.5)	24.3 (75.7)	24.0 (75.2)	19.5 (67.1)	13.8 (56.8)	7.8 (46.0)	3.9 (39.0)	13.0 (55.5)
Average precipitation mm (inches)	27 (1.1)	22 (0.9)	23 (0.9)	21 (0.8)	9 (0.4)	0 (0)	0 (0)	0 (0)	1 (0.0)	7 (0.3)	12 (0.5)	24 (0.9)	146 (5.7)

== Bibliography ==
- Bianquis, Thierry (1995). "Al-Raḥba". In Bosworth, C. E.; van Donzel, E.; Heinrichs, W. P. & Lecomte, G. (eds.). The Encyclopaedia of Islam, Second Edition. Volume VIII: Ned–Sam. Leiden: E. J. Brill. ISBN 978-90-04-09834-3.
