= Mayadin District =

Mayadin District منطقة الميادين
- District
- Mayadin District (in yellow) within Deir ez-Zor Governorate
- Coordinates (Mayadin): 35°01′N 40°27′E
- Country: Syria
- Governorate: Deir ez-Zor
- Seat: Mayadin
- Sub-districts: 3

Area
  - Total: 3,954.98 km^{2} (1,527.03 sq mi)

Population (2004)
  - Total: 247,171
  - Density: 62.4961/km^{2} (161.864/sq mi)
- Geocode: SY0902

Mayadin District (Arabic: منطقة الميادين) is a district (mantiqah) of Deir ez-Zor Governorate, Syria. According to the 2004 census, the district had a population of 247,171. It is subdivided into three sub-districts (nawāḥī).

== Geography ==
Mayadin is one of the three administrative districts (mantiqah) of Deir ez-Zor Governorate, Syria, alongside Deir ez-Zor District and Abu Kamal District. The district is situated in the southeastern part of the governorate. It is bordered by Deir ez-Zor District to the north and east, Abu Kamal District to the south, and Homs Governorate to the west. It is located in the Euphrates River basin.

Mayadin, located on the banks of the Euphrates, is the seat of the district, and is located about 45 km (28 mi) from the provincial capital of Deir ez-Zor. The district is subdivided into three sub-districts (nawāḥī)–Mayadin, Diban (Thiban), and Al-Asharah.

== Demographics ==
According to the 2004 census, Mayadin District had a population of 247,171, comprising 126,761 males and 120,410 females. The district had 30,473 households, with an average household size of 8.11 people. The illiteracy rates were 26.16% among males and 53.89% among females. About 24.51% of the population was self-employed, 39% was in paid employment, and 29.57% worked without pay. Approximately 92.65% of houses were owner-occupied. The Mayadin subdistrict had approximately 86,000 inhabitants including approximately 44,000 in Mayadin city.

In August 2020, the United Nations estimated the population of Mayadin District at 106,010. The district was affected by the Syrian civil war, which began in 2011, which resulted in damage to local infrastructure and basic services, as well as large-scale displacement of people. As per the UN assessment, an estimated 62,057 people in the district were in need of humanitarian assistance.

== Economy ==
The Euphrates is the major source of water for supporting agriculture and allied industries. Flooding in the river caused extensive damage in 2026. The district's agricultural activities were supported by a joint initiative involving the United Nations Development Programme, the Food and Agriculture Organization, the United Nations Population Fund and the Government of Italy since 2021.
