= List of wars and battles involving the Islamic State =

Current military situation (as of February 2026): Controlled by the Islamic State Controlled by the Main Syrian rebels Controlled by the Syrian Government Controlled by Iraqi government Controlled by Syrian Kurdistan Controlled by Iraqi Kurdistan Controlled by the Lebanese Government Controlled by Hezbollah

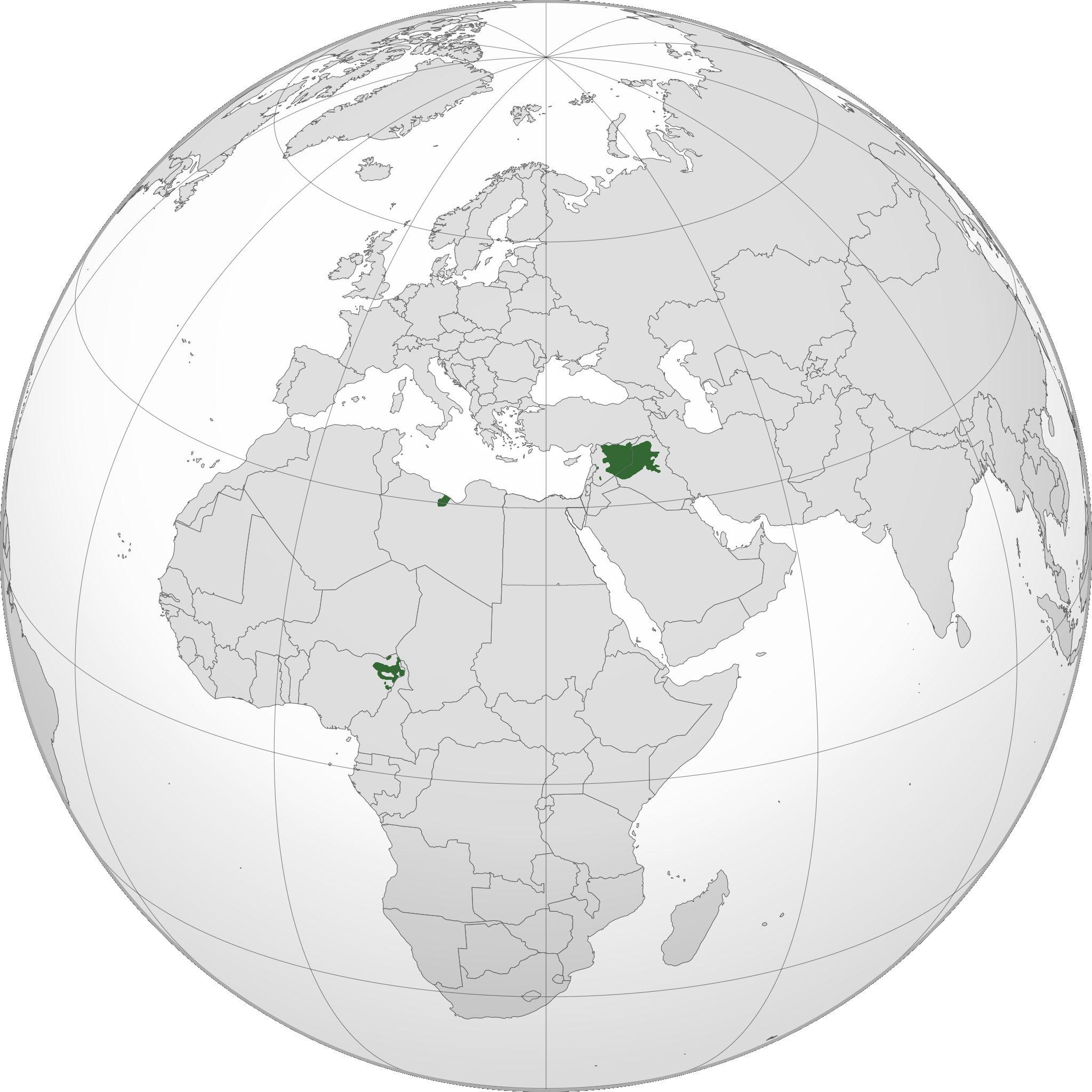
Territory held by the Islamic State in May 2015

The following is a list of conflicts involving the jihadist militant group known as the Islamic State (IS/ISIL/ISIS/Daesh), throughout its various incarnations. The group controlled portions of territory in Iraq and Syria in the mid-2010s and has taken part in many attacks, battles and wars.

== Wars ==
Since late 2013, the wars in Syria have merged into a single war that includes a spillover into Lebanon and Iraq.

- War on terror
  - War against the Islamic State
    - United States intervention in Syria
    - US-led intervention in Iraq (2014–2021)
    - German intervention against the Islamic State
    - Jordanian intervention in the Syrian civil war
    - Russian intervention in the Syrian civil war
    - Operation Euphrates Shield
    - Iranian intervention in Iraq (2014–present)
  - Iraqi conflict
    - Iraqi insurgency (2011–2013)
    - War in Iraq (2013–2017)
    - Iraqi insurgency (2017–present)
  - Syrian civil war
    - Syrian civil war spillover in Lebanon
    - Turkish involvement in the Syrian civil war
    - Inter-rebel conflict during the Syrian civil war
    - Turkey–Islamic State conflict
    - Israeli–Syrian ceasefire line incidents during the Syrian civil war
    - Rojava Revolution
      - Rojava–Islamist conflict
  - Sinai insurgency
  - Terrorism in Egypt (2013–present)
  - Libyan civil war (2014–2020)
  - Afghan conflict
    - War in Afghanistan (2001–2021)
      - Insurgency in Khyber Pakhtunkhwa
      - Islamic State–Taliban conflict
      - Balkhab uprising
    - 2026 Afghanistan-Pakistan War
  - Civil conflict in the Philippines
    - Moro conflict
    - ISIL insurgency in the Philippines
  - Insurgency in Cabo Delgado
  - Yemeni Civil War
    - Saudi Arabian-led intervention in Yemen
    - Al-Qaeda insurgency in Yemen
  - Boko Haram insurgency
    - 2015 Niger raid
  - Insurgency in the North Caucasus
    - Islamic State insurgency in the North Caucasus
      - Islamic State insurgency in Azerbaijan
  - Insurgency in the Maghreb (2002–present)
    - War in the Sahel
      - Islamic State insurgency in Tunisia
      - Islamist insurgency in Northern Benin
      - Islamist insurgency in Burkina Faso
      - Islamist insurgency in Niger
      - JNIM–ISSP conflict
  - Somali Civil War
    - Somali Civil War (2009–present)
    - Islamic State Insurgency in Puntland
  - Terrorism in Bangladesh
  - Gaza–Israel conflict
  - Salafi-jihadist insurgency in the Gaza Strip
  - Kivu conflict
  - Allied Democratic Forces insurgency
  - Al-Qaeda–Islamic State conflict

=== Battles ===
==== Jama'at al-Tawhid wal-Jihad ====
Battle	Allies	Opponents	Outcome
First Battle of Fallujah	Jama'at al-Tawhid wal-Jihad; Islamic Army in Iraq; Army of the Men of the Naqshbandi Order	United States	Victory
2004 Good Friday ambush	Mujahideen Shura; Organization of Monotheism and Jihad; Mahdi Army	United States; U.S. Army; KBR, Inc.	Victory
Battle of Samarra (2004)	Jama'at al-Tawhid wal-Jihad; Ba'ath Party loyalists	United States; Iraq	Defeat

==== Al-Qaeda in Iraq ====
Battle	Allies	Opponents	Outcome
Second Battle of Fallujah	Al-Qaeda in Iraq; Islamic Army in Iraq; Ansar al-Sunnah; 1920 Revolution Brigades	United States; Iraq; United Kingdom	Defeat
Battle of Mosul (2004)	Al-Qaeda in Iraq; Ansar al-Sunna; Islamic Army in Iraq; Ba'ath Party Loyalists; Brigades of the Army of the Mustafa; Army of the Conqueror; Other Iraqi insurgents	United States (Iraq) Iraqi Security Forces (Kurdistan Region) Peshmerga	Defeat
Lake Tharthar raid	Secret Army of Islam; Ba'ath Party loyalists Al-Qaeda in Iraq; Other Iraqi insurgents	Iraq; United States	Defeat
Battle of Abu Ghraib	Iraqi insurgents: Al Qaeda in Iraq	United States	Defeat
Battle of Tal Afar (2005)	Al-Qaeda in Iraq	United States; Iraq	Defeat
Battle of Baghdad (2006–2008)	Sunni factions al-Qaeda in Iraq (until October 2006) Islamic State of Iraq (from October 2006); Sunni tribes Other militias	Public stability: (Iraq) Iraqi security forces Sunni Awakening movement United States; United Kingdom; Other coalition forces Shia factions Mahdi Army; Special Groups: Asa'ib Ahl al-Haq; Kata'ib Hezbollah; Promised Day Brigades; Badr Brigades; Rogue elements of Iraqi security forces Soldiers of Heaven; Shia tribes Other militias	Defeat
Battle of Ramadi (2006)	Mujahideen Shura Council: al-Qaeda in Iraq Later reformed as: Islamic State of Iraq	United States; United Kingdom (Iraq) New Iraqi Army	Defeat
Second Battle of Habbaniyah	Al-Qaeda in Iraq	United States	Defeat
Ramadan Offensive (2006)	Mujahideen Shura Council: Al-Qaeda in Iraq	United States; Iraq; United Kingdom; Denmark; El Salvador	Victory

==== Islamic State of Iraq ====
Battle	Allies	Opponents	Outcome
Battle of Turki	Islamic State of Iraq	United States	Defeat
Diyala campaign	Islamic State of Iraq; Other Iraqi Insurgents	United States; Iraq (Kurdistan Region) Peshmerga	Defeat
Battle of Haifa Street	Islamic State of Iraq; Other Iraqi insurgents	United States; Iraq	Indecisive
Operation Imposing Law	Islamic State of Iraq; Other Iraqi Insurgents	United States; United Kingdom; Iraq; Poland; Awakening movements in Iraq	Defeat
Operation Phantom Thunder	Islamic State of Iraq Mahdi Army Other Iraqi insurgents	United States (Iraq) Iraqi Army (Iraq) Revolution Brigade (Iraq) Awakening Movement	Defeat
Battle of Baqubah	Islamic State of Iraq	United States; Iraq	Defeat
Battle of Donkey Island	Islamic State of Iraq	United States	Defeat
Operation Shurta Nasir	Islamic State of Iraq	United States (Iraq) Iraqi Police Forces	Defeat
Operation Phantom Strike	Islamic State of Iraq Mahdi Army Other Iraqi insurgents	United States; Iraq	Indecisive
Operation Phantom Phoenix	Islamic state of Iraq; Other Iraqi Insurgents	United States; Iraq (Georgia (country)) Georgia; United Kingdom	Indecisive
Ninawa campaign	Islamic state of Iraq; Other Iraqi Insurgents	United States; Iraq	Indecisive
2008 al-Qaeda offensive in Iraq	Islamic State of Iraq	United States Army; New Iraqi Army	Indecisive
Operation Augurs of Prosperity	Islamic State of Iraq; Other Iraqi Insurgents	United States; Iraq	Defeat
Idlib Governorate clashes (September 2011 – March 2012)	Syrian Opposition; (Syrian opposition) Free Syrian Army; Ahrar al-Sham; Al-Nusra Front; Free Officers Movement (until 23 September 2011, when it joined the FSA)	(Syria) Syrian Government	Victory
Siege of Homs	Syrian Opposition; (Syria) Free Officers Movement (Note: 9 June 2011 – mid-2012 (part of the Free Syrian Army since 23 September 2011)); (Syrian opposition) Free Syrian Army (Note: From October 2011 onwards.); Islamic Front; Al-Nusra Front	(Syria) Syrian Government Hezbollah SSNP Russia	Defeat
Rif Dimashq Governorate campaign	Islamic State (IS) (surrendered)	(Syria) Syrian Arab Republic (surrendered) (until 2024); Iran (2013–2024); Russia (2015–2024); Palestine Liberation Army; PFLP–GC; Fatah al-Intifada; Hezbollah; Arab Nationalist Guard; SSNP; LAAG (from 2013) Syrian Salvation Government (Syrian opposition) Syrian Interim Government Southern Operations Room (Syria) Free Syrian Army; Al-Nusra Front; Ahrar ash-Sham; Jaysh al-Islam	Defeat
Rif Dimashq clashes (November 2011–March 2012)	Syrian Opposition; (Syrian opposition) Free Syrian Army; Ahrar al-Sham; Al-Nusra Front	(Syria) Syrian Government; PFLP–GC	Defeat
Daraa Governorate campaign	Islamic State of Iraq and the Levant (ISIL): Khalid ibn al-Walid Army; Wilayat Hawran	(Syria) Syrian Arab Republic; Iran; Russia; Palestine Liberation Army; Hezbollah; LAAG Support: Iraq; Lebanon; (Syrian opposition) Free Syrian Army; Southern Operations Room (since 2024); Hay'at Tahrir al-Sham (since 2017); Al-Nusra Front (until 2017); Ahrar al-Sham; Jaysh al-Islam	Defeat
Deir ez-Zor clashes (2011–2014)	Islamic State of Iraq and the Levant (Islamic State of Iraq until April 2013); Supported by: al-Bakkir clan al-Okaidat clan (minority)	(Syria) Syrian Arab Republic: Syrian Armed Forces; Liwa Abu al-Fadhal al-Abbas (rebel claim); Supported by: Hezbollah (Syrian opposition) Free Syrian Army (SNC-aligned units); Authenticity and Development Front; Al-Nusra Front; Ahrar al-Sham; Euphrates Islamic Liberation Front; Sons of Islam Movement; Jaysh Ahl as-Sunna wa-l-Jama’a; Jabhat al-Jihad wal-Bina' al-Islamiyya; Liwa al-Fatihoun min Ard ash-Sham; Supported by: al-Okaidat clan (majority)	Defeat
Battle of Taftanaz	Free Syrian Army: Suqour al-Sham; Liwa Dawud	(Syria) Syrian Arab Republic: Syrian Army	Defeat
2012 Aleppo Governorate clashes	Syrian Opposition; (Syrian opposition) Free Syrian Army; Al-Nusra Front; People's Protection Units	(Syria) Syrian Government	Victory
Akashat ambush	Islamic State of Iraq	(Syria) Syrian Arab Republic; Iraq	Victory

==== Islamic State of Iraq and the Levant ====
Battle	Allies	Opponents	Outcome
2012–2017 Lebanon–Syria border clashes	Free Syrian Army; Saraya Ahl al-Sham (surrendered); Al-Nusra Front^{[a]}; Islamic State (2013–17); 313 Brigade (Syria); Jaysh al-Islam; Ahrar al-Sham; Al-Qaeda and allies: Hay'at Tahrir al-Sham (2017) (surrendered); Fatah al-Islam (until 2014); Ghuraba al-Sham (until 2013); Jund al-Sham (until 2014); Abdullah Azzam Brigades; Osbat al-Ansar; Osbat al-Nour; Sunni Resistance Committees	Lebanon; Lebanese Armed Forces; Internal Security Forces; Syria; Syrian Armed Forces	Defeat
Siege of Northern Homs	Islamic State of Iraq and the Levant; Jund al-Sham: Assoud al-Islam Brigade; Bayada Martyr's Brigade (Allegedly by al-Nusra); Ahlul Sunnah wal Jama’a	(Syria) Syrian Arab Republic: Syrian Armed Forces; Military Intelligence Directorate; Russia (From 2015); Syrian Social Nationalist Party; Ba'ath Brigades; Hezbollah; Shiite Militias Northern Homs Countryside Operation Room (2015–2018): Ahrar al-Sham; Tahrir al-Sham (2017–2018, Al-Nusra Front until 2016); Sham Legion; Jaysh al-Izza; Homs Legion; Ajnad al-Homs; 313 Badr Brigade; Free Syrian Army: Jaysh al-Nasr; Harakat al-Fedayeen (From 2015); Central Region Command; National Liberation Movement; Bani Khalid Tribesmen; Authenticity and Development Front: Tawhid Army; Houla Operations Room (From 2015): Liwa Ahfad Othman; Brigade 313 – Free Men of Aqrab; Ansar al-Khilafah (From 2013); Jaysh al-Thuwar (2015); Hazzm Movement (2014)	Defeat
Idlib Governorate clashes (June 2012 – April 2013)	Syrian Opposition; Free Syrian Army; Syrian Turkmen Brigades; Al-Nusra Front; Ahrar al-Sham; Liwaa al-Umma	(Syria) Syrian Government	Stalemate
Battle of Damascus (2012)	Syrian Opposition; Free Syrian Army; Ahrar al-Sham; Al-Nusra Front	(Syria) Syrian Government	Defeat
Battle of Aleppo (2012–2016)	Fatah Halab (2015–2016); Jaysh Halab (December 2016); Army of Conquest (since mid-2016); Ansar al-Sharia (2015–2016); Free Syrian Army; Islamic State	Ba'athist Syria; Iran (from 2013); Russia (from September 2015); Allied militias: Liwa al-Quds(from 2013); Hezbollah (from 2013) (Iraq) Iraqi Shia militias (from 2013); Liwa Fatemiyoun; Liwa Zainebiyoun; Ba'ath Brigades; SSNP (from 2013); Syrian Resistance YPG^{[a]} YPJ; Army of Revolutionaries	Defeat
Siege of Nubl and al-Zahraa	Free Syrian Army; Islamic Front; Al-Nusra Front Islamic State of Iraq and the Levant	Ba'athist Syria; Iran; Russia (from late 2015); Allied militias: Hezbollah; Harakat Hezbollah al-Nujaba	Defeat
Al-Hasakah Governorate campaign (2012–2014)	Al-Qaeda; Islamic State of Iraq and the Levant; Al-Nusra Front; Ghuraba al-Sham; Ahrar al-Sham; Free Syrian Army (Note: A number of FSA groups in ceasefire with YPG since February 2013, others continued fighting the YPG.); (Syrian opposition) Syrian Revolution General Commission	(Syria) Syrian Arab Republic; Syrian Armed Forces; Sootoro; (Democratic Autonomous Administration of North and East Syria) Kurdish Supreme Committee; People's Protection Units; Women's Protection Units; Syriac Union Party; Syriac Military Council; Sutoro; Army of Dignity; Kurdistan Workers' Party	Indecisive
Raqqa campaign (2012–2013)	Syrian Islamic Front; Al-Nusra Front; Islamic Unity and Liberation Front (JWTI); Free Syrian Army; Supported by: Qatar Turkey (border clashes)	(Syria) Syrian Arab Republic: Syrian Armed Forces	Victory
Battle of Maarat al-Numan (2012)	Free Syrian Army; Al-Nusra Front	(Syria) Syrian Armed Forces	Victory
Siege of Menagh Air Base	Syrian Opposition; Free Syrian Army; Syrian Islamic Liberation Front; Al-Nusra Front; Islamic State; Jaish al-Muhajireen wal-Ansar (JAMWA)	(Syria) Syrian Government	Victory
Rif Dimashq offensive (August–October 2012)	Syrian opposition; (Syrian opposition) Free Syrian Army; Ahrar ash-Sham; Al-Nusra Front	(Syria) Syrian government	Defeat
Siege of Wadi Deif (2012–2013)	Free Syrian Army; Al-Nusra Front	(Syria) Syrian Arab Republic: Syrian Arab Armed Forces	Victory
Quneitra Governorate clashes (2012–2014)	(Syrian opposition) Syrian Opposition; (Syrian opposition) Free Syrian Army; Islamic Front; Alwiya al-Furqan; Al-Nusra Front; (Hamas) Aknaf Bait al-Maqdis; Ajnad al-Kavkaz (2014); Ahrar al-Sharkas (Became Jamaat Jund al-Qawqaz); Jamaat Jund al-Qawqaz	(Syria) Syrian Government; Arab Tawhid Party (United Nations) UNDOF	Victory
Rif Dimashq offensive (November 2012–February 2013)	Syrian opposition; (Syrian opposition) Free Syrian Army; Liwa al-Islam; Al-Nusra Front; Ahrar al-Sham	(Syria) Syrian government PFLP–GC; Liwa Abu al-Fadhal al-Abbas	Victory
Battle of Ras al-Ayn (2012–13)	(Syrian opposition) Revolutionary Military Council of Hasaka: Free Syrian Army; Ahfad al-Rasul Brigades; al-Nusra Front; Ghuraba al-Sham; Supported by: Turkey	Rojava (under the DBK): YPG; YPJ (third phase); (Syria) Syrian Arab Republic: Syrian Armed Forces	Defeat
Siege of Darayya and Muadamiyat	(Syrian opposition) Free Syrian Army (surrendered); Ajnad al-Sham Islamic Union (surrendered); Al-Nusra Front; Supported by: CIA (Military Operations Centre)	(Syria) Syrian Government; Allied militias: Hezbollah; Arab Nationalist Guard; Palestine Liberation Army	Defeat
Battle of Darayya (November 2012–February 2013)	National Coalition: Free Syrian Army; Mujahideen: Ahrar ash-Sham; Jabhat al-Nusra	(Syria) Syrian Arab Republic: Syrian Arab Armed Forces	Victory
Battle of Safira	Al-Nusra Front	Syrian Armed Forces	Indecisive
Damascus offensive (2013)	Syrian opposition; Free Syrian Army; Syrian Islamic Front; Al-Nusra Front	(Syria) Syrian government Hezbollah; PFLP–GC; Liwa Abu al-Fadhal al-Abbas	Victory
Battle of Shaddadi (2013)	Al-Nusra Front	(Syria) Syrian Arab Republic: Syrian Arab Armed Forces	Victory
Battle of Raqqa (2013)	Free Syrian Army; Syrian Islamic Front; Ahrar ash-Sham; Ansar al-Sham; Al-Qaeda; Al-Nusra Front	(Ba'athist Syria) Syrian Government	Victory
Rif Dimashq offensive (March–August 2013)	Syrian opposition; (Syrian opposition) Free Syrian Army; Syrian Islamic Liberation Front; Liwa al-Islam; Syrian Islamic Front; Ahrar ash-Sham; Battalions of Hamza ibn Abdul-Muttalib; Al-Nusra Front; Islamic State of Iraq and the Levant	(Syria) Syrian Arab Republic: Syrian Armed Forces; National Defense Force; Hezbollah; Liwa Abu al-Fadhal al-Abbas; LAAG	Defeat
Siege of Eastern Ghouta	Islamic State of Iraq and the Levant (2013 – July 2014): Ansar al-Sharia (Allegedly, by al-Nusra)	Free Syrian Army (surrendered); Jaysh al-Islam (surrendered); Ahrar al-Sham (surrendered); Hay'at Tahrir al-Sham (surrendered); Jaysh al-Ummah (surrendered) (from 2014) (Syria) Syrian Government; Iran; Allied militias: Hezbollah; Palestinian Syrian militias LAAG; Arab Nationalist Guard; Liwa Fatemiyoun; Lions of Hussein	Defeat
Battle of Tell Abyad (2013)	Islamic State of Iraq and the Levant; Al-Nusra Front; Ahrar al-Sham: Al-Sakhana Brigades	(Syrian opposition) Kurdish Front: Sheikh Ayoub Battalion; (Democratic Autonomous Administration of North and East Syria) Democratic Union Party: People's Protection Units; Women's Protection Units	Victory
2013 Latakia offensive	Al-Qaeda; Islamic State of Iraq and the Levant; Al-Nusra Front; Free Syrian Army; Syrian Turkmen Brigades; Ahfad al-Rasul Brigades; Syrian Islamic Front; Ahrar ash-Sham; Ansar al-Sham; Junud al-Sham; Harakat Sham al-Islam	(Syria) Syrian Arab Republic	Defeat
Battle of al-Yaarubiyah	Al-Nusra Front; Islamic State of Iraq and the Levant: Ansar al-Khilafah Liwa al-Tawhid wal-Jihad Ahrar al-Sham Tawhid and Punishment Battalions and Brigades Kurdish Islamic Front Saladin al-Din Brigades Azadî Battalions	Kurdish Supreme Committee: Democratic Union Party (PYD); YPG; YPJ; Shammar tribe Non-combat support: Local Arab tribes; Iraq	Defeat
Battle of Sadad	Al-Nusra Front; Islamic State of Iraq and the Levant (Syria) Free Syrian Army	(Syria) Syrian Government; Syrian Social Nationalist Party	Defeat
Battle of Qalamoun	Al-Nusra Front; Islamic State of Iraq and the Levant; Green Battalion Free Syrian Army; Islamic Front	(Syria) Syrian Government; Allied militias: Hezbollah; Arab Nationalist Guard	Defeat
Akashat ambush	Islamic State of Iraq	(Syria) Syrian Arab Republic; Iraq	Victory
2013 Hawija clashes	Naqshbandi Army; Islamic State of Iraq and the Levant	(Iraq) Iraqi Government; Kurdistan Region	Indecisive
Operation al-Shabah	Islamic State of Iraq and the Levant; Al-Nusra Front	(Iraq) Iraqi Government: Iraqi Army; Iraqi Air Force; Iraqi Police	Indecisive
Aleppo offensive (October–December 2013)	Syrian Opposition; Free Syrian Army; Al-Nusra Front; Ahrar al-Sham; Nour al-Din al-Zenki Movement; Islamic State	(Syria) Syrian Government; Hezbollah	Defeat
Battle of Touayel	(Islamic State) ISIS	Tunisia	Defeat
Battle of Tell Hamis and Tell Brak (December 2013–January 2014)	Islamic State of Iraq and the Levant; Al-Nusra Front; Islamic Front: Ahrar al-Sham; Jaysh al-Islam; Free Syrian Army (pro-rebel claim)	Movement for a Democratic Society (TEV-DEM): Democratic Union Party (PYD); People's Protection Units (YPG); Women's Protection Units (YPJ); Syriac Union Party; Syriac Military Council (MFS)	Victory
Fall of Fallujah	Islamic State of Iraq and the Levant: Military of ISIL	Republic of Iraq: Iraqi Armed Forces; Iraqi Police	Victory
Anbar campaign (2013–14)	Islamic State of Iraq and the Levant Military Council of Anbar's Revolutionaries: Naqshbandi Army; General Military Council for Iraqi Revolutionaries; Anbar Tribal Council; Army of Pride and Dignity	Government of Iraq: Iraqi military; ISOF; Iraqi Police; Shia Muslim Militias; Awakening Councils; Pro-government tribes; Ba'athist Syria Supported by: Iran; United States	Victory
Siege of Kuweires Airbase (2012–15)	Islamic State	(Syria) Syrian Arab Republic: Syrian Armed Forces; National Defence Forces; Iran: IRGC; Quds Force; IRGC Ground Forces; Hezbollah; Ba'ath Brigades; Harakat Hezbollah al-Nujaba Air strikes: Russia: Aerospace Forces	Defeat
Northern Aleppo offensive (February–July 2014)	Islamic State	(Syrian opposition) Free Syrian Army: Northern Storm Brigade; Conquest Brigade; Free Syria Operations Room; Islamic Front; Al-Nusra Front	Defeat
Battle of Markada	Islamic State of Iraq and the Levant: al-Barakah Province; Katiba al-Bittar al-Libi	al-Nusra Front	Victory
Deir ez-Zor offensive (April–July 2014)	Islamic State	Free Syrian Army; Al-Nusra Front; Islamic Front; Army of Mujahedeen; Syrian Revolutionaries Front; Liwa al-Qadisiyah; Liwa 'Umar al-Mukhtar	Victory
Battle of Benghazi (2014)	Shura Council of Benghazi Revolutionaries; ISIL linked Factions: Youth Shura Council Derna; Ansar al sharia brigades; Jund al-Khilafah	(Libya) Libyan National Army	Victory
Qalamoun offensive (June–August 2014)	Islamic Front (Syrian opposition) Free Syrian Army Islamic State; Al-Nusra Front	Syria; Lebanon; Hezbollah	Inconclusive
Battle of Arsal	Al-Nusra Front; Islamic State	Lebanon; Hezbollah (Syria) Syrian Arab Republic	Defeat
First Battle of the Shaer gas field	Islamic State of Iraq and the Levant	(Syria) Syrian Arab Republic	Both sides claim victory
2014 Eastern Syria offensive	Islamic State of Iraq and the Levant	(Syria) Syrian Arab Republic: Syrian Army; Syrian Air Force; National Defence Forces; Rojava: People's Protection Units; Syriac Military Council (MFS)	Victory
Battle for Tabqa Air base	Islamic State	(Syria) Syrian Arab Republic	Victory
Northern Iraq offensive (June 2014)	Islamic State of Iraq and the Levant: Naqshbandi Army GMCIR	Republic of Iraq: Security forces; Iraqi Volunteer Forces; Shi'ite private militias; Mahdi Army; Syriac Military Council; Qaraqosh Protection Committee; Nineveh Plain Protection Units; Syria (limited involvement): Syrian Air Force; Iran Supported by: United States; Russia Kurdistan Region: Peshmerga; Kurdistan Workers' Party (PKK)	Victory
Fall of Mosul	Islamic State of Iraq and the Levant	Iraq	Victory
Fall of Baiji	Islamic State of Iraq and the Levant	Iraq	Victory
Siege of Amirli	Islamic State; Wilayah Salah-Al-Din	Iraq; Iraqi Army; Iraqi Turkmen Front; Iran; IRGC; Quds Force; Special Groups; Promised Day Brigades; Asa'ib Ahl al-Haq; Kata'ib Hezbollah; Badr Brigades; 16th Turkmen Brigade; Kurdistan Region; Peshmerga; Air support: United States; Iran; Aid support: United States; United Kingdom; France; Australia	Defeat
Battle of Al-Hasakah (June–September 2014)	ISIL	YPG; Syria	Defeat
Battle of Kirkuk (2014)	Islamic State of Iraq and the Levant	Kurdistan Region: Peshmerga; CJTF–OIR	Defeat
First Battle of Tikrit	Islamic State: Ansar al-Islam; Islamic Army in Iraq: Hamas of Iraq; Iraqi Ba'ath Party Loyalists: Naqshbandi Army; General Military Council for Iraqi Revolutionaries; Supreme Command for Jihad and Liberation	Iraq: Security forces; Shi'ite private militias; United States	Victory
Siege of Tikrit (July 2014)	ISIL	Iraq; Iran	Victory

Islamic State

Battle	Allies	Opponents	Outcome
2014 American rescue mission in Syria	Islamic State: Military of the Islamic State	United States; Jordan (unconfirmed)	Victory
Northern Iraq offensive (August 2014)	Islamic State	Republic of Iraq: Security forces; Shi'ite private militias; Promised Day Brigade; United States: U.S. Navy; U.S. Air Force; Kurdistan Region: Peshmerga; Assyrian Patriotic Party; Assyrian Democratic Movement; PKK: YJA-STAR; YRK; HPJ; YBŞ; Rojava: YPG; Syriac Military Council; YPJ; PDKI; Komalah	Victory
Siege of Amirli	Islamic State; Wilayah Salah-Al-Din	Iraq; Iraqi Army; Iraqi Turkmen Front; Iran; IRGC; Quds Force; Special Groups; Promised Day Brigades; Asa'ib Ahl al-Haq; Kata'ib Hezbollah; Badr Brigades; 16th Turkmen Brigade; Kurdistan Region; Peshmerga; Air support: United States; Iran; Aid support: United States; United Kingdom; France; Australia	Defeat
Siege of Deir ez-Zor (2014–2017)	Islamic State	(Syria) Syrian Government; Hezbollah; PMF-affiliated militias Russia (Sep 2015 – Nov 2017)	Defeat
Battle of Zumar	Islamic State	Kurdistan Region: Peshmerga; Air support: France	Defeat
American-led intervention in Iraq (2014–present)	Islamic State Of Iraq and The Levant; White Flags	Coalition of foreign countries: CJTF–OIR: United States; Australia; Belgium; Canada (2014–16); Denmark; France; Germany; Italy; Jordan; Morocco (2014–16); Netherlands; New Zealand; United Kingdom; Turkey (2014–17); Local forces: Iraq: Iraqi Armed Forces; ISOF; IrAF; Nineveh Plain Protection Units; Peshmerga	Defeat
Battle of Haditha (August 2014 – January 2015)	Islamic State	Iraq; United States; Canada; United Kingdom; Australia	Defeat
Battle of Sharfadin Temple	Islamic State	Kurdistan Region	Defeat
Battle for Haditha Dam (August–September 2014)	Islamic State: Military of the Islamic State	Iraq; Albu Nimr tribe United States	Defeat
Battle of Dabiq (August–September 2015)	Islamic State	(Syria) Syrian opposition	Victory
Battle of Hawija (August–September 2014)	Islamic State	United States; Canada; United Kingdom; Australia	Victory
Sinjar	Islamic State	Iraq; Kurdistan Region; Peshmerga; Kurdistan Workers' Party; People's Protection Units; Sinjar Resistance Units; Syriac Military Council; Supported by: United States; United Kingdom; Australia	Defeat
Battle of Sinjar (August 2014)	Islamic State	(Kurdistan Region) Peshmerga; United States; United Kingdom	Victory
Battle of Sinjar (August–October 2014)	Islamic State	(Kurdistan Region) Peshmerga; United States; United Kingdom	Victory
Battle for Mosul Dam	Islamic State	Iraq Kurdistan Region Airstrikes: United States	Defeat
Battle of Suq al Ghazi	Islamic State	United States; United Kingdom; France; Iraq	Defeat
Battle of Sawran (August 2014 – May 2015)	Islamic State	(Syria) Syrian opposition	Victory
Siege of Kobanî	Islamic State	Rojava; PKK; Kurdistan Region (from 30 October); Free Syrian Army; CJTF-OIR: United States; Jordan; United Arab Emirates; Saudi Arabia; Qatar	Defeat
Battle of Al-Hasakah (September–October 2014)	Islamic State	YPG; Syria; United States	Indecisive
Siege of Saqlawiyah	Islamic State	Iraq: Iraqi Army; Iraqi Air Force	Victory
American-led intervention in Syria	Islamic State al-Qaeda: al-Nusra Front (2014–2017); Khorasan group (2014–2017); Rouse the Believers Operations Room (2018–2020); Hurras al-Din (2018–2025); Jund al-Aqsa (2014–17); Turkistan Islamic Party (2014–2025)	CJTF–OIR; United States; Turkey (Syrian opposition) Free Syrian Army (2011–present) Supported by: United Kingdom; France; Former participants: Canada (2014–16); Bahrain (2014–16); Belgium (2014–17); Germany (2015–22); Saudi Arabia (2014–2018); United Arab Emirates (2014–2018); Qatar (2014–16); Morocco (2014–16); Australia (2014–17); Netherlands (2014–19); Denmark (2016–23); Italy (2018); Local ground forces Syrian Democratic Forces: YPG; YPJ; Syriac Military Council; Al-Sanadid Forces; Euphrates Volcano (2014–15); Ba'athist Syria (surrendered); Russia (until 8 December 2024); Hezbollah; Iran (until 6 December 2024); Supported by: Islamic Resistance in Iraq; Popular Mobilization Forces; Kata'ib Hezbollah (limited 2019 and 2021 strikes); Islamic Front (2013–2015); Syrian Salvation Government (2017–2024): Ahrar al-Sham (Nov. 2014–2025 airstrikes, intentionality disputed); Tahrir al-Sham (2017–2025); Jaysh al-Sunna (2015–2017)	Defeat
Second Siege of Mount Sinjar (October–December 2014)	Islamic State	(Kurdistan Region) Peshmerga; United States; United Kingdom	Defeat
Operation Ashura	Islamic State: Military of the Islamic State	Iraq: Iraqi Security Forces; Army; Air Force; Federal Police; Shia militias; Asa'ib Ahl al-Haq; Badr Brigades; Kata'ib Hezbollah; Kata'ib Jund al-Imam; Other unnamed groups; Iran: Quds Force; Hezbollah	Defeat
North Lebanon clashes (2014)	Islamic State	Lebanon: Lebanese Armed Forces; Internal Security Forces	Defeat
Fall of Hīt (2014)	Islamic State	Republic of Iraq; United States	Victory
Derna campaign (2014–16)	Islamic State of Iraq and the Levant	Libya; Egypt (airstrikes); United States (airstrikes) Shura Council of Mujahideen in Derna	Defeat
Battle of Benghazi (2014–2017)	Islamic State of Iraq and the Levant (from Nov. 2014 to Jan. 2017): Wilayat Barqa	(Libya) Libyan National Army: Benghazi Security Directorate; Supported by: France: DGSE; Special Forces; Shura Council of Benghazi Revolutionaries: (Libya) Benghazi Defense Brigades; Ansar al-Sharia; Libya Shield 1; Supported by: (Libya) LROR	Defeat
Baghdad offensive (October 2014 – January 2015)	Islamic State	Iraq; Iran; United States; United Kingdom; Canada; Australia	Defeat
October 2014 Sinai attacks	Islamic State	Egypt: Egyptian Army	Indecisive
2014 Idlib city raid	al-Nusra Front; Jund al-Aqsa; Islamic State (alleged) Supported by: Sleeper cells within the city	(Syria) Syrian Arab Republic: Syrian Armed Forces; National Defense Force	Defeat
Second Battle of the Shaer gas field	Islamic State	(Syria) Syrian Government	Defeat
Battle of Baiji (2014–2015)	Islamic State of Iraq and the Levant	Iraq Airstrikes: United States; United Kingdom; France; Canada	Defeat
Battle of Ramadi (2014–15)	Islamic State of Iraq and the Levant	Iraq Air support: United States; United Kingdom; Canada; Australia	Victory
Southern Syria offensive (November–December 2014)	Islamic State	Syria; Syrian opposition	Partial victory
Diyala offensive (December 2014 – March 2015)	Islamic State	Iraq; Iran; United States; United Kingdom	Defeat
Lindt Cafe siege	Islamic State lone wolf	Australia	Defeat
Siege of Haditha Dam (December 2014 – May 2015)	Islamic State	Iraq; United States; Canada; United Kingdom; Australia	Defeat
Battle of Kirkuk (December 2014)	Islamic State	(Kurdistan Region) Peshmerga; United States; Canada; United Kingdom; Australia	Defeat
Battle of Al-Hasakah (December 2014)	Islamic State	YPG; Syria; United States	Indecisive
Deir ez-Zor offensive (December 2014)	Islamic State	(Syria) Syrian Government; Al-Shaitat tribes	Indecisive
Siege of Deir ez-Zor (2014–17)	Islamic State	(Syria) Syrian Government; Hezbollah; PMF-affiliated militias Russia (Sep 2015 – Nov 2017)	Defeat
Battle of Tikrit (December 2014)	Islamic State	Iraq; Iran; United Kingdom; United States	Victory
Qalamoun clashes (December 2014)	Islamic State al-Nusra Front	Syria	Victory
North Lebanon clashes (December 2014 – May 2015)	Islamic State al-Nusra Front	Lebanon; Hezbollah	Partial victory
December 2014 Sinjar offensive	Islamic State of Iraq and the Levant	Iraqi Kurdistan: Peshmerga; PKK: HPG; YJA-Star; Rojava: People's Protection Units; Syriac Military Council; Women's Protection Units; YBŞ; MLKP Air support: United States; United Kingdom; Canada; Australia; Other Support: Germany	Defeat
Battle of Sinjar (December 2014 – November 2015)	Islamic State of Iraq and the Levant	Iraqi Kurdistan Sinjar Alliance; PKK; Rojava; Supported by: CJTF–OIR Air support: United Kingdom; Canada; United States; MedEvac support: Iraq	Defeat
Siege of Tikrit (December 2014–March 2015)	Islamic State	Iraq; Iran; United States	Indecisive
2015 West African offensive	(Islamic State) Boko Haram (until March 2015) (Islamic State) ISIL: (Islamic State) Wilayat Gharb Afriqiya (from March 2015)	Multinational Joint Task Force: Nigeria; Cameroon; Chad; Niger; Local militias STTEP (foreign mercenaries)	Defeat
Mosul offensive (2015)	Islamic State of Iraq and the Levant	Kurdistan Region: Peshmerga; CJTF-OIR (airstrikes) List: United States United Kingdom Canada Jordan Morocco	Defeat
Battle of Kirkuk (January–February 2015)	Islamic State of Iraq and the Levant	Kurdistan Region Airstrikes: CJTF-OIR	Defeat
January 2015 raid on Kolofata	Islamic State of Iraq and the Levant; Boko Haram	Cameroon	Defeat
January 2015 Sinai attacks	Islamic State of Iraq and the Levant: Wilayat Sinai (formerly known as Ansar Bait al-Maqdis)	Egypt: Egyptian Army	Initial Victory
2015 Niger raid	Islamic State	Niger; Chad	Defeat
Battle of Sirte (2015)	Islamic State of Iraq and the Levant: Wilayat Tarabulus	Libya Shield Force	Victory
Fall of Nofaliya (2015)	Islamic State of Iraq and the Levant: Wilayat Tripolitania	(Libya) New General National Congress	Victory
Battle of Sarrin (February 2015)	Islamic State	YPG (Syria) Free Syrian Army	Victory
Airstrikes in Libya	Islamic State	Egypt; Libya (House of Representatives)	Indecisive
Erbil offensive (February 2015)	Islamic State	(Kurdistan Region) Peshmerga; United States; Canada; United Kingdom; Australia	Defeat
Al-Hasakah offensive (February–March 2015)	Islamic State	Rojava; Syriac Union Party; Al-Sanadid Forces; International Freedom Battalion; Supported by: CJTF–OIR (Kurdistan Region) Iraqi Kurdistan (Syria) Syrian Arab Republic; Sootoro	Partial defeat
Khabur Valley offensive (February–May 2015)	Islamic State	Rojava; Syriac Union Party; Al-Sanadid Forces; Air-strikes: CJTF–OIR	Defeat
Battle of Samarra (February 2015)	Islamic State	Iraq; Iran; United States; United Kingdom	Defeat
Salahuddin campaign	Islamic State of Iraq and the Levant	Iraq; Kurdistan Region Iranian-led intervention: Iran; Hezbollah; Shia militias: Asa'ib Ahl al-Haq; Badr Organization; Kata'ib Hezbollah; Muqawimun U.S.-led intervention: United States; United Kingdom; Canada; France	Defeat
Battle of Ajdabiya (March 2015)	Islamic State	Libya	Defeat
Second Battle of Tikrit	Islamic State of Iraq and the Levant	Iraq; Iran; Airstrikes: United States (25–31 March only); United Kingdom (25–29 March only); France	Defeat
Kirkuk offensive (March 2015)	Islamic State	(Kurdistan Region) Peshmerga; Iraq; United States; Canada; United Kingdom; Australia	Defeat
Siege of Dahra Oil Field (March–April 2015)	Islamic State	(Libya) New General National Congress	Defeat
Battle of Nofaliya (March 2015)	Islamic State	(Libya) New General National Congress	Defeat
Battle of Sarrin (March–April 2015)	Islamic State	Autonomous Administration of North and East Syria: YPG; YPJ; Free Syrian Army Supported by: CJTF–OIR (Kurdistan Region) Peshmerga	Indecisive
Hama and Homs offensive (March–April 2015)	Islamic State of Iraq and the Levant: Military of ISIL	(Syria) Syrian Arab Republic: Syrian Armed Forces; National Defense Force	Partial Victory
Battle of Ajdabiya (March 2015 – February 2016)	Islamic State	Libya	Defeat
Battle of Ras al-Hilal (March–April 2015)	Islamic State	Libya	Victory
Battle of Bin Jawad (April 2015)	Islamic State	Libya; New General National Congress	Defeat
Battle of Nofaliya (April 2015)	Islamic State	(Libya) New General National Congress	Victory
Battle of Yarmouk Camp (April 2015)	Islamic State of Iraq and the Levant al-Nusra Front	Jaysh al-Islam; Free Syrian Army; Aknaf Bait al-Maqdis (surrendered) (Syria) Syrian Arab Republic: Armed Forces; Palestine Liberation Army; PFLP-GC; Fatah al-Intifada; PPSF	Partial victory
Anbar campaign (2015–16)	Islamic State of Iraq and the Levant	Iraq: Iraqi security forces; Armed Forces; Federal Police; Local Sunni tribes; Shia militias (not directly involved); Support: United States; Air support: United States; United Kingdom; Australia; France; Canada	Defeat
Battle of Lamluda (April–June 2015)	Islamic State	Libya	Defeat
Hama and Homs offensive (April 2015)	Islamic State	Syria	Indecisive
Sambisa Forest offensive (March–May 2015)	Islamic State	Nigeria	Indecisive
Qalamoun clashes (April–May 2015)	Islamic State al-Nusra Front	Syria; Syrian opposition	Indecisive
Al-Karmah offensive (2015)	Islamic State of Iraq and the Levant	Iraq; United States; Air support: United Kingdom; Canada	Indecisive
Battle of Al-Karmah (April 2015 – May 2016)	Islamic State	Iraq	Defeat
Siege of Kabisa (April–May 2015)	Islamic State	Iraq	Victory
Battle of Harawa (April–May 2015)	Islamic State	(Libya) Local Libyan militias (Libya) New General National Congress	Victory
Fall of Marte (April 2015)	Islamic State	Nigeria	Victory
Battle of Al-Hasakah (April 2015)	Islamic State	Syria	Defeat
Quneitra offensive (April–May 2015)	Army of Conquest Qalamoun; Al-Nusra Front; Islamic Front; Free Syrian Army; Islamic State (limited cooperation with al-Nusra Front until 12 May; in conflict since 12 May)	(Syria) Syrian Arab Republic; Hezbollah; Amal Movement	Defeat
Southwest Daraa offensive (April–May 2015)	Islamic State	(Syria) Syrian opposition al-Nusra Front	Victory
Qalamoun offensive (May–June 2015)	Islamic State al-Nusra Front	Syria; Hezbollah; Syrian opposition	Defeat
North Lebanon offensive (May 2015–present)	Islamic State al-Nusra Front	Lebanon; Hezbollah	Defeat
Al-Hasakah attack (6 May 2015)	Islamic State	YPG	Defeat
Palmyra offensive (May 2015)	Islamic State	(Syria) Syrian Arab Republic: Syrian Arab Armed Forces	Victory
May 2015 American Deir ez-Zor capture mission	Islamic State	United States	Defeat
Southern Syria offensive (May 2015)	Islamic State	Syria; Syrian opposition	Victory
Battle of Yarmouk Camp (May–June 2015)	Islamic State al-Nusra Front	Syria; Syrian opposition	Defeat
Northern Aleppo offensive (May–November 2015)	Islamic State	Syrian opposition YPG (Only in May 2015) al-Nusra Front (Until August 2015); United States; Syria (Only in May 2015 and October 2015)	Partial victory
Siege of Kabisa (May 2015 – March 2016)	Islamic State	Iraq; United States	Defeat
Battle of Ras al-Hilal (May–June 2015)	Islamic State	Libya	Defeat
Siege of Haditha (May–June 2015)	Islamic State	Iraq; United States; United Kingdom; Canada	Defeat
Al-Hasakah city offensive (May–June 2015)	Islamic State	(Syria) Syrian Arab Republic Syrian Kurdistan; Syriac Union Party; Supported by: CJTF–OIR	Defeat
Tell Abyad offensive (2015)	Islamic State	Rojava; YPG; Free Syrian Army; Supported by: CJTF–OIR	Defeat
Battle of Sarrin (June–July 2015)	Islamic State	Autonomous Administration of North and East Syria; YPG; YPJ; Free Syrian Army; Airstrikes: CJTF–OIR	Defeat
Kobanî massacre	Islamic State	Autonomous Administration of North and East Syria; YPG; YPJ; Supported by: CJTF–OIR	Defeat
Battle of Al-Hasakah (June–August 2015)	Islamic State	Syrian Kurdistan Syriac Union Party; Airstrikes: CJTF–OIR (Syria) Syrian Arab Republic: Syrian Armed Forces; Syrian Arab Air Force; Syrian Republican Guard	Defeat
Al-Hasakah offensive (June–July 2015)	Islamic State	Syria; YPG; United States	Defeat
Battle of Tell Brak (June 2015)	Islamic State	YPG; United States	Defeat
Battle of Sheikh Zuweid	Islamic State of Iraq and the Levant: Wilayat Sinai (formerly known as Ansar Bait al-Maqdis)	Egypt: Egyptian Army; Central Security Forces; Egyptian Ministry of the Interior	Defeat
Palmyra offensive (July – August 2015)	Islamic State: Wilayat Homs	(Syria) Syrian Arab Republic: Syrian Armed Forces; National Defense Force; Syrian Arab Air Force; Hezbollah; Lions of Hussein Brigade	Indecisive
Battle of Ramadi (July 2015 – February 2016)	Islamic State of Iraq and the Levant	Iraq: Iraqi security forces; Armed Forces; Federal Police; Local Sunni tribes; Shia militias (not directly involved in the city proper); Air support: United States; United Kingdom; Australia; France; Canada	Defeat
Tiyas offensive (July–August 2015)	Islamic State	Syria	Defeat
Battle of Tell Al-Sim'an (July–August 2015)	Islamic State	YPG; United States	Victory
Diyala insurgency (July–December 2015)	Islamic State	Iraq; Iran	Defeat
Battle of al-Qaryatayn (August 2015)	Islamic State	Syria	Victory
Battle of Sirte (August 2015)	Islamic State	(Libya) Local Libyan militias (Libya) New General National Congress	Victory
Siege of Mare' (August–September 2015)	Islamic State	(Syria) Syrian opposition United States	Defeat
Al-Hawl offensive (August–November 2015)	Islamic State	Syrian Democratic Forces International Freedom Battalion; Sinjar Resistance Units; Airstrikes: CJTF–OIR	Defeat
Sambisa Forest offensive (August 2015–present)	Islamic State	Nigeria; Chad (Since March 2016); United States	Defeat
Battle of Marte (August–September 2015)	Islamic State	Nigeria	Defeat
Kirkuk offensive (August–October 2015)	Islamic State	(Kurdistan Region) Peshmerga; Iraq; United States	Defeat
Operation Martyr's Right	Islamic State: Wilayat Sinai	Egypt: Egyptian Armed Forces; Egyptian National Police	Defeat
Jarabulus offensive (September–November 2015)	Islamic State	YPG (Syria) Free Syrian Army; United States (Only in September 2015)	Indecisive
Mount Abdulaziz offensive (September–October 2015)	Islamic State	YPG (Syria) Free Syrian Army; United States	Defeat
Operation Tidal Wave II	Islamic State	United States: Combined Joint Task Force	Defeat
October 2015 al-Omar Oil Field Raid	Islamic State	United States	Defeat
October 2015 Hawija rescue mission	Islamic State	United States (Kurdistan Region) Peshmerga	Defeat
Al-Safira offensive (October 2015)	Islamic State	Syria; Iran; Russia	Defeat
Kuweires offensive (September–November 2015)	Islamic State	(Syria) Syrian Arab Republic: Syrian Armed Forces; National Defence Forces; Iran: IRGC; Quds Force; IRGC Ground Forces; Hezbollah; Ba'ath Brigades; Harakat Hezbollah al-Nujaba Air strikes: Russia: Aerospace Forces	Defeat
Khanasir–Ithriya Highway offensive (October–November 2015)	Islamic State	Syria; Iran; Russia	Defeat
Battle of Samarra (October 2015)	Islamic State	Iraq; United States	Defeat
Fall of Mahin (October 2015)	Islamic State	Syria; Russia	Victory
Battle of Sadad (November 2015)	Islamic State	Syria; Russia	Defeat
East Aleppo offensive (2015–16)	Islamic State	(Syria) Syrian Arab Republic; Iran; Hezbollah Air strikes: Russia: Aerospace Forces	Defeat
Tikrit offensive (November 2015)	Islamic State	Iraq; United States	Defeat
Baiji offensive (November 2015)	Islamic State	Iraq; United States	Defeat
November 2015 Al-Tanf Raid	Islamic State	(Syria) New Syrian Army; United States	Defeat
Battle of Mahin (November 2015)	Islamic State	Syria; Russia	Defeat
Siege of al-Qaryatayn (November–December 2015)	Islamic State	Syria; Russia	Victory
Northern Aleppo offensive (December 2015)	Islamic State	(Syria) Syrian opposition United States	Indecisive
Homs offensive (November–December 2015)	Islamic State	Syria: Syrian Army; Syrian Air Force; National Defence Forces Iran; Hezbollah; Christian militias: SSNP; Sootoro; Guardians of the Dawn Air strikes: Russia: Aerospace Forces	Victory
Samarra offensive (December 2015 – March 2016)	Islamic State	Iraq; Iran	Defeat
Nineveh Plains offensive (December 2015)	Islamic State	Kurdistan Region; Canada; Air support: France; United Kingdom; United States	Defeat
Tishrin Dam offensive (December 2015)	Islamic State	Syrian Democratic Forces International Freedom Battalion; Air support: CJTF–OIR	Defeat
26 December 2015 Hawija raid	Islamic State	United States (Kurdistan Region) Peshmerga	Defeat
30 December 2015 Hawija raid	Islamic State	United States; Iraq (Kurdistan Region) Peshmerga	Defeat
Ayn Issa offensive (December 2015)	Islamic State	Syrian Democratic Forces; United States	Defeat
2 January 2016 Hawija raid	Islamic State	United States (Kurdistan Region) Peshmerga	Defeat
January 2016 Qayyarah raid	Islamic State	United States	Defeat
Siege of Haditha (January 2016)	Islamic State	United States; United Kingdom; Iraq	Defeat
Deir ez-Zor offensive (January 2016)	Islamic State	(Syria) Syrian Arab Republic: Syrian Army; Syrian Air Force; National Defence Forces; Shaitat tribe; (Russia) Russian Armed Forces: Russian Air Force	Victory
Al-Naseriyah offensive (January–March 2016)	Islamic State of Iraq and the Levant	Syria; Russia; Iran; Syrian opposition	Defeat
Siege of Fallujah (2016)	Islamic State of Iraq and the Levant	Iraq: Iraqi security forces; Armed Forces; Federal Police; Shi'ite militias; Local Sunni tribes; Iran: Quds Force; Air support: United States; United Kingdom; France; Australia	Defeat
Ithriyah-Raqqa offensive (February–March 2016)	Islamic State of Iraq and the Levant	(Syria) Syrian Arab Republic: Syrian Armed Forces	Indecisive
Nangarhar Offensive (2016)	Islamic State: Islamic State – Khorasan Province	Afghanistan: Afghan National Security Forces; Local militias; Supported by: RS: United States	Defeat
Abu Kamal revolt (February–March 2016)	Islamic State	Syria; Russia	Victory
February 2016 Kisik and Badush raid	Islamic State	United States	Defeat
Al-Shaddadi offensive (2016)	Islamic State	Syrian Democratic Forces; International Freedom Battalion; Airstrikes: CJTF–OIR	Defeat
Battle of Sabratha (February 2016)	Islamic State	Libya; New General National Congress	Defeat
Southern Syria offensive (February–March 2016)	Islamic State	Syria; Free Syrian Army; United States; Jordan	Defeat
2016 Butig clashes	Islamic State of Iraq and the Levant: Maute group	Philippines	Defeat
2016 Khanasir offensive	Islamic State; Jund al-Aqsa Supported by: Free Syrian Army	(Syria) Syrian Arab Republic: Syrian Army; Syrian Air Force; National Defence Forces; al-Quds Brigades; Ba'ath Brigades; Hezbollah; Russia: Aerospace Forces	Defeat
Battle of Tell Abyad (2016) (February 2016)	Islamic State	Syrian Democratic Forces (SDF) Airstrikes: CJTF–OIR	Defeat
Abu Ghraib and Western Baghdad attack (February 2016)	Islamic State	Iraq; Iran	Defeat
Irbid raid (March 2016)	Islamic State	Jordan	Defeat
Northeastern Syria offensive (March 2016)	Islamic State	Syrian Democratic Forces; United States	Defeat
Al-Tanf offensive (2016)	ISIL	(Syrian opposition) Free Syrian Army Supported by: CJTF–OIR: United States; CIA; Jordan	Defeat
Hīt offensive (2016)	Islamic State of Iraq and the Levant	Iraq: Iraqi security forces; Armed Forces; Federal Police; Local Sunni tribes; Shi'ite militias; Air support: United States; United Kingdom; Australia	Defeat
Ar-Rutbah takeover (March 2016)	Islamic State (Temporary withdrawal)	Iraq	Victory
Battle of Inkhil (March 2016)	Islamic State	(Syria) Free Syrian Army	Defeat
Daraa offensive (March–April 2016)	Islamic State	Free Syrian Army; Alwiya al-Furqan al-Nusra Front al-Murabitin Brigade (since 28 March)	Defeat
Siege of al-Qaryatayn (March–April 2016)	Islamic State of Iraq and the Levant	(Syria) Syrian Arab Republic; Syrian Social Nationalist Party; Al-Jabalawi Battalion; Russia	Defeat
Battle of Ben Guerdane (March 2016)	Islamic State of Iraq and the Levant in Libya; Ansar al-Sharia (Tunisia)	Tunisia: Tunisian Army; Tunisian National Guard; (Tunisia) Police Force and Customs Officials	Defeat
Palmyra offensive (March 2016)	Islamic State	(Syria) Syrian Arab Republic: Syrian Arab Army; Russia; Iran; Allied militias: Hezbollah; Iraqi Shi'ite militias: Liwaa Imam Al-'Ali; Kata'ib Hezbollah; Harakat Hezbollah al-Nujaba; Badr Brigades; Liwa Fatemiyoun (Syria) Liwa Sayf al-Mahdi; Ba'ath Brigades; Galilee Forces	Defeat
Battle of Tell Al-Sim'an (March 2016)	Islamic State	Syrian Democratic Forces; United States	Defeat
Battle of Mosul (2016–2017)	Islamic State	Iraq: ISOF; Popular Mobilisation Forces; Kata'ib al-Imam Ali; (Assyrian homeland) Nineveh Plain Protection Units; Kurdistan Region: Peshmerga; CJTF–OIR: United States; France; United Kingdom; Canada; Australia; Germany; Turkey; Netherlands; Supported by: Pakistan (intelligence sharing by ISI); Hezbollah; Iran	Defeat
Northern Aleppo offensive (March–June 2016)	Islamic State of Iraq and the Levant	(Syrian opposition) Free Syrian Army: Hawar Kilis Operations Room; Mare' Operations Room; Army of Conquest; CJTF-OIR: Turkey; United States	Defeat
Sayqal offensive (April 2016)	Islamic State	Syria; Free Syrian Army; Russia	Defeat
Battle of Bashir (April–May 2016)	Islamic State	Iraq; Iran (Kurdistan Region) Peshmerga; United States	Defeat
Mosul raid (April 2016)	Islamic State	United States (Kurdistan Region) Peshmerga	Defeat
Khorsabad offensive (April 2016)	Islamic State	(Kurdistan Region) Peshmerga; United States	Partial defeat
Sirte offensive (2016)	Islamic State of Iraq and the Levant: Wilayat Tarabulus	(Libya) Government of National Accord: Libyan Army; Misrata Brigades; Misrata Military Council; Petroleum Facilities Guard; Libyan Navy; United States (since 1 August 2016): U.S. Air Force; U.S. Navy; U.S. Marine Corps; United Kingdom: United Kingdom Special Forces; Royal Air Force; Royal Navy; France: French Special Forces; French Air Force; French Navy; Italy: Special Forces	Defeat
Ar-Rutbah offensive (2016)	Islamic State of Iraq and the Levant	Iraq: Iraqi security forces; Armed Forces; Federal Police; Local Sunni tribes; Popular Mobilization Forces; Air support CJTF-OIR	Defeat
Battle of Balad (May 2016)	Islamic State	Iraq; United States	Defeat
Battle of Al-Walid (May 2016)	Islamic State	(Syria) New Syrian Army; United States; Jordan	Defeat
Battle of Taji (May 2016)	Islamic State	Iraq	Defeat
Battle of Al-Doulab (May 2016)	Islamic State	Iraq; United States	Defeat
Northern Raqqa offensive (May 2016)	Islamic State	Syrian Democratic Forces; CJTF–OIR	Indecisive
Manbij offensive (2016)	Islamic State	Syrian Democratic Forces International Freedom Battalion; YBŞ; YJÊ; Supported by: CJTF–OIR: United States; United Kingdom (alleged); France; Germany (denied by Germany)	Defeat
Northern Aleppo offensive (March–June 2016)	Islamic State of Iraq and the Levant	(Syrian opposition) Free Syrian Army: Hawar Kilis Operations Room; Mare' Operations Room; Army of Conquest; CJTF-OIR: Turkey; United States	Defeat
Ithriyah-Raqqa offensive (June 2016)	Islamic State of Iraq and the Levant	(Syria) Syrian Arab Republic: Syrian Armed Forces; National Defense Force; SSNP; Ba'ath Brigades; Quwat al-Jalil; Arab Nationalist Guard; Russia: Aerospace Forces	Victory
Bir Qassab offensive (June 2016)	Islamic State	Free Syrian Army; Syria; United States; Jordan	Defeat
Battle of Arak (June 2016)	Islamic State	Syria; Russia	Defeat
Southwest Daraa offensive (June 2016)	Islamic State	(Syria) Syrian opposition	Indecisive
Southern Abu Kamal raid (June 2016)	Islamic State	(Syria) New Syrian Army; United States; United Kingdom; Jordan	Defeat
Al-Shirqat offensive (June–September 2016)	Islamic State	Iraq; United States; United Kingdom	Defeat
Al-Ra'i offensive (June–July 2016)	Islamic State	Syrian Opposition; United States; Turkey (artillery support & raids)	Victory
2016 Abu Kamal offensive	Islamic State: Wilayat al-Furat	(Syrian opposition) Free Syrian Army Supported by: CJTF–OIR: United States; CIA; Jordan	Indecisive
Al-Qa'im offensive (June 2016)	Islamic State	(Iraq) Iraqi tribal forces United States	Victory
Battle of Al-Doulab (July 2016)	Islamic State	Iraq; United States	Defeat
Battle of al-Rai (August 2016)	Islamic State	Free Syrian Army; Harakat Nour al-Din al-Zenki; Sham Legion; Supported by: Turkey	Defeat
Eastern Qalamoun offensive (September–October 2016)	Islamic State of Iraq and the Levant	Syrian Opposition; (Syria) Syrian Government	Defeat
Northern al-Bab offensive (September 2016)	Islamic State	Turkey (Syrian opposition) Syrian Opposition: Free Syrian Army Support: United States	Defeat
2016 Dabiq offensive	Islamic State	Turkey (Syrian opposition) Syrian rebels Support: United States	Defeat
Western al-Bab offensive (October–November 2016)	Islamic State	Syrian Democratic Forces: Al-Bab Military Council; (Syria) Syrian Arab Republic: Syrian Armed Forces (since 29 October); Support: Russia Turkey (Syrian opposition) Syrian National Army	Defeat
Qandala campaign	Islamic State: Islamic State in Somalia	Puntland	Indecisive
Battle of al-Bab	Islamic State	Turkey (Syrian opposition) Syrian National Army; Support: Russia (against ISIL only; since 29 December 2016); United States (against ISIL only, since 17 January 2017): Syrian Democratic Forces (until 27 November 2016); Al-Bab Military Council; Manbij Military Council; (Syria) Syrian Arab Republic; Syrian Armed Forces; Hezbollah; Syrian National Resistance; Syrian Resistance; Support: Russia (against ISIL only)	Defeat
Raqqa campaign (2016–2017)	Islamic State	Syrian Democratic Forces; Self Defence Forces (HXP); Leftist/anarchist volunteers CJTF–OIR: United States; France; United Kingdom; Germany; Iraqi Kurdistan Co-belligerents (Syria) Syrian Arab Republic; Russia	Defeat
Palmyra offensive (December 2016)	Islamic State	Syria Russia; Iran; Allied militias: Liwa Fatemiyoun; Liwa Zainebiyoun; Kata'ib al-Imam Ali; Hezbollah CJTF–OIR	Victory
Syrian Desert campaign (December 2016 – April 2017)	Islamic State	Syrian Opposition; Supported by: CJTF–OIR; Jordan; United States	Defeat
Palmyra offensive (2017)	Islamic State	Syria Russia; Allied militias: Hezbollah; Liwa Zainebiyoun CJTF–OIR	Defeat
Deir ez-Zor offensive (January 2017)	Islamic State of Iraq and the Levant	(Syria) Syrian Arab Republic; Russia	Victory
Dayr Hafir offensive (2017)	Islamic State	Syrian Arab Republic; Russia; Hezbollah Autonomous Administration of North and East Syria (27 Feb. – 6 Mar.); Support: United States (against ISIL only): (Syrian opposition) Hawar Kilis Operations Room (26 Feb. – 6 Mar.); (Syrian opposition) Free Syrian Army; Sham Legion; Ahrar al-Sham (26 Feb. – 6 Mar.); Turkey (1–6 Mar.)	Defeat
ISIL Daraa offensive (February 2017)	Islamic State	Southern Front; Hay'at Tahrir al-Sham	Victory
Eastern Homs offensive (2017)	Islamic State of Iraq and the Levant	(Syria) Syrian Arab Republic; Russia; Allied militias: Hezbollah	Defeat
Battle of Tabqa (2017)	Islamic State	Syrian Democratic Forces; Asayish; International Freedom Battalion CJTF–OIR: United States; United Kingdom; France; Iraqi Kurdistan	Defeat
Battle of Darzab (2017)	Islamic State: Khorasan Province	Taliban Afghanistan	Victory
2017 Bohol clashes	Islamic State of Iraq and the Levant: Abu Sayyaf; Maute group; Ansar Khalifa Philippines	Philippines: Armed Forces of the Philippines; Philippine National Police	Defeat
Western Nineveh offensive (2017)	Islamic State (IS)	Iraq; Limited air support: CJTF–OIR: United States	Defeat
Southern Syrian Desert offensive (May-July 2017)	Islamic State	Free Syrian Army; Syria; Russia; Hezbollah	Defeat
Maskanah Plains offensive	Islamic State of Iraq and the Levant	(Syria) Syrian Arab Republic; Syrian Armed Forces; Russia; Aerospace Forces	Defeat
Siege of Marawi	Islamic State	Philippines	Defeat
East Hama offensive (2017)	Islamic State of Iraq and the Levant	(Syria) Syrian Arab Republic Russia; Allied militias: Liwa al-Quds; Hezbollah	Defeat
Battle of Raqqa (2017)	Islamic State	AANES; Syrian Democratic Forces; People's Defense Units; Antifascist International Tabur; Self Defence Forces (HXP); International Freedom Battalion; Sinjar Resistance Units; Êzîdxan Women's Units; CJTF–OIR: United States; France; United Kingdom; Germany	Defeat
Battle of Tora Bora (2017)	(Islamic State) ISIL-K; Supported by: Pakistan (Nangarhar NDS claim)	Taliban Islamic Republic of Afghanistan; Supported by: RS: United States	Defeat
Southern Raqqa offensive (June 2017)	Islamic State	(Syria) Syrian Government; Russia	Defeat
Syrian Desert campaign (May–July 2017)	Islamic State of Iraq and the Levant (since 23 May)	(Syria) Syrian Arab Republic: Syrian Armed Forces; Pro-gov. militias; Russia; Iran; Allied militias: PMF-affiliated militias Hezbollah; Liwa Fatemiyoun; Supported by: UAE; Egypt (Syrian opposition) Free Syrian Army; Supported by: United States; Jordan; United Kingdom; France; Norway	Defeat
Central Syria campaign (July–October 2017)	Islamic State: Liwa al-Aqsa	(Syria) Syrian Arab Republic; Russia; Iran; Allied militias: Hezbollah; PMF-affiliated militias Syrian Resistance; Liwa Fatemiyoun; Al-Quds Brigade (Palestine) Galilee Forces (Syria) Brigades of the Den	Defeat
Qalamoun offensive (July–August 2017)	Islamic State (surrendered)	Hezbollah (Syria) Syrian Arab Republic; Iran (Lebanon) Lebanon; Support: United States Hay'at Tahrir al-Sham (surrendered); Free Syrian Army (surrendered)	Defeat
North Homs-Southern Hama pocket (August–September 2017)	Islamic State	Syria	Defeat
Tal Afar offensive (2017)	Islamic State	Iraq; Supported by: CJTF–OIR; Iraqi Kurdistan	Defeat
Battle of al-Qaryatayn (2017)	Islamic State	Syria	Defeat
Central Syria counter-offensive	Islamic State	Syria	Defeat
Western Anbar offensive (September 2017)	Islamic State	(Iraq) Iraq; Supported by: CJTF–OIR	Defeat
Battle of Deir ez-Zor (September–November 2017)	Islamic State of Iraq and the Levant (surrendered)	(Syria) Syrian Government; Russia; Iran; Allied militias: Liwa Fatemiyoun; Fatah al-Intifada; Galilee Forces; Free Palestine Movement	Defeat
Eastern Syria campaign (September–December 2017)	Islamic State	(Syria) Syrian Arab Republic: Syrian Armed Forces; Russia; Iran; Allied militias: Hezbollah; PMF militias Liwa Fatemiyoun	Defeat
Western Anbar offensive (2017) (September 2017)	Islamic State	(Iraq) Iraq; Supported by: CJTF–OIR	Defeat
Hawija offensive (2017)	Islamic State	Iraq; Supported by: Iran; CJTF–OIR: United States	Defeat
Deir ez-Zor campaign (2017–2019)	Islamic State; Wilayat al-Sham; al-Barakah district; Al-Khayr district; Al-Furat district	Syrian Democratic Forces; Federal Security Forces; International Freedom Battalion; CJTF–OIR; United States; United Kingdom; France; Netherlands; Russia; Iraq (2018)	Defeat
2017 Euphrates Crossing offensive	Islamic State of Iraq and the Levant	(Syria) Syrian Arab Republic; Russia	Defeat
2017 Mayadin offensive	Islamic State	(Syria) Syrian Arab Republic: Syrian Armed Forces; Russia	Defeat
Tongo Tongo ambush	Islamic State	Niger; United States; France	IS victory
Northeastern Hama offensive (2017)	Islamic State of Iraq and the Levant	Syrian Opposition; Syrian Salvation Government; Turkistan Islamic Party in Syria; Ajnad al-Kavkaz; Katibat al-Ghuraba al-Turkistan; Junud al-Sham; Katiba Abd Ar-Rahman; Imarat Kavkaz; Abu Amara Special Task Battalion; Ahrar al-Sham; Nour al-Din al-Zenki Movement; Jaysh al-Ahrar; Sham Legion (from 30 Oct.); (Syrian opposition) Free Syrian Army (from 31 Oct.); (Syria) Syrian Arab Republic (from 22 Oct.): Syrian Arab Armed Forces; Hezbollah; Russia (from 22 Oct.); Iran; Liwa al-Quds	Defeat
2017 Abu Kamal offensive	Islamic State	(Syria) Syrian Arab Republic: Syrian Arab Armed Forces; Russia: Russian Aerospace Forces; Iran: IRGC; Allied militias: Hezbollah; PMF militias Liwa Fatemiyoun; Liwa al-Quds	Defeat
Western Iraq campaign (2017)	Islamic State	Iraq	Defeat
Syrian Desert campaign (December 2017–December 2024)	Islamic State	Syria	Defeat
Southern Damascus offensive (January–February 2018)	Islamic State of Iraq and the Levant	Tahrir al-Sham; Jaysh al-Islam; Ajnad al-Sham Islamic Union; Free Syrian Army	Victory
Southern Damascus offensive (March 2018)	Islamic State of Iraq and the Levant	(Syria) Syrian Arab Republic: Syrian Armed Forces; Palestinian People's Party; Free Palestine Movement (Syrian opposition) Free Syrian Army (12 March only); Hay'at Tahrir al-Sham (12 March only)	Victory
Daraa offensive (2018)	Islamic State	(Syria) Syrian Opposition	Indecisive
Eastern Syria campaign (March–June 2018)	Islamic State	Syria; Russia	Defeat
3rd Southern Damascus Offensive	Islamic State (surrendered); Wilayat Dimashq; Hay'at Tahrir al-Sham (surrendered); Jaysh al-Islam (surrendered); Aknaf Bait al-Maqdis (remnants) (surrendered)	(Syria) Syrian Arab Republic; Palestinian Syrian militias Hezbollah; Arab Nationalist Guard; Russia	Defeat
Northeastern Syria offensive (2018)	Islamic State	Syrian Democratic Forces; United States	Defeat
Battle of Derna (2018)	Shura Council of Mujahideen in Derna (until 11 May); Derna Protection Force (since 11 May); Al-Qaeda: Al-Mourabitoun; Islamic State (limited involvement)	House of Representatives; SLM/A-Minnawi; Supported by: United Arab Emirates; France (allegedly); Egypt	Defeat
Deir ez-Zor offensive (2018)	Islamic State	(Syria) Syrian Arab Republic; Russia; Iran; Hezbollah; Iraq	Defeat
As-Suwayda offensive (June 2018)	Islamic State	(Syria) Syrian Arab Republic: Syrian Armed Forces; Hezbollah; SSNP; Mountain Brigade	Indecisive
2018 Southern Syria offensive	Islamic State (since 10 July)	(Syria) Syrian Government; Russia (since 24 June); Iran; Allied militias: Palestine Liberation Army; Liwa al-Quds; Iraqi Shiite militias Hezbollah (rebel claim); Liwa Abu al-Fadhal al-Abbas; Liwa Fatemiyoun; Ba'ath Brigades; As-Sa'iqa; SSNP; Druze militias: Syrian Opposition (surrendered); Southern Front (surrendered); Army of Free Tribes (surrendered); Syrian Salvation Government (surrendered); Syrian Liberation Front (surrendered); Jaysh al-Islam (surrendered); Alwiya al-Furqan (surrendered)	Defeat
Battle of Darzab (2018)	Islamic State: Khorasan Province; Islamic Republic of Afghanistan (airstrikes on the Taliban, 30–31 July)	Taliban	Defeat
As-Suwayda offensive (August–November 2018)	Islamic State	(Syria) Syrian Government; Russia (since 5 October); Hezbollah; SSNP; Palestine Liberation Army; Mountain Brigade	Defeat
Chad Basin campaign (2018–2020)	Islamic State: West Africa Province (ISWAP); Boko Haram	Multinational Joint Task Force (MJTF): Nigeria; Niger; Cameroon; Chad; Self-defense militias	Partial Defeat
Battle of Baghuz Fawqani (February–March 2019)	Islamic State: Wilāyat ash-Shām; al-Barakah district	Syrian Democratic Forces; International Freedom Battalion; CJTF–OIR: United States; France; United Kingdom; Iraq (minor cross-border support) (Syria) Syrian Arab Republic (minor defensive skirmishes)	Defeat
Kunar offensive (May 2019 – March 2020)	Islamic State: Khorasan Province	Taliban Afghanistan; United States	Defeat
Barisha raid (October 2019)	Islamic State	United States	Defeat
Battle of Inates (December 2019)	Islamic State in the Greater Sahara	Niger	Victory
Battle of Chinagodrar (January 2020)	Islamic State in the Greater Sahara	Niger; France; United States	Victory
March 2020 Chad and Nigeria massacres (March 2020)	Islamic State	Nigeria; Chad	Victory
Battle of Bir Al-Abd (July-August 2020)	Islamic State	Egypt	Initial Victory
Mocímboa da Praia offensive (August 2020)	Islamic State	Mozambique	Victory
2020 Al Bayda offensive (August 2020)	al-Qaeda: al-Qaeda in the Arabian Peninsula; Islamic State: Yemen Province	Supreme Political Council: Houthi movement; Cabinet of Yemen: Security Forces (pro-Hadi)	Defeat
Battle of Tessit (March 2021)	Islamic State in the Greater Sahara	Mali; France	Victory
Battle of Palma (March 2021)	Islamic State (IS); Non-IS rebels	Mozambique	Indecisive
Battle of Sambisa Forest (May 2021)	Islamic State: West Africa Province (ISWAP)	Boko Haram	Victory
2021 Cabo Delgado offensives (from July 2021)	Islamic State	Mozambique; Rwanda; SADC: Tanzania; South Africa; Botswana; Lesotho	Defeat (first offensive)
Battle of al-Hasakah (January 2022)	Islamic State	Rojava: YPG; Asayish; SDF; CJTF–OIR: United States; United Kingdom	SDF tactical victory/minor Islamic State strategic victory
Ménaka offensive (March 2022-May 2023)	Islamic State in the Greater Sahara	Platform: Movement for the Salvation of Azawad; Imghad Tuareg Self-Defense Group and Allies; Mali; Takuba Task Force (until June 2022): France; Czech Republic; Wagner Group (from June 2022): Niger (from March 2023); Jama'at Nasr al-Islam wal Muslimin	Victory
Battle of Andéramboukane (June 2022)	Islamic State: Sahel Province	GATIA; MSA; Mali	Victory
2022 Tessit attack (August 2022)	Islamic State in the Greater Sahara	Mali	Victory
Battle of Talataye (September 2022)	Islamic State: Sahel Province	Movement for the Salvation of Azawad Jama'at Nasr al-Islam wal Muslimin	Victory
December 2022 Ménaka region clashes	Islamic State in the Greater Sahara	Jama'at Nasr al-Islam wal Muslimin	Inconclusive
Battles of Toumbun Allura Kurnawa and Toumbun Gini (December 2022–January 2023)	Islamic State: West Africa Province (ISWAP)	Boko Haram	Defeat
Battle of Falagountou (January 2023)	Islamic State: Sahel Province	Burkina Faso: VDP auxiliaries	Indecisive
Intagamey attack (February 2023)	Islamic State in the Greater Sahara	Niger	Victory
Tin-Ediar attack (February 2023)	Islamic State - Sahel Province	Burkina Faso	Victory
Battle of Tin-Akoff (February 2023)	Islamic State - Sahil Province	Burkina Faso	Victory
Tabatol attack (October 2023)	Islamic State - Sahil Province	Niger	Victory
Labbezanga attack (December 2023)	Islamic State – Sahil Province	Mali; Wagner Group	Victory
Mucojo attack (February 2024)	Islamic State - Mozambique Province	Mozambique	Victory
2024 Karabulak clash (March 2024)	Islamic State – Caucasus Province	Russia	Defeat
Crocus City Hall attack (March 2024)	Islamic State – Khorasan Province	Russia	Victory
Teguey attack (March 2024)	Islamic State – Sahil Province	Niger	Indecisive
Puntland counter-terrorism operations (2024–present)	Islamic State	Puntland armed forces: Puntland Security Force; Puntland Dervish Force; Puntland Maritime Police Force; Unit of Counter-Terrorism; Puntland Police Force	Ongoing
Deir ez-Zor offensive (2024) (December 2024)	Islamic State	Syrian Democratic Forces; Supported by: CJTF–OIR; United States (Syria) Syrian Arab Republic (surrendered); Supported by: Russia (until 30 November); Iran (until 6 December) Syrian opposition (since 9 December)	Defeat
Chetoumane attack (December 2024)	Islamic State - Sahel Province	Niger	Victory
Malam-Fatori Suicide Bombing (January 2025)	Islamic State: Islamic State – West Africa Province	Nigeria	Indecisive
Kobé attack (February 2025)	Islamic State - Sahel Province	Mali; Wagner Group	Indecisive
July 2025 Southern Syria clashes	Supreme Legal Committee in Suwayda Israel	Syria (Note: Governed by the Syrian transitional government.); Pro-government Druze armed groups Bedouin tribes Islamic State (Note: Per BBC Arabic.)	Ongoing
Battle of Lake Chad	Islamic State: Islamic State – West Africa Province	Boko Haram	Defeat
December 2025 Palmyra attack (December 2025)	Islamic State	US; Syria	Indecisive
Operation Hawkeye Strike (December 2025)	Islamic State	US; Jordan	Indecisive
2026 Mali offensives	Azawad Liberation Front; Jama'at Nusrat al-Islam wal-Muslimin: Islamic State; Sahel Province	Mali Russia	Ongoing

== See also ==
- List of wars and battles involving al-Qaeda
