= 2021 Markoye Department attacks =

2021 conflict between Burkina Faso and Islamic State

- Part of Jihadist insurgency in Burkina Faso
Date	August 4, 2021
Location	Dambam, Guevara, Tokabangou, Badnoogo, Bassian, Gadba, Markoye Department, Oudalan Province, Burkina Faso
Result	Indecisive

Belligerents
Burkina Faso: Burkina Faso Armed Forces; Volunteers for the Defense of the Homeland	Islamic State in the Greater Sahara (suspected)

Casualties and losses
19 killed	10+ killed
- 11 civilians killed

On August 4, 2021, jihadists from the Islamic State in the Greater Sahara attacked several towns and Burkinabe bases in Markoye Department, Oudalan Province, Burkina Faso. Several rural villages were raided and civilians were killed, and the jihadist raids on Burkinabe bases in Tokabangou sparked battles that killed dozens of Burkinabe soldiers and ISGS fighters. The attacks were the deadliest day for the Burkinabe government since the Solhan and Tadaryat massacres in June 2021.

== Background ==
Markoye Department is located in Oudalan Province, the northernmost part of Burkina Faso and on the borders of Niger and Mali. Since 2015, north and northeastern Burkina Faso has been embroiled in an insurgency by the Mali-based Jama'at Nasr al-Islam wal-Muslimin, the Niger-based Islamic State in the Greater Sahara, and the homegrown Burkinabe Ansarul Islam. In the neighboring Séno Province, eighteen people were killed in the Yattakou massacre in April 2021. In February 2021, eight people were killed and nine were injured in an ambush on a civilian convoy between Markoye and Tokabangou.

== Attacks ==
The jihadists launched several attacks against villages in Markoye department at around noon on August 4, 2021. The villages of Dambam, Guevara, and Tokabangou, all of which are located ten kilometers from the department capital of Markoye, were attacked, along with the villages of Badnoogo, Bassian, and Gadba. The attackers stole livestock and raided and torched homes.

Pro-government Volunteers for the Defense of the Homeland (VDP) militants based at the Burkinabe garrison in Markoye were dispatched to combat the attacks, but were ambushed near Tokabangou. On August 5, the Burkinabe Ministry of Defense stated that the area that was attacked was under government control, and that government forces had launched a counteroffensive to find the perpetrators.

== Aftermath ==
The Burkinabe Ministry of Defense stated that fifteen Burkinabe soldiers, four VDP militiamen, and eleven civilians were killed in the attacks throughout the department. Burkinabe officials and RFI stated that at least ten jihadists were killed or injured during the attack. A fifth VDP militiamen was killed in a jihadist attack that same day in Pensa, Centre-Nord Region. The attacks were the deadliest day for the Burkinabe government since the Solhan and Tadaryat massacres in June 2021.

The Burkinabe Chief of Staff Moise Miningou visited Markoye on August 7 and spoke to the survivors. The fallen soldiers were buried in the Dori Military Cemetery in Dori on August 8, with their funerals being attended by various high-ranking military officials.

On November 1, 2021, ten civilians were killed in an attack between Dambam and Markoye by jihadists.
