= Battle of Tin-Akoff =

2023 battle in Burkina Faso

- Part of Jihadist insurgency in Burkina Faso
Date	February 20, 2023
Location	Tin-Akoff, Oudalan Province, Burkina Faso
Result	ISGS victory: Tin-Akoff and Tin-Akoff department falls under ISGS control

Belligerents
Burkina Faso	Islamic State - Sahil Province

Casualties and losses
15–100 killed 30 wounded	Unknown

On February 20, 2023, jihadists from the Islamic State – Sahil Province (ISGS) ambushed Burkinabe soldiers in Tin-Akoff, Oudalan Province, Burkina Faso. Between 15 and 100 Burkinabe soldiers were killed. The attack came just three days after the Tin-Ediar attack, where over seventy Burkinabe soldiers were killed in an ISGS attack.

== Background ==
Since 2015, Burkina Faso has been embroiled in an insurgency by the Mali-based Jama'at Nasr al-Islam wal-Muslimin, the Niger-based Islamic State in the Greater Sahara (ISGS), and the homegrown Burkinabe Ansarul Islam. These insurgent groups began besieging government-controlled towns starting with Arbinda in 2019, and by early 2022 dozens of towns, including provincial capitals, were under siege by JNIM and Ansarul Islam. Sieges became the modus operandi of these groups beginning in 2022, and jihadists often attacked civilians fleeing the areas while also preventing supplies and food from going in and out. In 2021, northern Burkinabe towns such as Inata were overrun by jihadists after months-long sieges.

ISGS has a heavy presence in Oudalan Province, where Tin-Akoff is located, and often ambushes Burkinabe soldiers traveling between bases in the province. Three days prior to the attack, ISGS attacked Burkinabe soldiers in Tin-Ediar, killing over seventy soldiers with Burkinabe officials claiming 160 jihadists were killed as well.

== Battle ==
The ISGS fighters in the Tin-Akoff attack had entered the town coming from Mali. The attack began on February 20 against a garrison of Burkinabe soldiers in the town. Heavy clashes broke out between the two groups, with the Burkinabe air force intervening and carrying out several airstrikes against the town. The Burkinabe soldiers fled, retreating to Markoye. The Islamic State stated that the battle lasted for only forty minutes.

Security sources told AFP that between 15 and 19 soldiers were killed in the battle, excluding the several dozen missing. RFI reported 30 wounded. Libération reported that the death toll could be as high as 100, citing security and humanitarian sources. The ISGS claimed responsibility for the attack on March 18, and stated that several dozen soldiers were killed or wounded.
