= Tadaryat =

Village in Burkina Faso

- Country: Burkina Faso
- Region: Sahel Region
- Province: Oudalan Province
- Department: Markoye Department

Tadaryat is a village in Markoye Department, Oudalan Province, Burkina Faso. A massacre occurred in Tadaryat in June 2021.
