= Operation Bourgou IV =

2019 battle in Burkina Faso

- Part of Jihadist insurgency in Burkina Faso
Date	November 1–17, 2019
Location	Tofagala Forest, Burkina Faso and Boulikessi, Mali
Result	French-G5 Sahel victory

Belligerents
G5 Sahel: Burkina Faso; Mali; Niger; France	Jama'at Nasr al-Islam wal Muslimin; Ansarul Islam; Islamic State in the Greater Sahara

Strength
1,400 troops: 800 Sahelien troops; 600 French troops	~500 (Tofagala Forest alone)

Casualties and losses
2 killed No other casualties	25 jihadists killed or captured 64 motorcycles destroyed

Between November 1 and 17, 2019, French and G5 Sahel troops conducted an operation against the jihadist groups of Jama'at Nasr al-Islam wal-Muslimin, Ansarul Islam, and the Islamic State in the Greater Sahara in Boulikessi, Déou, and Boula along the Malian and Burkinabe borders.

== Background ==
The northern border between Mali and Burkina Faso has been the epicenter of a jihadist insurgency launched by the Mali-based Jama'at Nasr al-Islam wal-Muslimin, the homegrown Burkinabe Ansarul Islam, and the Niger-based Islamic State in the Greater Sahara since 2015. French and G5 Sahel forces organized for the operation on November 1, mobilizing 1,400 soldiers; 600 French and 800 from the Burkinabe, Malian, and Nigerien contingents of the G5. The French forces included two Acier battalions, soldiers from the 16th Foothunters Battalion, a subgroup of tactical group Walsh, and logistics support from the Marne and Salamandre subgroups. Burkinabe forces assessed that around 500 jihadists were based in the Tofagala forest.

== Operation ==
The operation began at 2:30 am on November 1, when a convoy of 450 French soldiers and 52 vehicles commanded by Thibaut Lemerle left Gao, Mali. The convoy headed southeast, traveling 380 kilometers in 18 hours to reach Niamey, Niger. The column then headed west into Burkinabe territory, reaching Dori on November 2. On November 4, five gendarmes and six civilians were killed in a jihadist attack in Oursi. The French and G5 soldiers entered Oursi several hours later, discovering the bodies of the victims lined up against a tree on the outskirts of the town. The convoy then reached Deou on November 5.

Between November 7 and 12, allied soldiers conducted reconnaissance operations in the Tofagala forest, checking several dozen camps on the outskirts of the forest. Most of the camps were empty, and the men they did find were searched and let go due to lack of evidence connecting them to the jihadist groups. The allied forces didn't venture far into the forest itself due to the thickness of the vegetation.

On the night between November 7 and 8, the allied forces were attacked by jihadists on the edge of the forest. The jihadists initially approached to several hundred meters away from the camp, but were spotted at 6:45 pm. French forces fired warning shots and illuminating shells. The fighters retreated, but returned to the camp later in the night, and French forces yet again fired warning shots and illuminating shells. At 1:30 am, the jihadists brought thirty pick-ups to the edge of the forest in preparation for an assault on the camp. The third time, French and Burkinabe forces shot at the jihadists with machine guns and mortars, forcing the jihadists to retreat. The following day, no bodies or destroyed vehicles were found by allied troops at the scene of the battle.

Search operations continued following the clash, and Burkinabe soldiers switched to motorcycles to get around. While the motorcycles made them more vulnerable, it allowed the soldiers to move more easily. In Mali, French and Malian troops reinforced the Boulikessi outpost which had been attacked by jihadists a month prior. The Franco-Malian forces then searched the forests around Boulikessi, destroying sixty motorcycles and cell phone communications. The final battle took place on November 17, the end of the operation, when French, Malian, and Burkinabe soldiers cornered a group of jihadists in a forest.

== Aftermath ==
The French General Staff announced on November 18 that 24 jihadists were killed or taken prisoner during the operation, along with the telephones and motorcycles. The G5 Sahel then stated that 25 jihadists were killed or captured. Two Burkinabe soldiers were killed during the operation by an IED on November 5.
