= Intangom attack =

Islamic State attack in Tin-Akoff, Burkina Faso

- Part of Jihadist insurgency in Burkina Faso
Date	October 12, 2016
Location	Intangom, Tin-Akoff Department, Burkina Faso
Result	Indecisive

Belligerents
Burkina Faso	Islamic State in the Greater Sahara

Casualties and losses
4 killed 3 injured	Unknown
- 2 civilians killed

On October 12, 2016, jihadists from the Islamic State in the Greater Sahara attacked Burkinabe troops at Intangom, Tin-Akoff Department, Burkina Faso, killing four soldiers,

== Background ==
The village of Intangom, located on the border between Mali, Burkina Faso, and Niger, had already experienced an attack by jihadist groups on May 31, 2016. Two groups were active in the area at the time of the attack; al-Qaeda affiliate Jama'at Nasr al-Islam wal-Muslimin and the Islamic State in the Greater Sahara. The May attack killed three police officers, and no group claimed responsibility. In June, Burkinabe officials deployed twenty men as reinforcements to the town.

== Attack ==
The attack began at 5am on October 12, 2016, beginning with the attackers firing a rocket at the Burkinabe base in the town to force the soldiers outside. The soldiers who rushed out found themselves under attack, with some fighting back against the jihadists and others fleeing. Fighting between the soldiers and the jihadists lasted for three hours, with the attackers eventually fleeing to the Malian border with weapons and a pick-up with a machine gun. The pick-up was later abandoned. Burkinabe reinforcements from Markoye and Tin-Akoff arrived after the attackers fled.

The attack was claimed two days later by the Islamic State in the Greater Sahara, at the time a subsect of the ISWAP.

== Aftermath ==
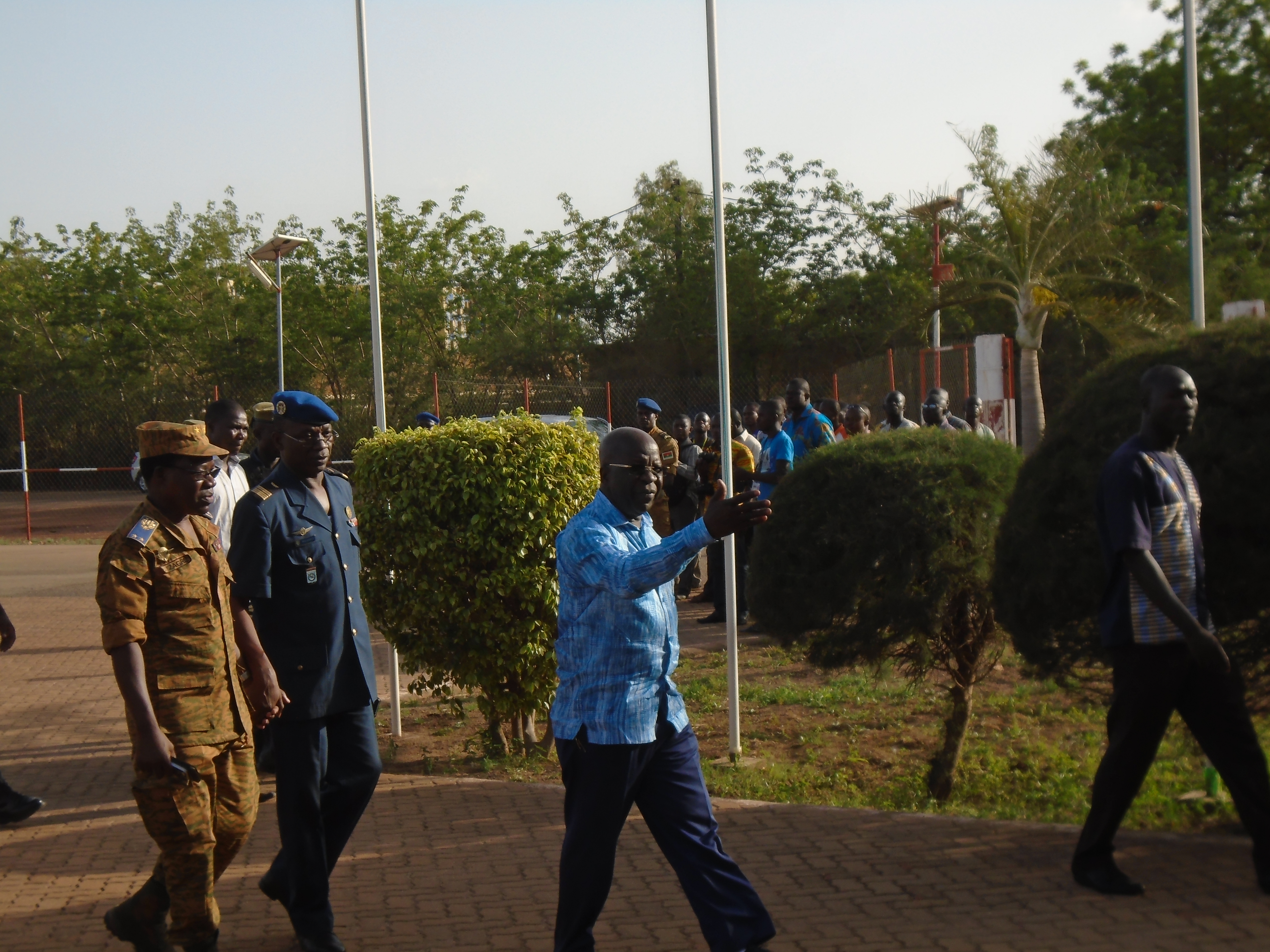
Minister Simon Compaoré and General Pingrenoma Zagre visiting Intangom following the May 31 attack.

Burkinabe security sources reported that three soldiers were killed in the attack, but three days later the body of a fourth soldier who fled was discovered nearby. All four soldiers belonged to the 11th RIC based in Dori. Three soldiers were also injured in the attack. Burkinabe officials initially reported the killing of two attackers, although these turned out to be two civilians who could've been mistaken for jihadists.
