= Fourkoussou =

Village in Sahel Region, Burkina Faso

- Location in Burkina Faso
- Coordinates: 14°19′N 0°27′W
- Country: Burkina Faso
- Region: Oudalan
- Time zone: UTC+0

Fourkoussou is a village in the Oudalan Province of the Sahel Region of north-eastern Burkina Faso.
