= Pensa =

Pensa is the present tense third person conjugation for the verb pensar ("to think") of the Portuguese language. It may also refer to:

- Pensa, Burkina Faso
- Pensa Custom Guitars, an American company that manufactures electric guitars
- Penza, a city in Russia
