= Tin-Ediar attack =

2023 battle between Burkina Faso and Islamic State

- Part of Jihadist insurgency in Burkina Faso
Date	February 17, 2023
Location	Tin-Ediar, Oudalan Province, Burkina Faso
Result	ISGS victory

Belligerents
Burkina Faso	Islamic State - Sahel Province

Casualties and losses
~70+ killed 5 captured Dozens wounded	60 killed (per ACSS); 160 killed (per Burkina Faso, denied by ISGS)

The Tin-Ediar attack or Déou attack occurred on February 17, 2023 when Burkinabe soldiers were ambushed by the Islamic State – Sahil Province (ISGS) near the village of Tin-Ediar while travelling between Déou and Oursi, Burkina Faso. Over 70 Burkinabe soldiers were killed in the ambush, and Burkinabe authorities stated 160 ISGS fighters were killed.

== Background ==
Since 2015, Burkina Faso has been embroiled in an insurgency by the Mali-based Jama'at Nasr al-Islam wal-Muslimin, the Niger-based Islamic State in the Greater Sahara (ISGS), and the homegrown Burkinabe Ansarul Islam. These insurgent groups began besieging government-controlled towns starting with Arbinda in 2019, and by early 2022 dozens of towns, including provincial capitals, were under siege by JNIM and Ansarul Islam. Sieges became the modus operandi of these groups beginning in 2022, and jihadists often attacked civilians fleeing the areas while also preventing supplies and food from going in and out. In 2021, northern Burkinabe towns such as Inata were overrun by jihadists after months-long sieges.

ISGS has a heavy presence in Oudalan Province, where Tin-Ediar is located, and often ambushes Burkinabe soldiers traveling between bases in the province.

== Attack ==
At the time of the attack, a convoy of Burkinabe soldiers was traveling between Déou and Oursi when they were ambushed by ISGS militants in Tin-Ediar. The soldiers in the convoy had been returning to their original base in Dori after having spent six months on the frontline. Immediately after the ambush, intense fighting began between the Burkinabe soldiers and the jihadists.

Journalist and Sahel expert Wassim Nasr attributed the attack to the Islamic State - Sahil Province, although Jama'at Nasr al-Islam wal-Muslimin (JNIM) is the most established jihadist group in the area. The Islamic State, in their statement on February 24 claiming responsibility for the attack, stated that they ambushed the soldiers with machine guns and other weapons.

== Aftermath ==
The Burkinabe army announced on February 20 that at least 51 soldiers were killed in the attack. RFI stated that the death toll was likely higher as several dozen soldiers were stil missing. Libération stated that local security sources assessed the death toll at seventy soldiers. Burkinabe officials stated that a "response" with "aerial actions" helped kill or injure 160 jihadists from ISGS. ISGS denied these figures in a broadcast on March 16. The Africa Center for Strategic Studies stated that about 60 jihadists were killed in the counteroffensive.

The ISGS stated that over seventy soldiers were killed in the ambush, and that five were captured and dozens more were injured. In photos broadcast by ISGS, the bodies of at least 54 soldiers are visible. The attack was the deadliest day for the Burkinabe army since the 2021 Inata attack.
