= Teguey attack =

2024 battle in Niger

- Part of Jihadist insurgency in Niger
| Date | March 21, 2024 |
| Location | Between Teguey and Bankilare, Tillabéri Region, Niger |
| Result | Indecisive |

Belligerents
| Niger | Islamic State – Sahil Province |

Strength
| Unknown | 100+ |

Casualties and losses
| 23 killed, 17 wounded (per Niger) 30 killed, dozens wounded, 8 vehicles destroyed (per ISGS) | 30 killed (per Niger) |

On March 21, 2024, militants from the Islamic State – Sahil Province (ISGS) ambushed Nigerien soldiers between the towns of Teguey and Bankilare, Tillabéri Region, Niger killing at least 23 soldiers.

== Background ==
In July 2023, disgruntled officers overthrew Nigerien president Mohamed Bazoum in a coup, claiming that Bazoum's government was not effectively countering the insurgencies of the Islamic State in the Greater Sahara and Jama'at Nasr al-Islam wal-Muslimin in the western part of the country. JNIM and ISGS are most active in the tri-border area between Niger, Mali, and Burkina Faso, the latter two having had coups that installed military juntas within the past two years.

Since the coup, jihadist attacks escalated, with an attack in Koutougou in August 2023 killing 17 soldiers and an attack in Tabatol killing at least sixty Nigerien soldiers.

== Attack ==
The Nigerien army stated that a convoy of Nigerien troops were ambushed by jihadists in between the towns of Teguey and Bankilare during a combing operation in the area on March 21, 2024. In the statement, Nigerien officials said that over 100 fighters aboard motorcycles used IEDs and suicide bombers to ambush the soldiers.

Nigerien officials claimed 23 soldiers were killed in the attack, and 17 others were wounded. The ISGS claimed responsibility on March 23, claiming to have killed 30 soldiers and wounded dozens of others. The Nigerien junta also claimed that 30 jihadists were killed in the attack.

The government of Niger declared three days of national mourning to honour the fallen soldiers. In the capital of Niger, Niamey, a ceremony was held for the soldiers' funeral.
