= Solhan and Tadaryat massacres =

Insurgent attacks in Burkina Faso

Solhan massacre
- Part of the Islamist insurgency in Burkina Faso
- Yagha Province
- Location: 13°22′35″N 00°27′28″E; Solhan, Yagha Province, Burkina Faso
- Date: 4–5 June 2021
- Deaths: 160
- Injuries: 40
- Perpetrators: JNIM (per Burkina Faso and ISIS, denied by JNIM): Mujahid al-Qaida
- Accused: Mano Tidjani; Woba Dikoure

On 4 and 5 June 2021, jihadists from Jama'at Nasr al-Islam wal-Muslimin (JNIM) attacked the village of Solhan, Yagha Province, Burkina Faso. At least 160 people were killed in the massacres, making it the deadliest attacks up to that point in the jihadist insurgency in Burkina Faso since the start of the war in 2015.

== Background ==
Since 2019, northern Burkina Faso has been embroiled in two jihadist insurgencies by the Islamic State in the Greater Sahara and Jama'at Nasr al-Islam wal-Muslimin, both predominantly-Fulani organizations that attack civilians along ethnic and religious lines. The Burkinabe government has increased efforts to combat the insurgencies by recruiting civilian militias known as the Volunteers for the Defense of the Homeland (VDP), although Burkinabe forces and VDP have been accused of killing Fulani civilians en masse.

On June 4, a day before the massacre, jihadists attacked the village of Tadaryat, located in Oudalan Province, killing thirteen civilians and a soldier. The jihadists also raided the community's motorbikes and cattle.

== Massacres ==
At around 2 am on June 5, armed men on around 20 motorcycles attacked Solhan, first targeting the village's VDP outpost. The insurgents then entered civilian homes, carrying out summary executions. A mine adjacent to Solhan was also attacked by the insurgents during the massacre. The perpetrators left around dawn, some three hours before police response forces arrived in the village. Upon leaving the village the attackers left a number of improvised explosive devices on the roads leading into the village. These were disarmed by engineers from the Burkinabé army in the following days.

The attacks are thought to have been the deadliest in Burkina Faso for five years. Many of the survivors fled to Sebba, the capital of Yagha province, some 15 kilometres (9.3 mi) from Solhan. The dead from Solhan have been buried in three mass graves by local residents. According to government spokesman Ousseni Tamboura, the attack in Solhan was carried out primarily by child soldiers between the ages of 12 and 14.

== Response ==
=== Government and international responses ===
The Burkinabe government blamed terrorists for the attack; however no group has since claimed responsibility for the massacre. The president, Roch Kaboré, issued a statement of condolences about the attack stating; "I bow before the memory of the hundreds of civilians killed in this barbaric attack and extend my condolences to the families of the victims." Kaboré cancelled a planned trip to Lomé, Togo because of the incidents.

A 72-hour period of national mourning was declared by the government. Some women in the country planned to wear all white on 7 June 2021 as a mark of respect for those killed. The Burkinabé National Police redeployed units in response to the massacres and in anticipation of further attacks.

António Guterres, secretary-general of the United Nations, who have thousands of peacekeepers stationed in the country, stated that he was "outraged" by the attacks. Pope Francis mentioned the Solhan massacre in his Angelus prayers and stated that Africa needs peace and not violence.

=== Responsibility ===
Jama'at Nasr al-Islam wal Muslimin denied responsibility for the attack and condemned it in a statement on June 8. On June 24, the Burkinabe government stated that the attack was perpetrated by Mujahid al-Qaida, a katiba of JNIM previously unknown to experts. The Islamic State in an Al-Naba statement on June 25 accused an "undisciplined" katiba of JNIM for the attack, and claimed that the massacre was a result of internal fighting between JNIM. Sahel researcher Heni Nsaibia stated that prior to the attack, JNIM used to distinguish itself from ISGS by highlighting the ISGS' massacres. By condemning the massacre, JNIM disassociated itself from it.

A Burkinabe government investigation reported that the massacre was premeditated and planned on May 21, 2021. The objective was to loot Solhan to finance JNIM's operations. The group alleged to have committed the massacre was reported to have committed previous attacks in Solhan and Sebba, along with Boundoré and Koholoko on the Burkinabe-Nigerien border, and incursions into Benin and Niger. Mujahid al-Qaida was also accused of carrying out an attack on a mining convoy between Ouragou and Boungou on November 6, 2019 that killed 37 people.

Two jihadists, Mano Tidjani and Woba Dikoure, were issued warrants for their arrest by Burkinabe authorities in response to the massacre. Tidjani and Dikoure were accused of playing a key role in carrying out and planning the Solhan massacre. Tidjani, in the investigation, was reported to be commanding a JNIM base in Boundore.

=== Aftermath ===
The Burkinabe army stated that a dozen jihadists were killed or injured in a combing operation near Solhan between June 7 and 13.

== See also ==
- List of terrorist incidents in 2021
