= Chetoumane attack =

2024 battle in Niger

- Part of Jihadist insurgency in Niger
Date	December 10, 2024
Location	Chetoumane, Tera Department, Tillaberi Region, Niger
Result	ISGS victory

Belligerents
Niger	Islamic State - Sahel Province

Strength
140 soldiers	Unknown

Casualties and losses
90-130+ killed	none
- 50+ civilians killed

On December 10, 2024, jihadists from the Islamic State – Sahel Province attacked Nigerien soldiers at a market in Chetoumane, Tillabéri Region, Niger, killing at least 90 soldiers and over 50 civilians.

== Background ==
In July 2023, disgruntled officers overthrew Nigerien president Mohamed Bazoum in a coup, claiming that Bazoum's government was not effectively countering the insurgencies of the Islamic State in the Greater Sahara and Jama'at Nasr al-Islam wal-Muslimin in the western part of the country. JNIM and ISGS are most active in the tri-border area between Niger, Mali, and Burkina Faso, the latter two having had coups that installed military juntas within the past two years.

Since the coup, jihadist attacks escalated, with an attack in Koutougou in August 2023 killing 17 soldiers and an attack in Tabatol killing at least sixty Nigerien soldiers and an attack in March 2024 in Teguey killing at least 30.

== Attack ==
The attack occurred at a weekly market in Chetoumane on December 10 where 140 Nigerien soldiers were called in to defend. There were more jihadists than there were soldiers, effectively besieging the soldiers. While the attack wasn't claimed, Chetoumane is located in an area where the Islamic State is active. The Nigerien army denied the existence of an attack in Chetoumane, and did not confirm any casualties. Only ten bodies of soldiers, who fell in an ambush near Petel Kole, were symbolically buried in Martyrs' Square in Niamey.

According to security and medical sources interviewed by RFI, at least ninety soldiers and fifty civilians were killed in the attack. Jeune Afrique reported that at least 130 soldiers were killed in the attack, with some sources reporting over 200 people were killed. The BBC corroborated similar tolls.

== Reactions ==
Nigerien authorities continued to deny the attack's existence, and suspended BBC from working in the country in response to their reporting on the attack. Communications Minister Sidi Mohamed Railou also filed a complaint against RFI for "orchestrating a vast campaign of disinformation."
