= Markoye Department =

Coordinates: 14°38′21″N 0°02′14″E

Markoye
- Department
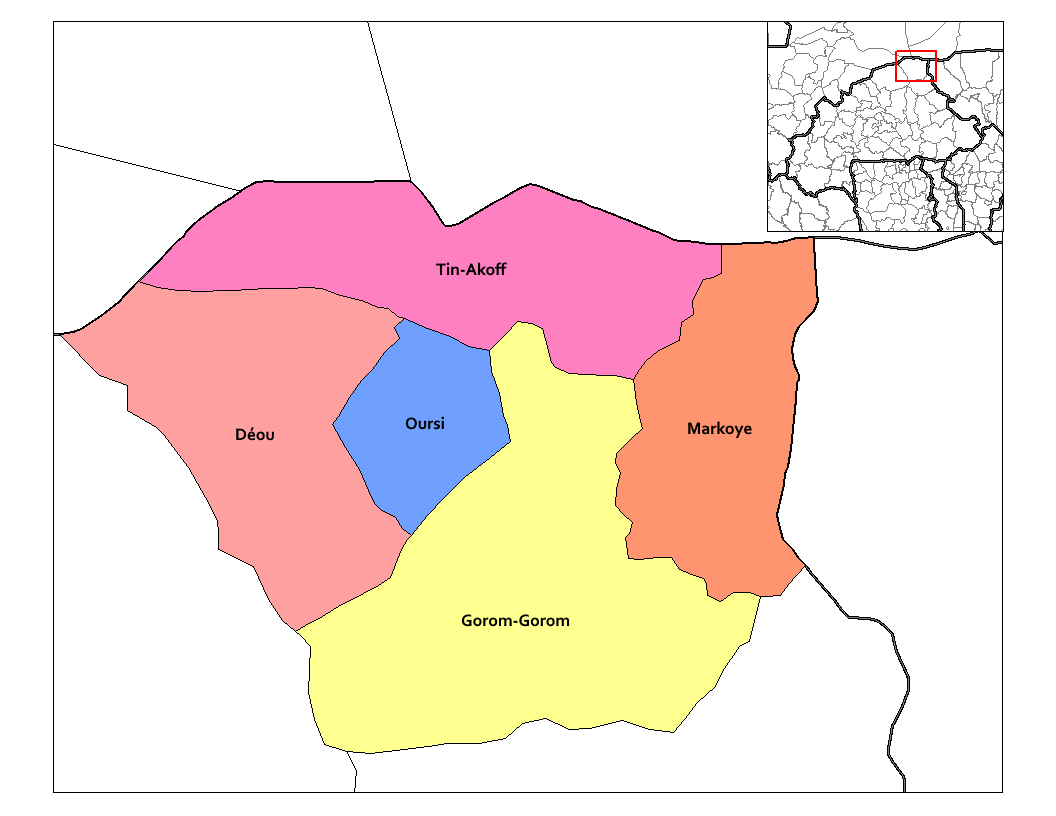
- Markoye Department location in the province
- Country: Burkina Faso
- Province: Oudalan Province

Area
  - Total: 578 sq mi (1,498 km^{2})

Population (2019 census)
  - Total: 28,486
  - Density: 49.25/sq mi (19.02/km^{2})
- Time zone: UTC+0 (GMT 0)

Markoye is a department or commune of Oudalan Province in northern Burkina Faso. Its capital lies at the town of Markoye.

== Towns and villages ==
Gorom-Gorom Department, Oudalan Province, Sahel Region, Burkina Faso, Tin-Akoff Department.
