= 2019–2020 Kunar offensive =

Taliban offensive against Islamic State

- Part of the War in Afghanistan (2001–2021) and the Islamic State–Taliban conflict
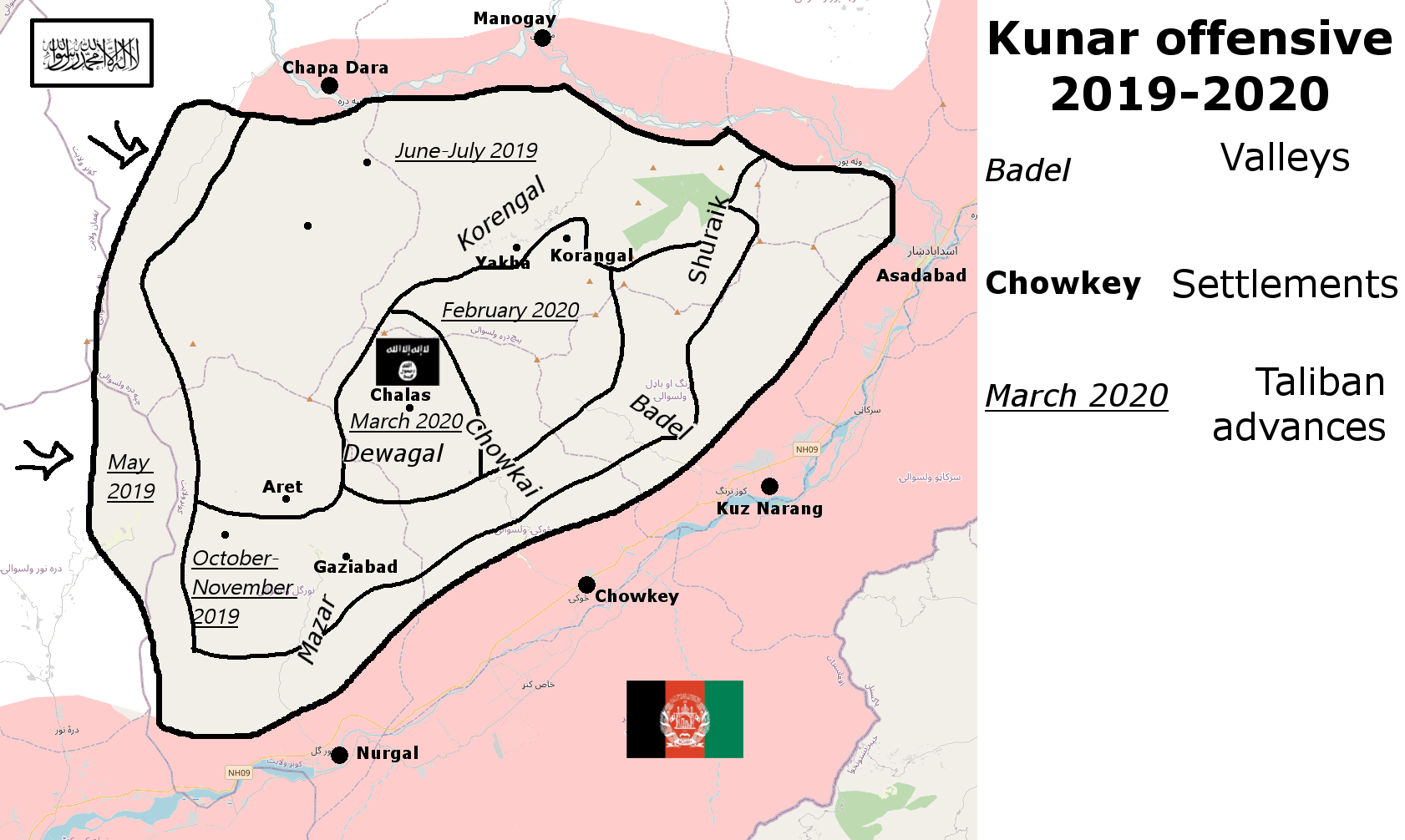
- Approximate map of the offensive
Date	May – November 2019; February – March 2020
Location	Kunar province, Afghanistan
Result	Major Taliban victory: Taliban conquer ISIS–K strongholds in Kunar province

Belligerents
Taliban	Islamic State: Khorasan Province	Afghanistan United States

Commanders and leaders
	Abdullah Orokzai	

Casualties and losses
	Hundreds killed and surrendered	

Kunar offensive (May 2019 – March 2020) was a major offensive by Taliban forces against Islamic State in Kunar province which led to conquer of their territorial stronghold and death or surrender of most IS forces. Terror cells however remained active in the area.

== Timeline ==
In April of May 2019 government forces and Taliban signed a deal in Kunar province which led to abolition of roadblocks and allowed both sides to pass through territories controlled by other side.

In May 2019 Taliban went on offensive against the Islamic State attacking their bases in Manogai and Chapa Dara districts, advancing from Laghman in the north, while simultaneously Taliban and local uprising forces from Chapa Dara district attacked parts of Korengal valley. Taliban managed to take control of those areas. From the south through Dara-ye Nur, Maulawi Asadullah (Taliban shadow district governor for Nurgal district) and his forces continued to advance towards Mazar Dara. Further Taliban advances on Dewagal valley were stopped by American airstrikes which struck both Taliban and ISKP forces leading to 50-80 IS fighters being killed and around 100 injured. 40 ISKP fighters surrendered to government forces in May 2019. Later that month group of foreign fighters arrived in the area to aid Islamic State. The group moved to Chalas and Kalaigal villages.

In mid-June 2019 Taliban launched offensive against ISKP forces in Degal village of Chapa Dara district. After week of fighting they cleared the district. In the same month they attacked two bases in Korengal and Kalaigal clearing them of IS fighters. On 23 August ISKP leader Mawlawi Basir surrendered along with 110 of his fighters.

In late October 2019 Taliban advanced through Narang-Badel and Chawkai district towards Dewagal taking a few villages in the area. U.S. again conducted airstrikes against both Taliban and ISKP forces. Mawlawi Khadem and Mawlawi Bashir commanders along with dozens of Islamic State fighters were killed in the airstrike. Due to airstrikes Taliban withdrew from Dewagal towards Badel and Korengal valleys. Heavy snowfalls from December 2019 to February 2020 stopped further advances.

In late February 2020 Taliban resumed advances on Dewagal valley, while U.S. airstrikes targeted ISKP fighters. As a result of the strikes, multiple IS commanders were killed including Qari Sayed, Mawlawi Sharafuddin, Sheikh Attaullah, Mawlawi Halimi, Sheikh Khetab and Haji Musa. Hundreds of fighters surrender to the government and were transferred to Asadabad. Between 3 and 4 March heavy clashes were reportedly ongoing in Mazar Dara (Nurgal), Dewagal Dara (Chawkay), and Shoraik and Kalaigal areas (Dara-ePech). 7,000 people were displaced as a result of clashes in Nurgal district.

On 14 March Taliban forces claimed that as a result of 14-day offensive they have cleared entire Kunar province from ISKP forces. They also claimed that 114 IS members surrendered to Taliban while 100 fled. U.S. officials claimed that dozens of Islamic State fighters also surrendered to government forces.

After retaking Dewagal, Mazar and Badel valley Taliban burned down houses of ISKP commanders and executed at least seven Islamic State fighters in Dewagal valley. They also arrested several tribal elders who cooperated with the enemy.

== Aftermath ==
While as a result of the offensive ISKP military presence disappeared from the area, they remained active underground operating several terror cells in Dewagal, Badel and Quro valley.
