= Pensa, Burkina Faso =

Pensa
- Location within Burkina Faso
- Coordinates: 13°38′26″N 0°48′34″W
- Country: Burkina Faso
- Province: Bam Province
- Time zone: UTC+0 (GMT)

Pensa (also, Ponsa and Pinsa) is a town in Bam Province, Burkina Faso.
