= Déou Department =

Coordinates: 14.6°N 0.7167°W

Déou
- Department
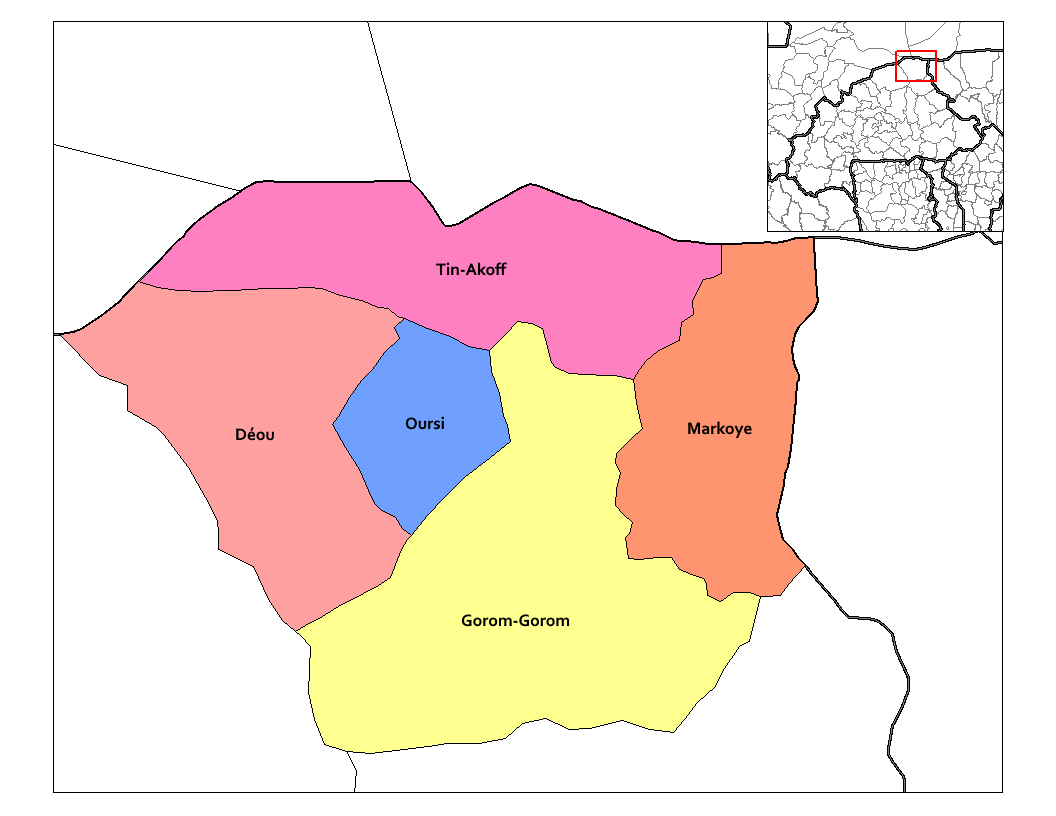
- Déou Department location in the province
- Country: Burkina Faso
- Province: Oudalan Province

Area
  - Total: 855 sq mi (2,215 km^{2})

Population (2019)
  - Total: 31,431
  - Density: 36.75/sq mi (14.19/km^{2})
- Time zone: UTC+0 (GMT 0)

Déou is a department or commune of Oudalan Province in northern Burkina Faso. Its capital lies at the town of Déou.
