= Oursi Department =

Coordinates: 14°41′N 0°28′W

Oursi
- Department
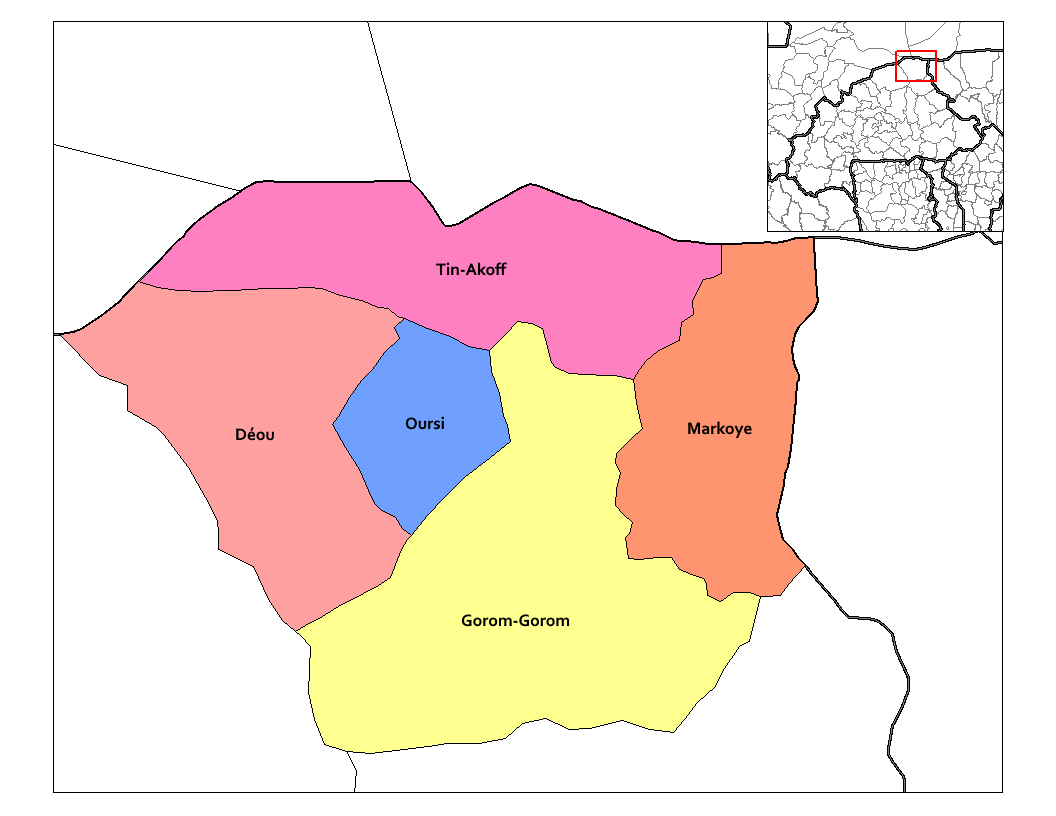
- Oursi Department location in the province
- Country: Burkina Faso
- Province: Oudalan Province

Area
  - Total: 235.8 sq mi (610.6 km^{2})

Population (2019)
  - Total: 17,004
  - Density: 72.13/sq mi (27.85/km^{2})
- Time zone: UTC+0 (GMT 0)

Oursi is a department or commune of Oudalan Province in northern Burkina Faso. Its capital lies at the town of Oursi.
