= Tin-Akoff Department =

Coordinates: 14.9000°N 0.4000°W

Tin-Akoff
- Department
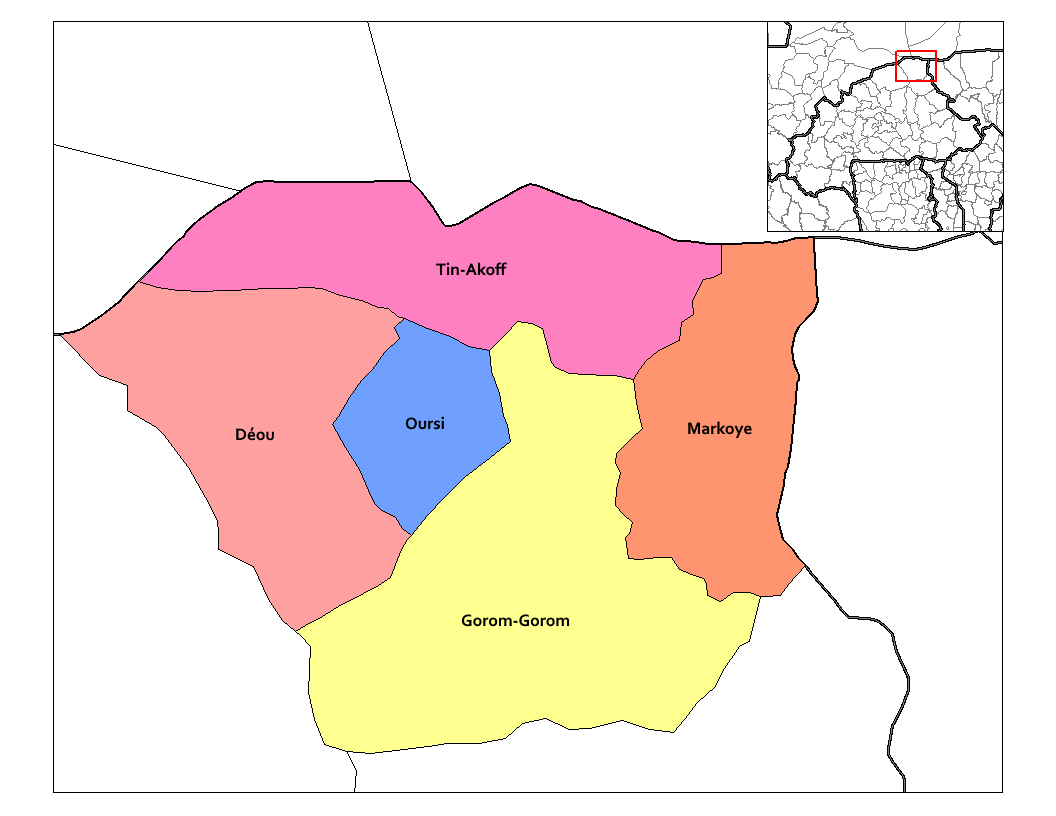
- Tin-Akoff Department location in the province
- Country: Burkina Faso
- Province: Oudalan Province

Area
  - Total: 938 sq mi (2,429 km^{2})

Population (2019)
  - Total: 8,831
  - Density: 9.416/sq mi (3.636/km^{2})
- Time zone: UTC+0 (GMT 0)

Tin-Akoff is a department or commune of Oudalan Province in northern Burkina Faso. Its capital lies at the town of Tin-Akoff.
