= Tabatol attack =

2023 terrorist attack in Niger

- Part of the Jihadist insurgency in Niger
Date	2 October 2023
Location	Tabatol, Tahoua Region, Niger
Result	ISGS victory

Belligerents
Niger	Islamic State - Sahil Province

Strength
Unknown	100+

Casualties and losses
60 killed (per RFI); 29 killed (per Niger)	"Dozens" (per Niger); 3 killed (per IS)

On 2 October 2023, over 60 Nigerien soldiers were killed in the village of Tabatol, Niger. The soldiers had been reinforcing a Nigerien outpost that had been attacked by the Islamic State – Sahil Province (ISGS) earlier in the day, and the reinforcements were attacked a second time by over 100 militants from the Islamic State's Sahel Province, who used IEDs and "kamikaze vehicles". The attack was the deadliest in the country since the coup d'état in July.

== Background ==
Niger has battled an Islamist insurgency since 2015 after extremist groups mainly from Mali began to spread their influence across the Sahel. Since then, the borders between Niger, Mali, and Burkina Faso, known as the "three borders", has been a hotspot for Islamic terrorism.

On 26 July 2023, Niger's president was successfully overthrown in a coup d'état, and Abdourhamane Tiani proclaimed himself the leader of a new military junta.

Earlier in the week, 12 Nigerien soldiers were killed on 29 September in Kandadji after they were attacked by jihadists. On 16 August, 17 Nigerien soldiers were also killed by suspected jihadists near the town of Koutougou.

== Attack ==
The attack took place while soldiers were returning from operations aimed at "neutralizing" the threat posed by the Islamic State – Sahil Province (ISGS). Nigerien soldiers had been dispatched to the location of an outpost near Takanamat, where ISGS had ambushed earlier. The reinforcements were attacked by over 100 armed insurgents in vehicles using homemade explosive devices. An initial toll stated 29 Nigerien soldiers were killed, and two were severely wounded. "Several dozen" militants were also killed, but no official number was disclosed, and there was no information on who was responsible for the attack. Niger's defense minister claimed that 15 motorcycles owned by the militants were also destroyed, and a large quantity of weapons and ammunition were seized.

Officials and civilian sources later reported the death toll as up to sixty soldiers killed, although the Nigerien junta maintained that 29 soldiers were killed and two were wounded. The Tabatol attack was the deadliest attack on Nigerien troops since the coup d'etat.

== Reactions ==
Niger's government issued three days of national mourning.

=== International ===
The Saudi Arabian Ministry of Foreign Affairs stated that the country "expressed deep sorrow and sympathy to the families of the victims and the government and people of Niger."

The General Secretariat of the Organization of Islamic Cooperation condemned the attack in the strongest terms, and extended its condolences to the families of those killed and to all the people of Niger during the period of mourning. They described the attack as "heinous" and wished a speedy recovery to the injured. The OIC General Secretariat also reiterated the organization's position against terrorism, and renewed its support to Niger and other Sahel countries.

Algeria condemned the terrorist attack "in the strongest terms", the country's Ministry of Foreign Affairs stated.

Qatar's Ministry of Foreign Affairs stated that the State of Qatar strongly condemned the attack, and reaffirmed its stance against terrorism and other acts of violence.

Egypt condemned the attack and extended its condolences to Niger. The country stressed its stance against terrorism and called upon the international community to concert efforts to combat it.

Jordan's Ministry of Foreign Affairs condemned the attack in Niger. The ministry's spokesperson, Sufyan al-Qudah, empathized Jordan's stance against all forms of violence and terrorism, and expressed his condolences and sympathy to the government and people of Niger, and to the families of the victims. He also wished a swift recovery for the injured.
