= Markoye =

Markoye, Burkina Faso
- Department Capital
- Location within Burkina Faso
- Country: Burkina Faso
- Region: Sahel
- Province: Oudalan Province
- Time zone: UTC+0 (GMT)

Markoye is a town in northern Burkina Faso, in the province of Oudalan. It is the site of Burkina Faso’s coldest recorded temperature of 5.0 °C (41.0 °F).

== Economy ==
There is a weekly cattle and camel market in the town and it is close to a manganese mine in Tambao.

== Transport ==
It is a station on a proposed phosphate railway.

== See also ==
- Railway stations in Burkina Faso
