= Oudalan Province =

Coordinates: 14°27′N 0°14′W

Oudalan
- Province
- Location in Burkina Faso

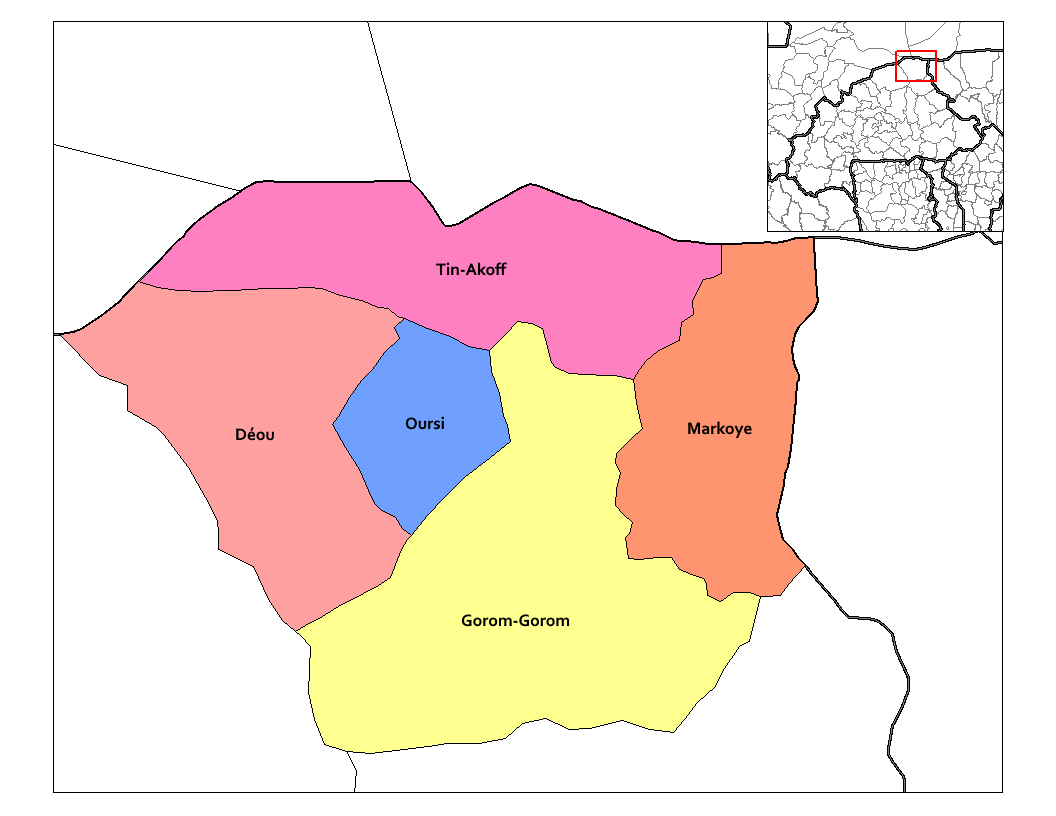
- Provincial map of its departments
- Country: Burkina Faso
- Region: Sahel Region
- Capital: Gorom-Gorom

Area
  - Province: 9,832 km^{2} (3,796 sq mi)

Population (2019 census)
  - Province: 158,146
  - Density: 16.08/km^{2} (41.66/sq mi)
  - Urban: 9,752
- Time zone: UTC+0 (GMT 0)

Oudalan is one of the 45 provinces of Burkina Faso, located in its Sahel Region. Its capital is Gorom-Gorom. The 2019 census reported 158,146 people living in the province.

== Departments ==
The province is divided into 5 departments.

The Departments of Oudalan
Department	Capital city	Population (Census 2006)
Déou Department	Déou	25,745
Gorom-Gorom Department	Gorom-Gorom	104,587
Markoye Department	Markoye	29,988
Oursi Department	Oursi	16,093
Tin-Akoff Department	Tin-Akoff	20,827

== See also ==
- Regions of Burkina Faso
- Provinces of Burkina Faso
- Departments of Burkina Faso
