= Arab tribal insurgency in Eastern Syria =

Armed rebellions from 2023

- Part of the Syrian Civil War (until 2024) and Eastern Syria insurgency
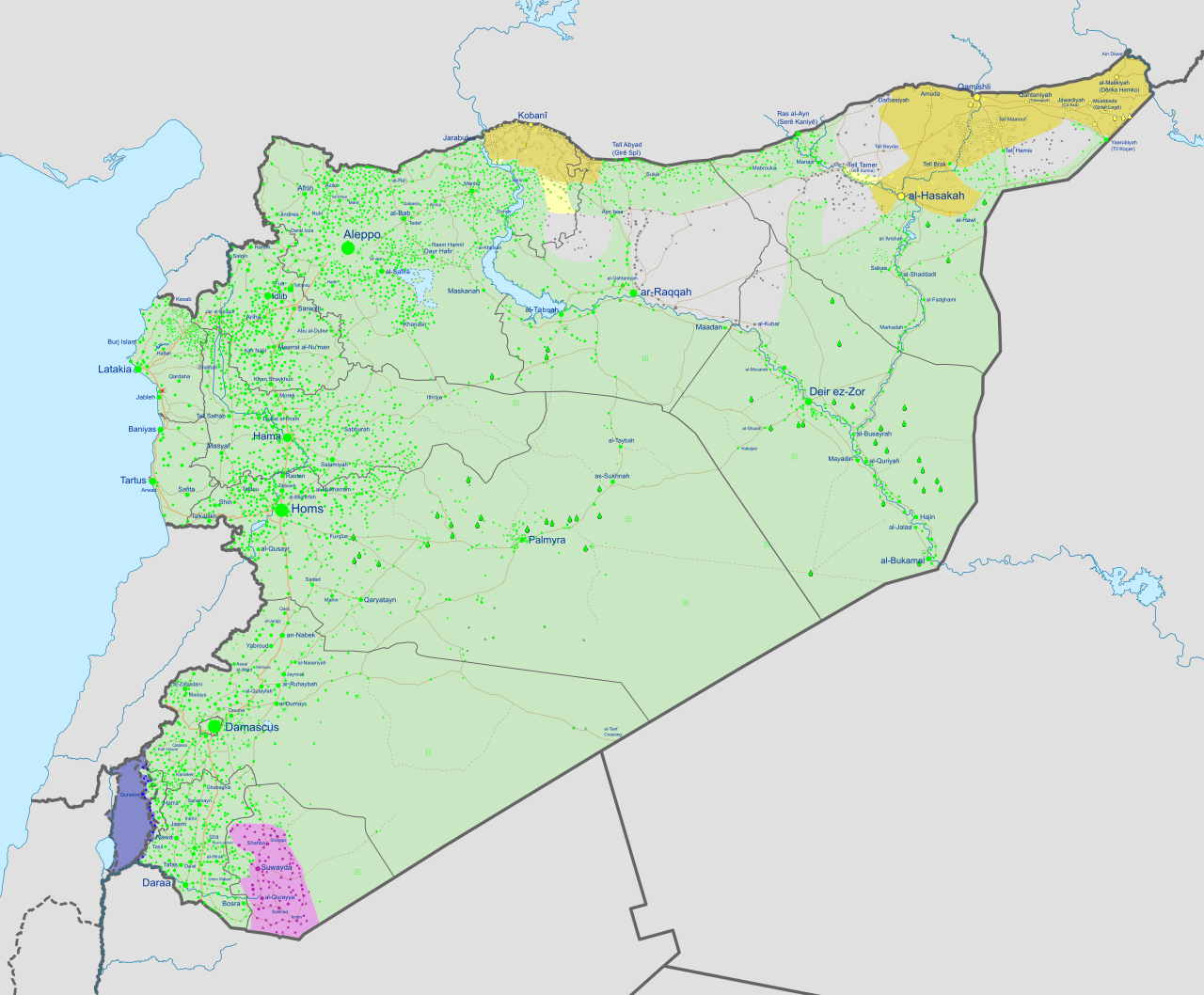
- Syrian transitional government and the Arab Tribal and Clan Forces Syrian Democratic Forces
Date	27 August 2023 – 30 January 2026 (2 years, 5 months and 3 days)
Location	Deir ez-Zor Governorate and Raqqa Governorate, Syria
Status	Syrian government-Arab Tribal victory: Raqqa and Deir ez-Zor Governorates are to be ceded to the Syrian transitional government; SDF agrees to join the Syrian army

Belligerents
Arab Tribal and Clan Forces; Local Tribes; Supported by: Turkey; Ba'athist Syria (until 2024); Supported by: Iran (until 2024); (Syria) Syrian transitional government (since 2024)	Autonomous Administration of North and East Syria

Commanders and leaders
Ibrahim al-Hafl; Hashim al-Sattam Muhammad al-Sa'eed (Ba'athist Syria) Nawaf al-Bashir Ahmed al-Sharaa; Murhaf Abu Qasra; Ali Noureddine al-Naasan; Abu Hatem Shaqra; Anwar al-Saleh al-Hamoud	Mazloum Abdi; Ferhad Şamî; Sipan Hamo; Ayed al-Turki al-Khabil; Nesrin Abdullah (Syria) Abu Omar al-Idlibi

Units involved
Arab Tribal and Clan Forces; Dulaim; Albu Khabur; Al-Shaitat; Al-Baggara; al-Buhamad clan; Al-Uqaydat; al-Bakir; Al-Busraya; Shammar tribes; Al-Sanadid Forces (former SDF group switched sides); Lions of the Ougaidat Brigade (until 2025); Shuwait clan; Hashemite Tribes Regiment; Syrian Armed Forces; Syrian Arab Army; National Defence Forces; Liwa al-Quds; Popular Resistance of the Eastern Region; Local militias; (Ba'athist Syria) "Ousoud al-Ashiyer" militia; (Ba'athist Syria) Ahmed Al-Rayes's militia; (Ba'athist Syria) Zidan Al-Halloush's militia; (Syria) Syrian Armed Forces; Syrian Army; 86th Division; Local militias; (Syria) Al-Busraya Revolutionaries	Syrian Democratic Forces; Deir ez-Zor Military Council; Women's Protection Units; Internal Security Forces; (Syria) Northern Democratic Brigade; People's Defense Units; United States Air Force (before Assad's fall)

Strength
Unknown	Unknown

Casualties and losses
1 killed, 3 injured	Unknown killed 6 captured
- Unknown

The Arab tribal insurgency in Eastern Syria took place against the Syrian Democratic Forces (SDF) in the Deir ez-Zor Governorate region from 2025 to 2026.

== Background ==
Arab tribal representatives have accused the SDF of stealing the region's oil resources and using its wealth to fund Kurdish-majority regions in the occupation during Deir ez-Zor campaign (2017–2019). In addition to the SDF's discrimination against Arab tribal groups.

In July 2023, SDF forces moved towards the Euphrates apparently to deter an attack by Iranian and Syrian forces massing on the west bank of the river.

== Timeline ==
=== 2023 ===
On 27 August 2023, clashes broke out between the Syrian Democratic Forces and Arab Tribal and Clan Forces, after the arrest of Abu Khawla, the commander of the Deir ez-Zor Military Council. Jalal Al-Khabil, a commander of the Deir ez-Zor Military Council, called on the International Coalition Forces to intervene and ordered armed men from the Al-Uqaydat tribe to besiege the SDF headquarters to exert pressure to free Abu Khawla. The al-Bakir, al-Shuhayl, Dulaim and Albu Khabur tribes took up arms against the SDF, while the Al-Baggara and most of the Al-Shaitat have remained aligned with the SDF. The "Ousoud al-Ashiyer" militia, led by Nawaf al-Bashir, backed by Iran, on 31 August, attempted to cross the Euphrates from government-held areas to join the Deir ez-Zor rebellion, The attack was repelled by the SDF and by the United States Air Force. Around the same time, clashes erupted at Jadid Ekaydat; the SDF stormed the village, and was resisted by Syrian government loyalists including members of Liwa al-Quds, Zidan Al-Halloush's militia, and Ahmed Al-Rayes's militia. Ibrahim al-Hifl, published a statement in 30 August urging all tribes in the region to join the uprising. While some factions of Baggara tribe clashed with SDF fighters, its leadership positioned themselves as neutral, pressing for ceasefire and negotiations with SDF. The Women's Protection Units participated in the clashes. The involvement of the SDF female troops was seen an insult by supporters of the tribes, with one tribal elder stating "They put them in our hometown just to send a message that our women will get you".

On 1 September, tribal fighters launched an attack against SDF-controlled positions in the Manbij District from areas controlled by the Turkish-backed Syrian National Army. The fighters reportedly captured three villages including al-Muhsinli and Arab Hassan, although there were later claims that they withdrew due to artillery fire. They had also allegedly captured two villages in northwestern Aleppo under the control of the Syrian government but later withdrew from the villages after coming under heavy shelling and Russian airstrikes. On 4 September, Al-Dhiban was the last major stronghold of the rebels, though some remnant anti-SDF forces operated in other areas. On the next day, the SDF advanced into al-Dhiban and retook about 40% of it. The SDF also captured Hawaij Thiban and advanced toward Al-Tayanah, where other rebels held out. On 6 September, the SDF fully captured Al-Dhiban, the exact fate of the rebellion's main leader, Sheikh Ibrahim Al-Hifl, was initially unclear, but it was confirmed that he had fled from Al-Dhiban. On 8 September, SDF had established control over the region between al-Tayyanah and Al-Baghuz Fawqani. This marked SDF's recapture of all territories in the eastern Deir ez-Zor region, since the eruption of the armed uprising in 27 August.

On 25 September, Iranian-backed militias launched an incursion into the areas previously affected by the tribal revolt. They received support by several local armed tribesmen, and took control of parts of Dhiban, the SDF declared a curfew from al-Shuhayl to al-Baghuz. On 27 September, the SDF had defeated the militias and retaken the area.

=== 2024 ===
On 6 August 2024, the National Defence Forces, a pro-Ba'athist Syria group, and tribal militias launched attacks towards Diban, al-Latwa and Abu Hamam against the SDF, the Arab Tribal and Clan Forces attacked several military checkpoints and sites belonging to the SDF in Abu Hardub, Diban y As-Sabha. The Arab Tribal and Clan Forces took up positions in the cities of Diban, Abu Hamam, Gharanij, Shaitat and Kishkiye after clashes with elements of the SDF and their subsequent withdrawal, Hashem Masoud al-Sattam, leader of the Lions of the Ougaidat Brigade militia, participating in the attack on the SDF in Deir ez-Zor, the Lions of Okaidat, overran the towns of Gharanij and Um Al Hamam, before withdrawal.

On 6 December, the tribal group "Al-Busraya Revolutionaries", took the cities of Al-Shamitiya and Al-Kharita, after defecting from Syrian Democratic Forces and swearing allegiance to the Military Operations Command in the Deir ez-Zor offensive, the tribal groups took the cities of Sabikhan, in the south of Deir ez-Zor, and Muhasan, famous for its anti-Assad uprising in 2011.

On 11 December, the leaders of the Al-Kasrah Military Council, Hajin Military Council, Al-Busayrah Military Council, and Koniko Brigade, announced their defections from the Deir ez-Zor Military Council and the Syrian Democratic Forces to the Syrian transitional government.

=== 2025 ===
On 20 January 2025, gunmen reportedly affiliated with al-Hafl crossed the Euphrates River and launched an attack on SDF checkpoints and headquarters in the towns of Diban and Abu Hamam using rocket-propelled grenades (RPGs). This assault resulted in injuries to three SDF fighters, who were later transported to Omar Military Hospital for medical treatment. A tribal faction led by al-Hafl advocated for an Arab uprising against the SDF. In retaliation, the SDF confronted the tribal fighters with fighters from Al-Hasakah to Deir ez-Zor. By the end of the following day, the SDF had all positions. The subsequent week saw Asayish initiate a security operation that led to multiple arrests.

On 14 August, clashes broke out between the SDF and Syrian Army forces in Deir ez-Zor, amid reports of government armour heading eastwards. Machine guns and mortar fire were reported, injuring some Syrian Army soldiers as well as local fishermen. The pro-government news outlet Enab Baladi reported that one civilian was killed. On the same day the SOHR reported on tribal fighters, led by Abu Hatem Shaqra's 86th Division, which abducted six off-duty SDF fighters in a pharmacy in the town of Gharanij. The following clashes, which included mortar fire coming from government-controlled areas, lead to the death of one tribal fighter and injury of three more, while one SDF vehicle was seized. Two kidnapped members were released later on the same day, while the four others were freed on 16 August. The SDF increased its military presence in the region with over 100 military vehicles and YAT special forces after the events.

On 24 August, the SDF reported that "armed groups affiliated with the Damascus government" launched an attack on a military post of the al-Kasra Military Council in the town of al-Junaynah, Deir ez-Zor's western countryside, violating the ceasefire.

=== 2026 ===
On 17 January, Arab tribal leaders in SDF-held territory in Deir ez-Zor Governorate told Reuters they were ready to take up arms against the Kurdish force if Syria's army issued orders to do so.

On 18 January, tribal forces took control of Raqqa after major clashes, with the Syrian army entering the city after a few hours, and of the Conoco gas field and Omar oil field in eastern Deir ez-Zor, after Arab tribal forces allied to the Syrian government advanced through the regions along the Syria-Iraq border, This was after Arab tribal fighters launched an offensive into the eastern bank of Euphrates and captured the al-Shuhayl and al-Busayrah towns. Local tribal fighters reportedly captured Al-Shaddadah and Markada in Hasakah governorate. Additionally, tribal forces captured 13 villages to the south of the city of Hasakah.

On 20 January, the CJIT-OIR began targeting government aligned tribal fighters with airstrikes around Al-Hawl refugee camp. The SDF managed to repel numerous assaults on Al-Hawl camp and secured its southern perimeter, the Syrian army reportedly deployed to positions that the formerly pro-SDF Shammari tribal fighters seized in northeastern Hasakah Governorate like the Al-Yaarubiyah border crossing with Iraq and Tell Hamis after they defected to the Syrian Ministry of Defense. Syrian and Iraqi media reported that the tribal fighters are members of the Al-Sanadid Forces.

On 22 February, the tribal forces attacked a Syrian transitional government checkpoint in the city of al-Busraya.

On 5 July, the Al-Bobnan and Al-Alaywin families, belonging to the Al-Bafriyo tribe, clashed in the village of Abu Al-Nitel, due to an old vendetta; one young man died and two others were injured in the clash.

On 20 August, SDF commander-in-chief Mazloum Abdi declared that the SDF's integration into the Syrian government had been completed.

== Reactions ==
- United States: The US-led coalition, which supports the SDF, issued a statement urging calm, referring to it as a "distraction" and calling for the end of the clashes.
- Turkey: The Turkish foreign ministry published a statement declaring that they were closely following the conflict, stating the SDF's policies for causing the clashes as "attempts to dominate the ancient peoples of Syria by applying violence and pressure on them and violating their basic human rights". Turkish president Recep Tayyip Erdogan declared support to the Arab tribes, stating: "Deir ez-Zor's true proprietors are the Arab tribes and their actions are a struggle for dignity".

== See also ==
- Deir ez-Zor Governorate campaign
