= Lions of the Ougaidat Brigade =

Militant organization in Syria

- لواء أسود العقيدات
- Founder: Hashim al-Sattam
- Founded: 2021
- Dates active: 2021—2025 (4 years)
- Country: Syria
- Allegiance: Islamic Revolutionary Guard Corps in Deir ez-Zor
- Wars: Syrian civil war; Eastern Syria insurgency; Deir ez-Zor clashes (2023); Arab tribal insurgency in Eastern Syria; Attacks on US bases during the Gaza war

Lions of the Ougaidat Brigade (Arabic: لواء أسود العقيدات), based on the Al-Uqaydat tribe, was an ethnic-Arab Syrian militant group founded in 2021, during the Syrian Civil War, by Hashim al-Sattam. The group operation was ended in 2025 after it surrendered to the new government of Syria.

== History ==
Founded in 2021 by Hashim al-Sattam, the group call themselves part of the Islamic Revolutionary Guard Corps. Financed by Ba'athist Syria, the group participated alongside Arab Tribal and Clan Forces in the 2023 Deir ez-Zor clashes against the Syrian Democratic Forces in Al-Shuhayl.

In August 2024, the group attacked the Syrian Democratic Forces in Gharanij during the Attacks on US bases during the Gaza war.

In 2025, after the fall of the Assad regime the group reached an agreement with Syrian Transitional Government in Damascus to surrender.
