= Arab Tribal and Clan Forces =

Arab militant group

- قوات القبائل والعشائر العربية
- Leader: Ibrahim al-Hifl
- Founded: 25 September 2023
- Dates active: 25 September 2023 – present
- Country: Syria
- Allegiance: Ba'athist Syria (until 2024); Syria (from 2024)
- Headquarters: Deir ez-Zor Governorate; Raqqa Governorate
- Ideology: Arab nationalism Syrian nationalism
- Status: Active
- Wars: Syrian civil war; Eastern Syria insurgency; Arab tribal insurgency in Eastern Syria; Deir ez-Zor clashes (2023); Aftermath of the Syrian civil war; SDF–Syrian transitional government clashes (2025–2026); 2026 northeastern Syria offensive

The Arab Tribal and Clan Forces (Arabic: قوات القبائل والعشائر العربية) is an Arab nationalist insurgent group in Deir ez-Zor Governorate that was established to "liberate the Arab lands."

== History ==
=== Pro-Assad period ===
The Arab Tribal Forces were established by Ibrahim al-Hifl, sheikh of the Ougaidat, in September 2023 with the aim of fighting the Kurdish dominated Syrian Democratic Forces in Deir ez-Zor province. They were supported by Ba'athist Syria. Initially, the tribal forces where exclusively members of the Ougaidat tribe before al-Hifl convinced the Al-Baggara to join him. Tribal forces took over the town of Diban on 25 September using it as a base of operations for further attacks on the SDF.

On 8 August 2024, tribal forces launched attacks from areas controlled by Ba'athist Syria, which resulted in Arab fighters capturing 10 members of the Syrian Democratic Forces. According to the Syrian Observatory for Human Rights, 20 vehicles with members of the Baqir Brigade arrived at the Baqir Brigade headquarters in the Deir ez-Zor neighborhood of Dahiya.

=== Syrian transition period ===
Following the fall of the Assad regime, Arab tribal forces and clans lost one of their financiers. According to a source in Deir ez-Zor, the group allied with the Syrian transitional government against Syrian Democratic Forces along with some Arab defectors.

On 20 January 2025, tribal forces launched an attack on SDF checkpoints, injuring three SDF fighters.

On 14 August 2025, clashes erupted between the SDF and Arab Tribal and Clan Forces insurgents; a member of the Forces was killed, three others injured and six SDF members were captured.

On 18 January 2026, tribal forces took control of Raqqa after major clashes, with the Syrian army entering the city after a few hours. This was after Arab tribal fighters launched an offensive into the eastern bank of Euphrates and captured the al-Shuhayl and al-Busayrah towns. The local tribal fighters reportedly captured Al-Shaddadah and Markada in Hasakah governorate.
