= Deir ez-Zor clashes (2023) =

Escalation of violence in eastern Syria

- Part of the Eastern Syria insurgency in the Syrian Civil War
Date	First series of clashes: 27 August 2023 – 7 September 2023 (1 week and 3 days); Second series of clashes: 25–27 September 2023
Location	Deir ez-Zor Governorate, Syria
Result	SDF victory
Territorial changes	DZMC military units and tribal fighters temporarily capture towns and villages in eastern Deir-Ez-Zor; SDF launches counter-offensive and retakes towns of al-Sabha, al-Busayrah, al-Shuhayl, al-Hawaij, al-Dhiban by 7 September; Ceasefire established between SDF and Arab tribes; SDF forces enter remaining areas of Deir ez-Zor after negotiations

Belligerents
Autonomous Administration of North and East Syria (AANES): Syrian Democratic Forces (SDF); Deir ez-Zor Military Council loyalists Pro-SDF Arab clans of Deir ez-Zor; United States	Deir ez-Zor Military Council rebels Anti-SDF Arab clans of Deir ez-Zor: Arab Tribal and Clan Forces; Al-Uqaydat "Akidat" confederation; al-Bakir; Al-Shaitat; Lions of the Ougaidat Brigade; Hashemite Tribes Regiment; Dulaim; Albu Khabur; Some al-Baggara factions; Syrian government loyalists

Commanders and leaders
Mazloum Abdi	Ibrahim Al-Hifl (Al Uqaydat sheikh); Amir al-Bashir (al-Baggara sheikh); Adham (Rashid Abu Khawla's brother) Nawaf al-Bashir (Ousoud al-Ashiyer leader)

Units involved
Syrian Democratic Forces; People's Defense Units (YPG); Women's Protection Units (YPJ); Northern Democratic Brigade; Hêzên Komandos; DZMC military units; Internal Security Forces; United States Air Force	DZMC military units Local tribal forces Pro-government militias: Liwa al-Quds; "Ousoud al-Ashiyer" militia; Zidan Al-Halloush's militia; Ahmed Al-Rayes's militia

Strength
Thousands	Unknown

Casualties and losses
29 killed	79 killed
- 10 civilians killed

Starting on 27 August 2023, an escalation of violence occurred across Deir ez-Zor Governorate in eastern Syria. The clashes began after the Syrian Democratic Forces (SDF), which is the military force of the Autonomous Administration of North and East Syria (AANES) arrested the military commander of Deir ez-Zor Military Council known by the name of Abu Khawla, accusing him of corruption and unlawful activity. Abu Khawla has the support of some Arab tribes in Deir Ez-Zor. The arrest led to a spiraling cycle of violence that escalated when tribal gunmen launched an offensive against the SDF in the region. As a result of the ongoing clashes, tribal fighters managed to take control of some towns and villages. However, a counterattack by the SDF regained control of all lost areas by 7 September 2023. The SDF officially termed the counter-attack Operation Security Reinforcement. Another, short-lived rebellion took place from 25 to 27 September, inspired by an attack by pro-Syrian government militias from across the Euphrates; this uprising was quickly defeated by the SDF.

The clashes have resulted in 118 people being killed across northeastern Syria.

== Background ==
The Deir ez-Zor Military Council (DZMC) is a constituent military council of the SDF, formed in 2016 to fight the Islamic State in the Northern Raqqa offensive and subsequent Deir ez-Zor campaign. It maintains a presence in the portion of Deir ez-Zor Governorate controlled by the SDF east of the Euphrates, which was incorporated into the Kurdish-dominated Autonomous Administration of North and East Syria. Policies imposed by the SDF have been unpopular with parts of the Arab-majority population of the region, in which Sunni Arab tribes wield significant sociopolitical power.

Though some grievances are social and political in nature, as the local tribes disapproved of the AANES' gender equality policies and the garrisoning of Kurdish troops in the region, others were economic. Many local AANES and SDF representatives were corrupt, and poverty was widespread. Arab tribal representatives have denounced the SDF of stealing the oil resources in the region and using its wealth to finance Kurdish-majority regions.

The SDF and DMC have maintained a frayed relationship. DZMC's leader Abu Khawla has been accused of serious misconduct and criminal activity. An attempt by the SDF to oust the DMC's chief, Abu Khawla, was blocked by the US in 2018, while a planned arrest in July 2023 was abandoned after a stand-off. Several members of the DMZC has criticized SDF for discriminating against the Arab populations in the locality.

In June 2023, The Washington Post revealed that a leaked classified US intelligence assessment described plans by Iran, Syria and Russia to instigate a popular uprising against US forces based in the region, as part of a wider campaign to expel them. Officials from the three countries formed a "coordination center" for this purpose in November 2022.

By August 2023, the SDF was mobilizing forces east of the Euphrates, ostensibly to deter an attack by Iranian and Syrian forces who were amassing on the west bank of the river. The Syrian Observatory for Human Rights reported that the SDF moved 500 armored vehicles to the area from Hasakah. The SDF denied reports of a military build-up, stating that their presence was intended to "eliminate" Islamic State cells operating in the region.

== Clashes ==
On 27 August 2023, clashes broke out between the Syrian Democratic Forces (SDF) and Arab tribes in Deir-Ez-Zor. A significant number of these tribe members were also prominent leaders in Deir ez-Zor Military Council (DMC). The clashes broke out after the SDF arrested and dismissed Abu Khawla. The rebellion was reportedly started by a DMC commander, Jalal Al-Khabil, in an attempt to put pressure on the SDF to release Abu Khawla. Around the same time, the AANES' Internal Security Forces arrested the manager of the local Baz press agency. Together, these events led to rapidly escalating unrest. An Arab tribal alliance consisting of al-Shuhayl, al-Dulaim, al-Bakir and Albu Khabur tribes launched the armed uprising; across nineteen locations. Dissident members of the Deir ez-Zor Military Council joined the rebels, with Rashid's brother Adham becoming a leader of the insurgents. Meanwhile, the pro-Syrian government militia "Ousoud al-Ashiyer", led by Nawaf al-Bashir, called on the rebels to defect to the Syrian government. On 31 August, "Ousoud al-Ashiyer" attempted to cross the Euphrates from government-held areas to join the Deir ez-Zor rebellion. This attempted incursion was fended off by the SDF and by the United States Air Force. Around the same time, clashes erupted at Jadid Ekaydat; the SDF stormed the village, and was resisted not just by ex-DMC fighters but also Syrian government loyalists including members of Liwa al-Quds, Zidan Al-Halloush's militia, and Ahmed Al-Rayes's militia.

During the clashes, the SDF reportedly managed to take control of town of Ezba. As more reports of SDF counter-attacks and a number of abuses emerged, Arab tribes of Akidat and Shaytat also joined the coalition. Chief of al Uqaydat "Akidat" confederation, Shaykh Ibrahim al-Hifl, published a statement in 30 August urging all tribes in the region to join the uprising. While some factions of Baggara tribe clashed with SDF fighters, its leadership positioned themselves as neutral, pressing for ceasefire and negotiations with SDF. To put down the growing rebellion, the SDF sent thousands of fresh troops from other parts of northern Syria, including many Arab SDF fighters and Women's Protection Units (YPJ) troops. The involvement of the SDF female troops was seen an insult by supporters of the rebels, with one tribal elder stating "They put them in our hometown just to send a message that our women will get you".

As of 1 September 2023, the clashes resulted in 45 people being killed, including 25 tribesmen, 11 SDF fighters, and 5 civilians. Another four were killed in a related raid by SDF. Local sources reported that by 1 September, pro-DMC tribal fighters had managed to seize control of 24 villages and numerous settlements, after expelling SDF fighters from the eastern countryside of Deir ez-Zor.

On the same day, tribal fighters with origins in the Deir ez-Zor region launched an attack against SDF-controlled positions in the Manbij District from areas controlled by the Turkish-backed Syrian National Army. The fighters reportedly captured three villages including al-Muhsinli and Arab Hassan, although there were later claims that they withdrew due to artillery fire. They had also allegedly captured two villages in northwestern Aleppo under the control of the Syrian government but later withdrew from the villages after coming under heavy shelling and Russian airstrikes.

By 3 September, the SDF had re-taken territory up to the town of Al-Dhiban following fighting in al-Basira, al-Sabha, and al-Suheil, though the former remained in the hands of Sheikh Ibrahim al-Hafel of the al Uqaydat confederation from which Abu Khawla derives.

By 4 September, Al-Dhiban was the last major stronghold of the rebels, though some remnant anti-SDF forces operated in other areas. On the next day, the SDF advanced into al-Dhiban and retook about 40% of it. The SDF also captured Hawaij Thiban and advanced toward Al-Tayanah, where other rebels held out. On 6 September, the SDF fully captured Al-Dhiban, after the Al Uqaydat leadership agreed to a deal with the AANES to "save face". The exact fate of the rebellion's main leader, Sheikh Ibrahim Al-Hifl, was initially unclear, but it was confirmed that he had fled from Al-Dhiban.

Following the battle of Dhiban, the most fierce fight in the clashes, Arab tribes entered into negotiations with SDF, during which an agreement was struck to permit the entry of SDF military in the remaining regions. In an interview with Reuters on 7 September, SDF chief Mazloum Abdi stated that "general amnesty" would be provided to all rebel fighters and also claimed SDF would release all detainees. Abdi further admitted flaws in the Kurdish-dominated administration and asserted that civil councils in the region would be re-structured to meet local demands and to prevent discrimination against Arabs. He also stated that SDF sought to re-assert control over the region in an "even stronger way".

By 8 September, SDF had established control over the region between al-Tayyanah and Baghouz. This marked SDF's recapture of all territories in the eastern Deir ez-Zor region, since the eruption of the armed uprising in 27 August.

=== Negotiations and renewed fighting ===
Following the entry of SDF troops into the areas of uprising, the leadership of SDF has demanded the handing over of weaponry, disbanding of all armed units affiliated with the Deir ez-Zor Military Council; in addition to the dissolution of DZMC. Objectives of SDF include the potential dissolution of the autonomous DZMC and centralization of all pro-SDF forces present in North-eastern Syria under the AANES administration. Another goal is the break-up of the local administration and incorporation of the region into the direct political control of AANES.

On 25 September, Iranian-backed militias launched an incursion into the areas previously affected by the tribal revolt. They received support by several local armed tribesmen, and took control of parts of Dhiban. Ibrahim al-Hifl publicly declared a "new battle" by the Arab tribes against the SDF. The SDF declared a curfew from al-Shuhayl to al-Baghuz. By 27 September, the SDF had defeated the militias and retaken the area.

On 29 October, the Army of Tribes and Clans in Deir ez-Zor has launched a broad offensive against positions held by the Syrian Democratic Forces (SDF) in the outskirts of Deir ez-Zor.

== International reaction ==
The US-led coalition, which supports the SDF, issued a statement urging calm, referring to it as a "distraction" and calling for the end of the clashes. The United States ultimately helped to mediate a deal between the rebel tribes and the AANES.

The Turkish foreign ministry published a statement declaring that they were closely following the conflict, stating the SDF's policies for causing the clashes as "attempts to dominate the ancient peoples of Syria by applying violence and pressure on them and violating their basic human rights". Turkish president Recep Tayyip Erdogan declared support to the Arab tribes, stating: "Deir e-Zour's true proprietors are the Arab tribes and their actions are a struggle for dignity".
