= 2026 northeastern Syria offensive =

Offensive spearheaded by the Syrian government

- Part of the SDF–Syrian transitional government clashes (2025–2026), the Arab tribal insurgency in Eastern Syria of the Aftermath of the Syrian civil war
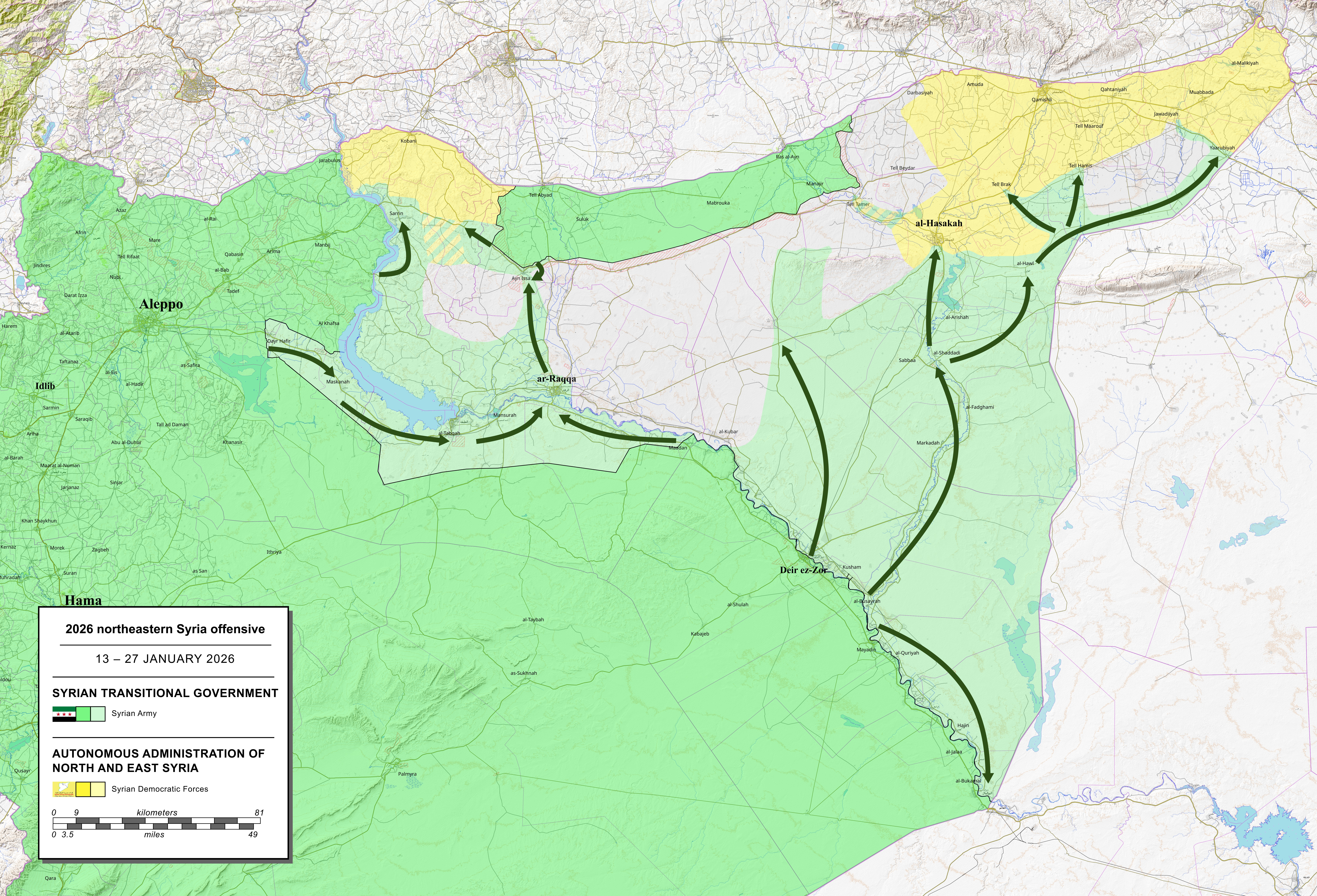
- Military situation in northeastern Syria on 20 January, prior to the ceasefire
Date	13 – 30 January 2026 (2 weeks and 3 days)
Location	Northeastern Syria: Aleppo Governorate; Raqqa Governorate; Deir ez-Zor Governorate; Al-Hasakah Governorate
Result	Syrian government victory; ceasefire
Territorial changes	Syrian government forces capture Dayr Hafir, Maskanah, Al-Tabqah, Al-Hawl, Al-Yaarubiyah, Tell Hamis, Khatuniyah, Sarrin, the eastern Deir ez-Zor countryside and parts of Raqqa; Raqqa and Deir ez-Zor Governorates are ceded to the Syrian transitional government as part of a ceasefire agreement

Belligerents
(Syria) Syrian transitional government Supported by: Turkey Arab Tribal and Clan Forces	Democratic Autonomous Administration of North and East Syria Kurdistan Workers' Party (claimed by Syrian transitional government and Turkey)

Commanders and leaders
Ahmed al-Sharaa; Murhaf Abu Qasra; Ali Noureddine al-Naasan; Anwar al-Saleh al-Hamoud; Anas Khattab	Mazloum Abdi; Ferhad Şamî; Sipan Hamo Bahoz Erdal (per Syrian transitional government and Turkey)

Units involved
(Syria) Syrian Armed Forces; (Syria) Syrian Army; (Syria) 60th Division; (Syria) 66th Division; (Syria) 72nd Division; (Syria) 76th Division; (Syria) 80th Division; Ministry of Interior; General Security Service; Arab Tribal forces; al-Buhamad clan; Al-Uqaydat; Al-Busraya; Al-Baggara; Shammar tribes; Al-Sanadid Forces	Syrian Democratic Forces; People's Defense Units; Women's Protection Units; Şehid Ayaz Battalion; Martyr Haroun Units; Military Councils; Asayish; Raqqa Internal Security Forces

Casualties and losses
- c. 1,000 combatants killed overall 152 civilians killed and 322 injured (as of 18 January)

On 13 January 2026, the Syrian transitional government launched an offensive against the Kurdish-led Syrian Democratic Forces (SDF) in the territories of the Democratic Autonomous Administration of North and East Syria (DAANES). Initially focused on eastern Aleppo, around the towns of Deir Hafer and Maskanah, the offensive expanded on 17 January to the governorates of Raqqa, Deir ez-Zor and Al-Hasakah.

On 18 January, Syrian President Ahmed al-Sharaa unilaterally announced a 14-point ceasefire agreement with the SDF, negotiated through the US envoy Tom Barrack, under which the SDF is set to be integrated into the Syrian government, and the governorates of Raqqa and Deir ez-Zor immediately handed over to the government, together with the administration of prisoner-of-war camps for Islamic State members, all border crossings and oil fields. The SDF commander-in-chief Mazloum Abdi acknowledged the agreement later that day, saying that he would visit Damascus to discuss the deal. Clashes persisted the next day, with both sides accusing the other of violating the ceasefire. Media outlets reported that the meeting between Abdi and al-Sharaa had gone poorly, with no agreement being reached.

On 20 January, the Syrian government announced a ceasefire, starting at 20:00 local time. The Syrian army would not enter the city centres of al-Hasakah and Qamishli or Kurdish villages. Sharaa granted the SDF four days to work out an integration plan. On 24 January, after initial disclaimers, the Syrian government declared a 15-day extension of the ceasefire, effective from 23:00 local time, to support the US operation to transfer Islamic State detainees from SDF prisons to Iraq. On 30 January, the government announced that it had reached a comprehensive agreement with the SDF, which includes a ceasefire, gradual military and administrative integration, and the deployment of Interior Ministry forces in al-Hasakah and Qamishli.

On 20 August, during the centenary celebrations of the city of Qamishli, SDF Commander-in-Chief Mazloum Abdi declared that the integration of the military, security, and administrative institutions into the Syrian state had been completed and that non-Syrian fighters affiliated with the SDF had withdrawn. However, other media reported that Abdi stopped short of announcing the SDF's dissolution and that issues such as the integration of the Women's Protection Units remained unresolved. Alongside this, the Democratic Autonomous Administration of North and East Syria (DAANES) was fully integrated into the Syrian state following the January 2026 northeastern Syria offensive by government forces, which led to up to 80% of the DAANES's territory being captured and subsequently ceded to the Syrian government as part of an integration agreement; the integration agreement culminated in the assimilation of DAANES into the Syrian transitional government.

On 25 August, Abdi announced the complete dissolution of the SDF as part of the integration plan.

== Background ==
In December 2024, an offensive spearheaded by the Turkish-sponsored Hay'at Tahrir al-Sham (HTS) ended with the fall of the Assad regime and brought the HTS emir Ahmed al-Sharaa to power as president of Syria in January 2025. During the second administration of Donald Trump, which also began in January 2025, the United States accepted Syria as part of a Turkish sphere of influence, while Trump renewed efforts to withdraw US troops from the country. The "new era" in US–Turkish relations was marked by an increased US sympathy to Turkish complaints against the Syrian Democratic Forces (SDF) and by the appointment of Tom Barrack as the US ambassador to Turkey and Syria, assumed in May 2025. In May 2025, during a visit to Saudi Arabia, Trump lifted the US economic sanctions against Syria.

Representatives of the Syrian Democratic Forces were not invited to the Syrian National Dialogue Conference of late February 2025, called by the Syrian transitional government of President Ahmed al-Sharaa as a consultative measure for the provisional Constitutional Declaration of the Syrian Arab Republic that was ratified on 13 March 2025. On 10 March 2025, following a three-month offensive by Turkey and Turkish-backed Syrian National Army against the SDF, the Syrian transitional government and the SDF signed an agreement concerning the integration of the SDF into Syrian state institutions, whose implementation was delayed by further negotiations and fighting. The SDF continued to push for the federalization of Syria and presided over a gathering of Syria's minorities in al-Hasakah in August 2025. The conference's call for amending the transitional constitution drew condemnation from Damascus.

The territory controlled by DAANES was excluded by the Syrian transitional government from the parliamentary selection process in October 2025, with the allocated seats remaining empty, although in December 2025 Sharaa's electoral commission decided to appoint subcommittees to conduct the selection process in "some areas" of the Al-Hasakah and Raqqa governorates. In November 2025, while hosting Sharaa in Washington, D.C., Trump admitted Syria to the Global Coalition to Counter the Islamic State of Iraq and the Levant, undermining SDF's position as the US strategic ally in the country.

On 4 January 2026, an SDF delegation led by the commander-in-chief Mazloum Abdi met Syrian officials in Damascus for a new round of talks on integration per the March 2025 agreement. Brigadier General Kevin J. Lambert, the commander of the Combined Joint Task Force – Operation Inherent Resolve (CJTF-OIR), took part in the discussions per SDF media; it was not clear whether the Syrian president Ahmed al-Sharaa was personally involved. Both sides announced that further talks would follow. The form of the agreed integration remained contested, with Damascus demanding individual absorption of SDF fighters into existing Syrian Army units. The government issued no official statement about the meeting, whereas the Syrian state television alleged that the meeting delivered no "tangible results" regarding the implementation of the existing agreement. According to the Kurdish side, the meeting achieved "a positive outcome" but was terminated abruptly by the Syrian foreign minister Asaad al-Shaibani.

On 5 and 6 January, Syria's foreign minister al-Shaibani and General Intelligence Service director Hussein al-Salama met in Paris for a round of talks, mediated by the US Special Envoy to Syria Tom Barrack, with representatives of Israel, which had invaded Syria in 2024: ambassador to the US Yechiel Leiter, Prime Minister Benjamin Netanyahu's military secretary Roman Gofman and acting national security adviser Gil Reich. Under US guidance, the sides made first steps towards a projected broad security and economic cooperation pact similar to the 1994 Israel–Jordan peace treaty that would eventually see the restoration of Golan Heights to Syria. The Syrian officials presented a plan to recapture some territory from the SDF, which they had previously accused Israel of backing, and met with no objection from the Israelis, despite Barrack's previous belief that Israel favoured Syria's division into cantons for strategic reasons. The Syrians also received from Turkey an assurance of American approval for their operation against the SDF, on the condition that "Kurdish civilians were protected".

On 6 January, the Syrian transitional government launched an offensive to capture the Kurdish inhabited Sheikh Maqsood neighbourhood of Aleppo. Following days of clashes the Syrian army and SDF reached a ceasefire agreement on 10 January, under which the SDF withdrew from the neighborhood to northeastern Syria.

Before the larger operations took place, on 16 January, Syrian president Ahmed al-Sharaa issued a decree in an attempt to ease tensions with the SDF, declaring the Kurds as a "basic part of Syrian people", also declaring Kurdish as a national language, and granting further rights to the Kurdish minority. On 28 January, Syrian Interior Minister Anas Khattab ordered the immediate implementation of a decree covering those who were formerly stateless, annulled the 1962 Hasakah census measures, and set 5 February 2026 as the deadline to finalize the process.

== Offensive ==
=== Eastern Aleppo offensive ===
On 13 January, the Syrian army declared Maskanah and Deir Hafer as "closed military zones", accusing the SDF of regrouping in the area and using Iranian-made drones to launch attacks against civilians in Aleppo. The SDF reportedly destroyed three bridges linking SDF-controlled areas with government-held territory east of Aleppo. The Syrian army claimed that it had thwarted an attempt by the SDF to mine and blow up a bridge linking the villages of Rasm al-Imam and Rasm al-Krum, near Deir Hafer. On 14 January, the Syrian Army's Operations Authority announced the opening of a humanitarian corridor, that crosses Deir Hafer toward Hamima, controlled by the Syrian government forces and added that clashes occurred near the Tishrin Dam, the SDF repelled an assault in the city of Zubayda. On 15 January, the SDF closed the Tabqa, Raqqa and Deir ez-Zor border crossings with the Syrian government, "until further notice".

On 16 January, SDF commander-in-chief, Mazloum Abdi said on the social media website X that the SDF would withdraw from Deir Hafer on 17 January, that this step came "based on calls from friendly countries and mediators, and our demonstration of good faith in completing the merger process and commitment to implementing the terms of the March 10 agreement." Reportedly on the same day, six members of the SDF deserted to the Syrian government forces. The SDF repelled an attack on Tishrin Dam, claiming 10 tanks destroyed, the SOHR later confirmed two. The SDF repulsed numerous attacks near the Sarrin countryside.

=== Raqqa and Deir ez-Zor offensives ===
On 17 January, following mediation from the US, the SDF withdrew from Deir Hafer and Maskanah, with the Syrian army entering the towns a few hours later. Local people greeted the Syrian army. Later, the SDF reported clashes in Dibsi Afnan, following a "betrayal" by the Syrian government forces and a violation of the agreement. Arab tribal leaders in SDF-held territory in Deir ez-Zor Governorate told Reuters they were ready to take up arms against the Kurdish force if the Syrian army issued orders to do so.

The SDF accused the Syrian army of violating the withdrawal agreement by attacking its forces during its withdrawal. Two Syrian army soldiers were killed by the SDF in the ensuing clashes. In response, the Syrian government declared the territory west of the Euphrates, which was under SDF control, as a 'closed military zone', including the areas of southern Raqqa governorate with the city of Tabqa. After the exacerbated tensions, the Syrian army began attacking areas of Tabqa Canton.

On 18 January, Syrian government forces captured Al-Tabqah, Euphrates Dam and the Tabqa Airbase. Additionally, Syrian army captured the entire eastern Deir ez-Zor countryside, along with all its town and villages, as well as the oil and gas fields located in the region including the Al-Omar field, the country's largest, and the Conoco gas field. State-run Syrian Arab News Agency (SANA) has reported that SDF has blown up a bridge connecting Raqqa and positions south of it, also cutting the water supply. At around noon, tribal forces took control of Raqqa after major clashes, with the Syrian army entering the city after a few hours.

An Associated Press journalist in the area said that local residents greeted the large military convoys of the Syrian transitional government that entered Raqqa, after the withdrawal of SDF forces from the city. Syrian military forces also took control of the oil fields in Raqqa, and of the Conoco gas field and Omar oil field in eastern Deir ez-Zor, after Arab tribal forces allied to the Syrian government advanced through the regions along the Syria-Iraq border. This was after Arab tribal fighters launched an offensive into the eastern bank of Euphrates and captured the al-Shuhayl and al-Busayrah towns.

The SDF repelled an attack by Syrian government forces in the village of Saida, in the rural area of Ayn Issa, while local tribal fighters reportedly captured Al-Shaddadah and Markada in Hasakah governorate. Additionally, tribal forces captured 13 villages to the south of the city of Hasakah.

On 20 January, the CJIT-OIR began targeting government aligned tribal fighters with airstrikes around Al-Hawl refugee camp. The SDF managed to repel numerous assaults on Al-Hawl camp and secured its southern perimeter, but later withdrew from the area, citing "international indifference" towards the issue of ISIS prisoners. The Syrian army reportedly deployed to positions that the formerly pro-SDF Shammari tribal fighters seized in northeastern Hasakah Governorate like the Al-Yaarubiyah border crossing with Iraq and Tell Hamis after they defected to the Syrian Ministry of Defense. Syrian and Iraqi media reported that the tribal fighters are members of the Al-Sanadid Forces. Syrian forces also captured the Qara Qozak bridge and Sarrin, near Kobani.

Local sources reported that Syrian Forces took control three villages near Mount Abdulaziz in western Hasakah Governorate on 20 January without SDF resistance. Local sources separately reported that Syrian Forces took control of at least five villages north of the Qara Qozak Bridge without SDF resistance on 21 January. The MoD also advanced from Tal Hamis to take control of Tell Brak in Hasakah Governorate after the SDF withdrew from its positions there on 21 January.

== Ceasefire ==
=== Erbil meeting and initial talks (17 January) ===
On 17 January, a meeting was held in Erbil in the Kurdistan Region of Iraq between the US Special Envoy to Syria Tom Barrack and the Kurdish representatives, which included the SDF commander-in-chief Mazloum Abdi, head of foreign relations of the Democratic Autonomous Administration of North and East Syria Îlham Ehmed, Kurdish National Council president Mihemed Ismail and Masoud Barzani. According to the Syrian Foreign Ministry spokesperson, the purpose of the meeting was to communicate the new accord reached between the United States and the Syrian government. During the meeting, Abdi accused Barrack of failing to honour pledges that Kurds would be allowed to administer Kurdish-majority areas, and that the SDF would be integrated as a brigade-sized formation at the least and stationed in the northeast. Barrack in turn criticised Abdi for delaying the implementation of the integration agreement signed in March 2025, and accused him of attempting to involve Israel in the conflict. Masoud Barzani asked Barrack to arrange a follow-up meeting between Abdi and the Syrian president Sharaa, and offered to "guarantee" the resulting agreement.

Barrack then travelled to Damascus and early on 18 January concluded an agreement with Sharaa that stipulated a ceasefire, integration of the SDF into the Syrian Army, and the establishment of Syrian government control over the three provinces administered by the SDF since the Syrian civil war. In Raqqa Governorate, Abdul Rahman Salama was appointed governor on 19 January. The governor of Aleppo, Azzam al-Gharib, announced the appointment, stating that Salama had assumed the position of governor of Raqqa.

=== Damascus agreement and ceasefire (18 January) ===
Syrian president Ahmed al-Sharaa announced the 14-point agreement on the ceasefire and the integration of the Syrian Democratic Forces (SDF), which was signed by SDF Commander-in-chief Mazloum Abdi, 18 January 2026. (Note: Abdi put an electronic signature to the deal.)

On 18 January, the US military issued a public call for Syrian troops to stop advancing, which went unheeded. Later that day, Al-Sharaa publicised the 14-point agreement, which appeared to have been signed separately by Abdi and by himself, in his own press statement, announcing the entry of the Syrian Army into the three provinces. The Syrian Army then declared a nationwide ceasefire. Abdi subsequently acknowledged the deal and confirmed the withdrawal of the SDF from the governorates of Raqqa and Deir ez-Zor. Al-Sharaa and Abdi confirmed their intention to meet on 19 January in Damascus to discuss further details; al-Sharaa stated that Abdi's visit (Note: According to a Russian news agency, Mazloum Abdi had been offered the governorship of the Al-Hasakah Governorate as part of an invitation to visit Damascus on 18 January.) had been delayed by weather.

The terms of the ceasefire deal gave the Syrian transitional government immediate military and administrative control of the Deir ez-Zor Governorate and Raqqa Governorate. In addition, all civilian institutions in Al-Hasakah Governorate were to be integrated into the Syrian state structures. Across northeastern Syria, Damascus was to assume control of all oil and gas fields, international border crossings, and prisoner-of-war camps for Islamic State members established by the SDF. The agreement also stipulated that the SDF would be integrated into the Syrian Army on an individual basis, and obliged the SDF to expel non-Syrian members affiliated with the Kurdistan Worker's Party (PKK) from the Syrian territory (a point welcomed by Turkey) and to provide lists of Ba'athist officers present in the region. Other provisions foresaw a "dignified" return of refugees to the Afrin Region and the Sheikh Maqsood neighbourhood in Aleppo, a demilitarisation of Kobani, and a ban on recruitment of Ba'athist elements into the SDF leadership.

On 18 January, the SDF withdrew east of the Euphrates, leaving also the al-Omar oil field on its eastern bank. The Syrian Army then seized the evacuated areas. Abdi's post-ceasefire meeting with al-Sharaa in Damascus on 19 January failed to produce any results, with Al-Monitor reporting that al-Sharaa had made new demands, including the handover of Al-Hasakah Governorate. The outlet also reported that Syrian Kurdish officials believe that Turkey had pressured al-Sharaa into making further demands beyond those outlined in the agreement signed on 18 January. Not long after the meeting, president of the United States Donald Trump held a phone call with al-Sharaa, demanded an end to fighting, and apparently obtained a commitment from al-Sharaa not to enter al-Hasakah, which his troops were advancing on.

Hostilities went on throughout the day. In the early hours, the Syrian Army entered al-Shaddadah in the al-Hasakah Governorate. Clashes broke out between the SDF and Syrian government forces near the city's prison, which housed thousands of Islamic State prisoners of war. Fighting also took place for the prison of al-Aqtan in the city of Raqqa and, according to the SDF, in Ain Issa in the Raqqa Governorate. The city of al-Shaddadah along with its prison was captured by the Syrian Army. The SDF accused Turkey of launching a drone attack on al-Hasakah late on 19 January. The SDF claimed that 1,500 ISIS fighters had escaped from Al-Shaddadah prison. A US official said that 200 low-level ISIS fighters had escaped from al-Shaddadi prison after SDF left the facility, adding that many of the escapees had been re-captured by the Syrian Army.

=== Second ceasefire and negotiations (20–22 January) ===
On 20 January, the Syrian government proclaimed a new ceasefire agreement, temporarily committing its troops to stay out of the city centres of Hasakah and Qamishli or Kurdish villages in the Hasakah province. The SDF was given a four-day consultation period to develop a "practical mechanism" for integration of the areas remaining under its control. Sharaa then reiterated his guarantees for Kurdish "national, political and civil rights" in Syria to ex-president of the Kurdistan Region Masoud Barzani, who in his turn expressed support for the new ceasefire agreement. Barrack stated on X that the US does not endorse federalism (Note: According to a Syrian source, US president Trump wanted a single interlocutor in the country.) and acknowledged that individual incorporation of SDF members into the Syrian Army "remained among the most contentious issues". Mazloum Abdi announced that the SDF had fallen back to Kurdish-majority areas in Kobani and al-Hasakah province, and declared that protecting those areas would be a "red line" in continued negotiations with the government. Saying they would not carry out military actions unless government forces attacked them first, the SDF declared they were ready to implement the 18 January agreement. However, the SDF claimed that government-aligned forces were shelling its positions shortly after the ceasefire came into effect.

The SDF handed control of Qamishli and Hasakah to the Shammar, an Arab tribe with good relations with the SDF. The SDF and Syrian government have worked out a timeline for the implementation of the agreement. Dutch journalist Wladimir van Wilgenburg reported that Kobani has been besieged by the Syrian government, with water and electricity being cut.

On 21 January, DAANES foreign relations head Îlham Ehmed sent a letter to the United Nations Security Council ahead of its meeting on the next day, in which she complained of unilateral ceasefire violations by the government and asked for a formal negotiation process to be established under a United Nations special envoy with the participation of interested states.

As of 22 January, two days into the ceasefire, clashes were reported by the United Nations to continue in various areas of the Al-Hasakah Governorate and around Kobani. Local SDF units claimed to have repelled an attack by the Syrian Army outside Sarrin, south of Kobani. On the same day, Abdi and Ehmed met with Barrack, CENTCOM commander Admiral Brad Cooper and President of the Kurdistan Region Nechirvan Barzani in Erbil to discuss extending the truce. Following the meeting, Admiral Cooper came to Syria to "contain the situation" and ensure that the government forces had implemented the ceasefire as a prerequisite for the US transfer of over 7,000 IS prisoners to Iraq.

=== Ceasefire extensions and tensions (23–25 January) ===
On 23 January, the SDF said the ceasefire deadline could be extended but the Syrian government denied this was under discussion. Turkish foreign minister Hakan Fidan suggested that the ceasefire should continue while the US is transferring Islamic State prisoners from detention facilities in north-east Syria to Iraq, a process to be completed in a matter of days. On the same day, the Syrian government took over control of the al-Aqtan prison in Raqqa from the SDF, after crowds of civilians had tried to storm the facility, and allowed for the safe passage of 800 SDF troops and civilians to the besieged Kobani, in a concession obtained from President Sharaa by the CENTCOM "as a measure to cool things down" while the IS prisoners are moved to Iraq. Russia moved troops from the Khmeimim Air Base in Latakia to its outpost at the Qamishli International Airport.

On 24 January, the SDF claimed to hold a frontline 20 km away from al-Hasakah. A prolongation of the ceasefire was reported ahead of its expiry on 24 January, with unauthorised sources in Damascus suggesting a maximum duration of one month and the DAANES claiming to have already submitted its integration proposal through Barrack. The Ministry of Foreign Affairs and Expatriates then dismissed the circulating reports as inaccurate, while describing the deadline as referring to "the future of al-Hasakah province". It also denied receiving a "positive response" to government proposals. Assistant Foreign Minister for Arab Affairs Mohammed Taha al-Ahmed accused the SDF of seeking truces to gain time and spreading rumors of deadline extensions while failing to respond to government proposals and nominate candidates for senior positions offered by Damascus. He noted that Damascus had no broad objection to SDF figures taking government roles. The SDF accused the government of preparing a further escalation in a "systematic manner" and claimed to have observed "military build-ups and logistical movements". On 24 January at 23:00 local time, the Syrian Ministry of Defense announced a 15-day extension to the ceasefire to support the US transfer of IS prisoners to Iraq.

On 25 January, the SDF issued a statement accusing "Damascus factions" of breaching the ceasefire with "serious and repeated violations against populated areas in the Jazira and Kobani regions", and asked agreement guarantors to intervene without delay. It reported an armored attack on al-Chalabiyah near Kobani, shelling of al-Qasimiyah near Kobani that killed a child, a suicide drone attack near Girkê Legê, and attacks against three other villages; four SDF fighters and three civilians were said to have been wounded. The Syrian Arab News Agency reported single SDF artillery hits in the villages of al-Jamal near Jarabulus and al-Hawi west of the Euphrates, without casualties.

=== Comprehensive deal and implementation (30 January–25 August) ===
On 30 January, the Syrian government announced that it had reached a comprehensive agreement with the SDF, including a ceasefire, gradual military and administrative integration, the deployment of Interior Ministry forces in al-Hasakah and Qamishli, the integration of local institutions into the state, guarantees of civil and educational rights for the Kurdish community, and the return of displaced persons. On 2 February, the General Security Service forces began deploying in al-Hasakah to implement the agreement signed between the SDF and the Syrian government. The next day, the Syrian Ministry of Interior said its units began entering the city of Qamishli in Hasakah to implement the agreement. President Ahmed al-Sharaa met with a delegation from the Kurdish National Council at the People's Palace in Damascus.

On 4 February, the SDF's head of public relations, Noureddin Issa Ahmed, was appointed governor of Al-Hasakah Governorate. His appointment was officially confirmed by al-Sharaa on 13 February after a presidential decree was issued. The SDF previously nominated Issa Ahmed for the position as part of an agreement with the Syrian government on the region's administration. On 6 February, a Syrian Defense Ministry delegation, led by Brigadier General Hamza al-Hmaidi, met with SDF representatives in Hasakah to discuss the integration of SDF personnel into the Syrian Army and the implementation of the remaining terms of their agreement. On the same day, an Operations Command delegation, along with senior Syrian Army officers, met with the SDF and toured several sites in Hasakah to begin implementing the agreement. On 10 February, units of the Syrian Army began withdrawing from the outskirts of al-Hasakah under the agreement with the SDF, while monitoring continues for the next phase.

On 13 February, Syrian Foreign Minister Asaad al-Shaibani and SDF Commander-in-Chief Mazloum Abdi met US Secretary of State Marco Rubio on the sidelines of the Munich Security Conference. The meeting marked one of the highest-level encounters between the two Syrian leaders and a US official since the war in areas held by Kurdish-majority forces ended with an integration agreement. The Syrian Arab News Agency reported that the meeting addressed "key local and regional developments, with an emphasis on Syria's unity, sovereignty and territorial integrity." On 21 February, the Media Directorate at the Presidency of the Republic announced that Brigadier General Ziad al-Ayesh had been appointed as a presidential envoy for implementing the 30 January agreement with the SDF and overseeing the integration process. Also, on 21 February, Îlham Ehmed, a senior official of the Kurdish administration in northeast Syria, said that the agreement with the government was not being implemented and warned of a "renewed war" following the ceasefire. On 22 February, Major general Ali Noureddine al-Naasan met with a delegation from the SDF to discuss steps for integrating SDF units into several brigades of the Syrian Army, while the Ministry of Defense stated that the meeting also addressed military deployment and administrative arrangements.

On 27 February, the Syrian Interior Ministry said it had formally taken control of the Internal Security Directorate headquarters in the northern city of Kobani. On 2 March, al-Ayesh held talks in al-Hasakah with Abdi, in the presence of Hasakah Governor Issa Ahmed and several military and security officials, to discuss the integration of military and security institutions under the agreement between the Syrian government and the SDF. On 8 March, the Syrian presidential delegation assigned to follow up on the implementation of the agreement with the SDF met with Issa Ahmed to discuss the return of Afrin residents to their towns and homes.

According to the consensus reached between SDF Commander Mazloum Abdi and Syrian presidential envoy Ziad al-Ayesh, the majority of SDF members will be reorganized into three brigades and integrated into the 60th Division, led by Awad al-Jassem. In addition, a military brigade from Kobani will also be incorporated into a division in Aleppo Governorate.

On 10 March, the Syrian government and the SDF carried out a prisoner exchange in Hasakah under the supervision of the Syrian presidential team responsible for implementing the agreement between the two sides. According to the Hasakah Media Directorate on its Telegram channel, 100 detainees were released from Syrian state-run prisons, while another 100 were released from SDF-operated prisons in Hasakah. On the same day, the Syrian Defense Ministry said that Sipan Hamo, commander of the People's Protection Units, had been appointed Deputy Defense Minister for the Eastern Region of Syria.

On 3 August, Issa Ahmed stated that the integration of the DAANES into the Syrian system was 70 percent complete, including "education, health care, agriculture and culture", whereas the "final step”, the complete dissolution of the SDF and DAANES, was not yet possible. However, four SDF brigades had already been integrated into the Syrian Armed Forces. According to Jihan Said Hassam, director of the Qamishli Subdistrict, the dissolution of the SDF was imminent.

In an interview with Rudaw Media Network on 15 August, SDF Commander-in-Chief Mazloum Abdi said he did not want to use the term "dissolution," preferring to describe the process as the SDF’s gradual integration into the Syrian army. He added that some SDF forces had already been integrated, trained, and were operating as part of the army, while more than half of its fighters had yet to be incorporated. He said that integration efforts were continuing and that he expected the SDF’s full integration into the Syrian army to be completed soon.

==== Integration into the Syrian State and dissolution of the Syrian Democratic Forces ====
On 20 August, during the centenary celebrations of the city of Qamishli, SDF Commander-in-Chief Mazloum Abdi declared that the integration of the military, security, and administrative institutions into the Syrian state had been completed and that non-Syrian fighters affiliated with the SDF had withdrawn. However, other media reported that Abdi stopped short of announcing the SDF's dissolution and that issues such as the integration of the Women's Protection Units remained unresolved. On 25 August, Abdi, alongside YPJ commander Newroz Ahmed and co-president of the DAANES Executive Council, Îlham Ehmed, travelled to Damascus for a day of discussions, following which Abdi gave a press conference in which he declared the integration of the SDF into the Syrian state and its formal dissolution.

Numerous SDF units were not included in the deal and sidelined, as the Syrian Army refused to integrate the Women's Protection Units (YPJ) or any pro-SDF Arab units. Syrian Defense Minister Murhaf Abu Qasra claimed that allowing women to serve in the army was "against Islam" despite the anti-discrimination articles of the Constitutional Declaration and the fact that all neighboring Muslim states allowed women in their militaries. The YPJ subsequently held talks with the Syrian Ministry of Interior which demonstrated greater willingness to include armed women in its security forces.

== Civilian impact ==
=== Displacement ===
Per United Nations Department of Political and Peacebuilding Affairs, the government assault on the Kurdish districts of Aleppo "forced tens of thousands from their homes in Aleppo" and into Raqqa, Deir ez-Zor and Al-Hasakeh governorates; according to the SDF, 35,000 Aleppo households were uprooted. The subsequent displacement from Raqqa affected more than 13,000 people by 18 January.

The International Organization for Migration was said to have reported that 5,725 persons had fled the offensive to the Al-Hasakah Governorate by the first ceasefire on 18 January, and that the figure rose to 134,803 by 21 January. The refugees mainly came from Raqqa and Tabqa. The population from the villages surrounding Kobani also took refuge in the city ahead of its siege by the government forces.

The NGO Mezopotamya Göç İzleme ve Araştırma Derneği alleged forced displacement as part of an ethnic cleansing policy by the government, and called for international delegations to monitor the situation in the region.

=== Humanitarian crisis ===
In Raqqa, the offensive damaged critical infrastructure, including disruption to the main water supply. In Deir ez-Zor, it caused public services to be suspended, depriving civilians of education and healthcare. The displaced population was facing harsh winter conditions, with shortages of food, shelter, tents and heating fuel. Hundreds of families unable to leave Tabqa took refuge in public buildings. The SDF side reported difficulties with access to electricity, water, medicines and baby food in Kobani, where the state of siege continued as of 24 January. As of 24 January, four children were reported to have died in Kobani hospitals as a result of extreme cold and malnutrition.

=== Human rights violations and war crimes ===
==== By the Syrian Armed Forces ====
The Permanent Peoples' Tribunal stated the Syrian government had committed war crimes against civilians. The SDF released a video on 19 January that appeared to show four mutilated bodies of its members (two men and two women) with slit throats. According to the SOHR, the Syrian government forces carried out executions of SDF detainees, others suffered verbal abuse such as racist insults and humiliation. Human rights analysts, such as Wilson Center's Nadine Maenza, gathered apparent evidence of summary executions, including beheadings of captured SDF personnel, and abuse of civilians. On 23 January, the SOHR reported the killing of four young SDF captives by government allies in the seized Tabqa, after which the bodies were mutilated and a video sent to a victim's family.

In May 2026, the Rojava Information Center (RIC) published a description of its investigation into human rights allegations based on visual material and interviews with survivors, medical staff, civilian officials and activists, stating that their evidence was available for consultation by journalists and researchers. RIC found 18 cases of the new government's military forces attacking civilians, killing 31 and injuring 40, and attacking civilian infrastructure including homes, vehicles, hospitals, and ambulances. Government-affiliated forces extrajudicially killed 47 people according to RIC. Government-affiliated forces tortured SDF fighters and civilians, and women were physically abused and verbally threatened by the government forces.

According to RIC, as of May 2026, the Syrian Ministry of Defense "ha[d] not addressed the specific issue of the track record of criminality of some of the armed factions incorporated [as of May 2026] inside the [Ministry], and [had] instead chosen to grant commander positions to several leaders of such factions".

==== By the Syrian Democratic Forces ====
The Syrian government claimed execution of prisoners in Tabqa by the withdrawing SDF and called on the international community to join in the condemnation. SANA also reported that SDF snipers have killed and injured several civilians in Raqqa. Charles Lister, the director of Syria Initiative at the Middle East Institute, who had been received by Sharaa in September 2025, alleged that SDF snipers had shot more than 40 civilians dead in Raqqa and that the SDF had killed multiple protesting civilians in Al-Asharah on 18 January, while the Syrian Ministry of Interior stated it was investigating reports of massacres in the Al-Hasakah Governorate. The Syrian Network for Human Rights counted 22 civilian victims of SDF fire during the tribal forces offensive against SDF on 18 January. The DAANES co-chair of foreign relations Îlham Ehmed denounced the reports as fabricated by "sabotaging parties that are not committed to the ceasefire". The SDF acknowledged that one of its fighters was involved in the massacre of 21 people during a failed government forces attack south of Kobani, and said that it referred the perpetrator to a military court. The SDF described the dead as "armed men", while "local activists" claimed that they were civilian detainees recently released by DAANES; Türkiye Today referred to them as detained "soldiers".

==== Other incidents of related violence ====
A participant in the Peoples' Equality and Democracy Party demonstration in Nusaybin in Turkey on 20 January was severely beaten by the Turkish police, extracted from hospital and charged with terrorist propaganda. Late on 22 January, an organised group of men infiltrated a local Kurdish pro-DAANES demonstration in Antwerp, Belgium and wounded six participants with knives; four perpetrators were arrested.

== Analysis ==
According to the Institute for the Study of War, in seeking to exploit the shock of their rapid advance against the SDF, Sharaa's forces prevented an "organised handover of SDF security responsibilities" against ISIS and imperilled the US mission in Syria. The ISW judged that the deployment in the offensive of the Syrian Army's 72nd Division, whose units had participated in Turkish offensives against Kurdish forces during the Syrian civil war (2016–17 Operation Euphrates Shield, 2018 Operation Olive Branch, 2019 Operation Peace Spring), "raised serious concerns about the Syrian government's commitment to preventing further communal violence".

The former US special envoy to the Global Coalition to Counter the Islamic State of Iraq and the Levant James Franklin Jeffrey argued against the criticism that the United States had betrayed the SDF by permitting the offensive. He pointed out that the US had long regarded its alliance with the SDF as "temporary, tactical and transactional" due to a concern about "interfering in Syria's future internal structure or antagonizing Turkey", and that it had only ever "committed to defend the Kurds militarily" from the Islamic State, the Ba'athist regime under Assad, Russia and Iran, not from the transitional government under Sharaa or Turkey.

== Reactions ==
=== Domestic ===
- Syria: President Ahmed al-Sharaa issued a decree enshrining the recognition of Kurdish identity and Nowruz as a national holiday. The Syrian representative to the United Nations Security Council described the offensive as a "limited security operation" provoked by alleged SDF attacks that was expanded on account of SDF's "intransigence" and PKK presence. He asserted there was no discrimination in Syria and criticised the SDF for trying "to exploit the issue of Da'esh detainees".
- Syrian Democratic Forces: Commander-in-chief Mazloum Abdi explained in a televised statement that he accepted to withdraw his forces from the Raqqa and Deir ez-Zor governorates in order to prevent civil war, vowing to protect SDF's gains "to the end". The SDF took the position that the ceasefire agreement was imposed on them by Damascus and regional powers through war and that it deprived them of their rights. They criticised the situation in Syria as lawless.
- Democratic Autonomous Administration of North and East Syria: Foreign relations head Îlham Ehmed criticised the lack of government response to previous integration proposals and the unelected and unaccountable character of Sharaa's power. She described DAANES as a multi-ethnic direct democracy and rejected its identification with "the Kurds" as reductive. She demanded that the affairs of the Middle East be decided through popular participation.
- Democratic Union Party: Party leadership member Fawza al-Yusuf issued a call for a general mobilization of "Kurdistani forces" due to an alleged threat of genocide against the Kurds in Rojava.
- Druze community: Dozens of protesters gathered in Al-Karama Square to demonstrate in support of the SDF and Hikmat al-Hijri.
- Syriac National Council of Syria (SSNC): Council head Bassam Ishak, Syrian Democratic Council representative in Washington, DC, criticised the 16 January decree by President Sharaa on Kurdish rights as a "hasty step" and a "political favor" aimed at "creating a rift between the Kurds and the Syrian Democratic Forces" and improving the international image of the government. He argued that "rights are not consolidated through presidential decrees, especially not during a transitional phase". He later described the ceasefire agreement as a "temporary understanding" and called for "careful monitoring to guarantee a seamless and secure integration process, free from any threat to civilian safety".

=== International ===
==== Sovereign states ====
- China: The Ministry of Foreign Affairs stated that "China hopes Syria could realize peace and stability as early as possible", adding that it hopes "factions in Syria could advance the political reconciliation process through dialogue and negotiation, and find the national reconstruction plan that suits the interests of the Syrian people".
- France: On 18 January, President Emmanuel Macron expressed his concern about the Syrian government offensive against the SDF and his support for Syria's territorial unity. He called for the ceasefire to be made permanent and for integration of the SDF into the Syrian state structures per the March 2025 agreement. On 22 January, responding to street demonstrations by the Kurdish community, the Ministry for Europe and Foreign Affairs described the Kurds in Syria as "brothers-in-arms" and declared that President Macron and Foreign Minister Jean-Noël Barrot were making diplomatic efforts to support "this" inclusive Syria and to "put an end to this violence as much as possible".
- Iraq: On 19 January, the Popular Mobilization Forces' 25th Brigade was sent to the Iraqi-Syrian border in order to prevent a spillover of the conflict and possible infiltration by ISIS elements. In separate phone calls held with al-Sharaa and Abdi on 21 January, Iraqi prime minister Mohammed Shia' al-Sudani stressed the importance of dialogue in maintaining stability.
- Italy: Deputy prime minister and minister of foreign affairs Antonio Tajani, who met with Masoud Barzani in Rome on 21 January, declared his support for the Kurdistan Region of Iraq and for "the Kurdish people in this region", praised Barzani's efforts in Syria that he said promoted Arab–Kurdish coexistence, and expressed Italy's readiness "to do what is necessary to support this dialogue between the different parties".
- Pakistan: Acting permanent representative to the United Nations Usman Jadoon called for adherence to the ceasefire, inclusivity and respect for diversity, and political integration of the SDF.
- Saudi Arabia: Following a call between Syrian president Sharaa and Crown Prince Mohammed bin Salman, the Ministry of Foreign Affairs praised the US efforts behind the 18 January ceasefire agreement, welcomed the integration of the SDF into the Syrian state, and reaffirmed "full support for the efforts of the Syrian government to strengthen social peace and to preserve Syria's sovereignty and territorial unity".
- Switzerland: The Federal Department of Foreign Affairs called for de-escalation, expressing concern about "tensions between different population groups", "worsening humanitarian and security situation" and "reported violations of international law".
- Turkey: On 15 January, foreign minister Hakan Fidan warned after meeting US ambassador to Syria Tom Barrack in Ankara that Syria could make further attacks on Kurdish forces if "dialogue" failed, while the Ministry of National Defence said Syria and Turkey were "one state, one army" for security purposes and vowed to provide support on request to Syria against the SDF, which it labelled a "terrorist organisation". On 18 January, President Recep Tayyip Erdoğan promised Sharaa continued support in pursuing what he described as "the complete elimination of terrorism from Syrian territory", while the Turkish Ministry of Foreign Affairs expressed the hope that the ceasefire agreement would "contribute to the security and peace of ... the entire region, particularly Syria's neighbors". Two days later, Erdoğan warned that the SDF had to disarm and disband, while promising to continue the peace process. Fidan questioned the right of the SDF to represent Syrian Kurds.
- United Kingdom: Permanent representative to the United Nations James Kariuki called for adherence to the ceasefire and an inclusive political transition, stating "deep" concern with the humanitarian situation and the reported escapes of Islamic State members.
- United States: On 18 January, US Special Envoy to Syria Tom Barrack, who helped negotiate the agreement, stated his expectation of "the seamless integration of our historic partner in the fight against ISIS with the Global Coalition's newest member". On 20 January, he issued a statement declaring that the US "had no interest in long-term military presence" and that "the original purpose of the SDF as the primary anti-ISIS force on the ground had largely expired", and urged the SDF to use the renewed offer of "full integration" from Sharaa's government, describing it as "a unique window". President Donald Trump suggested that the SDF had made "tremendous" economic profit from fighting IS and said the US were "trying to protect the Kurds" before underlining his friendship with Turkish president Erdoğan.

==== Intergovernmental organisations ====
- United Nations: Farhan Haq, spokesman for Secretary-General António Guterres, encouraged negotiations and stated that the UN "doesn't want to see any sort of outcome which would allow Da'esh fighters to escape or to reorganize". The UN expressed concern about the humanitarian situation in Kobani.
- European Union: European Commission president Ursula von der Leyen described the "violent escalations" in Aleppo as "worrisome" during her 9 January visit to Damascus, before committing to an aid package of €620 million for the Syrian government over 2026–2027.

==== Political parties and organisations ====
- Peoples' Equality and Democracy Party (Turkey): Tuncer Bakırhan, co-leader of the pro-Kurdish DEM Party, said that the integration agreement was removing any excuses for the Turkish government not to engage in the ongoing PKK–Turkey peace process and warned the government against regarding it as a weakening of the Kurdish forces in Syria. The party organised demonstrations in Nusaybin on the Syrian border.
- Patriotic Union of Kurdistan (Iraq): Leader Bafel Talabani strongly condemned the Syrian government's assault on Rojava as an "act of barbarism against the Kurdish people" and asked the United States to "protect civilians and preserve stability".
- Kurdistan National Congress: The Executive Council gave its "full support" to the DAANES's call for general national mobilisation to defend "the gains of Rojava Kurdistan" from what it described as "jihadist and Islamic State mercenary groups", the Turkish state and its allies. In a subsequent statement, it accused Sharaa's government of pursuing "fragmentation" of Syria through fomenting "Kurdish–Arab hostility" and of acting under the influence of foreign powers, and the Turkish state of sabotaging the PKK–Turkey peace process.
- Swedish Social Democratic Party condemned the offensive, demanded an immediate ceasefire, a return to negotiations and investigation of crimes committed. MP Morgan Johansson noted the links between elements of the new Damascus establishment and radical Islamist groups, and asked that Swedish support for Syria be conditional on the introduction of democracy, human rights and minority protection in the country.
- Socialist Party (India): Foreign Relations Committee issued a statement demanding international protection of the Kurdish people, described as "everyone's favourite enemy", under the Charter of the United Nations, and of Kurdish women in particular from "Julani's crazed soldiers". It called for "peoples of the world", including India, to reject "US imperialism" that "unravelled decades of secular societies in Syria" as "principled global citizens".

==== Kurdish diaspora ====
- In January 2026, thousands of Kurds and their supporters worldwide organized widespread protests to condemn the military offensive launched by the Syrian transitional government against Kurdish-controlled territories in northeastern Syria. Demonstrations were organized by the Kurdish diaspora in Switzerland, Germany, Austria, Canada, Belgium, the Netherlands, Norway, France, the United Kingdom, Greece, Cyprus, Lebanon and Iraq. Similar protests were held in Istanbul. During the 56th World Economic Forum in Davos, hundreds of Kurds staged protests to draw international attention to the military crisis in Syria.

== See also ==
- 2017 Iraqi–Kurdish conflict
- 2024 Syrian opposition offensives
- DAANES–Syria relations
- YPG–FSA relations
