= Hashemiyoun =

Former Iran-backed Shia Syrian tribal militia

- الهاشميون
- Founders: Youssef Al-Hamdan; Musa Al-Mahmoud
- Leaders: Youssef Al-Hamdan (Abu Issa Al-Masshadani); Musa Al-Mahmoud
- Dates active: October 2021–December 2024
- Country: Syria
- Allegiance: Iran; IRGC
- Group: 47th Regiment
- Headquarters: Abu Kamal
- Active regions: Eastern Syria
- Ideology: Shia Islamism; Khomeinism; Anti-Zionism
- Status: Defunct/inactive
- Size: 200
- Part of: Hashemite Tribes Regiment; Axis of Resistance
- Wars: Syrian civil war; Deir ez-Zor campaign; Eastern Syria insurgency; Deir ez-Zor clashes (2023); Northern Syria clashes (2023); Deir ez-Zor offensive (2024) (surrendered)

Hashemiyoun (Arabic: الهاشميون, romanized: Al-Hashimiyoon) was a Shia Syrian tribal militia group. It was founded in early 2021 and was reportedly backed by Iran. It was primarily made up of Shia Muslims from Syria. It operated in Eastern Syria until the collapse of the Assad regime.

== Founding ==
According to reports, the group was founded in 2021 by Shia Syrians in Abu Kamal, Eastern Syria, with backing from Iran. It was primarily made up of Shia Syrians, including tribal fighters who had converted to Shia'ism. It was founded and headquartered in the city of Abu Kamal in Eastern Syria.

== Role in Syria ==
=== Combat support ===
The Hashemiyoun Brigade was formed with Iranian support to primarily combat the influence of the Islamic State and the Syrian Democratic Forces in Eastern Syria, using Shia tribal fighters from the local region. The brigade was also formed to fight alongside other Iran-backed militias (such as Zainabiyoun, Fatemiyoun, Hussainiyoun, Hezbollah) and to alleviate pressure on Shia foreign fighters and Shia militias who were already fighting in Eastern Syria.

=== Trust-building ===
The group was also used as a way for Iran to build trust among the tribal communities of Bedouins in Eastern Syria.

=== Ideology spreading ===
It was alleged that the group was used to convert Syrians to Shia Islam and exploit sectarian division in Syria. It also alleged of spreading the ideology of Iran's Islamic Revolution.

== Organization ==
According to available sources, the group's leader was Youssef Al-Hamdan, also known as Abu Issa Al-Masshadani. Along with Al-Hamdan, Musa Al-Mahmoud, who was appointed by Iran as a dignitary in Abu Kamal, was also a known leader in the group.

The group was estimated to have around 200 fighters.

The group reportedly recruited Shia tribesmen from Bedouin tribes in Eastern Syria, who were a part of the Iranian-affiliated Euphrates Valley Tribes and Clans Council.

== Area ==
The group primarily operated in, and recruited from, Eastern Syria primarily around the Euphrates river. It maintained a presence of fighters in the town of Mayadin in Deir ez-Zor, other parts of the Deir Ez-Zor governorate's countryside, as well as a presence the Raqqa Governorate. The group also maintained offices in the cities of Damascus and Aleppo as well as the countrysides of Damascus Governorate and Aleppo Governorate.
