= 2020–2021 Ayn Issa clashes =

Part of the Syrian Civil War

- Part of Turkish involvement in the Syrian Civil War
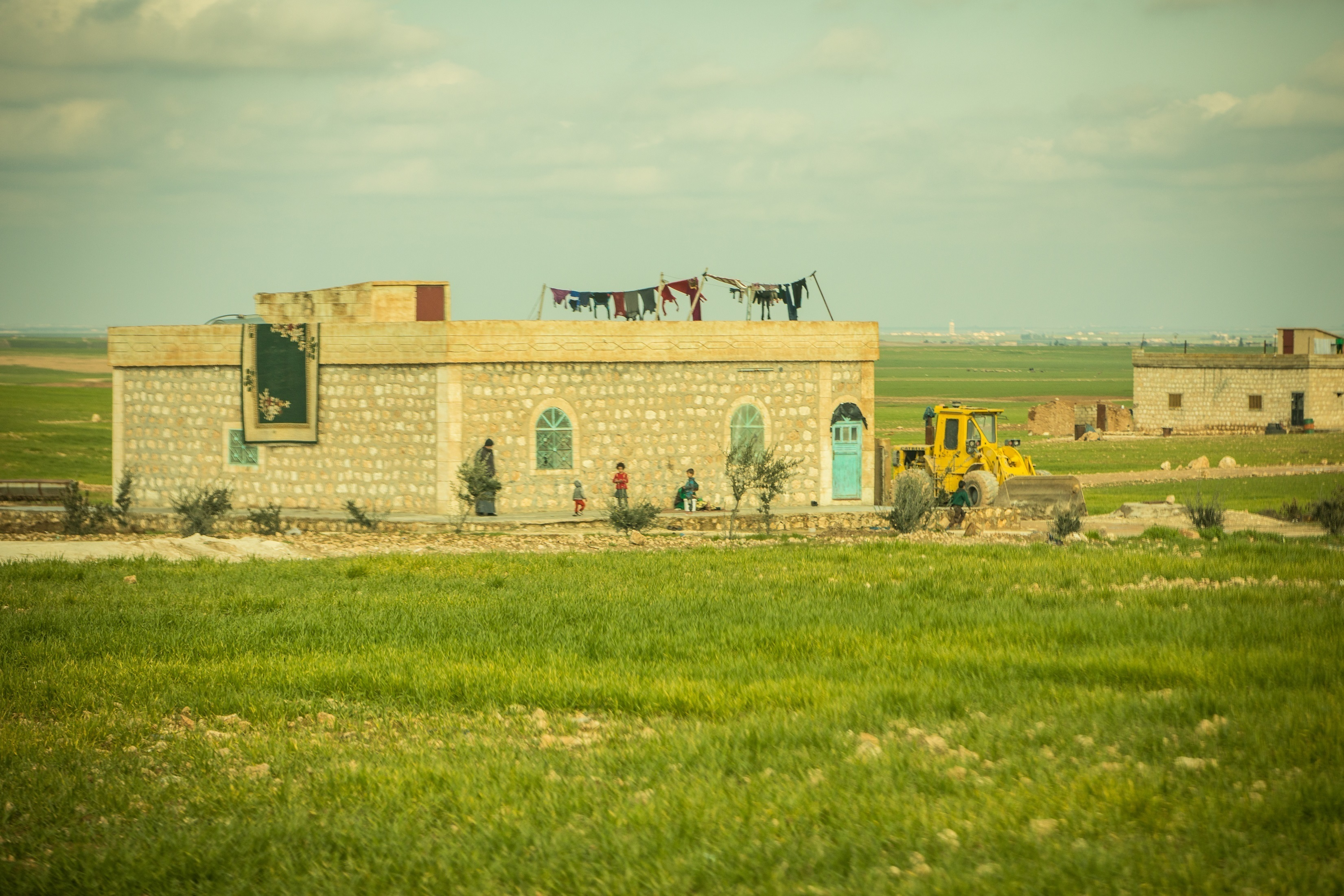
- A house in the Ayn Issa countryside
Date	23 November 2020 – 19 April 2021 (4 months, 3 weeks and 6 days)
Location	Ayn Issa, Raqqa Governorate, Syria
Result	SDF victory
Territorial changes	SNA temporarily controls parts of two villages, but is then repulsed.

Belligerents
Turkey; Syrian National Army (SNA)	Autonomous Administration of North and East Syria

Commanders and leaders
(Turkey) Hulusi Akar	Aziz Xerbisan; Emmar Ekaş; Ziyad Heleb

Units involved
Turkish Armed Forces; Turkish Land Forces; Turkish Air Force; Syrian National Army (SNA); 1st Legion (1st Corps); Ahrar al-Sharqiya	Syrian Democratic Forces; People's Protection Units (YPG); Women's Protection Units (YPJ); Ayn Issa Military Council; Raqqa Military Council; Martyr Ilan Kobanê Brigade; Martyr Adel Manbij Brigade; Northern Democratic Brigade; Jazira Region Young Women's Union volunteers; Euphrates Region Young Women Union volunteers

Strength
Unknown infantry Several tanks, APCs, technicals, artillery	Unknown

Casualties and losses
Per SOHR: 71 killed, 7 wounded, 7 captured 1 tank, 1 bulldozer, 1 military vehicle destroyed	Per SOHR: 25 killed, 3 wounded 1 mechanized digger destroyed Per Turkey: 28 killed or wounded in whole Peace Spring area
- 3 civilians killed, 5 wounded 1 wounded, 1 vehicle burned down

The 2020–2021 Ayn Issa clashes were a series of clashes between the Syrian Democratic Forces (SDF) of the Autonomous Administration of North and East Syria and the Turkish-backed Syrian National Army (SNA) in Ayn Issa during the Syrian civil war.

== Background ==
The line of contact between the Syrian Democratic Forces and Turkish-backed Syrian National Army forces had mainly been focused on Ayn Issa, Raqqa Governorate, with clashes being frequent.

During the 2019 Turkish offensive into north-eastern Syria, clashes occurred between the SNA and SDF on 20 November 2019 around SDF-controlled Ayn Issa, resulting in the death of eight SNA fighters and four SDF fighters. According to the SDF, the SNA attacked positions in Tell Tamer and villages around Ayn Issa with rockets, UAVs and heavy weapons. As a result of fighting in Ayn Issa, guards of the Ayn Issa refugee camp left their posts to fight the SNA, resulting in several IS families housed there to escape the camp. Later in the same day, the SDF launched an offensive to retake Shrekrak village silos from the SNA, shelling SNA positions, with the SNA in turn shelling the surrounding villages controlled by SDF. The SNA advanced towards Ayn Issa, resulting in the death of 13 SNA fighters and six SDF fighters. The SDF managed to regain full control of Ayn Issa and its surroundings after heavy clashes and a counterattack with Russian planes seen flying over Ayn Issa after the failed offensive; by this time, the Kurds and the Syrian government–and therefore Russia–agreed to a joint presence in the region. After the fighting, the SDF further secured villages around Ayn Issa. 21 SNA fighters were killed in the fighting while the SDF's casualties were unknown.

Turkey has always had an interest in the area and has widely regarded the SDF units as having ties to the PKK organization, which it regards as a terrorist group. The Turkish incursion into north-eastern Syria ended short of the M4 highway that spans through most of Syria; cutting the highway would be a major blow to the SDF. In early October 2020, Turkey's president Recep Tayyip Erdogan began threatening to launch another offensive into the area calling it a "terrorist zone." On 19 November 2020, military sources from the SDF confirmed that Turkey had set up a military base in the village of Sayda, north of Ayn Issa.

== Clashes ==
=== Preliminary shelling ===
Tensions increased when Turkish and allied forces intensified shelling on Ayn Issa and its surroundings in the northern Raqqa countryside on 23 November, thus violating the October 2019 agreements. Officials stated that the violations had worsened in the past few days. It was reported that 11 SNA and several SDF fighters died during the skirmishes. The next day, it was reported that over 30 SNA fighters were killed during a failed infiltration attempt in the vicinity of Ayn Issa. A few days later a Turkish rocket attack near the town reportedly injured two children and destroyed some houses. Because of this and several other incidents, civilians began to flee the area. On 1 December, Turkish bombardments renewed in the village of Sayda and the outskirts of Ayn Issa. Local news media reported on 6 December that SNA fighters supported by Turkish elements intensified their attacks on Ayn Issa amid fears of a new Turkish offensive into the region.

On December 10, the Syrian Observatory for Human Rights (SOHR) reported that 7,000 people had fled their homes in Ayn Issa over the past month, fearing a Turkish military campaign. There had been daily shelling concentrated on Ayn Issa and its surroundings and the M4 highway. In response to Russia's lack of a response to the developments, residents of the town held two demonstrations.

=== Attempted SNA advance ===
After a week of relative calm, SNA forces backed by Turkish artillery launched an attack on 18 December on the Jahbal and Mushayrifah villages in the eastern countryside of Ayn Issa. The factions were unable to capture any new positions. Nine SNA fighters and two SDF fighters were killed during the attack. On 19 December, there were again clashes reported on the same frontline without any territorial changes. The following week was characterized by daily shelling and clashes on the villages of Jahbal and Mushayrifah in the northeastern outskirts of Ayn Issa. The clashes included several attempts by the SNA to seize the village of Mushayrifah. This village is seen as a strategic village, as it is located along the M4 international road, which the Turkish backed forces sought to cut off. Meanwhile, an SDF commander criticized Russia's stance in the conflict. In recent talks he accused the Russian counterpart of pressuring the SDF to hand over the lands of Ayn Issa to the Syrian government in exchange for Russian protection against the Turkish attacks.

The fighting shifted towards the northwestern countryside of Ayn Issa in the first week of January 2021. Clashes erupted when the SNA, backed by Turkish artillery, tried to advance on the villages of Khaldiyah and Mu'alaq. The villages witnessed clashes again on January 6, with the SDF managing to destroy a technical belonging to the SNA on the Mu'alaq frontline. Kurdish officials claimed that Turkey is accelerating its efforts to capture more ground in northern Syria during the current presidential transition period in the United States. One official stated that Ankara knew that the upcoming US administration would have a different policy towards the region, and that this was the reason the SDF was being pressured so heavily around Ayn Issa.

=== Subsequent skirmishes ===
After six days of tense calm, clashes renewed on 12 January in the villages of Jahbal and Mushayrifah, following a push by Turkish-backed forces. On 23 January, the SDF reportedly foiled an SNA infiltration attempt on the same front. Three days later, Turkish forces shelled SDF positions on the village of Sayda and the M4 road. While Turkish forces shelled the villages of Khaldiyah, Mu'alaq and Istirahat Saqr in northern Raqqa, the Syrian Armed Forces brought tens of soldiers into the 93rd Brigade south of Ayn Issa.

Tensions between the SDF and the SAA also increased following the Siege of Qamishli and Al-Hasakah. The SDF feared that the Syrian government, together with Russia, would strike a deal with Turkey and withdraw from Ayn Issa in a betrayal. In exchange, Damascus was seeking a plan to expel rebel forces and end the Turkish military presence in the Idlib Governorate. Russia withdrew from Ayn Issa and Al-Hasakah on 21 February seeking to exert pressure on the SDF after it refused to hand over nearby villages and food silos to regime forces. Hours later, Russian forces returned after discontent from the area's residents.

In the next month a Turkish officer, 3 Turkish backed militants, and 2 SDF fighters were killed on March 19 according to SOHR after several clashes and exchanges of artillery fire between the two sides. Turkish shelling on Hadriyat village east of Ayn Issa resulted in the death of one child, four other people were reportedly wounded. On the next day Turkish forces began to use aircraft to target SDF positions around Ayn Issa. The SOHR documented the deaths of 5 SDF fighters that had been killed during Turkish bombardments and further clashes in the town on March 21. Days later, Turkish-backed forces killed 7 additional members of SDF's Raqqa Military Council.

As the spring progressed, the situation calmed down, with the last skirmishes reported on 19 April when Turkish-backed forced shelled positions in Ayn Issa, injuring three people at a petrol station.

== See also ==
- 2018 Syrian-Turkish border clashes
- 2019 Tell Rifaat clashes
- Operation Dawn of Freedom
- Manbij offensive (2024)
- East Aleppo offensive (2024–2025)
