= Northern Democratic Brigade =

Free Syrian Army unit

- لواء الشمال الديمقراطي; Liwa al-Shamal al-Democrati
- Emblem of the Northern Democratic Brigade. The unit also uses the Syrian independence flag.
- Leaders: Absi Taha ("Abu Omar al-Idlibi"); Alexander Khalil; Alexander Alaa
- Dates active: c. 2013 – ?
- Headquarters: Jabal Zawiya (2013–2014); Afrin District (2014–2015); Shahba region (2016–2024)
- Active regions: Northern Syria
- Ideology: Democracy Syrian nationalism; Anti-neo-Ottomanism; Anti-racism; Anti-Islamism; Federalism (Syria); Democratic confederalism
- Size: c. 1200–1300
- Part of: Free Syrian Army: Free Syria Brigade (disputed timeline); Syrian Revolutionaries Front (2013–2014); Syrian Salvation Front (2014); Free Zawiya Brigade (2013–2014); Army of Revolutionaries (2015–2016); Syrian Democratic Forces (2015–2026): Idlib Military Council; Manbij Military Council
- Wars: the Syrian Civil War

The Northern Democratic Brigade (Arabic: لواء الشمال الديمقراطي, romanized: Liwa al-Shamal al-Democrati) is a Free Syrian Army unit that is closely allied to the Syrian Kurdish YPG and YPJ in Afrin Region since 2014. Led by Absi Taha, Alexander Khalil, and Alexander Alaa, it also joined the Syrian Democratic Forces (SDF) in November 2015. The initial members of the group originated from Jabal Zawiya in Idlib, and it has recruited Arabs from Idlib, Aleppo, and other cities in northern Syria since allying with the YPG. Since joining the SDF, the unit has begun to operate across much of northern and eastern Syria, participating in operations against anti-SDF Syrian opposition factions, the Islamic State, the Turkish Armed Forces, and the Syrian National Army. When the SDF was dissolved in 2026, the Northern Democratic Brigade was among the member units which were sidelined and refused integration into the Syrian Army.

== Etymology ==
The unit is generally called "Northern Democratic Brigade", although its Arabic name is more correctly translated as "Brigade of the Democratic North". It is also called "Forces of the Democratic North" (Quwat al-Shamal al-Dimoqrati). It is known as "Northern Democratic Brigade" since 2015. Before this date, the militia was called "al-Qa'qa' Brigade"(Arabic: لواء القعقاع).

== History ==
=== Formation and alliance with the YPG ===
The unit was formed in Idlib Governorate around 2013 and was originally operating as the Free Syrian Army's al-Qa'qa' Brigade, part of the Free Zawiya Brigade based in the Jabal Zawiya region of Idlib. In the course of 2014, it first joined the Free Syria Brigade, and then switched to the Syrian Revolutionaries Front (SRF). When the SRF moved closer to radical Islamist groups, it expelled the al-Qa'qa' Brigade, whereupon the militia became part of the Syrian Salvation Front in May 2014. At the time, the unit repeatedly clashed with jihadist factions in Aleppo and Idlib. When the al-Nusra Front–SRF/Hazzm Movement conflict broke out, the al-Qa'qa' Brigade, then as part of the Syrian Salvation Front's Free Zawiya Union, was pushed out of the region by the al-Nusra Front, Jund al-Aqsa, and Ahrar al-Sham by November 2014, and withdrew north to the YPG-held Afrin Canton. According to the unit's spokesman, the Northern Democratic Brigade was officially organized by Absi Taha ("Abu Omar al-Idlibi") in early 2015. Its initial members were survivors of the Syrian Salvation Front. However, it continued to be called "al-Qa'qa' Brigade" during the following months.

In November 2015, the al-Qa'qa' Brigade was one of several FSA groups from the Idlib and Aleppo Governorates that officially joined the newly founded Syrian Democratic Forces, and also became part of the Army of Revolutionaries. Soon after its accession into the SDF and the Army of Revolutionaries, the al-Nusra Front and Ahrar al-Sham accused the al-Qa'qa' Brigade of apostasy and launched an attack on the SDF in northern Aleppo. Nevertheless, the unit managed to send some of its forces to the Kobanî and Jazira Cantons to fight against Islamic State of Iraq and the Levant (ISIL), for example taking part in the offensive to capture al-Hawl. By January 2016, one of the al-Qa'qa' Brigade's leaders, Abu Omar al-Idlibi, was appointed the military commander of the Army of Revolutionaries. Nevertheless, the brigade eventually left the Army of Revolutionaries in February 2016. By this point, the unit was generally known by its new name "Northern Democratic Brigade", and became an independent group within the SDF.

=== Continued operations against pro-Turkish forces and ISIL ===
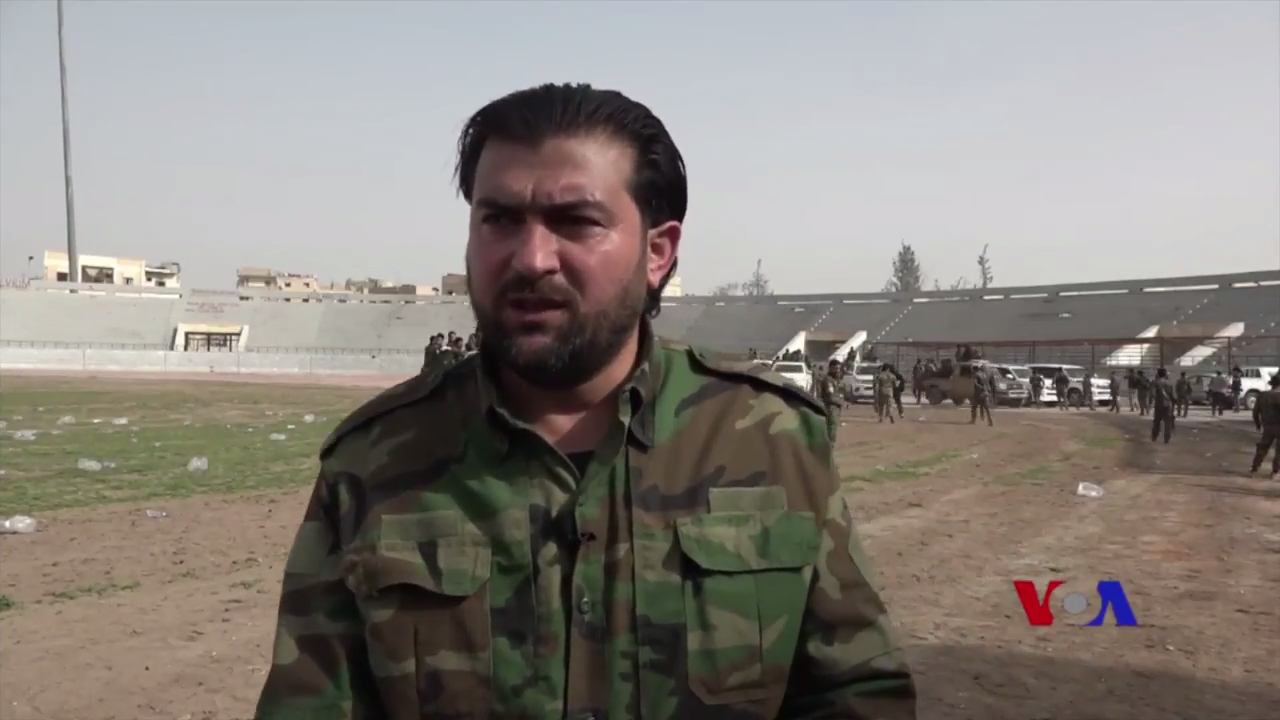
Absi Taha, also known by his nom de guerre Abu Omar al-Idlibi, a commander in the Northern Democratic Brigade, in Raqqa, 6 March 2018. The group at the time redeployed fighters from Raqqa to Afrin.

In August 2016, the Northern Democratic Brigade and other pro-SDF FSA groups condemned the Turkish military intervention in Syria and the international coalition for supporting it, accusing the Turkish-backed forces of committing "massacres" in villages near Jarabulus, and announced their support for the SDF's Jarabulus Military Council. Soon after, the brigade participated in the Western al-Bab offensive against ISIL forces in northern Aleppo, and captured Harbul, Maarat Umm Hawsh, and several other villages in the area. In October 2016, the group participated in the second Western al-Bab offensive, during which it helped to capture the village Tal Malid from the Turkish-backed rebel groups (TFSA). In course of the following Battle of al-Bab, the Northern Democratic Brigade again fought TFSA groups, including at al-Samakia.

In the final phase of the Battle of Aleppo in December 2016, the Northern Democratic Brigade called upon FSA groups encircled in the city to join the SDF, claiming that one local unit, the "Complete Military Battalion" had already joined it. Since June 2017, the Northern Democratic Brigade also sent its fighters to take part in the SDF campaign to capture Raqqa from ISIL. Units from the group were stationed in Tabqa while others participated in the Battle of Raqqa.

On 2 July, the military commander of the unit declared that the Northern Democratic Brigade was ready to help "liberate all Syrian territory from the Turkish occupation" and called on TFSA groups to defect to the SDF. This statement was in response to alleged Turkish plans to invade Afrin Canton and the Shahba region. He repeated this declaration four days later in course of a joint statement by several Arab SDF groups against Turkey. After the Turkish Armed Forces intervened in Idlib Governorate against both Tahrir al-Sham as well as the YPG/YPJ, the Northern Democratic Brigade denounced this move as an attempt of the "Ottoman state" to besiege Aleppo and Afrin. In response, the group announced that it would attempt to form a military council with other FSA remnant factions in order to fight against both the Turkish Army as well as Tahrir al-Sham, affiliated with al-Qaeda, in Idlib. In December 2017, a Northern Democratic Brigade commander also accused Turkey of sending ex-ISIL fighters into Idlib Governorate in order to expand its influence there.

When Turkey began to prepare its military intervention in Afrin, a commander of the Northern Democratic Brigade declared that his men are "ready and are responding to any source of fire"; the militia consequently took part in the fighting against the Turkish-backed forces at the villages of Marnaz, Ain Dukna, Shirwa and Mount Lilon in late January 2018. On 6 March 2018, the Northern Democratic Brigade's contingents in eastern Syria, based in Raqqa and Deir ez-Zor Governorate, announced that they would be transferred to Afrin. After the Turkish-led forces captured Afrin, the Northern Democratic Brigade mostly relocated to Manbij, even joining the Manbij Military Council.

By September 2018, 25 fighters of the militia completed a special forces training at the Zaqour al-Zawiya camp. By early 2019, the Northern Democratic Brigade had rejoined the Deir ez-Zor campaign against ISIL, and was taking part in the Battle of Baghuz Fawqani.

When Turkey launched an invasion of north-eastern Syria, the Northern Democratic Brigade announced that it would fight with the rest of the SDF against the Turkish-led forces. The unit consequently fought at Ras al-Ayn and Tell Abyad. In late 2020, the group was among the forces defending Ayn Issa from the Turkish military and Syrian National Army.

In August–September 2023, the Northern Democratic Brigade supported operations by the SDF to defeat a tribal uprising in the Deir ez-Zor Governorate. At least five members of the militia were killed during the fighting.

In February 2026, the Syrian Interior Ministry opened a settlement center for members affiliated with the Syrian Democratic Forces (SDF) in Idlib, due to the state’s desire to allow for the settlement of the status of members from the province who were fighting with the SDF, within the formations of the Northern Democratic Brigade and the remnants of the Syrian Revolutionaries Front. During the battles that led to the decline of the SDF’s influence, hundreds of Arab fighters announced their defection from it in Raqqa, Deir ez-Zor and the Aleppo countryside, but this did not extend to the fighters from Idlib Governorate, specifically the elements of the Northern Democratic Brigade affiliated with the SDF, led by Absi al-Taha (known as "Abu Omar al-Idlibi"), and Jaysh al-Thuwar leader Abdul Malik Bard (known as "Abu Ali Bard").

When the SDF was dissolved in August 2026, the Northern Democratic Brigade and other Arab-majority units were sidelined and refused integration into the Syrian Army. Abu Omar al-Idlibi argued that "Arabs in the SDF are the biggest losers" in regard of the agreement between the Syrian government and the SDF, assuming that the pro-SDF Arabs were viewed as "traitors" by Ahmed al-Sharaa's government.

== Organization ==
The group's founder is Absi Taha, best known by his nom de guerre "Abu Omar al-Idlibi". As of 2020, Absi Taha acted as the Northern Democratic Brigade commander for the Raqqa area, whereas Alexander Khalil and Alexander Alaa lead the unit's forces stationed in Manbij. Fayyad Abdullah is another commander of the unit, while Khaled Zino serves as spokesperson, and Iyad Khatib is the director of the brigade's political bureau.

Overall the Northern Democratic Brigade consists of 1200 to 1300 fighters. From 2015 to 2020, 46 members of the group have been killed in combat. When the group's founding members retreated from Idlib, they took their families with them; they consequently became refugees living in SDF-held areas. The unit has recruited fighters from Idlib, Aleppo, Damascus, and Latakia.

== Ideology ==
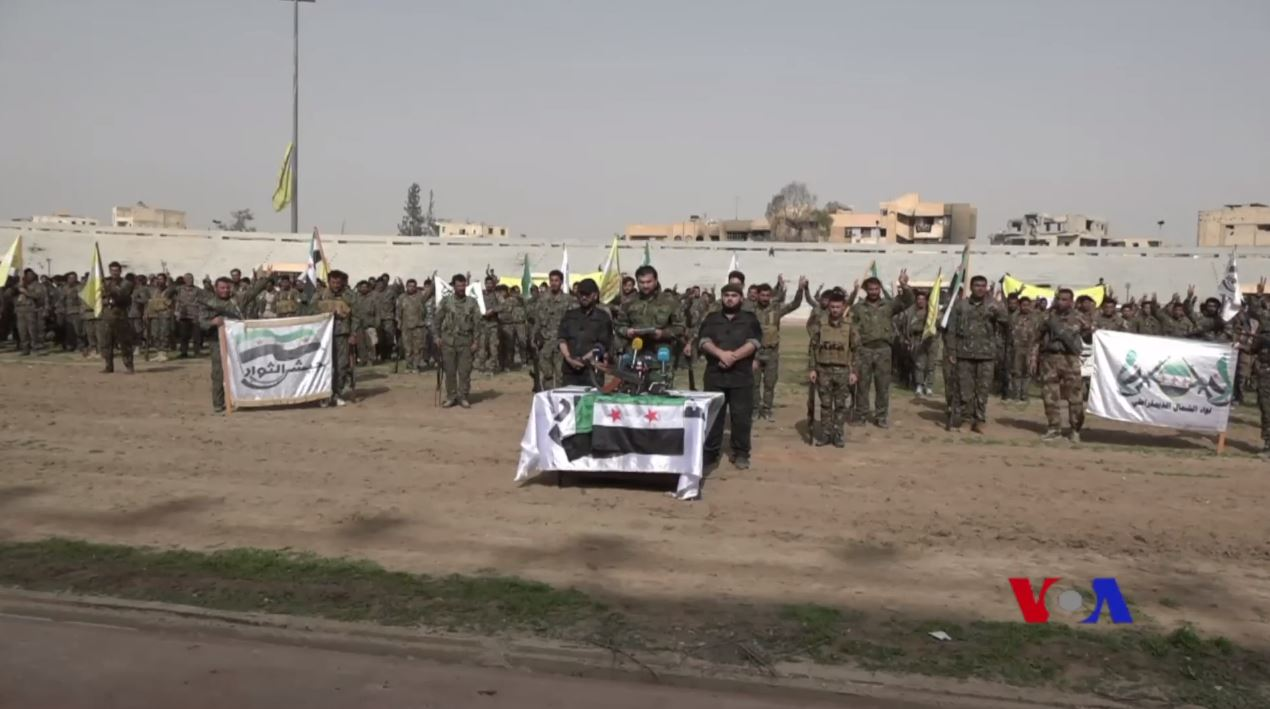
Fighters of the Northern Democratic Brigade and Army of Revolutionaries in Raqqa, March 2018

The Northern Democratic Brigade portrays itself as Syrian nationalist group that wants to ensure a "colorful and democratic Syria on the basis of co-existence and justice" and thus rejects authoritarianism and Islamism. The militia has also voiced support for the federalization of Syria. As result, it is opposed to both the al-Assad family's rule as well as much of the Syrian opposition, believing that the latter has betrayed the Syrian revolution by allying with Islamist forces. The group also rejects the influence of Turkey and the Gulf states on the Syrian rebels, as it considers these states to be primarily motivated by self-interest instead of genuinely supporting the revolution. The Northern Democratic Brigade believes that Turkey's interventions in the Syrian Civil War are motivated by imperialistic ambitions (Neo-Ottomanism) and has accused it of supporting Jihadists, including ex-ISIL forces.

After allying with the YPG, the militia aligned its ideology with that of the YPG, namely the political thought of PKK founder Abdullah Öcalan. Supportive news sites, most notably Point Media, often show Northern Democratic Brigade fighters waving the Syrian independence flag, but also Öcalan and YPG flags. This has "endeared them to many of the Kurds they work with", but also generated much opposition from other Syrian rebel groups. Furthermore, the Northern Democratic Brigade has joined the left-wing, multi-ethnic Syrian National Democratic Alliance, a party that is active in the Democratic Federation of Northern Syria. The militia, along with several other SDF groups in the area, attended the second conference of the Syrian National Democratic Alliance in Afrin in late May 2017. The militia aligned itself with the Syria Future Party sometime after the latter's foundation in March 2018.

Follow-ups conducted by media "Al-Modon" on Abu Omar Al-Idlibi's Facebook account showed the hardening of his position in support of the SDF and his hostility towards the Syrian state, to the point where he considered the entry of the Syrian army into the Sheikh Maqsoud and Ashrafieh neighborhoods of Aleppo as a "victory over the people". The reasons that led the fighters from Idlib to ally with the SDF can be summarized as "hostility" with the Al-Nusra Front previously, during the rounds of fighting between the Front and some military formations that were affiliated with the Free Syrian Army, since 2014 and after.

== Alleged misbehavior ==
According to Syrians for Truth and Justice, the Northern Democratic Brigade confiscated dozens of deserted and unused houses in Raqqa from February 2020. When some owners returned to the city to sell their property or reclaim it, the unit refused to return the houses, citing their previous non-usage and the need to provide a place to live for the brigade's families.

== See also ==
- YPG–FSA relations
