= Diban =

Diban ذِيبَان
- Town
- Location within Syria
- Coordinates: 35°00′56″N 40°30′37″E
- Country: Syria
- Governorate: Deir ez-Zor
- District: Mayadin
- Subdistrict: Diban

Population (2004 census)
  - Total: 9,000
- Time zone: UTC+2 (EET)
  - Summer (DST): UTC+3 (EEST)

Diban (Arabic: ذِيبَان, romanized: Ḏībān, also spelled Thiban or Zeiban) is a town in eastern Syria, administratively part of the Deir ez-Zor Governorate, located along the eastern bank of the Euphrates River, south of Deir ez-Zor, 17 kilometers south of al-Busayrah and 13 kilometers north of Al-Asharah. Nearby localities include Al Mayadin to the north and west, al-Hawayij to the northeast, Mahkan to the south west and al-Tayanah to the southeast. According to the Syria Central Bureau of Statistics, Diban had a population of 9,000 in the 2004 census. It is the administrative seat of a nahiyah ("subdistrict") which consists of ten localities with a total population of 65,079 in 2004.

Diban is the administrative center of Nahiyat Diban of Mayadin District.

Part of Diban is situated on a hill called Tell Diban, which is also an archaeological site. Tell Diban is identified with the ancient Aramean city of Rummunina, a probable derivation of the Aramaic word rumman ("pomegranate"). The area and its surrounding fields served as a pre-war camp for Assyrian king Tukulti-Ninurta II's army during his last military campaign in 885 BCE. The king reported that Rummunina was situated along a canal of the Khabur River, a tributary of the Euphrates. According to Belgian orientalist Edward Lipinsky, Tell Diban was "certainly occupied during the Iron Age."

During the Syrian Revolution, Diban was captured from the Syrian government by the Free Syrian Army but then occupied by ISIL until the Syrian Democratic Forces captured the town on 18 November 2017 with massive support of the US-led coalition.

On 25 September 2023, 18 local gunmen, three SDF members and a civilian were killed in clashes in the town. The same day, tribal fighters seized the town. On 7 August 2024, additional clashes occurred in the settlement between local tribes and the YPG. On 20 January 2025, clashes occurred between local gunmen and SDF members.

== Bibliography ==
- Bryce, Trevor (2009). The Routledge Handbook of The People and Places of Ancient Western Asia: The Near East from the Earky Bronze Age to the fall of the Persians Empire. Routledge. ISBN 978-1134159086.
- Lipiński, Edward (2000). The Aramaeans: Their Ancient History, Culture, Religion. Peeters Publishers. ISBN 9789042908598.
