= Hashemite Tribes Regiment =

Assad Loyalist Armed Group

- فوج العشائر الهاشمية
- Founding leader: Nawaf Ragheb al-Bashir
- Dates active: 11 September 2023-Present
- Split from: Syrian Democratic Forces
- Country: Syria
- Group: Hashemiyoun
- Active regions: Deir ez-Zor
- Ideology: Anti-Kurdish sentiment; Assadism
- Size: ~1,000 members (As of October 2023)

Hashemite Tribes Regiment (Arabic: فوج العشائر الهاشمية, romanized: Fawj al-ʻashāʼir al-Hāshimīyah) is a militant group based in Eastern Syria, more specifically Deir ez-Zor, and participates in the Eastern Syrian insurgency mainly against U.S-backed groups like the Syrian Democratic Forces and Kurdish forces and groups with the goal of establishing reinforced control of Arab tribes against, what it calls, Kurdish influence.

== History ==
The split first started on 30 August 2023, after the Syrian Democratic Forces dismissed the leader of the Deir ez-Zor military council, Ahmad al-Khabil (also known as Abu Khawla), which caused clashes between the Syrian Democratic Forces militants and armed militants associated with Ahmad al-Khabil and Nawaf Ragheb al-Bashir, who is a top Baggara tribal federation leader and known pro-Iranian who has groups active in the western region of the Euphrates river to fight against Syrian forces of Bashar al-Assad and pro-Assad militants and Iranian militants.

Officers of the Islamic Revolutionary Guard Corps on 11 September 2023, held a meeting with Nawaf Ragheb al-Bashir and other various tribal militias in the Deir ez-Zor region which was held in either the town of al-Hatla or Mayadin. The meeting ended with the agreement to establish a new militant organization named the Hashemite Tribes Regiment with the guise of Bashar al-Assad and an Arab tribal character that would operate on the Eastern side of the Euphrates. Others who attended the meeting included the commander of the Eastern region's front of the National Defense Forces, Mohammed al-Raja, an Iraqi national by the name of Abdul-Sahib al-Moussawi, and an Iranian national by the name Hajj Abbas.

During this time, many Iranian officials chose individuals to lead the Hashemite Tribes Regiment including Abdullah al-Shlash, Ghanim al-Suleiman, Ahmad Salama, and Fares al-Khedr. Abdullah al-Shlash leads the group's local reconciliation process between opposition groups and other elements of opposition which include the Assad regime.Ghanim al-Suleiman was a former member of the Islamic State's Tribes Office but now currently works with the Hashemite Tribes Regiment's reconciliation office. Ahmad Salama is the former mayor of the town Shumaytiyah and is considered, locally, as a mediator who helps with cooperation with Iranian backed militias. Fares al-Khedr recruits many youths from the city of Deir ez-Zor to fight for the Hashemite Tribes Regiment and, what he calls, intellectuals to work for the group and Iran. Ultimately, Bashir formed the regiment and now leads it, leveraging his position as the sheikh of Syria's largest tribe.

As of October 2023, the Hashemite Tribes Regiment has around 1,000 militants in the group.

Most of the members of the Hashemite Tribes Regiment is made up of Islamic State defectors to the group from all over Syria including Damascus, with most joining or just attacking Syrian Democratic Forces territory for money and assets.

== See also ==
- Hashemiyoun
