= Abu Omar al-Idlibi =

Syrian military leader

Absi al-Taha
- Arabic: عبسي الطه
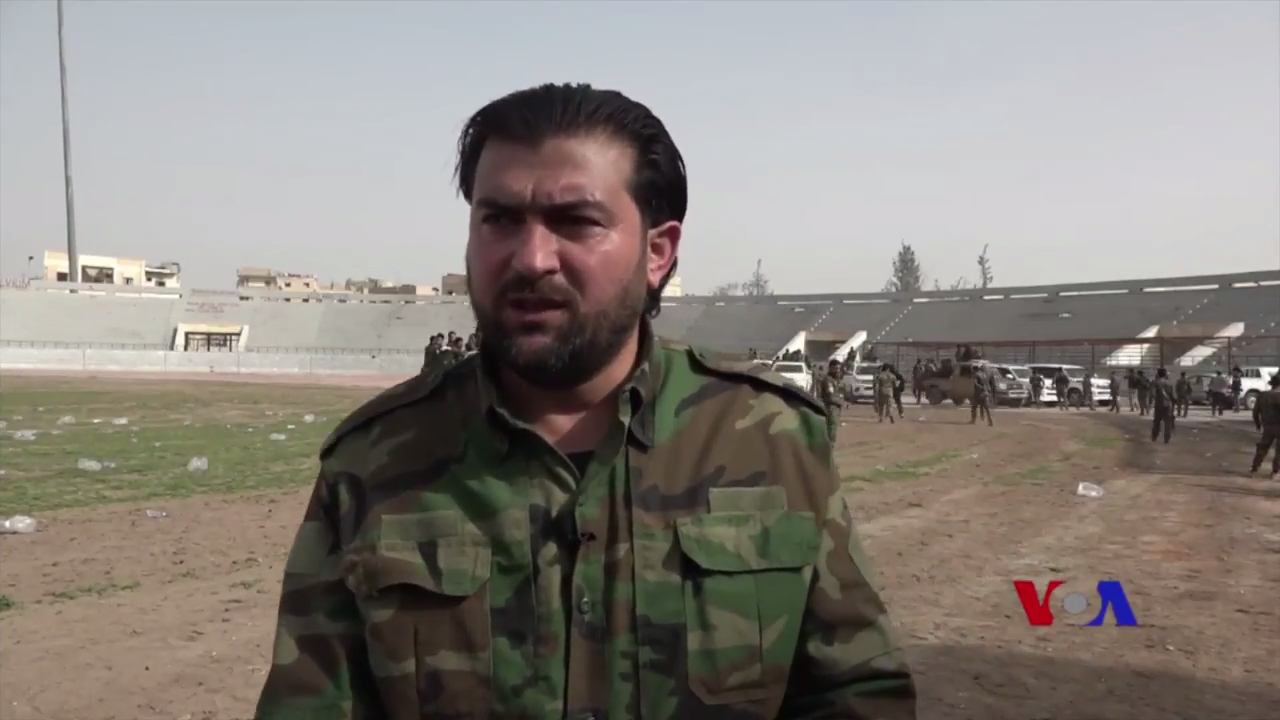
- al-Idlibi in 2018
- Born: Idlib Governorate, Syria
- Other name: Abu Omar al-Idlibi (Arabic: أبو عمر الإدلبي)
- Military career
- Allegiance: Ba'athist Syria (2011); Syrian opposition (2011–2024); Autonomous Administration of North and East Syria (2015–2026)
- Branch: Syrian Arab Army (2011); Free Syrian Army (2011–2024); Syrian Democratic Forces (2015–2026)
- Service years: 2011–present
- Units: Northern Democratic Brigade (2015–present); Army of Revolutionaries (2015–16)
- Commands: Tank platoon commander (2011); Commander of the Northern Democratic Brigade (2013–present); Military commander of the Army of Revolutionaries (2015–16)
- Conflicts: Syrian Civil War

Absi al-Taha (Arabic: عبسي الطه), better known by his nom de guerre Abu Omar al-Idlibi (Arabic: أبو عمر الإدلبي), is a Syrian military officer who served in the Free Syrian Army during the Syrian civil war. As the commander of the Northern Democratic Brigade, al-Idlibi spent most of the war working as part of the Syrian Democratic Forces in Raqqa Governorate.

== Pre-war ==
Prior to the Syrian Civil War, Abu Omar al-Idlibi worked as a construction developer.

== Syrian Civil War ==
With the start of the Syrian Civil War in 2011, al-Idlibi was conscripted into the Syrian Arab Army to lead a tank platoon as a second lieutenant. He and his unit defected to the Free Syrian Army when his village in the Idlib Governorate was attacked.

In July 2014, al-Idlibi accused the al-Nusra Front of committing massacres in the Darkush area of western Idlib, citing the killing and beheading of a FSA fighter by al-Nusra fighters in the village of al-Ghafir.

In August 2017, Hayat Tahrir al-Sham executed Osama al-Khader, commander of the Decisive Storm Brigade of the 21st Combined Forces, on charges including collaboration with al-Idlibi to conduct espionage and sabotage against HTS and other groups in Idlib.

The human rights group Syrians for Truth and Justice reported that the Northern Democratic Brigade confiscated dozens of deserted and unused houses in Raqqa from February 2020. When some owners returned to the city to request the return of their properties to reclaim or sell them, Abu Omar al-Idlibi and the unit refused to return the houses, citing their previous non-usage and the need to provide a place to live for the brigade's families.

== Post-Assad era ==
As the commander of the Northern Democratic Brigade affiliated with the SDF, al-Idlibi stated via his account on X, on 18 February 2025, announced that a meeting held between the SDF, the Syrian Democratic Council (MSD), and the Autonomous Administration of North and East Syria (AANES) resulted in a decision to integrate the security institutions belonging to the SDF and the Autonomous Administration into the structure of the Syrian army led by the new government.

In an interview with Rudaw Media Network in October 2025, he said the US-backed SDF "will become part of the formations of the new Syrian army. They will be integrated as three military formations [units] and several independent brigades, including a brigade for the Women's Protection Units".

In 2026, when the Syrian Democratic Forces joined the Syrian Army, al-Idlibi was sidelined by the government and not offered a position in the army, due to enmity between himself and Syrian President Ahmed al-Sharaa due to conflict between their units during the civil war.
