= Rashid Abu Khawla =

Syrian soldier

- رشيد أبو خولة
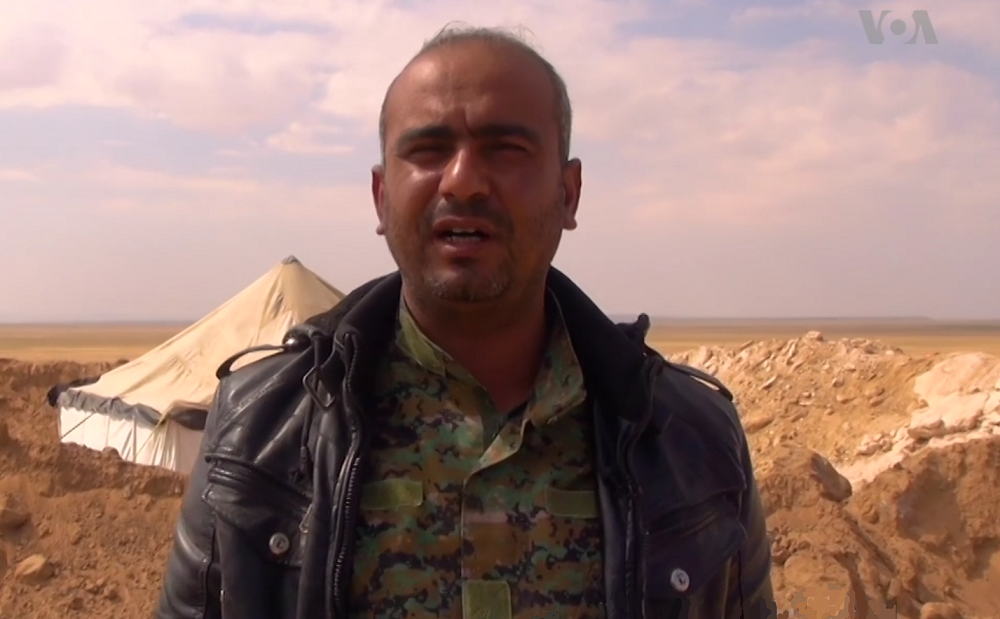
- Abu Khawla in March 2017
- Military career
- Allegiance: Free Syrian Army (2011–2014); Islamic State of Iraq and the Levant (2014); Syrian Democratic Forces (2016–2023)
- Service years: 2011–2023
- Nicknames: Abu Khawla Al-Diri; Ahmed Abu Khawla; Ahmed al-Khubail
- Commands: Deir ez-Zor Military Council
- Conflicts: Syrian Civil War; Deir ez-Zor clashes (2011–14); Raqqa campaign (2016–2017); Deir ez-Zor campaign (2017–2019)

Rashid Abu Khawla (Arabic: رشيد أبو خولة), also known as Ahmed al-Khbeil, is a Syrian rebel leader who is a former commander in the Syrian Democratic Forces and former Syrian Opposition leader based in Deir ez-Zor.

== Background ==
Prior to the Syrian Civil War Khawla was reportedly involved in stealing motorcycles and was imprisoned for it by Syrian state authorities. As the war began he joined the Syrian Opposition in Deir ez-Zor and established his own militia which allegedly took part in running checkpoints that would extort and steal from drivers.

== Biography ==
=== Prior to SDF ===
In 2013 he and his group assisted the Syrian rebels in besieging the 113th Brigade of the Syrian army in Deir ez-Zor.

In 2014 after the rise of the Islamic State of Iraq and the Levant (ISIL) he pledged allegiance to the group. However he later left the group and fled to Turkey after ISIL executed his brother.

=== After joining SDF ===
By February 2016 he had returned to Syria and claimed to have established a new group allied with the Syrian Democratic Forces, opposed to ISIL.

In March 2016, he formally announced that he and his group had joined SDF, and he would later become the spokesman of SDF's Deir ez-Zor Military Council.

On 24 March 2016, he announced that the Deir ez-Zor Military Council had captured several villages from ISIL in northwestern Deir ez-Zor.

In April 2019, activists reported that he became involved with oil smuggling from Deir ez-Zor with an individual known as "Abu Bakr al-Homsi", that reportedly served as a broker on behalf of a company, between the SDF and the Syrian government, and he had also previously organized oil sales on behalf of ISIL.

In July 2019, during an interview Khawla stated that he and his groups cooperated with the governments of Russia and Iraq. However he denied any cooperation with the Syrian government or Iran and criticized efforts by Iran and groups linked to Iran for spreading the Shiite sect in eastern Syria, and referred to them as occupation forces. He also stated that he had recruited several fighters from Turkish-backed groups and tribal militias in Deir ez-Zor, and he referred to areas under the control of Turkey and allied opposition groups as liberated areas. He also said if he were authorized by the coalition to attack Iranian forces and allied Shiite militias in Deir ez-Zor he would, and said regarding Iranian efforts to promote Shiism in Deir ez-Zor, "civilians are being displaced and killed, the names of Sunni mosques are being replaced with Shiite ones and religious centers are being constructed for them".

=== Arrest and dismissal from the SDF ===
On August 27, 2023, Abu Khawla was arrested by the SDF in Al-Hasakah and dismissed from his position as commander of the Deir ez-Zor Military Council. The SDF cited "numerous reports and complaints from the local populace" leading to an arrest warrant being put out by the AANES Public Prosecution office for numerous offences. These included 'communication and coordination with external enemies hostile to the revolution, committing criminal offences and engaging in drug trafficking, mismanaging of the security situation, his negative role in increasing the activities of ISIS cells, and exploiting his position for personal and familial interests, thus violating the internal regulations of the SDF. Abu Khawla was subsequently replaced by his former deputy, Abu Kaith Khisham.

Following Abu Khawla's arrest and dismissal, large-scale clashes broke out between the SDF and Arab tribes supportive of Abu Khawla. In an audio recording released on social media, Ibrahim al-Hafil, leader of the Uqaydat tribe, called upon all Arab tribes in the region to unite against the SDF in response to Abu Khawla's arrest.

== See also ==
- Saddam al-Jamal
- Liwa Owais al-Qorani
- Liwa Thuwar al-Raqqa
