= Gharanij =

Gharanij غَرَانِيج
- Town
- Location in Syria
- Coordinates: 34°47′2″N 40°43′42″E
- Country: Syria
- Governorate: Deir ez-Zor
- District: Abu Kamal
- Subdistrict: Hajin

Population (2004)
  - Total: 23,009
- Time zone: UTC+3 (AST)
- City Qrya Pcode: C5173

Gharanij (Arabic: غَرَانِيج, romanized: Ġarānīj) is a Syrian town located in Abu Kamal District, Deir ez-Zor. According to the Syria Central Bureau of Statistics (CBS), Gharanij had a population of 23,009 in the 2004 census.

On 9 December 2017, Gharanij was captured by Syrian Democratic Forces in their Deir ez-Zor campaign against the Islamic State. On 21 December 2017, the Islamic State recaptured the town but it was once again liberated by the Syrian Democratic Forces in late February. On 18 January 2026, Gharanij was captured by Syrian transitional government forces.
