= Deir ez-Zor Military Council =

Arab-majority militia of the Syrian Democratic Forces

- مجلس دير الزور العسكري
- Leaders: Ayed al-Turki al-Khabil (also known as Abu Ali Fuladh; commander 2023–2026); Rashid Abu Khawla (2016–2023)
- Dates active: 8 December 2016 – 18 January 2026
- Group: Gathering of al-Baggara Youth
- Active regions: Raqqa Governorate; Hasakah Governorate; Deir ez-Zor Governorate
- Size: 1,300+ (self claim, Feb. 2017); 4,000 (self claim, Aug. 2017)
- Part of: Syrian Democratic Forces
- Wars: Syrian civil war: Raqqa campaign (2016–2017); Battle of Raqqa (2017); Deir ez-Zor campaign (2017–2019); Battle of Baghuz Fawqani; Battle of Khasham; Deir ez-Zor Clashes (2023); Deir ez-Zor offensive (2024)

The Deir ez-Zor Military Council was an Arab-majority militia of the Syrian Democratic Forces (SDF), based in Deir ez-Zor Governorate of Syria.

== History ==
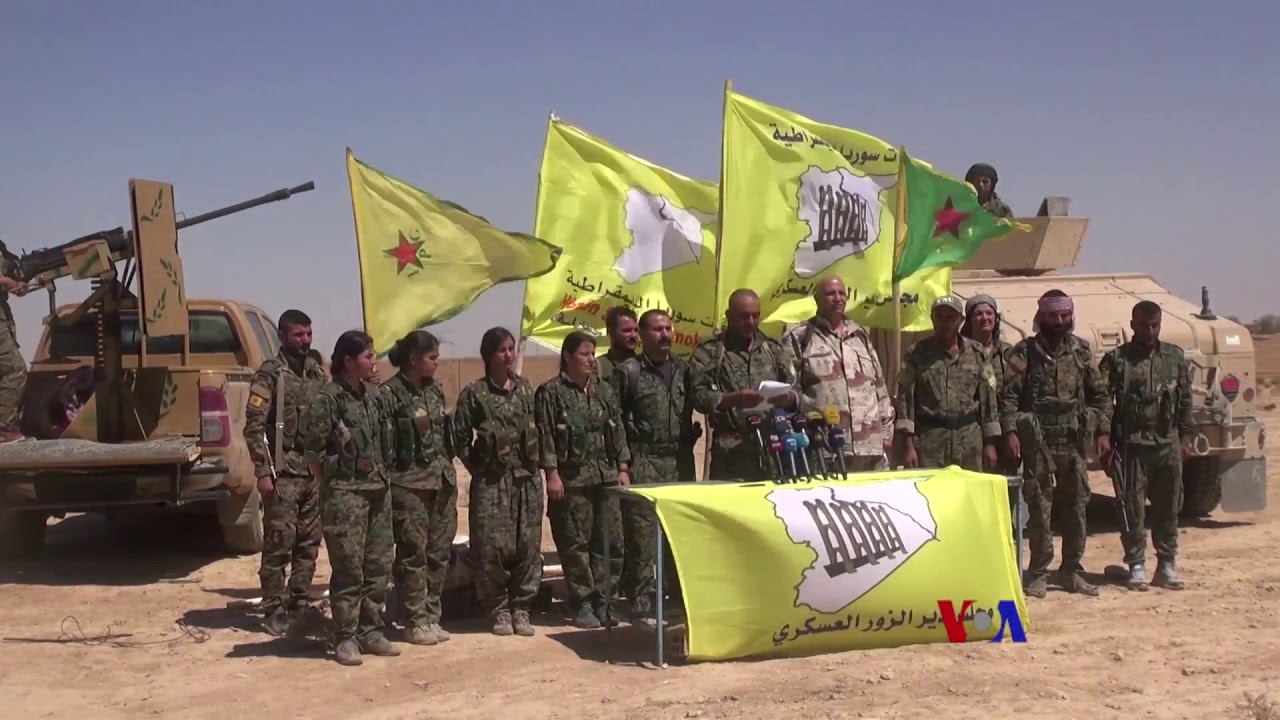
Deir ez-Zor Military Council and allies announce the start of their Deir ez-Zor offensive

On 8 December 2016, the Deir ez-Zor Military Council was created during a Syrian Democratic Forces (SDF) conference in Hasaka. The members consist of remnants of the former armed rebel council of the same name, expelled from the city by the Islamic State (IS) in 2014, having joined the SDF in November 2016. However, the pro-opposition Deir ez-Zor 24 organization denied that the military council's commander, known as Abu Khawla, was a commander in any Free Syrian Army (FSA) group.

The Deir ez-Zor Military Council participated in the Raqqa and Deir ez-Zor campaigns from 2016 to 2019 to expel the IS from those governorates. One of the military council's commanders, Khalid Awad, was killed in battle on 22 February during the Raqqa campaign. In 2018, the Deir ez-Zor Military Council clashed with and defeated pro-Assad Syrian and Russian Wagner Group mercenary forces in the Battle of Khasham during the Deir ez-Zor campaign.

The military council's numbers were boosted by a defection of 800 fighters from the militia group Elite Forces on 25 August 2017, prior to the beginning of the Deir ez-Zor campaign. The fighters, consisting of seven units of tribal fighters from al-Baggara and al-Shaitat stationed in the eastern Raqqa and southern Hasaka countrysides, accused the Elite Forces of corruption. The leader of one of the units that defected from the Elite Forces, Yasser al-Dahla, who led the Gathering of al-Baggara Youth, was arrested by SDF military police and accused of not effectively participating in the SDF's Deir ez-Zor offensive and the "lack of military discipline" on 28 September 2017. The unit denied the charges and accused the military council of preventing fighters who defected from Operation Euphrates Shield to the SDF from joining the Gathering. Dahla reportedly threatened to cease his group's participation in the Deir ez-Zor offensive. He was released some time after, and denied reports that he defected to government forces while acknowledging disputes between him and other SDF commanders.

Week-long protests broke out in areas held by SDF in Deir ez-Zor after threats of attacking SDF held areas in the region were made by pro-government and Iranian-backed forces in Deir ez-Zor such as the Baqir Brigade, calling for the withdrawal of Assad government and Iranian-aligned forces from Khasham. In response to the protests, the council's field commander released a statement on behalf of the Deir ez-Zor Military Council to a tribal gathering, that they would fight pro-government and allied forces if they were to attack. The SDF also denied involvement in organizing the protests, but took no action against them. On 29 October 2019, the CJTF-OIR coalition bombarded Syrian Arab Army (SAA) positions in Deir ez-Zor, reportedly in response to the Syrian military shelling SDF-held areas in Deir ez-Zor, following the coalition's bombings clashes were also reported between the SAA and SDF in the area during which an SAA tank was destroyed.

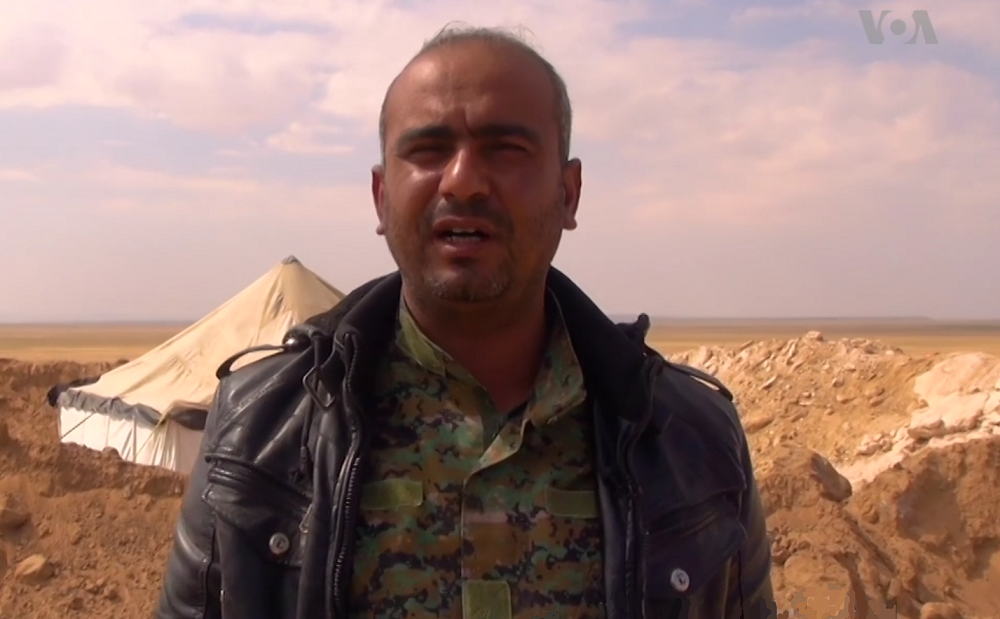
Rashid Abu Khawla, also known as Ahmad Abu Khawla, served as general commander of the Deir ez-Zor Military Council until his arrest by the SDF in 2023

Clashes broke out between the SDF and the Deir ez-Zor Military Council in August 2023, with local tribes within the military council declaring control over six villages along the Euphrates river upon SDF withdrawal on 29 August. The Deir ez-Zor Military Council began clashes with the SDF after the military council's commander, Abu Khawla, was arrested by the SDF who accused him of corruption and unlawful activity, and lasted until September. Abu Khawla was replaced by Turki Al-Dhari, also known as Abu Laith Khasham. The military council's organisation and leadership was restructured in October 2024 and a new commander, Ayed al-Turki al-Khabil, also known as Abu Ali Fuladh, was installed.

During the 2024 Syrian opposition offensives in late November to early December 2024, the Deir ez-Zor Military Council launched its own offensive against the SAA and Iranian militias in an attempt to capture the remaining government-held settlements east of the Euphrates. Following the withdrawal of pro-government forces towards Damascus on 6 December, the SDF extended its control over the city of Deir ez-Zor as well as the city of Abu Kamal and its border crossing with Iraq.

Following the fall of the Assad regime, anti-SDF protests broke out in Deir ez-Zor calling for the Syrian caretaker government to take over the city. The leaders of the Hajin, Al-Kasrah, Al-Busayrah Military Councils and Koniko Brigade, which operate under the Deir ez-Zor Military Council, have since announced their defection to the Syrian transitional government and the Hayat Tahrir al-Sham (HTS) led Military Operations Command. The SDF have since lost control of parts of the city west of the Euphrates to Syrian government forces.

As of 18 January 2026, following the initial ceasefire, the Syrian transitional government through Arab tribal militias, had gained complete control of Deir ez-Zor Governorate. Subsequently, security forces in Deir ez-Zor launches reconciliation procedures for SDF affiliates.
