= Syrian Democratic Forces military councils =

Military councils for local security and defense

Flag of the Syrian Democratic Forces

The Syrian Democratic Forces (SDF) had many military councils for local security and defense, each being accountable to the civil council of the area they operate in.

In 2016, the Syrian Democratic Forces established four military councils (three west of the Euphrates) in order to facilitate and conduct military operations; the Manbij Military Council, the al-Bab Military Council, the Jarabulus Military Council, and the Deir ez-Zor Military Council.

In 2017, the Idlib Military Council was founded in an attempt to gain influence in Idlib Governorate, much of which is controlled by Turkish-backed opposition groups.

In 2019, the SDF started to form new military councils in order to both decentralize the SDF, and to unify the military and security forces in the region. As of June 2019, the military councils formed during this decentralization are the Kobanî Military Council, the Tal Abyad Military Council, the Tabqa Military Council, the al-Hawl Military Council, the Qamishli Military Council, the Raqqa Military Council, the Serê Kaniyê Military Council, the Derik Military Council, the Hasakah Military Council, and the Amuda Military Council.

== Manbij ==
The Manbij Military Council (MMC) is a coalition established by several groups in the SDF, the Northern Sun Battalion and the Seljuk Brigade, on 2 April 2016 at the Tishrin Dam on the Euphrates. The military council aimed to capture the city of Manbij across the river and many of the council members are local fighters from the surrounding areas.

== Al-Bab ==
The Al-Bab Military Council (BMC) is an ethnically mixed force of the Syrian Democratic Forces, consisting of Kurdish, Arab, and Turkmen militias from northern Aleppo Governorate. The BMC currently maintains a presence in several villages west of Manbij, though its stated goal is to capture al-Bab, currently under the Turkish occupation of northern Syria.

== Jarabulus ==
Jarabulus Military Council
- مجلس جرابلس العسكري
- Flag of the Jarablus Military Council
- Leaders: Abdel Sattar al-Jader †; Col. Ali Hijo; Massoud Allo; Muhammad Ahmed; Ahmed al-Jader
- Dates active: August 2016 – August 2026
- Groups: Euphrates Jarabulus Battalions; Free Jarabulus Battalion; Jarabulus Hawks Brigades
- Headquarters: Manbij
- Active regions: Manbij District, Aleppo Governorate
- Part of: Syrian Democratic Forces
- Wars: the Syrian Civil War

The Jarabulus Military Council is an SDF coalition in the Shahba Region formed by local fighters from the city of Jarabulus and the surrounding areas, who had fled from ISIL.

Abdel Sattar al-Jader, the initial leader of the Jarabulus Military Council and the commander of the Euphrates Jarabulus Brigades, was assassinated just prior to the Turkish military intervention in the Syrian Civil War, and the SDF have accused Turkish military intelligence of organizing the assassination.

The Jarabulus Military Council took part in the resistance against the 2019 Turkish offensive into north-eastern Syria, attacking Turkish-backed forces in the northeastern countryside of Aleppo.

== Deir ez-Zor ==
The Deir ez-Zor Military Council is an Arab-majority militia of the Syrian Democratic Forces (SDF), based in the Deir ez-Zor Governorate. It joined the SDF in 2016, having previously been part of the Free Syrian Army.

Smaller military councils in the Deir ez-Zor region include: Al-Kasra Military Council, Al-Suar Military Council, Hajin Military Council, and Al-Busayrah Military Council.

== Idlib ==
Idlib Military Council
- مجلس إدلب العسكري
- Logo of the Idlib Military Council
- Leader: Abu Ammar al-Idlibi
- Dates active: October 21, 2017 – 9 January 2026
- Group: Northern Democratic Brigade
- Headquarters: Idlib, Idlib Governorate
- Active regions: Idlib Governorate
- Part of: Syrian Democratic Forces
- Wars: the Syrian Civil War

The Idlib Military Council was proposed, and partially organized by the SDF in an attempt to gain influence in Idlib Governorate and counter Turkey and the Syrian Army in the region. It was reportedly established in late 2017, with an official formation video filmed in Idlib being released on 21 October 2017 claiming that the council seeks to revive the Syrian revolution and expand it into combating terrorism and foreign occupation. In the video the council also declared its willingness to fight Jabhat al-Nusra and rid Idlib from their presence, the speaker in the video also described the council's opposition to the Syrian government and Bashar al-Assad and their support for the Syrian rebellion, though the council mostly disappeared thereafter. In March 2018, however, the Idlib Military Council and other SDF units condemned the Turkish-led Operation Olive Branch against Afrin Canton and declared to help the YPG in defending the canton.

The council is also openly linked with the Syrian Democratic Forces' component the Northern Democratic Brigade with the group's leader Abu Ammar al-Idlibi stating his group's ambitions to expand operations into the Idlib Governorate and eventually control it and expel Turkish forces as well as rival groups active in the area.

== Military councils formed since 2019 ==
=== Kobanî ===
The Kobanî Military Council (Kurdish: Meclisa Leşkerî Ya Kobanî) was established on 16 June 2019, with Ismat Sheikh Hassan as its commander.

=== Tal Abyad ===
Flag of the Tal Abyad Military Council

The Tal Abyad Military Council (Arabic: مجلس تل أبيض العسكري, Kurdish: Meclisa Leşkerî A Girê Spî) was established on 17 June 2019, with Riyad Khamis al-Khalaf as its leader. As a part of the SDF-US-Turkish buffer zone deal, the Tal Abyad Military Council filled positions left by the YPG in the Tal Abyad area, and has conducted joint patrols with the American military.

=== Tabqa ===
The Tabqa Military Council (Arabic: مجلس الطبقة العسكري) was established on 18 June 2019, with the Council being headed by Mohammed Raouf.

=== Al-Hawl ===
Tha al-Hawl Military Council (Arabic: المجلس العسكري لقطاع الهول, Kurdish: Meclisa Leşkerî Ya Eyaleta Holê) was founded on 19 June 2019.

=== Qamishli ===
The Qamishli Military Council (Kurdish: Meclisa Leşkerî A Qamişlo) was founded on 20 June 2019, with Piling Qamişlo being one of its co-presidents.

=== Raqqa ===
The Raqqa Military Council (Arabic: مجلس الرقة العسكري, Kurdish: Meclisa Leşkerî ya Reqayê) was founded on 21 June 2019, with Farhan al-Askar as its commander. The council's Martyr Ilan Kobanê Brigade fought in the 2020 Ayn Issa clashes.

=== Serê Kaniyê ===
Serê Kaniyê Military Council
- Flag of the Serê Kaniyê Military Council
- Dates active: 27 June 2019-?
- Wars: the Syrian Civil War

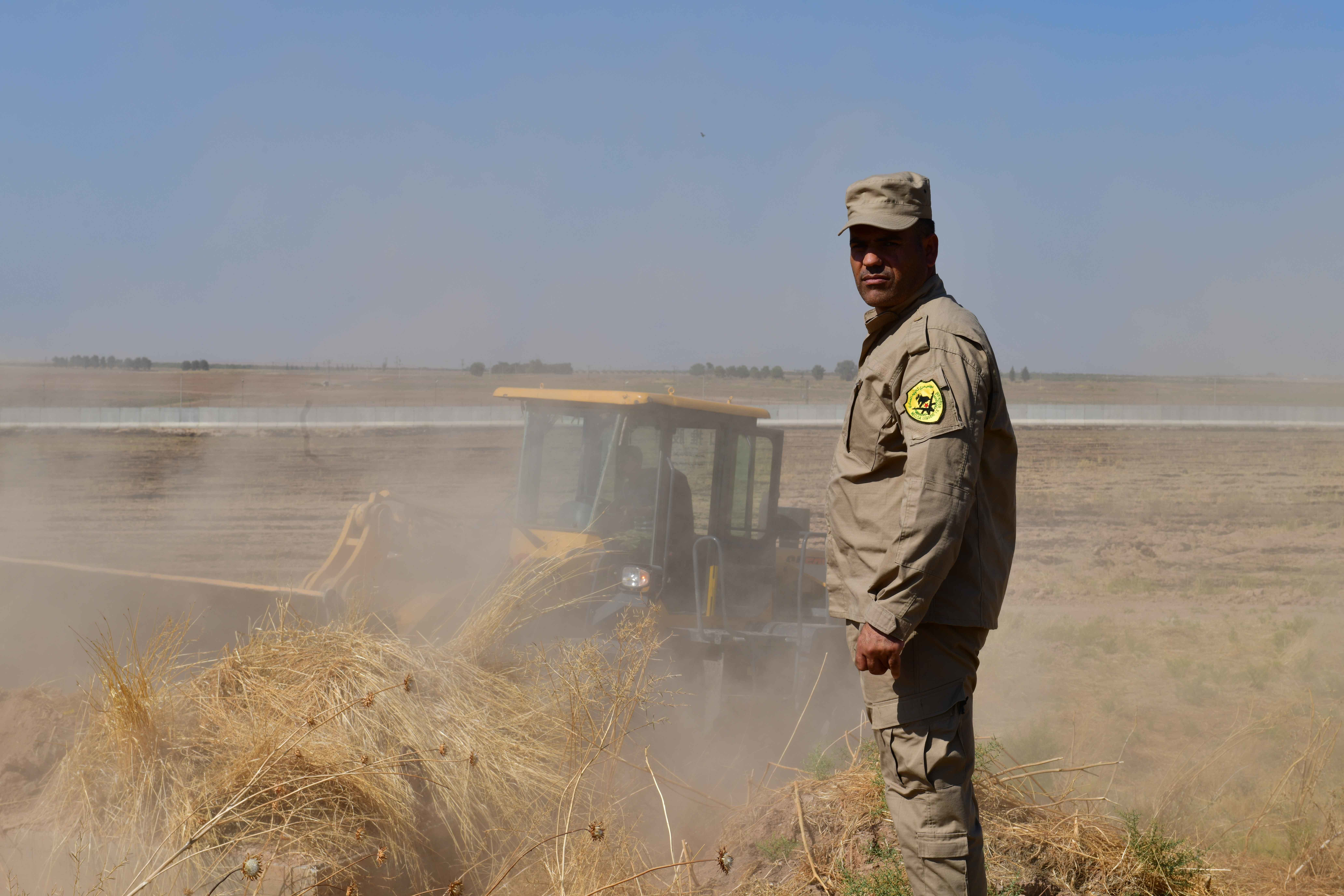
A member of the SDF's Serê Kaniyê military council oversees the destruction of fortifications

The Serê Kaniyê Military Council (Arabic: مجلس سرﻱ كانییه العسكرﻱ, Kurdish: Meclisa Leşgerî Ya Waşûkanî) was founded on 27 June 2019. As a part of the SDF-US-Turkish buffer zone deal, the Serê Kaniyê Military Council filled positions left by the YPG in the Serê Kaniyê area, and has conducted joint patrols with the American military on 4 September and 8 September 2019.

=== Derik ===
The Derik Military Council (Kurdish: Meclisa Leşkerî Ya Dêrikê) was founded on 30 June 2019, with Kurdistan Dêrik as one of its co-presidents.

=== Hasakah ===
The Hasakah Military Council (Kurdish: Meclisa Leşgerî A Hesekê) was formed on 4 July 2019.

=== Amuda ===
The Amuda Military Council (Kurdish: Meclisa Leşgerî A Amûdê, Arabic: مجلس عامودا العسكري) was founded on 4 July 2019, with Amed Amûdê as its commander.

=== Ayn Issa ===
The Ayn Issa Military Council, also known as Girê Spî SDF Military Council, is active since at least late 2020. It took part in the 2020–21 Ayn Issa clashes.
