= Al-Shuhayl =

Al-Shuhayl الشحيل
- Town
- Location in Syria
- Coordinates: 35°5′49″N 40°27′22″E
- Country: Syria
- Governorate: Deir ez-Zor
- District: Deir ez-Zor
- Subdistrict: al-Busayrah Subdistrict

Population (2004)
  - Total: 14,005
- Time zone: UTC+3 (AST)
- City Qrya Pcode: C5119

Al-Shuhayl (Arabic: الشحيل) is a Syrian town located in Deir ez-Zor District, Deir ez-Zor. According to the Syria Central Bureau of Statistics (CBS), Al-Shuhayl had a population of 14,005 in the 2004 census.
