= Deir ez-Zor clashes (2011–2014) =

Conflict during the Syrian Civil War

- Part of the Deir ez-Zor Governorate campaign of the Syrian civil war
- Situation in Deir ez-Zor in March 2014 Syrian Government control Opposition control
Date	26 November 2011 – 10 April 2014 (2 years, 4 months, 2 weeks and 1 day)
Location	Deir ez-Zor Governorate, Syria
Result	Rebel victory: Rebels capture Abu Kamal, Mayadin, al-Busayrah, Hajin, al-Tabni and al-Kubar; Rebels besiege the Deir ez-Zor airport; By May 2013, rebels controlled about half of Deir Ez-Zor city while the Syrian Arab Army controlled the military installations of Deir al-Zor and most of al-Thayem oil field; The Syrian Army launched a counter-attack on the previously lost positions later in 2013; By December 2013, nearly all of the oil fields in the province had fallen under rebel control; On 10 February 2014, ISIS retreated from Deir ez-Zor city, only to launch a large-scale offensive in the province two months later

Belligerents
(Syria) Syrian Arab Republic: Syrian Armed Forces; Liwa Abu al-Fadhal al-Abbas (rebel claim); Supported by: Hezbollah	(Syrian opposition) Free Syrian Army; Islamic Front; Al-Nusra Front; Supported by: al-Okaidat clan (majority)	Islamic State of Iraq and the Levant (Islamic State of Iraq until April 2013); Supported by: al-Bakkir clan al-Okaidat clan (minority)

Commanders and leaders
Issam Zahreddine (Republican Guard Brigade 104 commander); Jameh Jameh † (Head of Deir ez-Zor Military Intelligence); Kifah Moulhem (Battalion commander); Turki Albu Hamad (Militia commander)	Ahmed al-Sharaa (Leader of al-Nusra Front); Abu Maria Al-Qahtani (Sharia leader for al-Nusra Front); Abu Salam Tabsah (al-Nusra Front commander); Mohammad Abboud (SNC commander for eastern Syria) (Syrian opposition) Fares Bayoush (until 2012); Hussein Abu Sultan "Abu Ghanam" † (Lions of Al Jazeera commander); Abu Alaith (Liwa Ahfad Mohammad commander); Mohammad al-Chati "Abu Hamza" † (Leader of Liwa al-Fatihoun min Ard ash-Sham)	(Islamic State) Abu Bakr al-Baghdadi (Caliph of ISIL); Abu Ruqayya al-Ansari (Islamic State) Amer al-Rafdan (ISIL prefect of Deir ez-Zor) (Islamic State) Ali Kmaz † (ISIL field commander)

Units involved
See Units	See Units	Military of ISIL

Strength
9,000 soldiers and policemen, 150+ tanks	17,000 fighters (opposition claim, all withdrawn)	3,000+ fighters

Protests against the Syrian government and violence had been ongoing in the Syrian city of Deir ez-Zor since March 2011, as part of the wider Syrian Civil War, but large-scale clashes started following a military operation in late July 2011 to secure the city of Deir ez-Zor. The rebels took over most of the province by late 2013, leaving only small pockets of government control around the city of Deir ez-Zor.

Since late 2013, ISIS became increasingly involved in the battle, but retreated tactically in February 2014. Still, in April 2014, ISIS launched a massive offensive, taking over all rebel areas. Heavy fighting continued in the city over the following years between government troops and ISIS. By mid-November 2016, it was reported that since the start of the fighting in Deir ez-Zor city five years earlier, around 3,000 anti-government jihadists and 2,500 pro-government fighters had been killed. Government forces were besieged but remained in control of 40 percent of the city and the military airport.

== Units ==
=== Government forces ===
Syrian Armed Forces

- Syrian Army
  - Republican Guard
    - 104 Mechanized Brigade
  - 17th Division
- National Defence Forces (from 2013)
- Syrian Police
- Shabiha (until 2012)
- Military Intelligence Directorate
  - Forces of the Fighters of the Tribes

=== Rebel forces ===
- (Syrian opposition) Free Syrian Army
  - (Syrian opposition) Deir ez-Zor Military Council
    - (Syrian opposition) Ahfad al-Rasul Brigades
      - Allahu Akbar Brigade
    - 3rd Infantry Division
    - 4th Infantry Division
    - 5th Commando Division
    - 7th Division
    - 11th Division
    - Liwa Jund al-Rahman
    - Liwa Chouhada' Deïr ez-Zor
    - Liwa al-Khadra'
    - Liwa al-Abbas
    - Liwa al-Qadisiya
    - Liwa al-Muhajirin ila Allah
  - (Syrian opposition) Farouq Brigades
  - (Syrian opposition) Authenticity and Development Front
  - (Syrian opposition) Saddam Hussein Martyrs Brigade
  - (Syrian opposition) Retribution Army
  - (Syrian opposition) Arab Ahwaz Brigade
  - Lions of Al Jazeera
  - Euphrates Islamic Liberation Front (from February 2014)
    - (Syrian opposition) Ahfad al-Rasul Brigades (Raqqa Branch)
    - (Syrian opposition) Martyr Abu Furat Battalions
    - Jihad in the Path of God Brigade
- Islamic Front
  - Ahrar al-Sham
  - (Syrian opposition) Al-Tawhid Brigade
- Brigade of al-Qaka
- Sons of Islam Movement
- Jaysh Ahl as-Sunna wa-l-Jama’a
- Jabhat al-Jihad wal-Bina' al-Islamiyya
- Al-Nusra Front
  - Liwa al-Fatihoun min Ard ash-Sham

== July 2011 – May 2012 clashes ==
On 31 July 2011, the government sent the Syrian Arab Army into several Syrian cities to control protests on the eve of Ramadan, as part of a nationwide crackdown, nicknamed the "Ramadan Massacre" by opposition activists. One of the cities was Deir ez-Zor.

By 13 August 2011, anti-government activists reported that at least 89 people were killed in the city and its hinterland.

On 17 August, the military ordered a partial retreat of its forces to let a police-guided group of journalist to tour the city. Tanks and armored vehicles moved from the city center to camps on the outskirts.

On 26 November 10 soldiers were killed by defectors in fierce clashes around the city. Several rebel casualties were also reported.

=== During UN-brokered cease-fire ===
On 30 April 2012, rebels attacked an Army base in the city, killing 12 soldiers. Security forces responded with heavy-machine gun and mortar fire, killing at least one civilian and demolishing a school building.

On 19 May 2012, a car bomb exploded in the town, killing nine people. The blast struck a parking lot for a military intelligence complex.

On 22 May, it was reported that two protesters were killed by Syrian police in the presence of U.N observers, who immediately left the area. By this point, it was reported that many towns and villages were under rebel control in the Deir ez-Zor province.

== 2012–2014 battle for control ==
=== June 2012 fighting ===
On 13 June, hundreds of Syrian Army troops, backed by tanks, stormed Deir ez-Zor in response to attacks by the Free Syrian Army in the previous week which destroyed several tanks and APCs and killed dozens of soldiers. Large swaths of the province fell into rebel hands after the alliance between the ruling Alawite elite and Sunni tribes collapsed, leaving government troops with stretched supply lines.

On 20 June, the Syrian Army heavily shelled positions held by the Free Syrian Army in the city of Abu Kamal, on the Iraqi border. At that time, residents of the Iraqi border town of Al-Qaim and activists inside Abu Kamal reported the intense shelling by the army had lasted 24 hours, but that the Free Syrian Army still held the city and the important border crossing.

On 23 June, fighting erupted at Deir ez-Zor airport after the FSA made an attempt to capture it. According to the rebels, 40 military officers, including a first-Lieutenant, defected together with their weapons. The result of the fighting remained unclear.

On 24 June, government forces shelled residential areas of the city for the second day, killing at least 20 people, following which the military withdrew to the outskirts.

On 27 June 10 soldiers were killed while 15 others defected in Deir ez-Zor.

On 28 June, it was reported that the opposition almost entirely controlled the city of Deir ez-Zor, while the military continued its intense shelling, trying to take it back. Human rights activist groups stated that this assault with tanks and artillery had killed over 100 residents. The government also reportedly told doctors not to treat people at local hospitals and targeted with mortar fire hospitals that refused the command. Humanitarian aid workers from the Syrian Arab Red Crescent were targeted by the Army, killing one worker.

On 29 June, according to the state news agency SANA, the Army destroyed a rebel pick-up armed with a machine gun, killing all the rebels inside.

On 1 July, five rebels were killed planting an IED near the city.

On 4 July, four soldiers were killed by rebels in Deir ez-Zor. The same day, SANA reported that many rebels had been killed when the Army destroyed six of their cars.

On 7 July, state-controlled news agency SANA reported that regime forces clashed with a rebel group in the al-Sheik Yassin neighborhood, inflicting heavy losses on the rebels. Among the killed were Omar al-To'ma and Qusai Abdul-Majd al-Ani. Four armed pick-up trucks belonging to the rebels were also destroyed during the clash.

=== July–August 2012 FSA offensive ===
By 19 July, FSA had seized control of all Syrian-Iraqi border crossings. The rebels executed 22 Syrian soldiers under the eyes of Iraqi soldiers and even cut the arms and the legs of one colonel, according to the vice minister of Iraq.

Despite a statement by the Iraqi deputy PM asserting that FSA controlled all four border crossings, though it had been confirmed that only three of them were still active because the Iraqi government had already closed one of them, a Reuters journalist on the Rabia border crossing confirmed the presence there of regular Syrian army, with Iraqi soldiers reporting no activity of Free Syrian Army in the vicinity of the crossing. Three other border crossings with Iraq and Turkey were, however, in rebel hands.

On 21 July, the rebels controlled only the Abu Kamal border crossing with Iraq, adjacent to the city of Abu Kamal, after the arrival of Syrian Army reinforcements to the other two border crossings with the country.

The Guardian covered the fighting in Deir ez-Zor, reporting on twenty rebels groups confronting the Syrian Army in a deadly and prolonged stalemate, with rebels claiming to control 90% of the Deir ez-Zor Governorate.

The al-Nusra Front, the Syrian branch of Al-Qaida, was also increasingly conspicuous in fighting the Syrian government in the Deir ez-Zor governorate, at times working directly with the Free Syrian Army, although relations between the groups may have been contentious.

On 1 August, the FSA released a video which suggested they had captured the military headquarters in the town of Mayadin. On 3 August, Reuters reported that the FSA had seized a complex for political security and other buildings near Mayadin and also killed thirteen security personnel and captured three intelligence officers during the battle. A rebel commander in the area also told Reuters that only one army outpost and an artillery position still remained under the control of the Syrian government near Mayadin.

On 7 August, rebels attacked an oil field in the area which resulted in fierce clashes that left four rebels and six to nine soldiers dead. The attack was repelled. On 9 August, the FSA released another video purportedly showing them occupying a military security complex in Mayadin on 7 August. On 9 August, it was also claimed by British humanitarian Peter Clifford that the Syrian Armed Forces only had three army outposts remaining in the province's countryside and that they were being attacked.

On 13 August, FSA claimed to have shot down a Syrian Air Force MiG-23 over Deir ez-Zor. Shortly afterwards video of its downing was released on YouTube and Syrian opposition and Israel Radio sources the pilot was captured by the rebels. It was the first loss of a government fighter-bomber aircraft. SANA later confirmed its lost warplane, insisting the plane was not shot down, but rather alleging technical problems which forced it to crash-land and the pilot to eject. Later, the rebels published another video showing a captured pilot named Colonel Fareer Mohammad Suleiman in their captivity.

On 14 August, a rebel fighter stationed in the area told PBS Newshour that "all the rural areas are under our control and the cities of Deir ez-Zor, Mayadin and Abu Kamal are a battlefield between us and the Assad army." Again that day, Reuters reported the rebels controlled at least 50% of the city of Deir ez-Zor and that those remaining regime troops were inexperienced and trapped inside security compounds in the city center and on the northern outskirts. A Western diplomat monitoring the Syrian military said that rebel forces in Deir ez-Zor were fragmented but that Syrian Army forces lacked the numbers and supply lines to defeat them. Most government departments have shut and public workers are unpaid in what activists call collective punishment of a tightly knit population siding increasingly with rebels after alliances between the Damascus elite and tribal chiefs unraveled. An estimated one-third of Deir ez-Zor city's inhabitants have fled to the bordering governorates of Al-Hasakah and Raqqa.

=== August 2012 – May 2013 continued fighting ===
On 22 August, the AFP reported that the FSA seized parts of the city of Abu Kamal, including an intelligence office and military checkpoints. Later that day, Al Jazeera reported from the Iraqi border town of Qaim that Free Syrian Army fighters had launched an attack on the only military base near Abu Kamal still in the hands of the regular army. The army had used this base to shell Abu Kamal. Heavy fighting was ongoing. Also, in the city of Deir ez-Zor, the army only held three bases on the outskirts of the city.

On 1 September, the FSA captured an air defense facility in Abu Kamal. Three days later, the FSA took control of the head security compound in Deir ez-Zor city, driving loyalist forces out of one of their three remaining bases on the outskirts of the city.

On 5 September, Hamdan military airport near Abu Kamal was captured by the rebels, after a three-day siege and an internal defection. However, the capture was only temporary, as Syrian troops just outside the base were able to force them to retreat. Still, the rebels acknowledged that only dozens of Syrian troops in the area were able to survive the onslaught. The Hamdan airport was the last remaining place in the vicinity of Abu Kamal where pro-Assad forces kept their stations.

On 28 September, a rebel brigade commander said that after the rebels pulled back from al-Qusour and al-Joura neighborhoods, these locations were then stormed by units of the Syrian army which carried out summary executions. He also said that 80 percent of the city was in hands of FSA, with only a military airport and part of Mayadin District remaining in government hands. The Syrian Army also launched an operation to recapture the Rashidiya neighbourhood.

On 4 November, rebels captured the Al Ward oil field after three days of heavy fighting.

On 15 November, rebels took control of the military headquarters in Abu Kamal, after fierce clashes with government forces.

On 16 November, rebels seized the military airport of Hamdan, the final place that the government controlled in Abu Kamal. The airport was in fact a base used to transport farm products that was turned into a helicopter base. With the fall of Abu Kamal, the main military airport of Deir ez-Zor was the only regime military airbase in the region, thus creating the largest rebel controlled area in the country.

However, after the fall of Hamdan, 12 rebels were killed in the shelling on the outskirts of the city by the army.

By 21 November, rebels controlled two of three major oilfields in the province and were using them to supply themselves with oil. They were preparing for the capture of the remaining one, but needed engineers to operate it. Plans to advance north into Kurdish-dominated Hasakah Province were reportedly also being made. On 30 November, SOHR reported that government troops abandoned the Omar oilfield east of Deir ez-Zor, which was soon occupied by opposition forces. Only five minor fields west of the city still remained under government control.

On 22 November, after 20 days of siege rebels also captured the Mayadin military base from which soldiers evacuated to Deir ez-Zor airbase, thus forcing out any government elements from area spanning from Iraqi city to capitol of the province. Two days later, the rebels surrounded the airport.

On 3 December, fierce combat broke out in the Mouzafin and Joubaila districts of Deir ez-Zor, while rebels reportedly shelled the nearby military airbase. On 12 December, the French Aid agency, Médecins Sans Frontières called for sick and wounded people to be evacuated from the besieged city.

On 11 January 2013, it was reported that the government controlled the neighborhoods of Al Qussour and Joura (north west) and was shelling the neighborhoods of Alwrdi, Al-Jabaile, and Ar Rushdia (south east).

Situation in Deir-ez-Zor, mid-March 2013

On 29 January 2013, rebels captured the important Siyasiyeh bridge (and another smaller bridge) on the Euphrates river in Deir ez-Zor which connects Deir ez-Zor to Hasakah, after clashes with the Syrian Army. SOHR director, Rami Abdel Rahman claimed that "Siyasiyeh bridge is the most important in the area as it connects Deir ez-Zor to Hasakah. Its capture means that army supplies to Hasakah will be nearly completely severed." and that also "These gains in Deir ez-Zor are very important because this strategic city is the gateway to a region rich in oil and gas resources. If the rebels continue to progress and gain control of what is left of military-held posts, the Pioneers camp and Deir ez-Zor military airport, it will be the first major city to fall into the hands of the rebels." Elsewhere in Deir ez-Zor, activists claimed that rebels had also taken control of a government intelligence complex after five days of heavy fighting, with assistance from Islamist fighters. SOHR claimed that the rebels had taken control of the government complex, including the prison, from which they have freed at least eleven opposition figures. LCC also reported that the rebels captured a tank and three armored personnel carriers.

From January to April 2013, there were clashes between the FSA and Syrian Army forces around the political police building in Hawiqa neighborhood.

On 22 February, Free Syrian Army fighters captured a nuclear research facility in Al Kibar from the Syrian Army. The nuclear research facility was the same one which was attacked by an Israeli airstrike back in 2007.

On 2 May 2013 the Deir ez-Zor suspension bridge, built during the Mandate for Syria and the Lebanon period (1920−1941), was destroyed by shelling from the Free Syrian Army. That left the Siyasiyeh Bridge as the only connection across the Euphrates to the western section of Deir ez-Zor and the province of Hasakah, until its destruction in 2014.

On 6 May, the Free Syrian Army shot down a SAA helicopter and killed eight government soldiers near Deir ez-Zor military airport.

=== June 2013 Hatla massacre ===
On 10 June, Shia pro-government fighters from the village of Hatla, east of Deir ez-Zor, attacked a nearby rebel position, killing four rebels. The next day, in retaliation for the attack, thousands of rebels attacked and captured the village, killing sixty residents, fighters and civilians, according to SOHR. Rebels also burned civilian houses during the takeover. Ten rebel fighters were killed during the attack. One-hundred and fifty Shia residents fled to the nearby government-held village of Jafra.

On 14 June, the al-Sina'a neighborhood was bombarded by regular forces at the time when inhabitants of the neighborhood were protesting; no casualties were ascertained. Clashes were fierce between rebel and regular forces in the al-Jbeila and al-Rashdiya neighborhoods after military reinforcements came into al-Jbeila.

On 22 June, violence reignited between rebel and regular forces at the Mashfa al-Qalb (heart hospital) checkpoint of Deir ez-Zor city. One rebel fighter was shot by regular forces at the al-Mawt crossing.

=== August 2013 rebel offensive ===
On 11 August, rebels launched fresh offensive to capture the whole city.

On 13 August, clashes took place in Deir Ezzour city in the Rashdin suburb, as government forces attempt to storm it. Rebels earlier attacked the cardiac hospital in the city, no reports of losses. 4 rebels killed by clashes in al-Jbeila, Hawiqa and Sina'a neighbourhoods.

As of 20 August, the western Hawiqa neighborhood, including the local Baath Party headquarters, had fallen to the rebels. The opposition claimed that 160 government soldiers and dozens of rebels had died in the fight for Hawiqa. Government forces retaliated by bombarding the rebels from their positions in the Joura and Ghazi Ayyash districts. The FSA-affiliated Ahfad al-Rasul Brigade, recently supplied by Qatar with anti-aircraft missiles, played an important role in taking Hawiqa. On the same day, the Army hit rebel forces in Hawiqa district with tanks and multiple rocket launchers, and also battled them in territory separating Hawiqa from the district of Joura, opposition sources in the city said. The government was trying to regain Hawiqa because it could not afford the rebels to be so close to its most important stronghold of Joura and the Army camp there. Air force intelligence and military intelligence, two important security compounds in the city, were also located in the nearby Ghazi Ayyash district, and came within the range of rebel rocket-propelled grenades.

=== Further rebel progress ===
On 14 October, SOHR reported that rebels captured the Resefa and Sinaa districts of Deir ez-Zor city, as well as Deir ez-Zor's military hospital. Three days later, the chief of Syrian Military Intelligence in Deir Ez-Zor province, Major General Jameh Jameh, was assassinated in Deir ez-Zor. SOHR reported that he had been shot by a rebel sniper in the Rashdiya district of the city during a battle with rebel brigades.

On 23 November, rebel fighters seized control of Al-Omar oilfield, the largest oilfield in Syria. Consequently, the Syrian government became almost entirely reliant on imported oil.

On 27 December, rebel fighters seized control over the majority of the town of Al-Jafra, strategically adjacent to the Deir ez-Zor Military Airbase. However, three days later, Syrian troops, backed by units of the National Defense Force, recaptured Jafra.

On 3 February, the rebels were pushing into the city area, capturing Hamidiyah, Hawiqa, and most of Al-Rashdiya. One week later, the rebels took over all ISIS territory in Deir ez-Zor after all ISIS fighters retreated from the city. Within a day, more than thirty FSA battalions and brigades in Deir ez-Zor united under a new coalition called "Mujahidi Deir Al-Zor Assembly".

On 27 March, the rebels blew up a building in the al-Rasafa neighborhood of Deir ez-Zor city with confirmed casualties in the ranks of the Syrian Army.

== Aftermath ==
=== April offensive ===
On 10 April, ISIS launched a three-pronged assault on rebel positions in and near the border town of Abu Kamal and reportedly took control of parts of the town. This marked the beginning of a two-month offensive that ended when, on 14 July, ISIS held all rebel-controlled neighborhoods in the provincial capital after expelling Nusra and other rebel groups. One day later, ISIS executed the rebel commander of al-Nusra in Deir ez-Zor. ISIS also wrested away all rebel-held towns and villages across the province, assuming control of between 95% and 98% of Deir Ez-Zor province.

On 17 August, SOHR said that in the two previous weeks Islamic State (IS) jihadists killed over 700 tribal members in eastern Syria in the oil-rich Deir ez-Zor Governorate.

=== September–November 2014 Army offensive ===
On 3 September, ISIS launched an attempt to capture the Deir-ez-Zor military airport, but the attempt was repelled and ISIS forces were forced to retreat 3 km from the base while the Army launched airstrikes on ISIS positions. According to the Army, ISIS lost at least 47 fighters.

Two days later, General Issam Zahreddine returned to Deir Ezzor with a convoy of 600 Republican Guard soldiers and 90 armed vehicles to reinforce the military airport defense. On 14 September, SAA reportedly destroyed a fortified base belonging to ISIS, killing 14 militants in the process. The next day, Special forces and Syrian Army engineers blew up the Siyasiyeh Bridge (Political Bridge), reportedly killing all the militants who were on it. ISIS thus lost the only available land route to move into parts of the city it controls. The offensive intensified on 11 October, when the Army stormed the Al-Ba’ajeen School in the Jubeileh district of the city. The school was used by ISIS as a headquarters.

On the night of 14–15 October, the Republican Guard 104th Brigade reportedly captured the village of Haweeja Saqr near Deir ez-Zor, killing 33 ISIS militants, including four field commanders, and capturing another 15. Nine Republican Guard troops, including two officers, died in the fighting. On 21 October, ISIS attacked the al-Sina'a industrial quarter of the city. Opposition sources claimed it managed to break through Army defences, but a military source stated that the attack was repulsed and resulted in the death of 23 militants, including Zakaria al-Aboush, a former Free Syrian Army commander of the Ansar al-Islam. Government troops also continued their offensive against Sakr Island in an attempt to create a buffer zone between ISIS-held areas and the old military airport.

On 24 October, ISIS again failed to storm the al-Sina'a industrial zone, suffering about 50 casualties and dozens of wounded according to the Army. By that point, the 104th was clashing with militants in the north of the island and was controlling most of it according to the Army. The Army claimed that the 104th reached the Al Anafat bridge between Saqr island and the city while remnants of ISIS in the north-eastern part of the island still clashed with government forces on 26 October. Two days later, ISIS detonated a car bomb in a residential area on Sakr island, killing 3 civilians and wounding 11 others. The bombing was followed by intense clashes which reportedly left 44 jihadists dead while another 22 were captured. An ISIS drone was downed over the cemetery on the next day. According to the Army, government troops killed another 120 insurgents from 29 to 31 October, and managed to assert control over 90% of Sakr Island.

On 12 November, government troops reportedly captured the western bank fisheries on Sakr Island, which were used by ISIS to travel back and forth from the island to the mainland. A small network of tunnels was also discovered. ISIS suffered more casualties on 20 November after the 104th Brigade attacked their supply bases, sniper hideouts and repelled infiltration attempts. At least 33 militants were killed and 15 captured. ISIS positions in the Central Park on Sakr Island were further weakened.

On 28 November, according to the Army, its units carried out raids against ISIS positions in the Central Park on Sakr Island. It claimed that at least 17 ISIS fighters were killed and 24 were arrested throughout the city.

=== December 2014 ISIS offensive ===
On 3 December, ISIS launched an offensive in the direction of the Deir Ezzor military airbase. They reportedly managed to capture the al-Masemekeh Building after a suicide bomber detonated a car near it. The next day, ISIS reportedly advanced further and captured Al Mari'iyah village and also captured parts of the al-Jafra village, On 5 December, ISIS captured the al-Jafra village.

On 5 December, the Army launched a counter-attack and recaptured parts of Al Mari'iyah village and regained control of perimeter the Deir ez-Zor airbase from ISIS. The Army claimed that it had killed over one hundred ISIS militants since the start of the ISIS offensive. According to the SOHR, ISIS managed to capture some positions and military equipment on the mountain overlooking the city.

During the night of 6 December, ISIS took control over the missiles battalion to the northeast of the airport and tried to storm the airbase itself, but failed. ISIS also pulled back from the heights overlooking Deir ez-Zor after it was exposed to heavy aerial bombardment, which reportedly used chlorine. Since the start of the offensive, fifty-one soldiers and sixty-eight ISIS militants were killed.

== See also ==
- Battle of Aleppo (2012–2016)
- Battle of Deir ez-Zor (1941)
- Siege of Deir ez-Zor (1915)
