= Al-Shaitat massacres =

Islamic State massacre of the Al-Shaitat clan

- Part of Syrian civil war and the War against the Islamic State
- Location: Deir ez-Zor Governorate, Syria
- Date: August 1, 2014– August 3, 2014 (persecution continued until the Eastern Syria campaign)
- Target: Al-Shaitat clan (part of the Al-Uqaydat tribe)
- Attack type: Massacre, war crime, ethnic violence
- Weapons: Firearms, bladed weapons
- Deaths: 1,000–1,200+
- Victim: Members of the Al-Shaitat clan
- Perpetrator: Islamic State
- Assailant: Islamic State fighters
- No. of participants: Multiple coordinated massacres across several villages
- Defender: Syria
- Motive: Retaliation for the Al-Shaitat revolt following the capture of the Al-Omar oil field

The Al-Shaitat massacres were committed by the Islamic State, beginning on October 17, 2014, against members of the Al-Shaitat clan of the Al-Uqaydat tribe, in a number of villages in Deir ez-Zor Governorate in Syria during the Syrian civil war.

== Massacres ==
In August 2014, the Sunni Arab Shaitat clan, led by Sheikh Rafia Aqla Al-Rajwa, revolted against the Islamic State after it captured the Al-Omar oil field in July 2014, which was the main source of income for the Shaitat clan, which consisted of over 70,000 individuals at the time. The Shaitat clan took three towns in the eastern Deir ez-Zor Governorate from the Islamic State, where the Islamic State withdrew and then returned with reinforcements, and recaptured the towns and retaliated by targeting the clan in various towns including Gharanij, Abu Hamam, and Al-Kishkiyah. According to SOHR, the Islamic State killed nearly 700 Shaitat members in two weeks, including 100 fighters and 600 civilians, and later killed around 300 Shaitat members in one day in the village of Gharanij, while the fate of 1,800 members of the clan was unknown. The main massacres ended on August 3, 2014, with over 1,000 members of the Shaitat clan dead. Even after the main massacres ended on August 3, the persecution continued until the Islamic State were pushed out of Deir ez-Zor, with over 20 people being captured and killed every day, according to a survivor who also claimed that the number of dead Shaitat members was over 1,200.

Islamic State fighters executed members of the clan by shooting, beheading, and crucifying them. It was the bloodiest single atrocity committed by the Islamic State in Syria. The Abu Hamam area, between Mayadin and Hajin, where important members of the clan once lived, had been abandoned with many bodies that remained uncollected.

After August 3, the Islamic State allowed the Shaitat members to return to their lands and villages, on the condition that they would surrender all their weapons and follow a night curfew. Some Shaitat were conscripted by the Islamic State. In 2022, an immigrant in Germany was arrested by German authorities allegedly because he personally tortured three civilians belonging to the Sheitat clan.

In December 2014, one of the families of the Shu'itat clan returning to their homes discovered a new mass grave in the desert of the village of Al-Kashkia, and the cemetery included more than 230 bodies, some of which were beheaded. In 2020, 26 more victims were discovered in the countryside of Deir ez-Zor. 25 of them were identified by relatives, and the identity of one remained unknown. The remains of the identified were reburied in a cemetery in Abu Hamam.

The Shaitat clan fought in the Eastern Syria campaign alongside the Syrian government, and allied militias, and successfully pushed the Islamic State out of the Deir ez-Zor Governorate.

== Aftermath ==
Al-Shaitat built a monument dedicated to the massacres in the countryside of eastern Deir ez-Zor Governorate near Iraq. In 2022, in retaliation for the massacres, a member of the Shaitat clan placed a tracking device in a motorcycle owned by Maher al-Agal, and gave his location to CJTF-OIR, who eventually killed al-Agal in an airstrike. Throughout the War against the Islamic State, the Shaitat clan had been a staunch ally of the CJTF-OIR, and especially the United States. A member of the clan stated that "almost every member of the tribe is an informant against ISIS", and that whenever they assist the United States against the Islamic State, they often reject payments, claiming that they are killing Islamic State members out of pure revenge.

The Shaitat clan received funds, weapons, and training from the United States. The chiefs of the Shaitat clan spent much of the funds on charity work for survivors of the massacres, as well as buying school supplies for children of the clan. In 2023, the Shaitat clan, while still focused on quelling the Islamic State insurgency, also participated in the Deir ez-Zor uprisings against the SDF. The United States acted as a mediator in the conflict, which eventually ended.
