= Abu Maria al-Qahtani =

Iraqi Islamic militant (1976–2024)

- أبو ماريا القحطاني
- alleged photo of al-Qahtani

Personal details
- Born: Maysar Ali Musa Abdullah al-Juburi; 1 June 1976 Al-Rasif, Mosul District, Nineveh Governorate, Iraqi Republic (Ba'athist Iraq)
- Died: 4 April 2024 (aged 47) Sarmada, Idlib Governorate, Syrian Salvation Government
- Cause of death: Assassination by suicide bombing
- Education: University of Mosul

Military service
- Allegiance: See list: Ba'athist Iraq (?–2003); Fedayeen Saddam; Iraq (2004); Federal Police; Al-Qaeda in Iraq (2004‍–‍2006); Islamic State of Iraq (2006‍–‍2012); Al-Nusra Front (2012‍–‍2016); Jabhat Fatah al-Sham (2016‍–‍2017); Hay'at Tahrir al-Sham (2017‍–‍2023)
- Years of service: 2004-2023
- Rank: Al-Nusra Front and Hay'at Tahrir al-Sham commander
- Battles/wars: See list: Iraq War; Iraqi insurgency; Syrian civil war; Deir ez-Zor clashes (2011–2014); Deir ez-Zor offensive (April–July 2014); Daraa offensive (October 2014); 2014 Idlib offensive; 2015 Idlib offensive; 2017 Hama offensive; Turkish military operation in Idlib Governorate; Qalamoun offensive (May–June 2015)

Maysar Ali Musa Abdullah al-Juburi (Arabic: ميسر علي موسى عبد الله الجبوري; 1 June 1976 – 4 April 2024), also known as Abu Maria al-Qahtani (Arabic: أبو ماريا القحطاني), was an Iraqi Islamic militant who fought in the Iraqi insurgency and then in the Syrian Civil War. He was a commander and Shura Council member in Jabhat al-Nusra. He is known for his role as ideologue of the Hay'at Tahrir al-Sham.

== Biography ==
Maysar Ali Musa Abdullah al-Juburi was born on 1 June 1976 in Al-Shura in the Mosul District of Nineveh Governorate, Iraq. Prior to the 2003 US invasion of Iraq, he was a student at the University of Mosul and a member of Fedayeen Saddam. After the fall of the Ba'athist government, he joined the Iraqi Police in Mosul but later left and was eventually arrested. Following his release from prison in 2004, he joined Al-Qaeda in Iraq. While in Al-Qaeda in Iraq, he served as the head of the religious police of the organization overseeing the implementation of Sharia in areas under its control.

Al-Qahtani was sent to Syria with Abu Muhammad al-Julani in 2011 by the leadership of the Islamic State of Iraq (ISI) on the orders of Abu Bakr al-Baghdadi and served on the Shura council of Jabhat al-Nusra. While being a subordinate of ISI as it was the parent organisation of Jabhat al-Nusra, al-Qahtani was a known vocal critic of Abu Bakr al-Baghdadi and made multiple attempts for Al-Nusra Front to separate from ISI which caused a rift among members within Al-Nusra Front. It is also alleged he considered forming his own group. He was also known to be a supporter of Turkish operations in Syria even though the official stance of Hay'at Tahrir al-Sham was against the intervention. He allegedly assassinated rival leaders in Hay'at Tahrir al-Sham in an effort to support the Turkish operation.

Al-Qahtani was involved in infighting between factions as well as internal disputes in Al-Nusra Front itself, which caused him to later be dismissed from his position as general Sharia official in 2014. However, he was still very influential and close to the leadership of Hay'at Tahrir al-Sham.

In 2016, he was allegedly involved in the formation of Ahrar al-Sharqiya, which is a group composed of individuals exiled from the Deir ez-Zor Governorate, many of whom were formerly fighters from Ahrar al-Sham and Jabhat al-Nusra. The group took part in the Turkish military operation in Afrin. His involvement and affiliation with Ahrar al-Sharqiya is unknown and has been doubted by many observers and analysts. However, a commander in Ahrar al-Sharqiya, Abu Ishaq al-Ahwazi, praised Qahtani in a 2016 interview.

Al-Qahtani was jailed in August 2023 for alleged misuse of social media. He was released in March 2024.

== Assassination ==
Al-Qahtani was killed in a suicide bombing in Sarmada on 4 April 2024, which Hay'at Tahrir al-Sham blamed on the Islamic State.
