= 2014 Eastern Syria offensive =

Offensive front launched by ISIL against Syrian military installations

- Part of the Syrian Civil War
- Territorial control before and after the offensive. (Dotted lines denote frontlines prior to the offensive) Syrian Army control Opposition control (including al-Qaeda in the Levant) Kurdish control Islamic State control Ongoing confrontations or unclear situation
Date	23 July – 28 August 2014 (1 month and 5 days)
Location	Eastern Syria
Result	Decisive ISIL victory; Major SAA retreat
Territorial changes	ISIL captures Division 17, Brigade 93, Artillery Regiment 121 and Al-Tabqa airbase; The Syrian Army recaptures five villages south of Al-Hasakah city from ISIL and repels attempted ISIL assaults on Kuweires Military Airport; Shared control of Al-Hasakah city between the Syrian government and Kurdish forces is established; The Syrian Army repels three ISIL attacks on Al-Tabqa airbase, before retreating from the base

Belligerents
Islamic State	(Syria) Syrian Arab Republic; Syrian Army; Syrian Air Force; National Defence Forces; Rojava; People's Protection Units; Syriac Military Council (MFS)

Commanders and leaders
Abu Bakr al-Baghdadi (Caliph of ISIL); Abu Ali al-Anbari (ISIL governor of Syria); Abu Omar al-Shishani (ISIL general military commander); Amer al-Rafdan (ISIL governor of Deir ez-Zor); Ali Moussa al-Shawakh (Army of Raqqa commander); Abu Osama al-Tunisi (Army of Aleppo commander) Abu Jandal al-Kuwaiti (Knights Battalion commander)	Brig. General Suleiman Dhaher (commander of Division 17); Brig. General Hasham al-Sha'arani † (Division 17); General Mozid Salama (commander of Artillery Regiment 121); Sipan Hamo (YPG commander-in-chief) Gewargis Hanna (MFS commander)

Units involved
Military of ISIL; Army of Raqqa; Army of Aleppo; Army of Hasakah; Knights Battalion	Syrian Army; 17th Division; 93rd Armored Brigade; 121st Artillery Regiment; 137th Mechanized Brigade; 123rd Mechanized Brigade; Syrian Air Force; 12th Attack Squadron (MiG-21MF/UM); 24th Helicopter Brigade (Mi-8)

Strength
1,400–1,440+ fighters; 600–640 fighters (Division 17 assault); 800 fighters (Al-Hasakah province)	1,400 (Al-Tabqa air base); 16 MiG-21MF/UM (Al-Tabqa air base); 7 Mi-8 (Al-Tabqa air base)

Casualties and losses
456–586+ killed	Syrian government: 544+ killed 32 missing 10+ captured 1 MiG-21MF/UM; YPG: 5+ killed

The 2014 Eastern Syria offensive was launched by the Islamic State (ISIL or IS) against government-held military installations in eastern Syria during the Syrian Civil War, after the group has expelled the Syrian rebels from the region. The offensive is considered to be the largest military attack against the Syrian government launched by ISIL since its establishment. It is also considered to be a reaction to Syrian Army military operations against ISIL positions in eastern Syria.

== The offensive ==
=== Raqqa, Al-Hasakah, and Aleppo assaults ===
Late in the evening on 23 July, a 640-men strong Islamic State assault force (of which 40 were infiltrators) launched an attack on the Division 17 base, north of Raqqa, from three sides. The attack began with two suicide attacks. Both were thwarted by the defenders before they could reach their targets. However, the explosions did leave 19 soldiers dead. The next day, just hours after the attack on Division 17 started, ISIL launched an attack on the Regiment 121 base (known as the Melbiya Regiment), south of Al-Hasakah, and the Panorama checkpoint at the southern entrance to the city. According to some reports, ISIL militants breached the base and killed General Mozid Salama along with 20 of his men. A Syrian Army official denied this claim. At the same time, four infiltrators disguised as NDF members attacked the Ba'ath party building in Al-Hasakah, killing a high-ranking Ba'ath Party political leader. The four ISIL infiltrators eventually blew themselves up, killing a total of 12 people.

During the night of 25 July, a suicide car-bomb was detonated at the Panorama checkpoint, killing five soldiers. Meanwhile, clashes at the southern perimeter of Al-Hasakah city killed three YPG fighters, while 11 Syrian soldiers (including an officer) died while defending the Artillery Regiment 121 base. 17 ISIL fighters were also killed near the base.

On 26 July, ISIL took control of Division 17 after government forces retreated, following two days of fighting. Hundreds of troops retreated from the base towards Brigade 93 and nearby villages. Three groups were pulled out, while one group stayed behind to cover the retreat. One of the retreating groups got ambushed by ISIL, but two other groups, numbering hundreds of soldiers, reached Brigade 93 that day. 300 other soldiers were still held up in the village of Al Rahyat. 50 soldiers from the ambushed group were captured and summarily executed. Overall, 85 soldiers were killed in the battle for Division 17. The fate of 200 others remained unknown, according to the Syrian Observatory For Human Rights (SOHR). Some of the executed Syrian soldiers were paraded in the city of Raqqa, where the heads of soldiers were put on poles. 28 ISIL fighters were also killed during the takeover of Division 17.

On the same day, ISIL forces penetrated the besieged Kuweires Airbase, east of Aleppo, and captured parts of the airport campus.

In the evening, it was reported that ISIL managed to capture large parts of Artillery Regiment 121 base, and by the next day, according to SOHR, had fully taken control of the base. However, according to Kurdish sources, government troops recaptured the base after ISIL forces retreated under heavy artillery fire. It was also reported that YPG units seized weaponry from the SAA in Hasakah city, while YPG fighters and Syrian soldiers set up joint patrols in the southern parts of Al-Hasakah to prevent ISIL taking control of the city. According to the state news agency SANA, the military recaptured the Penitentiary center for teenagers, the Martyrs Cemetery and the al-Ahrash area on the southern outskirts of Hasakah.

Meanwhile, dozens of government soldiers, fleeing from the captured Division 17, reached the Al-Thawrah air base, also known as Al-Tabqa. Also during this time, ISIL forces retreated from the Kuweires Airbase due to heavy shelling.

=== Syrian Army counterattack ===
On 31 July, ISIL fighters retreated from the Al Mashtal area towards Mafraq Sediq, 7 kilometers west of Al Hasakah city, because of potential shelling by government forces. Meanwhile, ISIL itself shelled Al Hasakah with mortars, leaving three people dead.

On 1 August, the military counter-attacked and ISIL forces retreated from areas south-east of Al Hasakah city. Government troops captured the villages of Al Homor, Al Slaleyyi, Al Fallaha, Al Ma’ruf and Al Maqbara, eventually reaching the old junction of Al Shaddadi during the advance.

=== Further ISIL advances ===
After overnight clashes that started with a triple suicide bombing, on 7 August, ISIL forces captured large parts of the Brigade 93 base. The next day, ISIL was in full control of the base and started preparing to attack Al-Tabqa air base, the last government stronghold in Raqqa province. In the past, different rebel groups besieged the Al-Tabqa air base at different time periods. On 25 November 2013, they had shot down a government helicopter outside the base, killing all of its crew members.

By this time, the number of confirmed soldiers killed at Division 17 was updated to 105, while another 140 soldiers remained missing. 108 of the missing soldiers arrived at the air base on 14 August.

On 8 August, ISIL repelled a Kurdish and Syrian Army attempt to recapture the Geweran neighbourhood of Hasakah city through the Beiruti bridge.

=== Battle of Al-Tabqa airbase ===
Around 10 August 2014, ISIL started to continuously attack Al-Tabqa airbase.

After two weeks of fighting, and several repelled ISIL assaults, on 24 August, ISIL fighters breached Al-Tabqa airbase and took control over large parts of the airbase. This attack occurred when the Army was already retreating from the base to the Ithriya area, leaving a small garrison behind. The base was eventually captured that day.

In the final assault, 170 Syrian soldiers were killed, while since the start of the battle, 346 ISIL fighters and 195 Syrian soldiers had been killed. The number of dead soldiers was later updated to 200. Another 150 soldiers were reportedly captured, while 700 soldiers managed to retreat.

=== Mohasan and Mansoura Dam ===
On 28 August 2014, Syrian fighter jets launched a precise airstrike on an ISIL headquarters in the city of Muhasan, during a meeting between military leaders and sharia judges. The attack resulted in the death of most leaders inside (numbering six), while others were wounded. Another airstrike occurred the same day against an ISIL camp near Mansoura Dam, killing and wounding dozens of militants. According to SOHR, ISIL executed 160 Syrian soldiers between 27 and 28 August. At the beginning of October, 29 missing soldiers from the Brigade 93 base managed to reach the Army headquarters at Al-Hasakah city.

== Aftermath ==
An ISIL training camp in Eastern Syria was bombed by the Syrian Air Force on 14 September, resulting in 17 ISIL casualties. The next day, Syrian special forces and Syrian Army engineers blew up the Political Bridge in Deir ez-Zor, killing all the militants who were on it. ISIL thus lost the only available land route to move into parts of the city it controlled. Supplies from then on had to be delivered by boats.

== See also ==
- Deir ez-Zor clashes (2011–2014)
- Siege of Deir ez-Zor (2014–2017)
- Battle of the Shaer gas field
- Siege of Kobanî
- Palmyra offensive (May 2015)
- 2014 Islamic State offensive in Iraq
- Northern Iraq offensive (August 2014)
- Eastern Syria campaign
