= Timeline of the Syrian civil war (September–December 2017) =

The following is a timeline of the Syrian Civil War from September to December 2017. Information about aggregated casualty counts is found at Casualties of the Syrian Civil War.

== September 2017 ==
=== 1 September ===
- Syrian Democratic Forces (SDF) seize full control of the Old City in Raqqa from the Islamic State (ISIL).

=== 2 September ===
- The Russian Aerospace Forces report that they destroyed a large convoy of twelve ISIL trucks with ammunition and weapons in Deir ez-Zor Governorate.
- The British Ministry of Defense claimed that British troops had left Syria in late June 2017 and halted their FSA training program.

=== 3 September ===
- Syrian Army (SAA) forces capture the city of Uqayribat from ISIL, the last stronghold of the group in the Hama Governorate.

=== 5 September ===
- The Syrian Army, aided by Iranian-backed militias, as well as by Russian advisers and Russian airstrikes, break the three-year siege of the city of Deir ez-Zor by ISIL by reaching the Brigade 137 desert base.
- In conjunction with the Deir ez-Zor offensive, Russian frigate Admiral Essen in the Mediterranean Sea launches cruise missiles at ISIL targets near Deir ez-Zor, killing many fighters an destroying command and communications posts, ammunition depots, and repair facilities for armored vehicles.

=== 6 September ===
- The United Nations Commission of Inquiry on Syria issues its report on the April 2017 Khan Shaykhun chemical attack. They report that it was the gravest of 27 chemical attacks by the Assad government.
- Staffan de Mistura, the U.N. special envoy for the Syrian conflict says that the Syrian opposition must accept that it has "failed to win the war", but also that the government "cannot announce victory".

=== 7 September ===
- Israeli jets bomb a suspected chemical weapons depot near the city of Masyaf, Hama Governorate, killing at least two Syrian Army (SAA) soldiers.

=== 9 September ===
- The SAA breaks the nine month-long siege of Deir ez-Zor Airport by ISIL.
- The Syrian Democratic Forces (SDF) announce an offensive against ISIL in the north of the Deir ez-Zor Governorate.

=== 10 September ===
- Syrian Democratic Forces claim they advanced 50km and reached an industrial zone miles to the east of Deir ez-Zor city as part of their offensive against ISIL in the northern and eastern parts of the Deir ez-Zor province, while pro-government forces regained full control of the highway from Deir ez-Zor to Damascus, putting SDF and pro-government forces within 15km of each other.
- At least 34 civilians, including nine children, are killed in a Russian air raid on Euphrates River ferries near Deir ez-Zor city, according to the Syrian Observatory on Human Rights (SOHR).

=== 11 September ===
- Russian warplanes continue with their aerial campaign on the eastern province, with at least 19 civilians killed in an airstrike on the ISIL-held village of al-Khrayta, near Deir ez-Zor city on Monday, AFP reports. SOHR says that “Two sets of strikes 30 minutes apart hit civilians sheltering in tents along the Euphrates and boats on the river”.
- Hezbollah Leader Hassan Nasrallah declares that the ´Syrian war is won´.

=== 13 September ===
- At Russia's request, US air forces allow a convoy carrying ISIL fighters to reach al-Mayadin in ISIL-held territory in eastern Syria after being bused from the Lebanese border as part of an evacuation agreement brokered by Hezbollah and the Syrian government.

=== 14 September ===
- A US-led Coalition spokesman states that the Coalition-backed SDF forces will not go into Deir ez-Zor city, but will leave it clear to Russian and government forces.

=== 15 September ===
- The representatives of Iran, Russia and Turkey reach an agreement for the implementation of a “de-escalation zone”, in the Idlib Governorate. Turkish government-linked Yeni Safak newspaper says in an unsourced report that the three countries plan to divide the Idlib region into three, with Turkish forces and opposition fighters in the northwest region bordering Turkey. The deal takes place amid pro-government media reports that "around 9,000 militants" from Jabhat Fateh al-Sham attempt to wrest control from other rebel groups.
- Ahmad Abu Khawla, commander of the SDF's Deir ez-Zor Military Council, states that it will not allow Syrian government forces to cross the Euphrates.

=== 16 September ===
- Russian aircraft reportedly bombs SDF positions on the eastern bank of the Euphrates, injuring six SDF fighters, according to US-led Coalition sources. Russia denies responsibility.

=== 17 September ===
- SAA troops seize a suburb of the city of Deir ez-Zor, cornering ISIL forces there with the intention of encircling them.

=== 18 September ===
- SAA forces cross the Euphrates river in the Deir ez-Zor Governorate.

=== 19 September ===
- Rebels led by HTS launch an offensive in Hama and Idlib against the government and its allies, code-named “Oh Servants of God, Be Steadfast”.

=== 20 September ===
- Syrian Tiger Forces advance against ISIL in the northwest Deir ez-Zor Governorate as Syrian troops close in on southeast Raqqa Governorate, according to a military source close to the government; the towns of al-Tabni, al-Turayif, al-Buwytiyah, Khan Zahra and al-Masrab are captured from ISIL forces.

=== 21 September ===
- Russian and Syrian warplanes launch airstrikes in the south of Idlib, killing three civilians and wounding several others.
- A prominent Syrian opposition activist, Orouba Barakat, and her journalist daughter, Hala Barakat, a US citizen, are found dead in their Istanbul apartment late Thursday.

=== 22 September ===
- The SOHR report an agreement between the Syrian Army forces and ISIL militants on the East Hama region. The truce includes the evacuation of ISIL members and their families out of the villages they control. This follows 18 days of clashes that have left over 305 ISIL fighters and 138 pro-government forces dead.

=== 23 September ===
- There are multiple Russian airstrikes in Hama Governorate and Idlib Governorate, including the targeting of a Faylaq al-Sham headquarters in the area of Tal Mardiqh - killing over 50 fighters according to rebel sources and attacks on Khan Sheikhoun, Jisr al-Shaqour, Saraqeb and Kafr Sajna.
- The SDF captures the Conoco gas field, a major gas field in Deir ez-Zor Governorate, from ISIL.

=== 24 September ===
- Syrian government media and SOHR report rebel shelling of President Assad's hometown Qardaha.
- SOHR report heavy shelling and 40 deaths in the Idlib countryside.
- Russian lieutenant general, Valery Asapov, is killed by mortar fire from ISIL near Deir ez-Zor.

=== 25 September ===
- The Syrian government reports that rebel shelling of Qardaha continue, while SOHR, Syria Civil Defence and other sources in rebel territories report major government and Russian airstrikes in Idlib governorate, with at least 37 people in the town of Jisr al-Shughour and nearby areas. Russia denied it had bombed any civilians.
- SDF forces say Russian warplanes struck their positions in the Conoco gas field in Deir ez-Zor Governorate, killing one and wounding two, although Moscow denies the claims.

=== 26 September ===
On September 26 2017, at 12:06 a.m., Tu-95MS strategic bombers fired cruise missiles in Syria.

- The Syrian government says it will consider allowing some autonomy for Kurdish regions.

=== 27 September ===
- Russia conducts airstrikes on the villages of Qaina and Yaqobia, killing a child and injuring 5 more.
- The city of al-Tamane'a is bombarded by five Russian warplanes with rockets, bombs and missiles wounding several and forcing others to flee.

=== 28 September ===
- Russian President Vladimir Putin holds talks with Turkish President Recep Tayyip Erdogan in Ankara, Turkey to discuss the setup and monitoring of a combat-free zone in Syria.
- ISIL releases audio of their leader, Abu Bakr al-Baghdadi urging his followers to attack against "crusaders and apostates".

== October 2017 ==
=== 1 October ===
- The Islamic State seizes the town of Al-Qaryatain in the province of Homs in a surprise attack against government forces.

=== 2 October ===
- At least 10 people are killed and 20 are injured in a twin suiciding bombing on a police station in the Al-Midan neighborhood in Damascus.

=== 3 October ===
- ISIL releases a video of two Russian soldiers they claim to have captured. However, Russia denies that they are their soldiers.

=== 4 October ===
- Suspected Russian fighter jets target rubber dinghies and family boats fleeing the town of Al-Ashara, killing at least 60 civilians.
- Russian defence minister Igor Konashenkov claims that ISIL have undertaken several attacks on Syrian cities through US-controlled areas.
- Human rights group, Physicians for Human Rights, accuses the Russian and Syrian governments of attacking hospitals since April despite the "de-escalation" zones being agreed on. They also accuse them of sending jets to raid three hospitals in September in the rebel-held Idlib province.

=== 6 October ===
- The SOHR states that Russian airstrikes killed at least 14 civilians including three children as they crossed the Euphrates river near ISIL-held Mayadin while fleeing the village of Mahkan.
- Jaysh al-Islam militants launch a successful attack on the East Ghouta region in Damascus, regaining territory they lost to the Syrian government.

=== 10 October ===
- A Russian Air Force Sukhoi Su-24 crashes at the air base of Khmeimim in the Latakia province, killing both crewmen on board.

=== 11 October ===
- 2 people are killed and another six are injured when three suicide bombers blew themselves up near the police headquarters in central Damascus.
- Reports by The Sun mention that the CIA informed British intelligence agencies that British-born ISIL member, Sally Jones and her 12-year-old son were killed in a drone strike in June while fleeing Raqqa.

=== 12 October ===
- The Turkish Army, along with Turkish-backed Free Syrian Army, launch an operation in with the aim of repelling Tahrir al-Sham from Idlib.

=== 15 October ===
- The Syrian Army captures al-Mayadin, whilst more fighting takes place between the East Deir ez-Zor city and the countryside of Deir ez-Zor province.

=== 16 October ===
- Israeli jets destroy an anti-aircraft battery outside of Damascus after its planes were fired upon in Lebanese airspace.

=== 17 October ===
- The SDF capture the Islamic State's de facto capital of Raqqa after four months of fighting.

=== 18 October ===
- Major General Issam Zahreddine is killed by a land mine explosion during operations against ISIL in Deir ez-Zor.

=== 19 October ===
- The SDF have captured the al-Omar oil field, the largest oil field in Syria from Islamic State forces.

== November 2017 ==
=== 3 November ===
- Avigdor Lieberman, the Israeli Defense Minister, calls Assad 'victorious' in the Syrian civil war and recalls that former enemies now "court" him. The Israeli Minister makes these remarks at the Israeli news website Walla!.
- The SAA capture Deir ez-Zor from ISIL.

=== 7 November ===
- Civil unrest is reported in Manbij, Al-Thawrah and western Raqqa because of forced conscription of young men carried out by the SDF.

=== 8 November ===
- The SAA capture Abu Kamal, and directs its attack to the north of the city, capturing the Hamdan Military Airbase.

=== 13 November ===
- The BBC reveals that a secret deal in mid-October allowed hundreds of ISIL fighters and their families, including some of their "most notorious members", to escape from Raqqa in a convoy that was between 6 and 7 km long which consisted of 100 ISIL vehicles and over 250 fighters. The United States government confirmed that the deal with ISIL was made and that the evacuations took place.
- Atarib market massacre: A Russian airstrike kills 84 people.
- Amnesty International releases a report concluding that forces loyal to Bashar al-Assad have committed crimes against humanity through their “starve or surrender” strategy and sieges that have devastated areas controlled by the opposition.

=== 18 November ===
- At least 14 civilians, including one young girl, are killed by Syrian government bombardment of the rebel-held eastern Ghouta region near Damascus, according to SOHR.

=== 19 November ===
- The Syrian Army finally seizes Abu Kamal after an Islamic State counterattack retook the city.

== December 2017 ==
=== 11 December ===
- Russian President Vladimir Putin announces the beginning of a withdrawal from the base of the Armed Forces of the Russian Federation in connection with the recent victories over ISIL.

=== 26 December ===
- Russian Defense Minister Sergei Shoigu announces Russia has started establishing a permanent presence at its two military bases (Tartus and Latakia) in Syria.
