= Al-Masrab =

Al-Masrab المسرب
- Village
- Location within Syria
- Coordinates: 35°32′28″N 39°51′58″E
- Country: Syria
- Governorate: Deir ez-Zor
- District: Deir ez-Zor
- Subdistrict: al-Tabni

Population (2004 census)
  - Total: 4,833
- Time zone: UTC+2 (EET)
  - Summer (DST): UTC+3 (EEST)

Al-Masrab (Arabic: المسرب, also spelled al-Musareb or el-Mesereb) is a village in eastern Syria, administratively part of the Deir ez-Zor Governorate, located along the Euphrates River, northwest of Deir ez-Zor. Nearby localities include al-Tabni to the northwest, al-Harmushiyah to the north, al-Kasrah to the northeast, al-Saawah to the east and al-Shumaytiyah to the southeast. According to the Syria Central Bureau of Statistics, al-Masrab had a population of 4,833 in the 2004 census.
