= Al-Kasabi =

Al-Kasabi القصبي
- Town
- Location in Syria
- Coordinates: 35°43′57″N 39°45′39″E
- Country: Syria
- Governorate: Deir ez-Zor
- District: Deir ez-Zor District

Population (2004)
  - Total: 4,325
- Time zone: UTC+3 (AST)

Al-Kasabi (Arabic: القصبي) is a Syrian town located in Deir ez-Zor District, Deir ez-Zor. According to the Syria Central Bureau of Statistics (CBS), the town had a population of 4,325 in the 2004 census.
