= Lions of the East Army =

Syrian rebel group

- جيش أسود الشرقية; Jaysh Usud al-Sharqiya
- Logo of the Lions of the East Army.
- Leaders: General commander: Tlass al-Salama (nom de guerre: Abu Faisal); Deputy commander: Abu Barzan al-Sultani; Abdul Bari
- Dates active: August 2014 – February 2022
- Active regions: Since April 2018: Turkish-occupied northern Aleppo Governorate; Al-Tanf, US military base in Rif Dimashq Governorate; Until April 2018: Rif Dimashq Governorate; Damascus Governorate; Homs Governorate
- Ideology: See ideology section
- Size: 350 (early 2016); 450 (late 2016); 1,300 (2017)
- Part of: Authenticity and Development Front (formerly); Free Syrian Army: Southern Front (formerly); Syrian National Army
- Wars: the Syrian Civil War
- Website: Official website

The Lions of the East Army (Arabic: جيش أسود الشرقية; Jaysh Usud al-Sharqiya) was a Syrian rebel group formerly affiliated with the Free Syrian Army's Southern Front that was formed in August 2014 and was based in southeastern Syria. Many of the group's fighters were al-Shaitat tribesmen from the Deir ez-Zor Governorate. The group was also active in Damascus city between January and July 2015, when its unit in Damascus merged into Jaysh al-Islam's 8th Brigade. It mainly focused on defeating the Islamic State in the eastern Syrian Desert, where it gained control over large areas since 2016.

== History ==
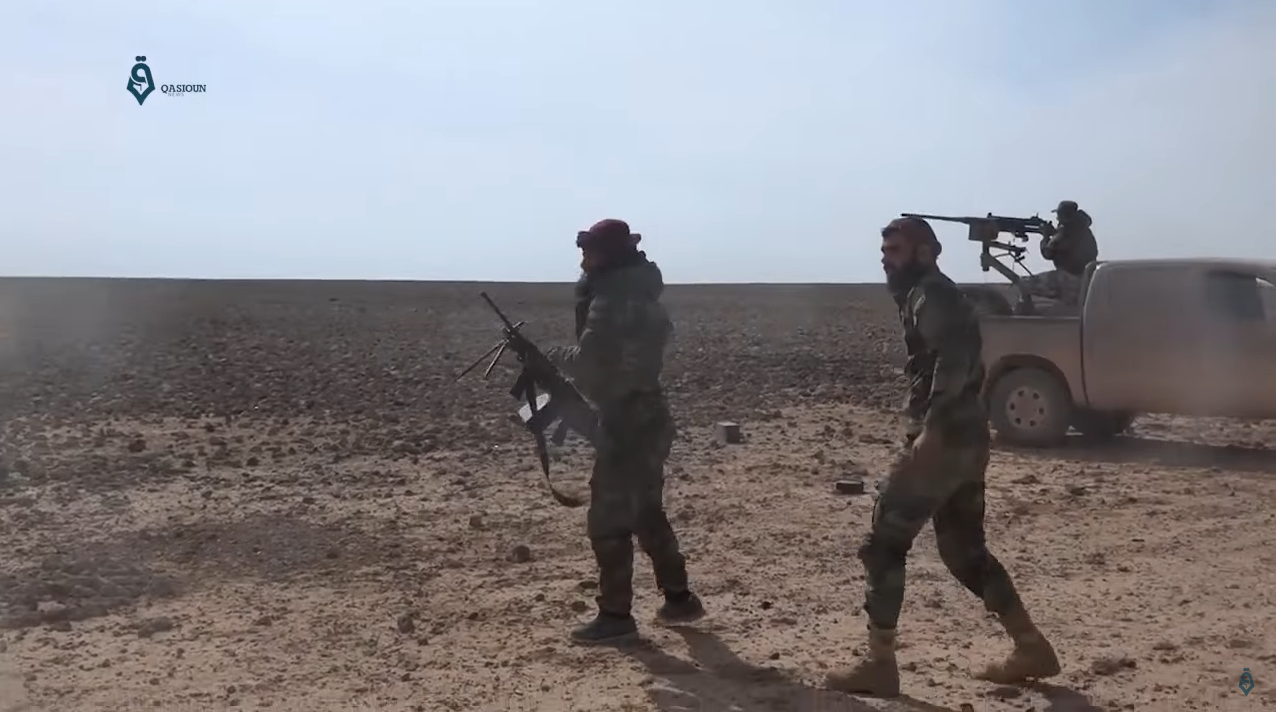
Infantrymen of the militia with a technical.

The origins of the Lions of the East Army trace back to the rebellion in Deir ez-Zor Governorate from 2011 to 2014, when several rebel groups emerged to fight against Bashar al-Assad's government. Among these was "Liwa Bashair al-Nasr" (translated: "Victory of Good News Brigade"), founded by Tlass al-Salama in 2012. Salama eventually became one of the most prominent anti-ISIL rebel leaders in the governorate, while his group became known for helping government officers and soldiers in Deir ez-Zor to defect by smuggling them to their home areas. Other notable rebel groups that later joined the Lions of the East Army were Liwa al-Qadisiyah and Liwa Omar al-Mukhtar from Abu Kamal, and Bayariq al-Shaitat, a militia formed from al-Shaitat tribal members. These groups unsuccessfully tried to resist a large-scale offensive by ISIL in mid-2014 that drove them from Deir ez-Zor Governorate. Many rebel groups, among them Salama's men, then moved into the eastern Qalamoun Mountains. There, Liwa Bashair al-Nasr merged with eleven other ex-Deir ez-Zor factions, forming the "Lions of the East Army" under Salama's leadership. The new group's name was chosen in order to retain the members' link with their eastern home areas. The army was originally a member of the Authenticity and Development Front. For a few months in 2015, the Lions had also had a presence in Eastern Ghouta in the Damascus suburbs, where Liwa Usud al-’Asima joined them and aided other local rebels in fighting the Eastern Ghouta ISIL branch. Eventually, Liwa Usud al-’Asima left the Lions of the East Army and merged with Jaysh al-Islam's 8th Brigade.

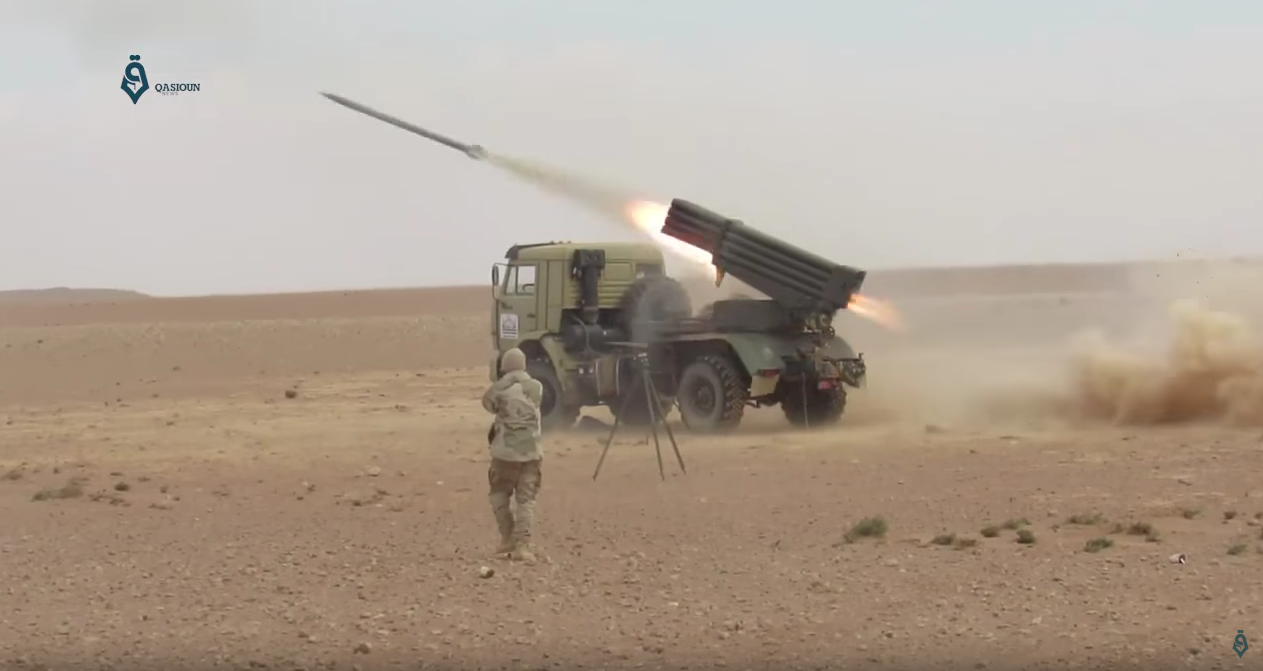
A BM-21 Grad rocket artillery truck of the group during the 2017 southern Syrian Desert campaign.

Since its formation, the Lions of the East Army has fought alongside other rebel groups against ISIL in the southern Syrian Desert and the Qalamoun Mountains, and despite reversals has managed to capture much territory. To expand its strength, Salama's group has recruited both young men from areas they have taken from ISIL, as well as former ISIL fighters who have surrendered. According to Salama, many ISIL fighters are "simple people and many had no choice" but to cooperate with the Islamist organization. The Lions of the East Army tries to "rehabilitate" ISIL members, with the group's cleric for example explaining to locals and prisoners why ISIL is not "Islamic". In late November 2015, however, many rebels from the Lions of the East Army joined the New Syrian Army. A month later the Lions left the Authenticity and Development Front, though continued to maintain a cordial relationship with it.

In June 2016, the Lions joined an ultimately unsuccessful offensive to capture Abu Kamal from ISIL. One month later, the army's positions near the Hadalat border crossing with Jordan were hit by airstrikes from the Russian Air Force. Later that year it helped countering ISIL offensive in Eastern Qalamoun, and in early 2017 was part of a large-scale rebel campaign during which they captured much territory from ISIL. As the Lions of the East Army focus its strength mostly on fighting ISIL, the group has avoided fighting the Syrian government since 2016, though it remains hostile to Assad.

In April 2018, along with other rebel groups in the eastern Qalamoun, fighters of the Lions of the East Army were evacuated to Turkish-occupied areas in the northern Aleppo Governorate, thus leaving the Southern Front coalition.

== Ideology ==
The group appears to have no unifying ideology besides aiming at overthrowing Assad's government and defeating ISIL. Some units within the Lions of the East Army had no ideological commitments at all before merging into the group, while Salama has tried to portray his own faction as secular or at least non-Islamist. Analyst Aron Lund has noted, however, that both the group's leadership as well as some units within the army were close to moderate Salafist groups, including the Authenticity and Development Front, though this may have partially stemmed from the need to raise money and obtain equipment from both regional as well as international pro-Salafist organizations. The army has, consequently, expressed anti-Iranian tendencies, having called Assad's government the "ungodly Safavid regime". In an interview in July 2017, Salama claimed that the Syrian Democratic Forces and the Syrian Arab Armed Forces are "two sides of the same coin".

== Organization ==
=== Structure ===
The Lions of the East Army is led by Tlass al-Salama (also known as "Abu Faisal"), with his deputy being Abu Barzan al-Sultani. Although the army came into existence as a merger of 12 rebel factions, with more units such as the Lions of Sunna Brigade joining later, these groups have fully integrated into the organization and abandoned their individual identities. The militias that have joined the army are:

- Lions of Sunna Brigade (originally from Deir ez-Zor, not to be mistaken for Daraa based Lions of Sunna Brigade)
- Lions of Umayyad Brigade
- Qadisiya Brigade
- Bayariq al-Shaitat
- Descendants of Aisha Battalion
- Abu Ubaidah ibn al-Jarrah Battalion

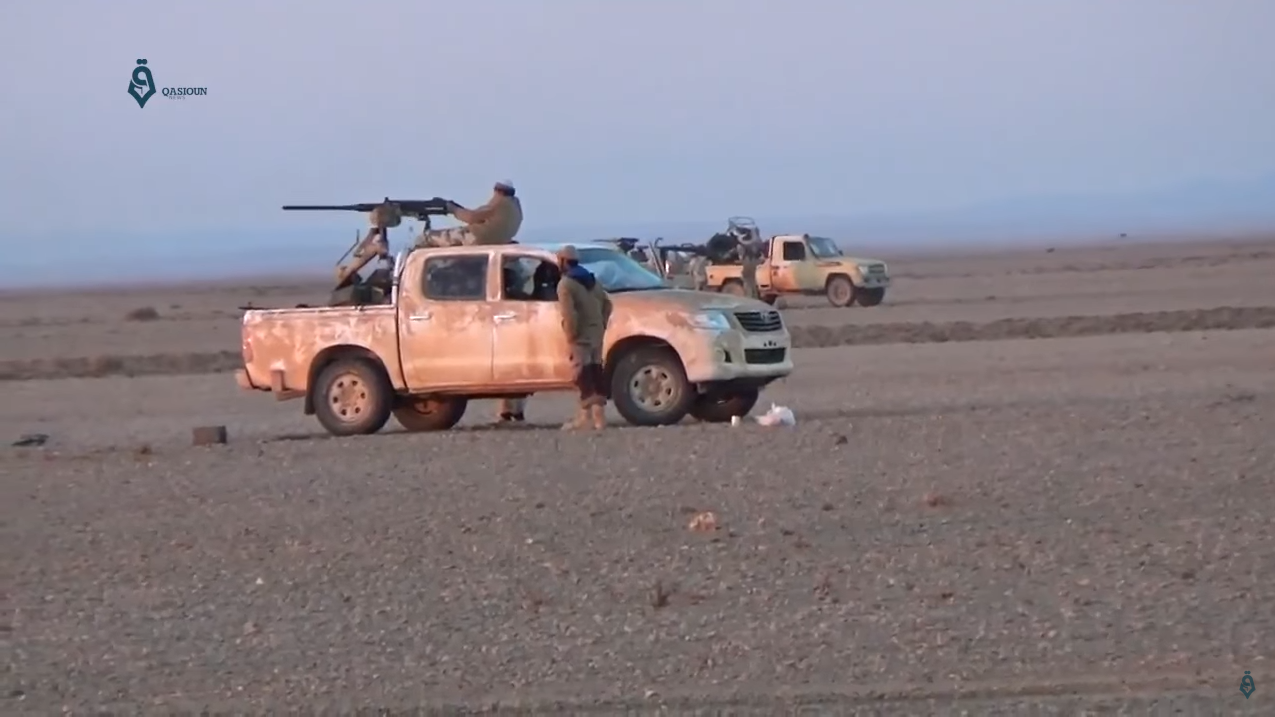
Technicals in service of the Lions of the East Army.

- Hamza Battalion
- Son of al-Qaim Brigade
- Mujahid Omar Mukhtar Brigade
- Bashair al-Nasr Brigade
- Ahwaz Brigade
- Shield of the Ummah Brigade
- Conquest Brigade
- Abd Allah ibn al-Zubayr Group
- Commandos of the Desert Brigade (former, defected to the Syrian Army)
- Lions of the Asima Brigade (former, later joined the 8th Brigade of Jaysh al-Islam)

The Lions of the East Army divides its operations into two sectors, one for Eastern Qalamoun and one for the desert. By August 2017, around 100 fighters of the group were left in the Eastern Qalamoun, surrounded by government forces.

Since its formation, the group has tried to adapt to desert warfare, with its commander noting the great difficulties of controlling territory and organizing logistics in the Syrian Desert. Lions of the East fighters are trained and paid a salary of $150 per month by the Military Operations Center (MOC) based in Amman, Jordan.

=== Equipment ===
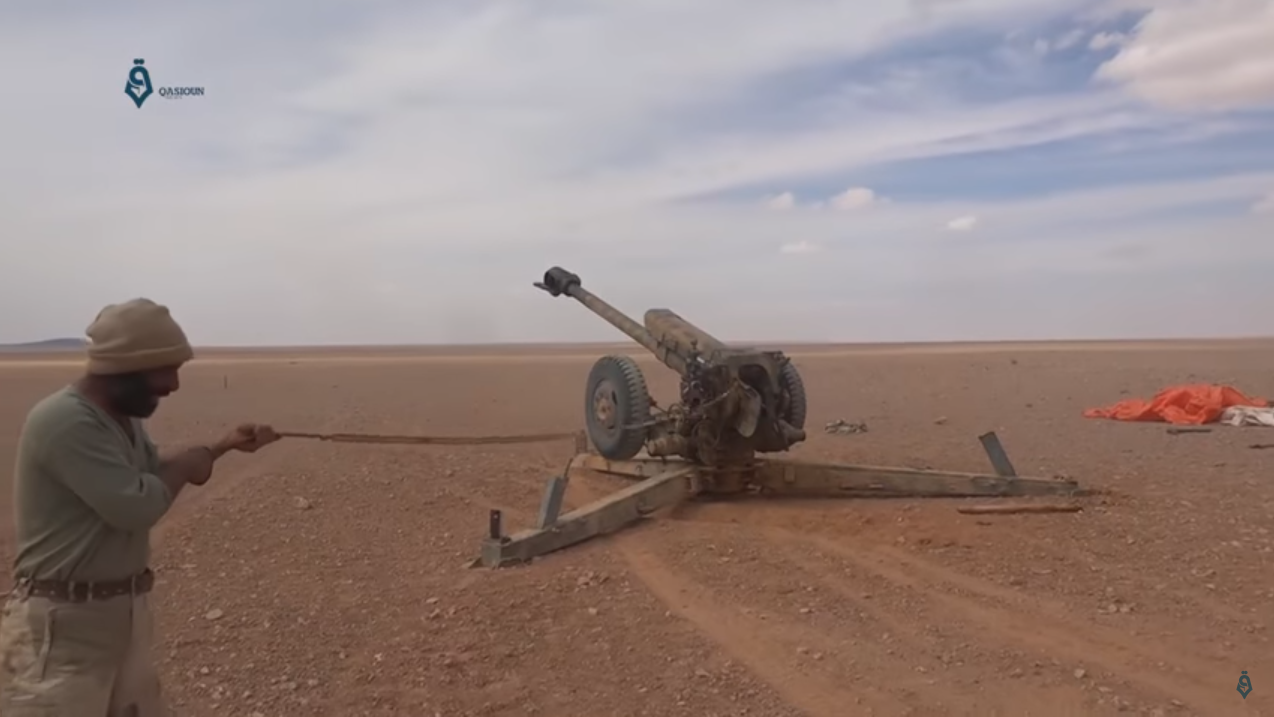
A D-30 howitzer of the group.

The army members mostly use AK and PK variants as small arms, Along with SG-43 Goryunov machine guns, and at least one M249 light machine gun, they also extensively operate technicals for transportation and as improvised fighting vehicles. The Lions of the East also possess several T-55 tanks as well as one T-62, while using AZP S-60 anti-aircraft guns and DSHK heavy machine guns along with several ZU-23-2 and BM-21 Grad rocket launchers as improvised artillery, along with 2 M-63 Plamen . Furthermore, the group captured US-made BGM-71 TOW missiles and M-16 assault rifles from ISIL in the eastern Qalamoun Mountains, but has since 2016 also received TOWs directly from the United States. Along with at least 1 9m113 Konkurs has ATGM. The group receives equipment and ammunition from the "al-Muk Operation Room" based in Jordan, although a CIA program to support it and other rebel groups was suspended in the same month.

== See also ==
- List of armed groups in the Syrian Civil War
