= Arab Ahwaz Brigade =

Syrian rebel group

- Leader: Lt. Abu Isaac Al-Ahwazy
- Dates active: March 2011-Unknown
- Groups: Al-Suna and Jama'a Battalion
- Size: 7-58 men 1 vehicle (2011); 800 (post 2011)
- Part of: Free Syrian Army: Lions of the East Army (until 2019); Syrian Democratic Forces (from 2019)
- Wars: the Syrian Civil War

The Arab Ahwaz Brigade was a Free Syrian Army rebel group from Syria's eastern Deir ez-Zor Governorate that also held a presence in other parts of northern Syria including in the Idlib and Aleppo Governorates. Although the group name was chosen to show solidarity with Iran's Ahwazi Arabs (an ethnic group in conflict with Iran), the Arab Ahwaz Brigade claimed to consist only of native Syrians with no foreign fighters.

== Background ==
The group was originally founded in March 2011 by a defector from the Syrian Army named Ayesh Al-Abdullah, who was from the town of Briyha (which is near the city of al-Busayrah), along with 7 local tribesmen. It eventually grew to 58 fighters, a majority of whom had military experience and training with Syria's armed forces, who were divided into 8 battalions.

The group financed itself by stealing cars and capturing equipment from government forces. Later, it also distributed aid to locals, winning public support. One of the group's founding members claimed the group received support from Kuwait, Qatar, Turkey, and Germany as well as Deir ez-Zor natives living abroad, and built ties with smuggling networks in neighboring Iraq to sustain itself. The Turkish government also reportedly gave medical care to fighters wounded from the group; one fighter from the group was treated in Turkey after sustaining near-fatal injuries in combat and later joined ISIL.

The group also contained Kurdish members, thought it clashed with the Kurdish People's Protection Units in the Hasakah Governorate. It also reportedly held meetings with local Kurdish factions to convince them to join the opposition against the Syrian government, but were rejected and treated with suspicion.

300 fighters from the group later defected to another group known as the Islamic group fighting for truth, due to internal tensions in the Ahwaz Brigade, including claims that the leadership was giving better salaries to his relatives and friends in the group.

=== Naming ===
The group was named in solidarity after the Ahwazi Arabs in Iran, since they viewed the Ahwazi Arab conflict with Iran's government as being related to the conflict in Syria.

=== Composition ===
The group was made up of native Syrians and contained fighters associated with the Al-Bkayyer tribe in Deir ez-Zor. It also contained a strong presence in Markada in the Hasakah Governorate.

== History ==
The group was formed in March 2011, after several armed individuals clashed with government forces in Deir ez-Zor and ran them out of villages, seizing their equipment.

On 18 November 2012, a fighter from the group was killed fighting government forces in the Idlib Governorate.

In January 2019, the group's founder was killed by an IED planted by ISIL in Deir ez-Zor, after he reportedly joined the Syrian Democratic Forces and became involved with its Deir ez-Zor Military Council, serving as a leader in the council.

== See also ==
- Army of Revolutionaries
- Liwa Jund al-Haramain
- Liwa Umana al-Raqqa
