= Al-Jalaa =

Al-Jalaa ٱلْجَلَاء
- Location within Syria
- Coordinates: 34.632043°N 40.830081°E
- Country: Syria
- Governorate: Deir ez-Zor
- District: Abu Kamal
- Subdistrict: al-Jalaa

Population (2004 census)
  - Total: 9,171
- Time zone: UTC+2 (EET)
  - Summer (DST): UTC+3 (EEST)

Al-Jalaa (Arabic: ٱلْجَلَاء, romanized: al-Jalāʾ) is a small city in eastern Syria, administratively part of the Deir ez-Zor Governorate, located along the Euphrates River, south of Deir ez-Zor. Nearby localities include al-Abbas to the west, al-Ramadi and Abu Kamal to the south and Kharayij and Hajin to the north. According to the Syria Central Bureau of Statistics, al-Jalaa had a population of 9,171 in the 2004 census. It is the administrative center of a nahiyah ("subdistrict") of the Abu Kamal District. The al-Jalaa subdistrict consists of six towns which had a collective population of 29,255 in 2004.

Al-Jalaa is the administrative center of Nahiya al-Jalaa of the Abu Kamal District.

In the Syrian Civil War the city was occupied by ISIL until the Syrian army captured it on 5 December 2017.
