= Al-Ghbrah =

Al-Ghbrah الغبرة
- Town
- Location in Syria
- Coordinates: 34°32′16″N 40°54′45″E
- Country: Syria
- Governorate: Deir ez-Zor
- District: Abu Kamal
- Subdistrict: Abu Kamal

Population (2004)
  - Total: 9,748
- Time zone: UTC+3 (AST)
- City Qrya Pcode: C5169

Al-Ghbrah (Arabic: الغبرة) is a Syrian town located in Abu Kamal District, Deir ez-Zor Governorate. According to the Syria Central Bureau of Statistics (CBS), Al-Ghbrah had a population of 9,748 in the 2004 census. Al-Ghbrah was captured by Syrian Arab Army on 6 December 2017.
