= Al-Harmushiyah =

Al-Harmushiyah هرموشية
- Town
- Location within Syria
- Coordinates: 35°36′03″N 39°52′24″E
- Country: Syria
- Governorate: Deir ez-Zor
- District: Deir ez-Zor
- Subdistrict: al-Kasrah
- Elevation: 251 m (823 ft)
- Time zone: UTC+2 (EET)
  - Summer (DST): UTC+3 (EEST)

Al-Harmushiyah (Arabic: هرموشية, Harmoushieh) is a town in eastern Syria, administratively part of the Deir ez-Zor Governorate. The town is located, on the Euphrates northwest of the city of Deir ez-Zor. It is across the Euphrates from the town of Al-Tabni.

In 1961 Soviet geologists discovered very pure salt deposits near the town.

During the Syrian Civil War, the town was occupied by ISIL until the SDF captured it on 4 October 2017.

== Climate ==
Al-Harmushiyah has a desert climate. What little rain falls, falls during the winter, about 150 mm (5.91 in) annually. The Köppen-Geiger climate classification is BWh. The average annual temperature in Al-Harmushiyah is 20.2 °C (68.4 °F).
