= Al-Kishkiyah =

Al-Kishkiyah الكشكية
- Town
- Location in Syria
- Coordinates: 34°50′56″N 40°43′31″E
- Country: Syria
- Governorate: Deir ez-Zor
- District: Abu Kamal
- Subdistrict: Hajin

Population (2004)
  - Total: 14,979
- Time zone: UTC+3 (AST)
- City Qrya Pcode: C5172

Al-Kishkiyah (Arabic: الكشكية), also known as Al-Jīshīyah (Arabic: الجشجية) or Kashkiyya, is a Syrian town located in Abu Kamal District, Deir ez-Zor. According to the Syria Central Bureau of Statistics (CBS), Al-Kishkiyah had a population of 14,979 in the 2004 census.
