= Jameh Jameh =

Syrian Military Officer

- جامع جامع
- Born: 16 June 1954; Jableh, Syria
- Died: 17 October 2013 (aged 59); Deir ez-Zor, Syria
- Military career
- Allegiance: Ba'athist Syria
- Branch: Syrian Armed Forces
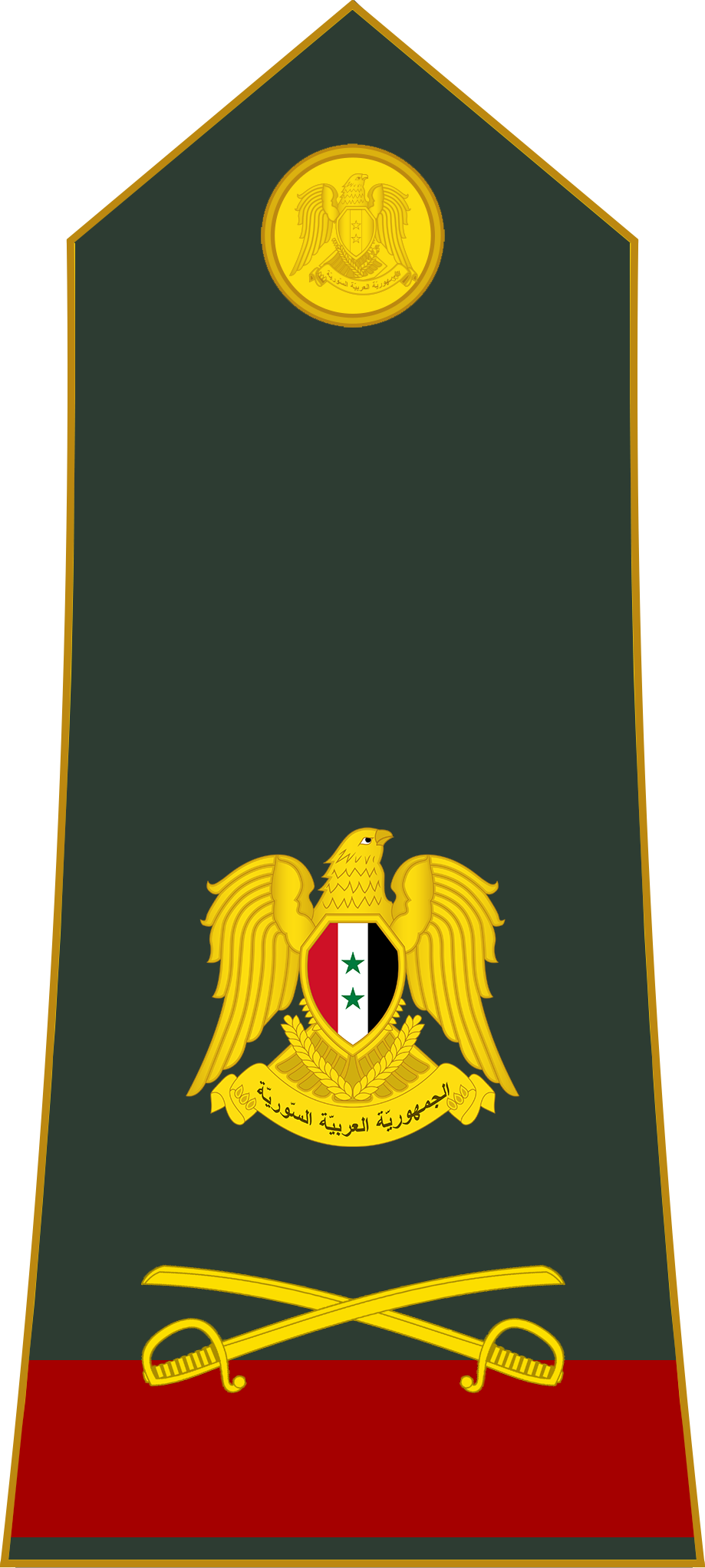
- Rank: Major General
- Commands: Head of Military Intelligence in Deir ez-Zor Governorate
- Conflicts: Lebanese Civil War; Syrian Civil War; Deir ez-Zor clashes (2011–14)

Jameh Jameh (Arabic: جامع جامع; 16 June 1954 – 17 October 2013) was a Syrian Armed Forces major general who held the position of head of Military Intelligence in Deir ez-Zor Governorate. He was killed by rebels on 17 October 2013, during the Syrian Civil War. He was likely shot by a rebel sniper in the Reshdiya neighbourhood of Deir ez-Zour city.

== Career ==
Jameh was one of Syria's senior security officers in Lebanon in the period 1976–2005. He has been accused to have a role in the assassination of former Lebanese Prime Minister Rafic Hariri in 2005. In 2006, he was blacklisted by the US Treasury Department for his role in supporting "terrorist groups" and over the presence in Lebanon.
