= Mujahideen Shura Council (Syria) =

Coalition of Islamist rebel groups in the Syrian Civil War

Mujahideen Shura Council of the Eastern Area
- مجلس شورى مجاهدي الشرقية
- Logo of the Mujahideen Shura Council
- Dates active: 25 May 2014 – July 2015
- Groups: al-Nusra Front; Jaysh al-Islam; Ahrar al-Sham; Army of Ahl al-Sunni wall Jamaa; Authenticity and Development Front al-Qa'qa'; Jabhat al-Jihad wal-Bina; Bayarq al Shaaitat; Liwa al-Qadisiya; Army of Maoata al-Islami; Army of-Ikhlas; Liwa al-Muhajireen wal-Ansar
- Headquarters: Deir ez-Zor, Syria (Until July 2015)
- Active regions: Syria
- Ideology: Pan-Islamism
- Wars: the Syrian Civil War

The Mujahideen Shura Council (Arabic: مجلس شورى مجاهدي الشرقية Majlis Shūrā Mujāhidīn ash-Sharqīyah, meaning "Shura Council of the Mujahideen of the Eastern Area", also known by the Arabic acronym Mishmish) was a coalition of Islamist rebel groups in Deir ez-Zor which formed in order to fight the Islamic State of Iraq and the Levant (ISIL) during the Syrian Civil War. The leader of the coalition was killed by ISIL around 12 June 2014.

== Affiliated groups ==
- Al-Nusra Front (Deir ez-Zor branch)
- Jaysh al-Islam (Deir ez-Zor branch)
- Ahrar ash-Sham (Deir ez-Zor branch)
- Army of Ahl al-Sunni wal Jamaa
- Authenticity and Development Front (Deir ez-Zor branch - Jaysh Usud al-Sharqiya)
- al-Qa'qa'
- Jabhat al-Jihad wal Bina
- Bayareq al-Shaaitat
- Liwa al-Qadisiya
- Army of Maoata al-Islami
- Army of al-Ikhlas
- Liwa al-Muhajireen wal-Ansar

== See also ==
- List of armed groups in the Syrian Civil War
- Euphrates Islamic Liberation Front
