= The White Shroud =

- Al-Kafn Al-Abyad
- Dates active: 2014 – 2015
- Groups: Liwa al-Mujahid Omar al-Mukhtar; Liwa al-Qadisiya al-Islamiya
- Headquarters: Abu Kamal
- Active regions: Deir ez-Zor Governorate
- Ideology: Sunni Islam
- Size: Several Dozen
- Part of: Authenticity and Development Front
- Wars: the Syrian Civil War

The White Shroud was a Sunni Syrian resistance movement established in 2014 to fight the occupation of the Islamic State of Iraq and the Levant in Deir ez-Zor Governorate. It claimed responsibility for assassinations of ISIL militants and commanders, and built a presence in the area of Deir ez-Zor. The organisation lost many of its fighters in an ISIL assault on Abu Kamal in April 2014.

== See also ==
- List of armed groups in the Syrian Civil War
