= Al-Omar field =

Oil field in Syria

- Location of Al-Omar field within Syria
- Country: Syria
- Region: Northeastern Syria
- Location: Deir ez-Zor Governorate
- Coordinates: 35°9′6″N 40°34′33″E

Field history
- Start of development: 1987

Production
- Peak of production (oil): 80,000 barrels per day (~4.0×10^{6} t/a)
- Estimated oil in place: 760 million barrels (~1.0×10^{8} t)

Al-Omar field (Arabic: حقل العمر النفطي) is an oil field in Deir ez-Zor Governorate, Syria. It is located 10 kilometres (6.2 mi) north of Mayadin, east of the Euphrates river.

== History ==
Al-Omar oil field, discovered in 1986, was operated by Al-Furat Petroleum Company (AFPC), subsidiary of the Syrian Petroleum Company. It initially peaked at a production of around 80,000 barrels per day (b/d). However, due to a lack of pressure support and overproduction in the early 1990s, the field was damaged, leading to a sharp decline in output to 16,000 b/d by 1991. Water injection techniques were implemented from 1991 onwards, stabilizing production at a plateau of 60,000–70,000 b/d between 1994 and 1997. By 2008, however, production had declined again to around 20,000 b/d. In the meantime, the STOIIP was estimated at 760 million barrels.

During the Syrian civil war, the field changed hands multiple times. It fell under the control of the Al-Nusra Front and other Islamist rebels in November 2013, then ISIS in July 2014 from the Al-Shaitat clan which later resulted in a series of massacres, and ultimately the Syrian Democratic Forces (SDF) with support from the US-led Coalition in late October 2017 during the Eastern Syria campaign. Since then, the region has been targeted by pro-Iranian militias, opposing the U.S. presence in the area.

On 18 January 2026, the army of the Syrian transitional government retook the field following the SDF's withdrawal during the 2026 northeastern Syria offensive.
