= Al-Ramadi, Deir ez-Zor Governorate =

Al-Ramadi الرمادى
- Town
- Location in Syria
- Coordinates: 34°38′5″N 40°52′17″E
- Country: Syria
- Governorate: Deir ez-Zor
- District: Abu Kamal
- Subdistrict: Abu Kamal

Population (2004)
  - Total: 3,593
- Time zone: UTC+3 (AST)
- City Qrya Pcode: C5166

Al-Ramadi (Arabic: الرمادى) is a Syrian town located in Abu Kamal District, Deir ez-Zor. According to the Syria Central Bureau of Statistics (CBS), Al-Ramadi had a population of 3,593 in the 2004 census.
