= Al-Abbas, Syria =

Al-Abbas العباس
- Town
- Location in Syria
- Coordinates: 34°41′14″N 40°48′12″E
- Country: Syria
- Governorate: Deir ez-Zor
- District: Abu Kamal
- Subdistrict: al-Jalaa

Population (2004)
  - Total: 2,314
- Time zone: UTC+3 (AST)
- City Qrya Pcode: C5180

Al Abbas (Arabic: العباس) is a Syrian town located in Abu Kamal District, Deir ez-Zor. According to the Syria Central Bureau of Statistics (CBS), Al Abbas had a population of 2,314 in the 2004 census.

== History ==
During the Syrian Civil War, Al Abbas was occupied by ISIS until the Syrian Arab Army captured the town in 2017.
