= Rawa, Iraq =

City in Iraq

Rawa راوة
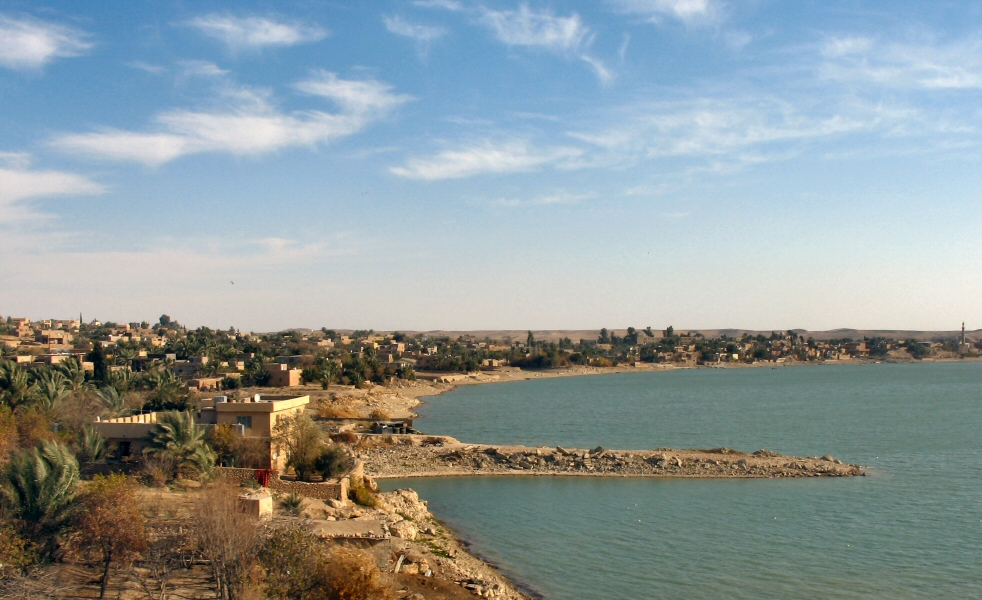

- Location within Iraq
- Coordinates: 34°28′7″N 41°55′0″E
- Country: Iraq
- Governorate: Al Anbar
- Elevation: 160 m (520 ft)

Population (2018)
  - Total: 16,674
- Time zone: UTC+3 (GMT+3)
- Postal code: 31006

Rawa (Arabic: راوة) or Rawah is a city in Iraq situated on the Euphrates river. It lies on the north bank of the river, upstream by approximately 20 kilometers (12.5 mi) from the much larger town of Anah. People from this town are known by the appellation Rawi (plural Rawiyeen) or surname al-Rawi. They are from the most honorable of the Prophet's family, and they are called by the title of nobility (sharif). Rawa is populated by Sunni Arabs.

== History ==
=== Iraqi Civil War ===
The New York Times reported in 2014 that the Islamic State in Iraq and the Levant or ISIL (also known as ISIS) controlled the town. The Iraqi offensive to recapture the city was launched on 11 November 2017, as part of the Western Iraq campaign. Iraqi forces captured Rawa on 17 November 2017. At the time of its capture it was the last town under control of ISIL.

== Twin town ==
Rawa is twinned with:

- Towamencin Township, Pennsylvania, United States

== See also ==
- List of cities and towns on the Euphrates River
