= Abu Hamam =

Abu Hamam أبو حمام
- Town
- Location in Syria
- Coordinates: 34°49′57″N 40°39′43″E
- Country: Syria
- Governorate: Deir ez-Zor
- District: Abu Kamal
- Subdistrict: Hajin

Population (2004)
  - Total: 21,947
- Time zone: UTC+3 (AST)
- City Qrya Pcode: C5174

Abu Hamam (Arabic: أبو حمام, Kurdish: Ebû Hemam) is a Syrian town located in the Abu Kamal District, Deir ez-Zor. According to the Syria Central Bureau of Statistics, the town had a population of 21,947 during the 2004 census.

== Syrian civil war ==
Abu Hamam was captured from the Islamic State by Syrian Democratic Forces (SDF) on 1 December 2017.

On 3 March 2022, a fighter with the SDF was shot dead in the town by Islamic State gunmen.

On 3 June 2022, two fighters and a smuggler were killed after SDF forces launched an anti-smuggling operation in the town.
