= Al-Rasif =

Al-Rasif الرصيف
- Village
- Location in Syria
- Coordinates: 35°30′59″N 36°19′22″E
- Country: Syria
- Governorate: Hama
- District: Suqaylabiyah
- Subdistrict: Qalaat al-Madiq

Population (2004)
  - Total: 1,689
- Time zone: UTC+3 (AST)
- City Qrya Pcode: C3205

Al-Rasif (Arabic: الرصيف) is a village in northern Syria located in the Qalaat al-Madiq Subdistrict of the al-Suqaylabiyah District in Hama Governorate. According to the Syria Central Bureau of Statistics (CBS), al-Rasif had a population of 1,689 in the 2004 census. Its inhabitants are predominantly Alawites.

As of April 2025, the village had a population of 3,011.
