= Deir ez-Zor offensive (April–July 2014) =

Campaign during the Syrian Civil War

- Part of the Deir ez-Zor Governorate campaign and Opposition–Islamic State conflict during the Syrian civil war
- Deir ez-Zor Frontline by mid-June 2014
| Date | 10 April – 14 July 2014 (3 months and 4 days) |
| Location | Deir ez-Zor Governorate, Syria 35.1556°N 40.4258°E |
| Result | Decisive ISIS victory: ISIS expels the Syrian rebels and captures most of the province |

Belligerents
| Islamic State | Syrian Opposition; Al-Nusra Front; Islamic Front; Free Syrian Army; Liwa Thuwar al-Raqqa; Liwa al-Qadisiyah; Liwa 'Umar al-Mukhtar |

Commanders and leaders
| Abu Bakr al-Baghdadi (Leader of ISIL); Abu Omar al-Shishani (Military Chief); Abu Ayman al-Iraqi (Governor of Deir ez-Zor); Abu Ruqayya al-Ansari | Abu Mohammad al-Julani (Al-Nusra Front Leader); Zahran Alloush (Islamic Front commander); Ahmed Abu Issa (Islamic Front leader) (Syrian opposition) Brig. Gen. Abdullah al-Bashir (FSA Chief of Staff); Abu Khalid al-Suri † (Ahrar al-Sham leader); Adnan Bakour † (Tawhid Brigade Leader); Abu Hussein al-Dik † (Suqour al-Sham leader) |

Casualties and losses
| 267 killed (10–11 April; 30 April – 10 June) | 414 killed (10–11 April; 30 April – 10 June) |
- 39 civilians killed (30 April – 10 June)

The Deir ez-Zor offensive (April–July 2014) was launched by the Islamic State (ISIS) against all other opposition forces in the Deir ez-Zor Governorate as part of the inter-rebel conflict during the Syrian Civil War.

After more than three months of heavy fighting, ISIS totally defeated the rebels and captured almost the whole province, except a part of the provincial capital, the military airport on its southern outskirts and a few of the surrounding towns, which remained under control of Syrian government troops, who were not involved in the inter-rebel fighting.

== Background ==
Protests against the Syrian government and violence has been ongoing in the Syrian city of Deir ez-Zor since March 2011, as part of the wider Syrian civil war, but large-scale clashes started following a military operation in late July 2011 to secure the city of Deir ez-Zor. The rebels had gradually taken control of the province until almost complete domination in mid-2013.

== The offensive ==
=== ISIS attack on Abu Kamal ===
On 10 April 2014, ISIS launched a three-pronged assault on rebel positions in and near the border town of Abu Kamal. The ISIS reportedly took parts of the town, the silos near the town and Kabajeb. The bodies of 10 rebel fighters, allegedly executed by ISIS, were found at two different sites in Abu Kamal with more reports of the summary executions of rebels by the ISIS in the area according to the SOHR. A counter-attack against ISIS positions by al-Nusra Front and its allies was reported the same day, involving the brigades Liwa al-Qadisiyah and Liwa 'Umar al-Mukhtar. On 11 April, the number of dead on both sides was raised to 86, including the brother of the ISIS Emir in Abu Kamal and the judge of a Sharia committee.

On 11 April, Jabhat al Nusra and Islamic battalions bolstered by reinforcements regained control of Abu Kamal after the ISIS was pushed out of occupied districts in less than a few hours after the takeover. ISIS pulled out to the T2 oil station on the outskirts of the city. Most of its checkpoints in the area were also removed. The SOHR confirmed the executions of seven rebel fighters belonging to the Islamic battalion during the seizure of the oil station the previous day. 26 ISIS fighters were killed in the second day of fighting with the rebel death toll rising to 60. Three Islamic fighters were also killed battling ISIS positions in the north along with one killed in Markadah.

On 13 April, fighting in the Abu Kamal area subsided as ISIS retreated to the town of Haseen. Heavy clashes were reported with rebels as ISIS made territorial gains in the north, capturing several villages previously held by the rebels. On 16 April, rebels pulled away from northern Deir ez-Zor while ISIS was pushed out of a city in the south, leaving 13 ISIS fighters dead. The same day, ISIS assassinated al-Nusra Emir in Idlib province, Abu Muhammed al Ansari.

=== Rebel counter-attack ===
By 26 April, according to rebel source, some 1,500 rebels were engaged in an offensive in Raqqa province, trying to push towards the city of Raqqa. The same source claimed that the rebels took at least five villages.

On 1 May, rebels reportedly captured the town of Al-Busayrah as well as the Al-Busayrah mound from the ISIS. The next day, ISIS fighters took the Abriha village from the rebels, but the rebels recaptured it two days later. More than 60,000 civilians have reportedly fled from towns and villages in Deir ez-Zor province due to the clashes between the rebels and ISIS. That day, the Al-Nusra Front announced that it will stop fighting ISIS as soon as the ISIS will stop its attacks on Muslims. On 5 May 69 rebels and local gunmen were killed in clashes against ISIS in Deir ez-Zor, while at least 23 ISIS fighters were killed, as well as five civilians, including the governor of the province. The As-Sabkhah village was reportedly taken by the rebels.

On 8 May, ISIS arrested hundreds of people in Deir ez-Zor under suspicion of having family members among the rebels and 20 of them were allegedly executed. Meanwhile, ISIS captured the villages of at-Tabiyah, Al-Kasrah and Hammar Ali in the province. More than 20 rebels were killed in the clashes. Several ISIS fighters were also killed. On 10 May, ISIS took complete control of western Reef Deir Iz Zor.

From 30 April until 10 May 230 fighters and several civilians were killed in the clashes between the Al-Nusra Front and ISIS in the governorate of Deir ez-Zor according to the Syrian Observatory of Human Rights; 146 of the dead combatants were those who fought against ISIS.

=== ISIS captures western Deir ez-Zor ===
Situation in Deir ez-Zor Governorate, mid-May 2014

On 11 May, an opposition source stated that since the start of the conflict 2,000 rebel fighters had been killed fighting against ISIS and 2,850 were wounded. From 10 to 11 May, ISIS was said to have gained control of important parts of eastern Deir ez-Zor province and districts of Deir ez-Zor city from rival rebel forces, opposition sources reported. ISIS reportedly executed multiple FSA fighters at a checkpoint in Al-Hisan village in Deir ez-Zor province on 11 May.

On 13 May, ISIS reportedly gained control of at least five villages in the northern countryside of Raqqa Governorate after battles with rebels; 14 rebel fighters were reported killed in the clashes. ISIS was said to have executed the military commander of the Liwa Thuwar al-Raqqa and his nephew near Ayn Issa in Raqqa Governorate.

On 16 May, ISIS launched a suicide attack on a rebel brigade's headquarters in Ash-Shuhayl town east of Deir ez-Zor; 13–14 people, mostly rebel fighters, were reported killed in the attack.

By late May, 3,000 ISIS fighters were involved in the offensive in Deir ez-Zor.

On 21 May, ISIS was reported to have gained control of the village of Al-Shulah, located in a desert oasis about 30 km southwest of Deir ez-Zor (which was previously captured by the army on 5 July 2013). A few months later, SOHR announced that warplanes carried out a raid on the area of Al-Shulah, which led to the death of 16 civilians (including ten children), when a rocket landed on a bus that was traveling to Damascus. However, Syrian state television accused ISIS of committing a "massacre" in the same place, which caused the deaths of 13 people, mostly women and children. A few months later, SOHR announced that violent clashes took place in Al-Shulah area between regime forces and IS after regime forces called for reinforcements in an attempt to advance in the area.

On 22 May, ISIS was reported to have gained control of the Al-Kharrat oil terminal; 26 Al-Nusra and rebel fighters were killed in the fighting. ISIS was said to have captured five oil stations in the Deir ez-Zor countryside since the beginning of opposition infighting.

On 2 June, ISIS took full control of Al-Busayrah east of Deir ez-Zor, while at the same time Jabhat al-Nusra and allies counterattacked, reclaiming 12 villages directly northwest and three directly east of Deir ez-Zor.

On 5 June, ISIS gained control of the entire western countryside of Deir ez-Zor after Jabhat Al-Nusra forces withdrew following an assault by Chechen and Afghan ISIS fighters. On 8 June, the FSA reportedly assassinated the ISIS emir of Homs. By 10 June, the offensive into Deir ez-Zor had expanded and ISIS had reportedly driven Al-Nusra and aligned militants from nearly all of the province north of the Euphrates.

According to SOHR, the violence since 30 April led to the death of 241 ISIS fighters and 354 rebels. ISIS also captured four oilfields.

=== Rebel defections and ISIS capture of eastern Deir ez-Zor ===
By 17 June, ISIS forces imposed a siege on rebel-held areas of the provincial capital and three days later captured three towns near the military airport.

Since the start of the offensive, the pace of defections from the opposition to ISIS had accelerated, most significantly in the town of Al-Muhasan and adjacent villages, where a mass defection by the rebel garrison granted ISIS uncontested control over a key route to the provincial capital.

On 25 June, the local unit of Al-Nusra in Abu Kamal on the Iraqi border pledged loyalty to ISIS.

On 30 June, ISIS allowed a relief convoy with aid to enter the provincial capital.

On 1 July, ISIS, bolstered by reinforcements from Iraq, routed rebels from Abu Kamal after days of fighting with opposition forces led by Al-Nusra. ISIS began advancing towards Al-Nusra's stronghold, Ash-Shuhayl, also reported to be the hometown of its leader, Ahmed al-Sharaa.

On 3 July, ISIS took control of the towns of Mayadin and Ash-Shuhayl in Deir ez-Zor province, after Al-Nusra fighters withdrew, and gained control of Syria's largest oil field, al-Omar in Deir ez-Zor province, after Al-Nusra forces fled the facility. By this point, the entirety of the province with the exception of the provincial capital, its airport, and a few villages had fallen to ISIS. Following this, ISIS captured the towns of Al-Quriyah and Buqrus, close to the town of Mayadin.

=== ISIS moves into the provincial capital ===
Situation in Deir ez-Zor Governorate, mid-July 2014

On 14 July, ISIS expelled Jabhat al-Nusra and other assorted rebel groups from all rebel-controlled neighborhoods in Deir ez-Zor city. By this stage, ISIS controlled between 95% and 98% of the Deir ez-Zor Governorate.

== Aftermath ==
The December 2014 ISIS Offensive was launched by the Islamic State of Iraq and the Levant (ISIL) on the Deir ez-Zor air base and surrounding areas in late 2014, with an aim of capturing last Ba'athist government's strongholds in the province.
