= Al-Suwar =

Al-Suwar صُوَر
- Location within Syria
- Coordinates: 35°30′23″N 40°39′42″E
- Country: Syria
- Governorate: Deir ez-Zor
- District: Deir ez-Zor
- Subdistrict: al-Suwar
- Control: (Syria) Syrian transitional government

Population (2004)
  - Total: 5,279
- Time zone: UTC+2 (EET)
  - Summer (DST): UTC+3 (EEST)

Al-Suwar (Arabic: صُوَر, romanized: Ṣuwar, also spelled as-Suwar or al-Suwwar, Kurdish: Sewr) is a town in eastern Syria, administratively part of the Deir ez-Zor Governorate, located along the Khabur river, north-east of Deir ez-Zor. In 2004, there were 5297 inhabitants.

== History ==
In the past, most scholars identified al-Suwar with Suru (Su-ú-ru), the capital city of Aramean state Bit-Halupe at the time of Tukulti-Ninurta II; however, Suru is now generally identified with nearby Tell Fiden instead. Edward Lipinski instead identified al-Suwar with the town of *Ṣūriḫ or *Ṣuwariḫ (Ṣú-ú-ri-iḫ), the first town mentioned by the king Adad-nirari II in the province of Laqe on the Khabur river.

== Civil war ==
During the Syrian Civil War, the town fell under ISIL occupation until it was liberated by U.S.-backed Syrian Democratic Forces during an offensive in September 2017.
