= Authenticity and Development Front =

Alliance of rebel groups during the Syrian Civil War

Authenticity and Development Front جبهة الأصالة والتنمية Jabhat al-'asalah wa'l-tanmiyah
- Leader: Khalid al-Hamad
- Dates active: November 2012–January 2025
- Active regions: Aleppo Governorate; Hama Governorate
- Ideology: Sunni Islamism non-political Salafism (disputed)
- Size: 13,000 (own claim) (2013); 2,200-5,000 (2015)
- Part of: Levant Front (2014–15); Mujahideen Shura Council (2014–2015) (Syrian opposition) Free Syrian Army (Syrian opposition) Syrian National Army: Hawar Kilis Operations Room (from 2017)
- Wars: Syrian Civil War

The Authenticity and Development Front (Arabic: جبهة الأصالة والتنمية, romanized: Jabhat al-'asalah wa'l-tanmiyah) was an alliance of rebel groups that was active during the Syrian Civil War. The alliance was considered to be moderate by Charles Lister (from Middle East Institute) and the BBC.

== Background ==
The coalition includes Islamists, military defectors, and former civilians. Although the alliance uses Syrian independence flags and symbols, it does not identify itself as part of the Free Syrian Army. One of the groups involved was the Nour al-Din al-Zenki Movement, which was also part of the Army of Mujahideen, though the Army of Mujahideen announced on 4 May 2014 that the Nour al-Din al-Zenki Movement had withdrawn from the coalition. The Authenticity and Development Front operated American-made BGM-71 TOW anti-tank missiles captured from the Islamic State of Iraq and the Levant.

== Member Groups ==
=== Current ===
- The White Shroud
- Unification Army
- Army of Tawhid
  - Tajamuu Alwiyat al-Iman Billah
  - Liwa Hamah al-Aqidah
  - Tajamuu Jund al-Badr Brigade 313
  - Lions of Islam Brigade
  - Talbisah Brigade
  - Falcons of Talbisah Brigade
  - Muawiyah Ibn Abi Sufyan Brigade
  - Sword of Islam Battalion
  - Tajamuu Alwiyat wa Kataib Suyuf al-Haq
- Battalions of the People of Impact
- Abd Al-Rahman Battalions
- Miqdad Bin al-Aswad Battalion
- Division 60
- Jund al-Sham

=== Former Groups ===
- Lions of the East Army
  - Liwa Basha’ir al-Nasr
- Nour al-Din al-Zenki Movement
- Liwa al-Fatah al-Mubin (Formerly part of the Allahu Akbar Battalions)
- Ibn Taymiyyah Mujahideen Brigades (Joined Ahrar al-Sham)
- New Syrian Army (Expelled from Authenticity and Development Front, continued operations as independent group)
  - Allahu Akbar Battalions

== See also ==
- List of armed groups in the Syrian Civil War
