= Al-Busayrah =

Al-Busayrah الْبُصَيْرَة
- Town
- Location within Syria
- Coordinates: 35°09′20″N 40°25′33″E
- Country: Syria
- Governorate: Deir ez-Zor
- District: Deir ez-Zor
- Subdistrict: al-Busayrah
- Control: (Syria) Syrian transitional government

Population (2004 census)
  - Total: 6,199
- Time zone: UTC+2 (EET)
  - Summer (DST): UTC+3 (EEST)

Al-Busayrah (Arabic: الْبُصَيْرَة, romanized: al-Buṣayrah) is a town in eastern Syria, administratively part of the Deir ez-Zor Governorate. The town is located, at the confluence of the Euphrates and Khabur Rivers, southeast of Deir ez-Zor. Nearby localities include Muhassan to the northwest and al-Asharah, Mayadin and Hajin to the southeast. According to the Syria Central Bureau of Statistics (CBS), Al-Busayrah had a population of 6,199 in the 2004 census. The town was known by its Latin name, Circesium, under the Roman Empire.

Al-Busayrah is the administrative center of Nahiya al-Busayrah of the Deir ez-Zor District.

During the Syrian Civil War, the city was part of the Islamic State until the Syrian Democratic Forces (SDF) captured it on 12 November 2017, bringing it under the Autonomous Administration of North and East Syria. On 6 August 2024, Syrian Army Backed Tribal Forces claimed to have captured the city amid an announced offensive in the region.

== Climate ==
In Al-Busayrah, there is a desert climate. Most rain falls in the winter. The Köppen-Geiger climate classification is BWh. The average annual temperature in Al-Busayrah is 20.2 °C (68.4 °F). About 154 mm (6.06 in) of precipitation falls annually.

Climate data for Al-Busayrah
| Month | Jan | Feb | Mar | Apr | May | Jun | Jul | Aug | Sep | Oct | Nov | Dec | Year |
|---|---|---|---|---|---|---|---|---|---|---|---|---|---|
| Mean daily maximum °C (°F) | 13.1 (55.6) | 15.9 (60.6) | 20.2 (68.4) | 25.9 (78.6) | 32.1 (89.8) | 37.6 (99.7) | 40.5 (104.9) | 40.4 (104.7) | 35.8 (96.4) | 29.7 (85.5) | 21.6 (70.9) | 14.9 (58.8) | 27.3 (81.2) |
| Mean daily minimum °C (°F) | 2.7 (36.9) | 3.9 (39.0) | 7.0 (44.6) | 11.6 (52.9) | 16.7 (62.1) | 21.5 (70.7) | 24.4 (75.9) | 24.2 (75.6) | 19.5 (67.1) | 13.9 (57.0) | 7.7 (45.9) | 3.8 (38.8) | 13.1 (55.5) |
| Average precipitation mm (inches) | 29 (1.1) | 24 (0.9) | 25 (1.0) | 22 (0.9) | 9 (0.4) | 0 (0) | 0 (0) | 0 (0) | 1 (0.0) | 7 (0.3) | 12 (0.5) | 25 (1.0) | 154 (6.1) |
Source: Climate-Data.org, Climate data
