= Al-Kasrah =

Al-Kasrah ٱلْكَسْرَة
- Town
- Location in Syria
- Coordinates: 35°33′57.82″N 39°55′1.33″E
- Country: Syria
- Governorate: Deir ez-Zor
- District: Deir ez-Zor
- Subdistrict: Al-Kasrah

Population (2004)
  - Total: 7,659
- Time zone: UTC+3 (AST)
- City Qrya Pcode: C5096

Al-Kasrah (Arabic: ٱلْكَسْرَة, romanized: al-Kasrah) is a Syrian town located in Deir ez-Zor District, Deir ez-Zor. According to the Syria Central Bureau of Statistics (CBS), Al-Kasrah had a population of 7,659 in the 2004 census.

== Syrian Civil War ==
On 8 May 2014, the town was captured by ISIL during the Deir ez-Zor offensive. The SDF, backed by American air support, would assume control of it by late 2017. Many residents fled or were forcibly expelled while the region was under ISIL control, by April of 2018 93% of the non-IDP population of the entire Al-Kasrah sub-district were recent returnees. As of 2022, the town of Al-Kasrah had a population of 5,770, a figure which includes a number of IDPs from the surrounding region.
