= Hajin =

Hajin هَجِين
- Location within Syria
- Coordinates: 34°41′22″N 40°49′51″E
- Country: Syria
- Governorate: Deir ez-Zor
- District: Abu Kamal
- Subdistrict: Hajin

Population (2004 census)
  - Total: 37,935
- Time zone: UTC+2 (EET)
  - Summer (DST): UTC+3 (EEST)

Hajin (Arabic: هَجِين, romanized: Hajīn, also spelled Hajeen) is a small city in eastern Syria, administratively part of the Deir ez-Zor Governorate, located along the Euphrates River, south of Deir ez-Zor. Nearby localities include al-Abbas to the west, al-Ramadi to the south and Gharanij to the north. According to the Syria Central Bureau of Statistics, Hajin had a population of 37,935 in the 2004 census. It is the administrative center of a nahiyah ("subdistrict") of the Abu Kamal District. The Hajin subdistrict consists of four towns which had a collective population of 97,970 in 2004. The al-Shaitat tribe is the largest tribe in the area. The Islamic State captured the town in 2014. They held control until losing it to the Syrian Democratic Forces on 14 December 2018 after a week and a half of heavy clashes and intense airstrikes by the United States-led Combined Joint Task Force – Operation Inherent Resolve international coalition, and has since been part of the Autonomous Administration of North and East Syria.

== History ==
In 1940 the anthropologist Henry Field identified Hajin as the location of the Al Bu Hardan tribal confederation, under a chief named Manawakh al Khalil. Field classified them as charid owners. A charid is described by Field as being a device used to pull water up steep banks using livestock so that it can be used for irrigation.

=== Syrian civil war ===
The city came under the occupation of the Islamic State of Iraq and the Levant (ISIL) in 2014 during the Syrian civil war. In late November 2017, Hajin became ISIL's de facto capital city after they lost their Raqqa, Mayadin, Al-Qa'im, and Abu Kamal strongholds at the hands of the Syrian government, Iraq, and Kurdish-led forces respectively.

On December 28, 2017 the Syrian Democratic Forces reached the city of Hajin and began a campaign to remove ISIL. This action was a part of the SDF's Operation Cizire Storm.

In 2018, Iraqi intelligence and some experts believed that ISIL leader Abu Bakr al-Baghdadi was hiding in Hajin, due to the concentration of ISIL forces and leadership in the city, even though there has not yet been any direct evidence that al-Baghdadi himself was present there. In March 2018, the SDF paused the campaign against Hajin in order to defend Afrin from the invading Turkish Army, but the operation resumed by 24 April 2018. On June 22, 2018, coalition forces led by the U.S. dropped leaflets on Hajin and in the Abu Khater area. On September 10, 2018, the SDF launched an offensive to take Hajin and its surrounding area. One news report estimated that around 4,000 ISIL fighters were defending the city, though other reports put the number of ISIL fighters between 1,500 and 2,500. On August 22, 2018 the Islamic State attempted a counterattack to break the siege of Hajin but was repelled. On September 11, 2018 the SDF advanced on Hajin with US-coalition support. On October 31, 2018 the SDF suspended its operation in Deir ez-Zor, including their efforts against ISIL in Hajin, as a response to Turkish attacks against SDF-held areas in northern Syria. On December 4, 2018, after resuming their offensive against Hajin the SDF entered the town and started their battle against ISIL for control of the city. On 14 December 2018, the SDF spokeswoman Lilwa al-Abdallah said that the military operations are ongoing to fully end ISIL and soon, we will celebrate the full liberation of Hajin. It said small pockets of ISIL resistance will be suppressed in the next two days. Hajin was captured in December 2018.

Hajin is the administrative center of Nahiya Hajin of the Abu Kamal District.
