= Al-Shaitat =

Sunni Arab clan

al-Shaitat الشُّعَيْطَاتُ
- Ethnicity: Arab
- Location: Upper Euphrates river basin (mainly Deir ez-Zor Governorate)
- Population: 70,000–90,000
- Language: Arabic

Al-Shaitat (Arabic: الشُّعَيْطَاتُ, romanized: aš-Šuʿayṭāt), in Standard Arabic al-Shuʿaytāt, is a Sunni Arab clan which lives in the Deir ez-Zor Governorate in eastern Syria. Its members number between 70,000 and 90,000 and it is led by Sheikh Rafaa Aakla al-Raju. Henry Field identified the Shaitat as a clan of the Aqaidat. They were the target of the Al-Shaitat massacres committed by the Islamic State in 2014.

== See also ==
- Albu Nimr
