= Al-Tabni =

Al-Tabni ٱلتِّبْنِي
- Location within Syria
- Coordinates: 35°36′21″N 39°49′7″E
- Country: Syria
- Governorate: Deir ez-Zor Governorate
- District: Deir ez-Zor District
- Subdistrict: al-Tabni Subdistrict

Population (2004)
  - Total: 7,205
- Time zone: UTC+2 (EET)
  - Summer (DST): UTC+3 (EEST)

Al-Tabni (Arabic: ٱلتِّبْنِي, romanized: at-Tibnī, also spelled al-Tibni) is a town in eastern Syria, administratively part of the Deir ez-Zor Governorate, located along the Euphrates River, west of Deir ez-Zor. According to the Syria Central Bureau of Statistics, al-Tabni had a population of 7,205 in the 2004 census.
