= Deir ez-Zor District =

Deir ez-Zor District منطقة دير الزور
- District
- Map of Deir ez-Zor District within Deir ez-Zor Governorate
- Coordinates (Deir ez-Zor): 35.33°N 40.15°E
- Country: Syria
- Governorate: Deir ez-Zor
- Seat: Deir ez-Zor
- Subdistricts: 7 nawāḥī

Area
  - Total: 14,389.6 km^{2} (5,555.9 sq mi)

Population (2004)
  - Total: 492,434
  - Density: 34.2215/km^{2} (88.6333/sq mi)
- Geocode: SY0901

Deir ez-Zor District (Arabic: منطقة دير الزور, romanized: mantiqah Dayr az-Zawr) is a district (mantiqah) of Deir ez-Zor Governorate, Syria. According to the 2004 census, the district had a population of 492,434. It is subdivided into seven sub-districts (nawāḥī). Deir ez-Zor is the administrative centre of the governorate.

== Geography ==
Deir ez-Zor is one of the three administrative districts (mantiqah) of Deir ez-Zor Governorate, alongside Abu Kamal District and Mayadin District. Located in the Euphrates River basin, Deir ez-Zor serves as the administrative centre of the governorate. It is bordered by Abu Kamal and Mayadin districts of the Deir ez-Zor Governorate and Al-Qa'im District of Al Anbar Governorate and Al-Ba'aj District of Nineveh Governorate of Iraq.

The district is subdivided into seven sub-districts (nawāḥī): Deir ez-Zor, Al-Kasrah, Al-Busayrah, Al-Muhasan, Al-Tabni, Khasham and Al-Suwar.

== Demographics ==
According to the 2004 census, Deir ez-Zor district was the most populated district in the governorate. The district had a population of 492,434, comprising 254,893 males and 237,541 females. The district had 73,519 households, with an average household size of 6.69 people. The illiteracy rate was 21.8% among males and 40.9% among females. About 14.1% of the population was self-employed, 55.2% was in paid employment, and 23.3% worked without pay. Approximately 89.39% of houses were owner-occupied.

The Deir ez-Zor sub-district had a population of 239,196, Al-Kasrah had 63,226, Al-Busayrah had 40,236, Al-Muhasan had 35,113, Al-Tabni had 48,393, Khasham had 28,718, and Al-Suwar had 37,552. According to the United Nations Office for the Coordination of Humanitarian Affairs estimate, in August 2020, the population was 160,286 people in Deir ez-Zor sub-district, 110,528 in Kisreh, 43,457 in Basira, 8,949 in Muhasan, 73,999 in Tabni, 18,126 in Khasham, and 40,692 in Sur. Deir ez-Zor was affected by the Syrian civil war which resulted in large-scale displacement of people.
