= Al-Muhasan =

Muhasan مُوحَسَّن
- Location within Syria
- Coordinates: 35°14′22″N 40°19′28″E
- Country: Syria
- Governorate: Deir ez-Zor
- District: Deir ez-Zor
- Subdistrict: al-Muhasan

Population (2004 census)
  - Total: 9,501
- Time zone: UTC+2 (EET)
  - Summer (DST): UTC+3 (EEST)

Muhasan (Arabic: مُوحَسَّن, romanized: Mūḥassan, also spelled al-Mohassan or Almu Hasan) is a town in eastern Syria, administratively part of the Deir ez-Zor Governorate, located along the Euphrates River, south of Deir ez-Zor and 120 kilometers west of the border with Iraq. According to the Syria Central Bureau of Statistics, Muhasan had a population of 9,501 in the 2004 census.

Al-Muhasan is the administrative center of Nahiya Muhasan of the Deir ez-Zor District.

In the early 1950s the Syrian Communist Party began gaining support in several Arab and Sunni Muslim towns in the country, including Muhasan which came to be locally known as "Little Moscow," in reference to capital of the former Soviet Union. In the summer of 1953 the peasant tribesmen of the al-Aqaydat tribe initiated resistance against the encroachments of a regionally powerful mercantile clan specializing in the grain trade, money lending and gas pumps and having one of their own as Minister of Agriculture. Under guidance from communist teachers in Deir ez-Zor and local communist activists from the town's primary school, the peasant musha ("collective farming") landholders formed a public company and purchased two gas pumps and two tractors with domestically raised funds, thereby ending their dependence on the wealthy clan.

== Bibliography ==
- Batatu, Hanna (1999). Syria's Peasantry, the Descendants of Its Lesser Rural Notables, and Their Politics. Princeton University Press. ISBN 0691002541.
