= Abu Kamal District =

Abu Kamal District منطقة البوكمال
- District
- Map of Abu Kamal District within Deir ez-Zor Governorate
- Coordinates (Abu Kamal): 34.45°N 40.93°E
- Country: Syria
- Governorate: Deir ez-Zor
- Seat: Abu Kamal
- Subdistricts: 4 nawāḥī

Area
  - Total: 6,807.01 km^{2} (2,628.20 sq mi)

Population (2004)
  - Total: 265,142
  - Density: 38.9513/km^{2} (100.883/sq mi)
- Geocode: SY0902

Abu Kamal District (Arabic: منطقة البوكمال, romanized: manṭiqat Albūkamāl) is a district (mantiqah) of Deir ez-Zor Governorate, Syria. Its administrative centre is the city of Abu Kamal. According to the 2004 census, the district had a population of 265,142. It is subdivided into four sub-districts (nawāḥī).

== History ==
The Abu Kamal region, corresponding to the ancient settlement of Mari located along the Euphrates, historically supported agriculture and semi-nomadic pastoralism. Archaeological and textual evidence indicates that, by the second millennium BC, communities inhabited villages along the Euphrates and Khabur rivers, practising agriculture while seasonally moving their livestock across the Jazira and Syrian steppe. These movements were largely determined by the availability of water and grazing resources, with herders migrating towards the fertile river valleys during the dry summer months.

== Geography ==
Abu Kamal is one of the three administrative districts (mantiqah) of Deir ez-Zor Governorate, alongside Deir ez-Zor District and Mayadin District. It is bordered by Deir ez-Zor and Mayadin districts of the Deir ez-Zor Governorate and Al-Qa'im District of Al Anbar Governorate of Iraq. It is located in the Euphrates River basin. The district is subdivided into four sub-districts (nawāḥī): Abu Kamal, Hajin, Al-Jalaa, and Al-Susah.

== Demographics ==
According to the 2004 census, Abu Kamal District had a population of 265,142, comprising 132,271 males and 132,871 females. The district had 28,882 households, with an average household size of 9.18 people. The illiteracy rate was 25.9% among males and 44.2% among females. About 20.1% of the population was self-employed, 35.4% was in paid employment, and 37.1% worked without pay. Approximately 92.6% of houses were owner-occupied.

The Abu Kamal sub-district had a population of 92,031, Hajin had 97,870, Al-Jalaa had 29,255, and Al-Susah had 45,986. According to the United Nations Office for the Coordination of Humanitarian Affairs estimate in August 2020, the population was 50,882 people in Abu Kamal sub-district, 110,691 in Hajin, 14,689 in Al-Jalaa, and 27,043 in Susat.
