= Deir ez-Zor Governorate =

Deir ez-Zor Governorate مُحافظة دير الزور
- Governorate
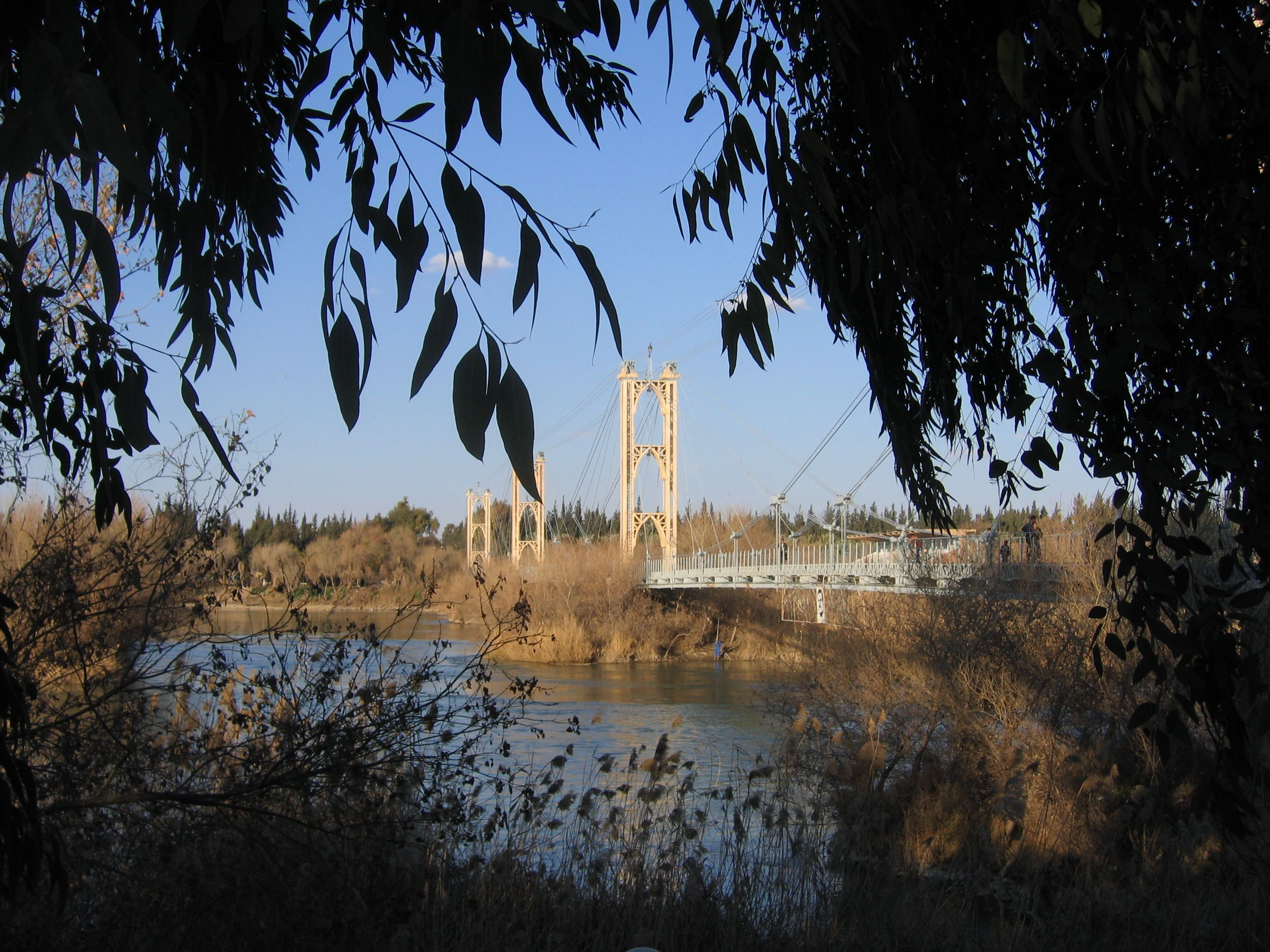
- Former Deir ez-Zor suspension bridge crossing the Euphrates

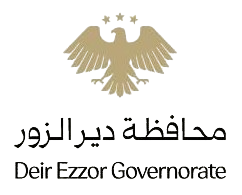
- Seal

- Map of Syria with Deir ez-Zor Governorate highlighted
- Interactive map of Deir ez-Zor Governorate
- Coordinates (Deir ez-Zor): 35.336°N 40.145°E
- Country: Syria
- Capital: Deir ez-Zor
- Manatiq (Districts): 3

Government
  - Governor: Ziad al-Ayesh

Area
  - Total: 33,060 km^{2} (12,760 sq mi)

Population (2011)
  - Total: 1,239,000
  - Density: 37.48/km^{2} (97.07/sq mi)
- Time zone: UTC+3 (AST)
- ISO 3166 code: SY-DY
- Main language(s): Arabic
- Website: deirezzor.gov.sy/en

Deir ez-Zor Governorate (Arabic: مُحافظة دير الزور, romanized: Muḥāfaẓat Dayr az-Zawr) is one of the fourteen governorates of Syria. It is situated in eastern Syria, bordering Iraq. It has an area of 33,060 km^{2} (12,760 sq mi) and a population of 1,239,000 (2011 estimate). The capital is Deir ez-Zor. It is divided roughly equally from northwest to southeast by the Euphrates.

== Districts ==
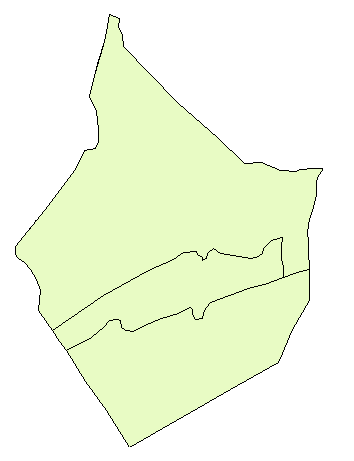

The governorate is divided into three districts (manatiq). The districts are further divided into 14 sub-districts (nawahi):

- Deir ez-Zor District (7 sub-districts)
  - Deir ez-Zor Subdistrict
  - Al-Kasrah Subdistrict
  - Al-Busayrah Subdistrict
  - Al-Muhasan Subdistrict
  - Al-Tabni Subdistrict
  - Khasham Subdistrict
  - Al-Suwar Subdistrict
- Abu Kamal District (4 sub-districts)
  - Abu Kamal Subdistrict
  - Hajin Subdistrict
  - Al-Jalaa Subdistrict
  - Al-Susah Subdistrict
- Mayadin District (3 sub-districts)
  - Mayadin Subdistrict
  - Diban Subdistrict
  - Al-Asharah Subdistrict

== History ==
On 6 September 2007, Israel attacked and destroyed a facility in the governorate that Israel claimed was a nuclear site in Operation Outside the Box. The complex was suspected of holding nuclear materials from North Korea. In 2011, the IAEA confirmed it had been a nuclear weapons site.

=== Syrian civil war ===
In the course of Syrian civil war, as the Syrian Arab Army concentrated its forces on wresting back control of Aleppo, rebels slowly gained ground in the eastern tribal heartland, aiming to control the country's 200,000 barrel-a-day oil output. In August 2012, units of the Free Syrian Army (FSA) targeted the remaining isolated outposts of the Syrian Army forces in north-east Syria, where the FSA controls all the main roads. There were said to be only three Army outposts left in Deir ez-Zor province countryside and they were under attack. On 30 November 2012, Syrian troops withdrew from Omar oil field, one of the last regime positions east of Deir ez-Zor city near the Iraqi border. This meant that the rebels controlled the country's major fields. This happened after Syrian troops lost the Conoco gas reserve on 27 November. The insurgents took control of an oil field for the first time on 4 November when they overran Al-Ward, the most important in the province. After also losing control of Al-Jofra field also in November, the army controlled not more than five fields, all located to the west of Deir ez-Zor city. Residents in Deir ez-Zor used crude oil for heating and agriculture for lack of fuel. On 1 January 2013, it was reported that two thirds of Deir ez-Zor Governorate was under rebel control.

==== Siege of Deir ez-Zor ====
On 11 April 2014, Islamic State (ISIS) withdrew from Abu Kamal to the T2 oil site, where a Syria-Iraq pipeline runs. On 3 July, the Syrian Organisation for Human Rights (SOHR) said that all towns and villages on the route from Abu Kamal to Al-Bab, passing through Raqqa governorate, were now under ISIL control. Only the provincial capital Deir ez-Zor and the military airport were outside of it. The city of Deir ez-Zor was split between al-Assad's forces and an amalgam of rebel groups. In 2014 ISIL militants massacred an estimated 900 members of the Al-Shaitat tribe in the governorate, following resistance to the group's control of the area. In early 2016, fighters from the Syrian Democratic Forces entered the governorate following the Al-Shaddadi offensive. Until October 2017, ISIL controlled all of the countryside, while Syrian Government forces held out in the capital. On 14 October 2017, Russia confirmed that Al-Mayadeen was recaptured by the Syrian army amid a major offensive. The military fully secured Deir ez-Zor city on 3 November and on 17 November 2017, ISIL surrendered the island of Hawijat Kati, bringing all areas around the city under Army control following the two-month offensive. On 23 October 2017, the Syrian troops began an offensive towards Abu Kamal, being ISIL's last stronghold in the governorate. The city was captured on 19 November 2017 after changing hands three times.

==== ISIL defeat and insurgency in Deir ez-Zor ====
During the Deir ez-Zor campaign ISIL was militarily and territorially defeated by the Syrian Democratic Forces (SDF).

In 2018, ISIL started to conduct insurgent attacks against SDF forces in Deir ez-Zor.

==== Post-Assad era ====
On 26 February 2025, four SDF fighters and eight civilians were killed in a Turkish airstrike on military positions of SDF.

The Syrian transitional government engaged in various armed altercations with the SDF in the months after the March 10 agreement, predominantly in Deir ez-Zor Governorate. On 18 January 2026, the Syrian armed forces captured the entire governorate from the SDF during the 2026 northeastern Syria offensive.

== Demographics ==
Arabs constitute about 90% of the population of the governorate, a vast majority being Sunni Muslims. About a thousand Christians live in the governorate as well.

The most significant Arab tribes are the Bu Kamal, the Shuwayt, Al-Shaitat, Bakir, Bu Kamil, Mashahda, Bu Khabour, Qaraan and Bu Hassan who all are part of the 'Egaidat confederation. Beside the 'Egaidat confederation, other tribes include the Al-Baggara, Abeed, Kul’ayeen, and Albu Saraya.

== Historic sites ==
- Dura-Europos
- Synagogue of Dura-Europas
- Dura-Europos church
- Mari
- Zalabiye
- Terqa
- Kingdom of Ḫana
- Al-Rahba
- Circesium

== See also ==
- Zor Sanjak
