= 2022 in Iraq =

- Decades: 2000s; 2010s; 2020s
- See also: Other events of 2022; List of years in Iraq

Events in the year 2022 in Iraq.

== Incumbents ==
- President:
  - Barham Salih (until 17 October)
  - Abdul Latif Rashid (from 17 October)
- Prime Minister:
  - Mustafa Al-Kadhimi (until 27 October)
  - Mohammed Shia' Al Sudani (from 27 October)

== Events ==
=== January ===
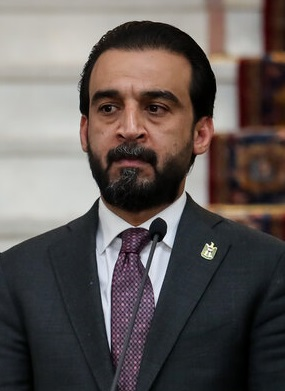
- Al-Halbousi is selected as speaker of the parliament January 10
  10 January – Newly elected Iraqi parliament meets for the first time. The session is briefly disrupted as the acting speaker fell ill and is taken to the hospital. The session resumed and Mohammed al-Halbousi is elected as speaker.
- 21 January – Diyala massacre, eleven Iraqi soldiers were killed in their barracks by IS in Al-Azim.
- 22 January – Airstrike near the ancient city of Hatra kills 3 suspected IS members including 2 leaders.

=== February ===
- 6 February – 337 ancient artifacts, which were held in a private Lebanese museum, are returned to Iraq.
- 7 February – Iraqi parliament postpones the election of the president of Iraq, amid wide boycotts of the session and corruption charges against one of the candidates. The deadlock further pushes back the appointment of a new prime minister.
- 8 February – Seven IS leaders reported to be killed in airstrikes in northern Iraq.
- 22 February – The UN Security Council votes unanimously to end Iraq’s requirement to pay reparations to Kuwait for the 1990 invasion. Iraq had previously paid more than 50 billion dollars to settle the claims of around 1.5 million claimants.

=== March ===
- 13 March – Erbil missile attacks, three killed, seven injured in missile strikes by the IRGC.
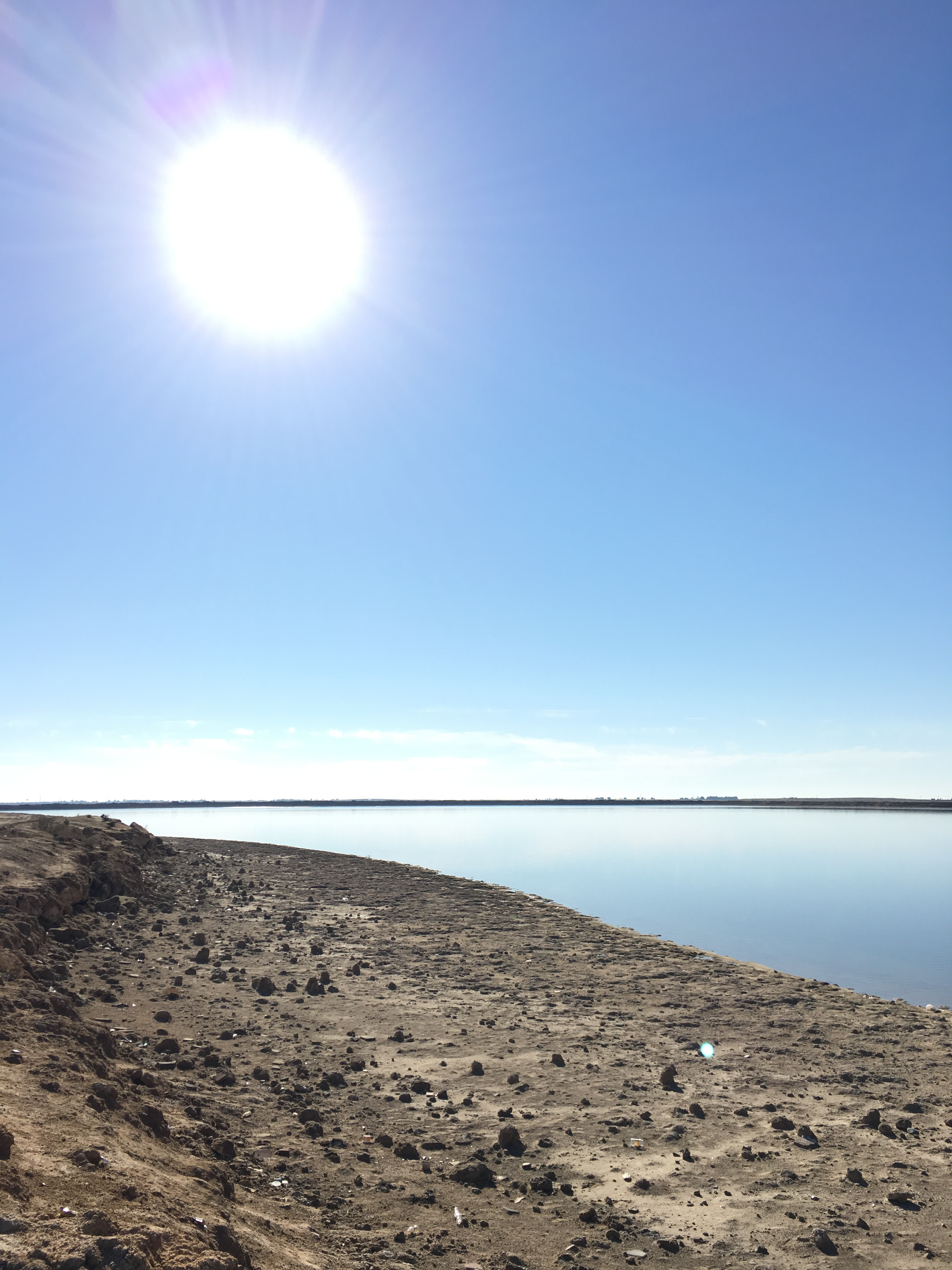
  Sawa Lake
- 30 March – Iraqi parliament fails to elect a president for the 3rd time since the October 2021 elections.

=== April ===
- 17 ِApril –Images of Sawa Lake in southern Iraq drying up spread on Iraqi social media, causing outrage and concern over the effects of climate change ad lack of any government plans to counter it.
- 18 April – Turkiye launches a new offensive against PKK fighters in northern Iraq.

=== May ===
- 1 May
  - Six missiles hit an oil refinery in Erbil, causing a fire.
  - An estimated 3,000 displaced due to clashes between YBS and the Iraqi Army with support from the Turkish Army and the KDP.
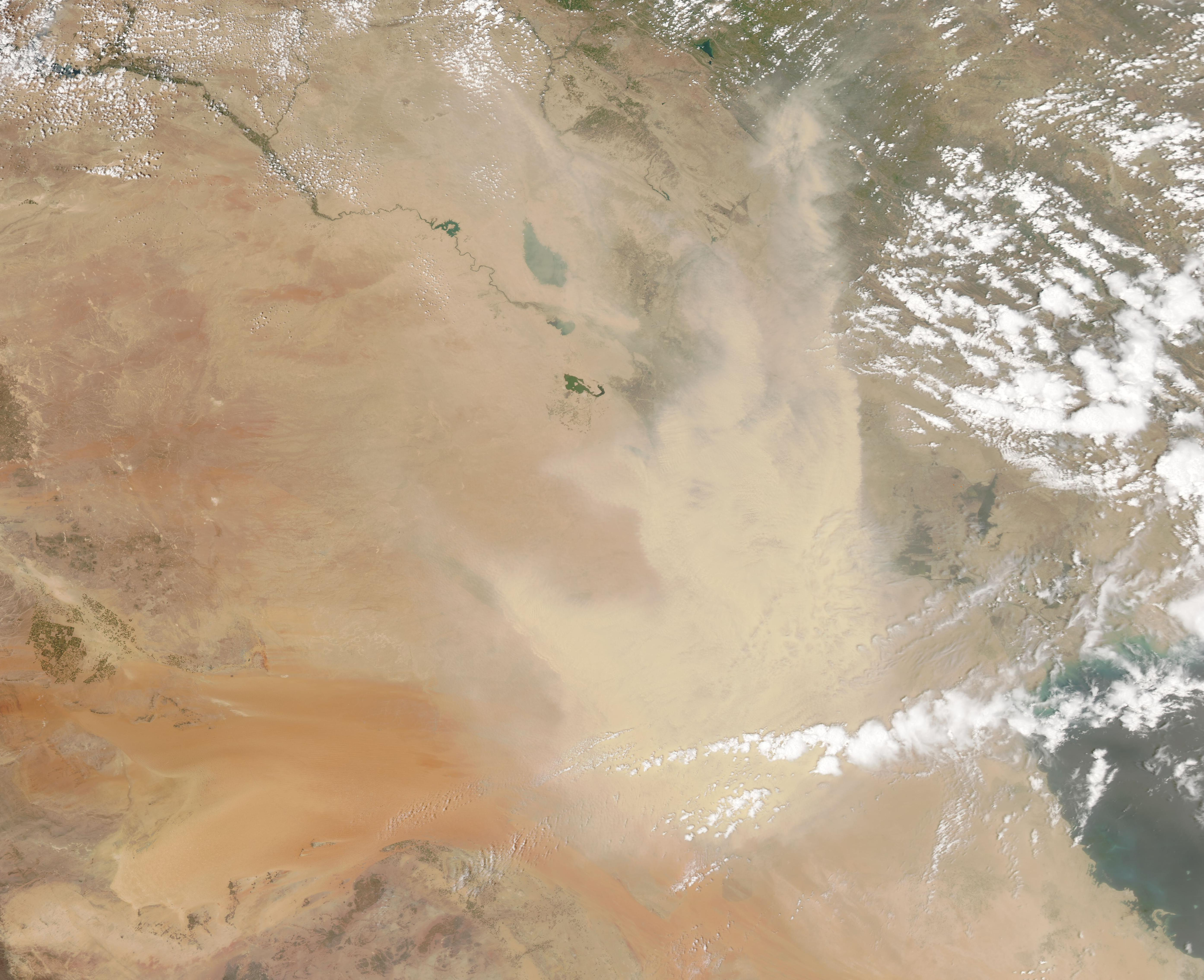
- Sandstorm over Iraq and Saudi Arabia in May
  5 May – Sandstorm sweeps across Iraq, causing one death and thousands hospitalized for respiratory symptoms.
- 16 May – Another Sandstorm, the eighth since April, hits several Iraqi cities, causing the closure of schools and Iraqi airspace.
- 22 May – Iraq reports an outbreak of Crimean-Congo Hemorrhagic Fever, with 212 cases and 27 deaths since January 2022.
- 26 May – Iraqi parliament passes a law criminalizing any attempts at normalization with Israel, which Iraq has never recognized.
- 31 May – An international team of archaeologists researching in northern Iraq announces the finding of a 'lost' city from the Mitanni Empire, estimated at 3,400 years old. The city was reveled due to severe draught of the Tigris river.

=== June ===
- 12 June – Iraqi political crisis intensifies as 73 MPs from the Muqtada al-Sadr’s bloc resign from parliament.
- 23 June – The Parliament swears in new members to replace the one who resigned earlier in the month. The new members tipped the numbers in favor of the Coordination Framework coalition, led by Nouri al-Maliki, giving it the majority.

=== July ===
- 14–17 July – A series of recordings, attributed to Nouri al-Maliki, are leaked. The recordings spark controversy because they contain attacks on other politicians as well as alluding to potential breakout of violence in the country.
- 20 July – Zakho resort attack, nine killed, thirty-three injured in shelling on the Barakh resort by either the KDP or the Turkish Armed Forces perpetrated the attacks.
- 26 July – At an emergency UN security council meeting, Iraqi foreign minister demands Turkish forces withdraw from all Iraqi territories.
- 27 July – Four mortar shells hit the surroundings of the Turkish consulate in Mosul, with no reported casualties.
- 27–31 July – Protesters affiliated with the Sadrist movement storm the parliament building in Baghdad and occupy it for few days.

=== August ===
- 1 August – Thousands of counter protesters gather around the green zone in Baghdad, protesting against he Sadrist protesters who have been occupying the parliament building.
- 4 August – A heatwave hits several Iraqi cities causing them to be listed among the hottest places in the world. State employees were given the day off as temperature reached 50C(or 122F), with Basra giving 4 days off to all employees.
- 20 August – Eight dead and several injured after a landslide caused the collapse of a Shia shrine in Karbala.
- 29–30 August – Muqtada Al-Sadr announces his retirement from politics. After the announcement clashes breakout between his supporters who stormed the government palace and security forces. The clashes, which lasted two days, resulted in 30 dead and about 700 injured. The protesters withdrew from the green zone on the afternoon of the second day after Al-Sader called for a "peaceful revolution".

=== September ===
- 1 September – Clashes between Al-Sader followers and another Shia militia, Asaib Ahl al-Haq, leaves 4 dead in Basra.
- 2 September – Thousands of protesters gather in Baghdad to demand change and end to corruption, after fears the latest series of clashes can lead to more destabilization.
- 29 September – Iranian missile and drone attack claiming to target Iranian Kurdish dissidents in Kurdistan leaves 14 dead including 1 American citizen.

=== October ===
- 3 October – The building for the national medical laboratory in Baghdad collapses leaving 4 dead while 13 others rescued from the rubble.
- 7 October – One person killed and 4 injured in a rigged car explosion.
- 12 October – Iraqi authorities opens an investigation in the operation that later became known as "heist of the century", in which about 2.5 Million dollars were stolen from the tax office between October 2021 and August 2022.
- 13 October –
  - At least 10 people injured in a Katyusha rocket attack on the green zone, targeting the parliament session meant to select a new president.
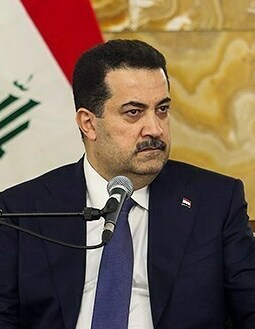
  - Al Sudani becomes Iraqi Prime Minister on October 27.
    After almost a year of deadlock, Iraqi parliament selects Abdul Latif Rashid as the new president of Iraq. The president in turn nominated Mohammed Shia' Al Sudani for the prime minister office.
- 19 October – Archologists in Iraq announce the discovery of unique ancient carvings during the restoration of Nineveh Mashki Gate.
- 24 October – The prime suspect in the "heist of the century", Nour Zuhair, is arrested at Bagdad's international airport while attempting to flee the country.
- 27 October – Parliament approves the prime minister designate Al Sudani and his cabinet.

=== November ===
- 1–11 November – Baghdad International fair is held for the first time in 3 years with 363 foreign and local companies attending.
- 3 November –The AL-Chadirji building, which is 3 story shopping center that houses many commercial outlets in Baghdad, is closed down after photos of cracks in its walls spread over social media. The concern over building's integrity, prompted by the incident of the National medical laboratory in October, lead the government to conduct a survey and decide the building is in danger of collapse.
- 17 November – Sulaymaniyah gas tank explosion, fifteen killed and a dozen more injured in explosions of a residential area.

=== December ===
- 18 December – Kirkuk bombing, nine security forces killed when an IED attacks their convoy followed by a firefight with IS, killing one.
- 20 December – Iraq attends the second Baghdad Conference for Cooperation held in Jordan to discuss the security of Iraq and the region. The summit was attended by representatives of several countries such as Saudi Arabia, France, Turkey, and Egypt.
- 23 December – Italian prime minister Giorgia Meloni visits Italian tropes stationed in Iraq as well as meeting Iraqi officials on her first bilateral trip outside Europe.

== Deaths ==
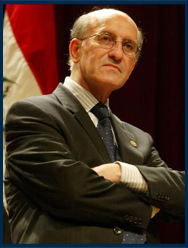
Sinan Al Shabibi

- 8 January – Sinan Al Shabibi, economist.(b.1941)
- 3 February – Abu Ibrahim al-Hashimi al-Qurashi, militant and IS leader.(b.1976)
- 11 February – Addai II Giwargis, Catholicos-Patriarch.
- 11 April – Hasab al-Shaikh Ja'far, poet.(b.1942)
- 14 March – Sharif Ali bin al-Hussein, politician and descendent of the Iraqi royal family. (b.1956)
- 30 March – Abdelilah Mohammed Hassan, football coach. (b.1934)
- 28 April – Abdulameer al-Hamdani, Iraqi politician and archologist.(b.1967)
- 22 May – Muthaffar al-Nawab, poet.(b.1934)
- 24 May – Hamid Yusif Hummadi, politician.(b.1935)
- 5 June – Haidar Abdul-Razzaq, footballer.(b.1982)
- 14 June – Abd al-Karim Barjas, politician.
- 30 August – Wafiq al-Samarrai, military general.(b.1947)
- 1 September – Sami Mahdi, writer and poet. (b.1940)
- 5 December – Salim al-Dabbagh, painter.(b.1941)
- 19 December – Salam al-Zaubai, politician.

== Weather ==
- 2022 Iraq dust storms

== See also ==
=== Country overviews ===
- Federal government of Iraq
- History of Iraq
- History of Iraq (2011–present)
- Iraq
- List of years in Iraq
- Outline of Iraq
- Politics of Iraq
- Timelines of Iraq history
