= Timeline of the Syrian civil war (2022) =

The following is a timeline of the Syrian civil war for 2022. Information about aggregated casualty counts is found in Casualties of the Syrian civil war.

== January ==
On 1 January, the Syrian Observatory for Human Rights (SOHR), a monitor based in the United Kingdom, reported that its activists had documented several Russian and government airstrikes in Northwest Syria. They said three civilians were killed in a Russian airstrike on a building north of Jisr al-Shughur, west of Idlib in Northwestern Syria, in an area controlled by rebels, as part of the on-going Russian involvement in the Syrian civil war, and that the Al-Fath Al-Mubin rebel faction counterattacked with rocket fire on government positions in Jorin area of Hama countryside and around Maarat al-Numan in the southern Idlib countryside.

On the same day in territories controlled by the government and the Kurdish-led Syrian Democratic Forces (SDF) in Northeastern Syria, according to SOHR, at least 10 Russian airstrikes targeted positions of Islamic State (ISIL) cells in the Al-Rusafa desert, north-east of Raqqa. A Syrian government military convoy comprising at least 100 soldiers of the Liwa al-Quds militia and the Syrian Army's 5th Corps, reportedly under orders from Russia and accompanied by Russian helicopters, arrived in Palmyra from Deir ez-Zor with tanks and armored vehicles to combat ISIS cells in the Palmyra desert. SOHR said these operations were part of a new Russian large-scale military campaign to respond to increased ISIL activity.

On 2 January, as part of this increased ISIL activity in Northeast Syria, five Syrian government soldiers were killed and 20 others were injured after ISIL operatives launched a rocket and artillery attack on a government military vehicle in the eastern part of the Syrian Desert.

Also on 2 January, according to SOHR, Turkish forces shelled Fatima village in the Ain Issa countryside in the Tell Abyad District of Raqqa Governorate, an area controlled by the Kurdish-led Autonomous Administration of North and East Syria (AANES), injuring an SDF fighter who died three days later.

On 4 January, according to SOHR, a commander of Ahrar al-Sham and his nephew were killed on a bridge near Jindires in the Afrin District of the Aleppo Governorate in Northwestern Syria, in territory controlled by the Turkey-backed Syrian National Army (SNA), by other Ahrar al-Sham members after their car was stopped at a checkpoint, which led to a gunfight between the militants.

On 5 January, as part of an uptick in the on-going 2019-2022 Persian Gulf crisis, the U.S "Green Village" military base, near the town of Mayadin in the Deir ez-Zor Governorate was attacked by Iranian-backed militias, who fired eight rockets at the military base (which houses SDF and Coalition fighters), causing minor damage. Several suspected launch sites were destroyed by U.S forces shortly after the attack. The attack came shortly after the 2nd anniversary of the U.S assassination of an Iranian General in 2020.

The same day, continuing on-going Israeli airstrikes on Iranian and government targets in Southern Syria, Israeli tanks fired at Syrian army positions in the town of Quneitra near the Golan Heights, in the Daraa Governorate, setting fire to a building.

On the same day, as part of the upsurge since 2019 of the on-going Daraa insurgency in Southern Syria, a Syrian soldier of the 4th Division, a member of a "reconciled" rebel militia (i.e. an opposition fighting group absorbed into the government forces) accused of drug trafficking, was shot dead by gunmen in the village of Saham al-Jawlan in the western Daraa countryside, according to SOHR.

On 6 January, in the continuing Russian-ISIL conflict in Northeastern Syria, SOHR reported that three Syrian soldiers were killed and 2 others were wounded in an ISIS ambush in the Al-Rusafa desert northeast of Raqqa city. In response, the Russian airforce launched several airstrikes on ISIS positions, causing an unknown number of casualties.

On 8 January, three Turkish soldiers were killed after an IED was detonated under their vehicle on the Syrian-Turkish border near the town of Tell Abyad in Raqqa Governorate. Turkish officials announced the IED was "planted by terrorists", likely referring to Kurdish People's Defense Units (YPG) forces.

On 10 January, as the Daraa insurgency intensified, SOHR reported that two soldiers of the Syrian Army's Military Security were shot dead by gunmen in the outskirts of Al-Sanamayn city, in Daraa Governorate in southern Syria. On the same day in the Northeast, ISIL claimed to have abducted and then executed a "spy" who was working with SDF forces in the town of Hajin.

On 11 January, two civilians were executed by Islamist rebels Hayat Tahrir al-Sham (HTS) in the town of Kafrsajna in Maarrat al-Nu'man District, Idlib, in a part of Northwestern Syria controlled by the HTS-dominated Syrian Salvation Government, after reportedly confessing to collaborating with Syrian government forces. On the same day in Northeastern Syria, ISIL operatives assassinated a doctor in the town of al-Tayyana for allegedly working with Kurdish forces.

On 12 January, ISIL militants, under cover of foggy weather, launched a minor offensive on Syrian army positions in the town of Al-Kashma, Deir ez-Zor Governorate, killing three Syrian soldiers and wounding seven others.

On 13 January, Anwar Raslan, a government intelligence officer, was found guilty by a German court after a 108 day trial to have overseen the murder of at least 27 people, torture of at least 4,000, two cases of rape and various other crimes at the Branch 251 prison in Damascus. He was tried under the legal principle of universal jurisdiction and sentenced to life imprisonment.

Also on 13 January, SOHR reported that ISIL operatives attacked positions of pro-government militias in the desert near the city of Abu Kamal, Deir ez-Zor Governorate, killing five National Defence Forces (NDF) militiamen and wounding 14 others. Eleven ISIL militants were reportedly also killed in government and Russian airstrikes on ISIL positions in the Syrian desert.

On the same day, an SNA fighter was killed in a car bomb explosion in the SNA-controlled city of Azaz in Aleppo, northwestern Syria. A suicide bombing also took place in the city of Afrin near a opposition military base, wounding several people. Three Syrian government soldiers were killed by opposition forces during an infiltration attempt on the rebel-held village of Sfuhen, Idlib, according to SOHR.

On 16 January, according to SOHR, 20 ex-ISIL families, totalling 217 people, were repatriated out of the Al-Hawl camp to several villages in the Deir ez-Zor Governorate in Northeastern Syria.

On the same day, according to SOHR, a military commander of the Syrian 4th Armoured Division was killed in an IED blast in Daraa city, as part of the on-going insurrection.

On 17 January, the SOHR reported that forces of the SDF and US-led Coalition raided an ISIL hideout in the Hawy Al-Hawayej area in the eastern Deir ez-zor countryside, killing an ISIL commander and confiscating weapons.

On 18 January in Northeastern Syria, Russian jets launched a series of airstrikes on ISIL positions in the eastern Homs desert, Maadan desert in the Raqqah countryside, and Deir Ezzor desert, killing several ISIL fighters and destroying several vehicles, according to SOHR. On 19 January, SOHR reported that eight ISIL operatives were killed in a series of Russian airstrikes on IS-held caves and hideouts in the Deir Ez-zor and Al-Raqqa deserts.

On 19 January, the trial of Alaa Mousa began in Germany. He is a Syrian medical doctor accused of torturing detainees for the government in Syria.

On 20 January, SOHR reported a civilian killed after SDF forces launched a rocket attack on the SNA-held village of Maryamayn, in the Afrin countryside. Rockets were also fired from Kurdish-held territories targeting the SNA-held city of Afrin, reportedly killing three civilians and wounding 15 others. A Turkish drone targeted SDF forces in AANES-controlled Tell Jemaah killing an SDF fighter and wounding 2 others.

Later that day, as part of ISIL resurgence on the Syria/Iraq border, the 3rd Battle of al-Hasakah began, after ISIS forces launched a large-scale attack aimed at freeing incarcerated ISIL fighters from a Gweiran prison, also known as al-Sinaa prison, in the city of Al-Hasakah. The siege lasted six days. Australian teenager Yusuf Zahab was among those killed.

On 21 January, SOHR reported that two fighters of the Tell Tamer Military Council (which is allied to AANES and the SDF) were killed after a Turkish drone strike on their positions on a road near Twina village north of Al-Hasakah city.

On 22 January, two fighters of the SNA were killed in an infiltration attempt on the SDF-controlled Al-Mushayrifah and Jahbal villages near the town of Ayn Issa. On the same day, SOHR reported, Russian or Syrian warplanes killed 73 civilians in a series of airstrikes on the settlements of Khisham, Tabiyah, Jazirah and Al-Bulil, in opposition-controlled parts of Deir Ezzor.

On 24 January, according to SOHR, two Iranian-backed militiamen were killed in a landmine explosion near the town of Nebl in the northern Aleppo countryside.

On 26 January, the SOHR reported that a commander of HTS was blown up and killed whilst attempting to plant a landmine on the frontlines near the town of Darat Izza. On the same day, IS claimed responsibility for abducting and beheading an SDF fighter south of Raqqa city.

On 27 January, forces of the Jordanian army uncovered a drug-smuggling operation from Syria to Jordan, started after a Jordanian army officer was killed by drug smugglers from Syria earlier in January. Clashes broke out between the drug smugglers and the Jordanian army after the operation was thwarted. 27 drug smugglers were killed by the Jordanian army.

On 28 January, SOHR reported that two fighters of the pro-Assad Al-Qatarji militia were found dead along the bank of the Euphrates River after being killed by unknown gunmen in al-Bolil village, where they were stationed.

On 29 January, unknown gunmen, suspected to by ISIL operatives, killed four Syrian government soldiers as they slept at their outpost in the settlement of Bakras Tahtani in the Deir ez-Zor countryside. This was after a similar attack was carried out in neighbouring Iraq.

On 30 January, as tensions were growing between SNA factions in Northwestern Syria, SOHR reported that a commander of the Turkish-backed Al-Hamza Division was shot dead by unknown gunmen in the city of Al-Bab.

During the early hours of 31 January, Israeli warplanes carried out several airstrikes against alleged Hezbollah targets near the Syrian capital, Damascus, causing material damage only.

On 31 January, the SDF said that the Gweiran prison overrun by ISIL was now fully back under its control.

== February ==
On 1 February, three fighters of the Liwa al-Quds militia were killed and two others were wounded after ISIL militants attacked their positions in the al-Masrib desert in the western Deir ez-Zor countryside. The wounded fighters were taken to a Syrian military hospital in Deir ez-Zor city for treatment. On the same day, a reconciled rebel was shot dead by unknown gunmen in the town of Muzayrib, Daraa.

On 2 February, SOHR reported that a Turkish drone bombed a power station in the city of Al-Malikiyah killing 4 people. On the same day, 8 civilians were killed and 29 others were wounded after several rockets were fired targeting the Turkish-held city of al-Bab. Later in the day, a Turkish soldier was killed after SDF forces fired artillery at Turkish army positions on the Syrian-Turkish border. Furthermore, 3 Syrian soldiers were killed after Turkish forces bombarded several Syrian army positions on the western Aleppo frontline.

On 3 February, United States President Joe Biden announced that U.S. military forces successfully undertook a counterterrorism operation in Atme, northwest Syria, resulting in the death of Islamic State leader Abu Ibrahim al-Hashimi al-Qurashi. A senior White House official stated to Reuters that al-Qurashi had exploded a bomb which killed himself and 12 more people, including members of his family, during the Joint Special Operations Command operation. According to the US, their forces came under fire from Hayat Tahrir al-Sham fighters and returned fire killing two, although this account was contested by analysts and local activists who said that only one was killed.

On the same day, three fighters of the Kurdish Women's Protection Units (YPJ) militia were killed after a Turkish drone bombed their positions in the village of Kharza, near Al-Darbasiyah. Furthermore, 3 commanders of the Liwa al-Shamal brigade were killed in an IED explosion in Beir Maghar village near Jarablus city.

On 5 February, SOHR reported that an SDF fighter was killed and another was wounded after an IED exploded targeting an SDF military base in the Jarn Aswad village west of Tell Abyad.

On 7 February, a draft agreement between Russia and Belarus revealed that 200 Belarusian troops were to be deployed to Syria alongside Russian troops, under Russian operational command. The document, which was endorsed by Russian Prime Minister Mikhail Mishustin, said the Belarusian troops were to supplement Russian soldiers in providing "humanitarian assistance" to populations outside combat zones. Also on 7 February, SOHR reported that two Syrian government soldiers were killed by fighters of Al-Fatah al-Mubin during a sniping operation conducted on the Idlib frontlines.

In the early morning of February 9, Israeli warplanes launched airstrikes, targeting radar and anti-aircraft batteries near Damascus. The attack killed a Syrian army lieutenant and wounded 5 others.

Later in the day, SOHR reported that Syrian forces destroyed a SNA technical with a rocket at the Abu Al-Zandin crossing, east of al-Bab city, killing one SNA fighter.

Also on February 9, ISIL fighters attacked an SDF military post Al-Shuhail desert, east of Deir Ezzor, killing 5 fighters of the Deir ez-Zor Military Council. IS militants also infiltrated an SDF military post in Jazra Al-Bushms under the cover of a dust storm, killing 4 SDF fighters with silenced weapons. One IS fighter was also killed in the attack. This kind of sneak attack is the 3rd such attack committed by IS in Iraq and Syria since early January.

On 10 February, dozens of people in the mainly Druze city of As-Suwayda in southern Syria took to the streets protesting against corruption and worsening living standard under slogans including "We want to live with dignity" and "There is nothing left for the poor", with some protestors carrying the Druze community flag, following a week of sporadic demonstrations in the surrounding countryside. On Friday 11 February, the protests had grown to the hundreds, with hundreds of government security forces entering the city in response.

Also on 10 February, ISIL operatives ambushed a Syrian military convoy in the eastern Homs desert, killing three Syrian soldiers including a major general. In response to the attack, Russian warplanes launched several airstrikes targeting positions and hideouts of ISIL cells in the Syrian desert, reportedly killing nine ISIL fighters. SOHR reported that the airstrikes continued the following day, with a total of seven ISIL fighters were killed after Russian warplanes launched three airstrike attacks on their hideouts in the Syrian desert.

On 12 February, six civilians were killed after Syrian government artillery targeted the rebel-held village of Maaret Elnaasan, in the Idlib countryside.

On 13 February, SOHR reported that two fighters of the SDF was killed and one was wounded after Turkish forces launched a rocket attack on the village of Maaliq, near the town Ain Issa. On the same day, the SOHR reported that as part of a crackdown on Al-Qaeda linked militants in the Idlib Governorate, HTS had arrested at least 250 militants of Hurras ad-Din, some of whom were reportedly of non-Syrian nationalities.

On 15 February, an IED explosion took place, targeting a Syrian military convoy in the Syrian capital of Damascus near Umayyad Square, killing one Syrian soldier and wounding 11 others. On the same day, at least three civilians were blown up and killed in a rocket attack on the city of Azaz. The same day, Russian news agency Interfax reported that, as part of a surge in Russian military activity due to the intensification of the 2021–2022 Russo-Ukrainian crisis, Russia deployed MiG-31K fighter jets with hypersonic Kinzhal missiles and long-range Tupolev Tu-22M strategic bombers to its Hmeimim air base on Syria'a Mediterranean coast.

On the same day, two Syrian soldiers were killed and 9 others were wounded after opposition factions shelled several villages in the Idlib governorate. A civilian was also injured in the shelling.

On 16 February, a Pro-Assad, Iranian-backed militiaman was killed by an ISIL-planted landmine in the Uqayribat desert in the eastern Hama countryside, as reported by the SOHR. On the same day, the town of Al-Dana, Idlib, was bombed by Syrian army artillery, killing 3 civilians.

Furthermore, following increasing Russian airstrikes on positions of IS, the SOHR confirmed that 6 IS fighters had been killed in Russian airstrikes in the desert areas of the Aleppo-Hama-Al-Raqqah triangle.

On 17 February, following Syrian army shelling on opposition-held town of Al-Dana the day prior, skirmishes broke out between opposition and Syrian government forces on the nearby Idlib frontline, near the town of Darat Izza, leaving one opposition fighter and one Syrian soldier dead. On the same day, a Car bomb exploded in the city of al-Bab, killing one civilian.

Furthermore, a Syrian Arab Air Force helicopter was forced to make an emergency landing due to technical failures. The helicopter crashed in a mountainous area of Latakia, killing two of the crew and injuring 4 others.

On 18 February, another car bomb explosion took place in the city of al-Bab, killing a commander of Suqour al-Sham, as reported by the SOHR. On the same day, it was also reported that an execution of an Imam took place in Darkush, Idlib, by HTS for allegedly working with the Syrian government.

On 19 February, as part of the ongoing Daraa insurgency, the SOHR documented the deaths of 2 Syrian soldiers after being shot dead by unknown gunmen near the roundabout in the city of Al-Shaykh Maskin. On the same day, a fighter of Liwa al-Shamal was shot dead by unknown gunmen in the village of Tokhar, Aleppo. Also, the village of Hezwan, near al-Bab, was shelled by Syrian forces, causing material damage.

On 20 February, the SOHR documented an ISIL attack on a Syrian army post in the Deir ez-Zor desert that resulted in the deaths of 2 Syrian soldiers. On the same day, 3 Syrian soldiers were killed after a landmine, planted by suspected ISIL operatives, exploded underneath their vehicle in the village of Jabal al-Omar.

The SOHR also reported that a Syrian soldier was killed by opposition factions on the Miznaz frontline, in the western Aleppo countryside.

On 21 February, the SOHR documented that 5 militiamen of the Pro-Assad Baqir Brigade were killed after their bus drove over a landmine planted by suspected IS operatives in the Itheriya desert near the city of Raqqa.

On 22 February, one person was killed after a car bomb exploded in the opposition-held city of Azaz, northern Syria. On the same day, it was documented by the SOHR that a fighter of the Al-Mubin operations room was killed on the Kurd Mountains frontline by Syrian army shelling.

Furthermore, 3 people were killed in a hospital fire in the city of Aleppo.

On 23 February, Israeli forces launched missiles targeting Syrian positions in Quneitra, causing material damage only. On the same day, a former commander of ISIS, by the name of Kamal Hamid al-Jaouni, was shot dead by unknown gunmen near the town of Al-Shajara.

Two people were also killed in an explosion in the al-Hosyniyah area of Rif Dimashq.

On 24 February, 6 Syrian soldiers were killed after Israel launched airstrikes targeting Syrian army positions near Damascus.

On 25 February, three SDF fighters were killed by suspected IS operatives near Hajin.

On 27 February, the SOHR documented the deaths of 2 people and the injury of two others after Syrian artillery targeted the village of Afs, in Idlib.

== March ==
On 3 March, the first 30 Syrian Arab Army officers arrived in Russia to fight in its invasion of Ukraine.

The Islamic State (ISIL) insurgency continued in Northeastern Syria. On 3 March, a Syrian Democratic Forces (SDF) fighter was shot dead by ISIL operatives in the town of Abu Hamam, in the Deir ez-Zor Governorate, the SOHR reported. On 4 March, SOHR reported three government soldiers were killed after suspected IS gunmen opened fire on their military vehicle in the area of Sabkha Al-Malah district east of Palmyra. On the same day, the Jordanian army announced they had killed a suspected smuggler on the Syria-Jordan border.

On 6 March, 13 more government soldiers were killed and 18 others were wounded after a military bus was targeted by IS militants in the Syrian desert, near Palmyra.

On 7 March, two Syrian civilians were killed by an Israeli missile attack on a Syrian military position near Damascus according to the Syrian Ministry of Defense. Iran later announced that two IRGC colonels, Ehsan Karbalaipour and Morteza Saeednejad, had been killed in the attack and that "Undoubtedly, the Zionist regime will pay for this crime". The same day, the US alleged that Russia was attempting to recruit Syrians to fight for it in its invasion of Ukraine.

On 10 March, five government-allied Liwa al-Quds militiamen were killed and 7 others were injured in a landmine explosion in the Jabal al-Amour area in the Palmyra desert, according to SOHR. The same day, ISIL named its new leader, Abu Hassan al-Hashimi al-Qurayshi.

On 11 March, Vladimir Putin announced that Russia would accept volunteers from the Middle East, including Syria, to fight on behalf of Russia in Ukraine. Ukrainian president Volodymyr Zelenskyy called the Syrian volunteers "Murderers". It was also reported that some Syrian soldiers of the Syrian army's Tiger Forces were in the process of joining the Wagner Group to fight alongside Russia in the war. Russian military personnel in Syria had accepted over 22,000 candidacies from Syrian fighters as of March 15. Russian adverts on the Facebook page of the SAA's Fourth armoured division offered mercenaries $3,000 over six months, while the Syrian Observatory for Human Rights said that Syrian fighters would receive a salary of 1,000 Euros per month, and on 15 March echoed Syrian government claims that 40,000 Syrians had signed up to go to Ukraine, although the Carnegie Endowment for International Peace later reported that this figure was uncorroborated and unlikely.

On 15 March, two Syrian soldiers of the General Intelligence Directorate were killed and others were wounded in a skirmish with gunmen in the town of Jasim, in the Daraa countryside as the Daraa insurgency continued. Three other soldiers later died of their wounds. On 17 March, the head of the Jasim town council was shot dead by unknown gunmen just outside the town of Jasim, in the Daraa countryside.

The first 150 Syrian fighters arrived in Russia.

On 18 March, a reconciled rebel was shot dead by unknown gunmen in the town of Al-Karak, Daraa.

On 19 March, an SDF fighter was found dead in the village of Swidan Jazira, in the Deir ez-zour countryside, after being kidnapped by suspected IS militants the day before.

As part of the on-going normalisation of relations between Syria and other Arab states (see Foreign relations of Syria), Bashar al-Assad was hosted for a state visit by the United Arab Emirates, the first such visit since the start of the war, meeting Sheikh Mohamed bin Rashid al-Maktoum, vice-president and prime minister of the UAE and ruler of Dubai.

On 21 March, a fighter of the Al-Hamza Division was shot dead in the village of Aziziyah, near Ras al-Ayn, during an internal dispute over smuggling.

On 24 March, a fighter of Tahrir al-Sham (HTS) was killed and another was injured after Syrian army artillery targeted their positions in the town of Taqad in the western Aleppo countryside. On the same day, the mayor of Al-Sanamayn municipality was shot dead by unknown gunmen in the northern Daraa countryside.

On 26 March, a fighter of Al-Fatah al-Mubin was killed by a Syrian army sniper on the Kafr Ama frontline, in the western Aleppo countryside. On the same day, a fighter of the Syrian National Army was also shot dead by a Kurdish sniper in the village of Ablah, near Azaz. On 27 March, a Syrian soldier was shot and killed by opposition forces in the village of Dara al-Kabira on the southern Idlib frontline.

A 26 March report of an investigation by the Daily Telegraph and others stated that 3,000 Syrians had been cleared to fight in Ukraine, many recruited by the Al-Sayyad Company, a private military company funded by Moscow with links to the Wagner Group of mercenaries (which had opened its recruitment on 12 March), and that some were coerced into fighting.

On 28 March, SDF forces, backed up by Coalition helicopters, raided a house in the Al-Litwah neighbourhood in the town of Diban, killing a suspected ISIL militant who refused to surrender to SDF forces. The house was destroyed by SDF forces after the raid. On the same day, a fighter of the Levant Front was killed in an IED explosion in the village of Ranin, near Suluk.

On 29 March, two SDF fighters were found dead two days after being abducted by suspected ISIS militants from a military checkpoint at the Al-Safafnna water station, in the eastern Deir ez-Zor countryside. On the same day, a military doctor of the Syrian Army's 8th Brigade was blown up and killed in an IED explosion in the town of Mahajjah, Daraa. On the same day, 4 people including an ISIS fighter were killed after a small clash took place between suspected ISIS gunmen and SDF forces at the Al-Hawl refugee camp. The SOHR documented that throughout the month of March, at least nine ISIS militants had been killed in Russian airstrikes on IS-held positions in the Syrian desert.

On 30 March, two Syrian government soldiers were killed and another 2 were wounded after being shot by unknown gunmen on the Da'il-Daraa highway in the Daraa countryside.

== April ==
On 1 April, two fighters of Ahrar al-Sham and a fighter of the Levant Front were killed during internal clashes in the village of Awlan, near al-Bab. On the same day, a member of the Kurdish Self-Defense Forces was killed and 2 others were injured after a Turkish drone destroyed their vehicle near Al-Qahtaniyah.

On 2 April, a fighter of HTS was killed and 3 others were wounded after a skirmish broke out with Syrian Arab Army (SAA) forces on al-Fatera village frontline, in the southern Idlib countryside.

On 3 April, as part of the continuing ISIL insurgency, two Iranian-backed pro-government militiamen were killed and 8 others were injured after Islamic State fighters attacked the militiamen at a fuel station on the eastern outskirts of Al-Sukhnah, in the eastern part of the Homs Governorate.

On 4 April, as part of the Daraa insurgency, a soldier of the Syrian Army's 10th Division was shot dead and another was injured by unknown gunmen in the town of Abtaa, Daraa.

On 5 April, one SDF operative was killed and two others were wounded after suspected ISIS gunmen opened fire on SDF forces in the city of Hajin, but then escaped on a motorcycle. On the same day, a Syrian soldier was shot dead and another was injured by unknown gunmen in the city of Al-Quriyah, in the Deir ez-Zor Governorate.

On 6 April, in the early hours of the morning, seven fighters of the Levant Front, including a commander, were killed in an attack by unidentified gunmen on a military checkpoint on the road between Azaz and the Bab Al-Salama border crossing with Turkey. One of the unidentified gunmen was also killed in the clash. On the same day, a Pro-Assad militiaman was killed and 3 others were wounded after ISIL insurgents attacked a military outpost near the Al-Kharata oil field in the Syrian desert.

On 7 April, four US service members at the Green Village Coalition base in SDF territory near the Iraqi border were injured in an explosive attack. Investigations later revealed the attack may have been carried out by a US service member.

The same day, a Syrian government soldier was shot dead by unknown gunmen the Al-Jiza- Al-Kahil road, east of Daraa.

On 8 April, a member of the pro-government National Defence Forces (NDF) militia was killed in an internal dispute in the city of Deir ez-Zor.

On 8 April, the Association of Detainees and the Missing in Sednaya Prison (ADMSP) reported that more than $1.5bn in personal property, including cars, olive groves, shops, houses, electronics and jewellery, had been seized by the government from citizens accused of joining opposition protests in the previous decade.

On 9 April, two Syrian government soldiers, including a captain, were killed in the village of Dadikh on the Idlib frontline, after HTS forces launched a sniping operation in the area. On the same day, a fighter of the SDF was killed and two others were injured after a Turkish drone targeted an SDF checkpoint in Tel Kabz village near Al-Dirbasiyah on the Syria-Turkey border.

On 12 April, an ex-Asayish member was burnt alive in a car after being kidnapped by ISIS operatives in the town of al-Sabhah, east of Deir ez-Zor.

On 13 April, a soldier of the Syrian Army's Internal Security Division was shot dead by unknown gunmen in al-Masifra town in the Daraa countryside.

On 14 April, a fighter of the Sham Legion was killed and another was wounded after Kurdish forces fired a missile at a military vehicle on the Merimin frontline near Azaz.

Furthermore, 17 ISIS militants were killed in several Russian airstrikes targeting ISIS hideouts and positions in the Syrian desert.

On 15 April, during the early hours of the morning, Israeli jets carried out airstrikes on several buildings near Damascus, causing material damage only. On the same day, a militant of Ansar al-Islam blew himself up in a suicide attack aimed at destroying Syrian army positions near the village of Sirmaniyah, Hama. One Syrian soldier was killed and 4 others were wounded in the attack.

On 16 April, two SDF fighters were shot dead in the al-Jasym countryside, north of Deir ez-Zor, by ISIS gunmen who were riding a motorbike.

On 17 April, Islamic State spokesman, Abu Umar al-Mujahid, announced the beginning of the "Vengeance for two Sheikhs" campaign against enemy combatants in Syria.

ISIS insurgents ambushed a Syrian military vehicle near Al-Ghanem Al-Ola village east of Al-Raqqa, killing one Syrian soldier and injuring another. On the same day, Turkish forces shelled the village of Tell Shinan, near Tell Tamer, killing one SDF fighter.

On 18 April, the head of the Syrian Turkmen "Ahfad Al-Qarah Kaji" organisation, backed by the Government of Turkey, was killed in an IED explosion in the town of Qabasin. On the same day, a SNA fighter was killed after SDF forces shelled an area on the Euphrates river near Jarablus.

Furthermore, a fighter of the opposition Mu'tasim Division was killed in internal clashes in Afrin.

On 19 April, three Syrian soldiers were killed and three others were injured after a landmine, planted by ISIL militants, exploded near Jabal al-Bilas, in the Syrian desert. On the same day, a Syrian soldier was shot dead by insurgents in the town of Inkhil, Daraa.

On 20 April, two Syrian soldiers were killed after a remnant ISIS landmine exploded after their military vehicle drove over it in the Al-Masrab desert in the Raqqa countryside. On the same day, 3 SDF fighters were killed after a Turkish drone bombed a military vehicle of the SDF on the Aidiq-Takhtak road near Kobanî.

On 21 April, two SDF fighters were killed after ISIL militants attacked an SDF checkpoint near the village of Al-Sajr, north of Deir ez-Zor. On the same day, a Syrian Army lieutenant was killed by an opposition sniper on the al-kabinah frontline in the Latakia countryside.

On 22 April, six opposition fighters and two civilians were killed and ten others were injured in internal clashes in the city of Ras al-Ayn. On the same day, a Turkish soldier was killed after a Turkish military vehicle was shelled in the city of Mare', north of Aleppo.

Furthermore, two Syrian soldiers were killed and 6 others were injured after ISIS gunmen attacked a Syrian army post in the Bir Rahum area, in the Raqqa desert.

On 23 April, two Asayish fighters were shot dead by suspected ISIS militants in the village of al-Shahabat, Deir ez-Zor.

On 24 April, suspected ISIS militants attacked an SDF checkpoint in the village of Hariza, near Al-Busayrah, killing one SDF fighter and injuring another.

On 25 April, two Syrian army soldiers were killed and ten others were injured after ISIS militants attacked Syrian army and militia positions near the al-Kharatah oil field in the western Deir ez-Zor desert. The attack came after Russian warplanes targeted ISIS positions in the nearby deserts. On the same day, an ex-SDF officer was found dead after being shot by suspected ISIS militants in the Haraqat area near Deir ez-Zor.

Later on the same day, three Syrian soldiers were killed in clashes with ISIS fighters near Jebel Bishri in the Syrian desert. In response, Russian warplanes reportedly conducted at least 20 airstrikes against ISIS positions, causing an unknown number of casualties.

On 26 April, an SNA fighter was killed after being shot by a Kurdish sniper in the village of al-Tuways, north of Aleppo.

On 27 April, in the early hours of the morning, Israeli warplanes carried out airstrikes against an ammunition depot near Damascus, killing 9 people, including 5 Syrian soldiers.

Later the same day, 7 people were shot dead and 4 others were injured after ISIS militants conducted a massacre in the house of the chief of the relations office of Deir ez-Zor Civil Council in the town of Abu Khashab.

On 30 April, four militiamen of Kata'ib Sayyid al-Shuhada were killed and six others were injured after ISIS militants ambushed their patrol near Ark village, on the highway between Palmyra and Deir ez-Zor in the Syrian desert. Furthermore, an SDF fighter of the Deir ez-Zor Military Council was shot dead by ISIS gunmen who attacked an SDF checkpoint on a motorcycle near Al-Tikihi village, east of Deir ez-Zor. On the Aleppo frontline, near the village of Kaimar, three fighters of the Al-Hamza Division were killed in an infiltration attempt by Kurdish "Tahrir Afrin" fighters.

On the same day, unidentified gunmen shot dead a Syrian soldier in the city of Al-Hirak, Daraa.

== May ==
On 1 May, a civilian was shot dead by Levant Front militants in the village of Arab Wiran, near Afrin. On the same day, the head of the Turkish-backed "Rawdat Al-Rayyana" organisation and former fighter of Ahrar al-Sham was killed in an IED explosion in the city of Jarablus.

On 2 May, as part of the ongoing Daraa insurgency, a Syrian soldier died of his wounds after he was shot by unidentified gunmen earlier that day on a highroad near Jasim, Daraa. On the same day, a civilian was shot dead by opposition Suqour al-Sham militants in Qazal Basha village in the countryside near Afrin.

On 3 May, a SDF fighter was shot dead in the town of Diban by ISIS gunmen.

On 4 May, a fighter of Ahrar al-Sharqiya was killed in an internal clash in the village of Al-Raqiya, west of Ras al-Ayn. On the same day, Turkish soldier was killed in the village of Kimar after Kurdish forces shelled a Turkish military vehicle in the area.

On 5 May, a soldier of the Syrian Army's Military Intelligence Directorate was shot dead by gunmen in his house in Saida, Daraa. A soldier of the Syrian Army's 15th Division was shot dead on the Nahj-Kharab al shahm road west of Daraa.

On 6 May, ISIS militants attacked a Syrian Military post in the Syrian desert, close to the border with Jordan and Iraq. Eight people were killed in the attack.

On 7 May, two Syrian soldiers were killed after Turkish and Turkish-backed fighters shelled the villages of Ziyarah and Deir Jmal, in the Aleppo Governorate. On the same day, a man associated with the Syrian Army's Intelligence Directorate was shot dead by unidentified gunmen in the village of Al-Zaafaraniyah, Homs.

Furthermore, seven people, including a child, were killed in internal clashes between Pro-Assad Iranian-backed militiamen in Sayyidah Zaynab, Rif Dimashq Governorate.

On 8 May, six fighters of the National Front for Liberation were killed after Syrian Army forces fired a guided missile at opposition positions in Cairo village on the Al-Ghab frontline.

On 9 May, a fighter of the Levant Front was killed after clashes broke out between rebel and Kurdish forces on the frontline at the village of Inab, Aleppo. On the same day, three Syrian soldiers were killed by a remnant landmine, planted by ISIS, near Hamimah village in the Syrian desert.

Furthermore, it was reported that ISIS militants in cars and on motorbikes were openly patrolling desert areas and roads near Wady Al-Abyad north of Palmyra.

On May 11, a civilian was killed after his car was targeted by a Turkish drone strike on a road near Kobanî. On the same day a Levant Front fighter was killed on the frontlines at the city of Mare', after clashes broke out between opposition and Kurdish forces.

Furthermore, an SDF fighter was killed by tribal forces after an SDF patrol attempted to confiscate motorcycles from the tribesmen.

Also, a Syrian soldier of the 4th Armoured Division was shot dead by insurgents in the village of Al-Yadudah, Daraa.

On May 12, three Syrian soldiers were killed and two others were wounded by a remnant ISIS landmine near Salamiyah town in the Syrian desert.

On May 13, at least 10 Pro-Assad Shia militiamen were killed after opposition forces fired a guided missile at a Syrian military bus on the Qabtan Al-Jabal frontlines in the western Aleppo countryside. Opposition forces later shelled the town of Nubl, Aleppo, killing a child and injuring another. Also, a fighter of the Turkish-backed Glory Corps was found shot dead in the village of Mamily in the Afrin countryside.

In the evening, Israeli warplanes conducted airstrikes on a Syrian military site in the city of Masyaf, Hama Governorate. Six Syrian soldiers and a civilian were killed in the attack and several others were injured.

On 14 May, two SDF fighters were killed in clashes with suspected ISIS fighters after SDF forces conducting raiding operations in the villages of Tawamiya, Harizah and Barshim in Deir Ezzor countryside, in search of weapons and wanted individuals. On the same day a Syrian army officer was shot dead by ISIS cells in an attack on a Syrian army checkpoint at the al-Shahmy junction in the eastern Homs desert. ISIS cells also assassinated a Kurdish administrative official in the village of al-Hariji, north of Deir ez-Zor.

Furthermore, a fighter of Ahrar al-Sharqiya was shot dead by suspected ISIS militants in the town of Ras al-Ayn.

On 15 May, two SNA fighters were killed after SDF forces fired a heat-seeker missile at their military vehicle in the northern al-Hasakah countryside. On the same day, a Syrian soldier was killed after forces of Al-Fatah al-Mubin shelled Syrian army positions in the town of Kafr Nabl, Idlib.

Furthermore, two associates of the Syrian army's military security were shot dead by gunmen in the town of Tafas, Daraa.

On 16 May, two militiamen of the Ba'ath militia were killed in a double IED explosion in the village of Deir Khabiyah, Rif Dimashq.

On 17 May, two Syrian soldiers were shot dead by unknown gunmen near Saida, Daraa.

On 18 May, two Syrian soldiers were killed and several others were injured after ISIS militants ambushed them near the Wadi Al-Zakara area of the Syrian desert.

On 20 May, three separate assassinations were conducted by insurgents in Daraa Governorate, leaving a civilian, an ex-Syrian army soldier and an associate of the Syrian military security branch dead. On the same day, a Jihadist suicide bomber blew himself up after infiltrating a Syrian army position on the Jabal al-Akrad frontline, killing two Syrian soldiers.

In the evening, Israel launched a missile attack on a Syrian military position near Damascus International Airport, killing three Syrian soldiers.

On May 21, an insurgent was shot dead in a firefight with Syrian military forces in Daraa, after he was caught trying to plant an IED near a Syrian Government compound. Furthermore, a soldier of the Syrian Army's 4th Division was also shot dead by gunmen near the city of Jasim, Daraa.

On the same day, the Jordanian Army killed four drug-smugglers on the border with Syria's As-Suwayda Governorate.

On 23 May, Turkish president Recep Tayyip Erdoğan, announced that Turkish military forces were aiming to resume the creation of a 30km safe-zone on Turkey's southern border with Syria.

On 24 May, ISIS militants executed a civilian from the town of Al-Zer, Dier ez-Zor, allegedly for "carrying out robberies". On the same day, two civilians were shot dead by insurgents near the city of Jasim, Daraa.

On 25 May, three tribal members of the Syrian National Army were killed in internal tribal clashes in the town of Ras al-Ayn. On the same day, two soldiers of the Syrian Army's 5th Division were shot dead by insurgents in Kiheel, Daraa.

On 27 May, a Syrian army officer was killed and one of his escorts was injured after an IED exploded targeting their vehicle near Al-Shaykh Saad, Daraa.

On 28 May, two civilians were shot and killed by unidentified gunmen near Al-Masifra, Daraa.

On 29 May, two commanders of the Mu'tasim Division were killed after an IED exploded targeting their military vehicle south of Ras al-Ayn.

On the same day, following Turkish threats to launch a new military operation in Syria, Syrian National Army Captain, Abdul Salam Abdul Razak, announced that SNA officers had been ordered to "take an offensive stance" and that "There are thousands of fighters ready to participate alongside the Turkish military."

On 30 May, three reconciled rebels were shot dead in an ambush by insurgents on a road near Jasim, Daraa. On the same day, two people were killed and three others were injured in a Turkish drone strike in the Sikirka area, east of Qamishli city.

Furthermore, it was reported that in the month of May, at least eight ISIS fighters had been killed and thirteen others had been injured in Russian airstrikes in the Syrian desert.

== June ==
On 1 June, at least three civilians were killed after Kurdish forces allegedly launched a rocket attack on the Turkish-held town of Tell Abyad.The SDF afterwards issued a statement denying its fighters had fired any rockets.

On 2 June, a fighter of the Manbij Military Council was killed repelling an infiltration attempt by SNA forces near the village of Mahsanli, east of Aleppo. On the same day, a fighter of Ahrar al-Sham was killed by SAA rocket fire on the Jabal al-Akrad frontline.

Furthermore, at least four people were killed and at least twenty others were injured after Islamic State militants attacked a bus travelling in the Al-Shawla desert, south of Deir ez-Zor.

On 3 June, two SDF fighters and a smuggler were killed after SDF forces launched an anti-smuggling operation in Abu Hamam, Deir ez-Zor. On the same day, two militants of Jaysh Usud al-Sharqiya were killed by protestors in the town of Jindires, northern Syria.

On June 5, 2022, the leader of the Syrian Democratic Forces (SDF), Mazloum Abdi, said that Kurdish forces were willing to work with Syrian government forces to defend against Turkey, saying “Damascus should use its air defense systems against Turkish planes." Abdi said that Kurdish groups would be able to cooperate with the Syrian government, and still retain their autonomy.

On 7 June, two civilians were shot dead by unidentified gunmen in the town of Tafas, Daraa.

On 8 June, a Syrian Army officer was blown up and killed by a remnant landmine near Al-Taim oil field in the Deir ez-Zor countryside.

Later the same day, the Syrian National Army assigned recently formed military councils of the cities of Tel Rifaat and Manbij, to "liberate them from Kurdish separatists". This comes after the Syrian Army sent just under five-hundred soldiers, several tanks and heavy weapons to the countryside near Manbij.

On 9 June, a man was killed in a airdrop raid by SDF and Coalition forces in the village of al-Atallah, south of Al-Hasakah.

Furthermore, a large amount of ISIL fighters was reportedly openly gathering in a valley near Al-Qaryah Al-Namozajyah" in the Jabal Al-Amor area of the Syrian desert. This comes amid ISIL militants openly patrolling certain areas of the Syrian desert.

On the same day, Pro-Assad militiaman was killed and another was injured in an IED explosion in the town of Tell Shihab, Daraa.

On 10 June, eleven farmworkers were killed after a landmine exploded underneath their car in the village of Deir al-Adas, Daraa.

On the same day, an SDF fighter was shot dead in the town of Al-Busayrah, Deir ez-Zor.

Furthermore, amid high tensions between Turkey and Syria, it was reported that the Syrian Army had deployed a further two-thousand soldiers to the Manbij countryside in preparation for a possible Turkish offensive.

On 12 June, an SDF commander was shot dead by two ISIS insurgents in the town of Al-Busayrah.

On the same day, a Syrian Army engineer was killed whilst trying to dismantle an IED near Beit Jinn, Rif Dimashq.

On 13 June, 4 Syrian soldiers, including an officer, were killed in an attack by unidentified gunmen on a Syrian Army checkpoint near the town of Talbiseh.

On the same day, a Syrian soldier was shot dead by unidentified gunmen on the highway between Qorkas and Al-Qosaiba, Daraa.

On 14 June, two Asayish fighters were killed in clashes with smugglers in the village of Qarmagh, near Kobanî.

On the same day three members of the Al-Amshat division, operating as part of the SNA, along with another tribal SNA member, were killed in internal clashes in the Mount Simeon area, near Aleppo.

On 15 June, three fighters of the Sham Legion and a fighter of HTS were killed after Syrian forces shelled their positions on the Saraqib area of the Idlib frontline.

On the same day, a commander of the Syrian Army's security branch was shot dead by unknown gunmen in the town of Al-Jiza, Daraa.

On 16 June, at least 3 Syrian soldiers were killed and six others were injured after ISIS militants ambushed a Syrian military bus in the Syrian desert, close to the Al-Tanf area.

On the same day, a fighter of HTS was shot dead by forces of the Syrian Army on the Ftireh area of the Idlib frontline.

On 17 June, 5 Liwa al-Quds militiamen were killed after ISIS militants ambushed their military vehicle near Ark village, in the Al-Sukhnah desert.

On the same day, an SDF fighter was shot dead by ISIS gunmen in the town of Al-Busayrah.

On 18 June, 4 Turkish-backed opposition fighters and three civilians were killed in internal clashes in the western Aleppo countryside.

On the same day, 4 Syrian soldiers, including an officer, were killed after militants of Jaysh al-Nasr launched an attack on Syrian Army positions in Al-Fatatrah in the Al-Ghab Plain area of the Idlib frontline.

On 19 June, an opposition fighter was shot dead by a Syrian army sniper in the Al-Tuffahiyah area of the Idlib frontline.

On 20 June, 11 Syrian soldiers and two bus drivers were killed in an ambush by ISIS militants, targeting Syrian Army buses transporting soldiers on the highway in the Al-Jira area, between the cities of Homs and Raqqa. Further clashes continued in this area in the days after.

On 21 June, two Syrian government soldiers were blown up and killed in an IED explosion near the village of Jamla and four pro-government fighters were killed and four others wounded in an ambush by ISIL fighters east of the Al-Dumayr Military Airport; some of the casualties were from the National Defence Forces militia.

On the same day, according to SOHR, an SDF fighter was shot dead by suspected ISIS insurgents at Al-Asadiyah farm, north of Raqqa.

On 22 June, a government convoy was attacked by machine-gun fire near the town of Dumayr, northeast of Damascus, and a militant of Al-Fatah al-Mubin was reportedly blown up and killed by a landmine in the village of Tell Afis on the Idlib frontline.

On 23 June, SOHR reported that nine pro-government fighters and seven ISIL fighters were killed in the on-going clashes in Northeastern Syria, meaning a total of thirty pro-government fighters were killed in the four days.

On 24 June, six tribesmen were killed in internal tribal clashes in the village of Ghazila, south of Al-Qahtaniyah.

On 26 June, SOHR reported two SDF operatives were killed and five others were injured after suspected ISIS militants opened fire on an SDF military vehicle near the village of Ali Agha near Al-Yaarubiyah.

On the same day, SOHR reported a civilian was shot dead by insurgents in the city of As-Suwayda, southern Syria.

On 27 June, SOHR reported five people, including a former secretary of the Ba'ath Party, were killed after gunmen raided a house in the city of Al-Sanamayn, Daraa.

On 28 June, SOHR reported three government soldiers were killed after being shot by insurgents on a road near Jasim, Daraa.

On 29 June, SOHR reported nine fighters of the Sham Legion were killed after Syrian Army forces fired a heat seeker missile at their position on the Basfoun frontline, west of Aleppo, on the Idlib frontline.

== July ==
On 1 July, a Syrian Arab Army soldier was shot dead by an SNA sniper near Ayn Issa, north of Raqqa.

On 2 July, 4 SDF fighters, including a commander, were killed in an IED explosion whilst travelling between military checkpoints between Ayn Issa and Tel Al-Samen.

On the same day, a civilian was killed by Turkish shelling in the village of Jarad near Manbij, northern Syria.

On 3 July, a Syrian government soldier was killed and 3 others were abducted by gunmen during an armed attack on Syrian military checkpoint near As-Suwayda, southern Syria.

On the same day, 3 cousins were killed after being shot over a land dispute near Manbij.

Furthermore, 2 soldiers of the Syrian Army's Military Security branch were shot dead by gunmen in the town of Abtaa, Daraa.

On 4 July, 2 ISIL affiliates were killed in an SDF-backed Coalition airdrop operation on a house in the village of al-Zer, Deir ez-Zor.

On the same day, 2 Syrian soldiers were killed and 8 others were injured after NFL forces fired a rocket targeting a Syrian Army truck on the Anjara frontline, west of Aleppo.

Furthermore, a civilian was killed and three others were injured after Turkish artillery bombarded the village of Al-Houshan, west of Ayn Issa. A civilian was also killed and 2 others were injured by Syrian Army bombardment in the village of Maaret Elnaasan, Idlib.

On 5 July, soldiers of the Syrian Army's 8th Brigade were targeted by gunmen on the Al-Ghariyah Al-Sharqiyyah-Al-Misifrah road, Daraa. The attack left one Syrian soldier killed and 3 others wounded.

On 6 July, 2 Syrian soldiers were killed and 2 others were wounded after an IED exploded on a road near the town of Da'el, Daraa.

On the same day, 4 civilians of the same family, including 2 children, were shot dead by unknown gunmen in their house in Nasib, Daraa.

Furthermore, due to Turkish threats to invade Kurdish-held territories in northern Syria, Rojava declared a state of emergency.

Also, an opposition fighter was killed and 4 others were injured in a landmine explosion in Kansafra.

Later in the day, a soldier of the Iranian IRGC was killed and 3 others were injured after a landmine, likely planted by ISIS cells, exploded under their military vehicle near the town of Mahin.

On 7 July, a member of the Manbij Military Council was killed in a Turkish drone attack in the Al-A’rimah area near Manbij.

On the same day, a Lebanese Hezbollah officer was killed in an Israeli drone attack in the countryside north of Quneitra.

On 9 July, a Syrian soldier was shot dead by gunmen on a road on the outskirts of Al-Jabiliyah village in Quenitra countryside.

On 10 July, a tribesman was killed and 2 others were wounded in tribal infighting in Sajo village, in the Azaz countryside.

On the same day, an SDF fighter was shot dead and another was injured after suspected ISIS members opened fire on an SDF military vehicle in Himar Al-Ali, near Al-Kasrah.

On 11 July, a militant Al-Fateh al-Mubin was killed and 2 others were wounded after Syrian Army forces shelled Kafr Ammah on the Idlib frontline.

On the same day, 2 SDF fighters were shot dead by ISIS militants in Zar village, Deir ez-Zor.

Furthermore, a Syrian soldier was shot dead by ISIS insurgents whilst combing the Homs desert.

On 12 July, Maher al-Agal - one of the top five ISIL commanders - and his escort were killed in an American drone-launched airstrike on their motorcycle in Ghaltan village, near Jindires.

On the same day, a collaborator with Syrian military forces was shot dead in Nawa, Daraa.

Furthermore, a footballer was shot dead by suspected ISIS insurgents after they broke into a football stadium in the village of Al-Hawayej, Deir ez-Zor.

On 14 July, 3 NDF militiamen were blown up and killed in a landmine explosion whilst patrolling farmland near the town of Al-Huwaiz, Hama.

On 15 July, a commander of Suqour al-Sham was shot dead by gunmen near the town of Kamrouk in the Afrin countryside.

On the same day, 2 civilians were killed and another was severely injured by a landmine explosion in the village of Khirbat Al-Manasir in the south Aleppo countryside.

A civilian was also shot dead by unidentified gunmen in the village of Al-Shaykh Maskin, Daraa.

On 16 July, two militants of Ahrar al-Sharqiya were shot dead by unidentified gunmen in the village of Baruza, north of Aleppo. A Syrian government soldier was killed by a landmine explosion in Halfaya, Hama. A child died of injuries he sustained a day prior following the explosion of a remnant landmine in the village of Qurtal, near Kobanî.

After negotiations at the UN, Russia used its Security Council veto to reduce the planned delivery of aid to opposition areas of Syria from a year to six months.

On 17 July, the wife of a former opposition commander was killed and 6 of his family were wounded after an IED exploded at his house in Tafs, Daraa. An SDF fighter was shot dead by ISIS gunmen in Al-Hajjah village in the northern Deir Ezzor countryside. A fighter of Jaysh al-Izza was killed by a landmine planted by Syrian Army forces on the Bara area of the Idlib frontline.

On 18 July, 4 reconciled opposition fighters were shot dead in the western Daraa countryside.

On the same day, a drug dealer was shot and killed by Syrian Army forces after they raided a house in Maaraba, Daraa.

Also, 2 Syrian soldiers were killed by an IED explosion whilst conducting combing operations in southern Deir ez-Zor desert.

On 20 July, the leaders of Turkey, Russia and Iran met in Tehran. Erdoğan asked his peers to back Turkey’s anti-SDF incursion in Syria.

The same day, a fighter of the Iraqi Harakat Hezbollah al-Nujaba was killed and several others were injured after ISIS militants attacked their military vehicle near Al-Kom and Al-Tabiya villages in eastern Homs countryside. And a Syrian government soldier was killed in an infiltration attempt by opposition forces in the village of Al-Mahsanly, in the Manbij countryside.

On 21 July, 3 Syrian soldiers, including 2 officers, of the Ministry of the Interior were killed in an ambush by insurgents in the Gharz area, east of Daraa. An IED was also detonated when Syrian military reinforcements arrived, resulting in the injury of 2 other soldiers.

At midnight on 22 July, three government soldiers were killed and seven wounded in an Israeli missile attack on the outskirts of Damascus.

On the same day, 7 civilians, including 4 children, were killed in a Russian airstrike on the village of al-Jadidah near the city of Jisr ash-Shughur, Idlib.

Later in the day, an opposition insurgent was killed in a shootout after Syrian Army forces raided a house in Al-Yadudah, Daraa.

Furthermore, 3 fighters of the YPJ were killed in a Turkish drone strike on their vehicle Qamishli and Al-Malkiyah in the Al-Hasakah Governorate.

Also, 2 militants of Ansar al-Tawhid were killed by Syrian Army bombardment on the Al-Fatera frontline in southern Idlib.

On 24 July, a civilian was killed and 3 others were injured after a rocket was fired from Kurdish-held areas on the village of Kuwait Al-Rahma in the Afrin countryside.

On the same day, 2 children were killed after a remnant landmine exploded at the Masraba Bridge in Damascus.

On 25 July, 2 fighters of the Hajin Military Council died of wounds they sustained after a shootout with suspected smugglers in the town of Diban, Dier ez-Zzor.

On the same day, a captain of the Syrian Army's 5th Division was killed in an IED explosion in the city of Daraa.

Also, a Syrian soldier was killed in a landmine explosion in the town of Dabsy Afnan, west of Raqqa.

On 26 July, 2 SDF fighters were killed in separate Turkish drone strikes in the northern countryside of Raqqa.

On the same day, 2 Turkish soldiers were killed by Syrian Army or Kurdish shelling on Kaljibrin town in Aleppo countryside.

Between late 26 July and 27 July, at least 17 gunmen were killed and over 40 were wounded in clashes between local militias in As-Suwayda Governorate in southern Syria.

Also on 27 July, a civilian was killed by Syrian Army artillery in the crossfire between Syrian forces and insurgents in the plains near Tafas, Daraa.

Furthermore, 2 civilians were shot dead by insurgents in Al-Sanamayn, Daraa.

On 28 July, 4 Asayish fighters were killed in a Turkish drone strike on their vehicle near Tel Al-Samn village in the northern countryside of Raqqa.

In the month of July 2022, 252 people were killed in Syria.

== August ==
On 1 August, an opposition fighter was killed by Syrian Army artillery fire on the village of Deir Sunbul on the Idlib frontline.

On the same day an SDF fighter was killed and 3 others were wounded during clashes with smugglers at a river crossing in Abu Hamam, Deir ez-Zor.

On 2 August, a Syrian soldier was shot dead by Al-Fatah al-Mubin militants on the Kafr Nabl frontline in Idlib.

On the same day, a civilian was blown up and killed by a remnant landmine in the Al-Maydan area of the Syrian Desert.

On 3 August, a militant of Tahrir al-Sham (HTS) was killed and 5 others were injured after Syrian Army forces fired a AGTM at their vehicle on the Basufan frontline.

On the same day, 2 SDF fighters were killed after insurgents opened fire on an SDF military vehicle and then fled on a motorbike in the village of Abriha, near Al-Busayrah, Deir ez-Zor. ISIS later claimed responsibility.

Also, a member of the Tel Tamr military council was blown up in a Turkish drone strike in the village of Tel Jumah in the Al-Hasakah countryside.

On 4 August, 4 Syrian soldiers were killed after ISIS militants attacked their positions in the Al-Mahr area near Jahar area in the Syrian desert.

On the same day, a civilian was shot dead by Turkish Border Guards whilst working on his land in Qoran village, in the Ayn al-Arab District.

On August 5, 2 civilians and a member of Syrian security forces were killed in clashes following a grenade attack in the Al-Maydan area of Aleppo.

Furthermore, a civilian was shot dead by insurgents in Tell Shihab, Daraa.

Also, a Syrian soldier was killed and a smuggler was injured in clashes on the Syria-Lebanon border near the Lebanese village of Al-Mashirfa, in the Qalamoun Mountains.

On August 6, 2 'Cadres' and 2 children were killed in a Turkish drone strike in the Al-Sina'a area of Qamishli city.

On August 7, 3 Ansar al-Turkestan militants were killed after Syrian Army forces fired an AGTM at a militants' vehicle on the Al-Hakourah area in the Al-Ghab Plain on the Idlib frontline.

Later in the day, an SDF fighter was shot dead by ISIS insurgents in the town of Al-Shuhayl, Deir ez-Zor.

On August 8, 3 Uzbek jihadis were killed after carrying out an attack on Syrian Army positions in the town of Jobas, near Saraqib on the Idlib frontline.

In Daraa, a man was shot dead by insurgents in the town of Tell Shihab. In the town of Elmah, Daraa, 3 people were killed, including a Syrian soldier and a woman, after IED blast destroyed a house.

Also, a female Asayish fighter was shot dead by suspected ISIS militants after they opened fire on an Asayish checkpoint in the city of Al-Thawrah, west of Raqqa.

On August 9, 3 non-Syrian Iranian-backed Pro-Assad militiamen were killed and 4 others were injured after ISIS militants attacked their military checkpoint on the outskirts of Al-Sukhnah in the Homs desert.

On the same day, 4 people were killed in two Turkish drone strikes near a UN COVID-19 hospital in the vicinity of Qamishli. A child was also killed and several other people were injured in large scale Turkish artillery bombardments on several settlements in the Qamishli countryside.

Also, an Iraqi commander of ISIS by the name of Abu Salem al-Iraqi was reported to have blown himself up after he was besieged by Syrian government forces in the village of Adwan, Daraa.

On August 10, 2 SDF fighters were killed and 3 others were injured after ISIS cells opened fire on an SDF military vehicle in Al-Zer village, Deir ez-Zor.

On the same day, two SDF fighters, including a commander, and a civilian were killed in a Turkish drone strike in the village of Mala Sobat in the Qamishli countryside.

On August 11, an NDF militiaman was found shot dead on the banks of the Euphrates River in the village of Al-Masrab, Deir ez-Zor.

Furthermore, two SNA fighters were killed in internal clashes in the city of Ras al-Ayn, in the Hasakah countryside.

On August 12, two fighters of the Syriac Military Council were killed by Turkish shelling in the town of Tell Tamer, north of Hasakah city.

Also, a Syrian government soldier was shot dead by insurgents in Daraa city.

On 14 August, Israel carried out a series of airstrikes on targets in Syria.

On 16 August, two Turkish soldiers were killed by rocket fire originating from Syria. Later 25 people, including at least government fighters, were killed in a series of Turkish artillery and airstrike attacks on military targets in the Kobanî area of northern Syria. In retaliation, on August 19, at least 14 civilians, including 5 children, were killed and 28 others are injured by a government rocket attack on a market in Al-Bab, Aleppo Governorate, Syria.

In late August, Turkey announced a thawing of relations with the Assad government, in a series of comments by the president on 20–21 August and foreign minister on 23 August, in the wake of anti-refugee sentiment in Turkey.

On 22 August, Russia carried out airstrikes on 13 communities in Idlib.

In late August, there was a series of skirmishes between Iranian-backed militias and US forces in Deir al-Zor, starting on 23 August. On 23 August, U.S. President Joe Biden ordered airstrikes against Islamic Revolutionary Guard Corps and Russia-linked groups in Syria in response to a rocket attack on 15 August near the U.S. military base in al-Tanf, Syria, which houses the Maghaweir al-Thowra rebel group, and an airstrike by the Russian military in an area held by the Syrian opposition. The U.S. strikes, which occurred in the early hours of the following day, used F-15 and F-16 jets and targeted eleven bunkers in Deir ez-Zor used to store weapons, according to the United States Central Command. Iran denied having any link to the sites. In the evening of 24 August, pro-Iranian militias executed a missile attack on the Conoco site and Green Village near al-Omar oil field which had injured three U.S. military service members. In retaliation, on 25 August, the United States conducted airstrikes with AC-130 gunships and Apache attack helicopters against Iranian-backed militia groups in Mayadin, Syria, killing at least three. This violence occurred in the context of tense negotiations between the US and Iran over Iran's nuclear programme.

On the tenth anniversary of the Daraya massacre on 26 August, the Syrian British Consortium released a report detailing the government's responsibility for 700 killings in the town.

On 28 August, the SDF launched an operation targeting ISIL sleeper cells in al-Hol detention camp, where violence had reached record levels.

In the month of August 2022, 291 people were killed in Syria.

== September ==
On 1 September, it was reported that a Canadian intelligence informant had been responsible for smuggling ISIL fighters, including Shamima Begum, from Turkey into Syria in 2015. Begum still remained stateless in an SDF detention camp in Syria.

On 2 September, diplomatic and intelligence sources told Reuters that Israel has intensified strikes on Syrian airports to disrupt Iran's increasing use of them to deliver arms to allies in the region.

In NW Syria, the government and its Russian allies continued their operations against rebel Idlib and Aleppo. On 8 September, seven civilians were killed and 15 others were injured by a Russian airstrike on a stone quarry near the village of Hafsarja in Idlib.

Fighting continued between ISIL and the Syrian Democratic Forces and its pro-government allies in NE Syria. On 11 September, ISIL released footage of their fighters lining up six abducted SDF fighters against a wall and then executing them by shooting them near the village of Ruwaished, north of Deir ez-Zor. On 13 September, four pro-Assad militiamen were killed and several others were injured in clashed with ISIS fighters in the desert near Palmyra.

On 16 September, five people, including three SDF police officers, were killed in a Turkish drone strike near a Syrian Army base in Ayn Issa.

On 17 September, five government soldiers were killed by an Israeli airstrike on the Damascus International Airport.

On 18 September, Syrian Army forces shelled the town of Atarib near the frontline in the western Aleppo countryside, killing three fighters of Tahrir al-Sham. One Turkish soldier was killed by rocket-fire originating from Syria.

On 20 September, a Syrian soldier was killed and two others were injured after an AGTM was fired at a Syrian Army post on the al-Malaga area of the southern Idlib frontline.

On 21 September, three ISIS fighters were killed and another was captured after SDF forces foiled an attack on the al-Hawl prisoner camp in northern Syria.

On 22 September, at least 89 mainly Syrian and Lebanese migrants drowned off the coast of Tartus after trying to sail to Europe from Lebanon.

On the same day, a Syrian government army post was attacked by ISIS militants near the village of Al-Saan, in the Hama desert, killing the government soldiers.

On 25 September, a military bus carrying Syrian government soldiers on the Al-Raqqah-Al-Salmiyah road in Hama governorate was attacked by ISIL fighters, killing two Syrian soldiers.

On 27 September, two SDF fighters were killed in a Turkish drone strike on their car in the town of Al-Muabbada, in the al-Hasakah countryside. The government said that two children were killed by Turkish shelling in the Abu Rasin area of Al-Hasakah Subdistrict, northern Syria.

During 27–28 September, at least five ISIS militants were killed in Russian airstrikes in the Syrian desert.

In the month of September 2022, SOHR recorded 282 people killed in Syria.

== October ==
=== General events ===
In summer 2022, there were reports that Syrian diplomats had met with Turkish diplomats, at an international conference. In late 2022, Turkish President Erdogan expressed openness to meeting with Assad. Some analysts attributed this new attitude to Erdogan's desire to improve his popularity with voters, ahead of upcoming elections; and also, to improve Turkey's relations with Russia, which has forces deployed in Syria.

Various rights advocates expressed concerns that improved relations between Syrian President Assad and Turkish President Erdogan might eventually be detrimental to Syrian refugees in Turkey. Also, there were reports of an increase of attacks on Syrian immigrants living in Turkey. In October 2022, some NGOs stated that thousands of Syrian refugees in Turkey were being forcibly returned to Syria by Turkish forces, and specifically being forced to relocate to the northern zone of Syria controlled by Turkey. The Commander of the SDF, Mazloum Abdi, expressed concerns that normalization of relations between Assad and Erdogan might be detrimental to Kurdish communities.

In October 2022, the United Nations called for a "nationwide ceasefire" in Syria. The U.N. special envoy for Syria, Geir Pedersen, met with Syria's foreign minister in Damascus; afterwards, Pedersen said that Syria's economic situation is “extremely difficult as close to 15 million people are in need for humanitarian assistance." One of the main local military conflicts was an internal conflict, amongst factions of the Turkish-backed Syrian National Army (SNA).

=== By date ===
On October 3, suspected ISIS fighters targeted members of the Syrian regime's National Security forces east of Deir ez-Zor, killing 3 of them and injuring another 4.

On the same day, a fighter of the Palestinian Liwa al-Quds was killed in clashes with suspected ISIS fighters in the Jebel Bishri area.

On October 4, according to Middle East Monitor, two fighters of the opposition Sultan Murad Division were killed and 6 others were wounded in an SDF infiltration attempt on the outskirts of Al-Jatal village, Aleppo.

On October 6, a pro-Assad Iranian-backed militiaman was killed by suspected ISIL sniper fire in the Mayadin desert.

At midnight on October 6, a suspected high ranking Islamic State militant by the name of Rakkan Wahid al-Shammri, Abu Hayil, was killed by American special forces during a raid in the village of Muluk Saray near Qamishli in the Al-Hasakah Governorate. Later that day, a helicopter raid killed two senior Islamic State leaders in Qamishli, including the Islamic State's deputy leader in Syria, Abu 'Ala, and Abu Mu'ad al-Qahtani, an official responsible for prisoner affairs. However, CENTCOM said that no U.S. military personnel or civilians were killed or injured in the operation.

On 10 October, an American drone strike killed a member of ISIS in the village of Hamam al-Turkman near Tell Abyad.

On 12 October, clashes began between Hayat Tahrir al-Sham and the Levant Front in the Aleppo governorate.

On the same day, clashes started between ISIS militants and SAA forces after ISIS fighters attacked Syrian military positions in the Al-Duweir region near Mayadin, Deir ez-Zor. The clashes killed 9 Syrian soldiers, 3 ISIS fighters and 3 civilians.

On 13 October, at least 18 Syrian military personnel were killed and 27 others were wounded after an explosion targeted a Syrian military bus in the Al-Sabboura area of the Rif Dimashq countryside.

On 15 October, 4 Pro-Assad gunmen and 10 ISIS fighters were killed in clashes in the town of Jasim, Daraa. A senior Iraqi ISIS militant by the name of Abdulrahman al-Iraqi was killed in the fighting.

On 16 October, at least six rebel fighters affiliated to Suqur Al-Sham were killed after Russian airstrikes targeted a military base between Azaz and Afrin.

On 17 October, an ISIS suicide bomber blew himself up and 3 other ISIS members after the Syrian army launched a security operation in Jasim, Daraa, following clashes a few days before.

On the same day, 2 NDF militiamen were killed and 5 others were wounded after their vehicle drove over a mine in the al-Talahej area, east of Hama.

Between 22–23 October at least one Syrian soldier and one opposition fighter were killed during intense artillery duels on the Idlib frontline.

In October, the United Nations called for a "nationwide ceasefire" in Syria. The U.N. special envoy for Syria, Geir Pedersen, met with Syria's foreign minister in Damascus; afterwards, Pedersen said that Syria's economic situation is “extremely difficult as close to 15 million people are in need for humanitarian assistance."

In late 2022, Turkish President Erdogan expressed openness to meeting with Assad. Some analysts attributed this new attitude to Erdogan's desire to improve his popularity with voters, ahead of upcoming elections; and also, to improve Turkey's relations with Russia, which has forces deployed in Syria.

In October 2022, a rights group raised concerns that thousands of Syrian refugees in Turkey were being forcibly returned to Syria by Turkish forces, and specifically being forced to relocate to the northern zone of Syria controlled by Turkey. Various rights advocates were stated to be concerned that improved relations between Syrian President Assad and Turkish President Erdogan might eventually be detrimental to Syrian refugees in Turkey. Also, there were reports of an increase of attacks on Syrian immigrants living in Turkey.

On 28 October, at least 3 people were killed in a suicide bombing in the city of Daraa.

The SOHR reported that 344 people were killed in Syria in October 2022.

== November ==
Between 31 October and 15 November, 16 ISIS fighters, 6 Pro-Assad militiamen and 6 civilians were killed in clashes in and around the city of Daraa.

On 4 November, a commander of the Liwa al-Quds militia was killed and several others were wounded after a mine was activated whilst searching for ISIS cells in the desert south of Deir ez-Zor.

On 6 November, Syrian government forces shelled a camp for the displaced in the rebel-held northwestern part of Idlib, killing 9 and wounding dozens.

Between 5–7 November, 13 Syrian soldiers and 3 HTS fighters were killed in clashes on the Sahl al-Ghab area of the Idlib frontline.

On 9 November, 14 people, including some Iranian militiamen, were killed in an Israeli airstrike in the town of Abu Kamal near the border with Iraq.

On 13 November, 2 Syrian soldiers were killed and 3 others were wounded by 4 Israeli airstrikes on Shayrat Airbase in Homs.

On the same day, two Syrian soldiers were killed in an ISIS ambush after an IED was activated against their vehicle on the Homs-Palmyra road.

On the same day, a bombing occurred in Istanbul's Beyoğlu district in Turkey, killing 6 and wounding 81. Turkish authorities announced they suspected the PKK and the Syrian PYD of carrying out the attack.

On 19 November, in the early hours of the morning, 4 Syrian soldiers were killed and another was injured in Israeli airstrikes on a Syrian military position on the Tartus coastline.

In the early hours of 20 November, Turkey launched Operation Claw-Sword in Syria and Iraq in response to the recent Istanbul bombing. Initial attacks in Syria came in the form of airstrikes against Kurdish and Syrian Government positions in northern Syria, such as Kobani and Tell Tamer.

On the same day, 4 Syrian soldiers were killed in an ISIS ambush whilst patrolling the desert west of Palmyra.

On 22 November, 5 civilians were killed and another 5 were wounded after rockets were launched into the city of Azaz in northern Syria. The rockets were likely fired by Kurdish forces as part of recent clashes between Rojava and Turkey.

On the same day an SDF fighter was shot dead in Al-Busayrah by ISIS insurgents.

On 27 November, 4 drug smugglers were killed in clashes with the Jordanian army on the Syria-Jordan border near As-Suwayda.

On 29 November, 2 Syrian soldiers were killed after ISIS forces ambushed and opened fire on their military vehicle at the T3 junction about 40 km east of Palmyra.

In November 2022, at least 3 ISIS fighters were killed in Russian airstrikes.

In the month of November 2022, the SOHR reported 348 people were killed in Syria.

== December ==
On 1 December, clashes broke out between ISIS and Syrian Army forces in the desert near Palmyra, killing at least 3 Syrian soldiers.

First week of December was marked by the beginning of large-scale demonstrations in the southern Druze-majority city of Suweida; headquarters of Suweida governorate. Angry protestors chanted slogans against the Assad family; calling for the overthrow of the regime. The protests resulted in the death of one policeman and one protestor. On December 4, over 200 Druze protestors stormed and occupied the office of Suweyda's governor and burned portraits of Bashar al-Assad.

On 6 December, Al Jazeera reported that Turkey had set a deadline of 2 weeks for SDF forces to leave the areas of Manbij, Tell Rifat and Kobani and that a failure to do so would result in a new ground offensive as part of Operation Claw-Sword.

Between 6–7 December, 2 Syrian soldiers and a fighter of HTS were killed in clashes on the Idlib frontline.

On 6 December, 2 ISIS fighters and 9 Syrian militiamen, some of which were Afghan, were killed in clashes in the desert in the eastern Homs countryside.

On 7 December, civilians found the body of an executed SDF fighter in the Al-Busayrah area.

On the same day, Syrian forces lost contact with a patrol of the 'Homeland Defence Forces', a militia within the Syrian Armed Forces, whilst they were combing the al-Tabani desert area for ISIS cells northwest of Deir ez-Zor

On 10 December, an ISIS militant was killed and 3 Asayish fighters were wounded during a Kurdish-launched raid on a house in the city of Raqqa.

On 11 December, at least 2 Syrian soldiers were killed in an Inghimasi attack by Tahrir al-Sham militants on a Syrian Army position on the outskirts of the village of Dadikh on the Idlib frontline. The position was destroyed by HTS fighters after the attack.

On the same day, HTS forces attacked Syrian military positions at Al-Bayda village in the Turkmen mountains on the Latakia/Idlib frontline, killing 3 Syrian soldiers.

In the early morning on 12 December, American forces launched a raid on a house in the village of Al-Zor in the eastern Deir ez-Zor desert. 2 ISIS fighters were killed in the raid including a prominent local leader by the name of 'Anas'.

On 12 December, under the cover of fog, ISIS cells launched an attack on Syrian forces in the Al-Shula area, 30 km south of Deir ez-Zor. 6 Syrian soldiers/militiamen were killed in the attack and a number of others were wounded.

The next day, following previous clashes, ISIS militants temporarily took control of the town of Al-Kawm for an entire day using the fog to their advantage.

On 15 December, ISIS forces ambushed a convoy of the Syrian NDF militia on the Ithriya -Al-Raqqa road in the Hama desert. The ambush began following the detonation of a landmine under the militiamen's car, killing 3 NDF fighters immediately. Brief clashes took place between ISIS forces and the militiamen, another 2 NDF fighters were killed in the clashes.

On the same day, Syrian forces discovered and confiscated a large ISIS weapons cache in the Deir ez-Zor countryside.

On 18 December, at least 3 Syrian soldiers were killed in a HTS infiltration on Syrian positions near the village of Arbikh near Taftanaz, north of Saraqib on the Idlib frontline. HTS released footage of the attack the same day.

On the same day, HTS also launched a similar infiltration offensive on a Syrian military position in the town of Qubtan Al-Jabal in the western Aleppo countryside, killing at least 3 Syrian soldiers and then blowing up the building Syrian forces had been occupying. Footage of the attack was released by HTS.

On 19 December, a mine planted by suspected ISIS militants was detonated targeting forces of the Syrian army in the desert around Mayadin. 6 Syrian soldiers were killed in the explosion.

On 20 December, a British drone targeted with 2 missiles and destroyed the house of Basa’ Ahmed al-Sawadi in al-Bab, who is suspected to be in charge of sabotage or finances in ISIS’s Syria Province.

On the same day, suspected ISIL gunmen on a motorcycle shot at a Syrian army vehicle in the Homs desert region, killing 2 Syrian soldiers.

On the same day, 2 Syrian soldiers were wounded after an Israeli airstrike on an alleged Hezbollah position near Damascus.

The SOHR reported that the recent increase of attacks by HTS on the Idlib frontline was due to potential talks between Turkey, Russia and Syria and that HTS was launching a campaign of attacks as a way of rejecting any deal made on the 'de-escalation zone' in Idlib.

On 22 December, as part of HTS's new Idlib campaign, 7 Syrian soldiers and 3 HTS fighters were killed in clashes on the Idlib frontline.

On 25 December, 6 fighters of the National Front for Liberation were killed after Syrian army and Kurdish forces advanced on the village of Burj Haider in the Afrin countryside, capturing some positions from the militants.

On the same day, ISIS released a video showing a gun execution of 2 captured Syrian army soldiers in the Al-Rasafah desert region south of Raqqa.

On 26 December, SDF spokesman Sianand Ali said, five men, two of whom were wearing explosive belts, attacked several SDF facilities in Raqqa. They clashed with SDF checkpoints outside of an area that contains the SDF's Internal Security Forces headquarters, anti-terrorism units, and around 200 ISIS prisoners. During the clashes, one of the suicide bombers exploded, killing six people. Of the six killed, three were SDF soldiers, and the other three were Asayish policemen. SDF commander Mazloum Abdi reported that there were an unspecified number of wounded, although it was later revealed ten were injured. Following the attack, ISIS claimed responsibility. The group stated the attack was in retribution for women at al-Hol camp.

Later that day, 3 Pro-Assad fighters were killed and 5 others were wounded by insurgents in an attack on a military post in the village of Al-Naimah, Daraa.

On 29 December, 3 Syrian National Army fighters were killed by in a heat-seeking ATGM fired by Syrian Army forces on the Mare' frontline, north of Aleppo. Later that day, the SDF announced that they were launching an offensive against ISIS, called Operation al-Jazeera Thunderbolt. US forces would also be involved in coordinating the offensive. ISIS also conducted attacks afterwards in the Deir ez-Zor area, and the SDF also claimed to have countered some of these attacks.

On the same day, at least 12 civilian oil workers were killed after ISIS militants detonated an IED targeting and destroying a bus of workers in the al-Taim oilfield in the Deir ez-Zor desert.

Furthermore, as part of increasing Islamic State attacks in the Syrian desert, 5 Syrian soldiers and a NDF militiaman were killed after Islamic State operatives raided a Syrian military position in the desert near Palmyra.

On 30 December, 4 Pro-Assad militiamen were killed by a landmine explosion, likely planted by ISIS militants, during combing operations in the Al-Rasafah desert south of Raqqa.

At least 7 ISIS militants were killed in Russian airstrikes in December 2022.

As per ACLED, at least 5,642 people were killed by the war in Syria during 2022.
