= 2019 in Iraq =

- Decades: 1990s; 2000s; 2010s; 2020s
- See also: Other events of 2019; List of years in Iraq

Events of 2019 in Iraq.

== Incumbents ==
- President: Barham Salih
- Prime Minister: Adil Abdul-Mahdi

== Events ==
=== January ===
- 24 January – Iraqi parliament approves the yearly budget after weeks of deadlock.
- 26 January – After a 16 months ban, Türkiye allows flights to the city of Sulaimaniyah to resume.

=== March ===
- 11 March – Iranian president Rohani visits Iraq for the first time since becoming president in 2013.
- 21 March – Mosul ferry sinking in the Tigris river results in about 100 dead revelers who were celebrating the Kurdish the new year and Iraqi mothers day.

=== April ===
- 17 April – The Iraqi parliament votes on a bill to ban several video games, such as PUBG and Fortnite, accusing them of being harmful and too violent.

=== May ===
- 20 May – A rocket lands near US embassy in Baghdad with no casualties.

=== June ===
- 27 June – Iraqi protesters storm the embassy of Bahrain in Baghdad over the country hosting a US sponsored workshop on Palestine. Bahrain responded by recalling their envoy to Iraq.

=== July ===
- 5 July – The ancient ruins of Babylon are listed in the UNESCO World Heritage Sites list after decades of campaigning.

=== August ===
- 20 August – Popular Mobilization, a Shia-dominated military group, blames the United States and Israel for an explosion at Balad airbase in Salahuddin province, about 80 km (50 miles) north of Baghdad.

=== September ===
- 10 September – 31 people killed and 100 injured due to a stampede that occurred during Ashura commemorations in the city of Karbala.
- 20 September – A bomb planted in a bus explosion kills 12 and wounds several others outside the city of Karbala.
- 30 September – Iraq reopens a border-crossing with Syria after 8 years of closure.

=== October ===
- 1 October – anti government Protests break out all across Iraq. The Iraqi government declared a curfew in few cities as well as limit social media and internet access in an attempt to suppress the protests.
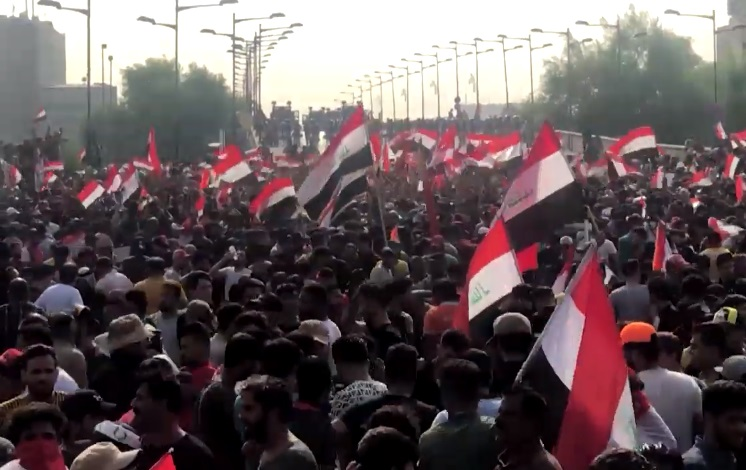
- Protesters in Baghdad, 1 October 2019
  9 October – The death toll of classes between security forces and protesters rises to around 110 with 6,000 wounded since the beginning of the protests. Iraq's prime minister declares 3 days of mourning for those killed.
- 11 October – Ayatollah Ali al-Sistani, Iraq’s senior Shia cleric demands the Iraqi government investigate the violence against demonstrators.
- 25 October– A fresh wave of protests is met with violence leaving 40 dead and hundreds injured.
- 28 October – The Iraqi government institutes a curfew as the total death toll of the protests climbs to 200 since their start on the 1st of October. Protesters defy the curfew and refuse to disband.

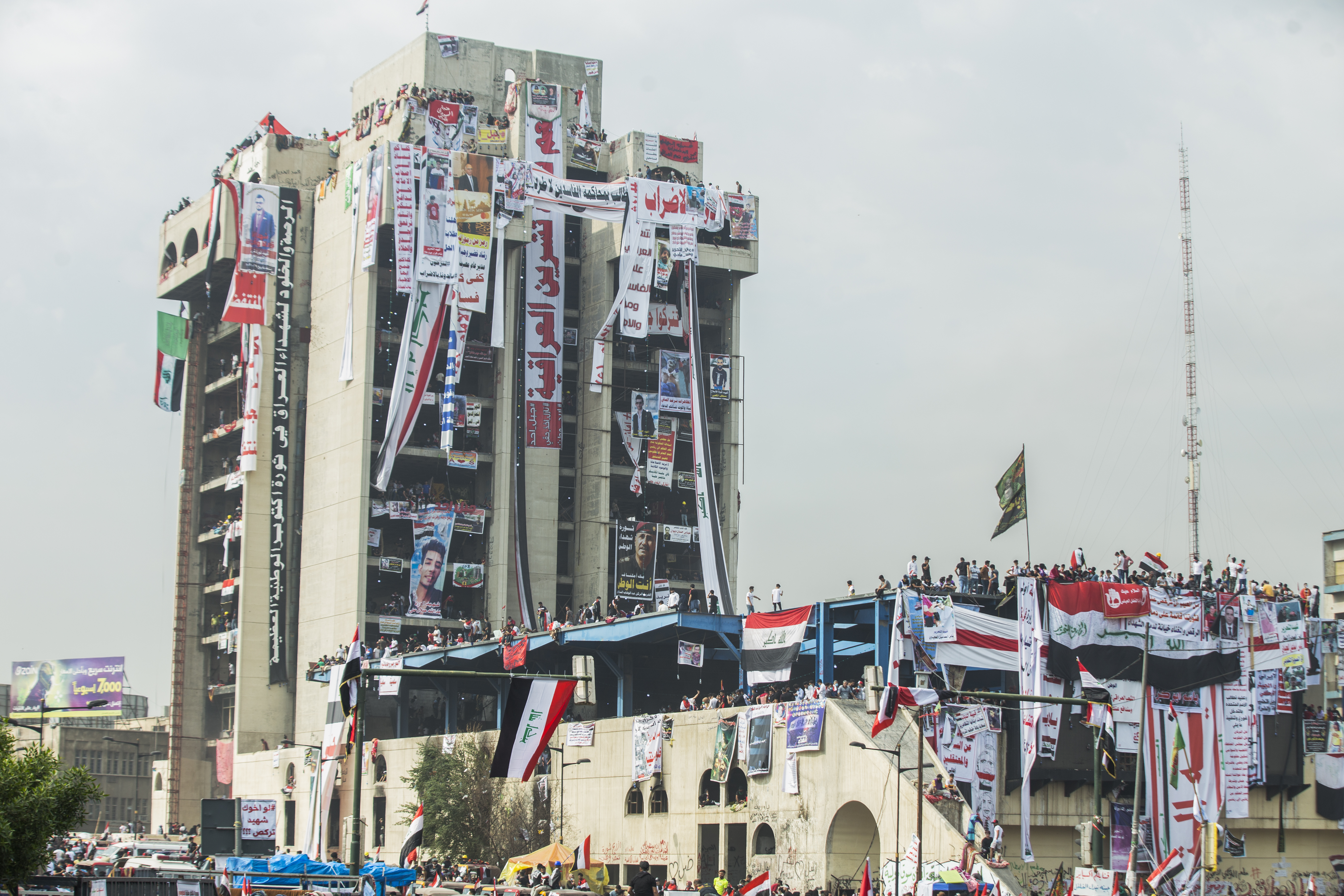
Protesters occupy the building known as the Turkish restaurant in Baghdad

=== November ===
- 4 November – Iraqi protesters storm the Iranian consulate in Karbala, 3 people are killed as security forces fire on the protesters to disperse them.
- 17 November – The protest expand as protestors seal of several bridges and vital roads in Baghdad contracting traffic. Thousands of students join the protests as calls for a general strike continued.
- 27 November – Iraqi protesters storm and burn down the Iranian consulate in southern city of Najaf.
- 28 November – 34 protesters are killed in the city of Nasiriyah, and another 18 are killed in Najaf, in what was described as the deadliest day of the protests.
- 30 November – Iraqi prime minister Adel Abd al- Mehdi formally submits his resignation to the parliament.

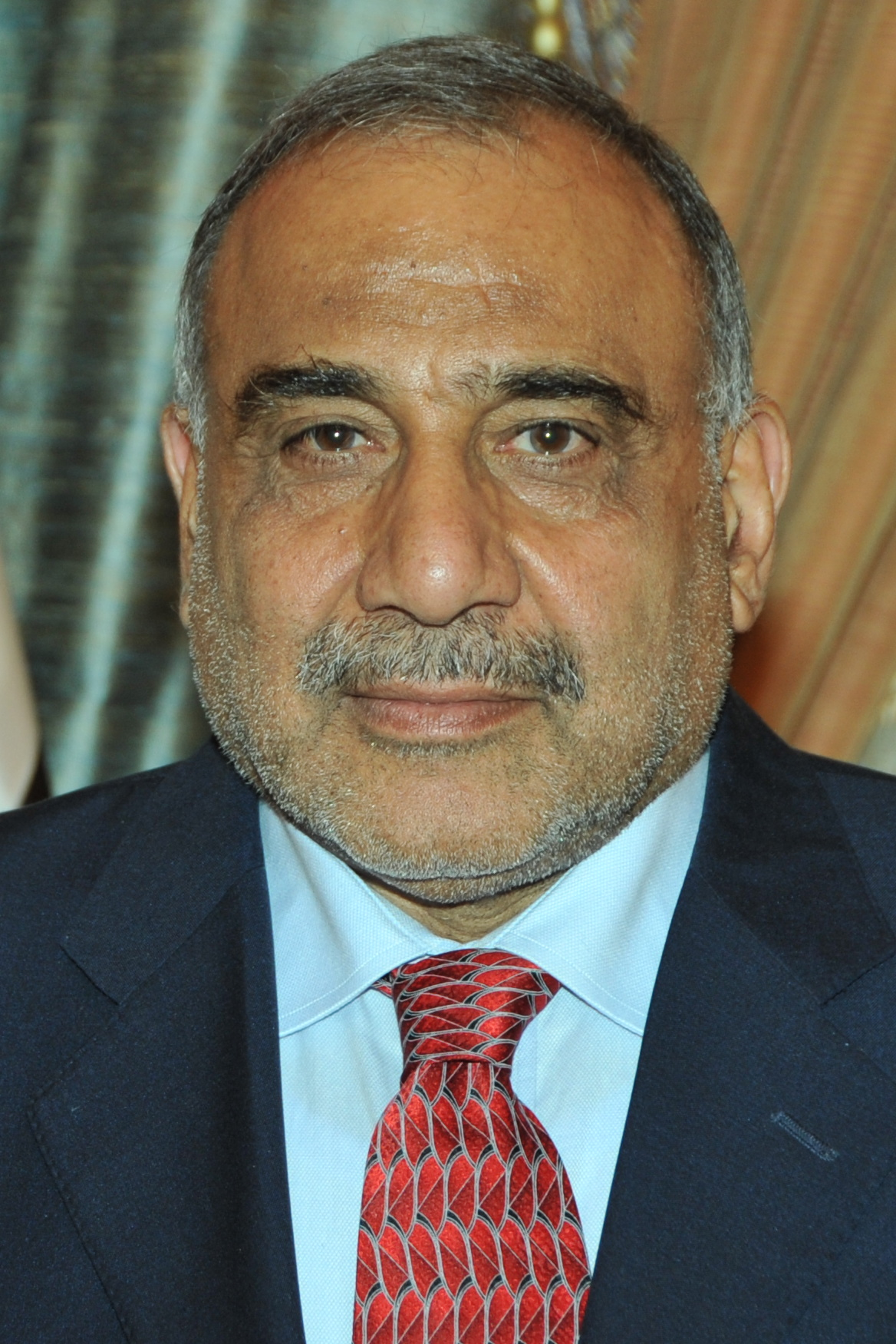
Prime Minister Adel Abd Al-Mahdi, Resigned on November 30, 2019

=== December ===
- 1 December – Iraqi parliament accepts the prime minister's resignation during an emergency session, without naming a replacement.
- 6 December – Unidentified gunmen open fire on protesters camped at Al-Tahrir square in Baghdad, killing 25 and wounding another 130 protesters.
- 29 December – The united states launch airstrikes at a base associated with the Kataib Hezbollah Iraqi militia, killing 25 people.
- 31 December – Iraqi protesters, angry at the American airstrikes, attack the US embassy compound in Baghdad.

== Deaths ==
- 18 January- Lamia Al-Gailani Werr, 80, Iraqi archaeologist.
- 28 January- Tahseen Said, 86, Iraqi politician, Emir of the Yazidis (since 1944).
- 2 February - Alaa Mashzoub, 50, Iraqi novelist and writer, expert on the History of the Jews in Iraq, shot.
- 3 May - George Hanna, 90, Iraqi-American basketball player.
- 13 May - Kochavi Shemesh, 75, Iraqi-born Israeli lawyer and social activist, leader of the Black Panthers protest movement.
- 26 May - Qays Abd al-Hussein al-Yasiri, 78, Iraqi media scholar, academic and poet.
- 7 July- Mohammad Hussaini Shahroudi, 93, Iraqi Marja'.
- 29 October - Safaa Al Sarai, 26, activist
