= Abdulameer al-Hamdani =

Iraqi archaeologist and politician (1967–2022)

Minister of Culture
- In office 18 December 2018 – 6 June 2020
- President: Barham Salih
- Prime Minister: Adil Abdul-Mahdi
- Preceded by: Faryad Rawandozi
- Succeeded by: Hassan Nazim

Personal details
- Born: 1 May 1967 Nasiriyah, Iraqi Republic
- Died: 29 April 2022 (aged 54) Nasiriyah, Iraq
- Education: University of Baghdad

Abdulameer M. Al-Dafar Al-Hamdani (1 May 1967 – 29 April 2022) was an archaeologist and politician who served as the minister of culture of Iraq between 2018 and 2020.

== Early life and education ==
Hamdani was born in Nasiriyah on 1 May 1967. His father was illiterate and had a large family who lived in a reed hut in a village in the Mesopotamian Marshes. He wanted his children to have an education, so he asked the Iraqi government to provide a teacher and they sent members of the Communist Party of Iraq to act as teachers.

Hamdani went on to go to University of Baghdad, graduating in 1987 with a degree in Ancient Archaeology. He was the director of Nasiriyah Museum and director of Antiquities for Dhi Qar Governorate from 2003 to 2009. From 2007 he was also a lecturer at the University of Dhi Qar. He created an atlas of archaeological sites using GPS and satellite images, including 1200 new sites that had not previously been documented. Hamdani worked with the Italian army - who were responsible for security in Dhi Qar from 2003 to 2006 - to protect archaeological sites, declaring that "'we have 800 sites and one million thieves ... I am ready to work with the Devil in order to protect these sites.''

In 2010 he started at Stony Brook University in New York where he co-directed a joint Iraqi-American mission to excavate the site at Tel Sakhariyah near the ancient city of Ur. He completed his master's degree there in 2013, which he followed with a PhD in 2015.

Following the capture of Mosul by ISIS, they started to destroy ancient monuments that they deemed to be blasphemous. Hamdani organised a protest against the demolition of Nimrud, saying that "thousands of years of history are being smashed by the hammers of ignorance, with each destroyed statue, a story is forgotten”.

== Minister of Culture ==
The general election in May 2018 returned the most divided parliament since the invasion of Iraq in 2003. After eight months of negotiations, Adil Abdul Mahdi was nominated as Prime Minister to head a "government of technocrats". His first nominee for the minister of culture was Hassan al-Rubaie, a commander of the Asa'ib Ahl al-Haq (AAH) militia, who was strongly opposed by other parties. Two months later the Prime Minister nominated Hamdani as minister of culture with the backing of AAH and he was approved by the Council of Representatives. His term ended in 2020.

== Death ==
Hamdani died from cancer in Nasiriyah on 29 April 2022.
