= Qays Abd al-Hussein al-Yasiri =

Iraqi media historian and academic (1941–2019)

- قيس عبد الحسين الياسري
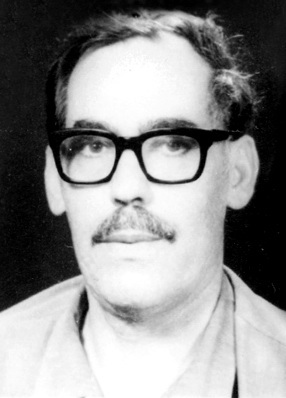
- Qays al-Yasiri, 1970s
- Born: Qays Abd al-Hussein Aziz al-Yasiri; 1941; Al-Khayrat, Al-Hindiya, Kingdom of Iraq
- Died: 26 May 2019 (aged 78); Baghdad, Iraq
- Education: Baghdad University, Cairo University, Warsaw University
- Occupations: Media historian; journalist; academic; poet
- Writing career
- Language: Arabic

Qays Abd al-Hussein al-Yasiri (Arabic: قيس عبد الحسين الياسري, romanized: Qays ʻAbd al-Ḥusayn al-Yāsirī; 1941 – 26 May 2019) was an Iraqi media historian, academic and poet, best known for his studies on early Iraqi mass media. He graduated from the universities of Baghdad in 1972, Cairo in 1976 and Warsaw in 1986. In his professional career, he moved between several jobs, as he worked as journalist, media official and assistant professor. His only poetry collection published in 1970. He left several books about media and wrote various essays. Al-Yasiri died at the age of 78 in Baghdad.

== Biography ==
Qais Abd al-Hussein Aziz Al-Yasiri was born in 1941 in the village of Al-Khayrat, Al-Hindiya, Karbala Governorate, where he grew up and studied. Then he went to Baghdad and obtained a Bachelor of Journalism from the College of Arts at Baghdad University in 1972, and a Master of Mass Communication from the Faculty of Mass Communication at Cairo University in 1976, and a Ph.D. in Journalism from Warsaw University, 1986.

He returned to his homeland and worked in journalism as an editor and editor-in-chief. He worked for the Iraqi News Agency from 1960 to 1978. After that, he began his academic career as an assistant professor of journalistic editing in the Department of Media, College of Arts, University of Bagdad. He began writing poetry in 1956 and published his first poems in 1959, and continued to publish his poetry and critical and cultural essays in 1960s and 1970s. He left Ba'athist Iraq to Libya in 1997. He was appointed as a teacher at Al-Fateh University and the Libyan Academy for Postgraduate Studies. He taught media economics, specialized media, and educational media. Al-Yasiri returned to Iraq in 2011, worked as head of the journalism department at Ahl al-Bayt University in Karbala.

Al-Yasiri died on 26 May 2019 in Baghdad.

== Works ==
- Arabic: الصحافة العراقية والحركة الوطنية:من نهاية الحرب العالمية الثانية حتى ثورة 14 تموز 1958, romanized: Ṣiḥāfah al-ʻIrāqīyah wa-al-ḥarakah al-waṭanīyah : min nihāyat al-Ḥarb al-ʻĀlamīyah al-Thānīyah ḥattá Thawrat 14 Tammūz 1958, lit. 'Iraqi journalism and the national movement, as from the end of the 2nd world war up the revolution of 14th. July 1958', 1978
- Arabic: أولويات الحزن والفرح, romanized: Awlawīyāt al-ḥuzn wa-al-faraḥ, poetry collection, 1970
- Arabic: حرية الصحافة في العراق 1921 - 1932, 1981
- Arabic: الخبر الصحفي دراسة نظرية وتطبيقات, 1987
- Arabic: فن المقابلة والتحقيق الصحفي, 1991
- Arabic: الفنون الصحفية, 1993
