= Hatra District =

Hatra District قضاء الحضر
- District
- Interactive map of Hatra District
- Country: Iraq
- Governorate: Nineveh Governorate
- Time zone: UTC+3 (AST)

Hatra District (Arabic: قضاء الحضر) is a district of Nineveh Governorate, Iraq.

== History ==
On January 22, 2022, three IS suspects died in an airstrike by Iraqi authorities after the 2022 Diyala massacre. Two of them were IS leaders.

On February 8, 2022, the Iraqi Armed Forces launched an airstrike near Hatra city against the Islamic State, killing seven IS members.
