= George Hanna (basketball) =

Iraqi basketball player (1928–2019)

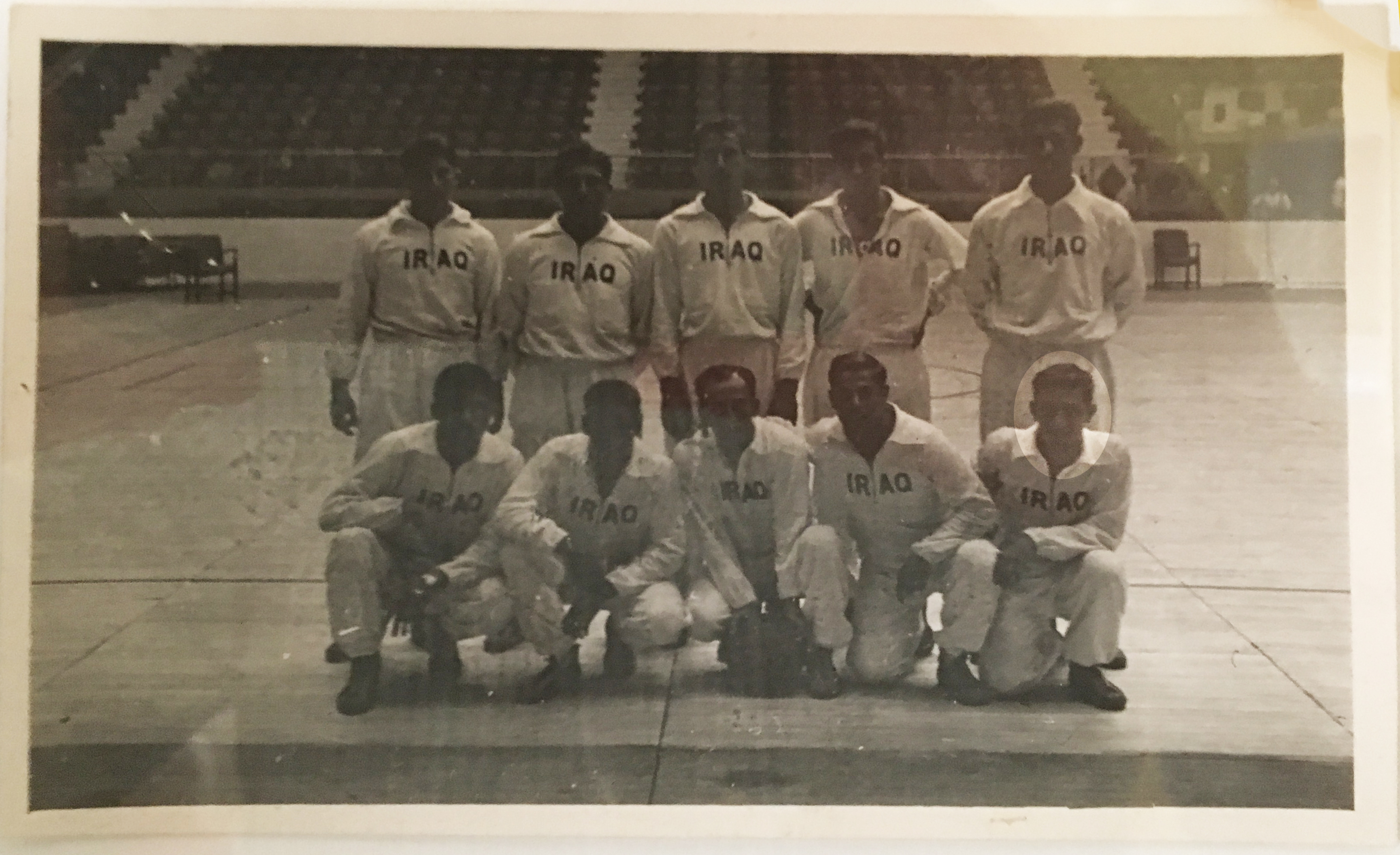
- Iraqi National Basketball Team 1948

Personal information
- Nationality: Iraqi
- Born: 13 May 1928 Iraq
- Died: 3 May 2019 (aged 90) St. George, Utah, United States

Sport
- Sport: Basketball

George Hanna or Hanna Jurgis (13 May 1928 – 3 May 2019), later known as John Hanna Hallaq, was an Iraqi basketball player. He competed in the men's tournament at the 1948 Summer Olympics.

Hanna later immigrated to the United States in 1958, and attended Weber State College, University of California, Los Angeles, and the University of Washington (PhD). After obtaining his PhD, he became a professor of International Business & Marketing at the University of Idaho in Moscow, Idaho and Washington State University in Pullman, Washington until his retirement in 1996. Hanna died in St. George, Utah in 2019 at the age of 90.
