= Maaret Elnaasan =

Maaret Elnaasan معارة النعسان
- Village
- Location in Syria
- Coordinates: 36°2′8″N 36°50′19″E
- Country: Syria
- Governorate: Idlib
- District: Idlib District
- Subdistrict: Taftanaz Nahiyah

Population (2004)
  - Total: 8,375
- Time zone: UTC+2 (EET)
  - Summer (DST): UTC+3 (EEST)
- City Qrya Pcode: C3935

Maaret Elnaasan (Arabic: معارة النعسان) is a Syrian village located in Taftanaz Nahiyah in Idlib District, Idlib. According to the Syria Central Bureau of Statistics (CBS), Maaret Elnaasan had a population of 8375 in the 2004 census.

== Syrian Civil War ==
On 12 February 2022, 6 civilians were killed after Syrian army artillery bombarded the village, that as of 2022, is under the control of the Syrian Salvation Government.
