= Sami Mahdi =

Iraqi writer and poet (1940–2022)

- سامي مهدي
- Born: 1940; Baghdad
- Died: 2022 (aged 81–82)
- Occupations: Poet, writer

Sami Mahdi Abbas (1940 – September 1, 2022) was an Iraqi writer and poet.

== Life ==
Sami Mahdi was born in Baghdad, studied at the College of Arts at the University of Baghdad, where he specialized in economics. He served as the director general of the Department of Cultural Affairs at the Ministry of Culture and Information, and also held the position of Director General of Radio and Television. He was the editor-in-chief of several newspapers and magazines, including Al-Muthaqqaf Al-Arabi, Al-Aqlam, Alif Ba, and Al-Jumhuriya.
