= Alaa Mashzoub =

Iraqi writer and novelist (1968–2019)

Alaa Mashzoub (Arabic:علاء مشذوب; July 24, 1968 – February 2, 2019) was an Iraqi journalist, novelist, writer and historian. Many of Mashzoub's novels and writings focused on the history of Iraq, the city of Karbala, and the history of the Jews in Iraq. He was a frequent critic of sectarianism and the militias which hold sway in much of Iraq.

== Life ==
Mashzoub was born in 1968. He graduated from the University of Baghdad in 1993. He received a Master of Fine Arts in 2009 and a doctorate in fine arts in 2014, both from the University of Baghdad. He wrote for several newspapers and won the Katara Prize for Arabic Fiction.

His novels include:

- The Chaos of the Nation (2014)
- Crime on Facebook (2015)
- The Jewish Baths (Hamam al-Yahud, 2017)

He also made a documentary film, Doors and Windows.

The Jewish Baths focuses on the history of the Jews in Iraq. It is set a century earlier in Karbala during a relatively peaceful time.

== Death ==
On February 2, 2019, after criticizing Iranian interference in Iraq, Mashzoub was shot and killed while riding his bicycle in Karbala. Mashzoub, who suffered 13 bullet wounds in the attack, was 50 years old. His death was the latest in a string of murders and assassinations targeting intellectuals. According to a report by Al Jazeera, more than 500 Iraqi academics and writers were killed between 2003 and 2013 and the murder of intellectuals has become even more common since 2017.

Following Mashzoub's death, Baghdad's annual international book fair that ran 7–18 February 2019 was named after him. Iraqi President Barham Salih addressed the book fair to express his "deep regret and condemnation" of the assassination, which "obligates us, as officials and as a society, to make an extraordinary effort to uncover the perpetrators, arrest them, and to bring them to justice, and to work diligently, in security, and in intelligence, as well as politically and socially, to make this crime another motivation to uproot violence and terrorism and any threat to the life, security and dignity of the citizen." Mashzoub's death was protested in the streets of Baghdad, including in one protest organized by the Union of Iraqi Writers.
