= 2022 Iraq dust storms =

Weather events in Iraq

- Date: 2022
- Location: Iraq
- Type: dust storms
- Deaths: 1
- Injuries: 5000

In 2022, many dust storms have hit Iraq (which had already reached countries bordering Iraq). One person died and 5,000 people were admitted to hospital. Flights from Baghdad and Najaf were grounded.

Orange skies and reduced visibility has become increasingly common in the country. Iraq's meteorological office says that the weather phenomenon is expected to become increasingly common "due to drought, desertification and declining rainfall". 23 May 2022, another sandstorm affected parts of Iraq, Syria and Iran.

During the month of April of the year, Iraq recorded 7 sandstorms that ranged from severe to moderate, some of which led to a near-total disruption of life in the capital, Baghdad, and a number of areas, especially the western ones.

Experts confirmed that there are chances of dust storms rising again on the third day of Eid al-Fitr for the year 1443 AH 2022 AD, which sparked controversy and some sources stated that it had “spoiled the joy of the Iraqis.”

When the sandstorm returned on May 16, 2022, it sparked controversy for fear that it would reach Jordan. Many sources, including the Arab Weather website, stated that the sandstorm would not reach Jordan, and would not have any impact on Jordan in any way.

The poor and low-income people in Iraq are considered the most vulnerable to sandstorms. These sandstorms have generally brought the country to a standstill, and they are forced to work in bad weather conditions and state warnings against going out in search of their daily sustenance.

== Reasons ==
These storms have increased for several reasons, including climate change in Iraq, as Iraq is one of the countries most vulnerable to climate change and desertification due to increasing drought, with temperatures exceeding fifty degrees Celsius in the summer.

The lack of rainfall led to severe drought, which reduced the vegetation cover, especially in open areas, extending to countries bordering Iraq. Which requires effort with neighboring countries to combat them and reduce these problems.

It may be solved by providing a water source in dusty areas in order to grow natural plants in those areas, in addition to developing biological or nano materials that work to stabilize the soil in it.

== History of events ==
=== April ===
On April 9, 2022, these waves caused 90 cases of suffocation in Kirkuk, the death of four people, and the injury of about 30 people in Salah al-Din, according to medical statistics.

On April 16, 2022, the Iraqi Ministry of Environment confirmed its concern about the severe effects of dust storms in a number of the country's governorates, calling for ways to reduce these waves, with financial, security and water scarcity obstacles, without the possibility of expanding the vegetation cover in the country.

On April 20, 2022, several dust storms hit Baghdad and the governorates, which led to the modification of air traffic in Iraq amid expectations of continued weather fluctuations and successive dust waves in the coming days.

=== May ===
On May 16, 2022, airports and public administrations were closed, and exams were suspended in universities and schools (official working hours were suspended), due to a new dust storm hitting Iraq after a series of similar storms that occurred since April.

On May 23, 2022, dust once again covered the skies of the capital, Baghdad, in addition to other areas reaching Erbil, prompting the authorities to suspend official work in several departments and close airports. It started from Sunday night to Monday, and gradually began to disappear this evening. Markets and shops were also closed due to poor visibility, due to the dust storm that reached the country.

=== June ===
On June 4, 2022, the Iraqi Meteorological Department predicted that dust storms would hit the country in scattered areas starting today and may continue over the coming days.

On June 20, 2022, the General Authority for Meteorology and Seismic Monitoring expected that Iraq would be exposed to a dust storm from June 21, 2022 to June 23, 2022, and stated that the effect of the seasonal heat depression is expected to increase on June 21, 2022 due to the advance of moderate and dry air from a high pressure system coming from the Mediterranean Sea and the occurrence of dusty weather (dust storms) in the country.

=== July ===
On July 3, 2022, Baghdad International Airport was closed due to a sandstorm that hit Iraq. The airport administration explained in a statement that air traffic had been suspended due to weather conditions and visibility reaching 450 meters, explaining the developments related to air traffic at the airport.

== Human casualties ==
On March 4, 2022, the Karkh Health Department in Baghdad announced that the largest percentage of suffocation cases were recorded in the Al-Yarmouk Teaching Hospital, which received (550) suffocation cases, and no deaths were recorded in all hospitals.

Iraqi medical sources reported that on Thursday, May 5, 2022, Iraqi hospitals received hundreds of cases of suffocation and respiratory diseases due to the bad weather conditions and the escalation of heavy dust waves that the country is witnessing.

When another severe dust storm hit on May 16, 2022, the Iraqi Ministry of Health revealed that four thousand people in Iraq suffered from suffocation as a result of the sandstorm that hit several governorates, noting the importance of the injured receiving the necessary treatment.
