= Hamada al-Omar =

Hamada al-Omar حمادي العمر
- Village
- Location in Syria
- Coordinates: 35.0222°N 37.4417°E
- Country: Syria
- Governorate: Hama
- District: Salamiyah District
- Subdistrict: Uqayribat Subdistrict

Population (2004)
  - Total: 2,056
- Time zone: UTC+3 (AST)
- City Qrya Pcode: C3319

Hamada al-Omar (Arabic: حمادي العمر) is a Syrian village located in the Uqayribat Subdistrict of the Salamiyah District in the Hama Governorate. According to the Syria Central Bureau of Statistics (CBS), Hamada al-Omar had a population of 2,056 in the 2004 census. Its inhabitants are largely Sunni Muslims whose forebears converted from Ismaili Shia Islam.

== Syrian Civil War ==
On 20 February 2022, 3 Syrian army soldiers loyal to Bashar al-Assad were killed and another was injured after a landmine, planted by ISIL operatives, exploded near the town.
