= 2022 Sulaymaniyah gas tank explosion =

- Date: 17 November 2022
- Location: Sulaymaniyah, Iraq
- Type: explosion
- Deaths: 15
- Injuries: 12

On November 17, 2022, at 7:45 p.m. local time, an explosion in the city of Sulaymaniyah in the east of the Kurdistan Region of Iraq, destroyed three homes. Authorities attributed the explosion to a buildup of gas inside the house after the LPG liquid gas tank leaked which caused a fire in a residential area, killing and injuring dozens and destroying three houses and several vehicles. The local authorities said the explosion happened in a packed house in the Kaziwa neighborhood. They also said it resulted in the complete collapse of the property which trapped dozens under the rubble. Final death tolls were announced to be 15 deaths and a further 12 injuries. Six of the 12 injured victims were quickly admitted to Sulaymaniyah's Shar Hospital, with four undergoing emergency surgery and another placed in the intensive care unit.

== Reactions ==
The governor of Sulaymaniyah, Haval Abubakir, declared a state of mourning in the province for a period of one day for the souls of the victims of the explosion. Kurdistan Region president Nechirvan Barzani expressed his condolences in a tweet to the families of the dead and wished a speedy recovery for the injured. Kurdistan Region Interior Minister Reber Ahmed arrived at the scene to offer assistance to the victims, extend a hand of support, and express condolences on Prime Minister Masrour Barzani’s behalf. United Nations Assistance Mission for Iraq (UNAMI) described the incident as “horrific” while commending the rescuers “for their relentless efforts.” Nasser Kanaani, Spokesperson for the Ministry of Foreign Affairs of Iran, extended a condolence message to the Iraqi government and people over the incident. He also sympathized with the families of the victims and wished a speedy recovery for the injured. The Ministry of Foreign Affairs and Expatriates of Jordan said it stands in "solidarity" with the government and people of Iraq, expressing its condolences to the families of the victims and wishing a speedy recovery for the injured.
