= 2019 Mosul ferry sinking =

Multiple-fatality disaster on the Tigris

Coordinates: 36.3842°N 43.1141°E

The 2019 Mosul ferry sinking occurred on 21 March 2019, when a ferry carrying passengers on the Tigris River near Mosul capsized and sank, killing 103 people, 12 of them children. The capsize was caused by overcrowding on board the vessel, and by high water levels on the Tigris. Many of the passengers were celebrating the Kurdish New Year.

== Sinking ==
The sinking occurred on 21 March 2019 when a ferry carrying passengers sank in the Tigris river near Mosul. The vessel was carrying passengers to Umm al-Rabeein, an island upriver from the city, and was crowded with people celebrating Newroz. The ferry—which had a capacity of 50 passengers—was loaded with nearly 200 people. On the voyage upriver, the ship began to founder, eventually capsizing and sinking. Over a hundred passengers drowned, while 55 were rescued by emergency services and the Iraqi military.

== Reactions ==
Following the disaster, Mosulans began to protest against the owners of the ferry and against the local government, with much of the blame for the disaster being directed at Governor Nawfal al-Akoub. The sinking also prompted the Iraqi government to investigate allegations of corruption within the city's government. During a funeral ceremony near the site of the sinking, an angry crowd of protesters confronted Governor al-Akoub, with some protesters eventually throwing insults and bricks at the governor.

The governor's vehicle later ran over several people during his escape from the crowd, further inflaming tensions and leading to more calls to replace al-Akoub. A week later Iraqi Prime Minister Adel Abdul Mahdi requested that the Iraqi parliament remove al-Akoub as governor, which the body did on 24 March.
