= Dara al-Kabira =

Dara al-Kabira دارة الكبيرة
- Village
- Location in Syria
- Country: Syria
- Governorate: Idlib
- District: Maarrat al-Nu'man District
- Subdistrict: Kafr Nabl Nahiyah

Population (2004)
  - Total: 692
- Time zone: UTC+2 (EET)
  - Summer (DST): UTC+3 (EEST)
- City Qrya Pcode: C4057

Dara al-Kabira (Arabic: دارة الكبيرة) is a Syrian village located in Kafr Nabl Nahiyah in Maarrat al-Nu'man District, Idlib. According to the Syria Central Bureau of Statistics (CBS), Dara al-Kabira had a population of 692 in the 2004 census.

== Syrian Civil War ==
On 27 March 2022, a soldier of the Syrian Arab Army was shot and killed by opposition forces in the village, which as of March 2022, was on the frontlines between Pro-Assad and opposition forces.

As of 14 May 2025, the village is uninhabited, all of its residents having been displaced during the course of the war.
