= 2022 Kirkuk bombing =

Terrorist incident in Iraq

- Location: Kirkuk, Iraq
- Date: 18 December 2022
- Target: police officers
- Attack type: bombing
- Deaths: 10 (including a perpetrator)
- Injuries: 2

On 18 December 2022, at least nine police officers were killed when a convoy hit a roadside bomb near Kirkuk, Iraq. The bombing was followed by a gun fight. One Islamic State militant was reported killed. The incident happened near the village of Chalal al-Matar. The Islamic State (IS) have reportedly claimed that they carried out the attack on their Telegram channel. The attack comes as IS militants in recent weeks have been exploiting the volatile security situation in Kirkuk and nearby provinces.
