= 2022 Diyala massacre =

Mass murder of Iraqi soldiers

- Part of the Iraqi insurgency (2017–present)
Date	12 January 2022
Location	Al-Azim district, Diyala Governorate, Iraq
Result	Inconclusive

Belligerents
Iraq	Islamic State

Commanders and leaders
(Iraq) Zargham Luay †	unknown

Casualties and losses
11 soldiers killed	unknown

On January 21, 2022, several Islamic State gunmen raided an Iraqi Army base in rural al-Azim district, Diyala Governorate. (Note: al-Azim is nearby the city of Baqubah.) At least 11 Iraqi soldiers were killed in their sleep.

The attacks began at around 3:00 AM when the gunmen entered the barracks, proceeding to gun down sleeping soldiers before the IS terrorists left. Eleven people, ten soldiers and one lieutenant, Zargham Luay, were killed in total. Islamic State later claimed responsibility for the attack via Telegram. The Iraqi federal government immediately condemned the incident, launching a retaliatory airstrike against IS targets south of Hatra in response. Barham Salih, former prime minister of the Kurdistan Region, also condemned the ISIL terrorist attacks.

The massacre was condemned by the governments of Iraqi Kurdistan, Turkey, and the United Arab Emirates. Iraqi Kurdish president Nechirvan Barzani held a telephone call with Iraqi Prime Minister Mustafa Al-Kadhimi in which he denounced the attack and extended empathy to the people of Iraq. On January 25, 2022, the United Nations Security Council voted to condemn the killings. The UN-released document is available in three languages: English, Arabic, and Kurdish.
