= Timeline of the Syrian civil war (January–April 2019) =

The following is a timeline of the Syrian Civil War from January to April 2019. Information about aggregated casualty counts is found at Casualties of the Syrian Civil War.

== January 2019 ==
=== 1 January ===
- Rebel factions clash in Western Aleppo and Idlib for the control of Darat Izza, according to the Syrian Observatory for Human Rights (SOHR).

=== 2 January ===
- SOHR reported the death of 11 civilians, including 5 children by Coalition bombing on Deir ez-Zor.

=== 6 January ===
- Following the December announcement of withdrawal of their troops, the US imposed the security of their Kurdish-led allies as a condition for the withdrawal. Previously, Turkey had announced an offensive against the Democratic Federation of Northern Syria for the time after the withdrawal.

=== 8 January ===
- Russian military units begin patrolling areas in and around the vicinity of Manbij, including Arima, according to pro-Russian Al-Masdar News.

=== 11 January ===
- The CJTF-OIR anti-ISIL Coalition confirms the withdrawal process of US troops from Syria has officially began.

=== 12–13 January ===
- Journalist Mohammed Hassan posted pictures on Twitter of a joint base of operations in Arima shared by the Russians, the Syrian government, and the Manbij Military Council. Reports and images of Russian Military Police conducting joint patrols with the Manbij Military Council in what the Russians called “the security zone around Manbij" also surfaced. Russian military police spokesman Yusup Mamatov said “The task is to ensure security in the area of responsibility (and) to monitor the situation and movements of armed formations.”

=== 15 January ===
- In the city of Manbij, a suicide attack claimed by ISIL leaves at least 19 casualties. Among them, four U.S. soldiers are reported dead and three wounded.
- Syrian Democratic Forces (SDF) fully capture al-Susah from ISIL.

=== 17 January ===
- Citing the recent attack on American soldiers in Manbij, French President Emmanuel Macron states that ISIL is not yet defeated and reaffirms his commitment to keep French soldiers in Syria throughout 2019 despite US withdrawal.

=== 18 January ===
- A massive explosion targeting a Tahrir al-Sham headquarters in Idlib kills 15 people and wounds 20 others. A car bomb is reported to have been used in the attack, according to Al-Masdar.

=== 20 January ===
- Israel launches a wave of cruise missile and guided bomb attacks against what it considered to be Hezbollah and Iranian sites in Syria after an alleged Iranian rocket was intercepted over the Golan Heights. 11 people were killed in the pre-dawn strikes, with Russia claiming 4 of those were Syrian troops. The strikes also caused significant infrastructural damage to Damascus International Airport.
- An explosives-laden vehicle detonated near a Military Intelligence Directorate office in Al-Mutahelek al-Junoubi neighborhood, Damascus. An attacker were arrested and the bombing no left wounded. In the same day a bomb blast in Afrin kill 3 people and wounding 9 more. Th attack is on the first anniversary of the start of a military operation by Turkey and allied rebels in the Kurdish-majority region.

=== 21 January ===
- An ISIL suicide car bomb targets a US convoy accompanied by SDF troops on the Shadadi-Al-Hasakah road in Al-Hasakah province, killing five SDF personnel. Witnesses said the SVBIED rammed into an SDF vehicle by a checkpoint held by Kurdish forces a dozen kilometers outside Shadadi as the US convoy drove past. No Americans were harmed.

=== 22 January ===
- Syrian Democratic Forces secure Mozan and capture most of as-Safafinah from the Islamic State in the Middle Euphrates River Valley. ISIL's territorial control in Eastern Syria is reduced to two villages - al-Marashidah and al-Shajlah.

=== 23 January ===
- After an ISIL counterattack, the Syrian Democratic Forces storm the ISIL-held towns of Al-Baghuz Fawqani and al-Shajlah. Heavy clashes are reported from inside al-Baghuz. Shajlah and Baghuz Fawqani were later reported to be fully liberated.

=== 24 January ===
- The US imposes sanctions on Liwa Fatemiyoun and Liwa Zainebiyoun for providing material support to Iran's Quds Force.
- In Moscow, Russian President Vladimir Putin and Turkish President Tayyip Erdogan reaffirm they are "actively collaborating" in Syria and both jointly support the idea of a safe zone in northern Syria.

=== 29 January ===
- France becomes the first European country to take back citizens arrested on suspicion of links to the Islamic State, with 130 ISIL suspects held in SDF custody expected to be repatriated to France within upcoming weeks. Only the US, Lebanon, Russia, Indonesia and Sudan, had so far agreed to repatriate their nationals. Among the suspects are members of the infamous "Artigat Network" that masterminded several attacks in France, including an attack in Nice which killed 87 people.

=== 31 January ===
- An American court found the Bashar al-Assad government liable for the extrajudicial killing of the Sunday Times war correspondent Marie Colvin and ordered the Syrians to pay $300 million (£228 million) in punitive damages.

== February 2019 ==
=== 2 February ===
- A five-story building in the war-torn Salaheddine District of Aleppo collapses, killing 11 people with only one person rescued alive. The neighborhood was a hotly contested rebel front line during the Battle of Aleppo.
- ISIL sends messages via smugglers requesting safe passage to Turkey from Kurdish forces. The deal is rejected.

=== 7 February ===
- The Rukban refugee camp along the Jordan–Syria border receives its first shipment of aid in three months with 118 trucks from the United Nations and Syrian Arab Red Crescent reaching the camp with supplies for its 40,000-45,000 residents.

=== 9 February ===
- The Syrian Democratic Forces launch their final assault on the remaining ISIL enclave in the Middle Euphrates River Valley (MERV).
- Armenia sends a team of 83 de-mining experts, medical personnel and security officers to defuse mines and provide medical help to residents of Aleppo. Russia provides transport and logistical assistance for the mission.

=== 11 February ===
- After a meeting of their respective defense ministers in Ankara, Russia and Turkey announced their joint intentions to seek "decisive" measures to stabilize the situation in Syria's Idlib province. The released joint statement did not specify what the measures were or when they might happen.

=== 16 February ===
- UK Foreign Secretary Jeremy Hunt stated that Syria had no "future" under Bashar Al-Assad but was "stuck" with him due to Russian support.
- SOHR reported that at least 18 people were killed and many more injured after sporadic Syrian government shelling on Maarrat al-Nu'man, Khan Shaykhun, Hama and surrounding settlements in the rebel-held Idlib region within the past two days. Rebels responded with machine gun and rocket fire towards SAA positions.

=== 18 February ===
- Two explosions kill over 25, and wounds 20 in Idlib.

=== 21 February ===
- The United States' allies France and the United Kingdom say they won't keep their troops in Syria after the United States pulls out.
- The White House announces 200 U.S. troops would remain in Syria as a "peacekeeping" force post-withdrawal. The announcement came after the U.S. and Turkish presidents spoke earlier in the day. The number was later raised to 400.

=== 23 February ===
- Turkish President Erdogan asserts that any potential "safe zone" established along the Turkish border must be under Turkish control.

=== 25 February ===
- Syrian President Bashar al-Assad meets with Iranian Supreme Leader Ali Khamenei, President Hassan Rouhani, and Major General Qasem Soleimani in Tehran. It's Assad's first public visit to Tehran since 2010, before the civil war.

=== 28 February ===
- Syrian Democratic Forces discover a mass grave in Baghuz Fawqani containing dozens of decapitated bodies, mainly of Yazidi people.

== March 2019 ==
=== 7 March ===
- Human rights legal teams submitted cases to the International Criminal Court alleging possible war crimes and crimes against humanity by the Assad government. The lawsuits were submitted on behalf of 28 Syrian refugees in Jordan who say they were forced to flee the country.

=== 13 March ===
- In the most extensive and heaviest bombardment in weeks, Syrian and Russian warplanes pounded the rebel-held enclave in the Idlib-Hama-east Latakia region, deemed a "de-escalation zone" since the 2018 demilitarization agreement. Russia confirmed they, in coordination with Turkey, targeted Hayat Tahrir al-Sham drones and weapons stockpiles. Among dozens of rocket strikes, usage of incendiary and cluster munitions were reported as well. The Syrian army has escalated its shelling of the rebel enclave since February 2019, causing civilians to depopulate rebel-held towns in the buffer zone. The attacks have killed dozens of civilians and injured hundreds, and led to tens of thousands of people fleeing front line areas to camps and towns closer to the Turkish border, rescuers and aid agencies have said. The army have denied the deliberate targeting of civilians.

=== 14 March ===
- The Syrian Democratic Forces (SDF) declares progress after the ISIL camp on the outskirts of Baghuz is captured.

=== 19 March ===
- SDF and Kurdish fighters report "significant progress" in the fight against ISIL in Baghuz; the town itself is fully liberated with a few small pockets remaining along the Euphrates river.

=== 20 March ===
- The SDF report that the remaining ISIL fighters in Baghuz are operating in tunnels along the Euphrates.

=== 21 March ===
- US President Donald Trump announces his intentions to recognize Israeli sovereignty over the disputed Golan Heights, a move welcomed by Israel.

=== 23 March ===
- The Syrian Democratic Forces capture the last territory held by the Islamic State, ending their territorial control in Syria.

=== 25 March ===
- President Donald Trump officially signs a declaration of the US's recognition of Israel's claim to the Golan Heights region during a visit by Israeli Prime Minister Benjamin Netanyahu to the United States.

=== 28 March ===
- At least 7 people are killed in Aleppo following air strikes in the region; Syria blames Israel for the assault.

== April 2019 ==
=== 1 April ===
- Media sources report ISIL leader Abu Bakr al-Baghdadi is believed to be hiding in tunnels under the Iraq-Syria border.

=== 7 April ===
- At least 15 people are killed by continued shelling between government and rebel forces in the Idlib-Hama region, further straining the formal truce brokered in 2018.

=== 12 April ===
- At least two children are reportedly killed and five others injured after tampering with a land mine in Aleppo.

=== 13 April ===
- Syria says Israel launched airstrikes at a military research facility near Masyaf known as the "Accounting School", along with targeting a missile development center in a village near Masyaf, and a nearby military base run by Iran-backed fighters. The strikes injured at least 6 soldiers. The SOHR reports that 17 were wounded and deaths occurred, but no number was given. Reportedly a nearby S-300 missile system battery did not fire anything at all against the attack.

=== 20 April ===
- SOHR reports that, in the deadliest attacks on pro-government forces in weeks, jihadist cells have killed almost 50 pro-government fighters across Syria within the previous 48 hours. ISIL claims responsibility for the collective assaults.
- Kosovo repatriates 110 of its citizens from Syria, including 72 children, 32 women, and four men suspected of fighting for ISIL. The men were arrested upon arrival back into the country.

=== 23 April ===
- Major protests erupt in the cities of Al-Busayrah and Shuhail in the eastern part of the Deir ez-Zor Governorate in opposition to SDF and Kurdish administration.

=== 28 April ===
- The Martyr Akram Ali Ibrahim Al-Ahmad school in Qalaat al-Madiq was bombed by government forces.

=== 29 April ===
- ISIL leader Abu Bakr al-Baghdadi makes his first appearance on video since 2014; in the 40 second video, al-Baghdadi speaks about the Battle of Baghuz and praises the Sri Lanka Easter bombings.

=== 30 April ===
- After weeks of intensified bombardment, the SAA launches an offensive into the rebel-controlled Idlib-Hama region.
