= Deir ez-Zor campaign (2017–2019) =

Part of the Syrian Civil War (2017–2019)

- Part of the Deir ez-Zor Governorate campaign, the Rojava–Islamist conflict, and the American-led intervention in the Syrian Civil War
- The situation in Deir ez-Zor, as of 23 March 2019 Syrian Democratic Forces control Syrian Government control Islamic State control
| Date | First phase: 8 September 2017 – 5 March 2018 (5 months, 3 weeks and 4 days); Second phase: 1 May – 4 August 2018 (3 months and 3 days); Third phase: 10 September 2018 – 23 March 2019 (6 months, 1 week and 6 days) |
| Location | Eastern Syria: Southern Al-Hasakah Governorate; Eastern Deir ez-Zor Governorate |
| Result | SDF and allied victory; The SDF captures 14,020 square kilometers of territory (containing at least 50,000 civilians); In Spring 2018, the SDF pauses the campaign without fully clearing ISIL from eastern Syria, for a couple of months, due to a Turkish assault on YPG-held Afrin; The SDF expels ISIL from the Iraqi–Syrian border region on 4 August 2018; The SDF captures Hajin, the last major stronghold, from ISIL on 14 December 2018; The SDF captures ISIL's last stronghold, Baghuz Fawqani, on 13 February 2019, with the exception of an ISIL camp south of the town; The SDF fully defeats ISIL on 23 March, ending ISIL territorial control east of the Euphrates River |

Belligerents
| Syrian Democratic Forces; Federal Security Forces; International Freedom Battalion; CJTF–OIR; United States; United Kingdom; France; Netherlands; Russia; Iraq (2018) | Islamic State; Wilayat al-Sham; al-Barakah district; Al-Khayr district; Al-Furat district |

Commanders and leaders
| Ahmad Abu Khawla (Deir ez-Zor Military Council commander); Yasser al-Dahla (Deir ez-Zor Military Council, Gathering of Baggara Youth commander); Rojda Kobanê (YPJ commander); Rojda Felat (YPJ commander); Ammar al-Salloum † (Senior commander); Agid Ahmed (Manbij Military Council commander); Abjer Abjer (MFS commander); Robert Ichou (Nattoreh commander); Haider al-Abadi | (Islamic State) Abu Bakr al-Baghdadi (Leader of ISIL) (Islamic State) Mohammed Mahmoud al-Abadi † (High-ranking commander) (Islamic State) Mohammed Obeid al-Muhsin "Abu Kharja" (surrendered) (Regional senior commander) (Islamic State) Saddam Omar Hussein al-Jamal (POW) (Islamic State) Essam Abdel Qader al-Zobei (POW) (Senior commander) (Islamic State) Omar Shebab al-Karbouly (POW) (Senior commander) (Islamic State) Mohammed Hussein al-Qadeer (POW) (Senior commander) (Islamic State) Saleh Khalaf al-Ali (POW) (Regional commander) (Islamic State) Hisen Ayid el-Bilebil Ebu el-Walid † (Islamic State) Shaykh Abu Anas al-Furati † (Islamic State) Abu Adham al-Shami † (Islamic State) Abothan al-Jazihad † (Islamic State) Abd al-Rahman Filipini † (Islamic State) Abd al Rahman al-Tamimi † (Islamic State) Aysh al-Dagestani † (Brigade commander) (Islamic State) Abu Khattab al-Iraqi † (Leader of ISIL's oil and gas network) |

Units involved
| Syrian Democratic Forces; Deir ez-Zor Military Council; Gathering of al-Baggara Youth; Khabat al-Sha'iti Battalion; Hajin battalion; People's Protection Units (YPG); YPG International; Women's Protection Units (YPJ); Anti-Terror Units; Al-Sanadid Forces; Manbij Military Council; Manbij Revolutionaries Battalion; Martyr Abdo Dushka Regiment; Army of Revolutionaries; Kurdish Front; Northern Democratic Brigade; Syriac Military Council (MFS); Special Forces unit; Nattoreh; Federal Security Forces; Self Defence Forces; Asayish; International Freedom Battalion; TKP/ML TİKKO; (Iraq) Iraqi security forces; Popular Mobilization Forces; United States Armed Forces; United States Air Force; United States special operations forces; United States Army (support role per local reports); (United Kingdom) British Armed Forces; SAS (unconfirmed by authorities); (France) French Armed Forces; French SOF; Task Force Wagram (heavy artillery) | (Islamic State) Military of ISIL |

Strength
| ≈17,000 | 6,000–10,000 |

Casualties and losses
| 162 killed, 416 wounded (2017; per the SDF); 201 killed (2018; per the SDF); 256 killed (2019; per the SDF); 753 killed, 35 captured (10 Sep.–23 March 2019; per the SOHR) | 1,345 killed, 4,000 wounded, 64 captured (2017; per the SDF); 298 killed (Jan. 2018; per the SDF); 1,618 killed, 9,250 captured (10 Sep. 2018–23 March 2019; per the SOHR) |
- 698 civilians killed (10 Sep.–23 March 2019), 720+ alleged defectors and prisoners executed by ISIL, including Yazidi captives

The Deir ez-Zor campaign, codenamed the al-Jazeera Storm campaign, was a military operation launched by the Syrian Democratic Forces (SDF) against the Islamic State (IS) in Syria's Deir ez-Zor Governorate in 2017 during the Syrian Civil War with the goal of capturing territory in eastern Syria, particularly east and north of the Euphrates river. The U.S.-led Combined Joint Task Force – Operation Inherent Resolve (CJTF–OIR) anti-ISIL coalition provided extensive air support while SDF personnel composed the majority of the ground forces; OIR special forces and artillery units were also involved in the campaign.

The ground campaign stalled and was paused in early 2018 due to the Turkish military operation in Afrin, but resumed on 1 May 2018 with the new phase named by the coalition as Operation Roundup. The third phase began on 10 September 2018 but was halted due to Turkish artillery attacks on SDF positions near the Syria-Turkey border on 31 October. The SDF and the coalition announced the resumption of the offensive on 11 November. After a series of steady successes following the capture of ISIL's Hajin stronghold, and a ten-day pause for civilian evacuations, the SDF launched its final assault on ISIL's final pocket of territory on 9 February 2019 and declared victory on 23 March, concluding the campaign.

The first phase of the campaign was concurrent with another SDF operation, the Raqqa campaign conducted against Raqqa, the Islamic State's then-capital city and main stronghold in Syria, as well as the Central Syria campaign, the Eastern Syria campaign, the Syrian Desert campaign, and the Deir ez-Zor offensive, in which Assad's Syrian Arab Army (SAA) was also capturing territory from the Islamic State; the Iraqi Army's Western Iraq campaign against ISIL was also underway.

== Prelude ==
On 25 August 2017, around 800 fighters from the Syrian Elite Forces defected to the SDF's Deir ez-Zor Military Council. On the same day, Ahmad Abu Khawla, commander of the Deir ez-Zor Military Council, announced that it would launch an offensive north of Deir ez-Zor within several weeks. Just before the start of the offensive, the SDF received a large amount of new weaponry and ammunition from the U.S.-led CJTF–OIR Coalition.

== The campaign ==
=== Initial phase ===
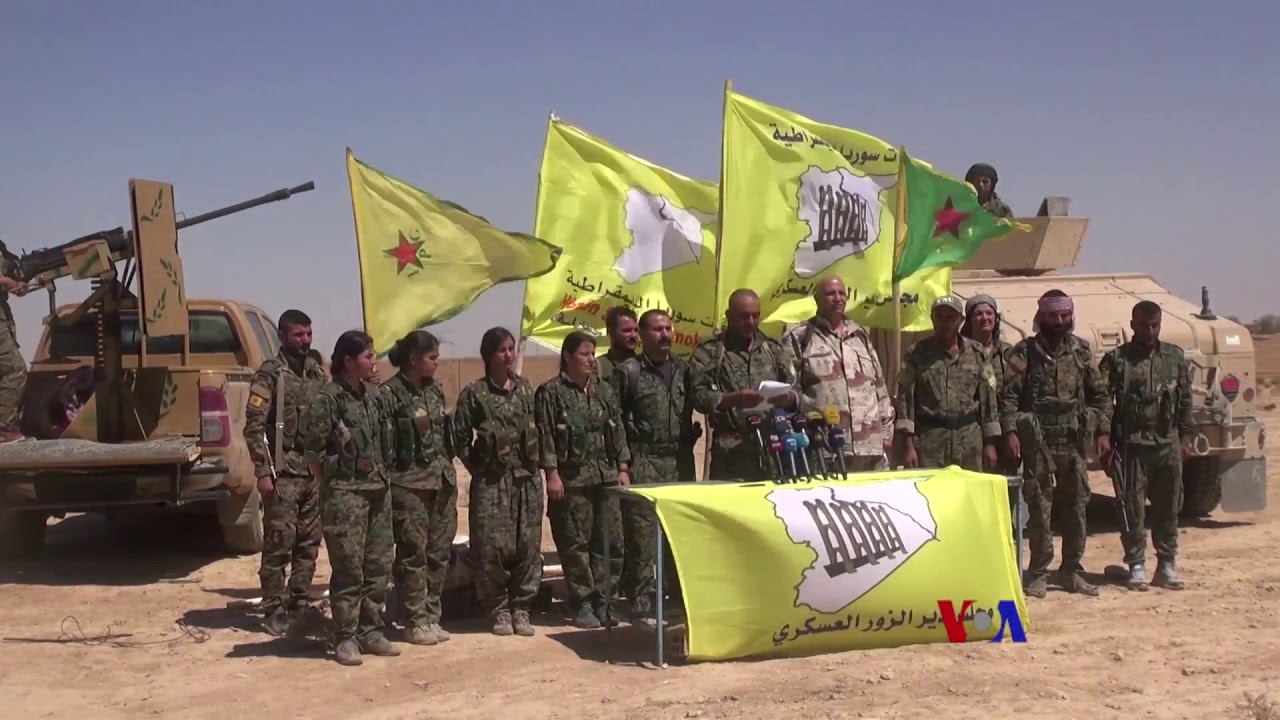
The SDF officially announcing the campaign, 9 September 2017

The SDF launched their ground operation on 8 September 2017 by attacking ISIL-held villages in the northern Deir ez-Zor countryside; on the next day, the campaign was officially announced in the al-Shaddadah Subdistrict, with the stated aim of expelling ISIL from all areas north and east of the Euphrates river. During the course of the next two days, the SDF rapidly advanced and captured numerous villages. According to pro-Syrian opposition media, this quick initial progress was due to ISIL forces retreating from areas that were difficult to defend in the face of heavy CJTF–OIR coalition airstrikes.

On 10 September 2017, the SDF fought its way into the fortified 'Industrial City', directly north of Deir ez-Zor city, while capturing more nearby villages. On 12 and 13 September, the SDF captured several locations at Deir ez-Zor's northern entrance (including the former Brigade 113 and al-Niran Battalion bases, the Sadkob station and part of the sheep market) as well as the silos and cotton storages in the Industrial City. Anti-ISIL forces also made further progress in the desert north of Deir ez-Zor, where it advanced 60 km. Despite these successes for the SDF, ISIL began offering stiffer resistance and began launching repeated counterattacks supported by VBIEDs in an attempt to stall the offensive and/or recapture territory.

Meanwhile, the SDF leadership stated that their forces would not attack Syrian government troops, which were simultaneously battling ISIL on the west side of the Euphrates. However, on 15 September, Ahmad Abu Khawla stated that the SDF would not allow Syrian government forces to cross the Euphrates. The next day, reportedly Syrian or Russian aircraft bombed SDF positions on the eastern bank of the Euphrates, injuring six SDF fighters. In response, CJTF–OIR stated that while they were putting their "full efforts into preventing unnecessary escalation among forces that share ISIS as our common enemy", "Coalition forces and partners always retain the right of self-defense". In this context, Institute for the Study of War expert Chris Kozak said that neither Russia nor the United States had an interest in escalating a conflict between themselves. "The real threat [is instead] that the partner forces on the ground – the SAA and the SDF – come close [to confrontation] before the US and Russia can slow them down." The Syrian government and the SDF were rivals in the Deir ez-Zor Governorate, as both sides wanted to capture the region's natural resources (most importantly its oil fields). On 17 September, the SDF captured a textile factory and a roundabout 7 km from Deir ez-Zor city.

==== Opening of a second front ====
On 20 September, the SDF opened a second front against ISIL east of Deir ez-Zor, near the border with Iraq, and seized six villages alongside the M7 highway in quick order, advancing towards the oil-rich eastern countryside of Deir ez-Zor. On 21 September, Russia warned it would attack SDF fighters if provoked.

As a response to the SDF advances, ISIL began to launch raids into SDF-held areas in southern al-Hasakah Governorate, reportedly ambushing and killing several SDF fighters on 21 and 24 September. ISIL counterattacks did little to impede the SDF offensive, however, with the SDF proceeding to capture the Al-Izba and Conoco gas fields, the Derro oil fields, and the Al-Bazikh mountain chain.

On 25 September, Russian aircraft, as well as Syrian and Russian artillery, bombarded SDF troops at the Conoco gas field, causing several casualties. The SDF responded by stating that "Russian and regime forces have mounted a treacherous attack against our forces," and that they would "use [our] legitimate right to self-defense". Further Russian bombing was reported on 27 September, with the SOHR stating 6 civilian casualties in Marat, to the east of the Euphrates River, opposite the Deir ez-Zor Military Airbase. Iranian missile strikes on ISIL in the southern and eastern parts of the province were also reported on 24 September.

Despite the Russo-Syrian airstrike incidents, the SDF continued the offensive and pushed ISIL out of numerous villages over the following days. At al-Suwar, however, the SDF troops met fierce resistance on 24 September, and a heavy battle ensued; after six days of fighting the town finally fell. The SDF then attempted to further advance in al-Suwar's surroundings, while ISIL launched counterattacks to retake it.

Meanwhile, on 28 September, Yasser al-Dahla of The Gathering of al-Baggara Youth group was arrested by SDF military police on accusations of not effectively participating in the offensive and a "lack of military discipline". The Gathering of al-Baggara Youth denied these charges, and criticized the Deir ez-Zor Military Council of denying Euphrates Shield fighters who defected to the SDF to join the Gathering. Dahla reportedly threatened to cease his group's participation in the Deir ez-Zor offensive.

On 30 September, the SDF took control of the Jafra oil fields, which was one of the "most important sources of income for IS". Between 1 and 9 October, the SDF captured several more villages and repelled further ISIL counterattacks, with ISIL resistance in these areas being mostly light. This was due to ISIL relocating many of its fighters from its frontlines with the SDF in order to face the encroaching Syrian Army.

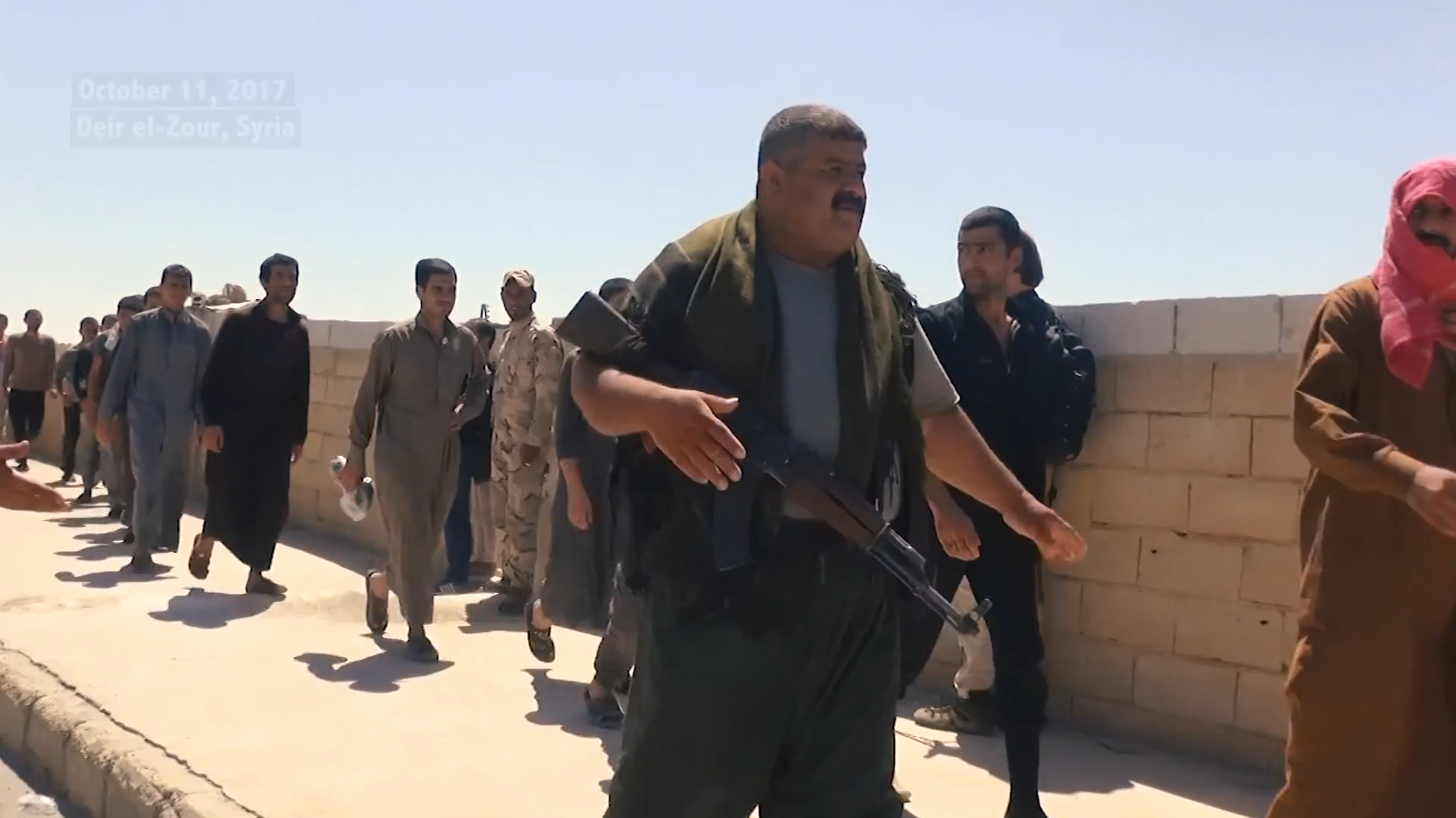
ISIL prisoners of war in the custody of the SDF after surrendering during the campaign in October 2017.

Between 9 and 10 October, the SDF captured four villages while advancing on the Euphrates river's eastern bank. Around a dozen SDF fighters were executed after ISIL recaptured al-Jazrah oilfield on 12 October. Many SDF fighters were killed and executed on 15 October after ISIL attacked their positions on the provincial border between al-Hasakah and Deir ez-Zor, infiltrating several checkpoints and outposts along the main road between Al-Salhiyah and Sor. Syrian military reports said on 19 October that the SDF had allowed Russian troops to enter and take control of Conoco gas field, despite both the SDF and the SAA trying to take control of al-Omar oil field from ISIL. Laila al-Abdullah, the spokesperson of the SDF, announced that they had captured the al-Omar oil field after a military operation in early hours of 22 October, and were clashing with ISIL fighters in an adjacent housing complex. SOHR stated that it had entered the oilfield after pro-Syrian government forces withdrew following an ISIL attack on them.

The SDF, later in the month, started advancing towards Abu Kamal and reportedly captured sites south of the oilfields. ISIL counterattacked on 29 October in an attempt to recapture the oilfield and was able to capture large territory along its perimeter while killing 6 SDF fighters. By November 2017, the SDF had reached the western outskirts of Markadah.

On 3 November, the SDF captured six villages while advancing on three different fronts. One village on the eastern bank of the Euphrates was captured near the Al-Busayrah axis, about 30 kilometres (19 mi) southeast of Deir ez-Zor city. Two villages around 70 kilometres (43 mi) northeast from the city and located near the border with Iraq were also captured. In addition, three villages 50 kilometres (31 mi) east of Deir ez-Zor city and located on the bank of the Khabur river were captured by the SDF. On 6 November, the SDF cleared an ISIL pocket at Khabur after two SDF pincers met on both sides of the river and captured six villages, about 35 kilometres (22 mi) east of Deir ez-Zor city.

==== Slowing down of the campaign ====
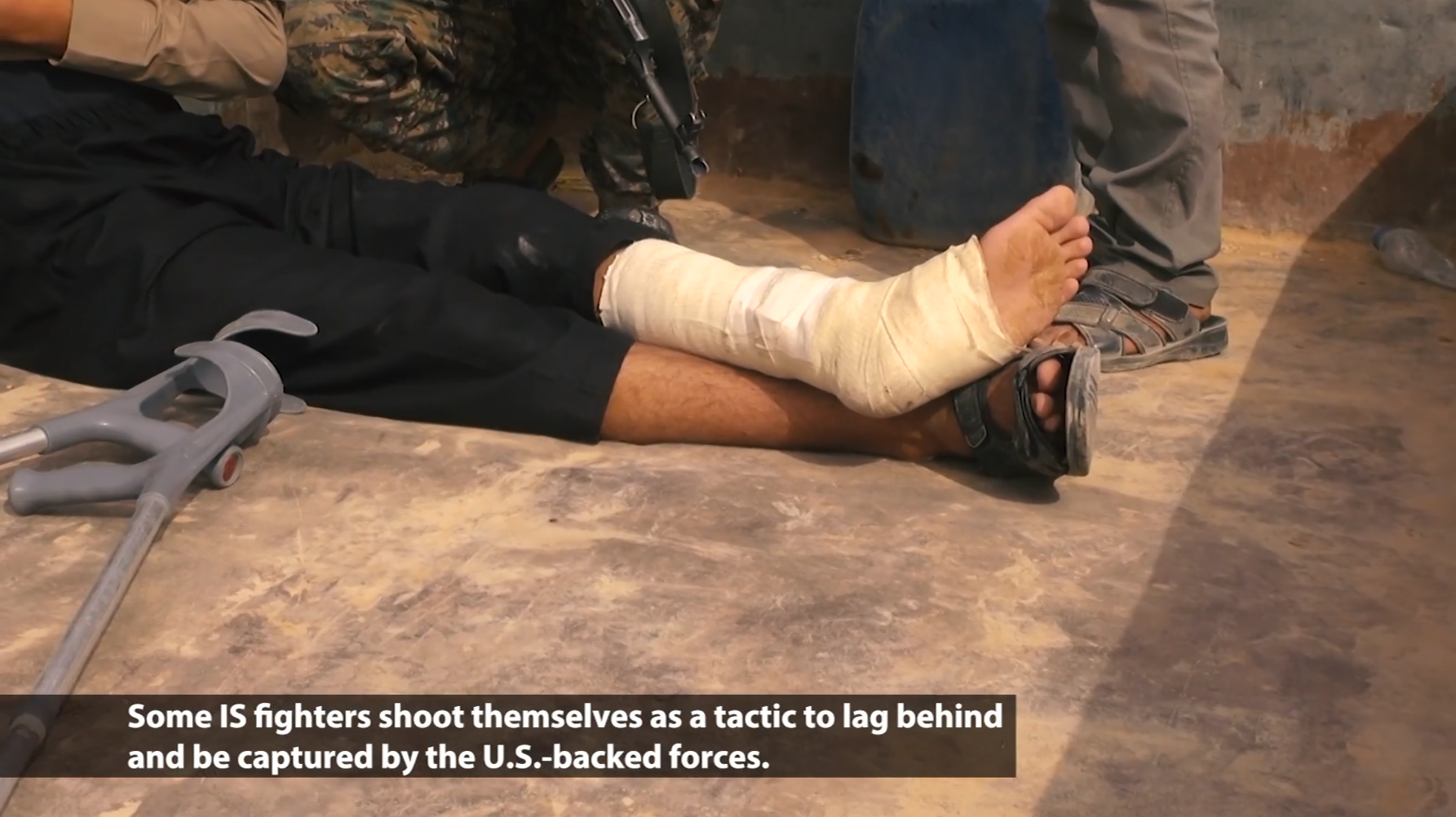
An ISIL POW with a self-inflicted wound. As the organization's combatants continued to retreat in eastern Syria, an increasing number of its fighters shot themselves in order to lag behind and be captured by the SDF.

On 7 November, the SDF captured a village while advancing on the southwest along Khabur. The SDF captured the key town of Markadah on 8 November. On 12 November, the SDF captured al-Busayrah and all neighboring villages, thereby eliminating an ISIL pocket to the east of the Euphrates. The SDF captured the al-Tanak oil fields on the next day. On 14 November, the SDF pushed southwards along the river, capturing a village and killing 11 ISIL militants. By the next day, they had advanced within 15 kilometres (9.3 mi) to the border with Iraq, according to the Syrian Observatory for Human Rights (SOHR). After ISIL lost Al-Qa'im and Abu Kamal to the Iraqi and Syrian Army, respectively, ISIL moved its de facto capital to the Syrian city of Hajin, in the Middle Euphrates Valley.

SDF forces, spearheaded by the Deir Ez-Zor Military Council, reached the Iraqi border on 25 November, through the northern countryside of Abu Kamal, effectively blocking the Syrian Army from the border crossings located north of the town. The United States Department of Defense (U.S. DoD) later announced in February 2018 that Shaykh Abu Anas al-Furati, a senior ISIL commander, was killed in an airstrike on Hajin on 27 November 2017. On 3 December 2017, the YPG declared that it had completely captured the eastern countryside of Deir Ez-Zor. The SDF captured three villages 70 kilometres (43 mi) south of Deir Ez-Zor city on 9 December. During the clashes, the SDF was struck by a car bomb in a village, with Amaq News Agency reporting the deaths of 15 SDF fighters. Around this time it was reported that Russian airstrikes had helped Kurdish forces in their ground advances.

The Deir Ez-Zor Military Council reported on 12 December that their forces had captured several towns along the eastern bank of the Euphrates, including Hasiyat, Jayshiyah, Jadleh, al-Bahrah, and Gharanij after a brief battle. During the week, taking advantage of ISIL's focus on attacking the Syrian Army on the western bank, the SDF captured several towns controlled by the group. The SDF's official media wing reported the capture of Jurdi al-Sharqi on 13 December after a brief battle. SOHR, meanwhile, stated that 23 civilians had been killed by airstrikes carried out by the U.S.-led Coalition in an ISIL-controlled village on the eastern banks. The U.S. DoD would later announce in February 2018 that ISIL military commander Abd al Rahman Filipini was killed near Hajin due to airstrikes on 13–14 December 2017.

On 16 December, the Deir Ez-Zor Military Council captured several sites, including the towns of Abu Hardub and Hasiyat. This allowed them to secure complete control over the Murad Oil Field, located northeast of Abu Hardub, thus leaving the remaining populated areas to secure from ISIL east of the Euphrates, stretching from Hajin down towards the border with Iraq, within the administrative district of Abu Kamal. ISIL counterattacked SDF positions along the Euphrates on 22 December, attempting to push back towards Al-Omar oil fields. Pro-SDF media reported the attack was foiled and that 21 ISIL fighters were killed. ISIL-affiliated media reported on 29 December that they had struck an SDF position with a VBIED attack amidst a counterattack near al-Bahrah village. The outlet stated that at least 3 SDF fighters were killed and 7 wounded in the battle.

Later on 29 December, according to both pro-Syrian opposition and pro-Kurdish sources, the SDF captured four towns and villages (Al-Bahrah, Al-Kahawi, Al-Jabal and Kushkiyah) north of Hajin. The advance bypassed the Shaitat tribal region, encircling ISIL in the area. The SDF stated it had killed 67 ISIL fighters while capturing the villages. The next day, SOHR reported heavy fighting between both groups on the eastern banks with ISIL managing to capture Abu Hamam. Later on the same day, the SDF captured the town of Khara'ij and the village of al-Marsama Gharbi. It also recaptured Abu Hamam.

ISIL stated on 31 December that 20 SDF fighters and 50 others at al-Bahra had been wounded in a car bombing attack carried out by a German jihadist. On 1 January 2018, it was announced that the YPG/YPJ's Anti-Terror Units had killed ISIL commander Hisen Ayid el-Bilebil Ebu el-Walid, the mastermind of the July 2016 Qamishli bombings, in al-Busayrah. SOHR stated on the same day that 12 civilians were killed in air strikes on the ISIL-held village of Susa. Meanwhile, Kurdish sources stated that the SDF had captured the town of al-Sabha.

==== Gharanij and ISIL attacks ====
Pro-Kurdish and pro-coalition sources reported on 2 January 2018 that the SDF had captured the towns of Abu Hardub and al-Nabayi, killing at least 17 ISIL fighters. The U.S. DoD would later announce in February that ISIL military commander Abd al Rahman al Tamimi was killed in airstrikes near Hajin on 2 January. On the next day, the SDF announced the capture of the towns of Muhamidah, 'Ard Al-Zir and Al-Majeed. They were also engaged in heavy clashes for control of Abu Hamam and Hajin. On 4 January, it was reported that they had captured the ISIL stronghold of Gharanij. The U.S. DoD would later announce in February that Haytham al Jazairi and Hassan al Jazzari, part of ISIL's immigration logistics group, were killed in airstrikes on 6 January near Khara'ij and Abu Hammam respectively.

An ISIL counterattack on 7 January on al-Bahra failed. ISIL official media stated it had recaptured Gharanij on 9 January in addition to killing 20 SDF fighters. SOHR reported on 10 January that SDF had released more than 400 Syrian ISIL members in Deir Ez-Zor. It added that out of the 400, 120 former ISIL fighters had joined the SDF. However, the U.S.-led coalition would later deny on 15 January the allegations that the SDF had recruited former ISIL fighters.

ISIL-affiliated media stated that an Uzbek suicide bomber killed or injured 20 SDF fighters during the night on 10 January. The U.S. DoD would later announce in February that ISIL brigade commander Aysh al Dagestani was killed in an airstrike near Kashmah on 12 January. ISIL captured Gharanij for the third time in three weeks from the SDF following a counter-attack on 13 January. Meanwhile, pro-Kurdish and coalition sources stated 100 ISIL fighters had been killed during the overall battle for the town, while ISIL stated 50-70 SDF fighters had been killed in the battle. On 16 January, a VBIED attack in Gharanij forced the SDF to retreat from some positions in the town, though retaining control of half of it. Pro-ISIL Wafa Media announced on 18 January that an airstrike had killed former German rapper Denis Cuspert during a battle in Gharanij. Cuspert was a fighter, recruiter and propagandist for ISIL. The outlet released reported images of his corpse, stating that he died on 17 January. The coalition later stated that 145-150 militants were killed in U.S. airstrikes on an ISIL headquarters near al-Shaafah on the same day.

==== Entering the Middle Euphrates Valley ====
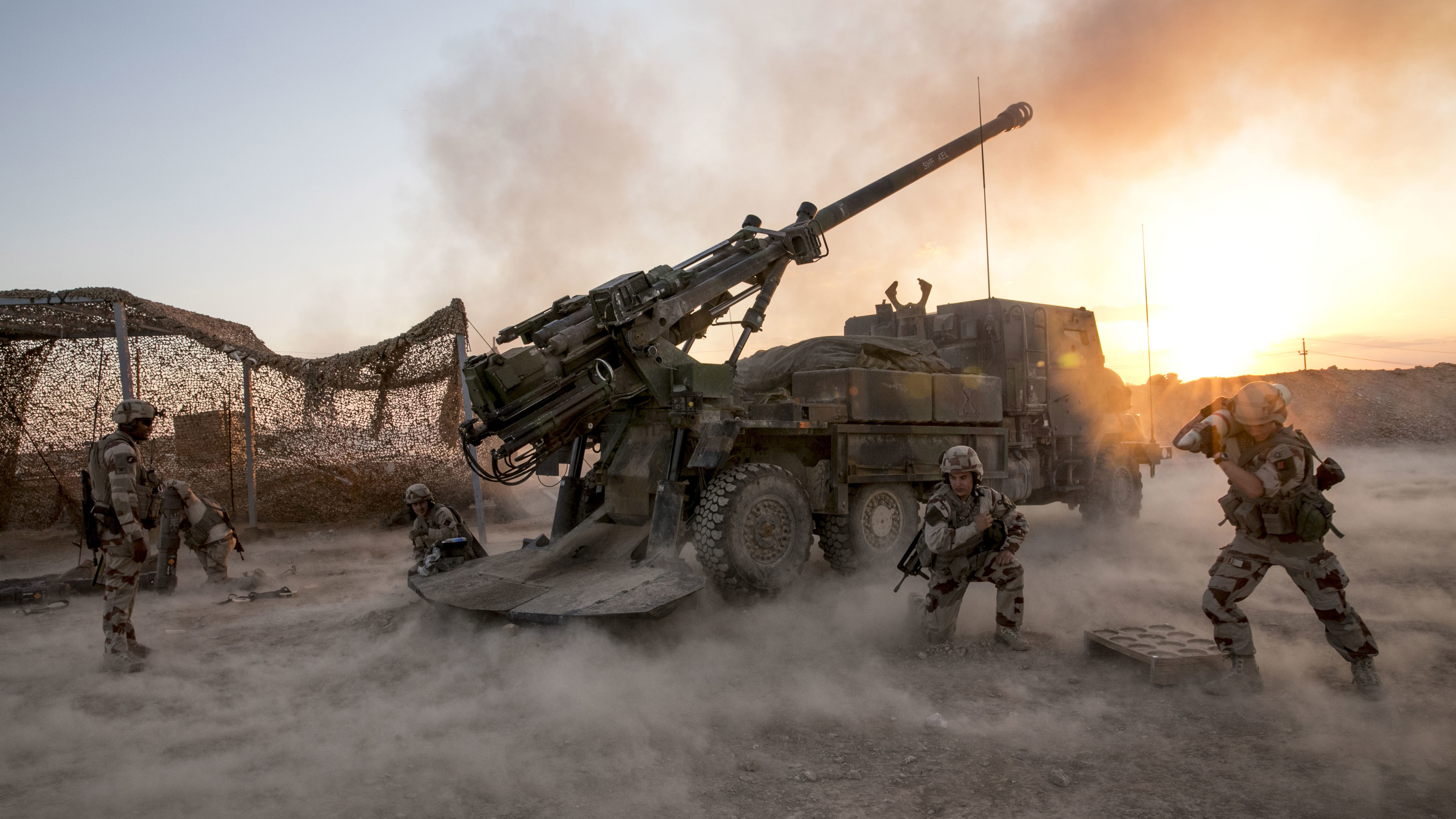
French CAESAR artillery fires at ISIL positions during the campaign

The capture of Alexanda Kotey and El Shafee Elsheikh, members of ISIL's cell called "The Beatles", was reported in February. The two had been caught a month earlier near Deir ez-Zor, in the Euphrates Valley.

After capturing Gharanij, the SDF in February 2018 shifted their attention to securing complete control of al-Bahrah, the control of which had changed twice. ISIL attacked SDF positions in al-Bahrah twice with VBIEDs on 10 February, resulting in dozens of dead and wounded in their ranks. Amaq stated on 11 February that the SDF had been accidentally bombed by the coalition during clashes with ISIL in al-Susa area near the Iraqi border.

According to a source in the Iraqi Popular Mobilisation Units (PMU) on 12 February, their forces had rescued 11 SDF fighters encircled by ISIL near the Iraqi-Syrian border. The SDF announced on 18 February that Sjoerd Heeger, a Dutch member of theirs, was killed fighting ISIL on 12 February. Syria's state-run news agency SANA reported that U.S. airstrikes killed 16 people in al-Bahrah on 19 February and 12 in Hajin on 21 February. SOHR stated that U.S. airstrikes on al-Shaafah on 26 February killed 25 civilians.

The Pentagon acknowledged on 5 March that the Turkish military operation in Afrin had led to an "operational pause" in the Deir ez-Zor offensive. Coalition spokesman Major Adrian Rankine-Galloway stated that they had seen SDF fighters leave the offensive in Middle Euphrates Valley to fight elsewhere. On 6 March, the SDF announced that it had shifted 1,700 members from front lines in the Middle Euphrates Valley to the Afrin front.

=== The campaign resumes ===
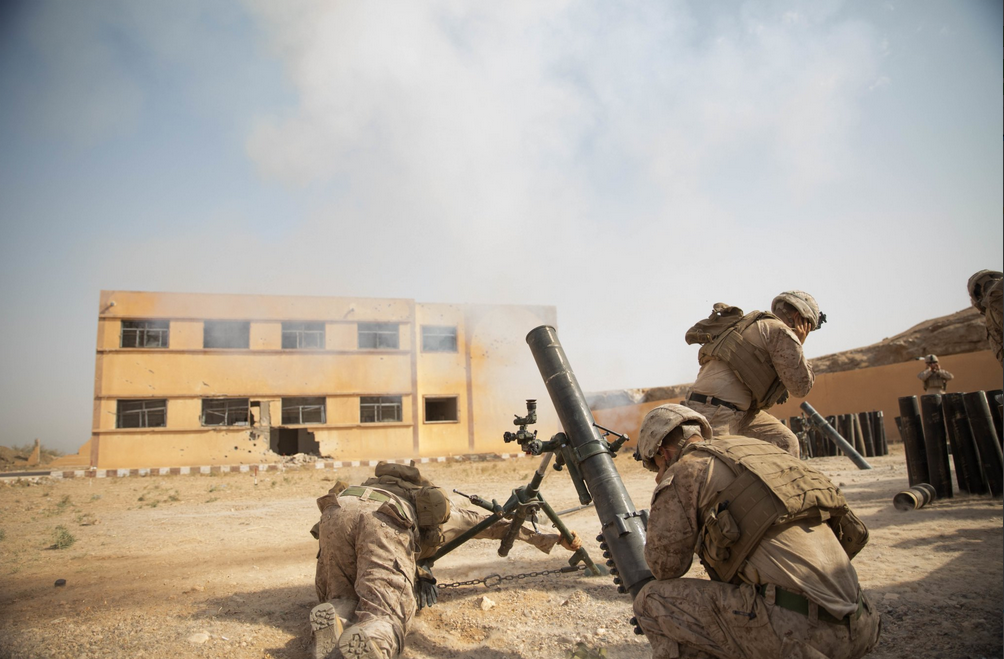
U.S. Marines fire mortars at a known ISIL position in the Middle Euphrates Valley in October 2018

On 1 May 2018, the SDF and U.S.-led coalition, in coordination with the Iraqi Armed Forces, announced the restart of the offensive to clear the Iraqi-Syria border and middle Euphrates river valley (MERV) of ISIL remnants, in what the coalition called Operation Roundup. On 3 May, Syriac Military Council and SDF spokesperson Kino Gabriel stated that SDF forces had advanced 8 kilometers (4.97 mi.) into ISIL territory on the al-Bughuz axis along the Iraqi border near the Euphrates river valley. On 8 May, an official YPG Twitter account posted images of SDF forces using mine-resistant ambush protected vehicles (MRAPs) partaking in an assault on ISIL front lines. The vehicle was previously unauthorized to be provisioned to SDF forces; Pentagon spokesman Marine Maj. Adrian Rankine-Galloway confirmed to Military Times that the US was providing MRAPs to the Syrian Arab Coalition, which he called "an essential component of the SDF."

On 10 May, Coalition forces announced the capturing of five senior ISIL commanders in a joint cross-border raid with SDF and Iraqi forces, in what Coalition officials called a "significant blow" to ISIL. The news prompted US President Donald Trump to announce on Twitter: "Five Most Wanted leaders of ISIS just captured!"

==== Capturing the Syrian-Iraqi border ====
Video about the capture of a border town during the campaign

By 13 May, the SDF had reportedly besieged and imposed full control over al-Baghuz Tahtani village – the first settlement seized from ISIL since the resumption of the desert offensive – on the east bank of the Euphrates, officially cutting ISIL access to the Iraqi border along the river. By 14 May, the SDF were conducting mine and tunnel clearing operations in al-Baghuz Tahtani as they had said to have taken a total of 64 kilometers of territory from ISIL. SOHR also reported that 18 ISIL fighters were killed in Coalition airstrikes in the town of al-Bahrah, further north along the river. Also on the same day, USCENTCOM commander Joseph Votel, Coalition commander Paul E. Funk II and other US personnel held a meeting with SDF leaders to "gain a better understanding of the fight against Daesh in the Middle Euphrates River Valley."

On 17 May, after several weeks of clashes, the SDF captured a number of border posts near Abu Kamal, completely besieging ISIL's Middle Euphrates Valley pocket between SDF forces and Syrian Army forces. By 20 July, after a couple months of clashes, the SDF had fully cleared ISIL from the southeastern al-Hasakah countryside, significantly reducing ISIL's border region pocket to the eastern Deir ez-Zor Province. On 4 August, the SDF fully captured the remainder of ISIL's Iraqi–Syrian border pocket in the eastern Deir ez-Zor countryside, reducing ISIL's territorial control to a single pocket in the Middle Euphrates Valley, in the area between Hajin and Abu Kamal. The SDF subsequently began preparations for the third and final phase of the operation, while ISIL launched counter-attacks in the al-Malh oil well area. At the time, experts considered it likely that Abu Bakr al-Baghdadi was hiding in this last pocket.

=== Third phase ===
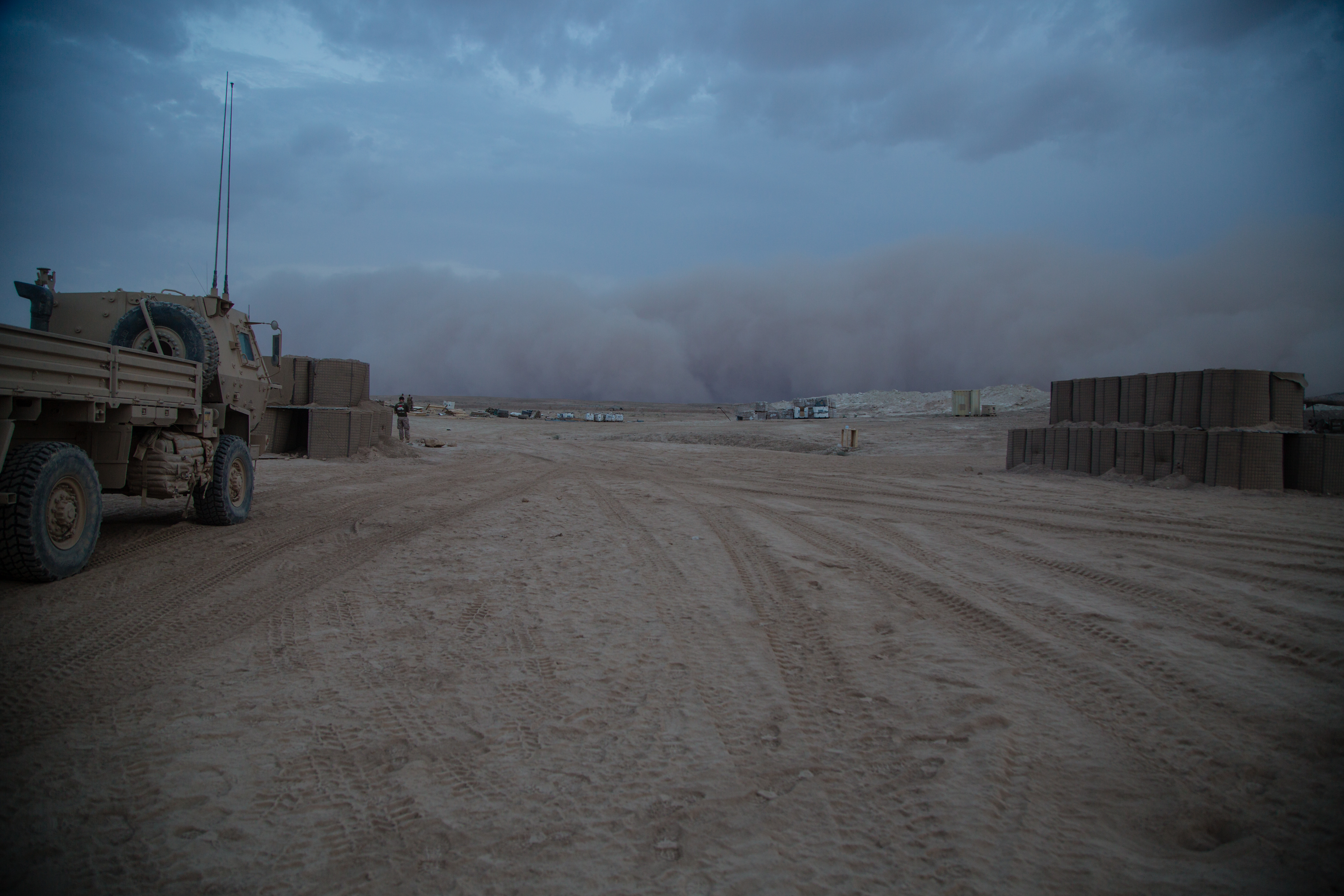
A sandstorm near the Iraqi-Syrian border on 13 June 2018. The Islamic State often used sandstorms and poor weather conditions as cover for their ground assaults.

On 10 September, the SDF began to advance from 4 different fronts towards the areas controlled by ISIL – the pocket with Hajin, al-Susa, al-Shafa, and the neighboring villages straddling the eastern banks of the Euphrates river. On the following day, 11 September, the third and final phase of the operation officially commenced, under the code name of "Terrorism Defeat Battle". According to the SDF, the first defense lines of ISIL were broken on September 13.

On 20 September, the SDF fully captured al-Baghuz Fawqani and secured the destroyed bridge to al-Bukamal. On the same day, ISIL counterattacked al-Baghuz Fawqani, with ISIL stating that they had killed 20 SDF fighters. On 25 September, the SDF captured the village of Ash Shājilah, north of al-Baghuz Fawqani. The next day, ISIL conducted multiple SVBIED attacks on SDF positions in al-Baghuz Fawqani, reportedly killing and injuring scores of SDF-affiliated Kurdish fighters, with a heavy firefight occurring soon after. Despite heavy resistance, the SDF continued to advance north of al-Baghuz Fawqani and captured parts of al-Marashidah village, located southwest of al-Susah.

==== ISIL breakout ====
The furthest extent of SDF advances prior to Islamic State counterattacks in the Middle Euphrates River Valley, 25 October 2018.

On 10 October, ISIL launched a large counterattack under the cover of a large sandstorm, which resulted in the death of a French YPG volunteer, while they also managed to capture an MRAP-style vehicle from the SDF near al-Baghuz Fawqani. On 12 October, ISIL continued its counterattack, which resulted in the killing and capturing of at least 45 SDF fighters, as well as the recapture of multiple positions. On 19 October, ISIL reportedly infiltrated and crossed through areas held by Syrian governmental forces and their allies, to reinforce its Euphrates pocket from the Syrian Desert. On 20 October, the SOHR stated that the US-led coalition had carried out two "massacres" via airstrikes in al-Susah, resulting in the deaths of 58, including 41 civilians, with ISIL only receiving 11–17 casualties in the strikes; 10 children were also reported to have been killed.

On 22 October, the SDF launched a new assault on ISIL positions in al-Susah, resulting in half of the town being captured and al-Marashidah being cut off. They also disabled an ISIL SVBIED by killing the driver, reportedly with a sniper rifle. On 23 October, the SDF continued their advance after clashes continued through the night. ISIL attempted to counterattack and reportedly used four SVBIEDs on SDF positions in Susah. Supported by heavy coalition air and artillery support, the SDF repelled the assault and restarted their own attack. In the morning, they captured the village of Hawi al Susah, which is adjacent to the town of Susah. In Hajin, sporadic clashes continued between the two sides. On 24 October, fighting in Susah was still intense. Over the night, ISIL launched several assaults using armored cars and SVBIEDs to break through the encirclement of Marashidah, in which they still had fighters holding out, and to push back the SDF before they can consolidate their positions. Under heavy artillery bombardment, they temporarily opened a corridor, which allowed some of their units to escape. The SDF stated to have killed 10 fighters themselves, as well as destroying a vehicle and an SVBIED, while the coalition reportedly killed another 41 ISIL militants with airstrikes and artillery. On the same day, the coalition stated on Twitter to have bombed a mosque in Susah that was being used by ISIL as a fighting position.

The Euphrates pocket by 31 October 2018, showing SDF territorial loss after ISIL counterattacks

On 27 October, the SDF's Deir ez-Zor Military Council suffered heavy losses and YPG units were moved to the frontline in order to stabilize the front. After even further setbacks, the SDF retreated from all captured positions in the Hajin pocket on October 28, effectively concluding their seven-week offensive without any gains. ISIL continued its counterattack on 29 October with the group retaking control of the towns of Marshidah, Mouzan, Safafinah, Shajlah, and Baghouz al-Fawqani as well as al-Susah from the SDF, forcing the Kurds to retreat after becoming overwhelmed. In response to the successful ISIL counterattack along the Iraqi-Syrian border, the Popular Mobilization Forces were deployed along the Iraqi side of the border in Anbar Governorate, in fears of an ISIL cross-border infiltration. On Twitter, pictures from the town of Jabal al-Baghouz showed ISIL flags being raised in the town. Coalition spokesman Colonel Sean Ryan said that coalition elements were helping "expedite" SDF reinforcement and resupply efforts, and stated that ISIL was making a "last stand" in the pocket.

After border skirmishes between Turkish Armed Forces and Kurdish elements in Kobanî and Tell Abyad, the SDF once again halted the offensive against ISIL. Despite the main offensive being on hold, on 6 November, the SDF Press Office announced that 49 ISIL fighters had been killed after ISIL launched attacks on the Hajin front that were repulsed within the previous 24 hours; three tunnels, ten compounds, and a "bomb-laden vehicle" were all destroyed by the SDF. In addition, the coalition bombed 27 targets. On the same day, the Iraqi Al Mada newspaper reported that the Popular Mobilization Forces had crossed into Syrian territory and seized 30 fortified border posts in areas previously abandoned by the SDF after the 26 October ISIL counterattack.

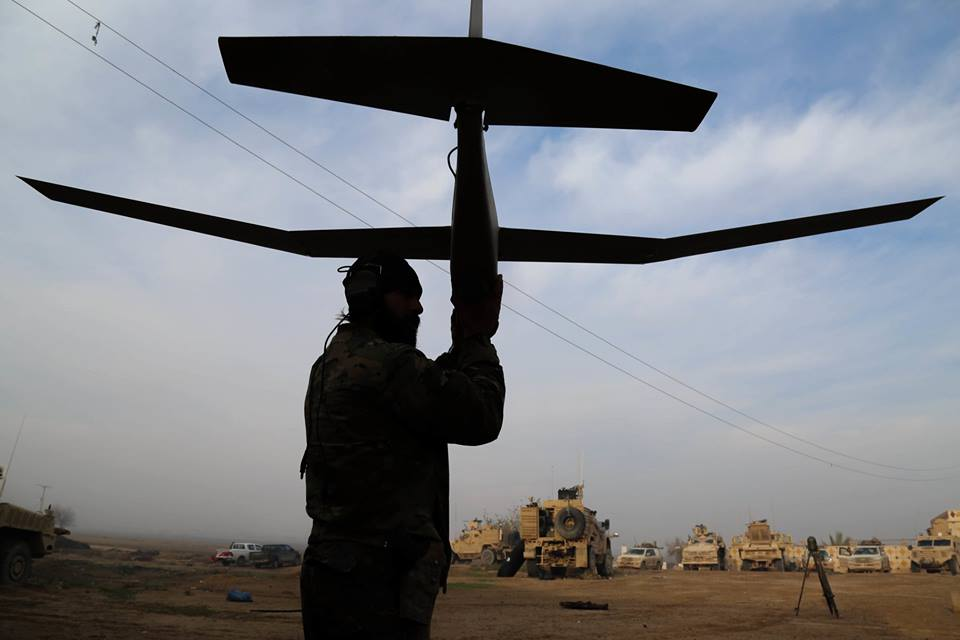
A US commando prepares to launch a RQ-20 Puma scout drone near Hajin, 19 November

On 11 November, the SDF announced that they had restarted the offensive. During the intermediary period of halted ground operations, the coalition had continued a heavy bombardment campaign targeting ISIL fighting positions, tunnels, mortars, staging areas, and weapons caches. It was reported that individual houses of ISIL commanders were being given out by spies, as well as locations of weapons caches, and that ISIL had executed a civilian on charges of being a spy, but this was not confirmed by any official source.

On 23–24 November, around 500 ISIL fighters took advantage of foggy, low-visibility weather to attempt a breakout of the Hajin pocket, by launching a "broad" counterattack north of Hajin towards al-Bahrah, Gharanij, and the al-Tanak oilfield, killing at least 47 SDF soldiers – 29 on Saturday alone – in the assaults; in turn, 39 ISIL militants were killed in both ground clashes and Coalition airstrikes. The village of al-Bahrah was reportedly captured by ISIL, while the other two assaults were repelled. The SOHR added that Coalition air raids also killed 17 civilians – including five children – during the clashes. Coalition spokesman Sean Ryan denied receiving reports of civilian casualties and that close air support had been "very limited" due to bad weather. Furthermore, ISIL stated to have captured at least 10 SDF fighters – including a commander – during the counterattack, with the group subsequently releasing images and video to corroborate the statement. By 26 November, as ISIL fighters had largely retreated back to their previous positions after Coalition-supported SDF push back, the fighting had reportedly killed over 200 people as more bodies were recovered on the 25th. SOHR reported 51 civilians had been killed and 92 SDF fighters were killed in the weekend fighting, the "largest number of SDF fighters killed (by IS) in a single battle since it was founded".

==== Battle of Hajin ====
CJTF-OIR Coalition ISR drone footage of an ISIL gunman shooting from within the Hajin hospital, 9 December 2018

On 3 December, local activist sources reported that SDF forces had advanced on ISIL's new de facto capital of Hajin and had broken into the town after overrunning ISIL defenses on its northwestern flank from al-Bahrah. By 4 December, SDF forces had reportedly advanced into the northern sector of Hajin, capturing the local hospital and the al-Hawamah neighborhood and market area. On 6 December, Redur Khalil, an SDF commander, confirmed their forces had pushed into Hajin and had taken portions of the town, including some neighborhoods and a mosque, but not the hospital, amidst ongoing heavy clashes. By 7 December the SDF had taken about half of the town and had also opened a humanitarian corridor for Hajin, allowing over 1,000 civilians – mostly women and children – to flee ISIL's embattled capital. The Coalition stepped up airstrikes to support the SDF's advance, with a 5 December press release detailing multiple strikes conducted near Hajin targeting ISIL supply routes, tunnels, fighting positions and trucks. Syrian state media stated a Coalition airstrike in Hajin on 7 December completely destroyed the local hospital along with killing eight civilians, all from the same family. The Coalition denied civilian casualties in their airstrikes and disputed that the hospital was destroyed. On 11 December, Coalition spokesman Col. Sean Ryan confirmed to Talk Media News that the Hajin hospital was not bombed on 7 December and that SDF units began receiving small arms fire from ISIL elements on the second and third floors of the facility on 8 December as it was being used as a "command and control node" by the terror group due to its strategic location. The next day an explosion occurred at the building, to which the Coalition stated was the result of rigged explosives placed by ISIL; when SDF units captured the hospital on 10 December, they reported the building was "heavily mined with IEDs" in the remaining structure.

On 11 December, the SDF, along with reversing some of ISIL's recent gains and making fresh advancements in Hajin, managed to recapture the border town of al-Baghuz Tahtani, securing the entire Syrian-Iraqi border once again and regaining much of the lost territory from the October ISIL counterattacks. By 12 December, the Coalition estimated there were still 2,500 of the "most hardened" ISIL fighters in the Hajin holdout. US Special Presidential Envoy to the anti-ISIL Coalition Brett H. McGurk said "We've gotten to a point where almost every ISIS fighter is wearing a suicide vest, the extent of IEDs and placements, it's very, very difficult fighting and so it's taking some time." Since the initial break-in of western Hajin, recent SDF front line advances in the town had been modest and methodical as ISIL reportedly had placed many mines and IEDs in residential areas, dug an extensive tunnel network, and had snipers placed in taller buildings – along with reportedly using stranded civilians as human shields, according to SDF fighters on the ground. Furthermore, 2,500 civilians had by now fled towards SDF territory as the SDF reported to have killed 55 ISIL militants since entering Hajin. By 13 December heavy clashes continued in the town center as Coalition airstrikes continued to bombard ISIL positions. As the SDF advanced, capturing two more hospitals in the process, ISIL detonated five booby trapped vehicles in an attempt to hinder SDF progress, but the traps failed. Later in the day, SOHR and local unofficial sources reported that Islamic State defenses in Hajin had collapsed and the jihadist forces were fleeing to the stronghold's eastern outskirts; Kurdish Twitter accounts showed the SDF flag perched atop the main bazaar, signaling the SDF had indeed captured the town center.

By dawn on 14 December, SDF forces – spearheaded by the Kurdish YPG – fully captured Hajin as ISIL defenses collapsed, due to an intensified ground push supported by increased Coalition airstrikes. The capture of Hajin town proper deprived the Islamic State of a significant command and control hub, and the terror group's last chunk of significant urban territory; ISIL's battered militants, aided by their tunnel networks, withdrew south to the rural village areas east of the Euphrates river and west of SDF positions along the Iraqi border. SDF spokesman Mustafa Bali confirmed that sporadic pockets of ISIL elements were still harassing and counterattacking Hajin post-capture in the surrounding fields and outskirts and that the fight for the town was "difficult" as the entrenched ISIL fighters the SDF besieged were hardened veterans from Iraq and Syria "fighting to the death", putting up stubborn resistance and stiff defenses. Europe-based activist Omar Abu Layla stated that disagreements among ISIL ranks over hierarchy between Iraqi and Syrian fighters helped speed up the collapse of the extremist group's defenses in the town. SOHR added that since the launch of the third phase of the Deir ez-Zor campaign on 10 September, 922 ISIL gunmen, 539 SDF fighters, and 324 civilians – of which were 113 children and 72 women – had died in the deadly fighting for the enclave. SOHR continued that the majority of the civilian casualties were from Coalition airstrikes.

Colonel Francois-Regis Legrier, a senior French officer whom had been directing French artillery during the campaign as part of Task Force Wagram since October 2018, would later publicly criticize the Coalition's tactics during the battle in an article in France's National Defense Review. Colonel Legrier argued that the Coalition's heavy emphasis on airstrikes and heavy artillery rather than ground engagements may have minimized their own losses but "massively destroyed the infrastructure" and "unnecessarily prolonged the conflict and thus contributed to increasing the number" of civilian casualties. He suggested that a ground force of 1,000 Coalition troops against the 2,000 technologically inferior ISIL fighters would have ended the battle for Hajin much more quickly and efficiently. Legrier's remarks reportedly embarrassed French authorities, with the article being removed and a French army spokesman saying that a "punishment is being considered" for the officer.

==== Clearing the Euphrates pocket ====
With the capture of the Hajin stronghold – the Islamic State's last de facto capital – on 14 December, ISIL fighters retreated to the remaining rural villages still under their grasp within the pocket. SDF commander-in-chief Mazlum Kobane said that at least 5,000 ISIL fighters were still in the remaining pocket. He said about 2,000 are foreign members, mostly Arabs and Europeans with their families. The U.S. estimated there were still a diehard contingent of 2,500 ISIL fighters entrenched within the remaining enclave as the Islamic State still controlled the villages of Al-Susah, Al-Marashidah, Al-Shaafah, al-Baghuz Fawqani, al-Shajla and surrounding settlements. It was reported that more than 700 prisoners including deserters were executed by ISIL since it lost Hajin.

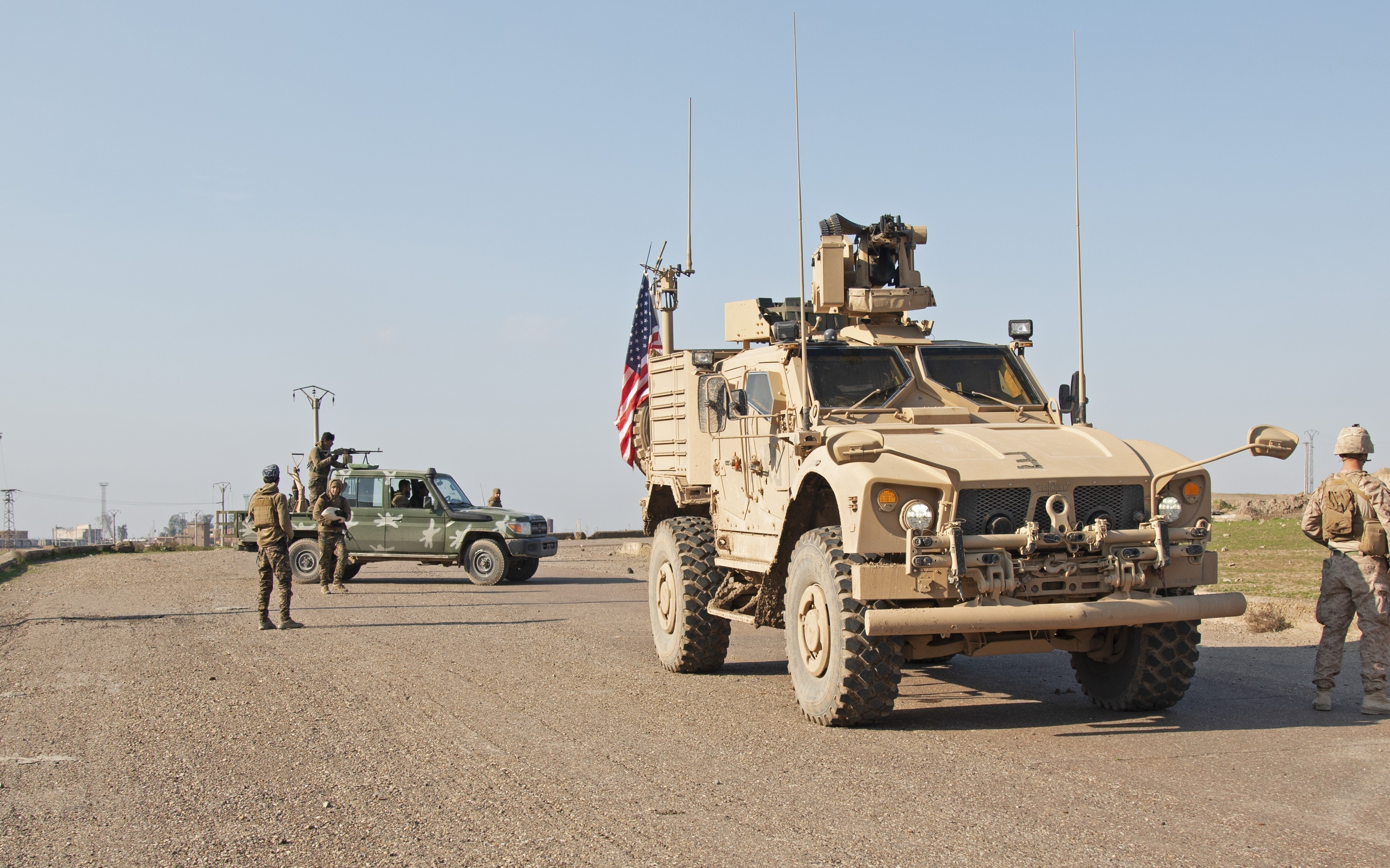
An SDF-U.S. checkpoint, 23 December 2018

On 14 December, SDF forces reportedly advanced south of Hajin, pushing towards the towns of Abu Hassan and Abu Al-Khatir amidst ongoing clashes. It was also reported that ISIL was attempting to break through SDF defenses and retake Baghuz Tahtani, in the southern sector of the pocket, on the Iraqi border. By 21 December, after capturing the al-Qal'ah area southwest of Hajin, SDF troops reportedly made a major advancement in the town of Abu al-Khatir, as Coalition airstrikes pounded ISIL units and forced them to fall back to the town center. Local sources also reported that ISIL had made Al-Susah its new headquarters. On 25 December, local sources confirmed the SDF had taken the key town of Abu al-Khatir after days of clashes, with the help of continued Coalition airstrikes, securing an adequate buffer zone around Hajin; subsequent clashes were reported in Abu Hassan as the SDF continued its advance southward, down the Euphrates. The SOHR reported that the SDF had rounded up 262 ISIL militants trying to flee among the civilian exodus from the region by 25 December; 5,500 civilians had so far reportedly fled the pocket since the announcement of the withdrawal of US troops from Syria on 19 December. Local activist sources reported on the 28th that the SDF had captured half of Al-Kashmah with ISIL still occupying the southern half; capturing Al-Kashmah would put the SDF within adequate striking distance of Al-Shaafah for the first time. The SDF made limited advances on the Al-Kashmah front and the al-Susah axis against ISIL forces by 30 December, with SDF contact lines reportedly reaching near the immediate eastern outskirts of al-Susah, while the SDF controlled around 70 percent of Al-Kashmah, with fierce clashes raging. By 31 December, the SDF had fully captured Al-Kashmah and were fighting for control of Al-Shaafah, the last major town from the northern approach before ISIL's Al-Susah.

On 5 January 2019, two British special forces soldiers (presumably from the Special Air Service) were injured in an attack carried out by ISIL; one Kurd also died. US troops evacuated the two soldiers. On 7 January, the SOHR reported that ISIL units took advantage of bad weather and launched a counteroffensive against the SDF in the pocket, killing 23 and wounding others, while ISIL suffered 9 casualties. By the next day, the SDF had repelled the offensive and had gained more ground from ISIL near the Iraqi border. On the same day, Coalition warplanes and artillery continued to bombard the town of Al-Shaafah, as the SDF continued its approach towards Al-Susah. On 9 January the SDF released images of eight foreign ISIL fighters their units had captured during a recent "special operation". The captured included Russian, German, Uzbek, Tajik, Ukrainian and Kazakh nationals, as well as an American teenager. On 10 January the SDF reportedly fully captured Al-Shaafah after expelling ISIL fighters in a counterattack. The SDF continued to advance on the Abu Badran area. With continued US and French airstrikes in support, SDF forces reportedly captured most of Abu Badran after overrunning ISIL defenses in the northern portion of the village on 13 January. After the recent gains in the pocket against ISIL and ramping up their attacks in the previous two days, SDF spokesman Mustafa Bali told Reuters that ISIL "are living the final moments and realize that this battle is the battle to eliminate them."

On 15 January, the SDF's Deir ez-Zor Military Council, the spearheading fighting force during the campaign, launched a final major push south to storm al-Susah, after capturing Abu Badran and the al-Ulay'at region from ISIL forces. At the time, it was believed that ISIL's central command was headquartered at al-Susah and that their leader Abu Bakr Al-Baghdadi may also potentially be held up there. On the same day, reports emerged – particularly from the SOHR – that the SDF had already pushed ISIL out of al-Susah, but this was not confirmed by the SDF or the Coalition. Frontline reports confirmed the SDF had fully taken al-Susah by 17 January, with ISIL combatants ultimately retreating further southward to avoid being overrun. The loss of al-Susah was a heavy blow against the Islamic State, as the terrorist organization's territorial control in the pocket had dwindled to four key towns: Al-Marashidah, Mozan, al-Shajlah, and as-Safafinah (though clashes still continued at Al-Baghuz Fawqani). Following the capture of al-Susah, reports emerged of shelling in al-Marashidah and of ISIL targeting SDF units in al-Susah with VBIEDs. On the next day, the SDF's media center released a report detailing their recent engagements. Under near-constant Coalition air support, SDF fighters advanced 1.5 km, capturing 32 new points on a secondary front line of the Al-Susah axis, leading to separate heavy clashes with ISIL, in which SDF troops seized ammo and weapons from slain ISIL fighters, including SDF troops detonating four ISIL motorbikes loaded with explosives. Afterward, ISIL once again took advantage of bad weather and launched raids on SDF frontline positions, but were repelled. The SDF reported that 88 ISIL fighters had been killed, while they lost 10 of their own fighters with an additional 30 wounded. On 20 January, the SOHR reported that Coalition airstrikes on Al-Baghuz Fawqani had killed six civilians, including four children, as well as killing 10 ISIL militants. Coalition airstrikes reportedly intensified after the ISIL-claimed Manbij bombing that claimed the lives of four Americans.

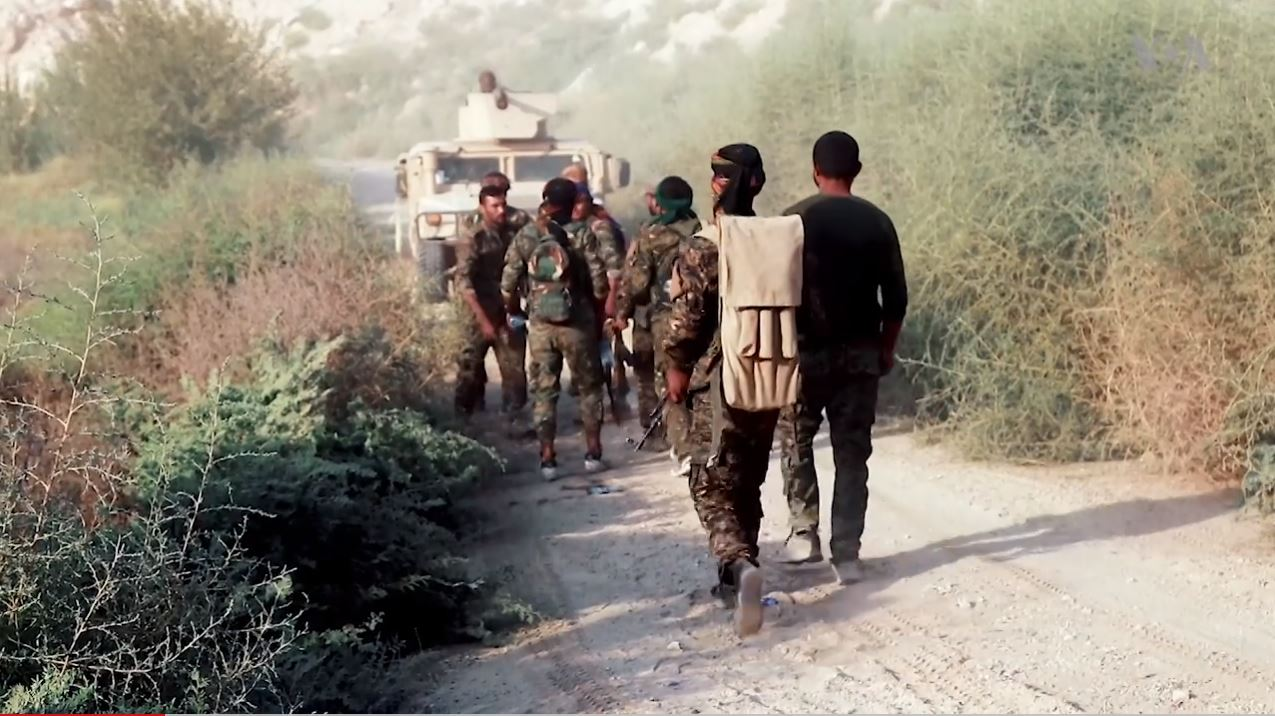
SDF fighters near Hajin, 22 January 2019

By 22 January, the SDF had managed to capture 75 percent of as-Safafinah, after capturing the Mozan rural area, confining ISIL to just two remaining villages – al-Shajlah and al-Marashidah – along the Euphrates River. Heavy clashes continued on the outskirts of al-Shajlah and the al-Baghuz Fawqani front, with half of the latter town under SDF control. As ISIL's territorial control was being squeezed out due to the string of recent losses, a massive influx of fleeing civilians ensued, with hundreds leaving the increasingly-small pocket on 22 January, most of them family members of ISIL militants. The civilian exodus continued, as SDF and Kurdish social media accounts posted pictures reportedly showing the relatives of Islamic State fighters fleeing; many of them included nationals from France, Pakistan, Iraq, and Turkey. Morale among remaining jihadist fighters hit an all-time low, with the fighters surrendering in the dozens (as per ANHA) to hundreds (as per SOHR) with reportedly over 60 fighters – 50 of them foreign – surrendering to the SDF in recent days. SOHR reported that 4,900 people – including 470 surrendered ISIL fighters – had fled the enclave since 21 January, 3,500 on 22 January alone. Meanwhile, the whereabouts and fate of ISIL's elusive leader Abu Bakr al-Baghdadi were still unknown. The SOHR also reported that the new wave of departures meant that a total of 27,000 people had by now fled the enclave since early December 2018. Zana Amedia, an SDF spokesman, attributed their ground momentum in recent weeks to a change of investment tactics after their frontlines collapsed in late October 2018, due to an aggressive ISIL counterattack during a sandstorm. "After that, the leadership took a decision to change tactics, and moved us to attacking on two – or even three – axes so that the small force that ISIS has cannot counter," said Amedia. "Right now, the operation is going on two axes – from the north, we are attacking the village of Al-Marashidah, and from the south, the village of Baghuz."

The SDF fully overran and recaptured al-Baghuz Fawqani on 23 January, after weeks of desperate ISIL resistance there ended with the collapse of their forces; the SDF promptly began mine-clearing and sweeping operations in the surrounding farms and communities, to find any hiding enemy militants. The capture of Baghuz Fawqani prompted the SOHR to proclaim the imminent defeat of ISIL in Deir ez-Zor, with the jihadist group only possessing 10 square km of remaining territory in the Middle Euphrates Pocket, and the remainder of their die-hard combatants holed up in scattered homesteads among the irrigated fields and orchards on the north bank of the valley. The US-led Coalition declined to say when it expected the SDF to capture the last chunk of ISIL territory, with spokesman Sean Ryan instead emphasizing that the bigger goal of the operation was to minimize and degrade ISIL's insurgency and terror capabilities by depriving them of physical space to operate. "We try to stay away from timelines as it is more about degrading the enemy's capabilities," Ryan said. On the same day, the villages of as-Safafinah and al-Shajlah were also reported to have been overrun by the SDF backed by heavy French and American shelling, leaving al-Marashidah as the last stronghold in ISIL's grip – merely 0.01 percent of the territory its self-proclaimed caliphate once held.

==== ISIL's last stand ====
On 24 January, SDF forces began swiftly crossing the northern bridge into al-Marashidah – ISIL's then-final stronghold – forcing ISIL to withdraw towards the center of the town. In response, ISIL launched a counterattack and regained parts of al-Shajlah before the attack was repelled. By the next day, another counterattack allowed ISIL to regain parts of western Baghuz Fawqani, to the south of the area, with ISIL attempting to break the SDF's siege with suicide attacks. During ISIL's attempted breakout, Syrian Arab Army units that had deployed across the river targeted the Islamic State's poorly established positions at the town as well, indirectly assisting the Kurds. 35 ISIL fighters were killed and another 21 captured during the failed breakout attempt; in turn, 16 SDF fighters were killed and at least 30 were injured. At this point, SDF commander Mazloum Kobani predicted that the SDF would complete their campaign and end ISIL's military presence within a "month", only declaring victory after establishing control over the captured lands. On 25 January, ANHA reported that 150 ISIL fighters surrendered to the SDF in al-Baghuz Fawqani, with most of them being foreign fighters. The front lines at Baghuz Fawqani remained fluid on the 26th as Coalition bombardment continued on the village with ISIL continuing stiff resistance in south Marashidah as units from the Free Syrian Army's Kurdish-aligned Northern Democratic Brigade reportedly clashed with ISIL in northern Marashidah. Reports also emerged that an ISIL commander named Bashar Al-Mughbel was killed in Coalition airstrikes in Baghuz Fawqani as SOHR reported that Coalition air raids and short-range missile strikes on hamlets and other civilian areas had killed 42 people in the pocket in recent days, including 13 civilians consisting of seven Syrians linked to ISIL – including three children from the same family – and six Iraqi non-combatants.

Overnight clashes between the 26th and 27th killed 19 ISIL and 11 SDF fighters, SOHR reported, adding that the aerial bombardment was some of the fiercest in two weeks. Additionally, 4 SVBIEDs targeted SDF positions when ISIL mounted another counterattack to break the siege. By 27 January it became clear that Kurdish and US officials did not believe ISIL's leader Abu Bakr al-Baghdadi was still holed up in the pocket. "He would have to be stupid to stay in the last pocket until the end," SDF spokesman Zana Amedi said. "He would have escaped a long time ago before the situation deteriorated for them so much. He's not dead, and he's not in these villages, either." On 28 January the SDF managed to capture parts of northern Al-Marashidah and besieged ISIL within a space of only 4 square kilometers of land, boxing them up against the Euphrates. As clashes continued, SDF commander Heval Roni commented, "Geographically speaking, there are only four square kilometres left under IS control, stretching from Baghouz to the Iraqi border". He also stated that the dwindling number of remaining ISIL officers and commanders were mostly Iraqi. Meanwhile, SOHR reported some 2,000 people, including 300 ISIL gunmen, had fled the area since the 27th; among the commotion, the SDF captured a local ISIL commander and a body guard.

===== Civilian exodus =====
By 28 January, ISIL was reported to have parts of al-Marashidah, al-Arqoub, Safafinah, and Baghuz Fawqani villages still under their control, as well as some orchards in the town of Al-Susah. On 29 January, SDF spokesman Mustafa Bali told Reuters that instead of an all-out storming of the last bastion of ISIL territory, the SDF's advance had slowed due to the large presence of civilians, many of whom were wives or children of ISIL fighters. Bali added that they were conducting "precise operations", which took more time. He added that the SDF had also refused an offer from the jihadists via mediators to surrender the territory in return for safe passage out. The International Rescue Committee charity organization said it was helping tend to a sudden influx of more than 10,000 people, almost all of whom were women, children, and elderly people, who had arrived at an internally displaced persons camp in Al-Hawl in northeastern Syria, since the previous week. The IRC said most of them were exhausted, extremely hungry, and thirsty as they fled ISIL territory, with many arriving barefoot. Meanwhile, acting U.S. Defense Secretary Patrick M. Shanahan stated that the remaining territory will be taken in a few weeks.

On 30 January, it was reported that a Coalition air raid over Marashidah killed Mohammed Mahmoud al-Abadi (Abu Osama al-Qurashi), a senior ISIL figure that held several positions in the Islamic State, including commander of the "Islamic Police", Minister of Oil, and senior security commander. Meanwhile, the Kurdistan Region's Special Office for Yezidi Abductees Affairs reported that SDF units had freed three Yazidi prisoners from ISIL – aged 12, 30, and 40 – during their ongoing conquest against ISIL. Islamic State jihadists reportedly abducted these women when they entered the Sinjar region in 2014. On 15 January an Iraqi official stated that ISIL elements were still trafficking Yazidi women across Iraq and Syria despite the collapse of their "caliphate". On 31 January, the SDF made limited advances between Safafinah and Baghuz Fawqani while also advancing on Arqoub (western Marashidah), a strategically important sector for ISIL as they've used the bridge there to cross the river to escape to their refuge in the Syrian desert. Later, the SDF pulled back from some areas of Baghuz Fawqani to avoid harming civilians. More than 150 people were rescued. By the end of the month, ISIL reportedly still controlled Baghuz Tahtani on the Iraqi border as well after an SDF tactical retreat.

With the large number of civilians fleeing the war zone, the SDF had significantly slowed down their advance by 1 February, in fear of ISIL using non-combatants as human shields. SDF-ISIL clashes in the pocket also decreased in intensity as ISIL tried to negotiate for a safe passage to evacuate towards the Turkish border. The SDF and the Coalition rejected this, instead demanding a full surrender from the remaining jihadists and their commanders. Meanwhile, it was reported that after the previous ISIL commander was killed, a Saudi named al-Jazrawi was in command of the remaining pocket. During this lull in ground clashes, civilians continued to leave ISIL areas in droves with SDF and American SOF soldiers handing out water, nappies and MREs to the families of ISIL members and other civilians at makeshift screening centers set up to help process the outflow of people; among the often haggard, famished, and dust-covered IDPs, males were screened separately in search of fleeing ISIL militants, who were known to be mixing in with the innocent civilians. In the early morning of 5 February, 5 Turkish families surrendered themselves along with other women and children. On 6 February, 12 Iraqi families, 14 Syrian families, four Azerbaijani families, and two Canadian women surrendered themselves to the SDF. Five ISIL child soldiers aged between 14 and 15 also surrendered. Meanwhile, the Coalition carried out two airstrikes on Baghuz Fawqani after an Iraqi drone was shot down, in the first airstrikes in days.

Voice of America report on the Al-Hawl refugee camp, 7 February 2019

On 6 February, US President Donald Trump, while at a summit of 79 foreign ministers and officials that have partaken in the global coalition against ISIL, predicted a formal announcement of a final victory against ISIL as early as the upcoming week despite front line advances recently being halted. "Remnants – that's all they have, remnants – but remnants can be very dangerous," Trump said in regards to ISIL. "Rest assured, we'll do what it takes to defeat every ounce and every last person within the ISIS madness". In regards to captured militants, SDF spokesman Mustafa Bali said that the SDF is detaining foreign ISIL fighters on a "daily basis." Suspected militants captured by the SDF were usually eager to be sent home, something the Kurdish administration also wants. Human Rights Watch had warned that any transfers of suspected foreign militants and their relatives out of Syria should be a transparent process.

On 7 February, the SDF captured Al-Marashidah and its western district of Arqoub, as well as other areas nearby, completely besieging the remaining ISIL fighters in the town of Al-Baghuz Fawqani, to the south of Al-Marashidah. Later on the same day, SDF commander Adel Cudi stated that the SDF controlled 80% of Baghuz Fawqani and were advancing slowly against the last ISIL-held positions. Late on 8 February, Mustafa Bali said that the SDF would launch a final assault on the remainder of the enclave once civilians had been completely evacuated. "There is of course a safe corridor and civilians are coming out daily, and this reduces their number in Baghouz until we can be sure the town is free of civilians," Bali said. "We will launch an attack to end the Daesh presence or they will turn themselves in. There are no other options for them. We confirm there are no negotiations and no intention to have negotiations," he added.

===== Final assault =====
The SDF's conquest of the ISIL enclave from 30 November 2018 to 23 March 2019

On the evening of 9 February, the Syrian Democratic Forces announced that they were launching the final "decisive" battle, after nearly ten days of evacuating 20,000 civilians, most of whom were ISIL family members. Redur Kalil, the SDF's senior public relations officer, told The Times newspaper that a number of foreign hostages were possibly being held in the enclave. The operation began with a heavy preemptive bombardment during the afternoon, from the SDF missile and mortar teams and Coalition warplanes. The Coalition estimated ISIL still had around 1,000–1,500 of its most loyal jihadist fighters still fighting within the enclave, though the SDF and SOHR estimated that ISIL still had around 3,000 fighters within the enclave.

Between 9–10 February, the SDF was able to capture a total of 2 square kilometers and seized control of 41 tactical points. The SDF reported the deaths of 37 ISIL members, along with the destruction of 19 locations, one enemy motorbike, four roads, one mortar, and one weapons cache in the preemptive airstrikes leading up to the assault, while only losing two of their own. The Syrian government stated the recent airstrikes had killed several civilians, including four people near a makeshift refugee camp near Baghuz. On the morning of 11 February, the SDF repelled another ISIL counterattack, as another 1,500 civilians fled the area in a column of 17 trucks filled with men, women, and children, some identifying as Iraqi. The SDF advance was gradual and precise, as hundreds of civilians continued to stream out of the war zone into SDF-Coalition screening centers, established to filter out fleeing jihadists. On 12 February, SDF spokesman Mustafa Bali announced that ISIL only had control over 1 square kilometer of territory, and that all those remaining in the area were ISIL militants and their families.

On 16 February, one week into the battle, SDF commander Jiya Furat stated that the besieged pocket was reduced to an encircled 700 square meters and that a declaration of victory against ISIL in the pocket was soon to come. The battle had stalled into a standoff by late February, as the SDF chose to wait until every possible civilian fled the remaining territory before storming it, delaying declaration of victory and extending the battle into a protracted siege. Attrition became a larger factor as the surrounded jihadists were letting their families, other hostages, and more expendable fighters leave due to dwindling food resources from the SDF's encirclement, with hundreds of civilians and dozens of surrendering militants regularly flowing out of the enclave. The evacuees included shattered families that lost loved ones and wounded, exhausted and hungry men, women, and children. A number of the fleeing wives were interviewed by international media, giving accounts of their journey to and conditions under ISIL's "caliphate", some describing how they lived in dug-up holes with hoisted tents to protect against airstrikes. While some were more critical, others proclaimed their continuing devotion to the idea of the Islamic State, even after surrender. "We weren't going to leave, but the Caliph said women should leave," said one mother, referring to ISIL leader Abu Bakr al-Baghdadi reportedly ordering women and children to leave. "I wanted to stay. It is an Islamic State. It is land of Islam," she added. SDF officials had previously denied that they were negotiating with ISIL, but Coalition spokesman Sean Ryan confirmed on 6 March that negotiations were taking place, through which the SDF was "diligently" trying to find out information regarding any hostages held by ISIL.

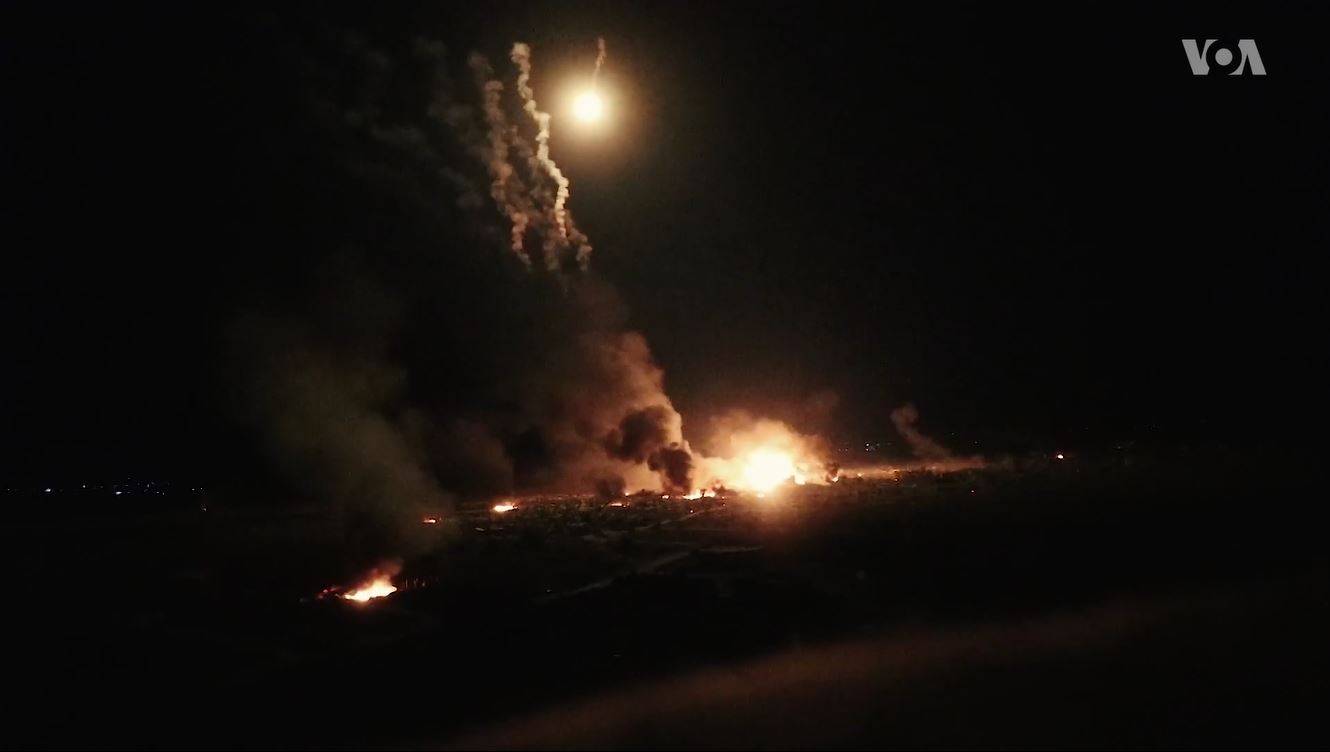
The ISIL camp at al-Baghuz Fawqani under nighttime siege, 12 March 2019

By 9 March, one month into the protracted battle/stand-off, many evacuating ISIL militants and their families remained unrepentant and devoted to the "caliphate". Around two dozen interviewed evacuees described their last days in the besieged camp and how ISIL's Hisbah religious police continued to maintain order and religious enforcement in the camp amidst SDF-Coalition encirclement. The Hisbah oversaw the civilian evacuations from ISIL's end, seeing the SDF's evacuation attempts as facilitating their longevity. According to media reports, a number of the evacuees sometimes berated and harassed reporters and photographers at evacuation areas. Others spoke about their situation; many were still devoted to ISIL and hoping for future "conquests", while some were more ambivalent. They saw ISIL's territorial collapse as punishment from God due to corruption among ISIL leadership and officials. On 17 March, the SDF released their figures on the operation since 9 January: 34,000 total civilians evacuated, 29,600 ISIL fighters and their family members surrendered, including more than 5,000 fighters, 1,306 ISIL militants killed, and 520 captured in operations. In turn, they put their casualties at 11 dead and 61 injured.

On 18 March, a U.S. F-15E airstrike on a crowd of people fleeing the clashes in Baghuz killed up to 80, including 64 women and children. A U.S. drone operated from Al Udeid Air Base had identified the gathering as civilians and the operators were reportedly surprised at the strike. According to U.S. Central Command, a prior ISIL counterattack that lasted several hours had nearly overran SDF positions and in response, U.S. special forces unit Task Force 9 called in the airstrike. The U.S. military said the bombing killed 16 ISIL fighters and only officially confirmed four civilian deaths, as Central Command argued that some ISIL family members had taken up arms and therefore "could not strictly be classified as civilians". The incident was covered up by the SDF and Coalition and would not be revealed to the public until November 2021.

On 23 March 2019, the SDF announced full liberation of ISIL's enclave, concluding the battle of Baghuz Fawqani and capping off the campaign. The whereabouts of ISIL's leader Abu Bakr al-Baghdadi remained unknown at the time as the SDF transitioned into counterinsurgency operations.

== SDF-Syrian government clashes ==
During the night of 7 February 2018, US forces attacked positions of pro-Syrian government forces with airstrikes, following a pro-government incursion on the frontline with the SDF, stating it was out of self-defense of an SDF headquarters with US observers in Khusham. US officials estimated that more than 100 members of the pro-government forces were killed. Russian Ministry of Defense however stated that the pro-government forces were conducting reconnaissance missions against ISIL. An injured pro-government fighter also stated that SDF forces had infiltrated during the airstrikes in Tabiyyah region but were repelled. There were also reports by pro-opposition sources that clashes had erupted between SDF and SAA and allied pro-government forces. Pro-government Al-Masdar News downplayed these statements and suggested they might have been a scare campaign led by opposition media.

On 29 April 2018, the Syrian Army launched an assault on four SDF-held villages on the eastern side of the Euphrates River, initially capturing them. According to the Syrian Observatory for Human Rights (SOHR), nine pro-government and six SDF-affiliated fighters were killed in the clashes. SDF spokesperson Kino Gabriel stated that the clashes were "supporting terrorism and an attempt to obstruct the war against terrorism". Several hours later, the SDF stated they recaptured all of the villages they lost, Some local sources stated that US-led coalition jets hit pro-government forces attacking the SDF, although the Pentagon stated they only conducted warning airstrikes and did not hit the pro-government troops directly.

== Aftermath ==
=== ISIL insurgency ===
On 5 November 2018, the United States's Department of Defense Inspector General determined that ISIL had evolved into "an effective clandestine" insurgency force operating largely underground in both Iraq and Syria as it lost all territory in Iraq and only possessed 1 percent of Syrian territory at the time.

The large scale simultaneous campaigns by the majority-Kurdish Syrian Democratic Forces, the Syrian government, and the Iraqi government to incrementally wrest territory from the Islamic State degraded the terror group's ability of power projection and access to the resources and manpower it once took advantage of years prior. As ISIL lost more and more territory in both Iraq and Syria and became cornered in small pockets of territory such as in al-Safa in the Syrian Desert and in the Hajin-Euphrates pocket, the veteran remnants of the group, as is seen with many organizations that utilize guerrilla warfare tactics and strategy, became increasingly dependent on insurgent strategies rather than the previous grand offensives it was able to conduct. As well as bolstering its propaganda efforts, many scattered ISIL fighters and loyalist sleeper cells melted into the local populace and continued terror bombings and attacks, prompting major counterinsurgency operations.

On 17 January 2019, the SDF – after nearly capturing all of ISIL's Euphrates pocket – said, "With the help of the (U.S.-led) coalition, we will escalate our military operations to eliminate Daesh remnants and chase down their sleeper cells," stating their readiness to wage counterinsurgency operations against the Islamic State post-campaign. On 29 January the US Director of National Intelligence Dan Coats released his Worldwide Threat Assessment, stating that ISIL "very likely will continue to pursue external attacks from Iraq and Syria against regional and Western adversaries, including the United States." With the terror group's loss of physical territory, "ISIS will seek to exploit Sunni grievances, societal instability, and stretched security forces to regain territory in Iraq and Syria in the long term," returning to its "guerrilla warfare roots while continuing to plot attacks and direct its supporters worldwide". The assessment added that it did not expect the Assad government to focus on clearing ISIL from Syria post-US withdrawal.

=== ISIL suspects and detainees ===
On 21 February 2019, an Iraqi official stated that the SDF had transferred 150 ISIL militants to Iraqi authorities under a deal involving a total of 502, making it the single largest repatriation of ISIL members thus far. On 24 February, the Iraqi Government stated that they received 13 more ISIL suspects from the SDF. Some Iraqi officials stated that all 13 were of French origin.

The Syrian Democratic Forces released 283 Syrians that were held for ISIL affiliation on 3 March. SDF authorities said the freed "have no Syrian blood on their hands," suggesting that they did not take part in any fighting. The move came after lobbying from tribal chiefs and other local officials.

On 20 April 2019, Kosovo repatriated 110 of its citizens from Syria, including 72 children, 32 women, and four men suspected of fighting for ISIL. The men were arrested upon arrival back into the country. They flew back with the help of the U.S. military before police escorted them to an army barracks near the capital, Pristina. On the same day, Bosnia announced that it had repatriated and detained a Bosnian national suspected of fighting for ISIL.

== See also ==
- Death of Abu Bakr al-Baghdadi
- Eastern Syria campaign (September–December 2017)
  - 2017 Euphrates Crossing offensive
  - 2017 Abu Kamal offensive
- Battle of Sirte (2016)
- Battle of Derna (2018)
- Battle of Mosul (2016–17)
- Battle of Marawi
- 2017 Western Iraq campaign
