= Susah =

Susah may refer to:

- Susa, Libya
- Sousse, Tunisia
- Al-Susah, Syria
