= 2018 Syrian–Turkish border clashes =

Skirmish between Turkey and AANES 31 October – 6 November 2018

2018 northern Syria border clashes
- Part of the Rojava conflict, Turkish involvement in the Syrian civil war, and the Kurdish–Turkish conflict (2015–present)
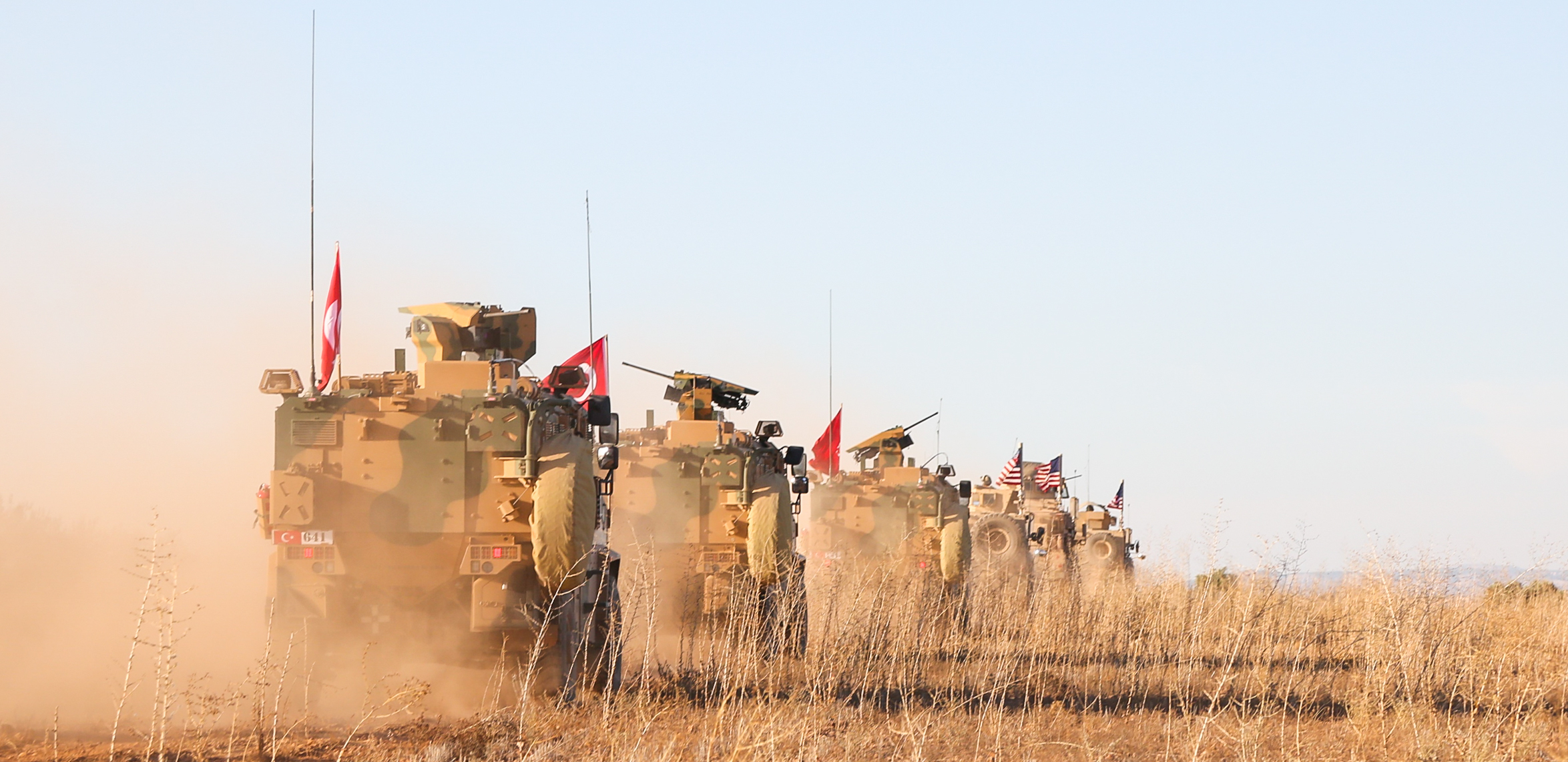
- Joint patrols by the United States Armed Forces and the Turkish Land Forces, conducted in November 2018 to prevent further clashes in northern Syria.
Date
Location
31 October – 6 November 2018
(6 days)
Northern Syria
- Northeastern Aleppo Governorate
- Northern Raqqah Governorate
- Northwestern Hasakah Governorate

Belligerents
Turkey	Autonomous Administration of North and East Syria; Euphrates Region

Commanders and leaders
Hulusi Akar (Minister of Defense)	Unknown

Units involved
	Syrian Democratic Forces; People's Protection Units (YPG); Al-Sanadid Forces; Self Defense Forces (HXP)

Casualties and losses
1 troop transport vehicle	Per SOHR: 5 killed
- Per SOHR: 1 civilian killed

The 2018 Syrian-Turkish border clashes began on 31 October 2018 when the Turkish Armed Forces began to shell People's Protection Units (YPG) positions near the cities of Kobani and Tell Abyad as well as surrounding villages. Turkey views the YPG as an extension of the outlawed Kurdistan Workers' Party (PKK), which has been leading a separatist movement and carrying out dozens of terrorist attacks in Turkey for over 40 years.

== Background ==
Journalist Ahmet S. Yayla stated that the operation by Turkey may have been carried out to relocate Hayat Tahrir al-Sham and al-Qaeda elements from Idlib in light of the demilitarization agreement between Russia and Turkey. Salih Muslim, the former co-chairman of the Democratic Union Party, stated that Russia and Turkey were plotting to send jihadists to fight against the YPG as part of the agreement. On 30 October 2018, Turkish Defense Minister Hulusi Akar said to a public gathering prior to the operation, "The plan is to remove the YPG, collect their heavy weaponry and finally allow the real Manbij people to be in full control of their city."

== Clashes ==
Locations of clashes marked within hatched circles

The Turkish military reported that four Kurdish terrorists were killed and another six were injured in the shelling of YPG positions. The Syrian Democratic Forces states that the attack had temporarily halted operations against ISIL near the Iraqi border. The Syrian Democratic Forces also stated that Turkish strikes were not limited to Kobani, but surrounding areas along the Syria–Turkey border held by Rojava. On 30 October 2018, Turkish President Recep Tayyip Erdoğan vowed to clear the Eastern Euphrates region of Kurdish separatists, while on 29 October Turkish forces had targeted YPG positions along the Euphrates river. In response to the attack, the SDF redeployed multiple units from the Deir Ez Zor region to confront the Turkish forces. In retaliation, the YPG stated that it destroyed a Turkish vehicle and released a video of the attack; however, the statement has not been acknowledged by the Turkish government. A Turkish military vehicle fired at the border station in the town of Tell Abyad, leaving one dead from the SDF's Self-Defense Forces.

With the US holding positive relations with both Turkey and the Syrian Democratic Forces, an American military delegation reportedly arrived in Tell Abyad to attempt to mediate between the two parties to attempt to resolve the conflict.

On 1 November 2018, the Turkish military targeted Kobani with helicopters as well as howitzers in preparation for an offensive and coordinated plans for an offensive with allied opposition groups based in Afrin.

Clashes continued with sporadic shelling and on 6 November Turkey targeted the town of Ras al-Ayn, a YPG supply point.

== Aftermath ==
On 21 November, United States Secretary of Defense Jim Mattis announced the U.S. will set up new observation posts along the Turkish border in northern Syria in order to reduce similar incidents between Turkish forces and Kurdish terrorist groups in the region. The endeavor is seen as a way of easing tensions between the two NATO allies and doesn't require additional U.S. troops to be deployed to Syria. The move is controversial due to U.S. lawmakers voicing concerns over mission creep in Syria in recent weeks and months. A total of three observation posts were to be set up in Tal Abyad and two in Kobani. The first Tal Abyad post was completed on 27 November. Three total observation posts were established by 12 December. "The positions were clearly marked and any force attacking them would definitely know they are attacking the United States", said a US official.

On 12 December 2018, the Turkish government announced it would begin operations against Rojava "in a few days" in an apparent rebuke of US efforts at ensuring Turkish border security in the area. In response, the Pentagon said that any unilateral military action taken in northern Syria, where US forces are operating, would be "unacceptable." However, several days later the US announced the withdrawal of their troops from Syria, after which Turkey postponed the planned attack.

On 25 December, the SDF handed over the town of Arima west of Manbij to troops of the Syrian government.

Through 27–28 December, the Manbij Military Council had invited Syrian troops to enter Manbij in order to ward off a future Turkish advance. Syrian forces gradually deployed to the surrounding countryside as American troops continued to patrol inside the city and along the contact lines with the Syrian National Army, whose units continued to deploy and mobilize along the Manbij frontier.

Following criticism of the planned withdrawal of their troops, on 6 January the US imposed the security of their Kurdish-led allies as a condition for the withdrawal.
