= Al-Shaafah =

Al-Shaafah الشعفة
- Town
- Location in Syria
- Coordinates: 34°34′04″N 40°56′03″E
- Country: Syria
- Governorate: Deir ez-Zor
- District: Abu Kamal
- Subdistrict: al-Susah

Population (2004)
  - Total: 18,956
- Time zone: UTC+3 (AST)
- City Qrya Pcode: C5183

Al-Shaafah (Arabic: الشعفة, romanized: aš-Ša'fah) is a Syrian town located in Abu Kamal District, Deir ez-Zor. According to the Syria Central Bureau of Statistics (CBS), Al-Shaafah had a population of 18,956 in the 2004 census.

The town was part of the last strip of land in Syria controlled by the Islamic State (IS). On 6 January 2019, the town was fully captured by the SDF.
