= Al-Marashidah =

Al-Marashidah ٱلْمَرَاشِدَة El Maraşada
- Town
- Location in Syria
- Coordinates: 34°30′13″N 40°55′47″E
- Country: Syria
- Governorate: Deir ez-Zor
- District: Abu Kamal
- Subdistrict: al-Susah District

Population (2004)
  - Total: 4,346
- Time zone: UTC+3 (AST)
- City Qrya Pcode: C5183

Al-Marashidah (Arabic: ٱلْمَرَاشِدَة, romanized: al-Marāšidah, Turkish: El Maraşada) is a Syrian town located in Abu Kamal District, Deir ez-Zor. According to the Syria Central Bureau of Statistics (CBS), Al-Marashidah had a population of 4,346 in the 2004 census.

The town fell under the control of the Islamic State of Iraq and the Levant in early 2014 during the Syrian Civil War. By 24 January 2019, Al-Marashidah was one of the final remaining Syrian settlements under control of the Islamic State, with the Syrian Democratic Forces fighting for control of the town. On the next day, ISIL carried out numerous suicide attacks on the SDF, in an attempt to break the siege, allowing them to recapture parts of Al-Baghuz Fawqani, to the south. On 7 February 2019, the SDF captured Al-Marashidah and other nearby areas from ISIL, completely besieging ISIL in the town of Al-Baghuz Fawqani.
