= Al-Susah =

Al-Susah ٱلسُّوسَة
- Town
- Location in Syria
- Coordinates: 34°31′15″N 40°57′46″E
- Country: Syria
- Governorate: Deir ez-Zor
- District: Abu Kamal
- Subdistrict: al-Susah

Population (2004)
  - Total: 8,797
- Time zone: UTC+3 (AST)
- City Qrya Pcode: C5186

Al-Susah (Arabic: ٱلسُّوسَة, romanized: as-Sūsah) is a Syrian town located in Abu Kamal District, Deir ez-Zor. According to the Syria Central Bureau of Statistics (CBS), Al-Susah had a population of 8,797 in the 2004 census.

== Climate ==
Climate data for Al-Susah
Month	Jan	Feb	Mar	Apr	May	Jun	Jul	Aug	Sep	Oct	Nov	Dec	Year
Mean daily maximum °C (°F)	13.8 (56.8)	16.7 (62.1)	21.1 (70.0)	26.6 (79.9)	32.5 (90.5)	38.1 (100.6)	40.5 (104.9)	40.5 (104.9)	36.3 (97.3)	30.2 (86.4)	22.0 (71.6)	15.7 (60.3)	27.8 (82.1)
Mean daily minimum °C (°F)	2.6 (36.7)	3.9 (39.0)	6.9 (44.4)	11.8 (53.2)	16.6 (61.9)	21.1 (70.0)	23.5 (74.3)	23.3 (73.9)	18.7 (65.7)	13.8 (56.8)	7.5 (45.5)	3.7 (38.7)	12.8 (55.0)
Average precipitation mm (inches)	25 (1.0)	16 (0.6)	15 (0.6)	19 (0.7)	7 (0.3)	0 (0)	0 (0)	0 (0)	0 (0)	6 (0.2)	9 (0.4)	21 (0.8)	118 (4.6)
Source: Climate Data

== Islamic State of Iraq and the Levant ==
Al-Susah was one of the last holdouts of ISIS in Syria. On January 15, 2019 Syrian Democratic Forces fully captured the town.
