= Russian intervention in the Syrian civil war =

Military operation beginning in 2015

- Part of the foreign involvement in the Syrian civil war, and the war against the Islamic State
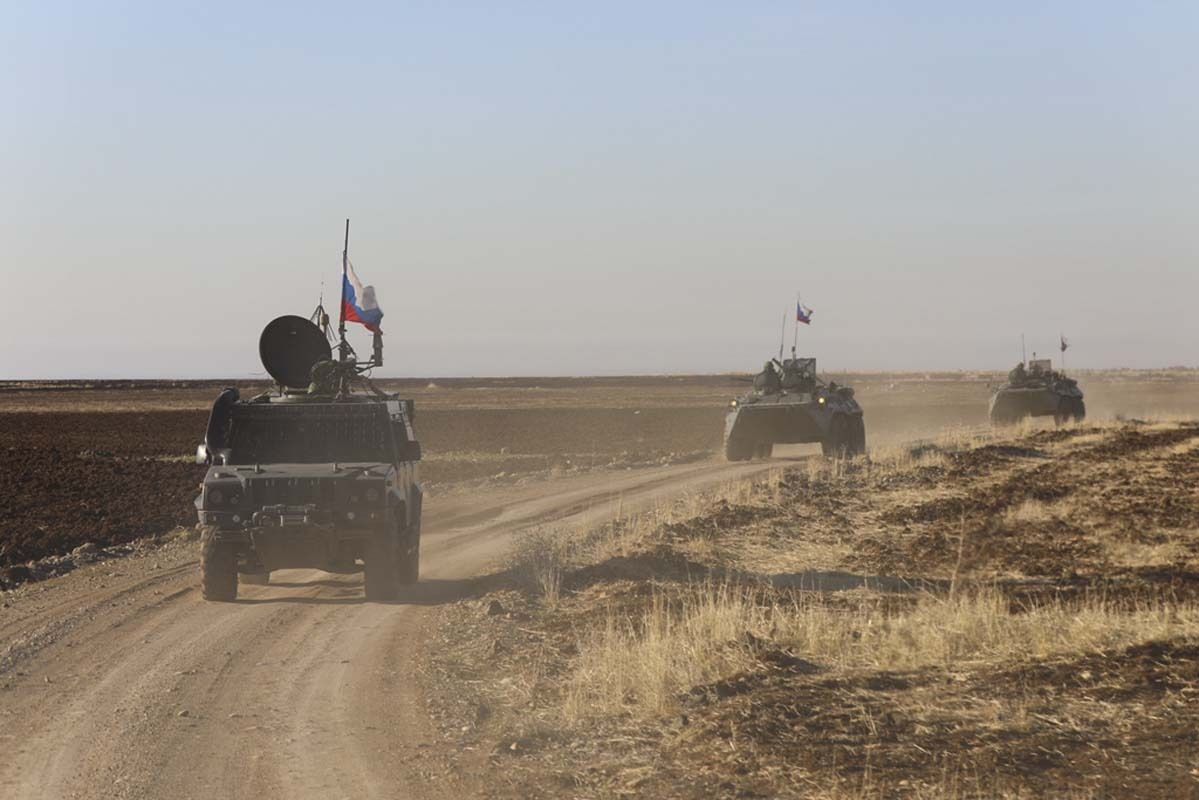
- Russian military patrol in Syria
Date	30 September 2015 – 8 December 2024 (9 years, 2 months, 1 week and 1 day)
Location	Syria
Result	Syrian opposition victory

Belligerents
Russia; Iran; Syria; Humanitarian support: Armenia Syrian Democratic Forces	Syrian Salvation Government: Hay'at Tahrir al-Sham (2017–2025); (Syrian opposition) Syrian Interim Government: (Syrian opposition) Free Syrian Army; (Syrian opposition) Syrian National Army	Al-Qaeda: Al-Nusra Front (2013–2017); Jund al-Aqsa (2017–2018); Guardians of Religion (2018–2025); Islamic State

Commanders and leaders
(Russia) Vladimir Putin (Russia) Sergei Shoigu (Russia) Valery Gerasimov Others: (Russia) Viktor Bondarev (Russia) Sergey Rudskoy (Chief of Gen Staff. Ops. Dept.) (Russia) Aleksandr Dvornikov (September 2015 – June 2016) (Russia) Alexander Zhuravlyov (July–December 2016) (Russia) Andrey Kartapolov (December 2016 – March 2017) (Russia) Sergey Surovikin (March–December 2017) (Russia) Alexander Zhuravlyov (December 2017 – September 2018) (Russia) Sergey Kuralenko (September–October 2018) (Russia) Aleksandr Lapin (October 2018 – January 2019) (Russia) Sergey Surovikin (January–April 2019) (Russia) Andrey Serdyukov (April–September 2019) (Russia) Aleksandr Chaiko (September 2019 – November 2020) (Russia) Sergey Kuzovlev (November 2020 – February 2021) (Russia) Aleksandr Chaiko (February–June 2021) (Russia) Yevgeny Nikiforov (June–October 2021) (Russia) Roman Berdnikov (October 2021 – September 2022) (Russia) Andrey Serdyukov (September 2022 – November 2023) (Russia) Sergey Kisel (November 2023 – November 2024) (Russia) Valery Asapov † (Russia) Vyacheslav Gladich †	Ahmed al-Sharaa Others: Abdullah al-Muhaysini (Top Sharia judge of the Army of Conquest) Abu Jaber Sheikh (Shura Council head of Hay'at Tahrir al-Sham) Salahuddin Shishani † (Hay'at Tahrir al-Sham top military commander) Abu Salman al-Belarusi † (Leader of Malhama Tactical) Abu Ubeidah al-Kansafra † (Top military commander of Hay'at Tahrir al-Sham) 12 unknown Al-Nusra Front military commanders †; (Syrian opposition) Abdurrahman Mustafa Others: (Syrian opposition) Basil Zamo † (1st Coastal Division Chief of Staff) (Syrian opposition) Abu Yahia al-Hamawi (Leader of Ahrar al-Sham) (Syrian opposition) Nimr Al-Shukri † (Top military commander of Ahrar al-Sham) Zahran Alloush † (Emir of Jaysh al-Islam) Abu Rida al-Turkistani † (Leader Turkistan Islamic Party in Syria)	Abu Hajer al-Homsi † Others: Abu Abdollah Jabal † (al-Nusra Front senior commander in Aleppo) Ahmad al-Ghizai † (al-Nusra Front security service chief) Khalid al-Aruri † (Guardians of Religion leader) Abu Humam al-Shami (Guardians of Religion leader) Sami al-Oraydi (Guardians of Religion senior official) Saif al-Adel (Guardians of Religion leader) Abu 'Abd al-Karim al-Masri (Guardians of Religion senior leader) Sari Shihab † (Guardians of Religion senior leader) Abu Adnan al-Homsi † (Guardians of Religion logistics and equipment commander); (Islamic State) Abu Bakr al-Baghdadi † (Leader until 27 October 2019) Others: Abu Mohammad al-Adnani † (Spokesperson) Abu Omar al-Shishani † (Senior commander in Syria) Gulmurod Khalimov † (Minister of war in Syria) Abu Musab al-Masri † (Minister of war in Syria) Abu Muhammad al-Shimali † (Senior leader)

Units involved
Russian Armed Forces: Units: Russian Aerospace Forces; Russian Air Force; Russian Navy; Black Sea Fleet; Caspian Flotilla; Main Intelligence Directorate; Special Operations Forces; Military Police; Foreign Intelligence Service; Zaslon; Federal Security Service; Spetsgruppa "K" advisors; Wagner Group; Interbrigades; (Chechnya) Kadyrovites; Thorbrandr; Islamic Republic of Iran Armed Forces: Units: IRGC; Basij; Iranian Army Armed Forces of Armenia: 12th Peacekeeping Brigade	Hay'at Tahrir al-Sham (2017–present) Units: Liwa al-Haqq Jund al-Aqsa (2015–17) Ajnad al-Sham (2015–17) Sham Legion Malhama Tactical (since 2017); (Syria) Free Syrian Army Units: Levant Front; Free Idlib Army; Mountain Hawks Brigade; 13th Division; Northern Division; Jaish al-Izzah; Jaysh al-Nasr; Harakat Nour al-Din al-Zenki (2015–19); Ahrar ash-Sham; Syrian Turkmen Brigades; Jaysh al-Islam	Al Qaeda Units: al-Nusra Front (2015–17) Turkistan Islamic Party in Syria Guardians of Religion; Military of IS

Strength
Troop strength 20,000 personnel (Note: Including Military Police and Wagner PMC.): 6,000 ground forces personnel; Equipment: Naval ships 2 Vishnya-class intelligence ship 4 Improved Kilo-class submarines 1 Slava-class cruiser Kuznetsov aircraft carrier battlegroup 1 Kuznetsov-class aircraft carrier 1 Kirov-class battlecruiser 2 Udaloy-class destroyers support vessels Strategic bombers 14 Tu-22M3 6 Tu-95MSM 5 Tu-160 Tactical bombers 12 Su-24M2 8 Su-34 Attack bombers 4 Su-25SM Fighter aircraft 4 Su-27SM 4 Su-30SM 4 Su-35S 4 MiG-29SMT 4 Su-57 Reconnaissance aircraft A-50U Il-20M1 Tu-214R Attack helicopter 12 Mi-24P/35M 6 Mi-28N 4 Ka-52 Utility helicopter 4 Mi-8AMTSh UAV Orlan-10 Forpost Ground arms and equipment UGV Uran-6 IMV Iveco Rys' SRBM (presumed) 2 9K720 Iskander (SS-26) missile launchers SAM 3 SA-22, other anti-aircraft and anti-missile weapons, including S-400, S-300VM, and Vityaz (S-350E) (unconfirmed officially)	Hay'at Tahrir al-Sham: ca. 31,000; Free Syrian Army: 45,000–60,000 fighters (disputed); Ahrar al-Sham: 10,000–21,000	Islamic State: 30,000–100,000 fighters

Casualties and losses
(Russia) 197 servicemen killed 346 Wagner PMC killed (confirmed by names only) Equipment: 14 aircraft lost: 2 Su-24 lost 1 Su-25 lost 1 MiG-29K lost 1 Su-30SM lost 1 Su-33 lost 1 An-26 lost 1 Ilyushin Il-20 lost 2 Mi-8AMTsh lost 1 Mi-28N lost 2 Mi-35 lost 1 Ka-52 lost	6,273 killed (according to SOHR)	6,244 killed (according to SOHR)
- 4,431–6,522 civilians killed (according to Airwars); 8,763 civilians killed (according to SOHR) 21,280 total killed in Russian Military Operations (Per SOHR)

From September 2015 until December 2024, Russia conducted a military intervention in the Syrian civil war, following a request by Ba'athist Syria under Bashar al-Assad for support against the Syrian opposition and Islamic State (IS). The Russian Armed Forces' first conflict beyond the former Soviet Union since its dissolution; analysts pointed to strategic aims including limiting United States influence in the Middle East, access to the Eastern Mediterranean, and military capacity for other theaters of the Middle East, such as the Red Sea and Libya.

Pre-intervention, government forces controlled 26% of Syria. Russian involvement had included diplomatic support for Assad and billions of US dollars' worth of materiel for the Syrian Arab Armed Forces. The intervention began with airstrikes focused on Free Syrian Army militias. Russian ground support included special forces, advisors and private military companies like the Wagner Group. Russia declared the strikes a "war against terrorism", but used scorched earth methods against civilians. Putin defined Russia's goals as "stabilising the legitimate power in Syria and creating the conditions for political compromise", while a speculated aim was capturing territories from US-UK-Arab-backed militias. Syrian territory under Assad's control shrank from 26% to 17% by 2017.

By January 2017, the Russian Air Force was claimed to have carried out 19,160 air combat missions, delivering 71,000 strikes. In 2016, over 80% of strikes targeted opposition militias fighting IS. (Note: Sources: "'More than 90%' of Russian airstrikes in Syria have not targeted Isis, US says". The Guardian. 7 October 2015. Archived from the original on 8 March 2022.; Casagrande, Genevieve (13 February 2016). "The Russian Air Campaign in Aleppo". Institute for the Study of War. Archived from the original on 26 April 2022.; Stubbs, Jack (21 October 2015). "Four-fifths of Russia's Syria strikes don't target Islamic State: Reuters analysis". Reuters. Archived from the original on 9 January 2022.; "Syria/Russia: Strategy Targeted Civilian Infrastructure". Human Rights Watch. 15 October 2020. Archived from the original on 7 March 2022.; Beauchamp, Zack (30 September 2015). "Russia says it's bombing ISIS in Syria. It's actually bombing their enemies". Vox News. Archived from the original on 20 July 2022.; Taddonio, Patrice (11 March 2022). "11 Years into the Syrian Conflict, Explore its Evolution, Toll & Putin's Role". PBS Frontline. Archived from the original on 28 March 2022.) The intervention saw concrete gains for the Assad government from late 2016 to 2020: the recapture of Aleppo from the Army of Conquest, and Palmyra and Deir ez-Zor from IS in 2017, the 2018 Southern offensive, and the North-Western offensive. In December 2017, Russia announced its troops would be deployed to Syria permanently.

The air campaign until 2018 was characterized by three ranges. Long Range Aviation and the Black Sea Fleet used Kh-101 and Kalibr missiles respectively. Mid-range strikes used Su-24 and Su-34 tactical bombers. Close air support included Su-25s and Mil Mi-24 helicopters. By April 2018, Russian airstrikes reportedly killed over 7,700 civilians, about a quarter of them children, apart from 4,749 opposition fighters and 4,893 IS fighters. International and human rights bodies accused Russia of committing war crimes, targeting civilians, hospitals, schools, carpet bombing, (Note: Sources: Borshchevskaya 2022 pp 69–88; Reinl, James (19 September 2019). "Russia blasted at UN for 'carpet bombing' Syria". Aljazeera. Archived from the original on 26 March 2022.; Shield, Ralph (2022). "Chapter 10". In Jackson, Colin; Haun, Phil; Schultz, Tim (eds.). Air Power in the Age of Primacy: Air Warfare Since the Cold War. New York: Cambridge University Press. pp. 249–253. ISBN 978-1-108-83922-8.; Oloruntoba, Samuel Ojo; Falola, Toyin, eds. (2021). The Palgrave Handbook of Africa and the Changing Global Order. Cham, Switzerland: Palgrave Macmillan. p. 705. doi:10.1007/978-3-030-77481-3. ISBN 978-3-030-77480-6. S2CID 244495705.; McFaul, Michael (2018). "Epilogue: Trump and Putin". From Cold War to Hot Peace: The Inside Story of Russia and America. New York, New York: Houghton Mifflin Harcourt. ISBN 978-0-544-71624-7.) and double tap strikes on relief workers. Weapons used included unguided bombs, cluster bombs, incendiaries similar to white phosphorus and thermobaric weapons.

Countries with ties to Russia, as well as Israel, Jordan and Egypt, either voiced support or stayed neutral. The US, UK and France, as well as Turkey and most Gulf states, condemned the Russian intervention, Russian war crimes, and complicity with the Ba'athist Syria's war crimes. The US imposed economic sanctions against Russia.

In November 2024, amid the dramatically escalated Russo–Ukrainian war, a renewal of Russian airstrikes failed to halt sweeping Syrian opposition offensives against government forces. Russia began to withdraw forces, by then consisting of special forces, base security and an aviation unit, and the fall of the Assad regime followed in December.

== Background and preparation phase ==
The Syrian civil war has been waged since 2011 between multiple opposition (anti-Assad) groups and the government as well, including their local and foreign support bases. Since 2014, much Syrian territory had been claimed by the Islamic State of Iraq and the Levant (IS) an entity internationally recognized as a terrorist organization. In the north-west of the country, the main opposition factions included the Revolutionary Command Council and the Islamic Army of Conquest coalition. Free Syrian militias that operated under the joint RCC command centre that answered to the Syrian Interim Government were being trained, vetted and equipped by United States and allies. Since September 2014, the U.S.-led CJTF coalition had begun direct intervention in Syria as part of its war against IS. The Wall Street Journal reported in January 2015 that coalition airstrikes were unsuccessful in slowing IS advances in Syria.

Following his successful annexation of Crimea from Ukraine and the temporary freezing of the war in Donbas, Vladimir Putin turned his attention to Syria in 2015. Russian intelligence reports estimated that Assad government forces effectively controlled a meagre 10% of Syrian territory. Ba'athist forces were steadily losing cities and towns to rebel forces, and the survival of the Assad regime appeared increasingly uncertain. Under the advice of Chief of Staff Valery Gerasimov and Russian military elites, Putin launched a full-scale military intervention of Syria to prevent the fall of their ally, Bashar al-Assad, and Syria's subsequent entry into the Western sphere of influence. Other objectives included showcasing Russian military prowess by guarding its naval port in Tartus and project Russia's expanding influence across West Asia, North Africa, Europe and Eastern Mediterranean. To avoid a repeat of the disastrous Invasion of Afghanistan, Russia implemented an irregular warfare strategy, sub-contracting ground operations to Syrian Armed Forces, allied foreign militias and Russian PMCs like Wagner. However, Russia would retain control over air operations.

The Assad regime had lost vast swathes of territories by 2015, including the governates of Idlib, Aleppo, Raqqa, Deir Az Zor, Al-Hasakah, Deraa and Quneitra. Assad's forces had also been pushed out of the Hama, Damascus and Homs provinces by the Syrian opposition. According to Russian and Syrian officials, in July 2015, Assad made a formal request to Russia for air strikes combating international terrorism, while laying out Syria's military problems. According to media reports with reference to anonymous sources, after a series of major setbacks suffered by the Syrian government forces in the first half of 2015, Russia and Syria agreed to intensify Russian involvement. Qasem Soleimani, commander of Iran's Quds Force visited Moscow in July to work out the details of the joint campaign (Soleimani's visit was denied by Russian officials).

In August 2015, Russia began to send Russian-operated warplanes, T-90 tanks and artillery, as well as combat troops to an airbase near the port city of Latakia in Syria. On 26 August 2015, a treaty was signed between the two countries which permitted Russia to use Syria's Hmeimim airport free of charge, indefinitely. Ratified by Russia's parliament in October 2016, it also grants Russian personnel and their family members jurisdictional immunity and other privileges as envisaged by Vienna Convention on Diplomatic Relations. In September 2015, warships of Russia's Black Sea Fleet reached the eastern Mediterranean.

At the end of September, a joint information centre in Baghdad was set up by Iran, Iraq, Russia and Syria to coordinate their operations against ISIL (in the newsmedia the centre is also referred to as "Joint Operations Room in Baghdad known as the 4 + 1" implying the Lebanese Shia militia Hezbollah, in addition to the 4 states). According to Russian foreign minister Sergey Lavrov's statement made in mid-October 2015, prior to the start of its operations in Syria, Russia invited the United States to join the Baghdad-based information centre but received what he called an "unconstructive" response. According to Alexander Yakovenko, Ambassador of Russia to the United Kingdom, the Russian government received a similar rebuttal from the UK government. In late December 2015, Turkey's president Recep Erdogan said that he had declined Putin's offer to join this alliance as he "cannot sit alongside a president [Assad] whose legitimacy is distrustful[sic]."

On 30 September 2015, the upper house of the Russian Federal Assembly, the Federation Council, unanimously granted Putin's request to deploy the Russian Air Force in Syria. On the same day, the Russian representative to the joint information centre arrived at the U.S. embassy in Baghdad and requested that United States forces in the targeted area in Syria leave immediately. An hour later, Russian aircraft based in government-held territory launched airstrikes against opposition strongholds in Homs and Hama governorates. On the same day, Russian Orthodox Church officially praised the Federal Assembly's decision, depicting Putin's military intervention as a "holy war against terrorism".

Before and after the operation in Syria, Russian analysts said that Russia's military build-up in Syria was aimed inter alia at ending the de facto political and diplomatic isolation that the West had imposed on Putin after his 2014 invasion of Ukraine. At the onset of Russian military intervention in September 2015, the Assad regime merely controlled about a quarter of Syrian territories and was widely perceived to be heading towards an imminent collapse.

=== Prevention of Qatar–Turkey pipeline ===
One of the drivers behind Russia's military involvement in defence of Assad's clan in Syria was preventing any gas supplies to Europe and Turkey that would compete with Russian supplies. In an October 2016 TV interview, General Leonid Ivashov said that Russia's engagement in the conflict would allow it to block proposed pipelines between the Middle East and Europe, and thus ensure the dominance of Gazprom. In 2024 after fall of Assad Russian journalist Irina Alksnis, writing for RIA, justified Russia's intervention nearly in the same words, listing "ruining Western plans of anti-Russian games in the energy sector" among the benefits.

=== Countering Revolutions ===
Another factor that motivated Putin to launch the intervention was his fear of massive protests within Russia. Putin accused the West of backing "color revolutions" to destabilize the region, and believed these revolutions could be replicated via a massive anti-government uprising in Russia, leading to his downfall. The downfall of the pro-Russian Gaddafi regime during the 2011 Libyan Revolution had deeply upset Putin. His apprehensions were further confirmed by the 2011-2013 Russian protests. In 2014, the Ukrainian Revolution of Dignity ousted the pro-Russian regime of Viktor Yanukovich. Putin reacted by starting the Russo-Ukrainian War and annexing Crimea, a move which triggered massive international sanctions. In the face of deteriorating relations with the West and suspicious of another successful revolution in Syria, Putin intervened to prevent the collapse of the Assad regime.

== Operations by Russian military forces ==
=== September–October 2015 ===
The first series of air strikes took place on 30 September 2015 around the cities of Homs and Hama, targeting Syrian opposition forces. Russian warplanes attacked rebel positions "in al-Rastan, Talbiseh and Zafaraniya in Homs province; Al-Tilol al-Hmer in Quneitra province; Aydoun, a village on the outskirts of the town of Salamiyah; Deer Foul, between Hama and Homs; and the outskirts of Salamiyah". Most of the initial airstrikes targeted positions of the Chechen fighters, Islamic Front's Jaysh al-Islam (Army of Islam), and Free Syrian Army. Ali Abdullah Ayoub, military chief of Ba'athist Syrian armed forces, portrayed Russian airstrikes as part of military operations against "terrorists", a term used in Ba'athist state propaganda to refer to all armed opposition groups.

While Russian officials falsely claimed that the strikes were solely directed against IS bases, the location of bombings were in Homs and Hama provinces controlled by opposition militias fighting IS. Syrian civil society activists asserted that none of the strikes were against IS, but solely the rebel-held civilian areas, killing 36 civilians, including many children. US Secretary of State John Kerry denounced the targeting of opposition areas during a session with the UN Security Council. Defence Secretary Ash Carter denounced Russian attacks on opposition-held territories as "doomed to fail."

Russia launched its military intervention with extensive air strikes across Syria, targeting the strongholds of Syrian opposition factions, such as the Free Syrian Army. Violations Documentation Centre (VCD) reported that more than 43 civilians, including nine children and seven women, were killed in Russian airstrikes in the central Homs region on September 30, the first day of Russian aerial bombings. VCD also documented the usage of two vacuum bombs and stated that the Russian warplanes mostly bombed civilian areas in villages and towns, including residential buildings and food distribution centres.

According to Hezbollah media outlet Al Mayadeen, the Saudi/Turkish-backed Army of Conquest around Jisr ash-Shugour was bombed on 1 October by Russian planes; at least 30 airstrikes were carried out. Al-Mayadeen outlet also claimed that on same day, another series of Russian airstrikes targeted the Tabqa airbase, which was under the control of the Islamic State organization in the Raqqa region.

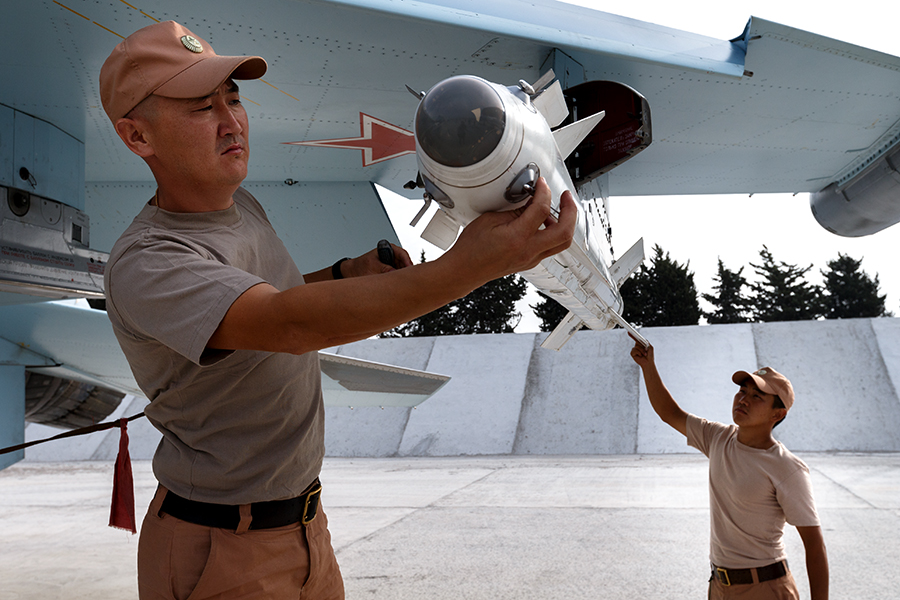
Preparation of an aircraft of the Russian Air Force for combat sorties in Syria.

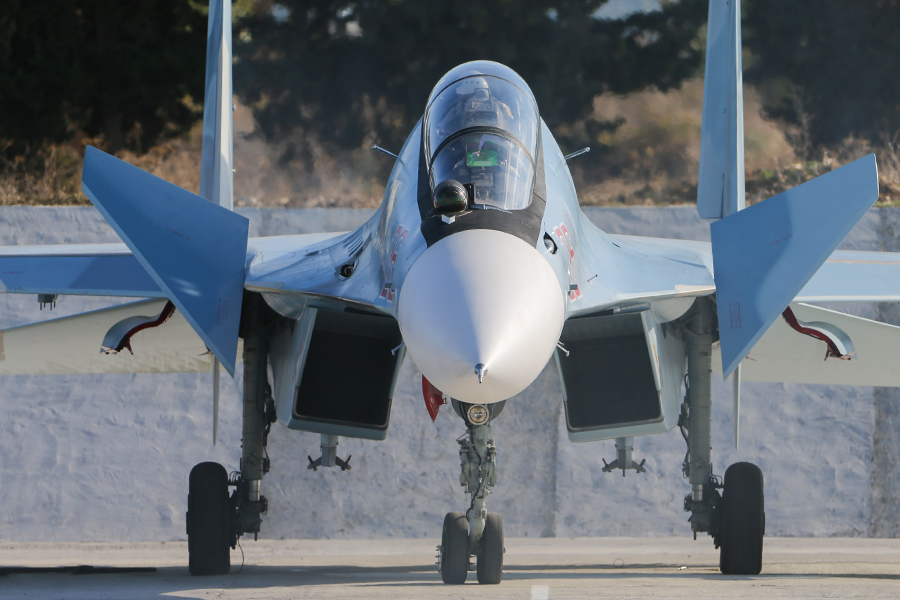
Russian multirole fighter Su-30 at the Hmeymim air base.

On 3 October, reports indicated that Hezbollah and Iranian fighters were preparing major ground offensives to be coordinated with Russian airstrikes. According to CNN, the Russian defence ministry said its soldiers bombed nine ISIL positions near the group's de facto capital in Raqqa. At least 11 were killed in a double strike by Russia in Syria's Idlib province, according to opposition groups.

Russian Navy produced a massive cruise missiles attack from the Caspian Sea on Islamic State targets in Syria

On the morning of 7 October 2015, according to Russian officials, four warships from the Russian Navy's Caspian Flotilla launched 26 3M-14T cruise missiles from Kalibr-NK systems that hit 11 targets within Syrian territory. The missiles passed through Iranian and Iraqi airspace in order to reach their targets at a distance of well over about 1,500 kilometres (930 miles). The same day, Syrian ground forces were reported to carry out an offensive under Russian air cover. According to CNN citing unnamed United States military and intelligence officials, 4 of 26 cruise missiles on 8 October crashed in Iran, well before reaching their targets in Syria. Russia said all of its missiles hit their targets. Iran also denied any missiles had crashed on its territory. The Iranian defence ministry dismissed the CNN reports as Western "psychological warfare".

On 8 October 2015, the number of air raids increased significantly up to over 60 sorties a day, a tempo maintained for the next two days. The Russian defense ministry announced on 9 October that up to sixty ISIL targets were hit in the previous 24 hours, killing 300 militants in the most intense strikes so far. One raid targeted a Liwa al-Haqq base in the Raqqa Governorate using KAB-500KR precision-guided bombs, in which reportedly two senior ISIL commanders and up to 200 militants were killed, despite the lack of any connection between al-Haqq and ISIL. Another destroyed a former prison near Aleppo used by ISIL as a base and munitions depot, killing scores of militants. Rebel training sites in the Latakia and Idlib provinces were reportedly hit as well. Meanwhile, ISIL militants made advances in the Aleppo area on 9 October, seizing several villages in what the Associated Press called a "lightning attack". The attacks were unencumbered by either Russian or United States-led coalition airstrikes. The ISIL advance came at the expense of rebel groups also targeted by Russian and Syrian forces. In mid-October 2015, a joint Russian-Syrian-Iranian-Hezbollah offensive targeting rebels in Aleppo went ahead.

According to pro-opposition citizen journalist group Raqqa Is Being Slaughtered Silently, Russia lied about targeting ISIL in the early airstrikes and missiles around Raqqa. Between 17 September and 13 October they counted 36 Russian strikes against only 2 ISIL targets (with 4 ISIL deaths) and 22 civilian targets (with 70 civilian deaths plus injuries) included hospitals, a fire hall, at least one school and a highway fueling station.

=== November 2015 ===
On 17 November 2015, in the wake of the Russian jet crash over Sinai and the Paris attacks, according to the Russian defence minister's public report to the president of Russia Vladimir Putin, Russia employed the Russia-based Tu-160, Tu-95MSM, and Tu-22M3 long-range strategic bombers firing air-launched cruise missiles to hit what he said were the IS targets in Raqqa, Deir ez-Zor as well as targets in the provinces of Aleppo and Idlib. The Russian minister of defence said that, pursuant to Putin's orders, the Russian aviation group - which, at the time, comprised more than 50 aircraft - begun further intensifying their campaign. In addition, Putin said he had issued orders for the cruiser Moskva that had been in the eastern Mediterranean since the start of the Russian operations to "work as with an ally", with the French naval group led by flagship Charles de Gaulle that had been on its way to the eastern Mediterranean since early November. The following day, according to the Russian Defence ministry, strikes by long-range bombers firing cruise missiles in the same areas in Syria continued. The mass cruise missile strikes carried out against ISIS in Deir Ezzor province on 20 November resulted in the death of more than 600 militants according to the ministry.

A Russian Sukhoi Su-24 strike aircraft was shot down by a Turkish Air Force F-16 on 24 November 2015. The pilot was shot and killed by Syrian rebels while descending by parachute, and the weapon systems officer was later rescued by Russian forces. A Russian marine was injured during the rescue operation and later died en route to a medical center. In the video the rebels shout "Allah Akbar" over the dead body of a Russian pilot. According to Turkey's statements presented to the UN Security Council, two planes, whose nationalities were unknown to them at the time, violated Turkish airspace over the Yayladağı province up to 2.19 km (1.36 mi) for 17 seconds. According to Turkey, the planes disregarded multiple warnings and were subsequently fired upon by Turkish F-16s patrolling the area. After the Turkish fire, one plane left Turkish airspace and the other crashed into Syrian territory. The Russian Ministry of Defense denied violating Turkey's airspace, stating they had been flying south of the Yayladağı province, providing two maps showing two different stated routes (one including turns and maneuvers described as "impossible").

Before the incident, Russian military jets had repeatedly violated Turkish airspace, causing political tension. A month before the shootdown, on 17 October, the Turkish prime minister warned that Turkey would not hesitate to shoot down airplanes violating its airspace.

Russia responded by announcing the deployment of additional air defense weapons in the area and would provide its bombers with fighter jet escorts. On 26 November 2015, deployment of S-300 and S-400 anti-aircraft systems was reported by Russia's official news media, to Latakia and on board the cruiser Moskva. At around the same time, Russia announced that it was preparing for more jet fighters and a new Russian combat brigade to be stationed at Shayrat Airbase in Homs once in service for aiding the Syrian government troops in their ongoing offensive against ISIL.

On 29 November 2015, Russian aircraft were reported to have struck targets in the Syrian Idlib province, including the town of Ariha that had been captured by the Army of Conquest 6 months prior, causing multiple casualties on the ground. Other targets hit included the Turkistan Islamic Party's office in Jisr al-Shughur and a relief office of Ahrar ash-Sham group in the town of Saraqib.

=== December 2015 – February 2016 ===
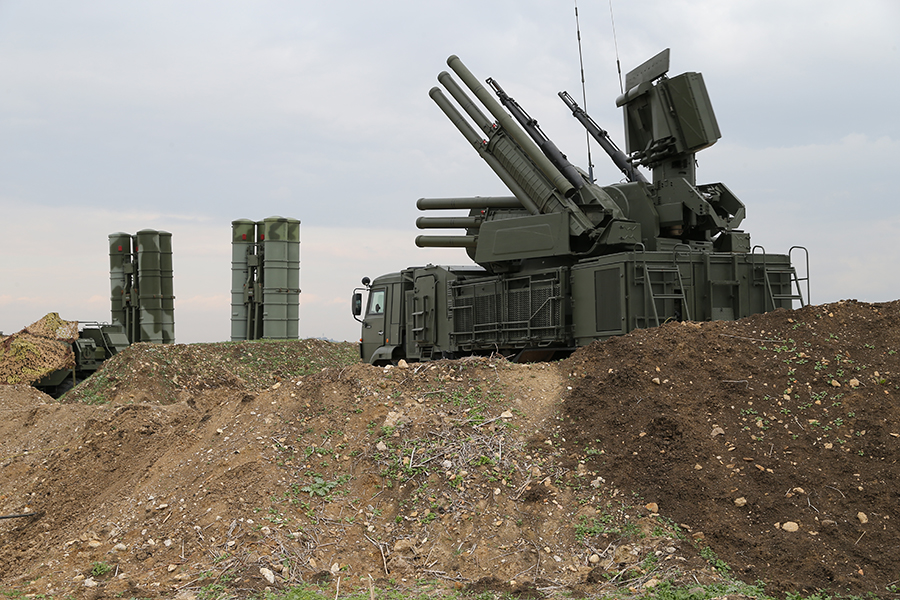
A Russian air defence battery in December 2015. A Pantsir-S1 close-range defense system and two launch vehicles for S-400 long-distance flight missiles at Latakia.

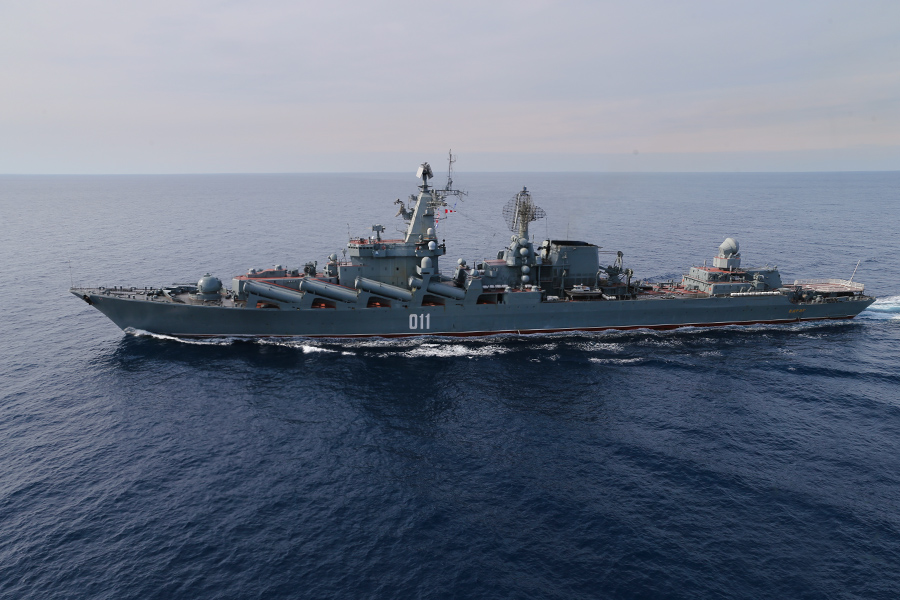
The cruiser Moskva operating as part of the Russian Navy task group providing air defence cover in the Eastern Mediterranean; January 2016

On 1 December 2015, The Times, citing local sources and news media, reported that Russia was preparing to expand its military operations in Syria by opening the al-Shayrat airbase near the city of Homs, already home to Russian attack helicopters and a team that had arrived about a month prior.

On 8 December, the Russian defence minister announced that a Kilo-class submarine, Rostov-on-Don, had launched 3M14K cruise missiles while submerged, against ISIL targets in Raqqa Governorate, the first such strike from the Mediterranean Sea. He also reported to the president that pursuant to Putin's order, since 5 December the Russian military had intensified airstrikes in Syria: it was reported that over the three days, Russian aircraft, including Tu-22M3 strategic bombers, had performed over 300 sorties engaging over 600 targets of different type.

On 11 December, in a televised meeting at the Defence ministry Vladimir Putin ordered the military in Syria to "act as tough as possible. Any target that poses a threat to Russian military grouping or ground infrastructure has to be destroyed immediately." He also appeared to suggest that the Russian military was now supporting the anti-government Free Syrian Army forces; however, the Kremlin spokesman later said that Russia was only supplying weapons to "the legitimate authorities of the Syrian Arab Republic".

On 16 December, Russia's Defence minister Sergey Shoigu speaking to the members of the State Duma behind closed doors, mentioned a possible option of the Russian forces "reaching the Euphrates" in Syria.

On 19 December, Putin commended the performance of the Russian armed forces in Syria; he said that "so far not all of our capabilities have been used" and that "more military means" might be employed there "if deemed necessary".

On 21 December, the longest offensive of the year since Russian forces got involved yielded important gains. According to pro-government sources and social media accounts, these included the recapture of the strategic Khanasser–Ithriya Highway from ISIL and capture of the main rebel strongholds of Al-Hader and Khan Tuman, cutting the Aleppo–Damascus highway and leaving them in control of three-quarters of the southern Aleppo countryside.

On 25 December 2015, Chief of the Main Operational Directorate of the General Staff of the Russian Armed Forces Lt. Gen. Sergey Rudskoy said that since 30 September 2015 Russian air force had conducted 5,240 sorties in Syria, including 145 sorties by long-range aviation. On 27 December 2015, Chief Commander of the Russian Aerospace Force Col. Gen. Viktor Bondarev stated that Russian pilots had not once attacked civilian targets in Syria.

On 30 December 2015, heavy fighting was reported as the Syrian government forces backed by Russian air strikes advanced into the southern city of Al-Shaykh Maskin, which had been held by the rebel Southern Front since the First Battle of Al-Shaykh Maskin in December 2014. The Syrian government's offensive operation that began 28 December 2015 and concluded by the end of January 2016 was said to be their first major assault in southern Syria since Russia joined the fight.

In early January 2016, regional diplomats who had assumed Moscow had an understanding with Jordan and Israel not to extend into their sphere of influence were reported to be surprised by the growing Russian role in Syria's south; so were rebels from Syria's Southern Front alliance whose forces were directly supplied by the Military Operations Command, an operations room staffed by Arab and Western military forces, including the US.

On 9 January 2016, Syrian Observatory for Human Rights reported that Russian air strikes in the northwestern town of Maarrat al-Nu'man had killed about 60 persons, including 23 members of the Nusra Front.

In January 2016, the cruiser Varyag was deployed off Syria's shore replacing sister ship Moskva and was named flagship of the Russian naval task force positioned in the eastern Mediterranean.

On 14 January 2016, the Russian defence ministry said that the first joint bombing mission had been performed by Russian air force Su-25 fighters and Syrian air force MiG-29 aircraft.

Russia's role was said to be essential in the government's capture, on 24 January 2016, of the town of Rabia, the last major town held by rebels in western Latakia province. The capture of Rabia, part of the government's Latakia offensive, was said to threaten rebel supply lines from Turkey.

At the end of January 2016, Russia, for the first time, deployed four Su-35S fighter jets, presumably equipped with the Khibiny electronic countermeasures (ECM) systems, to the Khmeimim base. On 1 February the Russian defence ministry said the aircraft had begun conducting missions in Syria.

A Russian military adviser died in a Syrian hospital on 1 February after suffering severe wounds when a Syrian army training center in Homs Province was shelled. Speaking shortly after the formal start of the UN-mediated Geneva Syria peace talks on 1 February, Russian foreign minister Sergei Lavrov said Russia would not stop its air strikes until Russia truly defeated "such terrorist organisations as Jabhat al-Nusra and ISIL″.

In early February 2016, intensive Russian strikes contributed to the success of the Syrian army and its allies' offensive operation to the northwest of Aleppo that severed a major rebel supply line to Turkey.

=== March 2016 – mid-October 2016 ===
On 1 March 2016, Russian foreign minister Sergey Lavrov said that the truce, formally referred to as a "cessation of hostilities", that had been in effect from 27 February 2016 at 00:00 (Damascus time), was largely holding and becoming more stable. According to the state–run RIA Novosti's report of 1 March 2016, all the planes at the Russian Khmeimim base had been grounded for four days.

On 1 March, the Russian defense ministry said it had deployed to the Khmeimim base additional radars and drones: three sets of surveillance equipment which included drones and two radar stations.

On 14 March 2016, Russian president Vladimir Putin announced that the mission which he had set for the Russian military in Syria was "on the whole accomplished" and ordered withdrawal of the "main part" of the Russian forces from Syria. The move was announced on the day when peace talks on Syria resumed in Geneva. The Russian leader, however, did not give a deadline for the completion of the withdrawal. He also said that both Russian military bases in Syria (naval base in Tartus and airbase in Khmeimim) will continue to operate in "routine mode", as the Russian servicemen there will be engaged in monitoring the ceasefire regime.

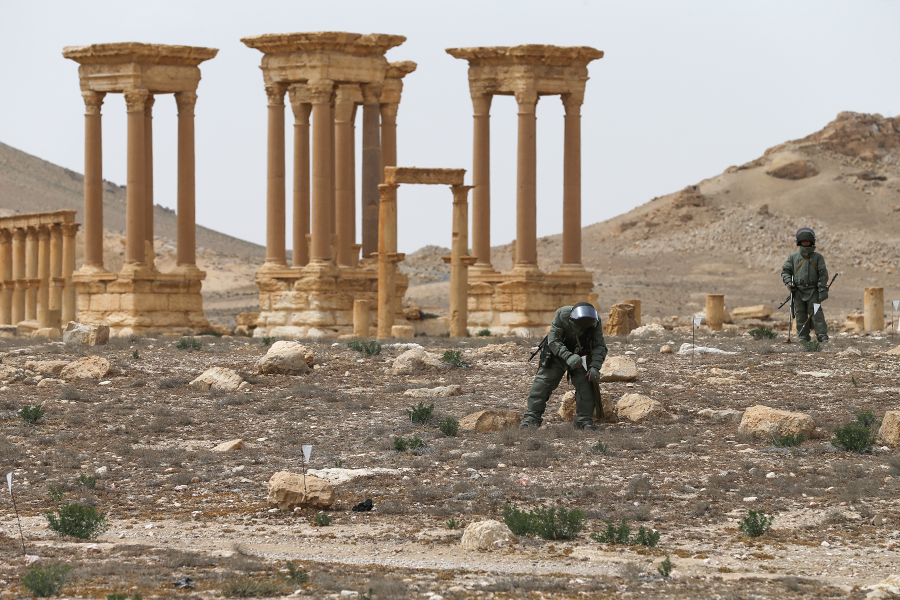
Russian sappers conducting demining operations in areas captured by Syrian government forces during the March 2016 Palmyra offensive against IS. (Photo released by Russian Defence Ministry)

In mid-March 2016, intensive operations by the Russian forces resumed to support the Syrian government's bid to recapture the city of Tadmur that includes the UNESCO World Heritage Site of Palmyra, which were fully recaptured from ISIS on 27 March. Following the recapture of the city, Russian de-mining teams engaged in the clearing of mines planted by ISIS in the ancient site of Palmyra.

In early May 2016, news media reported that Russian ground forces had set up what Jane's Information Group called a ″forward operating base″ (officially a base for the mining crews) just to the west of the city of Tadmur, and installed an air-defence system to protect the site.

In mid-May 2016, Stratfor reported that a Russian air base was attacked and four Russian attack helicopters, 20 supply trucks and one Syrian Mig-25 were destroyed. However, United States media cited intelligence community sources as believing the destruction was caused by an accidental fuel tank explosion, that the Stratfor analysis was wrong and that there were no indications of an ISIS attack on the airport.

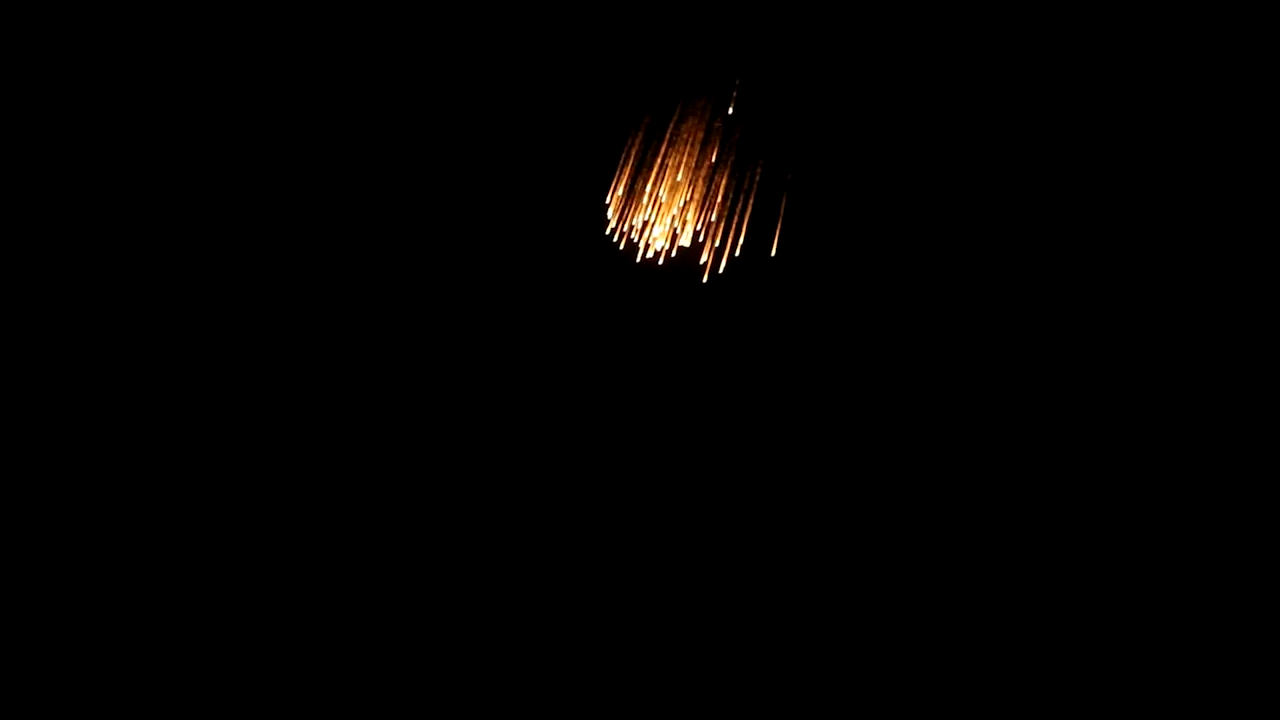
Russian aircraft drop firebombs in northern Aleppo in June 2016.

On 8 July 2016, a Syrian Mi-25 (a Russian Mi-35, according to other unofficial military sources) was destroyed on the ground from a United States-made BGM-71 TOW east of Palmyra, with two Russian pilots confirmed dead.

On 1 August 2016, a Russian Mi-8AMTSh transport helicopter was shot down on its way back to the Khmeimim base from a humanitarian mission to Aleppo by ground fire over Jabhat Fateh al-Sham-controlled area in Idlib province. Three crew members and two officers from the Russian Reconciliation Center for Syria were killed in the crush, then their corpses were desecrated by the rebels arrived on the scene.

On 16 August 2016, Russian Tu-22M bombers and Su-34 strike fighters began to use Iran's Hamedan Airbase for conducting raids over Syria.

For a period of time, from late June until the end of the Summer Aleppo campaign on 11 September, Russian Aerospace Forces and the Russian naval infantry advisors were heavily involved in the various battles against the rebels and their allies throughout the campaign, according to pro-Assad sources.

Russia's air force took active part in the Syrian government's re-newed Aleppo offensive that began in late September 2016, one of the consequences being the U.S. government in early October suspending talks on Syria with Russia. The Russian tactics and weapons used in the offensive have been compared to those used in Grozny against Chechen separatists. The U.S. government publicly stated that Russia was committing ″flagrant violations of international law″ in Syria and urged investigation of war crimes.

=== Mid-October 2016 – December 2016 ===
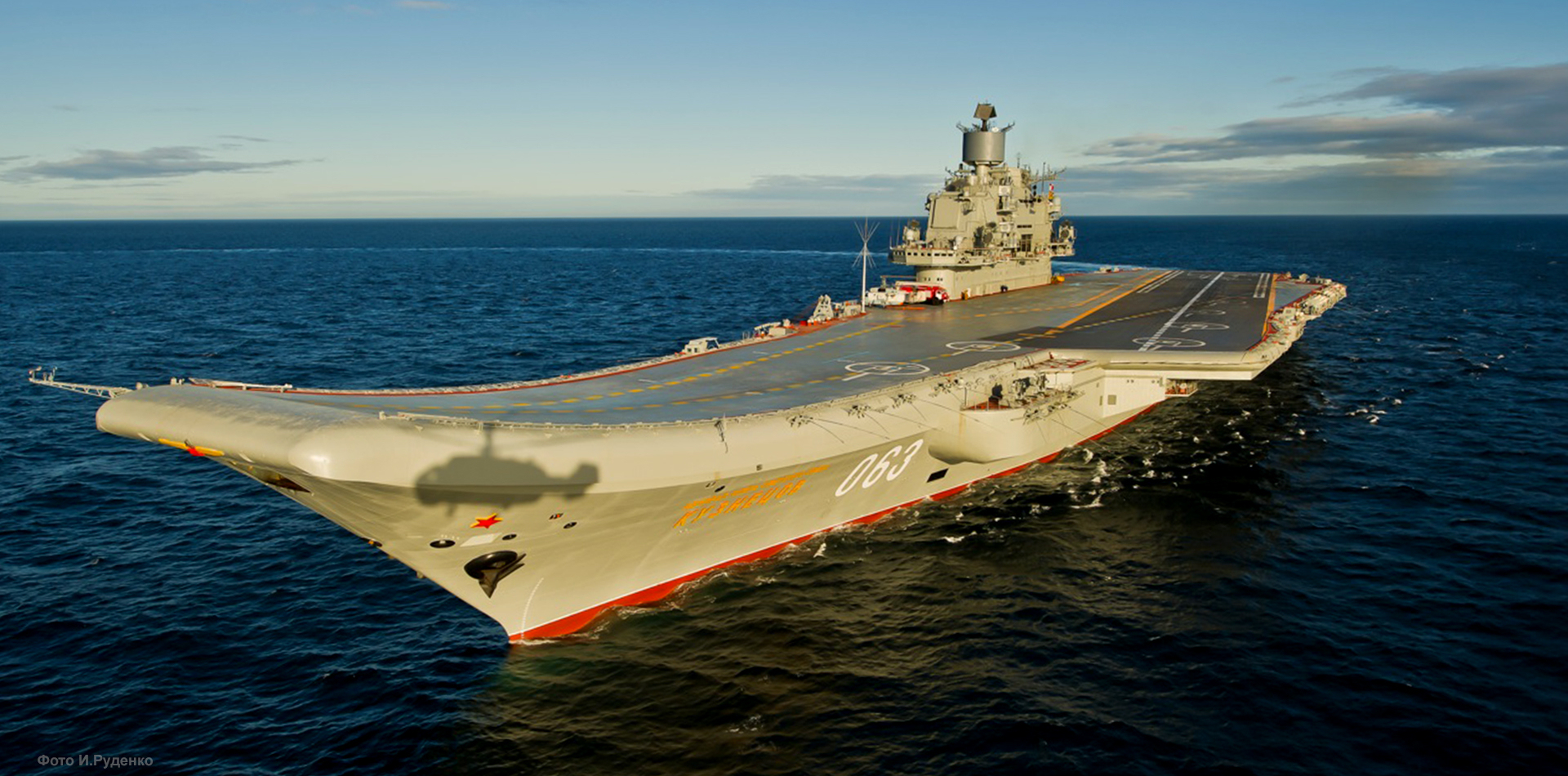
Admiral Kuznetsov departed for the Mediterranean on 15 October 2016

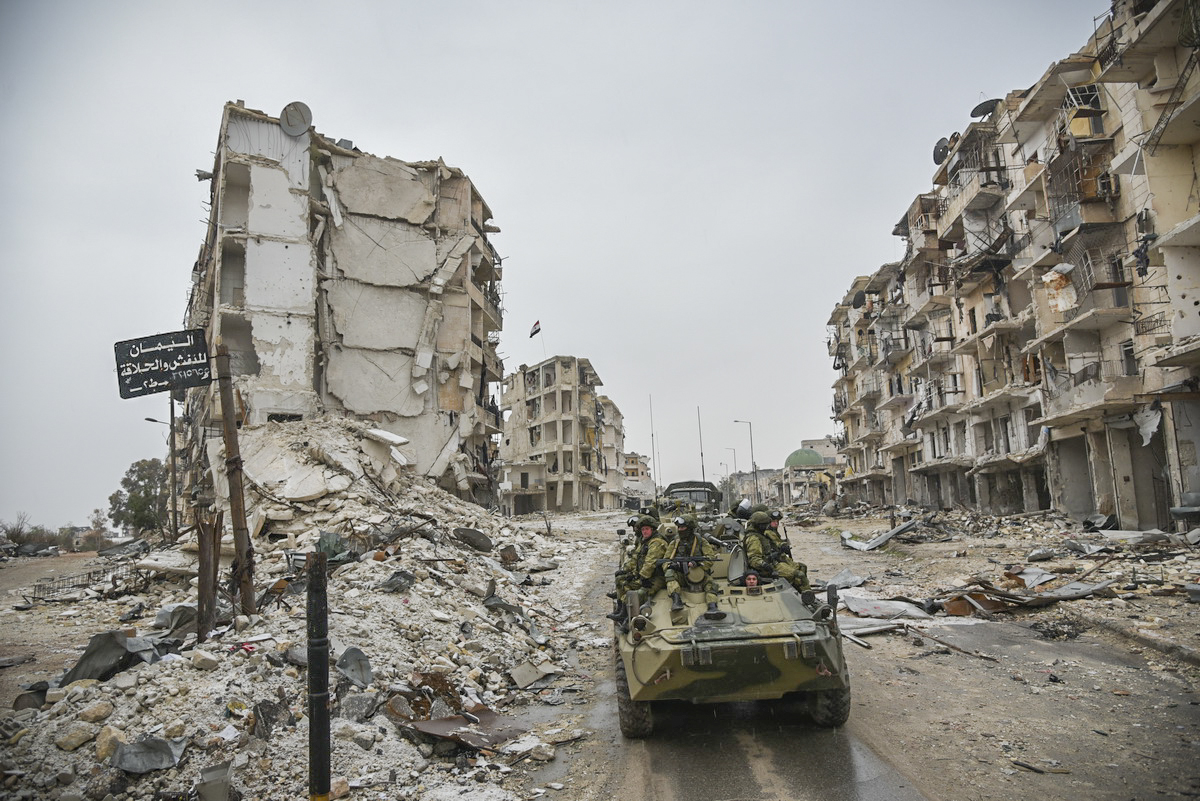
Russian troops in Aleppo in December 2016

On 15 October 2016, the aircraft carrier Admiral Kuznetsov sailed from Kola Bay at the centre of a task group, which included the Kirov-class missile cruiser Pyotr Velikiy, a pair of Udaloy-class destroyers and other vessels, to deploy to the Mediterranean in support of Russian forces operating in Syria. Vzglyad, a media outlet loyal to the Kremlin, reported that the Russian government said there was a three-week partial hiatus in Russian airstrikes raids from 18 October.

Admiral Kuznetsov's jets were reported to be flying off the Syrian coast on 8 November. On 14 November, a MiG-29K crashed en route back to the carrier following a planned mission over Syria, while an Su-33 crashed, again while trying to recover to Admiral Kuznetsov following a sortie on 5 December.

Other ships as well as K-300P Bastion-P were also reported to have taken part in a renewed bombing campaign on 17 November.

In late November, satellite images emerged showing several of Admiral Kuznetsov's fixed wing aircraft operating from Hmeimim Air Base in Latakia, with suggestions made that the number of sorties flown from the carrier was lower than had been claimed by the Russian Ministry of Defence. Problems with the ship's arrestor cables were cited as contributing to the crashed MiG-29K, which was circling the ship when it suffered an engine failure. At around the same time, an image was released by the Dutch frigate HNLMS De Ruyter showing the Nanuchka-class corvette Mirazh being towed back to the Black Sea.

By mid-December 2016 the Syrian government, with the help of its allies including Russia, re-established control of Aleppo.

=== January 2017 – June 2017 ===
On 1 January 2017, Russian and Turkish warplanes conducted joint airstrikes against ISIL as part of the Battle of al-Bab.

On 6 January, the Russian Defense Ministry, with a reference to a Moscow/Ankara-brokered ceasefire effective 30 December 2016, announced the start of a drawdown of its forces from Syria, pursuant to a decision taken by President Putin. The first element scheduled to depart the region was announced to be the Admiral Kuznetsov battle group. However, five days afterwards, a Fox News report cited ″two U.S. officials″ as saying that additional attack aircraft had been deployed by Russia to its airbase in Syria, namely four Su-25 jets which arrived on 9 January.

On 13 January, the Syrian Arab Army launched an offensive against ISIL in the Eastern Homs Governorate, intending to recapture Palmyra and its surrounding countryside. ISIL forces had retaken the city in a sudden counterattack. On 2 March 2017, the city of Palmyra was captured. On 5 March, a new offensive was launched which captured more than 230 square miles of territory around the city in a bid to expand the buffer zone around Palmyra.

On 20 March, it was reported that Russia set up a training base in Afrin Canton to train YPG units in order to combat terrorism. There were conflicting reports about its location, with Reuters reporting it was in Jandairis and the pro-government Al Masdar News placing it in the village of Kafr Jannah. At various times, Afrin was the target of artillery shelling by Islamist rebel groups as well as by Turkey. In response, Russian troops reportedly stationed themselves in Afrin as part of an agreement to protect the YPG from further Turkish attacks.

Russia scaled back its airstrikes in Syria in January and February, so that for the first time casualties due to US-led coalition airstrikes in Syria and Iraq began to exceed casualties of Russian strikes in Syria. However, strikes increased in March 2017, with a reported 114 incidents with 165–292 reported non-combatant deaths, primarily in Idlib province, Hama and the Damascus eastern suburbs.

In response to the downing of a Syrian government Su-22 plane by a U.S. fighter jet near the town of Tabqa in Raqqa province on 18 June 2017, Russia announced that U.S.-led coalition warplanes flying west of the Euphrates would be tracked by Russian anti-aircraft forces in the sky and on the ground and treated as targets. Furthermore, the Russian military said they suspended the hotline with their U.S. counterparts based in Al Udeid. In the wake of the announcement, Australia suspended military flights in Syria, while media reports speculated that the U.S. might be edging towards a full-on confrontation with Russia and Iran in Syria. Nevertheless, on 27 June 2017, U.S. Secretary of Defense Jim Mattis reassured the press: ″We deconflict with the Russians; it is a very active deconfliction line. It is on several levels, from the chairman of the Joint Chiefs and the secretary of state with their counterparts in Moscow, General Gerasimov and Minister Lavrov. Then we've got a three-star deconfliction line that is out of the Joints Chiefs of Staff, out of the J5 there. Then we have battlefield deconfliction lines. One of them is three-star again, from our field commander in Baghdad, and one of them is from our CAOC, our Combined Air Operations Center, for real-time deconfliction.″

=== July 2017 – December 2017 ===
On 24 July, the Russian military announced that Russia had begun to deploy military police to Syria to monitor a cease-fire in two new safe (de-escalation) zones that had been envisaged in the plan on four safe zones, tentatively agreed upon by Russia, Iran, and Turkey in May, and mapped out in early July by Russia, the U.S., and Jordan. Checkpoints and monitoring posts around safe zones in southwest Syria and in Eastern Ghouta were said to have been set up. Another such deployment was effected in early August — north of the city of Homs.

In August 2017, the Russian military announced that Al-Sukhnah town was captured from ISIS in early August with support of the Russian Aerospace Forces. Russian aviation said they had conducted 28,000 combat missions, and about 90,000 strikes as of late August 2017 during the operation in Syria.

On 5 September 2017, the Russian defence ministry said that the breaking of the three-year siege of Deir ez-Zor had been effected with active participation of Russian aviation and navy. President Putin congratulated both President Bashar Assad and the Russian commanders on "a very important strategic victory" (in his spokesman's words). Humanitarian aid was delivered to pro-government inhabitants of the city by the Russian servicemen. The Russian aviation continued active support of the Syrian forces operating in Deir ez-Zor.

The Russian military on 12 September said that 85 per cent of Syria's territory had been ″liberated from illegal armed formations″ and the operation would continue.

On 16 September, the U.S.-led coalition officials said Russian warplanes had bombed U.S.-backed militants in Deir ez-Zor, U.S. Special Operations Forces advising the SDF being "at most a couple of miles" away from where the bomb struck; the statement was denied by the Russian defence ministry.

According to the Russian defence ministry, the military police platoon (29 servicemen) deployed as part of the de-escalation observation forces in the Idlib de-escalation zone was on 19 September encircled by rebels, including Jabhat al-Nusra, as a result of their offensive against the Syrian troops positioned north and northeast of Hama. The encirclement was breached by Russian forces in a special operation leaving three servicemen of the Russian Special Operations Forces wounded. The Russian ministry stated that according to their intelligence, the rebels' ″offensive was initiated by the US special agencies in order to stop successful advance of the Syrian Arab Army to the east from Deir ez-Zor″. The Russian ministry's statement on the U.S.' role in the rebels' offensive was the following day endorsed by president Vladimir Putin's spokesman. On 21 September, the Russian MoD, in connection with what it called the U.S.-supported SDF having twice attacked positions of the Syrian Army in the Deir ez-Zor governorate with mortar and rocket fire, said: "Russia unequivocally told the commanders of U.S. forces in Al Udeid Air Base (Qatar) that it will not tolerate any shelling from the areas where the SDF are stationed. Fire from positions in regions [controlled by the SDF] will be suppressed by all means necessary." In early October, the Russian MoD continued to state that the U.S. forces were disguisedly supporting of the ISIL's attacks on Syrian government forces, especially from the area at Al-Tanf, and stated: "If the United States views such operations as unforeseen 'coincidences,' then the Russian air force in Syria is prepared to begin the complete destruction of all such 'coincidences' in the zones under their control." The MoD statement of 6 October referred to ″unlawful establishment by the U.S. of [Al-Tanf] military base″ and called it ″a 100-kilometre black hole" on the Syria-Jordan border.

On 11 December, days after declaring Syria had been "completely liberated" from ISIL and with the campaign liberating the western bank of the Euphrates in its final days, Russian president Vladimir Putin visited the Russian base in Syria, where he announced that he had ordered the partial withdrawal of the forces deployed to Syria. Several hours later, Sergei Shoigu said the troops had already begun to return.

On 26 December, defence minister Sergey Shoigu said that Russia had set about ″forming a permanent grouping" at the Tartus naval facility and the Hmeymim airbase, after president Putin approved the structure and the personnel strength of the Tartus and Hmeymim bases. On the same day, the upper chamber of parliament approved the ratification of an agreement between Russia and Syria on expanding the Tartus naval facility, which envisages turning it into a full-fledged naval base. At the end of December 2017, Sergei Shoigu claimed that the Russian military had eliminated several thousand "terrorists", while 48,000 Russian armed forces members had "gained combat experience" during the Russian operation in Syria.

=== January 2018 – August 2018 ===
In January—February 2018, the Russian air force continued to provide combat support to the Syrian Army in its offensive operations in the Hama Governorate and the Idlib Governorate. The Russian forces stationed in Syria lost a Su-25SM in the Idlib province on 3 February 2018.

Following reports about multiple Russian private contractor casualties in the U.S. air and artillery strike on pro-government forces near the town of Khasham in the Deir ez-Zor Governorate that occurred on 7 February 2018, the contingent of regular Russian forces stationed in Syria appeared to have been reinforced, though numerous witnesses of the strike dismissed the reports as untrue and did not confirm Russian mercenary participation. Namely, in mid-February, several Russian newest fifth generation Sukhoi Su-57 fighter aircraft were deployed to the Khmeimim air base in Syria; the deployment was interpreted by commentators as a possible response to the deployment of U.S. fifth-generation Lockheed Martin F-22 Raptor, which took part in the 7 February strike.

In June and July 2018, Russian forces actively supported the Syrian Army in the successful execution of the Southern Syria offensive, which resulted in the Syrian government's complete control of Daraa and Quneitra provinces. In August, Russia began to set up observation posts in Quneitra, along the UN-patrolled demilitarised zone in the Golan Heights; plans for eight such Russian-manned posts were announced. By mid-August, four such military police-manned posts along the Bravo line were set up.

At the end of August, the Russian media reported Russia was building up the largest ever naval grouping in eastern Mediterranean that included the cruiser Marshal Ustinov and all the three Admiral Grigorovich class frigates in service, including the latest Admiral Makarov. Speaking after talks with the Saudi Arabian foreign minister Adel al-Jubeir in Moscow on 29 August, Russia's foreign minister, in a reference to the Idlib rebel-held enclave, said, "[T]his festering abscess needs to be liquidated.″ Additionally, the Russian Embassy in Washington, D.C. published ambassador Anatoly Antonov's warning to the U.S. against ″yet another unprovoked and illegal aggression against Syria" on the pretext of a staged chemical attack.

On 30 August, the Russian MoD said it would conduct large-scale drills in eastern Mediterranean that would involve 25 ships and 30 planes. The drills would take place from 1 September until 8 September and the area would be closed for other countries' vessels and aircraft. The announcement was made amidst reports of the impending Syrian government's offensive in the Idlib province and anticipated military reaction on the part of the U.S.

=== September 2018 – March 2019 ===
On 17 September 2018, during multiple missile strikes by Israeli F-16 jets at targets in western Syria, Russia's Il-20 ELINT reconnaissance plane returning to Khmeimim Air Base, with 15 Russian servicemen on board, was inadvertently downed by a Syrian S-200 surface-to-air missile. Russia's defence minister the following day blamed Israel's military for the accident and re-affirmed its stance in a minute-by-minute report presented on 23 September. Early on 20 September, Russia's government-run news agency reported Russia had announced multiple areas of eastern Mediterranean ″near Syria, Lebanon, and Cyprus" shut for air and sea traffic until 26 September, due to the Russian Navy's drills in the area. Following the shoot down incident, Shoigu on 24 September said that within two weeks, the Syrian army would receive S-300 air-defense missile systems to strengthen Syria's combat air defence capabilities; a series of other military measures were announced such as radio-electronic jamming of "satellite navigation, onboard radars and communications systems used by military aircraft attacking targets in Syrian territory", in the areas of the Mediterranean off the Syrian coast.

On 8 November, according to the Russian MOD, Russian special forces stationed at the Russian Reconciliation Center either directly participated or guided the Syrian Arab Army in a successful special operation which rescued all the 19 remaining hostages alive, held by ISIL north-east of Palmyra. Some reports stated the possibility of Russian special forces being covertly deployed in the province of al-Suwayda to support the Syrian Army advance on ISIS positions in the al-Safa area for the remainder of the offensive.

The Russian Ministry of Defense reported that 68,000 Russian army servicemen had so far taken part in the Syrian intervention by 3 January 2019.

On 8 January 2019, Russian military units began patrolling areas in and around the vicinity of Manbij, including Arima.

On 13 March 2019, the Russian defence ministry said its jets had bombed Hay'at Tahrir al-Sham's targets in the city of Idlib, the operation having been cleared with Turkey. According to mass media reports, a displacement camp, as well as a prison were hit.

=== April 2019 – September 2019 ===
Fighting intensified in Idlib and nearby areas at the end of April 2019, Syrian and Russian forces striking the rebel targets.

On 13 June, the Russian military said fighting in the Idlib de-escalation zone had subsided as a result of a ceasefire agreement reached on Russia's initiative that came into force the day prior.

By 10 July 2019, the government offensive in Idlib was judged to have reached a standstill, Russia's ties with Turkey cited as the main brake on any full-scale attempt to take the entire northwest.

On 18 July, rebel commanders were cited by Reuters as saying that Russia had sent special forces to fight alongside Syrian army troops in northwestern Syria; Russia's defense ministry said these were false allegations.

On 29 August, the warplanes of Assad regime and Russia killed seven civilians in attacks in northwestern Syria. The region had been under cease-fire.

Officially, the campaign ended the next day on 30 August after a ceasefire was agreed upon by both the Syrian Arab Army and the rebels that would take effect on 31 August. Some skirmishes have taken place since September as fighting is still reported. Overall, it was a major advance in the Idlib deescalation zone for the Syrian Army after the complete liberation of Southern Idlib Governorate.

=== October 2019 ===
On 13 October 2019, Russian ground forces, along with the Syrian army entered and took the SDF-held areas on northeastern Syria following an agreement reached between the SDF and the Syrian government, shortly after Turkey commenced its cross-border incursion into the Kurdish-dominated region and the U.S. troops withdrew from the area. Russia's military police units began patrolling the town of Manbij.

=== November 2019 – September 2020 ===
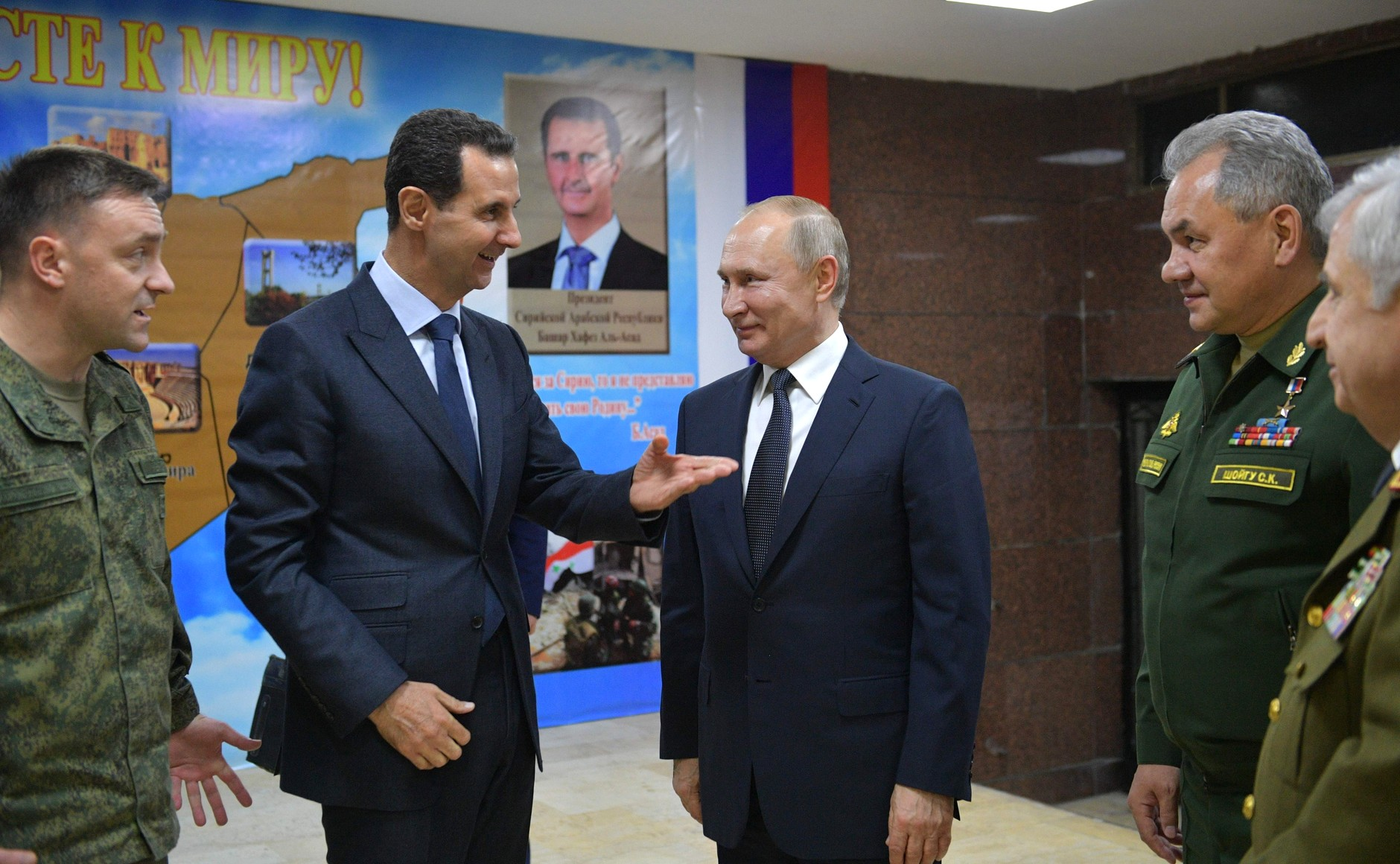
President Bashar al-Assad meets with President Vladimir Putin and Defence Minister Sergey Shoygu in Damascus, 7 January 2020

On 2 November 2019, Russian aviation struck a concentration of militants in the area of Jisr al-Shughur in the Idlib province. The massive bombing came two days after Bashar al-Assad issued an ultimatum to the militants in the area demanding that they leave or surrender.

On 24 November 2019, the Syrian Arab Army, supported by Russian airstrikes, launched "phase one" of the offensive against the rebels' stronghold in the Idlib province, which was officially announced on 19 December following the collapse of ceasefire agreements. The Russian-supported Syrian government offensive successfully continued into 2020, achieving, among other objectives, the establishment of full government control of the area along the entire M5 highway for first time since 2012. Meanwhile, relations between Russia and Turkey, which was sending heavy armour and thousands of its regular troops to fight on the side of the rebels in a bid to stem the government offensive, strained significantly and direct Russian strikes on regular Turkish forces were reported, Turkey's president Erdogan announcing an imminent Turkish intervention in the area. On 20 February, Turkish defence minister Hulusi Akar told the news media there should be "no doubt" that Turkey would activate the S-400 missile systems it had bought from Russia in 2019.

On 27 February 2020, according to reports from the scene, two Russian Su-34s conducted an airstrike on a Turkish military convoy killing at least 34 Turkish regular troops. Turkey did not officially blame Russia for the airstrike while Russia denied responsibility saying that the Syrian Air Force was likely behind the strike. According to Russia's defence ministry, Turkish service people "were in the battle formations of terrorist groups" when they came under the fire of Syrian troops. Meanwhile, Russia ratcheted up efforts through both official statements and state-sponsored mass media aiming to drive home the message that Turkey itself was to blame for its fatalities as Turkish forces were not supposed to be in Syria in the first place.

On 2 March, according to Saily Sabah and TASS, Russian military announced that Russia's Military Police forces had been deployed to Saraqib following weeks of heavy fighting for control of this strategic town that saw it change hands several times; the declared objective was to secure safe passage of vehicles and civilians travelling along the M4 and M5 highways.

On 15 March, Russian and Turkish forces started joint-patrols on the M4 highway as a part of a ceasefire agreement between Russia and Turkey. According to Turkish Foreign Minister Mevlut Cavusoglu, Russian military forces will patrol the southern side while Turkey's military will patrol to the north of the highway.

On 18 August, a Russian major general was killed and two servicemen were injured by a roadside bomb in Syria while en route to Hmeimim Air Base from Deir ez-Zor.

In mid-September, Russian news media published officially unverified reports about "most powerful strikes" carried out on 15 September by Russian aviation as well as Iskander missiles against "terrorists", including Hay'at Tahrir al-Sham, near the town of Maarrat Misrin.

=== Since October 2020 ===
Russian SU-34 and SU-35 jets drop flares in the flight path of a U.S. MQ-9 Reaper over Syria, 6 July 2023

On 26 October 2020, the Russian airstrike on a training base run by Faylaq al-Sham, a major rebel group backed by Turkey, in the town of Kafr Takharim was reported to have killed at least 78 Turkish-backed militia fighters.

On 19 April 2021, Russian warplanes executed airstrikes on militant facilities in central Syria, northeast the city of Palmyra according to the Russian Reconciliation Center in Syria. The Russian Defence Ministry claimed that some 200 militants along with 24 vehicles with weapons and 500 kilograms of ammunitions and explosives were destroyed in the operation without specifying the affiliation of the militants. The SOHR confirmed the airstrikes but stated that only 26 ISIS militants were killed in the region.

In May 2021, Russia said that three Tu-22Ms became the first bombers deployed to the Khmeymim airbase in Syria with the aim of enhancing the stability in the region.

On 17 May 2022, a Russian operated S-300 missile system is said to have fired a missile at a F-16 operated by the IAF. If confirmed it would be the first time Russian forces have fired on Israeli jets. It is also possible Russian forces have handed the missile system over to Syrian forces.

In late May 2022, amid growing concerns of a new Turkish military incursion into northern Syria, Russia sent military reinforcements to Qamishli Airport.

On 10 June 2022, Russia had conducted joint military exercises with the Syrian Army south of Idlib. Russia had also dispatched an additional eight military helicopters to Abu al-Duhur Military Airbase, south of Aleppo.

During the 2022 Russian invasion of Ukraine, Russia was reported to be withdrawing (since May) its troops from Syria as reinforcements to its dwindling forces in Ukraine; according to Moscow Times (16 September 2022), the re-deployment of Russia's last reserves in Syria is under way.

During the year of 2022, the SOHR reported that at least 3,935 airstrikes were conducted by Russian forces in 2022 and that 159 ISIS militants were killed and another 255 were injured by Russian airstrikes on Islamic State positions throughout the country.

As of summer 2023, Russia had 20 military bases in Syria as well as 85 other military points, the majority in Hama, Al-Hasakah, Latakia and Aleppo provinces. In March 2023, President Assad told Russian media that "increasing the number of Russian military bases in Syrian territory might be necessary in the future because Russia's presence in Syria is linked to the global balance of power."

=== 2024 Syrian opposition offensive ===
As of 2024, the Russian operational group in Syria consisted of special forces units, base security units, and part of an Air Force unit, maintained on a rotational basis.

During the Northwestern Syrian offensive in 2024, the Russian Air Force renewed operations - conducting a number of airstrikes since the militants launched their offensive against Assad's forces in late November. The airstrikes were however limited and instead bombed civilian targets in the Idlib and Hama regions, specifically urban neighborhoods and refugee camps, including Morek, Khan Sheikhoun, Kanfranbel, Hazarin and Tal Kawkabah. At least 50 people are reported to have been killed by the airstrikes.

On November 29 rebel forces had entered Aleppo. The day after several more settlements were seized, with the rebels entering Hama and Homs. On 7 December 2024, the outskirts of Damascus were reached by rebel forces.

Following Damascus's seizure, Russia confirmed that Assad had left Syria and had stepped down. This was followed by an announcement by the Syrian army command to officers that the Assad regime had ended.

Following the rapid disintegration of Syrian republic forces and the swift advance by the Syrian opposition forces, Russian airstrikes increased, but they were unable to stop any of the offensives.

On 30 November, the Deir ez-Zor offensive conducted by opposition forces managed to consolidate a hold in the industrial zones of the city of Deir ez-Zor. Russian forces on the ground operating in the area were thus forced to coordinate a withdrawal of military equipment and personnel from multiple headquarters of the city, relocating these assets on the eastern bank of the Euphrates before pulling out all together the following day.

On 1 December 2024, Russia conducted an airstrike on the University of Aleppo in Aleppo, Syria, killing 12 people and injuring 23 others. Two journalists were killed by the airstrike.

=== Fall of the Assad regime ===
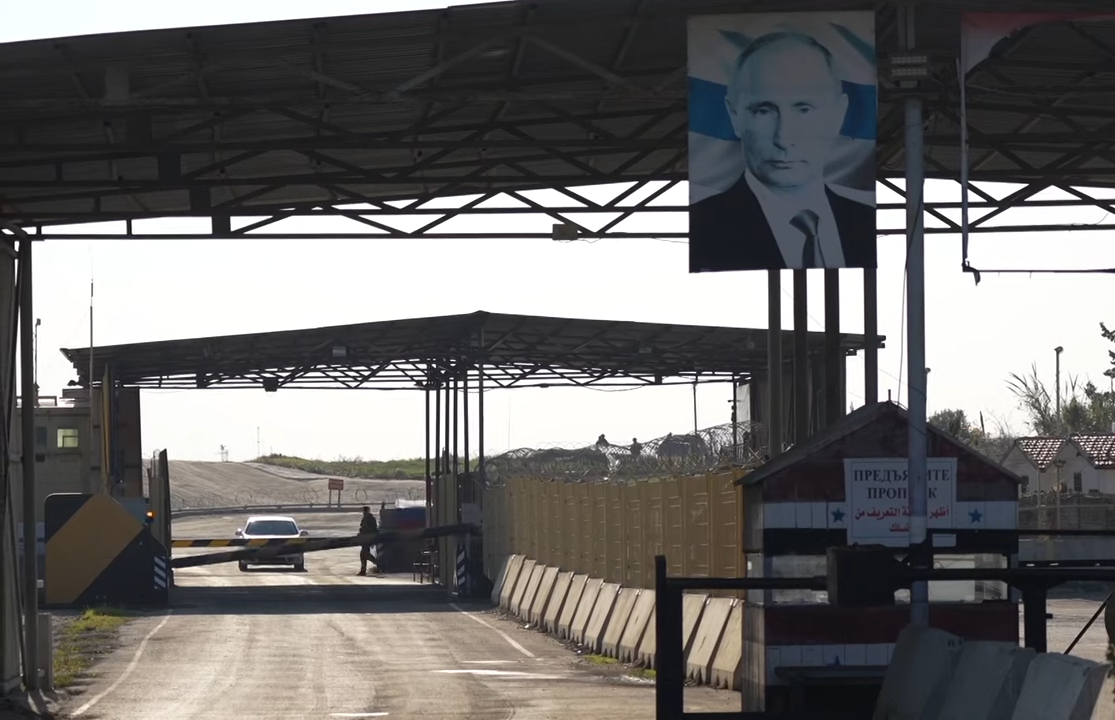
Entrance to the Khmeimim Air Base with Russian presence after Assad's Fall. The Image of Bashar al-Assad torn down by Russian soldiers, 18 December 2024

Russian intervention ceased on 6 December after an airstrike failed to sever the key Homs-Hama 'Al-Rastan' bridge (merely damaging it) - opposition forces thus captured Homs with ease. Following this, Russia was unable to help Assad's forces any further, and their forces began evacuating its military fleet from bases in western Syria. The Russian embassy at Damascus was also in lockdown following the rebel capture of the city; Russia also ordered their citizens to flee the country.

The two Russian bases in Syria had also been cut off creating a tense standoff - the airbase at Hmeimim airbase, and also the naval facility at Tartous. Russia vowed swift responses if these two were attacked, but Syrian opposition leaders have guaranteed the safety of the Russian bases as well as the diplomatic missions which have remained inside Syria.

On 14 December 2024, Russian forces were withdrawing some of its forces from northern Syria and posts in the Alawite Mountains. They left in a convoy, heading towards the naval base at Tartous. In addition several large transport aircraft had arrived at Khmeimim air base, whilst helicopters and air defences were being disassembled. According to Syrian officials, Russia was not however pulling out of the bases and currently had no intention of doing so.

On 24 January 2025, Syria terminated the investment agreement that granted Russia the operation of Tartous for 49 years. This meant that Russia would have to withdraw from the naval port at some point.

== Assessments of tactics and effectiveness ==
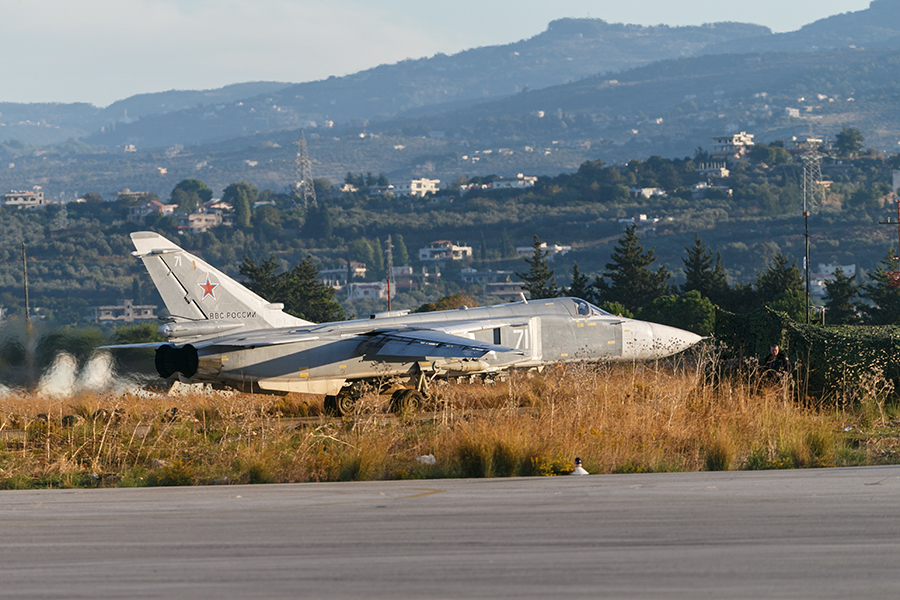
A Russian Su-24 jet aircraft in Latakia, government-held Latakia Governorate.

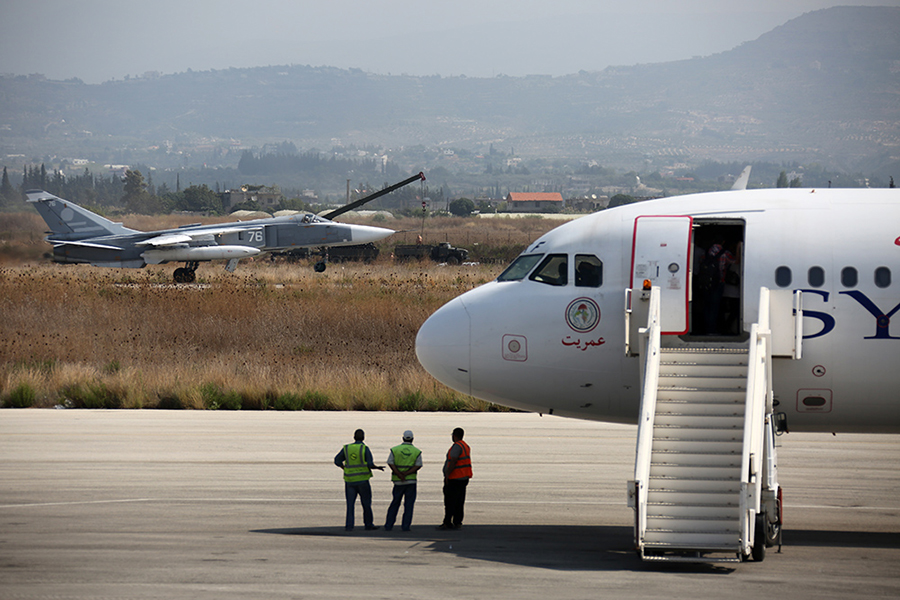
Russian Sukhoi Su-24 passes a Syrian Air Airbus A320 at Latakia International Airport.

By late February 2016, the Russian Air Force conducted around 60 airstrikes daily, while the American-led coalition averaged seven. Pro-government website Al-Masdar News said that these Russian airstrikes have proven particularly effective against the ISIS oil trade and supply routes in the Syrian Desert. An estimated 209 oil facilities were destroyed by the airstrikes, along with over 2,000 petroleum transports. By the time of the withdrawal of the "main part" of its forces in mid-March, Russia had conducted over 9,000 sorties over the course of five and a half months, while helping the Syrian Army capture 400 towns and regain 10,000 square kilometres of territory. The Russian military followed the Chechnya Counter-Insurgency model, and "a revanchist Russia, even with a stagnated mono-industrial economy surprised the international community with the pace of attack and will to sustain the operation."

In January 2016, a few months after the start of Russia's involvement in Syria, diplomat Ranjit Gupta wrote in The Commonwealth Journal of International Affairs, that the Russian reinforcement was a "godsend for Assad, greatly boosting the regime's sagging morale and that of its armed forces." Gupta continued:

With robust air cover provided by Russian airstrikes Assad's forces can start liberating and holding territory, particularly in the extremely strategically vital corridor connecting Damascus and Aleppo. Russian help provides Assad's military the distinct possibilities to regain the upper hand in the conflict, particularly in northwestern and western Syria at least.

In February 2016, Professor Fawaz A. Gerges of the London School of Economics opined the Russian military intervention had turned out to be a game-changer in the Syrian Civil War: ″Mr Putin's decision to intervene in Syria and shore up Mr Assad with new fighter jets, military advisers and advanced weapons stopped the bleeding of the Syrian army and allowed it to shift from defence to offence.″

Vincent R. Stewart, Director of the Defense Intelligence Agency, stated in February 2016 that the "Russian reinforcement has changed the calculus completely" and added that Assad "is in a much stronger negotiating position than he was just six months ago".

Western media and analysts conclude that Russia's intervention in Syria kept Assad in power and even turned the tide of the war in his favour.

In the week following the start of combat missions, the website RealClear Defense, part of the RealClearPolitics group, published an assessment of the effectiveness of the Admiral Kuznetsov as a platform for airstrikes, noting the small size of its air group (estimated at a total of eight Su-33 and four MiG-29K aircraft), the difficulties with the MiG-29K, which is seen as the more effective platform for strike missions, the smaller amounts of smart weapons for the Su-33 (which is primarily a fleet air defence aircraft), and the lack of aircraft catapults on the carrier, which limits the take-off weight of its aircraft.

Five years into the intervention, Russian strategy had prevented the total collapse of Assad's Ba'athist government and rolled back the territorial advances made by Syrian rebels. As a result, Russia had become more active in West Asia, prompting many analysts to discuss a "Russian resurgence" and even draw comparisons to Cold War-era geo-political tensions. Russian tactics and weapons used in the offensive have been compared to those used in the Battle of Grozny (1999–2000) against Chechen separatists.

During the 2024 Syrian opposition offensives in November, Russian intervention, using airstrikes, special forces and artillery was not sufficient to halt the Syrian Opposition forces. The latter swiftly captured vast swathes of territory including Damascus on 7 December which forced Bashar al-Assad to flee, ending his regime altogether and prompting a Russian withdrawal.

== Weapons and munitions employed ==
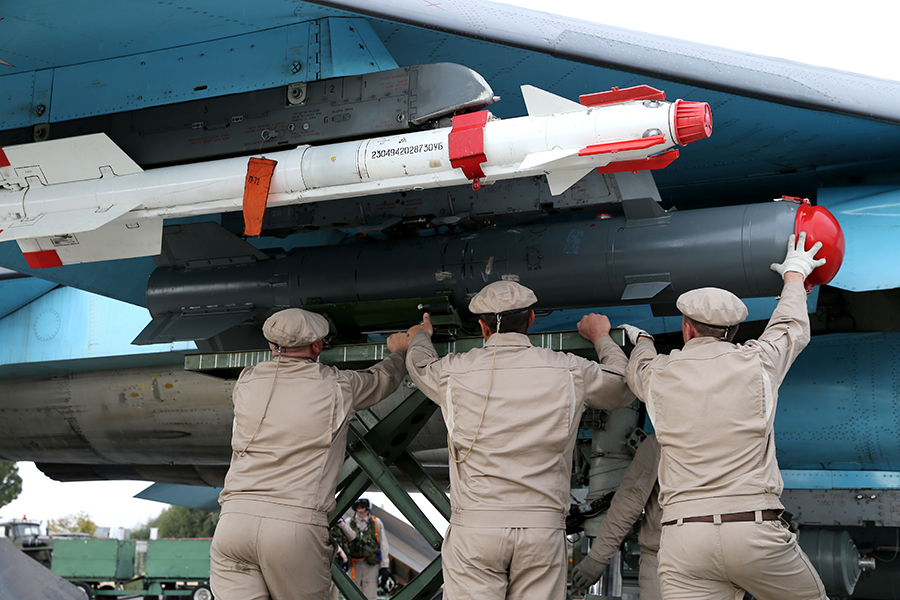
Russian air group personnel in Syria fit a KAB-500KR guided bomb on an Su-34 jet based in Hmeymim

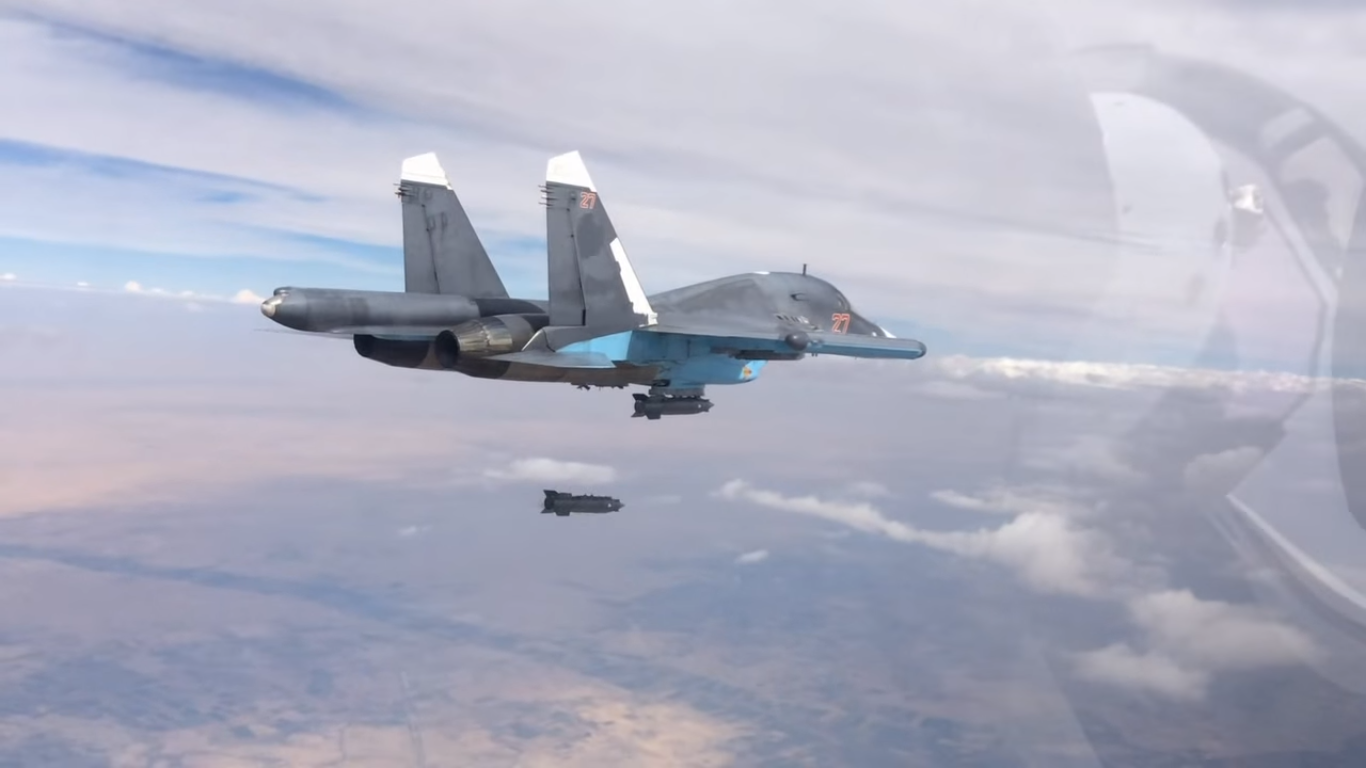
A Russian Su-34 dropping a KAB-500S-E guided bomb during a bombing mission above Syria

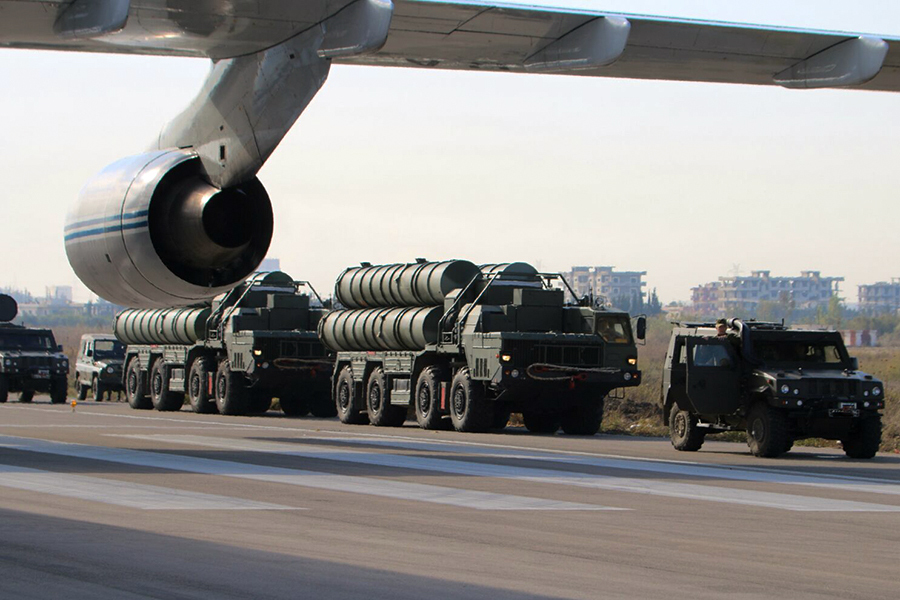
Unloading of S-400 anti-aircraft missile systems ("Hmeymim" air base, Syrian Arab Republic)

Russian forces in Syria were reported to have used a mix of precision-guided munitions and unguided weapons. The October 2015 airstrikes were Russia's first operational use of precision-guided munitions, whose development in Russia lagged behind other major powers. The majority of weapons employed, however, were unguided. Most Russian jets employ the SVP-24 guidance system, which allows them to use unguided munitions with high precision, close to the precision of guided ones, with substantially smaller costs.

Russia also used cruise missiles launched from corvettes, Admiral Grigorovich class frigates, and Kilo-class submarines, as well as artillery in the form of howitzers and multiple rocket launchers. The air campaign was estimated to cost between $2.3 and $4 million a day in its early phase. The 3M-14T cruise missiles, that Russia has used extensively, cost roughly $1.2 million per unit.

Russian defense minister Sergei Shoigu said in August 2021 that Russia had tested more than 300 weapons over the course of its campaign in Syria.

== Civilian casualties and war crimes ==
The Syrian Network for Human Rights (SNHR) and Violations Documentation Centre (VDC) stated that from between September 2015 and the end of February 2016, Russian air strikes killed more than 2,000 civilians. SNHR report stated that the number of civilians killed in Russian military attacks exceeded those killed by the Islamic State (IS) and the Ba'athist Syrian armed forces since the launch of the Russian military intervention. Weapons used by the Russian military forces included unguided bombs, cluster bombs, incendiaries similar to white phosphorus and thermobaric weapons.

Russian bombardment campaigns have caused enormous destruction of public infrastructure, religious buildings, heritage sites, industrial areas, residential places; in addition to massive amounts of civilian casualties; which has aggravated the Syrian refugee crisis. Between September 2015 and March 2019, Russian aerial campaigns alone resulted in an estimated 18,150 deaths; including 8000 civilians, consisting of thousands of women and children. Approximately 5,000 of the combatants killed in bombings were rebel fighters and another 5,000 were members of the Islamic State. Around 25,000 children were killed and an estimated 1,197 schools have been destroyed in the joint attacks of Ba'athist and Russian military forces, between March 2011 and November 2021.

Scorched earth tactics have been a major component of Russian-backed military campaign against opposition militias. Throughout the campaign, Russian airforce and allied ground troops implemented "starve-or-submit" strategy while besieging towns and cities held by rebel forces. According to Amnesty International, in late February 2016, Russian warplanes deliberately targeted civilians and rescue workers during their bombing campaign. The human rights group has documented attacks on schools, hospitals and civilian homes. Amnesty International also said that "Russia is guilty of some the most egregious war crimes" it had seen "in decades". The director of Amnesty's crisis response program, Tirana Hassan, said that after bombing civilian targets, the Russian warplanes "loop around" for a second attack to target the humanitarian workers and civilians who are trying to help those have been injured in the first sortie.

In February 2016, Human Rights Watch (HRW) reported extensive use of cluster munitions by Syria and Russia, in violation of United Nations resolution 2139 of 22 February 2014, which demanded that all parties end "indiscriminate employment of weapons in populated areas". HRW said that "Russian or Syrian forces were responsible for the attacks" and that the munitions were "manufactured in the former Soviet Union or Russia" and that some were of a type that had "not been documented as used in Syria" prior to Russia's involvement in the war, which they said, suggested that "either Russian aircraft dropped them or Russian authorities recently provided the Syrian government with more cluster munitions, or both". HRW also said that while neither Russia nor Syria are parties to the Cluster Munitions Convention, the use of such munitions contradicts statements issued by the Syrian government that they would refrain from using them.

In February 2016, Médecins Sans Frontières said that either the Assad regime or Russian warplanes deliberately attacked a hospital in Ma'arrat al-Nu'man. The Syrian Observatory for Human Rights stated that it was Russian warplanes that destroyed the hospital. In March 2016, Amnesty International reported that the Russian aerial bombing campaign in opposition-held territories involved the methodical targeting of hospitals and medical facilities, describing it as a calculated "military strategy" to forcibly displace civilian inhabitants.

In 2016, opposition activists and local witnesses have reported that Russia has used white phosphorus against targets in Raqqa and Idlib, causing civilian casualties with the weapons. U.S. officials repeatedly stated that hospitals in Syria were attacked by Russian forces. The Syrian Observatory for Human Rights reported that by mid-February 2016, Russian air strikes had killed 1,000 civilians, including 200 children, since the initiation of the intervention in September 2015. In March 2016, Amnesty International reported "compelling evidence" of at least six such attacks. These reports, including the bombing of two hospitals by Russian Air Force planes, have been denied by Russian officials. In May 2016 the Russian delegation to the UN Security Council vetoed a statement condemning the air strikes on a refugee camp in Idlib on 5 May.

In June 2016, Russia Today, while reporting minister Shoigu's visit to Hmeymim air base, showed incendiary cluster bombs being loaded onto Russian airplanes, identified as RBK-500 ZAB-2.5SM due to clearly visible markings. After this information, inconsistent with official Russian statements, the video was removed but later reinstated and uploaded by RT. An editorial note below the video made no mention of the weapon, saying a frame in the video has caused "concern for personnel safety" because of a pilot's close-up. "Upon re-evaluation it was deemed that the frame did not pose any risks; it had since been restored and the video is up in its original cut," the RT statement said.

In February 2018, Human Rights Watch and Amnesty International released reports stating that Russia was committing war crimes and deliberately targeting civilians. By the end of April 2018, the SOHR documented that Russian bombings directly killed more than 7,700 civilians, about a quarter of them children, apart from 4,749 opposition fighters and 4,893 IS fighters.

By the end of 2018, Airwars, which monitors reports of casualties of all airstrikes, had documented 2,730–3,866 civilian deaths in Syria in some 39,000 Russian strikes, including 690–844 children and 2,017 named victims, although Russia officially confirmed none of these. Russia stated it had flown 39,000 sorties (not strikes) as of late 2018. The annual total for 2018 according to Airwars was 730 strikes killing 2,169 civilians.

In May 2019 United Nations officials said the Russian and Syrian governments intentionally bombed eight hospitals in Idlib whose GPS coordinates were passed to Russia as part of agreed "deconfliction mechanism" with hope to prevent "accidental bombing" which was previously used as an excuse by the governments. In August 2019, over 19 civilians were killed within two days after Russian forces carried out air-raids on a "displaced persons camp" near Hass village in southern Idlib. Also in August, the UN has opened an investigation into the bombing of hospitals.

In October 2019, The New York Times published further evidence of coordinated attacks of Russian aviation against hospitals on the "deconfliction list", consisting of airplane sightings, intercepted radio conversations of pilots and air control exchanging GPS coordinates of specific hospitals which were bombed soon after.

The Airwars report for 2019 recorded 710 claimed Russian casualty events in Syria – a 3% fall on 2018 – killing between 1,099 and 1,745 civilians. 81% of the events were in Idlib, 13% in Hama, and 5% in Aleppo. The strikes mainly occurred during the Idlib offensive of May to September, with the single worst incident being the July 22nd strikes in Ma'arrat al-Numan which killed up to 42 civilians. A New York Times investigation confirmed Russia's culpability in the latter. The investigation also detailed Russian attacks on the Martyr Akram Ali Ibrahim Al-Ahmad School in Qalaat al-Madiq on 28 April 2019.

The Russian campaign has been criticised by numerous international bodies for indiscriminate aerial bombings across Syria that target schools and civilian infrastructures and carpet bombing of cities like Aleppo. The findings of BMJ Global Health and a UN investigation report published in 2020 revealed that the RuAF also "weaponized health-care" through its hospital bombardment campaigns; by pursuing a deliberate policy of bombing ambulances, clinical facilities, hospitals and all medical infrastructure. (Note: Sources: Borshchevskaya 2022 pp 69–88; Reinl, James (19 September 2019). "Russia blasted at UN for 'carpet bombing' Syria". Aljazeera. Archived from the original on 26 March 2022.; Shield, Ralph (2022). "Chapter 10". In Jackson, Colin; Haun, Phil; Schultz, Tim (eds.). Air Power in the Age of Primacy: Air Warfare Since the Cold War. New York: Cambridge University Press. pp. 249–253. ISBN 978-1-108-83922-8.; Oloruntoba, Samuel Ojo; Falola, Toyin, eds. (2021). The Palgrave Handbook of Africa and the Changing Global Order. Cham, Switzerland: Palgrave Macmillan. p. 705. doi:10.1007/978-3-030-77481-3. ISBN 978-3-030-77480-6. S2CID 244495705.; McFaul, Michael (2018). "Epilogue: Trump and Putin". From Cold War to Hot Peace: The Inside Story of Russia and America. New York, New York: Houghton Mifflin Harcourt. ISBN 978-0-544-71624-7.) Russia also reportedly employed double tap strikes to target relief workers.

A 2020 report by UN Human Rights Council for the first time directly laid responsibility on Russian Air Force of indiscriminate attacks on civilian targets "amounting to a war crime" referring specifically to extensive evidence on the bombing of a refugee shelter in Haas and a market place in Ma'arrat al-Nu'man in summer 2019.

By August 2022, Airwars estimated 4,308-6,386 civilians killed from Russian airstrikes since 2015, including 1,151-1,403 children, 627-760 women, and 3,192 named victims. The Russian military has denied that any of its strikes have caused any civilian casualties in Syria. Russian bombing has also injured 6,508-10,169 people.

== Wagner Group involvement ==
The presence of the Wagner Group private military contractors (PMCs) in Syria was first reported in late October 2015, almost a month after the start of the Russian military intervention in the country's civil war, when between three and nine PMCs were killed in a rebel mortar attack on their position in Latakia province. It was reported that the Wagner Group was employed by the Russian Defense Ministry, even though private military companies are illegal in Russia. The Russian Defense Ministry dismissed the early reports by The Wall Street Journal about the Wagner Group's operations in Syria as an "information attack". However, sources within the Russian FSB and the Defense Ministry unofficially stated for RBTH that Wagner was supervised by the GRU.

Wagner PMCs were notably involved in both Palmyra offensives in 2016 and 2017, as well as the Syrian Army's campaign in central Syria in the summer of 2017 and the Battle of Deir ez-Zor in late 2017. They were in the role of frontline advisors, fire and movement coordinators forward air controllers who provided guidance to close air support and "shock troops" alongside the Syrian Army.

Besides fighting ISIL militants, according to RBK TV, the PMCs trained a Syrian Army unit called the ISIS Hunters, which was also fully funded and trained by Russian special forces.

In early February 2018, the PMCs took part in a battle at the town of Khasham, in eastern Syria, which resulted in heavy casualties among Syrian government forces and the Wagner Group as they were engaged by United States air and artillery strikes, due to which the incident was billed by media as "the first deadly clash between citizens of Russia and the United States since the Cold War".

Subsequently, the Wagner Group took part in the Syrian military's Rif Dimashq offensive against the rebel-held Eastern Ghouta, east of Damascus. The whole Eastern Ghouta region was captured by government forces on 14 April 2018, effectively ending the near 7-year rebellion near Damascus.

The PMCs also took part in the Syrian Army's offensive in northwestern Syria that took place mid-2019.

As of late December 2021, Wagner PMCs were still taking part in military operations against ISIL cells in the Syrian desert.

== Cooperation with Iran ==
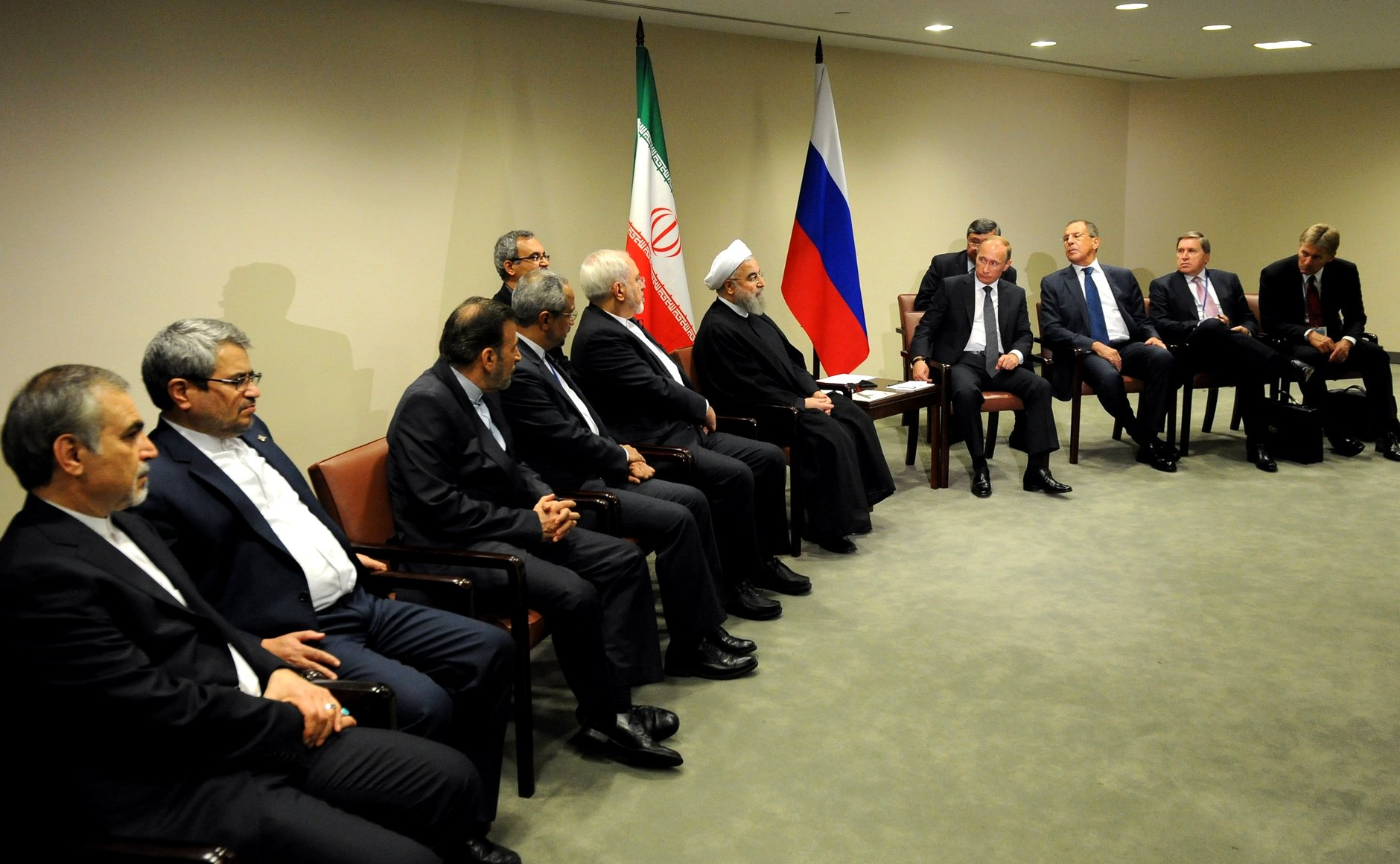
Vladimir Putin meets Iranian President Hassan Rouhani in New York, 29 September 2015.

Iran continues to officially deny the presence of its combat troops in Syria, maintaining that it provides military advice to President Assad's forces in their fight against terrorist groups. It is stated that the Syrian Arab Army receives substantial support from the Quds Force; in June 2015, some reports suggested that the Iranian military were effectively in charge of the Syrian government troops on the battlefield.

After the loss of Idlib province to a rebel offensive in the first half of 2015, the situation was judged to have become critical for Assad's survival. High level talks were held between Moscow and Tehran in the first half of 2015 and a political agreement was achieved; on 24 July, ten days after the signing of the nuclear agreement between Iran and the P5+1 countries, General Qasem Soleimani visited Moscow to devise the details of the plan for coordinated military action in Syria.

In mid-September 2015, the first reports of new detachments from the Iranian Revolutionary Guards arriving in Tartus and Latakia in western Syria were made in pro-Assad media: with much of the Syrian Arab Army and National Defence Force units deployed to more volatile fronts, Russian Marines and the Iranian Revolutionary Guard Corps (IRGC) relieved their positions by installing military checkpoints inside the cities of Slunfeh (east Latakia Governorate), Masyaf (East Tartus Governorate) and Ras al-Bassit (Latakia coastal city). There were further reports of new Iranian contingents being deployed to Syria in early October 2015. After the start of the Russian operation, it was generally thought that Iran will be playing a leading role in the ground operations of Syria's army and allies, whilst Russia will be leading in the air in conjunction with the Syrian Arab Air Force, thereby establishing a complementary role.

After the meeting between Vladimir Putin and Ali Khamenei in Tehran on 23 November 2015, Iran was said to have made a decision to unify its stance vis-a-vis the Syrian leadership with Russia's.

The use of Iran's Hamadan Airbase by Russian military aircraft that began in mid-August 2016 marked a new level of cooperation between the countries in their support for the Syrian government.

The network of Iranian bases in Syria, some with many many underground tunnels were hurriedly abandoned during the collapse of the Assad regime in 2024, leaving behind weapons, sensitive documents and personal effects.

== Anti-war sentiment ==
Russian authorities have made efforts to avoid a repeat of the humiliating experience of Soviet withdrawal from Afghanistan. Casualty figures of Russian troops and PMCs have been either undercounted officially or undisclosed. Fearing the implications of a protracted war in Syria, Russian government had been keen to regularly issue declarations of victory, in order to provide the idea that the war was about to end. Despite continued stationing of Russian boots on the ground, Putin had twice declared "the withdrawal of Russian troops", in 2016 and 2017. With the military intervention being extended indefinitely as a protracted conflict, war weariness had been rising in the Russian society. A 2019 poll conducted by Levada Center revealed that at least 55% of Russian citizens demanded the end of all military operations in Syria; up from 49% in 2017.

== Reactions ==
=== Syria ===
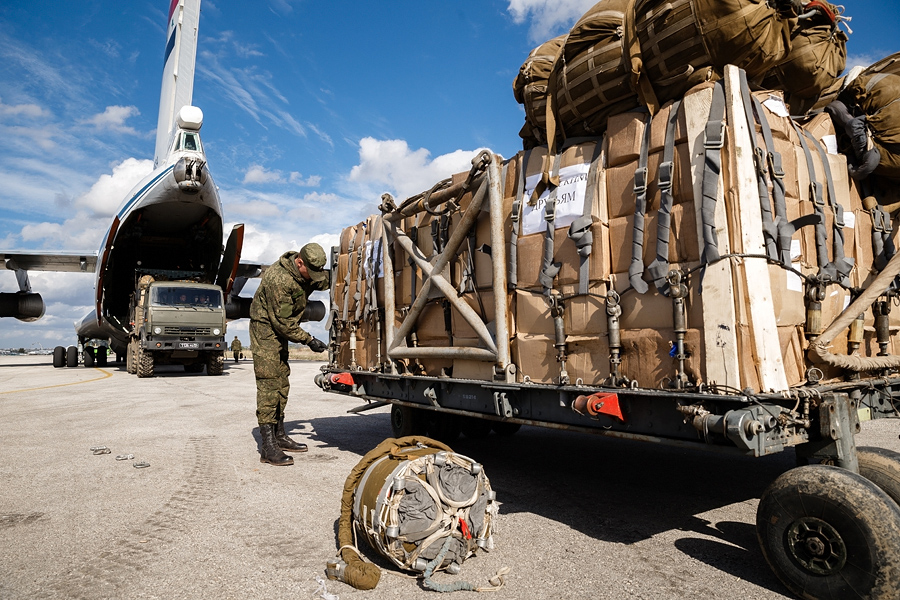
Russian troops prepare parachute platform P-7s with humanitarian aid for landing in Deir ez-Zor.

Syria:

- On 1 October 2015, the Syrian Ambassador to Russia, Riyad Haddad, stated that the Russian air force is acting in full coordination with the Syrian army. He added that Syria's position is that the Russian intervention is the only legitimate intervention under international law and called for other countries to join the "non-criminal" Russian intervention in Syria.

=== International ===
==== Supranational ====
United Nations – On 31 October 2015, UN Secretary General Ban Ki-moon said in an interview with Spanish daily El Mundo "The future of Assad must be decided by the Syrian people," and "The Syrian government states that President Assad takes part (in any transitional government) but others, especially Western countries, say there is no place for him, but because of that we have lost three years, there have been more than 250,000 dead, more than 13 million displaced within Syria... more than 50 percent of hospitals, schools and infrastructure have been destroyed. There's no time to lose."

In 2016, retired war crimes prosecutor Carla Del Ponte, who was researching rights abuses in Syria as part of the Independent International Commission of Inquiry on the Syrian Arab Republic, told an interviewer "I think the Russian intervention is a good thing, because finally someone is attacking these terrorist groups", but added that Russia is not distinguishing enough between terrorist and other groups. In 2017, she complained that Russia was using its UN Security Council veto to prevent prosecution of war crimes in Syria, leading her to resign from her role in Syria.

NATO – NATO condemned Russian air strikes and urged Russia to stop supporting al-Assad. On 8 October 2015, it renewed assurances to defend the allies in view of the "escalation of Russian military activities."

U.S.-led coalition – On 1 October 2015, participants in the United States-led anti-ISIL coalition called on Russia to curtail its air campaign in Syria, saying the airstrikes had hit Syrian opposition groups and civilians. Such strikes would "only fuel more extremism", the statement issued by the United States, UK, Turkey and other coalition members declared. "We call on the Russian Federation to immediately cease its attacks on the Syrian opposition and civilians and to focus its efforts on fighting ISIL." United States President Barack Obama, at a news conference on 2 October, underscored the coalition statement by saying the Russian action was driving moderate opposition groups underground, and would result in "only strengthening" ISIL.

In 2017, the Inter-parliamentary Assembly of the Community for Democracy and Rights of Nations, an international organization consisting of the only partially recognized republics Abkhazia, South Ossetia and Transnistria, adopted a joint statement in which supported the policy of the Russian Federation in Syria.

==== National governments ====
Armenia provided support for the Russian operations in Syria by providing operational and logistical support. As a member of the CSTO, Armenia supported the Russian military intervention.

Belarus, also a member of the CSTO, supported the Russian military intervention in Syria, said the country's acting foreign minister Vladimir Makei in October 2015.

China reacted positively to Russia's military intervention in Syria. The Chinese government perceives it as an element of the global fight against terrorism. China's special envoy for the crisis in Syria praised Russia's military role in the war. In August 2016, Guan Youfei, director of the Office for International Military Cooperation of China's Central Military Commission, was in Damascus and said that "China and Syria's militaries have a traditionally friendly relationship, and China's military is willing to keep strengthening exchanges and cooperation with Syria's military".

Egypt voiced support for the Russian air operation. On 3 October 2015, Foreign Minister Sameh Shoukry said the Russian entry into war in Syria was bound "to have an effect on limiting terrorism in Syria and eradicating it."

Iraq supported the Russian intervention in Syria and has permitted Russia to fly over Iraq with its war planes.

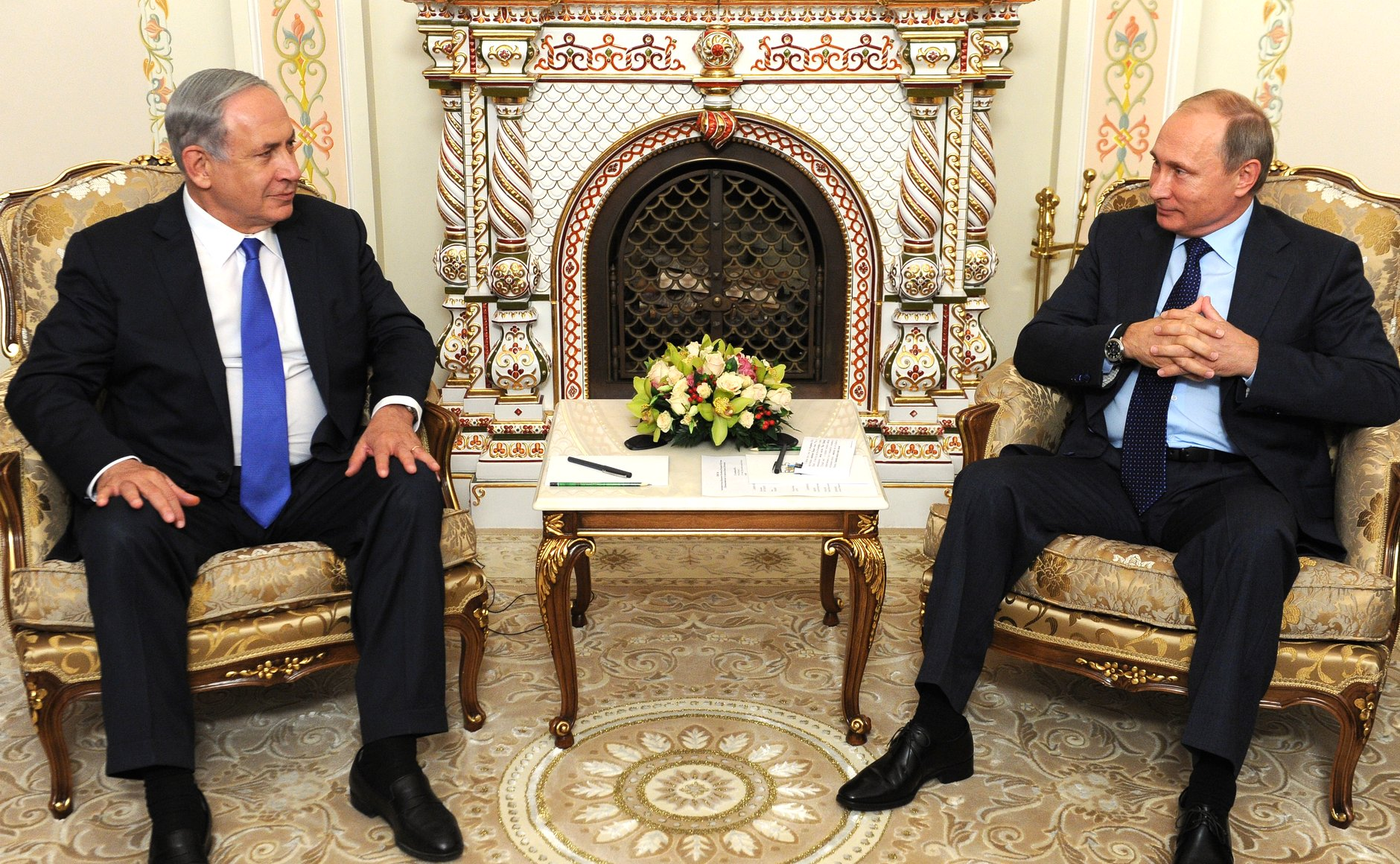
Benjamin Netanyahu meets Vladimir Putin in Moscow, 21 September 2015

Israel – Shortly prior to the Russian intervention, the Israel Defense Forces and Russian military had set up a joint working group to coordinate their Syria-related activities in the aerial, naval, and electromagnetic arenas. The Israeli government was primarily concerned about ensuring that the potential alliance between Hezbollah and Russia is not detrimental to its security. According to Zvi Magen, former ambassador to Moscow, "Israel made clear to him [Putin] that we have no real problem with Assad, just with Iran, Hezbollah and ISIS, and that message was understood." An Israeli military official stated that Israel would not shoot down any Russian aircraft which accidentally overflew Israeli territory because "Russia is not an enemy".

Jordan – On 23 October 2015, Jordan agreed to set up a "special working mechanism" in Amman to coordinate military actions with Russia in Syria. Russian foreign minister, Sergey Lavrov called for continued expansion of the alliance, saying "We think that other states that participate in the anti- terrorist fight can join this mechanism as well."

Kyrgyzstan – Kyrgyz President Almazbek Atambayev said that his country (also a member of the CSTO) supports the intervention.

Russia – Russia's Ministry of Defence described the intervention as "eliminating terrorists in the Syrian Arab Republic" and awarded their medal "Participant of the military operation in Syria" to e.g. Tu-22M3 crews returning from bombing missions in Syria.

Saudi Arabia – On 1 October 2015, Saudi Arabia's senior diplomat at the UN demanded that Russia cease its intervention, repeating statements made by Western diplomats that Russia was targeting the unnamed "moderate" anti-government opposition rather than ISIL.

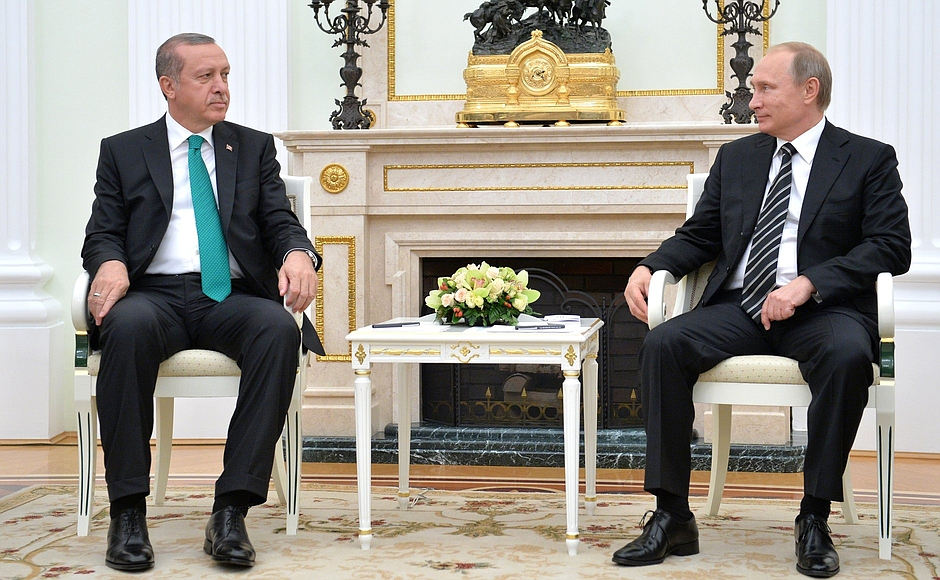
Erdoğan visited Moscow to discuss Syria and to attend the opening of the newly built Cathedral Mosque, 23 September 2015

Turkey – President Recep Tayyip Erdoğan, after a series of reported violations of the country's airspace by Russian military aircraft in early October 2015, warned that Russia's military operation in Syria could jeopardise the bilateral ties between the countries. On 23 December, co-leader of Turkey's pro-Kurdish Peoples' Democratic Party Selahattin Demirtaş criticized Ankara's stance regarding a Russian jet shot down by Turkey in November 2015.

United Arab Emirates – Initially, the UAE did not comment on the Russian intervention. Foreign Minister Anwar Mohammed Qarqash later expressed support for the intervention, saying they were against a "common enemy".

United Kingdom – Prime Minister David Cameron said "It's absolutely clear that Russia is not discriminating between ISIL and the legitimate Syrian opposition groups and, as a result, they are actually backing the butcher Assad and helping him". British troops will be sent to the Baltic states and Poland following Russia's intervention in Syria "to respond to any further provocation and aggression".

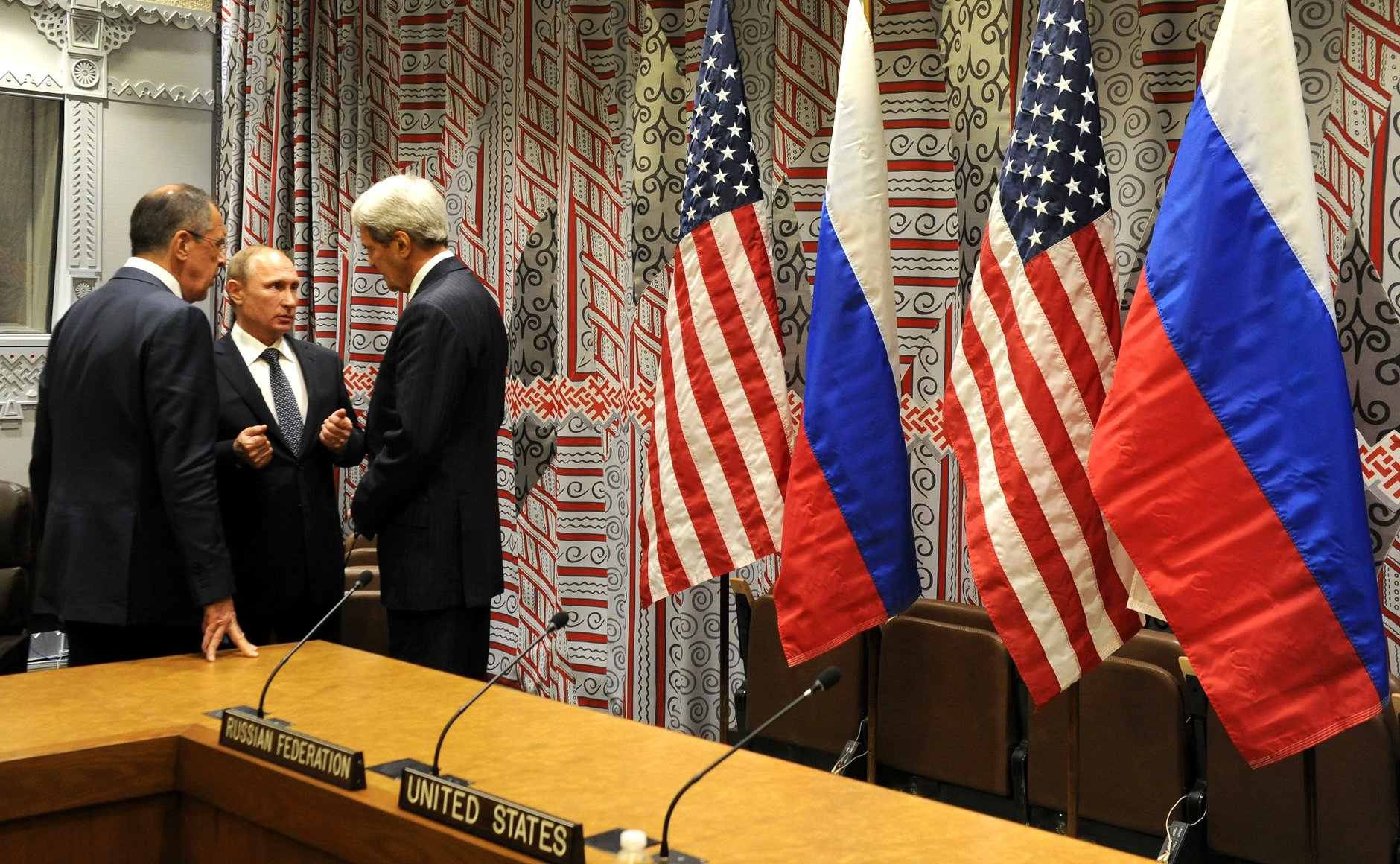
Russian and American representatives meet to discuss the situation in Syria on 29 September 2015

United States – In early October 2015, President Barack Obama was reported to have authorised the resupply—against ISIL—of 25,000 Syrian Kurds and 5,000 of the armed-Syrian opposition, emphasising that the United States would continue this support now that Russia had joined the conflict.

The U.S. ruled out military cooperation with Russia in Syria. Secretary of Defense Ashton Carter and other senior U.S. officials said Russia's campaign was primarily aimed at propping up Assad, whom Obama has repeatedly called upon to leave power. On 8 October 2015, he said, at a meeting of NATO defence ministers in Brussels, that Russia would soon start paying the price for its military intervention in Syria in the form of reprisal attacks and casualties. He added that he expected "in the next few days the Russians will begin to lose in Syria." He further said Russia's campaign was primarily aimed at propping up Assad.
On 9 October, the Obama administration abandoned its efforts to build up a new rebel force inside Syria to combat the Islamic State, acknowledging the failure of its $500 million campaign to train thousands of fighters and announcing that it will instead use the money to provide ammunition and some weapons for groups already engaged in the battle.

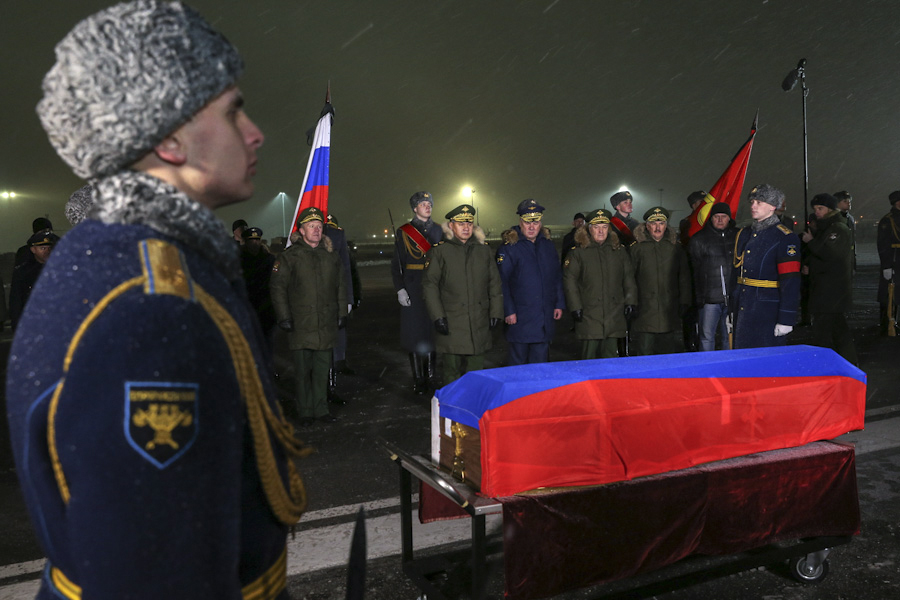
The body of the pilot of the Russian Su-24 that was shot down by Turkey at Chkalovsky Airport in Russia, 30 November 2015

On 24 November, Obama said that Turkey "has a right to defend its territory and its airspace" after it shot down a Russian bomber for reportedly violating Turkish airspace for 17 seconds, near the Syrian border. Obama also said "[Russians] are going after moderate opposition that are supported by not only Turkey but a wide range of countries." Syrian government forces supported by the Russian air force were fighting against an alliance that included the Turkish-backed Syrian Turkmen Brigades and al-Qaeda's Syrian affiliate the al-Nusra Front.

=== Militias and religious agents ===
Representatives of the Kurdish YPG and PYD expressed their support for Russian air strikes against Islamic State, al-Nusra Front and Ahrar al-Sham. Russia's Sputnik News cited YPG commander Sipan Hemo urging for Russian help in weaponry and for the cooperation with Russia in the War against Islamic State. Shortly after the Russian air strikes started, Salih Muslim, co-chair of the PYD, has said in an interview that "America will object because [Jabhat] al-Nusra and Ahrar al-Sham are no different than Daesh. They are all terrorist organizations and share the same radical mentality." At the same time Salih Muslim opposed Russian support to the Ba'athist regime, stating:

"as far as Assad remaining in power, we think differently. Assad cannot remain in power as before. He may stay on during a transition period, during a period of dialogue between the conflicting parties, but in the long term it seems inconceivable that the majority of the Syrian people would accept his leadership anymore."

On 30 September, Russian Orthodox Church spokesman Vsevolod Chaplin, said the fight against terrorism was a "moral fight, a holy fight if you will". According to The Washington Post, "Russian Muslims are split regarding the intervention in Syria, but more are pro- than anti-war." Numerous politicians, journalists, religious leaders, intellectuals and human rights activists across the Arab World have condemned Russian Orthodox Church's framing of Putin's military intervention as a "holy war", drawing parallels with medieval Crusades. Attacking the ROC leadership, writer Saad al-Din stated: "The Orthodox Church supports Putin's crimes and massacres in Syria and considers it a holy war... it is not a church that considers fighting the children of Syria a holy war, but rather a moral and political brothel."

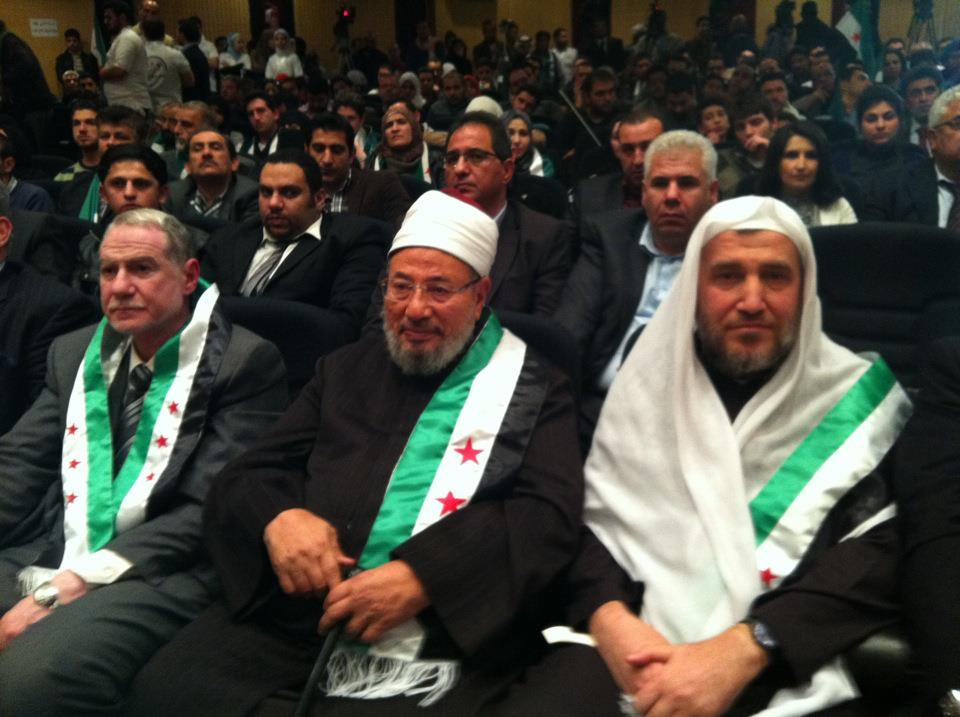
Influential scholar Yusuf al-Qaradawi (centre) became a fervent opponent of Russia after its support of the Assad regime. As early as 2012, Qaradawi condemned Russian government as the "first enemy of Islam" and campaigned for an international boycott of the country.

The Free Syrian Army's "Homs Liberation Movement" threatened suicide bombings against Russian forces in Syria. Syrian Turkmen Brigades, a Turkmen opposition militia allied with the Free Syrian Army stated that Russian air forces conducted simultaneous air strikes against Turkmen villages and positions in the Turkmen Mountain area. More than 40 civilian casualties were reported in one incident.

Over 40 anti-government groups, including factions such as Ahrar al-Sham, Jaysh al-Islam and the Levant Front, were reported, on 5 October, to have vowed to attack Russian forces in retaliation for Moscow's air campaign. Syrian Islamist fighters denounced Russian Orthodox Church's declaration of "holy war" as evidence for Russia waging a "war on Islam" in vengeance for past wars in Afghanistan and Chechnya. Influential cleric Yusuf al-Qaradawi, chairman of International Union for Muslim Scholars, stated:

"If we defend our homelands and our homes in the name of Islam, which we believe in, we are accused of terrorism, yet Russia is bombing Syria and the opposition under the auspices of holy war. Who blessed Russia for the bombing of Syria? Was it blessed by God, Christ, or the texts of the Bible? This is a cursed and reprehensible war in the name of religions, laws, morals, and covenants."

A few days ago, the Russian Duma declared that Russia would remain permanently in Syria, and that the Russian bases in Syria are there to stay. The Russians will not return to their country. I'd like to remind you that when the Russians first entered Syria, I called it an invasion. This is a Crusader invasion of our countries. All the Muslims must confront this invasion, and drive the invaders - Russians or others - out of their countries. Some people say: "The Russians are here to help us." Oh, no. They are not here to serve you. You are the servant, not they. I repeat: The Muslims must drive out the invaders, and especially the Russian invaders. Let no one deceive you. This is not a Sunni-Shiite war. It is not a war between Muslims. This is a war against Muslims - Sunnis and Shiites alike... This is not a sectarian war. It is a Western war.

— Lebanese Shi'ite cleric Subhi al-Tufayli

Fifty-five Saudi religious scholars signed a statement against the Russian intervention, first addressing the Russians as "Oh Russians, oh extremist people of the Cross", reminding them of the Soviet invasion of Afghanistan and addressing Orthodox Russia as the heir of the Soviet Communists, stating they were "supporting the Nusayri regime" and invading "Muslim Syria", stating the leaders of the Russian Orthodox Church were waging an anti-Muslim "Crusade" and telling them they will meet the fate of the Soviet Union and suffer "a shameful defeat in the Levant". The statement also addressed "Our people in the Levant", telling the able-bodied and those who are able to contribute to join the "Jihad" instead of emigrating. The statement also called for all factions against the government in Syria to unite. Further, addressing "Arab and Muslim countries", telling them that there is a "real war against Sunnis and their countries and identity" at the hands of the "Western-Russian and Safavid and Nusayri alliance", calling for the termination of all relations with Iran and Russia with Muslim countries and to "protect the land and people of the Levant from the influence of the Persians and Russians", especially calling upon Qatar, Turkey, and Saudi Arabia to support the Levant.

In addition to Sunni scholars, major Shi'i clerics have also sharply denounced the Russian intervention in Syria; labelling it as a Crusader invasion. Influential Lebanese Shi'ite cleric Subhi al-Tufayli, estranged founder and first Secretary-General of Hezbollah during 1980s, urged Muslims to resist Russian invaders the same way the Palestinians defend themselves from Zionist occupation. He also vehemently denounced Hezbollah for aiding the Russian expansionist agenda, which also threatened Lebanon.

The Muslim Brotherhood of Syria issued a statement declaring Jihad against Russia obligatory (Fard 'ayn) upon all who are able to carry weapons. They cited the Russian Orthodox Church's call of the operation as a Holy War. Photos of Uyghur fighters of the Turkistan Islamic Party were released with captions in Arabic that said "standing up strongly to the Nusayri army and the Russians." (المجاهدين التركستانيين يتصدى بقوة للجيش النصيري ومن قبل الروس).

Emblem of Saudi and Turkish supported Army of Conquest, an Islamist coalition which consisted of Al-Nusra Front

Al-Qaeda's now-defunct Syrian affiliate al-Nusra Front once declared a reward for the seizure of Russian soldiers of LS 2,500,000 (approximately US$13,000) in 2015. Abu Ubaid Al-Madani, who speaks Russian, released a video addressed to the Russians warning that they would massacre Russian soldiers. Ahmed al-Sharaa described the Russian intervention as an imperialist Crusade and incited retaliatory attacks against Russian civilians by Muslims in post-Soviet states in response to Russian bombing of Syrian civilians. He also called for bringing the battle to Alawite villages in coastal Syria in response to the extensive targeting of Sunni Muslims by the Alawite-dominated Ba'athist regime with Russian support. The Syria-based, AQ-linked Saudi cleric Abdallah Muhammad Al-Muhaysini threatened that Syria would be a "tomb for its invaders" or "graveyard for invaders" in response to the Russian intervention and brought up the Soviet–Afghan War. Muhaysini had foreign fighters of multiple backgrounds repeated the phrase "The Levant is the graveyard of the Russians", in a video message.

The Islamic State of Iraq and the Levant declared Jihad upon the Russians in a recorded vocal communiqué by Abu Mohammed al-Adnani. On 12 November, ISIL published via its media branch, al-Hayat Media Center a music video in which they threatened that they would attack Russia very soon and "blood would spill like an ocean".

== See also ==
- List of aviation shootdowns and accidents during the Syrian Civil War - That include Russian aircraft lost during the Syrian Civil War.
- Military history of the Russian Federation
- Humanitarian aid provided by Russia during the War in Syria
- Russian Armed Forces casualties in Syria
- Timeline of the Syrian Civil War (August–December 2015)
- War in Afghanistan (2001–2021)
- Russo-Ukrainian war (2022–present)
