= 2020 Kafr Takharim airstrike =

Airstrike during the Syrian civil war

Kafr Takharim airstrike
- Part of the Russian intervention in the Syrian civil war
- Location: Kafr Takharim, Idlib Governorate, Syria
- Target: Military training camp run by Faylaq al-Sham
- Date: 26 October 2020
- Executed by: Russian Air Force
- Casualties: 78–105 fighters killed 100+ fighters wounded 90 fighters injured

The 2020 Kafr Takharim airstrike occurred on 26 October 2020 when the Russian Air Force targeted a training camp run by Faylaq al-Sham, an Islamist Syrian rebel group backed by Turkey, near the town of Kafr Takharim, around 10 kilometers from the Turkish border. At the time of the attack, there were over 180 rebels in the camp. At least 78 people were killed and over 100 were wounded.

== Attack ==
According to the Syrian Observatory for Human Rights, the target site was a training camp that was bombed, while dozens of fighters were being trained before being transferred to Azerbaijan. The Russian Defense Ministry refused to comment on the incident.

The attack inflicted the highest number of casualties since the Russian-Turkish ceasefire that ended the Northwestern Syria offensive in March 2020. Director of the Syrian Observatory for Human Rights, Rami Abdel Rahman called it the fiercest attack against the Sham Legion since the Russian military intervention in September 2015.

Sources close to the Syrian government put the death toll at 200 dead and wounded.

On 1 November 2020, the Syrian Observatory for Human Rights updated the number of casualties to 79 dead and dozens wounded.

According to Youssef Hammoud, a spokesman for the groups, leaders of the camp were among those killed in the air strike. Theories suggest that 4chan may have been involved by giving the Russians the location of the camp after a video of the camp was posted to YouTube.

== Response ==
Syrian rebel factions launched a massive artillery attack on Syrian Arab Army positions on 27 October 2020, killing 15 soldiers; one rebel was killed in the return bombardment. The following day, another Syrian soldier was killed as rebels continued shelling SAA positions in Idlib province.

== Analysis ==
According to international observers, the targeted Russian attack on the Sham Legion was a "message" to Turkey. Director of the U.S.-based Middle East Institute Charles Lister told Al Jazeera that as the militia group was Turkey’s closest proxy in Idlib province, this "wasn't a Russian attack on the Syrian opposition as much as it was a direct hit against – and message to – Turkey". He added that it was possible that wider geopolitics had pushed Russia to strike, referring to the deployment by Turkey of Syrian militants to Libya and to the area of the Nagorno-Karabakh war.

== Reactions ==
On 27 October 2020, the U.S. special envoy for Syria James Jeffrey criticized the Russian attack and accused "the Assad regime and its Russian and Iranian allies of threatening the stability of the surrounding region, by continuing their quest for a military victory". He also stated "the attack was a dangerous escalation by the Assad government and apparent violation of the March 5 Idlib cease-fire agreement" and urged Assad and its allies to end their "needless, brutal war against the Syrian people".

The National Front for Liberation released a statement announcing the death of a "large number" of its fighters by Russian strikes and said it would not hesitate to retaliate. NLF spokesman Sayf Raad denounced the "Russian aircraft and regime forces continuously violating the Turkish-Russian deal in targeting military positions, villages and towns".

On 28 October 2020, in a parliamentary speech in Ankara, Turkish President Recep Tayyip Erdoğan condemned the attack on a site of the Turkish-backed Free Syrian Army, saying that Russia’s attack indicated its unwillingness to achieve a lasting peace in the region.

== See also ==
- 2020 Balyun airstrikes
