= Kafr Takharim =

Kafar Takharim كفر تخاريم
- Town
- Location within Syria
- Coordinates: 36°6′59″N 36°30′53″E
- Country: Syria
- Governorate: Idlib
- District: Harem
- Subdistrict: Kafar Takharim
- Control: Syrian transitional government

Population (2004)
  - Total: 10,084
- Time zone: UTC+2 (EET)
  - Summer (DST): UTC+3 (EEST)

Kafr Takharim (Arabic: كَفْر تَخَارِيم, romanized: Kafr Takhārīm, also spelled Kafar Takhareem or Kfar Takharam) is a town in northwestern Syria, administratively part of the Idlib Governorate, located in the north of Idlib. Nearby localities include Harem to the north, Salqin to the northwest, Abu Talha to the west and Armanaz to the south. According to the Syria Central Bureau of Statistics, Kafr Takharim had a population of 10,084 in the 2004 census. The town is also the administrative center of the Kafr Takharim nahiyah which consists of nine villages with a combined population of 14,772. Its inhabitants are predominantly Sunni Muslims.

There are several opinions about its name. The first: Father Shalhat believes that its name is from Aramaic and its origin is (Kafr Harma) meaning: the village of Harem. Harem is from Aramaic and means: sanctuary, prohibition and vow. As for the meaning of (Dahrma), the letter dal is an addition tool, and (Harma) means to deviate from the path taken. As for the second opinion: as some of its people claim: that its name came from (Kaf al-Khairin). As for the third opinion: that its name is from Kafr Takharim, and this word is composed of two parts: (Kafr) which means farm, and (Takharim) which is the plural of Takhrim, which is the cleft or cut, and its plural is Takharim. Thus, its name becomes: (the farm of the valleys). This applies to the reality of its topography completely.

== History ==
Ibrahim Hananu, the Syrian nationalist who led the anti-French resistance in the Aleppo region in 1919, was born in Kafr Takharim. The town, which Hananu had represented in the Syrian National Congress, would serve as a base for his revolt. In 1958 Kafr Takharim's municipal council was replaced by a government-appointed municipal committee.

Kafr Takharim has seen anti-government demonstrations and has experienced violence many times during the ongoing Syrian uprising against the government of Bashar al-Assad. On 1 August 2011 opposition activists from the Local Coordination Committees of Syria reported that over 175 people in the town were arrested and publicly beaten before being sent to the prisons of various security branches during house raids carried out by security forces and pro-government militia. On 1 October 2012, three rebels were reportedly killed in Kafr Takharim during armed clashes with the Syrian Army.

On 26 October 2020, Russian warplanes targeted a training camp of Faylaq al-Sham, a Turkish-backed rebel group, near Kafr Takharim. The strike killed at least 78 fighters and wounded more than 100. The head of the Syrian Observatory for Human Rights called the strike the heaviest attack since the beginning of the ceasefire.

== Notable people ==
- Hassan Hamada (*1968), Deputy Chief of Staff of the Syrian Air Force since 9 October 2025

== Bibliography ==
- Boulanger, Robert, ed. (1966). The Middle East, Lebanon, Syria, Jordan, Iraq, Iran. Hachette.
- Gelvin, James L. (1999). Divided Loyalties: Nationalism and Mass Politics in Syria at the Close of Empire. University of California Press. ISBN 0520210700.
