= Roman Theatre at Palmyra =

Ancient Roman theater in Palmyra, Syria

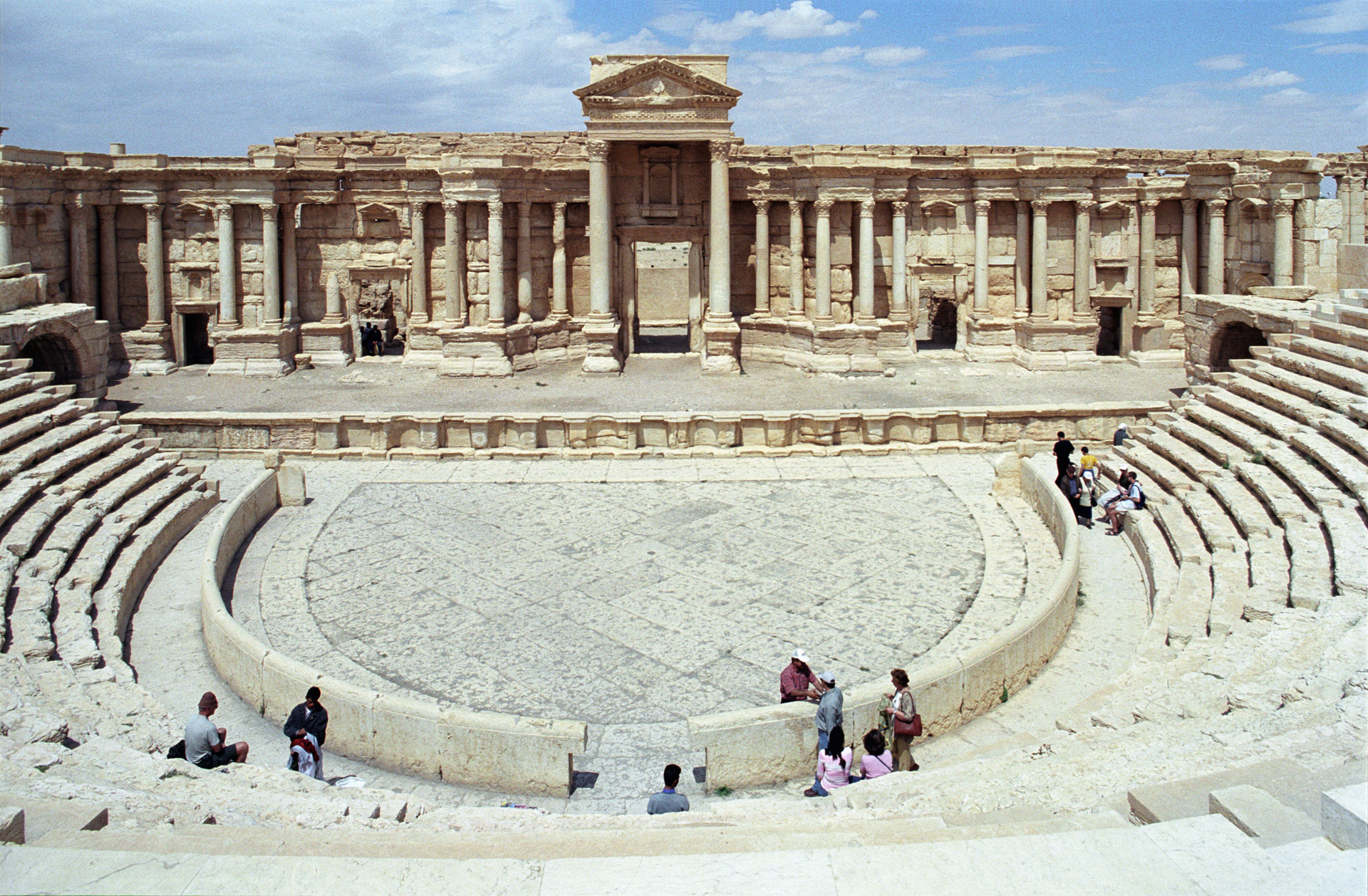
- Overview of the theatre in 2007
- Interactive map of Roman Theatre at Palmyra
- 34.550768°N 38.268761°E
- Type: Roman theatre
- Periods: Roman, Palmyrene
- Cultures: Roman, Palmyrene
- Location: Palmyra, Syria

History
- Built: Second century AD

Site notes
- Material: ashlar stones
- Width: 92 metres (302 ft)
- Condition: Largely intact
- Owner: Public
- Public access: Inaccessible (in a war zone)

UNESCO World Heritage Site
- Type: Cultural
- Criteria: i, ii, iv
- Designated: 1980 (4th session)
- Part of: Site of Palmyra
- Reference no.: 23
- Region: Arab States
- Endangered: 2013–present

The Roman Theatre at Palmyra (Arabic: مسرح تدمر, romanized: Masraḥ Tadmur, lit. 'Palmyra Theatre') is a Roman theatre in ancient Palmyra in the Syrian Desert. The unfinished theatre dates back to the second-century CE Severan period. The theatre's remains have since been restored. It was occupied by the Islamic State of Iraq and the Levant (ISIL) in May 2015 and recaptured by the government forces in March 2016 with the support of Russian airstrikes.

== Overview ==
The second-century CE theatre was built in the centre of a semicircular colonnaded piazza which opens up to the South Gate of Palmyra. The 82-by-104-metre (269 by 341 ft) piazza was located to the south-west of the main colonnaded street. The unfinished cavea is 92 metres (302 ft) in diameter and consists of only an ima cavea, the lowest section of the cavea, immediately surrounding the orchestra. The ima cavea is organized into eleven cunei of twelve rows each and faces north-northeast towards the cardo maximus. The theatre's aditus maximi, its main entrances, are 3.5 metres (11 ft) wide and lead to a stone-paved orchestra with a diameter of 23.5 metres (77 ft). The orchestra is bounded by a circular wall with a diameter of 20.3 metres (67 ft).

The proscenium wall is decorated with ten curved and nine rectangular niches placed alternately. The stage measures 45.5 by 10.5 metres (149 by 34 ft) and is accessed by two staircases. The scaenae frons had five doors: the main entrance, or valve regia, built into a broad curved niche; two guest doors on either side of the valve regia, or valve hospitalis, built into shallow rectangular niches; and two extra doors, at either end of the stage. Emperor Nero is known to have placed his statue in the niche of the regia of the theatre at Palmyra. The columns at the stage are decorated in the Corinthian order.

In the 1950s the theatre was cleared from the sand and subsequently underwent restoration.

The theatre hosted folk music performances for the annual Palmyra festival.

== Partial destruction and restoration ==
=== ISIL occupation ===
The Islamic State of Iraq and the Levant (ISIL) had taken full control of Palmyra by 21 May 2015. In early July it released a graphic video showing 25 teenage members lining up 25 adult male captives dressed in dark fatigues, kneeling in front of them on the stage of the theatre. The ISIS members then executed all 25 captives simultaneously by shooting them in the head. According to the Syrian Observatory for Human Rights the executions took place on May 27. Mamoun Abdulkarim, Director of the Syrian government agency of antiquities and museums stated: "Using the Roman theatre to execute people proves that these people are against humanity."

=== Recapture by Syrian government ===
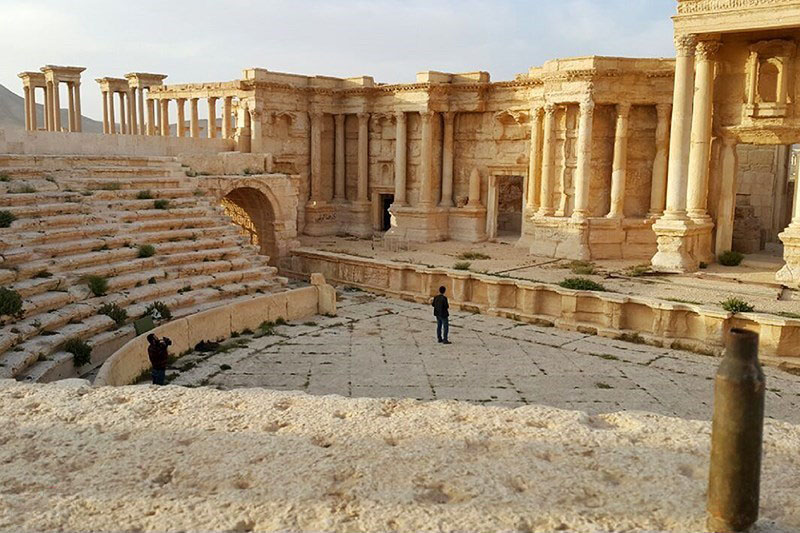
The theatre in March 2016

Following the recapture of Palmyra by the Syrian Army with Russian air support in March 2016, drone footage showed that the theatre remained largely intact.

On 5 May 2016, the 100th anniversary of Syria's Martyrs' Day, the theatre played host to two classical music concerts in remembrance of the victims of the civil war, including those executed at the site, and to celebrate its liberation. The first, a 20-minute-long concert of European and Russian classical music, was played by the Mariinsky Theatre orchestra of St. Petersburg, conducted by Valery Gergiev, with soloist Sergei Roldugin. It was dedicated to Alexander Prokhorenko, a Russian special forces soldier who had sacrificed his life near Palmyra while directing air strikes against Islamic State. Russian president Vladimir Putin addressed the concert by video link, praising the participants. The Economist wrote that Putin "did everything he could to underline the concert’s message that Russia is leading the fight for Western civilisation." The second concert, during the evening, was by a Syrian orchestra and choir. The audience included Syrian and Russian military, as well as UNESCO officials, religious leaders, journalists, and locals.

US State Department Deputy Spokesperson Mark Toner said of the event "I will never denounce an orchestra playing to the citizens of a beleaguered city. [...] it’s fine. It’s good." The British foreign secretary, Philip Hammond, called it a "tasteless attempt to distract attention from the continued suffering of millions of Syrians", referring to an alleged Russian airstrike on a refugee camp in northern Syria, which killed at least 28 civilians.

=== Second ISIL occupation: partial destruction ===
ISIL took control of Palmyra once again in December 2016. Shortly after that, they completely destroyed the façade of the theatre according to Mamoun Abdulkarim, Director of the Syrian government agency of antiquities and museums. Syrian authorities reported that satellite images showed signs of intentional destruction. Mikhail Piotrovsky, a scholar of Arabic and the director of the Hermitage Museum, argued that it was an act of reprisal. In May 2016, ISIL radio had promised to stage a new "concert" in response to the classical concert staged by Russia. Drone footage shot by the Russian Ministry of Defence showed that the theatre was partially destroyed. The proscenium, the central part of the stage, suffered severe damage. UNESCO head Irina Bokova characterized the destruction as a "war crime". Palmyra was retaken by Syrian government forces in early March 2017.

=== Restoration ===
On 23 July 2023, the Syrian Directorate-General of Antiquities and Museums and the Institute for the History of Material Culture of Russian Academy of Sciences signed an agreement to start the comprehensive restoration of the theatre. The work was completed before the end of 2023.

== Gallery ==
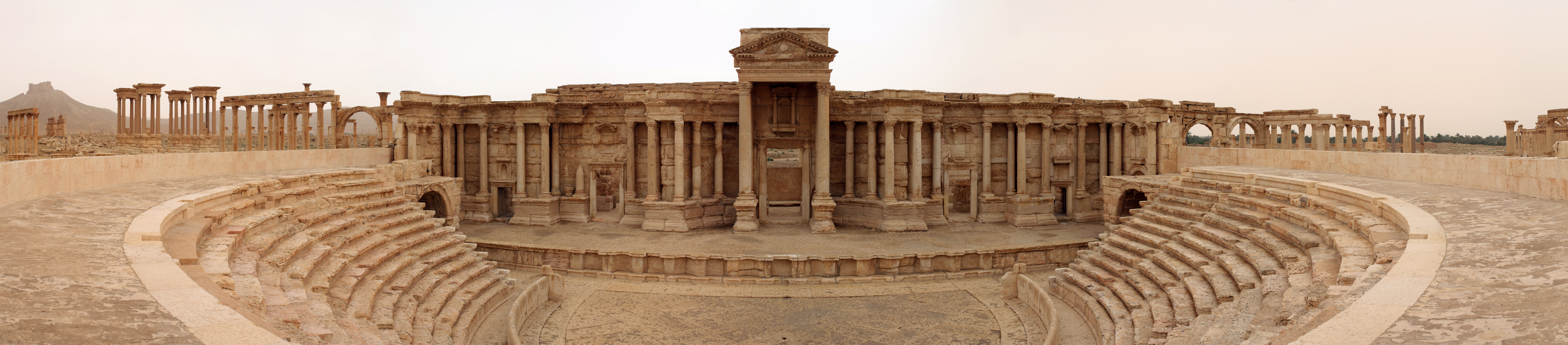
Panoramic view of the theater from the cavea in 2010

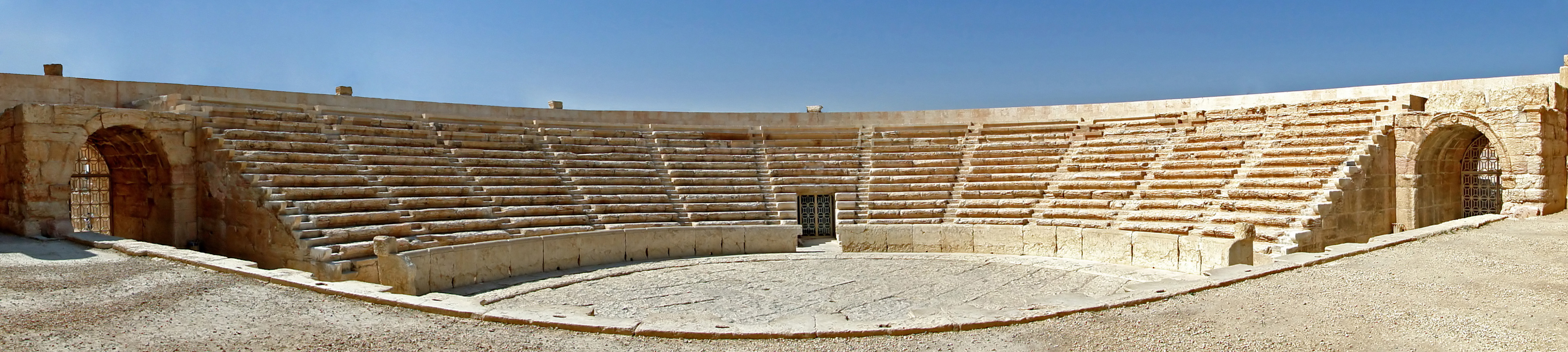
Panoramic view of the cavea from the stage in 2010

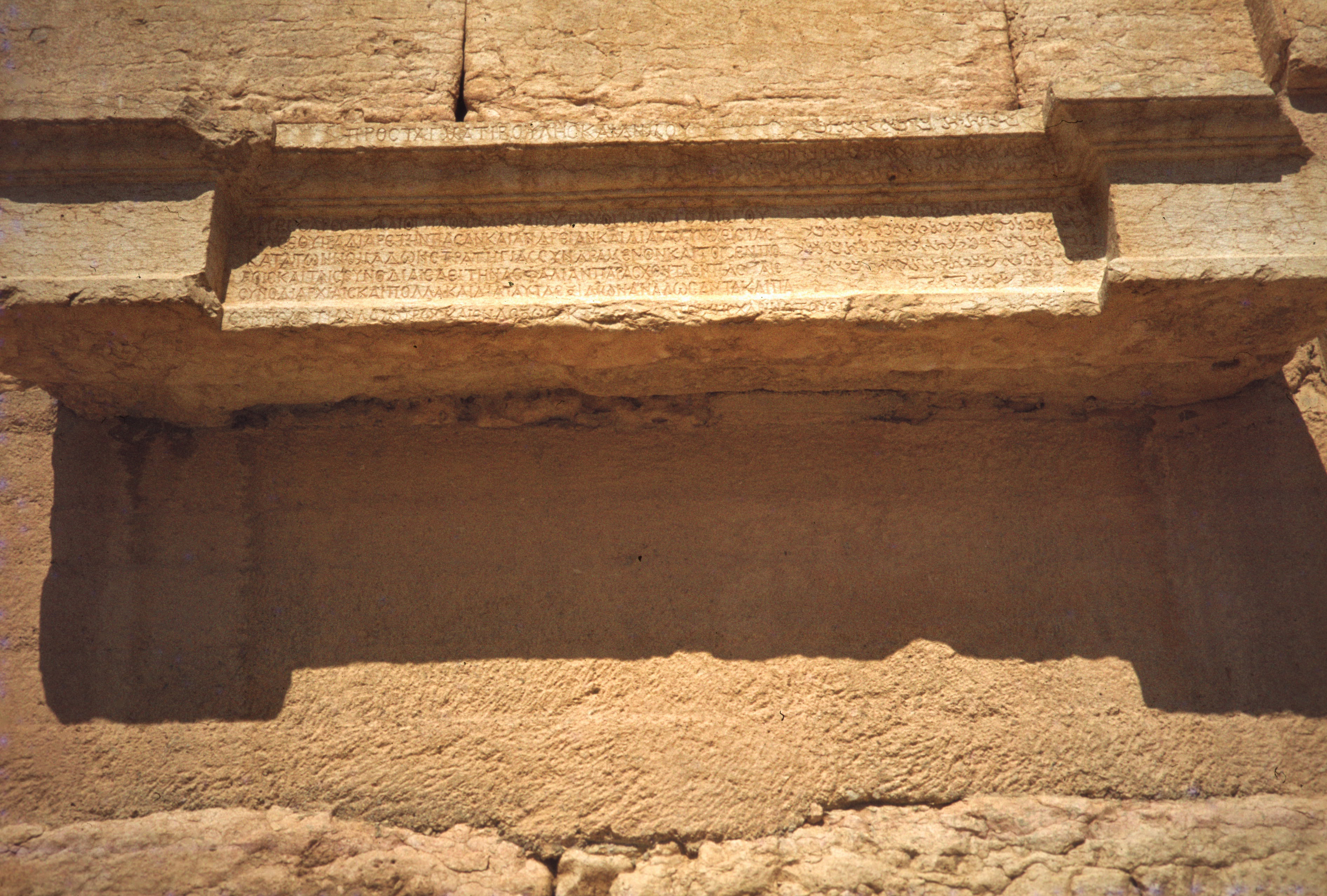
CE.1980 Registration in the theatre

== See also ==
- List of Roman theatres
