= Syrian Warfare =

2017 video game

- Developer: Cats Who Play
- Publisher: Cats Who Play
- Director: Dmitry Babkin
- Writer: Vitaly Shutov
- Platforms: Microsoft Windows (Steam / VK Play)
- Release: 21 February 2017
- Genre: Real-time tactics
- Mode: Single-player

Syrian Warfare (Russian: Сирия: Русская буря) is a 2017 real-time tactics video game developed by the Russian studio Cats who Play. The game takes place during the Syrian Civil War from the perspective of forces loyal to the government of Bashar al-Assad.

The game is a spiritual sequel to the 2008 release Warfare by GFI Russia, where players take control of the United States Army and Marine Corps against a fictional terrorist group which was taken control of Saudi Arabia.

== Gameplay ==
=== Mechanics ===
Soldiers associated with the player character Anwar's unit pass from mission to mission, gaining experience and equipment as they progress. The player selects the composition of the unit, as well as reinforcements and the distribution of equipment. Trophy weapons and equipment may be used during the game.

Troops and equipment do not have health bars, with dynamic damage calculation taking place depending on the equipment type. Ammunition and fuel supplies are also limited.

The game features destructible environments, allowing for the use of armoured or close air support to aid in clearing areas.

Between missions, the play can read Anwar's personal diary, as well as the social networking service "Social Spider", a fictional analogue to the popular blogging platform LiveJournal. The service approximates the social media coverage of the conflict, ranging from Russian opposition bloggers hoping for a repeat of Libya and anticipating the blowback on Moscow, to posts from Syrians fleeing the country as refugees.

=== Factions ===
Units of Syrian Warfare
Friendly	Opposing
Syrian Police	Jabhat al-Nusra
Syrian Arab Armed Forces	Islamic State of Iraq and Syria
Russian Armed Forces	
Lebanese Volunteers (Return to Palmyra)	
National Defence Forces (Return to Palmyra)	

== Plot ==
=== Main Plot ===
The player takes control of the central protagonist Anwar Amin (callsign Falcon-4), an officer in the Public Security Police stationed in a small, quiet town before the war.

To Anwar, the civil war feels distant - something only "seen on the TV screen", allowing him to take leave to visit relatives in Lebanon. Upon returning, the conflict has erupted in his home town. Rebel forces, aided by Wahid, the defected police chief of a neighbouring town, organise an attack on Anwar's police chief Wazir. Wahid had offered Wazir a change to join his side, boasting about funds, weapons and endless support from abroad (including a monologue about the government falling and potential reprisals against minorities). Wazir refuses and is killed. Anwar and the police squad organise a desperate defence of the police station, repelling VBIEDs and technicals until re-enforced by a quick reaction force of the Syrian Arab Army.

From here Anwar's squad evolves from a small police unit into a battle-hardened Syrian Army force fighting across major battlefields. Early missions begin with small-scale defence and incursions, rapidly escalating into combined-arms operations involving tanks, helicopters, strike aircraft and CQB, including depictions of real-world events. Key missions include:

- Anti insurgency operations in the suburbs of Damascus, against rebel forces backed by the United States.
- Engagements against Daesh and other Islamist groups, with missions involving supply runs, capturing enemy positions and escorting civilians and journalists.
- Conducting a combat search and rescue operation for a downed Russian pilot near the Turkish border, alongside Russian forces.
- Assisting Russian Spetsnaz units in capturing an Islamist foreign fighter from the Caucasus.
- Advance on the ancient city of Palmyra against Daesh, amidst a surrounded forward air controller team which calls in an airstrike on its own position.

Following the capture of Palmyra, Anwar is once again confronted by Wahid, stating that "enlightened and cultured" Europeans would never accept Anwar, and by extension the Assad regime, as opposed to a freedom fighter such as him. Wahid manages to escape.

Anwar's story ends with the successful capture of Palmyra, reminiscing while the Mariinsky Theatre Orchestra performs an orchestral concert in the cities Roman amphitheatre.

=== Return to Palmyra ===
The player takes command of the Tiger Forces, the premier special forces unit of the Syrian Arab Army. Caught off-guard by a sudden Daesh offensive against Palmyra, the unit conducts a tactical retreat towards the T-4 air base, before launching a counteroffensive to retake the city alongside Lebanese volunteers and the National Defence Forces, with the Russian Aerospace Forces providing support.

=== Battlefields ===
Anwar, along with his reconnaissance platoon, returns to his home town amidst an Al-Nusra offensive towards the town. The unit is assisted by the arrival of the Tiger Forces, although the latter is themselves pursued by Daesh. Anwar devises a risky plan to force Al-Nusra and Daesh into fighting each other. As a result, the offensive actions of the two groups fails, allowing loyalist forces to reclaim the town.

The game culminates in Anwar's confrontation with Wahid, at the same site where Wazir was killed years earlier. Wahid is indignant and smug, stating that his men have unlimited access to weapons, money and foreign support, which would enact bitter revenge when the new government takes power. Wahid detonates a suicide vest, killing him and injuring Anwar. For Anwar, the ending is bittersweet, revenge has been enacted and his home town is freed, but at great personal cost.

== Development ==
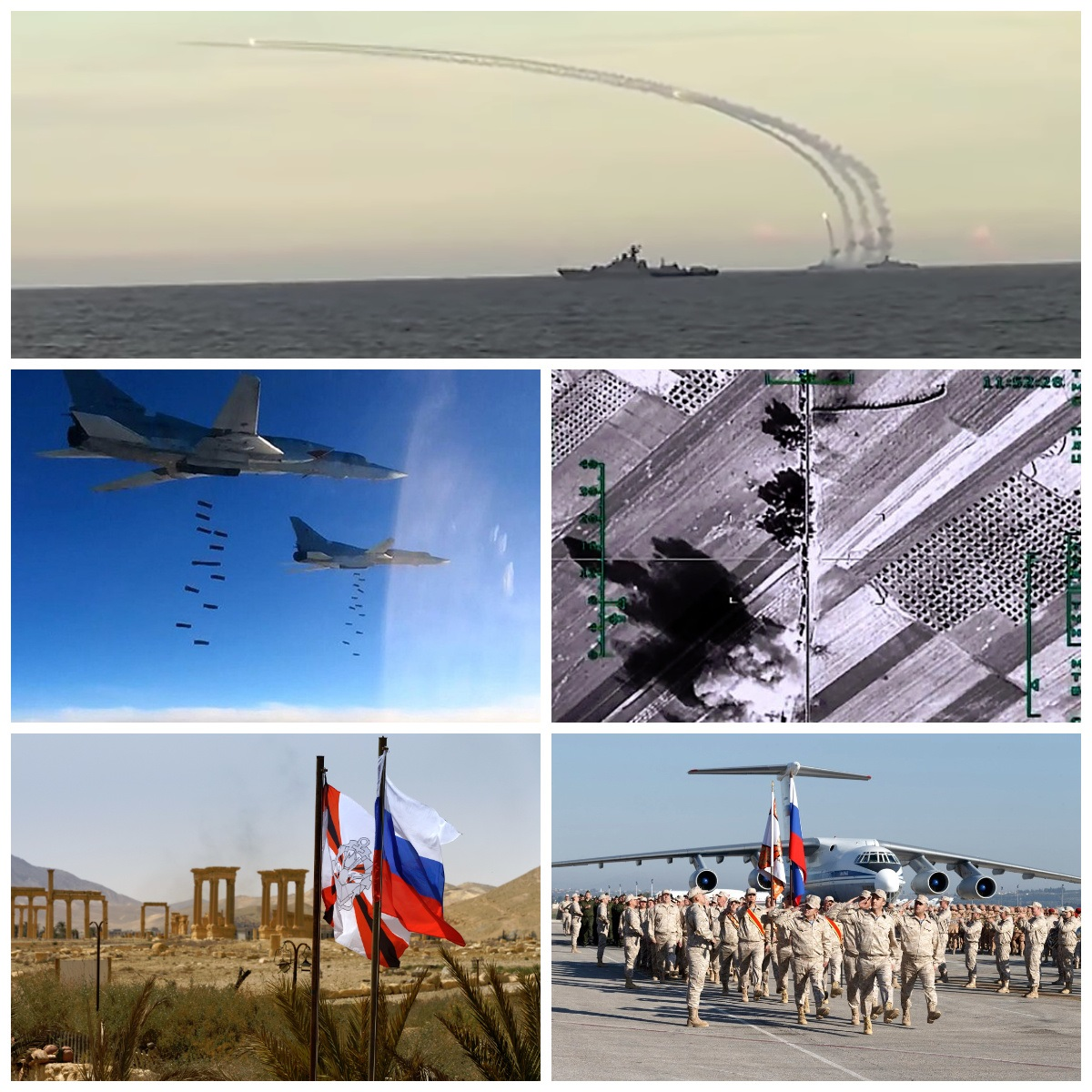
Photomontage of Russian Intervention in the Syrian Civil War

Syrian Warfare was developed by Cats Who Play, founded in Russia in 2005 by former members of GFI Russia, who had previously worked on titles such as Warfare (2008). The game was written by Vitaly Shutov, and directed by Dmitry Babkin. The concept for the game originated in October 2015, based on the reporting of military correspondents during the Syrian civil war.

Development began in December of the same year, with the games Warhammer: Dark Omen, Combat Mission, Counter Action and Company of Heros cited as inspiration.

The project made use of publicly available materials, with military consultants not employed during development.

The game was released under the Steam Greenlight program. The project was additionally funded through Boomstarter and Indiegogo. Due to a lack of additional funding, the game did not receive native ports for Mac OS and Linux.

== Release ==
Syrian Warfare released on 21 February 2017 for Microsoft Windows on Steam.

In March 2017, the game was unexpectedly removed from Steam due to a false copyright claim originating from the Czech Republic, impersonating as a representative of GFI Russia. Shortly after, the game was restored to the store. Cats Who Play clarified that while carrying the same naming convention of the 2008 release Warfare, the game was built from scratch following a failure to acquire the rights to the game.

In 2022, the game was also released on VK Play for the CIS market. The game was localised in English, Russian, German and Chinese.

On 30 October 2017, the DLC Return to Palmyra was released, covering the 2016 ISIS Palmyra offensive and 2017 Syrian Army Palmyra offensive. Additional unit types such as Kamov Ka-52 and Aérospatiale Gazelle helicopters for allied forces, as well as HMMWV's, BGM-71 TOW launchers and VBIEDs for opposing forces were also added. In addition, enemy mechanics were expanded to include improved situational awareness and countermeasures.

On 22 October 2018, the second DLC Battlefields was released, including new missions covering the Kuweires offensive and Operation Damascus Steel. The release also included a suite of tools for creating and editing missions with Steam Workshop integration.

== Reception ==
=== Reviews ===
Mail.ru included Syrian Warfare in their list of best games of the month in March 2017, later leaving a review where the game was highly rated with a score of 8.0 out of 10. The review was positive, comparing the game a successor to others in the genre such as Sudden Strike or Blitzkrieg, recommending it for fans of "man-over-machine" tactics while warning that the games difficulty and political tone would not be for everyone.

Riot Pixels positively reviewed the game and the Return to Palmyra expansion, giving it a score of 77/100 praising the games use of historical real-world events, attention to detail and plot, while noting the games simple graphics and user interface, the lack of multiplayer as well as minor bugs. In the annual community rankings for 2017 on Riot Pixels, the game placed in third place for best strategy game, after Endless Space 2 and Total War: Warhammer 2, while Return To Palmyra placed second for best expansion following XCOM 2: War of the Chosen.

Zone of Games generally praises the game as a high-quality real-time tactics game, that succeeds due to its solid mechanics, even if its political outlook and technical quirks may put off some players.

The game was moderately positively reviewed by Sean Couture of Wargamer, comparing Syrian Warfare to titles such as World in Conflict. Couture states that despite some flaws in the game characteristic of similar games from the late 2000s, the result is "an alright tactical wargame" with the potential to improve. While the games Pro-Russian narrative is clearly noticeable, but acknowledges that the video game market is already full of titles that glorify American interventionism.

In 2017, Syrian Warfare took ninth place in the IndieDB Indie of the Year Top 10 results.

Syrian Warfare was praised by the Russian media critic BadComedian as an example of a successful domestic video game, alongside others such as Escape from Tarkov, Pathfinder: Kingmaker and HighFleet.

=== Sales ===
By late 2017, 23,000 copies of the game had been sold. By 2024, over 200,000 copies had been sold, with the majority of purchases from China and Russia.

== See also ==
- Six Days in Fallujah
