= Eastern Homs offensive (2017) =

Offensive

Coordinates: 34.5600°N 38.2672°E

- Part of the Syrian Civil War and the Russian military intervention in Syria
- Situation in southern Syria from 6 February to 30 April; Government advances are shown at the top of the map.
| Date | 5 March – 12 May 2017 (2 months and 1 week) |
| Location | Tadmur District, Eastern Homs Governorate, Syria |
| Result | Syrian government victory |
| Territorial changes | Syrian Army expands the buffer zone around Palmyra by capturing more than 230 square miles of territory around the city |

Belligerents
| (Syria) Syrian Arab Republic; Russia; Allied militias: Hezbollah | Islamic State of Iraq and the Levant |

Commanders and leaders
| Maj. Gen. Mohammed Hassan Sultan † (5th Corps commander); Mahmoud Wanous † (NDF commander); Ali Muhammad Beaz † (Hezbollah commander) | (Islamic State) Abu Hamid al-Sukhni † (ISIL commander) |

Units involved
| Syrian Armed Forces; Syrian Army; 10th Mechanised Division; 11th Armored Division; 18th Armoured Division; 5th Corps; Al-Assad Shield Forces; ISIL Hunters; Republican Guard; 800th Regiment; Syrian Marines; Tiger Forces; Shahin Group (until 11 February); National Defence Forces; Qalamoun Shield; Golan Regiment; Al-Shaitat tribe militias; Military Intelligence Directorate; Military Security Shield Forces; Desert Commandos Regiment; Air Force Intelligence Directorate; Fawj Nusur Homs; Syrian Air Force; Russian Armed Forces; Russian Air Force; Special operations forces advisors; Hezbollah military; Radwan Forces; Syrian Hezbollah units; Al-Ridha Forces; Al-Ghalibun; Imam Mahdi Brigade | (Islamic State) Military of ISIL |

Strength
| 4,900+ | Unknown |

The Eastern Homs offensive in 2017 was a military operation of the Syrian Arab Army and its allies in Eastern part of Homs Governorate against Islamic State of Iraq and the Levant forces during the Syrian Civil War.

== Background ==
The Syrian Army captured the Palmyra Triangle area, Palmyra Castle, Qatari Castle, and al-Amriyah village, as well as many hilltops including Jabbal Hayyal and Jabbal al-Tar after an assault on 1 March. On the same day, the Syrian army and allies backed by warplanes, had entered to the modern city of Palmyra and captured the al-Motaqadin street after captured the western and northern western sections of the city amid information about pulling back by ISIL from the city. On the next day, ISIL launched a failed counter-attack following which SAA attacked and imposed full control over Jabal al-Tar and Palmyra Castle. ISIL later withdrew from most of Palmyra, after they mined many points in the city. However, they left behind suicide bombers in the eastern districts of Palmyra, to cover the retreat of the ISIL militants, and to hamper the progress of the Syrian Army. On 2 March, the Syrian Army recaptured the entire city of Palmyra, after ISIL fully withdrew from the city. On the next day, the Syrian Army captured the Palmyra Airport, and completely secured it on 4 March, after ISIL was forced to retreat to the Palmyra Grain Silos to the east of the airport.

== The offensive ==
=== Army advances north of Palmyra; Jazal oil fields captured ===
On 5 March 2017, the Syrian Army captured all hills to the south of the Jazal oil fields, to the northwest of the city of Palmyra. They later attacked the oil fields as well, forcing ISIL to withdraw. The group set the oil fields on fire while retreating. On the next day, the Syrian army secured the entirety of the Jazal Oil Fields and captured the adjacent Jazal mountain.

On 7 March, the Syrian Army captured Al-Amriyah Mountain and the surrounding hills, securing the fire control over the Palmyra Grain Silos. On 13 March, the Syrian army captured the Palmyra Electrical Station and Sabkhat al Muh area south of the city of Palmyra. On the same day, the Syrian army captured the Palmyra Grain Silos. They also captured the Wadi al-Ahmar area furing the same day. On 14 March, the Syrian Army captured the Mustadirah Mountains in northeastern Palmyra. Later, the Syrian army captured the Mustadirah Gas Fields during the early hours.

On 15 March, the Syrian Army reached the strategic Talilah Crossroad where clashes took place. The next day, the Syrian Army captured the mountain of Jabal Mazar, the adjacent Hajjana Storage Base, Palmyra Gas Fields and officially secured all high points around the city of Palmyra.

On 17 March, the Syrian Army launched another attack on the Al-Talilah Crossroad and Al-‘Antar Mountains. Two days later, government troops captured the mountain ridge located north of the recently captured Jabal Mazar. This gave them fire-control of the nearby Al-Hurm Mountains in the northern Palmyra countryside. Later in the day, the 5th Legion of the Syrian Army also secured the Talialh Mountains some 20 kilometres south-west of Palmyra.

On 23 March, ISIL attacked one of the Syrian Army outposts to the east of Palmyra killing four soldiers. The attack was eventually repelled by the newly created elite unit ISIL Hunters who killed 24 attackers and wounded 12. An ISIL vehicle was also destroyed.

On 27 March, the Army captured four mountains and Brigade 550 Base and several other points to the north of Palmyra. These advances moved the government closer to resolving its long-standing energy crisis amid reports that ISIL had withdrawn from the Jirah and Sha’er Gas Fields not long after the Syrian Army captured the mountaintops northwest of Palmyra. It launched a new assault in the eastern countryside of Palmyra on 31 March, targeting the road to the strategic Arak gas fields. The SAA seized some points on the Palmyra-Sukhnah road during the day.

The SAA captured the Abu al-Duhur mountain in eastern Homs on 2 April. The capture of Abu al-Duhur gave them fire control over Abu Qulah dam and Wadi Al-Hissu. Jabal al-Taj was also reported to have been captured by the Syrian Army. On 4 April, they captured an area of a mountain chain north of Palmyra overlooking the Arak gas fields.

After the Tomahawk missile strike on Shayrat Air Base carried out by the United States, ISIL launched attacks on Syrian Army defenses in Palmyra, taking advantage of absence of Syrian Air Force in eastern Homs. It attacked the checkpoints outside the village of al-Furqalas, however the attack was repelled with the Homs-Palmyra road secured.

=== Army advances south of Palmyra ===
On 7 April, the Syrian Army advanced several kilometers along the M-90 highway, south of Palmyra, capturing farms, a quarry, and a racing runway. The advance cut one of ISIL's supply lines in the region. Three days later, the military captured the ISIL positions in the eastern parts of the Al-Abtar Mountains and reportedly reached the Sawwanah Junction, while pushing towards the Khunayfis Phosphate Mines. On 11 April, they advanced in the areas of Al-Abtar Mountains, Matla’ al-Sukkar and Qasr al-Halabat.

=== Renewed northern advances; al-Shaer gas fields captured ===
Amaq News Agency claimed on 14 April that ISIL had killed 11 Syrian soldiers near Sabkha al-Mawah in eastern Palmyra. On 18 April, SAA's 5th Legion along with the 18th Tank Division captured the Abu Qilla Dam.

On 24 April, the SAA led by the ISIL Hunters captured several points overlooking the al-Shaer gas fields. On 26 April, it captured al-Shawr gas fields as well as all the hills overlooking it. On 27 April, SAA led by the 5th Legion and assisted by Russian helicopters captured the abandoned Armored Battalion base, expanding on the gains made a day before when they captured Shaer Gas Fields. During the same day, the Syrian Army also took hold of entire Al-Bayda’a mountain range. On 28 April, the Army captured all of the oil wells in the Shaer Gas Fields. Government forces then started demining the gas fields which were also on fire.

=== Highway secured Homs-Palmyra; Fighting in the Shumriyah Mountains ===
On 30 April, the SAA backed by the NDF, captured six villages and two hilltops in northeastern Homs. The advance helped them in securing the Palmyra-Homs highway, the main supply line to Palmyra. ISIL carried out a counterattack on 2 May in the axis between Palmyra silos and Talilah crossroads, with Amaq claiming the group had captured several outposts and had killed 11 soldiers.

On 3 May, the SAA captured the Shumriyah Mountains, west of Palmyra, as well as three nearby villages. The next day, pro-government forces captured four positions near the Talilah crossroads. Between 6 and 10 May, the SAA captured six hilltops east of Al-Shumriyah Mountains and near the al-Shaer gas fields. On 12 May, the SAA, backed by the Russian Air Force, captured the entire Talilah area. They also captured the quarries to the east of al-Shumriyah Mountains, in addition to the Maqla’ Al-Mushairifah Al-Janoubi area, thus imposing fire control over the road linking the villages of Jubab Hamad, Rasm Hamida and Habrah Al-Gharbiyah.

== Aftermath ==
As part of an offensive to clear out both the rebels and ISIL from the southern portion of the Syrian desert, half a dozen fronts were opened by the Army, including south and east of Palmyra.

== See also ==
- Siege of Deir ez-Zor (2014–17)
- Eastern Syria campaign (September–December 2017)
- Deir ez-Zor campaign (2017–2019)
