= Alexander Prokhorenko =

Russian soldier (1990–2016)

Senior Lieutenant Alexander Prokhorenko
- Алекса́ндр Алекса́ндрович Прохоре́нко
- Born: 22 June 1990; Gorodki, Tyulgansky District, Orenburg Oblast, RSFSR, USSR
- Died: 17 March 2016 (aged 25); Palmyra, Homs, Syria
- Burial place: Russia
- Spouse: Ekaterina Prokhorenko (2014–2016)
- Children: 1
- Military career
- Allegiance: Russian Federation
- Service years: 2007–2016
- Rank: Senior lieutenant
- Unit: Special Operations Forces
- Conflicts: Syrian Civil War; Palmyra offensive †
- Awards: Hero of the Russian Federation

Alexander Alexandrovich Prokhorenko (Russian: Алекса́ндр Алекса́ндрович Прохоре́нко; 22 June 1990 – 17 March 2016) was a Senior lieutenant with the Special Operations Forces of the Russian Armed Forces. He was killed during the March 2016 Palmyra offensive of the Syrian Civil War.

During his last moments, he was allegedly surrounded on all sides by ISIS fighters and he decided to order an airstrike at his own position, killing himself and all of the approaching fighters.

On 11 April 2016, President Vladimir Putin declared Prokhorenko a Hero of the Russian Federation, the highest Russian honor. His funeral with full military honors was held in his home village of Gorodki on 6 May 2016.

== Early and personal life ==
Prokhorenko was from the village of Gorodki in Orenburg Oblast. Prokhorenko was married and expecting his first child when he was killed in action.

== Military career ==
In 2007, he graduated from the Gorodets secondary school with a silver medal and entered the Orenburg Higher Anti-Aircraft Missile School. In 2008, due to the closure of the school, he was transferred to the Military Academy of Military Air Defense of the Armed Forces of the Russian Federation, from which he graduated with honors.

After graduating from the academy, he was assigned to the position of an advanced aviation gunner in the group of the Special Operations Forces of the Russian Federation. Since January 2016, he took part in the Russian military operation in Syria as a forward observer tasked to carry out the targeting of airstrikes at ISIS militant positions.

== Death ==
Prokhorenko was deployed in Syria when he was killed during the Liberation of Palmyra. It took weeks to retrieve and identify his body. He was nicknamed the Russian Rambo by Russian state media and buried with military honors. He was posthumously awarded the title Hero of the Russian Federation for reportedly calling in an airstrike on his own position, after being surrounded by ISIS militants. A text meme purporting to be a transcript of his last words circulated on social media, which was rated "unproven" by Snopes.

== Commemoration ==
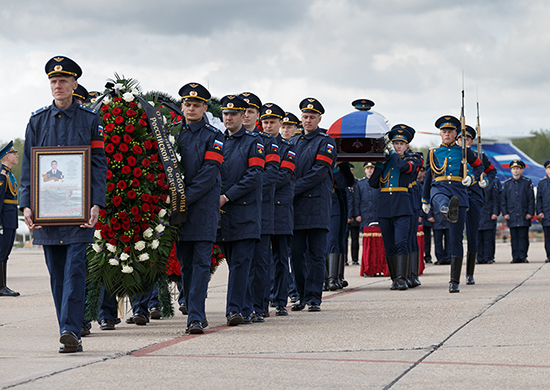
Farewell to Alexander Prokhorenko on Chkalovsky airfield

Prokhorenko's body was recovered and repatriated "with the participation of representatives of the Syrian authorities and the Kurdish militia". According to the Russian Defence Ministry, his body arrived in Moscow on 29 April and a spokesperson stated his repatriation "was a matter of honor for the Russian Defence Ministry".

The authorities of Orenburg decided to name one of the city's streets after Prokhorenko in his honor and a teacher at Prokhorenko's former school is reported as saying that she and others now wanted to rename the Gorodetskoy Middle School after him.

On 5 May 2016, a concert was performed by musicians from St. Petersburg's Mariinsky Theatre orchestra in the Roman Theatre at Palmyra in Syria conducted by Valery Gergiev. The concert was dedicated to the memory of Alexander Prokhorenko. The theatre is a UNESCO-listed site. In November 2015, ISIS had used the theatre site as a setting for the execution of Syrian soldiers.

Two retired French citizens, Micheline Mague and Daniel Couture, paid tribute to Prokhorenko by donating World War II era military medals to his family. Micheline Mague and her husband Jean-Claude traveled to Russia and presented the medals to his parents, Alexander and Natalia Prokhorenko, and his brother, Ivan, in a meeting at the Russian Defense Ministry. Mague gave a Legion of Honour (Ordre National de la Légion d'honneur) and a Cross of War (Croix de Guerre) with a bronze palm. The awards belonged to close family members who fought in World War II. Daniel Couture sent the Legion of Honour which belonged to his father, a member of the French Resistance. Couture stated in a letter that he felt that Prokhorenko died defending not only Russia and France, but all other countries who are menaced by terrorism. He also wished to honor the Russian people "who had brought their decisive contribution to the victory over Nazi Germany." The "Ordre National de la Legion d’Honneur" (Legion of Honour) is the highest French order for military and civil merits.

On October 5, 2016, during a ceremony at the Russian Cultural Centre of Rome, the ANDPI (Italian Association of Parachutists), Section of Rome inaugurated the 161st Parachuting Course, dedicated to the memory of Alexander Prokhorenko.

On September 9, 2017, during a ceremony at the park of Honor and Dishonor on the shores of Lake Vagli Sotto, the Puglia Administration, in partnership with the Russian government, inaugurated a commemorative marble statue depicting Aleksander Prochorenko, located in the part of the park dedicated to Honor.

The last stand of Prokhorenko is depicted in the 2017 video game Syrian Warfare.

== See also ==
- List of Heroes of the Russian Federation
- List of last stands
- Russian Armed Forces casualties in Syria
