= Syrian Marines =

Syrian Republican Guard naval infantry unit

- فوج مغاوير البحر; Faouj Maghawir al-Bahr
- Syrian Marines emblem
- Active: 2016–2017 (Ba'athist Era); 2025–present (current)
- Country: Ba'athist Syria (2016-2017); Syria (2025-Present)
- Allegiance: Syrian Arab Republic
- Type: Marine
- Size: Regiment
- Part of: Republican Guard (2016-2017); Syrian Navy (2025-Present)
- Garrison/HQ: Latakia Governorate
- Engagements: Syrian Civil War: Latakia offensive (2015–2016); Palmyra offensive (March 2016); Ithriyah-Raqqa offensive (June 2016); 2015–16 Latakia offensive; 2016 Latakia offensive; Aleppo offensive (November 2016); Palmyra offensive (2017); Eastern Homs offensive (2017); East Hama offensive (2017); March 2025 Western Syria clashes

Insignia
- Flag

The Syrian Marines (Arabic: فوج مغاوير البحر, romanized: Faouj Maghawir al-Bahr, lit. 'Sea Commandos Regiment') is a naval infantry unit part of the Syrian Navy and was formerly part Syrian Republican Guard based in the Latakia Governorate. It was a significant participant in Syrian government operations and offensives during the Syrian Civil War in 2016 and 2017.

== History ==
In February 2016, the Syrian Marines participated in a Latakia offensive alongside Syrian government forces.

In March 2016, a large number of Syrian Marine convoys were deployed to the Battle of Palmyra from northern Latakia.

On 25 November 2016, several units of the SSNP and Syrian marines arrived to Aleppo in participation of Operation Dawn of Victory. Most of them were redeployed from the Latakia governorate.

On 23 February 2017, al-Masdar News reported that over 900 Syrian Marines had joined the Military Security Shield Forces in order to avoid being drafted into the regular army.

== See also ==
- Desert Hawks Brigade
- 25th Special Mission Forces Division
