= Abu Jandal al-Kuwaiti =

High-ranking ISIL commander

- Born: Abdul Mohsen al-Zaghilani al-Taresh or Abdul Mohsen Al-Dhufairi; 1970s or 1980s Al Jahra, Kuwait
- Died: 26 December 2016; Near Jabar, Raqqa Governorate, Syria
- Spouse: Rahaf Zina
- Relatives: Hussein Al-Dhufairi (possibly brother)
- Military career
- Allegiance: Islamic State
- Branch: Military of ISIL; ISIL Media Council
- Service years: ?–2016
- Rank: "Number two military commander" for ISIL operations in Syria
- Nickname: "The Lion"
- Commands: Knights Battalion (Rapid Response Battalion); Army of Raqqa
- Conflicts: War on terror: Military intervention against ISIL: American-led intervention in Syria; Syrian Civil War: 2014 Eastern Syria offensive; Al-Shaitat tribal rebellion; Siege of Deir ez-Zor (2014–17); Deir ez-Zor offensive (September 2014); Palmyra offensive (December 2016); Raqqa campaign (2016–2017) †; Iraqi Civil War (2014–2017)

Abu Jandal al-Kuwaiti (1970s/80s – 26 December 2016; born Abdul Mohsen al-Zaghilani al-Taresh or Abdul Mohsen Al-Dhufairi) was a leading official of the Islamic State, serving as important military commander, recruiter and propagandist. Known for his command capabilities and popular among his subordinates, Abu Jandal was called "The Lion" among IS fighters and fought in several battles in Syria and Iraq. By late 2016, Abu Jandal had become IS' second highest-ranking commander in Syria and led the defense of its de facto capital Raqqa against the Syrian Democratic Forces (SDF). He was killed by a US airstrike on 26 December 2016.

== Biography ==
=== Early career under IS ===
Generally, relatively little is known about Abu Jandal. His birth name has been reported as either "Abdul Mohsen al-Zaghilani al-Taresh" or "Abdul Mohsen Al-Dhufairi". He was born in the city of al Jahra in Kuwait, likely during the 1970s or 1980s, and was at some point influenced and radicalised by Jihadist ideology. As result, he ventured to Syria, where he joined the Islamic State of Iraq and the Levant. Over time, he began to play an important role in recruiting new members for IS through social media, appearing in propaganda videos and carrying out executions. He was even appointed to a senior position on the IS Media Council. In this way, he won considerable fame and many fans and followers in his home city Al Jahra.

Sometime after joining IS, he married the Syrian Jihadist Rahaf Zina, though other reports stated that his wife was Iraqi. The couple eventually had a son, Jandal, whereupon he adopted his kunya Abu Jandal al-Kuwaiti ("Father of Jandal, the Kuwaiti") as nom de guerre. He also rose in ranks as military commander, while becoming popular among subordinate IS fighters due to his reported modesty. By July 2014, Abu Jandal served as a top commander of the Islamic State's 6,000-man-strong Army of Hasakah, personally leading the Knights Battalion. Over time, he became a "troubleshooter" for IS, and the battalion under his command subsequently became known the "Rapid Response Battalion". In August 2014, Abu Jandal helped to brutally suppress the Al-Shaitat tribal rebellion, and around September of that year, he fought in Deir ez-Zor.

=== IS high command ===
Between 2015 and 2016, Abu Jandal led various military operations in both Iraq as well as Syria, and joined IS' War Committee. In this capacity, he was involved in the planning and operation of suicide car bombs, IEDs, and chemical weapons against the SDF, and became closely associated with Abu Bakr al-Baghdadi as well as IS's terror attack planners.

By December 2016, Abu Jandal had risen to the second-most important IS commander in Syria, and participated in an offensive to retake Palmyra and its surroundings from the Syrian government. After this attack's success on 11 December, he was redeployed to Raqqa and appointed as chief commander for the defenses of the Islamic State's de facto capital in face of the SDF-led Raqqa campaign. His most important task was protecting IS's supply routes to the northern frontlines and al-Bab in the west. Abu Jandal consequently became crucially involved in the battle for the strategic significant village of Jabar. IS troops who were probably under his command achieved a minor success during this battle when they surrounded and destroyed a SDF detachment in the village on 21 December, forcing the international SDF volunteer Ryan Lock to kill himself in order to not be captured. Nevertheless, Jabar finally fell to the SDF on 26 December, whereupon Abu Jandal personally organized and led a large-scale counter-attack. In course of this assault, a US airstrike hit his convoy near the village, killing him and his bodyguards; the counter-attack subsequently failed. Abu Jandal was in his thirties when he died.

== Legacy ==
According to CJTF–OIR, Abu Jandal's death was a heavy blow to IS, degrading "ISIL's ability to defend Raqqa and launch external operations against the West." IS confirmed his death on 27 December and eulogized him in a video titled "Smashing the Enemies: Regarding the Results of the Army of the Islamic State Against the Apostate PKK on the Outskirts of the Wilayat [al-Raqqa]".

After his death, his widow Rahaf Zina reportedly married Hussein Al-Dhufairi, who is possibly Abu Jandal's brother and another IS leader. On March 25, 2017, Hussein Al-Dhufairi and Rahaf Zina were arrested by security forces in Manila, Philippines. Soon after, Kuwaiti security officials executed two raids in Kuwait, arresting three additional family members of Abu Jandal, and seven other suspects. Kuwaiti officials said they found bomb-making equipment during the raids.
