= Palmyra Airport =

Palmyra Airport مطار تدمر
- IATA: PMS; ICAO: OSPR

Summary
- Airport type: Public / military
- Owner: Syrian Armed Forces
- Operator: Syrian Air Force
- Serves: Palmyra, Syria
- Time zone: EET (UTC+02:00 / UTC+03:00)
- Elevation AMSL: 403 m / 1,322 ft
- Coordinates: 34°33′27″N 038°19′01″E

Map
- Location of airport in Syria

Runways
Direction	Length		Surface
Direction	m	ft	Surface
08/26	2,880	9,449	Asphalt
- Source: DAFIF

Palmyra Airport (Arabic: مطار تدمر), also formerly known as Tadmur Airport and Camp Mermoz, (IATA: PMS, ICAO: OSPR) is a military airport serving Palmyra, a small city in Syria.

== History ==
On 20 May 2015, ISIS captured the airbase. As of 27 March 2016, it was recaptured by the Syrian Army following the 2016 Palmyra offensive only to be recaptured by ISIL eight months later, following the Palmyra offensive (December 2016). In March 2017, it was recaptured by the Syrian Army following the Palmyra offensive (2017). In December 2024, the Revolutionary Commando Army recaptured the airport.

== Facilities ==
The airport resides at an elevation of 403 metres (1,322 ft) above mean sea level. It has one runway designated 08/26 with an asphalt surface measuring 2,880 by 45 metres (9,449 ft × 148 ft).

== Airlines and destinations ==
Due to the ongoing Syrian Civil War, there are currently no scheduled flights operated to or from the airport.
