= Palmyra offensive (March 2016) =

Military operation started by the Syrian Arab Army

- Part of the Syrian Civil War, Military intervention against ISIL, Russian military intervention in Syria, Iranian involvement in the Syrian Civil War, and Hezbollah involvement in the Syrian Civil War
- Map showing areas captured by 26 March
Date	9 – 27 March 2016 (2 weeks and 4 days)
Location	Tadmur District, Eastern Homs Governorate, Syria 34.5600°N 38.2672°E
Result	Syrian government victory: Syrian Army captures Palmyra city and its area

Belligerents
(Syria) Syrian Arab Republic; Russia; Iran; Allied militias: Hezbollah; Iraqi Shi'ite militias: Kata'ib al-Imam Ali; Kata'ib Hezbollah; Harakat Hezbollah al-Nujaba; Badr Organization; Liwa Fatemiyoun (Syria) Liwa Sayf al-Mahdi; Ba'ath Brigades; Galilee Forces	Islamic State

Commanders and leaders
Major General Suhayl al-Hasan (Operations chief commander); Ali Rahmoun † (Syrian Marines commander); Colonel Ali Shaheen (Panther Forces Brigade commander); Colonel Shadi Isma'el (Cheetah Forces commander); Suleiman al-Shwakh (Desert Commandos commander) "The Uncle" Abu Ismail (Military Security Shield Forces commander) (Russia) Col. Gen. Aleksandr Dvornikov (Russian forces commander); Lt. Gen. Aleksandr Zhuravlev (Russian operations commander); Sen. Lt. Alexander Prokhorenko † (Spetsnaz commander) (Russia) Yevgeny Prigozhin (Wagner Group Leader)	(Islamic State) Sultan bin 'Abdel-Rahman † (Emir of Palmyra) (Islamic State) Khalil Mohameed † (Emir of Palmyra)

Units involved
Syrian Armed Forces; Syrian Army; 18th Armoured Division; 67th Brigade; 134th Armoured Brigade; Tiger Forces; Panther Forces Brigade; Cheetah Forces; Republican Guard; Syrian Marines; Qalamoun Shield Forces; Desert Hawks Brigade; Military Intelligence Directorate; Desert Commandos Regiment; Military Security Shield Forces; Forces of the Fighters of the Tribes; National Defence Forces; Golan Regiment; Al-Quneitra Hawks Brigade; (Russia) Russian forces: Russian Air Force; Russian naval infantry advisors; Special operations forces advisors; Wagner Group (PMC); (Iran) IRGC advisors Hezbollah: National Ideological Resistance	(Islamic State) Military of ISIL

Strength
6,000+	(Islamic State) 2,000+ (per Syrian Army)

Casualties and losses
(Syria) 391 killed (Russia) 12 killed (Iran) 3 killed	(Islamic State) 417 killed (per SOHR); 450 killed (per Syrian Army); 500+ killed (per Russia; 20–27 March)

The Palmyra offensive (March 2016) was a military operation of the Syrian Arab Army, supported by Russian airstrikes, to recapture from the Islamic State the city of Tadmur (near the ruins of the ancient city of Palmyra), which was strategically important for both forces due to its position in central Syria. The city was fully recaptured on 27 March.

== Offensive ==
=== Battle for the hills ===
==== First week ====
On 9 March 2016, heavy Russian airstrikes started hitting the Palmyra area, with 32 ISIL fighters reported killed by the next day. As of 14 March, 80 airstrikes and 200 rockets and artillery shells had hit the city. The Syrian Arab Army's Central Command stated their next aim after eventually capturing Palmyra would be Deir ez-Zor.

Major ground fighting started on 12 March, when the Syrian Army attacked the village of Al-Dawah, west of Palmyra, while the next day they assaulted Jabal Qassoun mountain, where Palmyra Castle is located. In all, the military's attack was directed against three flanks of Palmyra in an attempt to surround the city. In preparation for the offensive, ISIL built strong defenses in the city and trenches around it.

On 14 March, the military captured Hill 800 and Hill 853, which are part of Jabal Hayyan mountain, southwest of Palmyra, while the ISIL emir of the city, Khalil Mohameed, was reportedly killed when a rocket hit his headquarters.

On 15 March, government forces fully secured Jabal Hayyan mountain, after capturing Hill 900. The advance brought the military to within four kilometers west and south of Palmyra. Elsewhere, fighting continued in Al-Dawah, while Army units were also attempting to advance towards the Brigade 550 Base. Meanwhile, Russian airstrikes on the road between Palmyra and Al-Sukhnah left 26 people dead.

==== Second week ====
On 17 March, ISIL took advantage of a sandstorm and launched a counter-attack against Point 939 and the Jabal Hayyan mountain, though the Army repelled the assault. Later that day, Syrian Marines from the Latakia Governorate and Hezbollah fighters were sent as reinforcements to Palmyra to strengthen the government forces for the assault on the city. ISIL also sent reinforcements. The same day, a Russian Special Operations Forces operative, Sen. Lt. Alexander Prokhorenko, responsible for performing target acquisition for designated Russian airstrikes was killed when he ordered an airstrike on himself after being surrounded by ISIL fighters. Prokhorenko's death garnered international media attention and was hailed as a hero.

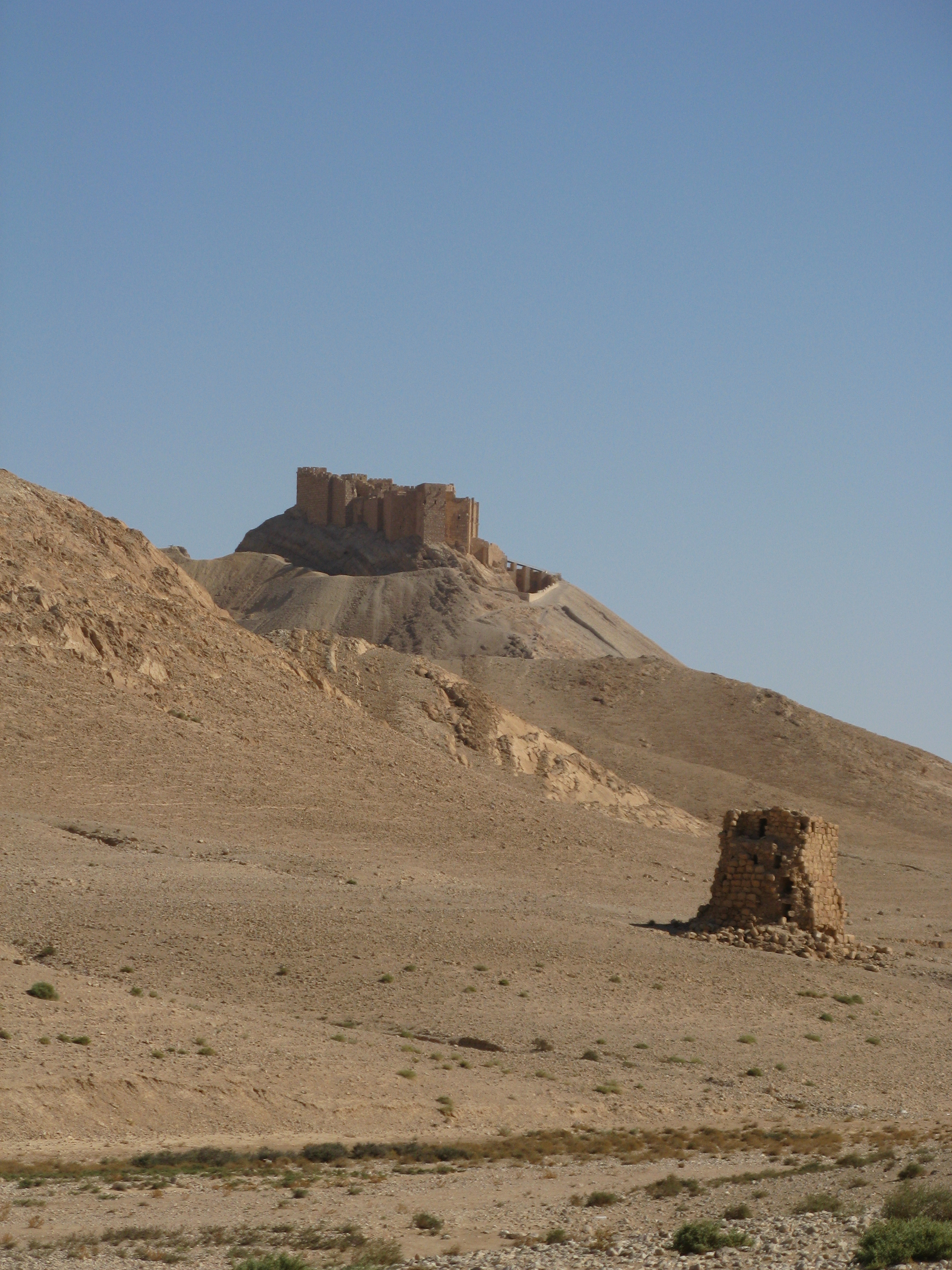
Palmyra Castle.

The following day, the SAA seized the Tal Mattar hilltop, close to the Palmyra Castle, after which they continued to advance, capturing Tal Areen hill. Concurrently with the Syrian Army ground offensive, Russia was conducting 20–25 airstrikes daily on ISIL positions in and around Palmyra. ISIL claimed to have killed six Syrian soldiers, five Russian soldiers and several Hezbollah fighters in the defense of Qasr al-Halabat west of Palmyra. An ISIL website released a video showing the body of a man in military gear, described as a Russian military advisor, with equipment including a customised AK-74M rifle, a helmet, a compass and a pack of bandages with instructions written in Russian. The body, however, was possibly one of the few ethnic-Russian PMCs from the "Wagner Group" killed or reported missing around the Palmyra suburbs. On 17 March, PMC Vadim Tumakov was confirmed killed by fighting in Palmyra.

On 20 March, the SAA captured two hills overlooking the Ithriyah–Palmyra highway, cutting off of one of ISIL's main supply routes to the city. The next day, the SAA made more advances, as they assaulted the Jabal Al-Tar hilltop. 26 Syrian Marines, including their commander Ali Rahmoun, were killed during the day's clashes. 17 of the Marines died as a result of a friendly fire accident when they were hit with a Russian missile. Another 26 were wounded. Meanwhile, IRGC advisors and Liwa Fatemiyoun units arrived as another wave of pro-government reinforcements.

On 21 March, a large convoy of reinforcements from the NDF units of Fouj Al-Joulan and Liwaa Suqour Al-Quneitra arrived at the western countryside of Palmyra, raising the number of pro-government forces in the area to more than 6,000. The next evening, government advances continued with the support of 50 airstrikes and the Army seized the Palmyra Triangle road junction. Subsequently, around 120 explosives were cleared from the Triangle area.

As of 23 March, the military was within one or two kilometers of the city on the south side and five kilometers on the west side, as they reached the outskirts of Palmyra, after seizing the al-Hayal mountain range, including its hills that overlook the town. A soldier stated on state TV that they expected to capture the city within hours.

=== Close-quarters fighting ===
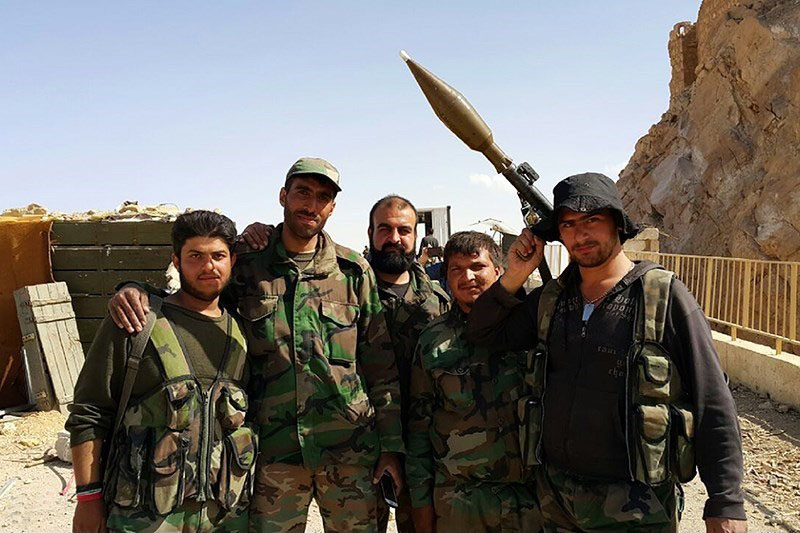
Syrian Army soldiers after the battle.

The following day, the Army was one kilometer from the town and facing stiff resistance as it tried to penetrate the city limits. They attacked the strategic Semiramis Hotel, on the outskirts of Palmyra, approaching to within 70 meters of the hotel. Fighting also reached the edge of the southwestern al-Gharf neighbourhood. As the clashes raged, ISIL urged civilians through loudspeakers to leave the city. In the afternoon, government forces managed to fully capture the Semiramis Hotel, as well as Muhtar Mount, Al-Zera'a roundabout, Al-Tar Mountain, the Tombs Valley and the Mozeh Palace, a luxury villa which ISIL used as a headquarters and previously belonged to the House of Thani (the Qatari Royal family). In the evening, the Army entered the first houses in the southwestern part of Palmyra.

On the morning of 25 March, pro-government forces took control of several hilltops on the western and northwestern side of Palmyra, including near Palmyra Castle. Later that day, the castle itself was captured, as well as reportedly the Brigade 550 Base. Government forces were also reported to have reached the Palmyra Prison, after seizing most of the Palmyra Orchards and the city's airbase. Fighting also raged at the archaeological sites where government force's progress was slow due to the lack of artillery support for the sake of protecting the ruins. At this point, ISIL forces started withdrawing their equipment from Palmyra and planting land mines.

On 26 March, state TV reported the military captured three neighborhoods inside Palmyra, including the northern district of Al-Amiriya, as well as the neighborhoods of Mutaqa'ideen and Al-Jami'a. The opposition activist group the SOHR confirmed the capture of Al-Amiriya, but stated the other two neighborhoods were still being contested, with ISIL conducting counter-attacks with car-bombs against advancing government forces. Most apartment blocks in the city's residential area were damaged by the fighting and several had completely collapsed. Later, SOHR confirmed the capture of Mutaqa'ideen and Al-Jami'a and reported government troops secured 35% of the city, while ISIL fighters were retreating towards the Al-Sukhnah area, east of Palmyra.

On the dawn of 27 March, the city was fully captured by the SAA after ISIL defenses collapsed. Sporadic fighting continued in the eastern outskirts of Palmyra between government forces and ISIL fighters who refused to retreat, concentrated at the prison and the airbase. However, most of ISIL's forces had withdrawn to the east. Later in the day, the prison and the airbase were captured as the remaining 30 ISIL militants fought to the death.

== Aftermath ==
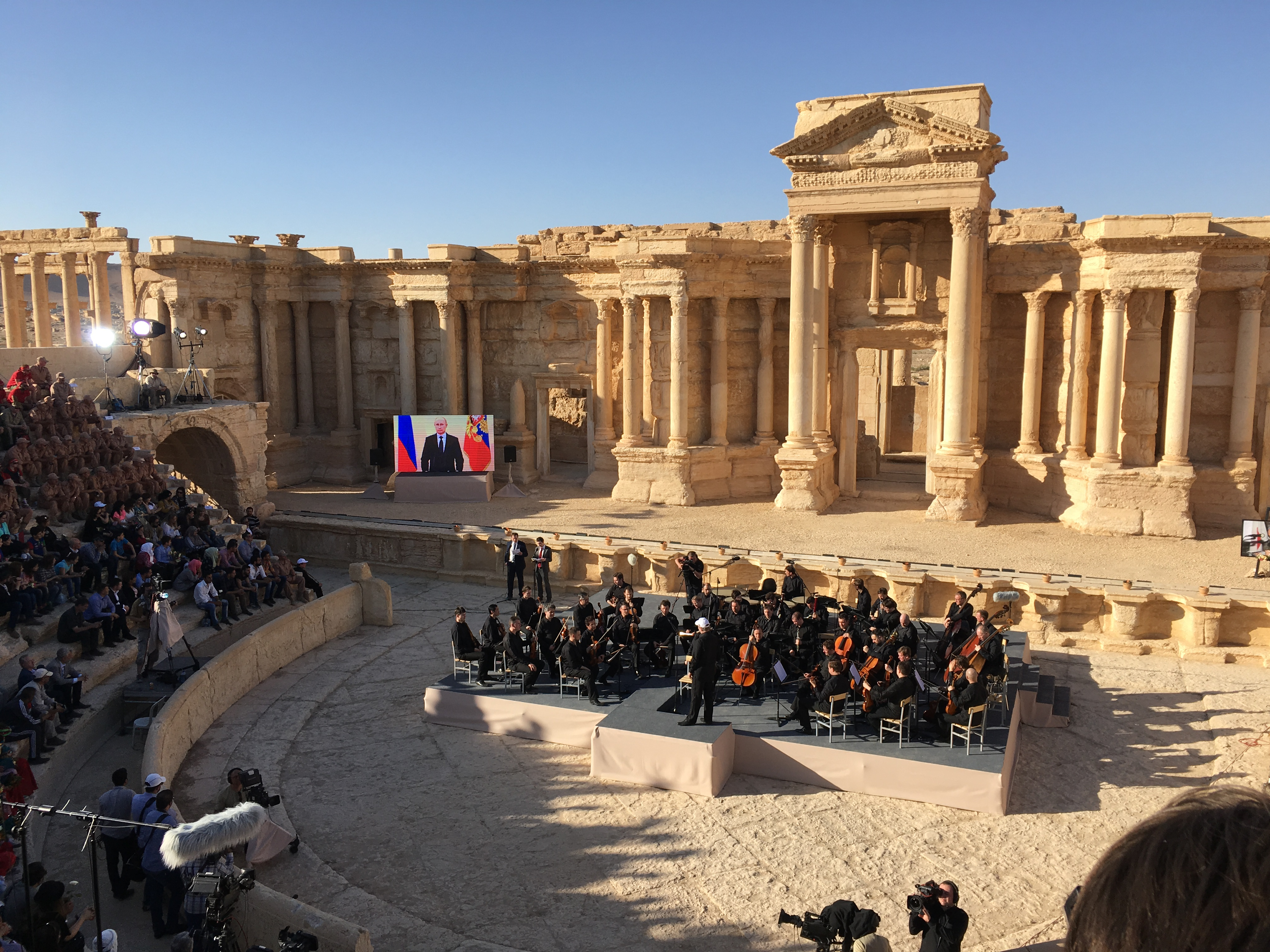
The concert at the Roman amphitheatre after the reconquest of Palmyra.

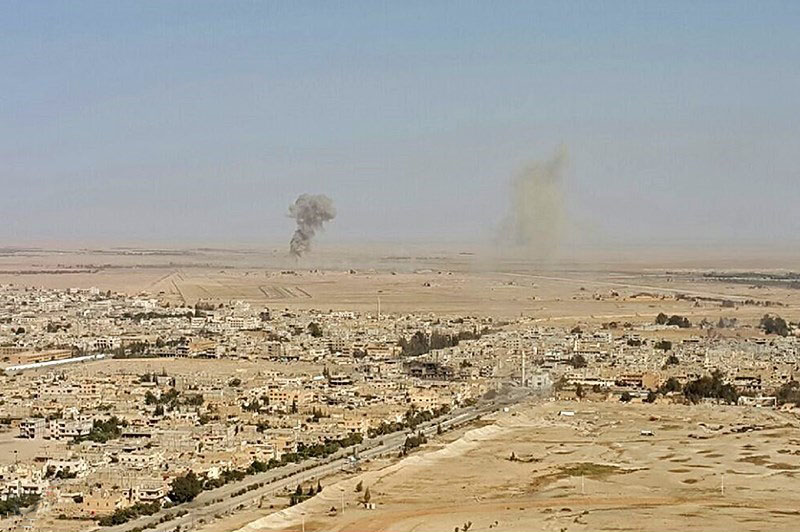
Palmyra on 28 March 2016, a day after being liberated.

After the liberation of the city, a Russian military convoy, including armored personnel carriers, arrived to help in the process of clearing Palmyra of explosives left by retreating ISIL forces. Meanwhile, a mass grave containing the bodies of 24 civilians and 18 soldiers was discovered. In all, at least 280 people are believed to have been executed by ISIL during its control of the town. Overall, between 29 March and 30 April, Russian and Syrian explosive-disposal teams removed 4,000 explosive devices in the ruins and another 1,000 in the town.

On 5 May, the Mariinsky Theatre Orchestra and Sergei Roldugin performed at the Roman amphitheatre of Palmyra in a highly publicized event.

In another offensive military operation in December 2016, ISIL reconquered Palmyra and its surroundings, with the Syrian government and its allies retaking it again in 2017.

== Reactions ==
- Egypt: The spokesman for the Ministry of Foreign Affairs of Egypt stated they "welcomed the liberation of the historic Syrian city of Palmyra" and said that Egypt "has realized the imminent danger that threatens the cultural heritage of the region in the light of attacks" by ISIL.
- Iran: The secretary of Iran's Supreme National Security Council, Ali Shamkhani, congratulated Syria for the victory, adding that "the Iranian government and Armed Forces will continue their full support for Syria and the axis of resistance".
- Russia: President of Russia Vladimir Putin congratulated Syrian President Bashar al-Assad on regaining Palmyra and reassured him that Russia would continue to support the Syrian government in fighting terrorists.
- Syria: Syrian President Bashar al-Assad told a French delegation in Damascus, "The liberation of the historic city of Tadmur (Palmyra) today is an important achievement and is evidence of the efficacy of the strategy adopted by the Syrian Army and its allies in the war on terrorism".
- United Nations: Ban Ki-moon hailed the liberation of Palmyra.
  - UNESCO welcomed the liberation of Palmyra from ISIL, who it said had been carrying out a campaign of "cultural cleansing" around the ancient city. According to UNESCO director-general Irina Bokova, as soon as security conditions allow, UNESCO was ready to launch a mission in Palmyra together with the Syrian authorities to evaluate damage and protect the "priceless heritage" of the city.
- United States: Mark Toner of the US State Department in his briefing, when answering questions about the fate of Palmyra on 24 March, a day before the major Syrian offensive, said: "I mean, broadly speaking, it's not a great choice, an either/or—but, which is worse, Daesh or the regime... we think Daesh is probably the greater evil in this case."

== Gallery ==
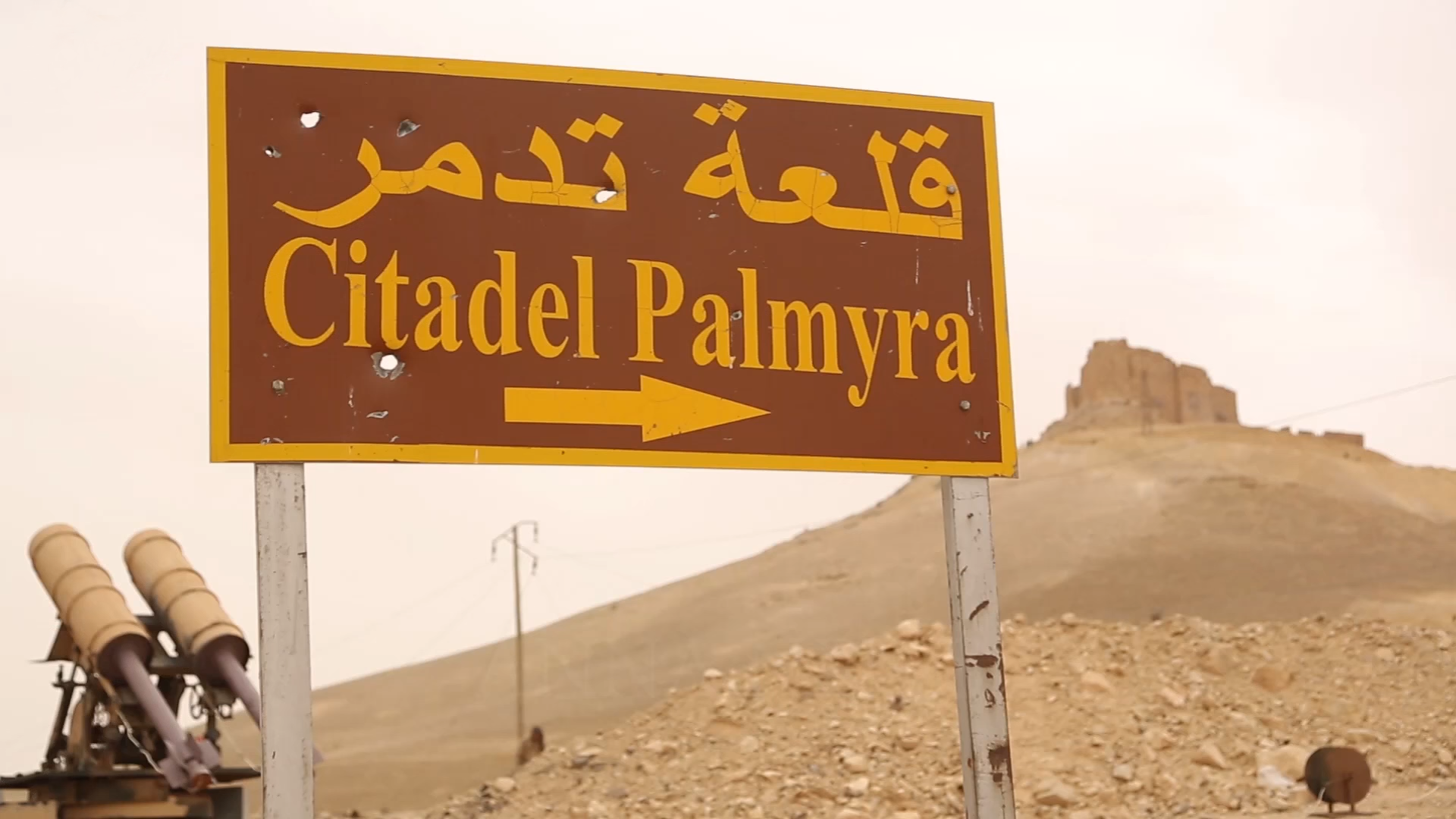
The Palmyra Castle (background) during the battle

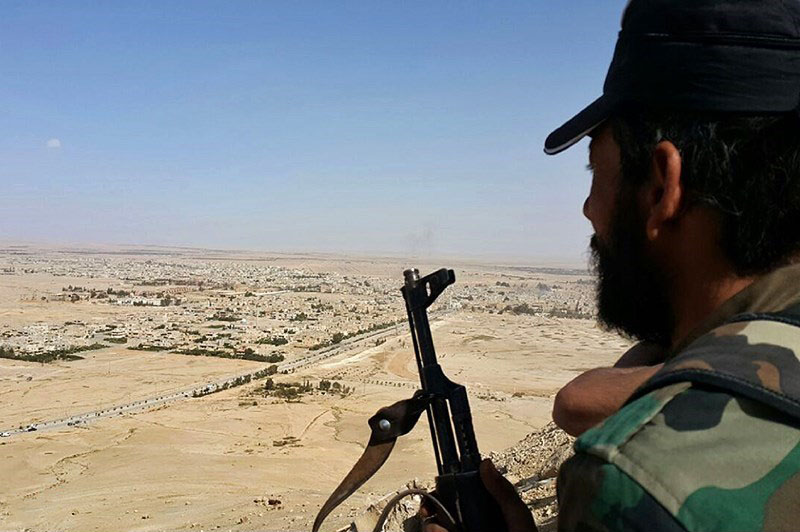
A pro-government soldier overlooks Palmyra after the battle

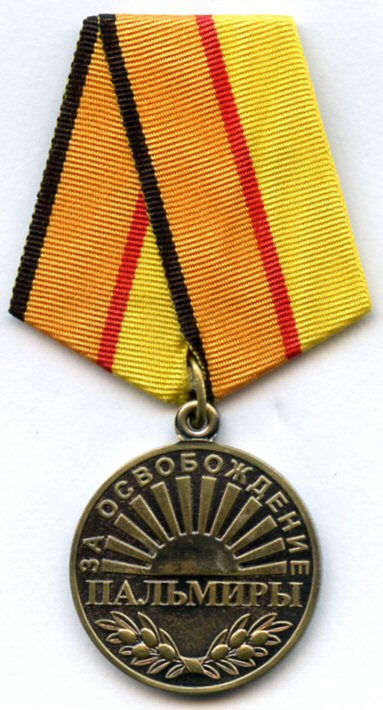
A Russian campaign medal "For the Liberation of Palmyra"
