= Palmyra offensive (2017) =

2017 military operation of the Syrian Civil War

Coordinates: 34.5600°N 38.2672°E

- Part of the Syrian Civil War, Military intervention against ISIL, Russian military intervention in Syria, Iranian involvement in the Syrian Civil War, and Hezbollah involvement in the Syrian Civil War
- Situation in southern Syria from 6 February to 30 April; Government advances are shown at the top of the map.
Date	13 January – 2 March 2017 (1 month, 2 weeks and 3 days)
Location	Tadmur District, Eastern Homs Governorate, Syria
Result	Syrian government victory: Syrian Army captures 1,702 square kilometres and 52 settlements, including Palmyra; The Syrian Army launches a new offensive on 5 March 2017 to expand a buffer-zone around Palmyra

Belligerents
Syria; Russia; Allied militias: Hezbollah; Liwa Zainebiyoun CJTF–OIR	Islamic State

Commanders and leaders
Maj. Gen. Suheil al-Hassan (Operations chief commander); Maj. Gen. Mohammed Hassan Sultan (5th Corps commander) (Russia) Col. Gen. Andrey Kartapolov (Russian forces commander) (Russia) Maj. Gen. Pyotr Milyukhin (WIA)	Abu Shaher al-Hassan † (ISIL emir)

Units involved
Syrian Armed Forces; Syrian Army; 10th Mechanised Division; 11th Armored Division; 18th Armoured Division; 5th Assault Corps; Al-Assad Shield Forces; ISIS Hunters; Republican Guard; 800th Regiment; Syrian Marines; Tiger Forces; Shahin Group (Fawj al-Shawaheen) (until 11 February); Qalamoun Shield Forces; National Defence Forces; Golan Regiment; Al-Shaitat tribe militias; Military Intelligence Directorate; Military Security Shield Forces; Desert Commandos Regiment; Air Force Intelligence Directorate; Fawj Nusur Homs; Syrian Air Force; Russian Armed Forces and PMC allies; Russian Air Force; Special operations forces advisors; Wagner Group; Hezbollah military; Radwan Forces; Syrian Hezbollah units; al-Ridha Forces; Al-Ghalibun; Imam Mahdi Brigade	Military of ISIL

Strength
4,900+ soldiers: 1,000 reinforcements from Latakia (since 11 February); 900+ Military Shield reinforcements (since 23 February)	Unknown (Some armoured vehicles)

Casualties and losses
(Syria) 115 killed (Russia) 18 killed (10 soldiers and 8 PMC)	283+ killed (per SOHR); 1,000+ killed and wounded (per Russian MOD)

The Palmyra offensive in 2017 was launched by the Syrian Arab Army against the armed forces of the Islamic State (IS) in the Eastern Homs Governorate in January 2017, with the goal of recapturing Palmyra and its surrounding countryside. ISIL forces had retaken the city of Palmyra in a sudden offensive from 8 to 11 December, after previously being expelled from it by Syrian government and Russian forces in March 2016. On 2 March 2017, the Syrian Army alongside Russian reinforcement, succeeded again in recapturing the beleaguered city of Palmyra.

== Background ==
In mid-December, ISIL launched an assault on Palmyra, eventually taking full control of the city as the Syrian Army withdrew. ISIL started advancing westwards from Palmyra to the Tiyas Military Airbase (also called al-Taifor and T4 airbase) after the city's capture, and nearly besieged it.

Clashes continued around the airbase until the end of December, when ISIL's assault was repelled. In early January 2017, it was reported that ISIL was withdrawing from the areas around the airbase.

== Offensive ==
Sometime between 12 and 13 January, the Syrian Army launched a counter-offensive. At the start of the operation, Abu Hafs al-Mashrifi, ISIL's chief of security in Homs province, was killed in an artillery strike on his headquarters in the Huwaysis area. On 14 January, the Army captured several points around al-Tayyas village, as well as areas near the abandoned base, advancing to the Jazal Mountains. The military soon after launched an attack on the mountains. It advanced further on 15 January, capturing the hills around the airbase. ISIL managed to repel an attempt by the Army to advance around the airbase on 16 January. Reinforcements and supplies for the Syrian Army arrived, for continuing the offensive. On 19 January, the SAA stormed the southern countryside of the T-4 airbase and captured a large amount of territory near al-Qaryatayn, while also clearing several sites to the east of the pumping station and Tayfor village. On 21 January, the Army recaptured the Jeb al-Murr area, in addition to advancing around the hills of al-Tiyas.

On 25 January, the Syrian Army captured the al-Fawa'ra area, including a military base. On 2 February, the Army captured al-Hattaniyyah and al-Marhatan areas as well as the Jihar crossroads. On 4 February, the Army recaptured the Hayyan gas fields. On 5 February, the Army captured the Majbel Asphalt area, Al-Baydah al Sharqiyah and al-Baydah al-Gharbiyah. On 7 February, ISIL recaptured the Hayyan gas fields. On 10 February, the Army recaptured the Hayyan Hills. On 11 February, ISIL recaptured the Majbel Asphalt area along with several surrounding points near the Hajjar crossroads. including the Hayyan Hills. On 13 February, the Army resumed its offensive, attacking ISIL and attempted to recapture all of the Hayyan Hills. On the next day, the Army broke through ISIL's defenses and recaptured the Hayyan gas fields.

On 16 February, the Syrian Army entered the Jihar Gas Fields and clashed with ISIL fighters. ISIL recaptured several wells in the Hayyan gas fields. On the same day, Russian forces suffered their first casualties, when a vehicular column from the Tiyas airbase to Homs was blown up by a remote-controlled IED, killing four Russian soldiers and wounding two others, including Major General Pyotr Milyukhin who lost both legs and an eye. By this point, the Army was within 24 kilometres (15 mi) of Palmyra. On 17 February, the Army captured the Eastern Bayarat area. They also captured Al-Kalaabiyah Farms during the day, reasserting complete control over Western Bayarat. An ISIL counterattack on Hayyan gas fields was repelled. On 18 February, the Army captured the Tarfah Al-Gharbiyah area and imposed full control over the Hayyan gas fields while pushing to the outskirts of Jazal Mountains. On the next day, they attacked the Jazal and al-Mahr oil fields and captured several of ISIL's final positions in eastern part of Al-Bayarat. On 20 February, it was reported to have captured Tarfah al-Sharqiyah.

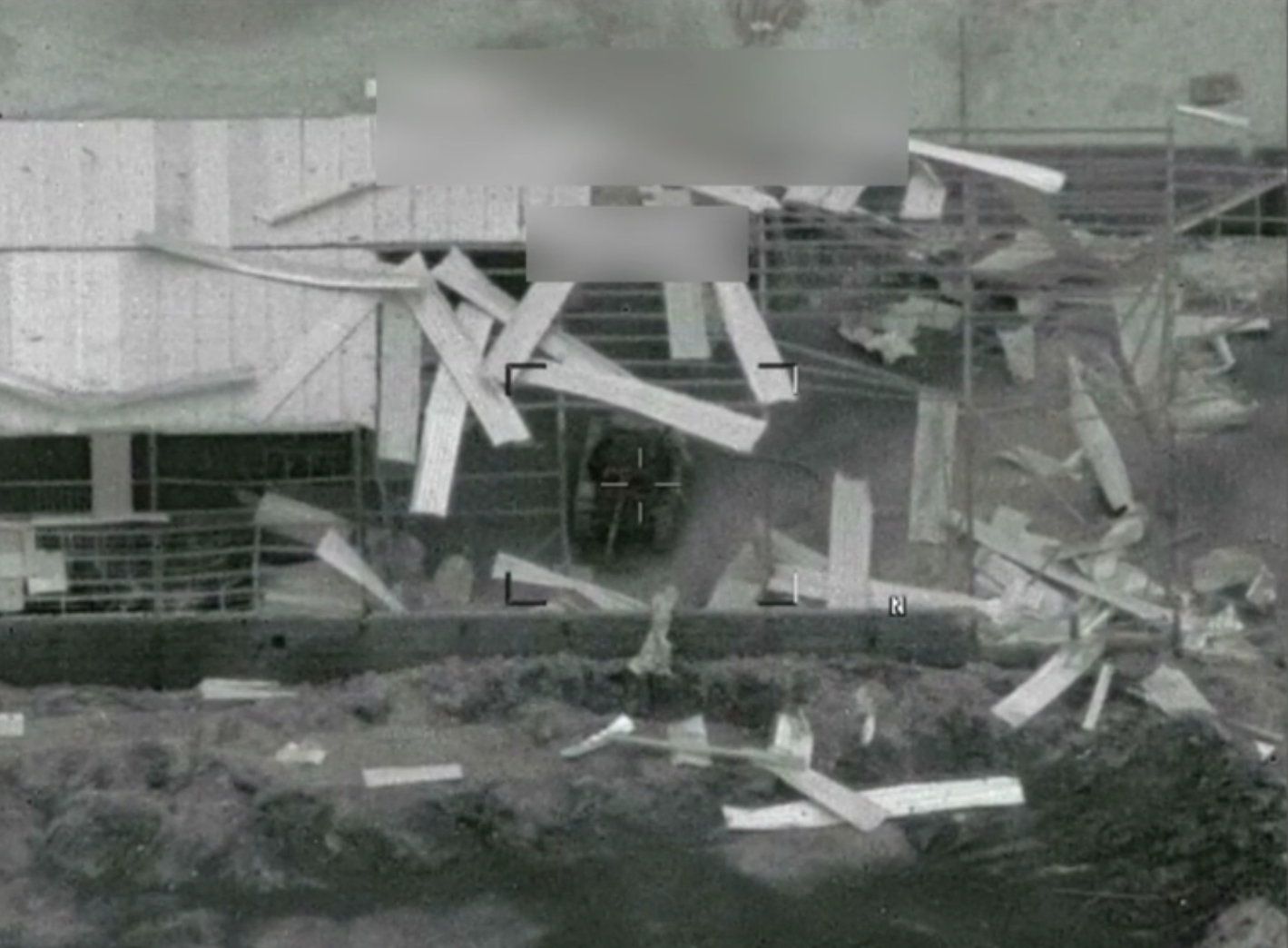
An ISIL tank near Palmyra shortly before its destruction by an CJTF–OIR airstrike on 27 February 2017.

The SAA resumed the offensive on 23 February, after pausing it to reinforce its positions at the Hayyan Gas Fields. The Syrian Army advanced towards the Driving School area of Palmyra during the day. On 24 February, the Syrian Army captured the Palmyra communications tower in the Eastern Bayarat area, after a short battle with the retreating Islamic State forces, and reached Jabal Hayyal mountain, overlooking Palmyra. On 26 February, it captured the hill of Tal SyriaTel, imposing fire control over Al-Mahr gas fields. It later captured the highest point of Jabbal Hayyal, giving it fire control over the Palmyra Triangle area as well as southwestern part of the city itself. It also captured the Quarries area to the northwest of the city. It also advanced and captured the quarries and all points overlooking al-Mahr oil fields. On the next day, it captured an adjacent point from Hayyal Mount. It also captured al-Tamtheel village directly to west of Palmyra, reaching the strategic al-Tar mountain. Its advances also brought it within 3 kilometres (1.9 mi) of Palmyra.

The Syrian Army captured the Palmyra Triangle area, Palmyra Castle, Qatari Castle, and al-Amriyah village, as well as many hilltops including Jabbal Hayyal and Jabbal al-Tar after an assault on 1 March. On the same day, the Syrian army and allies backed by warplanes, had entered to the modern city of Palmyra and captured the al-Motaqadin street after captured the western and northern western sections of the city amid information about pulling back by ISIL from the city. On the next day, ISIL launched a failed counter-attack following which SAA attacked and imposed full control over Jabal al-Tar and Palmyra Castle. ISIL later withdrew from most of Palmyra, after they mined many points in the city. However, they left behind suicide bombers in the eastern districts of Palmyra, to cover the retreat of the ISIL militants, and to hamper the progress of the Syrian Army. On 2 March, the Syrian Army recaptured the entire city of Palmyra, after ISIL fully withdrew from the city. On the next day, the Syrian Army captured the Palmyra Airport, and completely secured it on 4 March, after ISIL was forced to retreat to the Palmyra Grain Silos to the east of the airport.

== Losses ==
283 ISIL militants, 115 Syrian Army soldiers and five Russian servicemen were reported killed during the offensive by the SOHR, while the Russian military claimed more than 1,000 ISIL militants had been killed or wounded overall and that hundreds of ISIL vehicles were destroyed, including 19 tanks, 37 armored infantry fighting vehicles, 98 technicals and more than 100 other vehicles.

== Aftermath ==
The Syrian Army continued to advance in the regions around Palmyra, after the recapture of the city. By late May 2017, all roads linking Damascus with Palmyra came under the control of the Syrian government.

== See also ==
- Battle of al-Bab
- East Aleppo offensive (2017)
- Siege of Deir ez-Zor (2014–17)
