= Palmyra Castle =

Castle in Syria

- قلعة فخر الدين المعني
- Palmyra, Syria
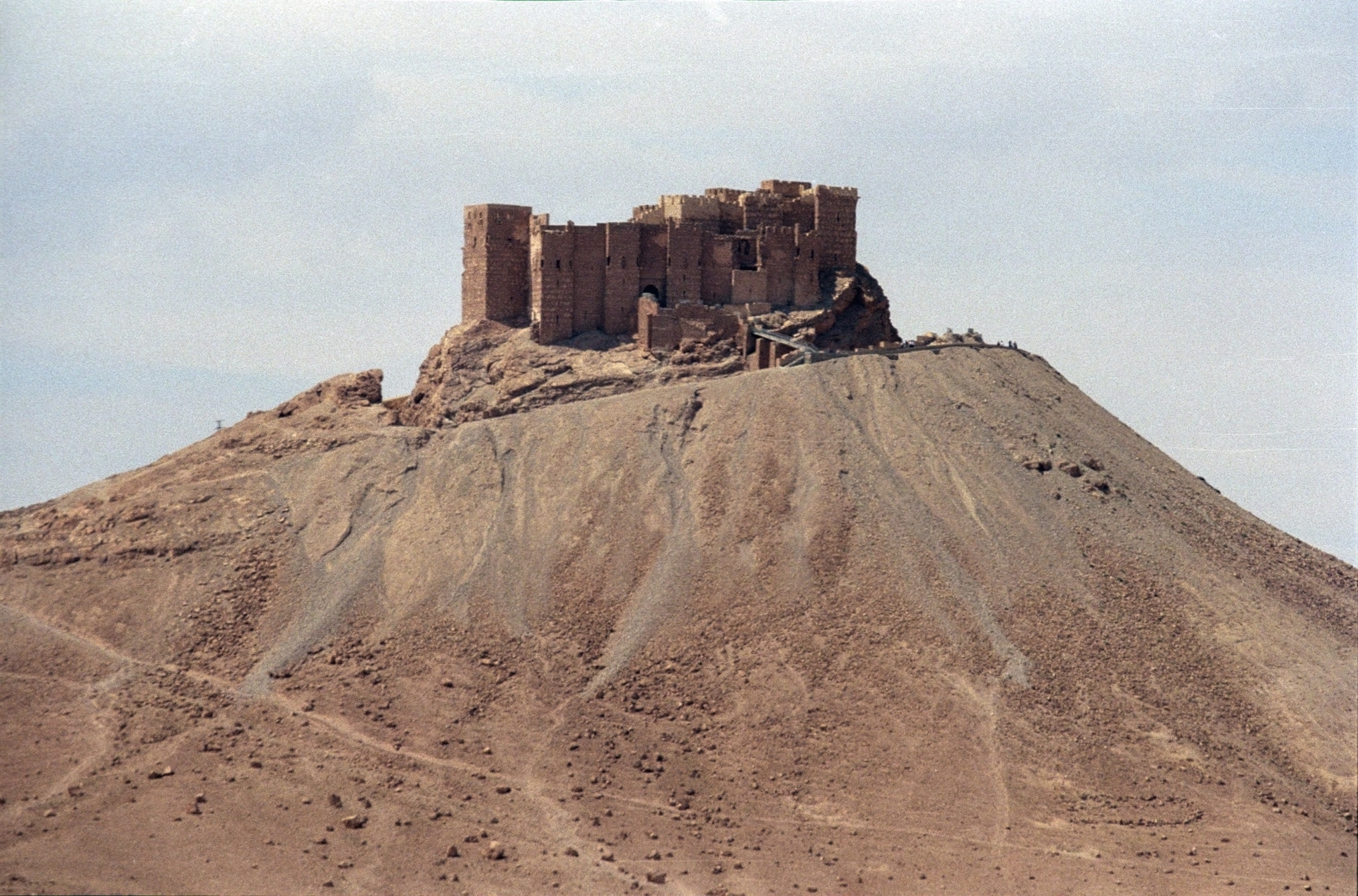
- View of the castle

Site information
- Type: Castle
- Controlled by: Syrian Army
- Open to the public: Inaccessible
- Condition: Largely intact but damaged

Location
- Location within Syria
- Coordinates: 34°33′46″N 38°15′26″E

Site history
- Built: 13th century
- Built by: Mamluks
- Battles/wars: Syrian Civil War: Palmyra offensive (May 2015); Palmyra offensive (March 2016); Palmyra offensive (December 2016); Palmyra offensive (January–March 2017)

UNESCO World Heritage Site
- Type: Cultural
- Criteria: i, ii, iv
- Designated: 1980 (4th session)
- Part of: Site of Palmyra
- Reference no.: 23
- Region: Arab States
- Endangered: 2013–present

Palmyra Castle, also known as Fakhr-al-Din al-Ma'ani Castle (Arabic: قلعة فخر الدين المعني) or Tadmur Castle, is a castle overlooking Palmyra in the province of Homs, Syria.

The castle is thought to have been built by the Mamluks in the 13th century on a high hill overlooking the historic site of Palmyra, and is named for the Druze emir Fakhr-al-Din II, who extended the Druze domains to the region of Palmyra during the 17th century.

The site of the castle and Palmyra in 1980 became a UNESCO World Heritage Site in recognition of the monumental ruins of a great city, which was one of the most important cultural centres of the ancient world. The site was designated a national monument in Syria and a buffer zone was established in 2007.

The castle lying on raised bedrock was a well defended position for a fortification with thick and high walls, which was also surrounded by a moat that had only one access available through a drawbridge.

The historic site was placed on the list of World Heritage Sites in Danger in 2013 due to the ongoing Syrian Civil War.

The castle was captured by the Islamic State of Iraq and the Levant during the Palmyra offensive in May 2015. It was recaptured by Syrian government forces in another offensive in March 2016. Retreating ISIS fighters blew up parts of the castle, including the stairway leading to the entrance, causing extensive damage. The basic structure is still intact, and Syrian director of antiquities Maamoun Abdelkarim stated that the damage is repairable and the castle is to be restored. The castle was captured by ISIL once again in December 2016. However, the Syrian Army captured it again after an assault on 1 March 2017.

== Gallery ==
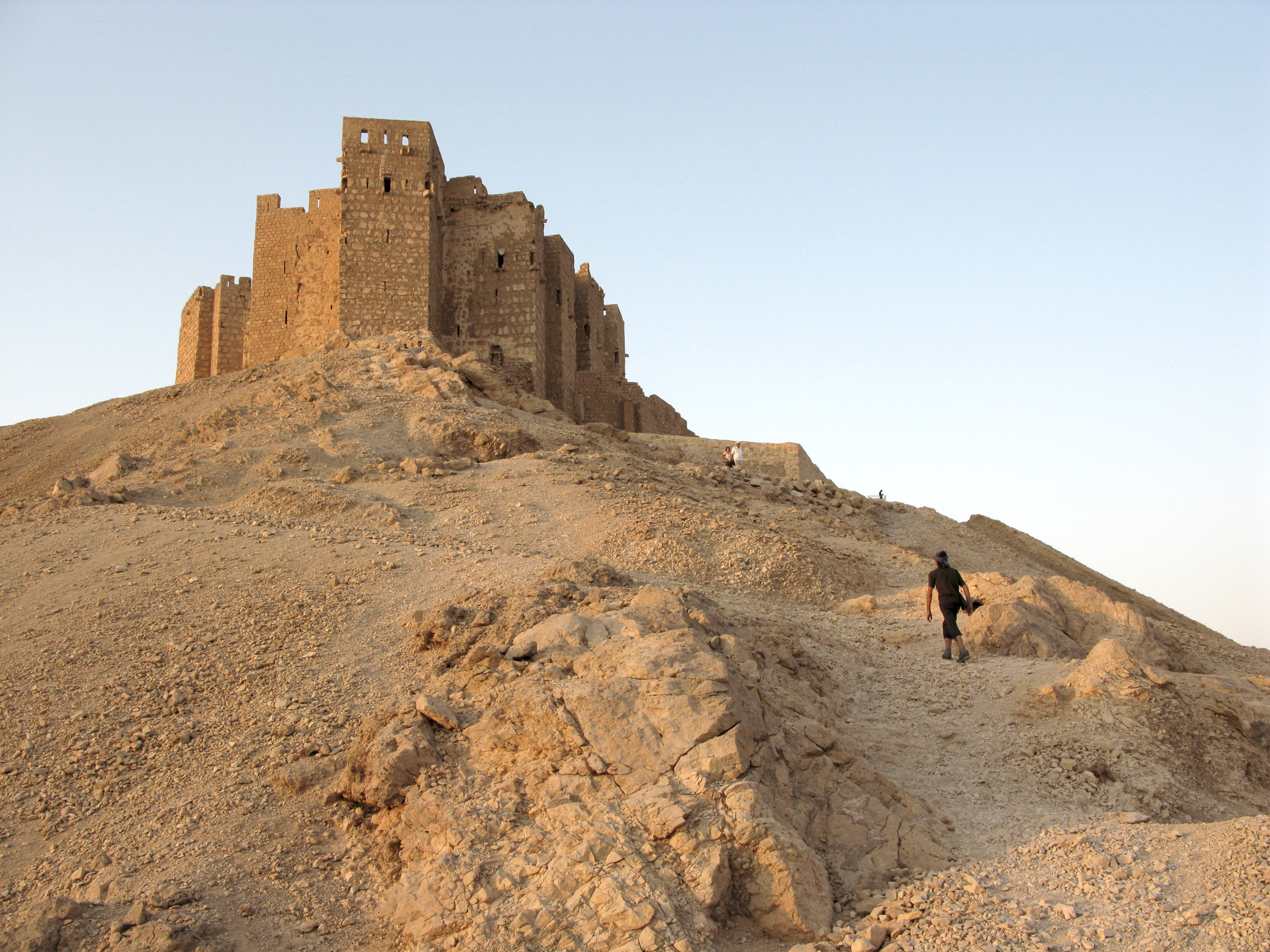
Way to the top

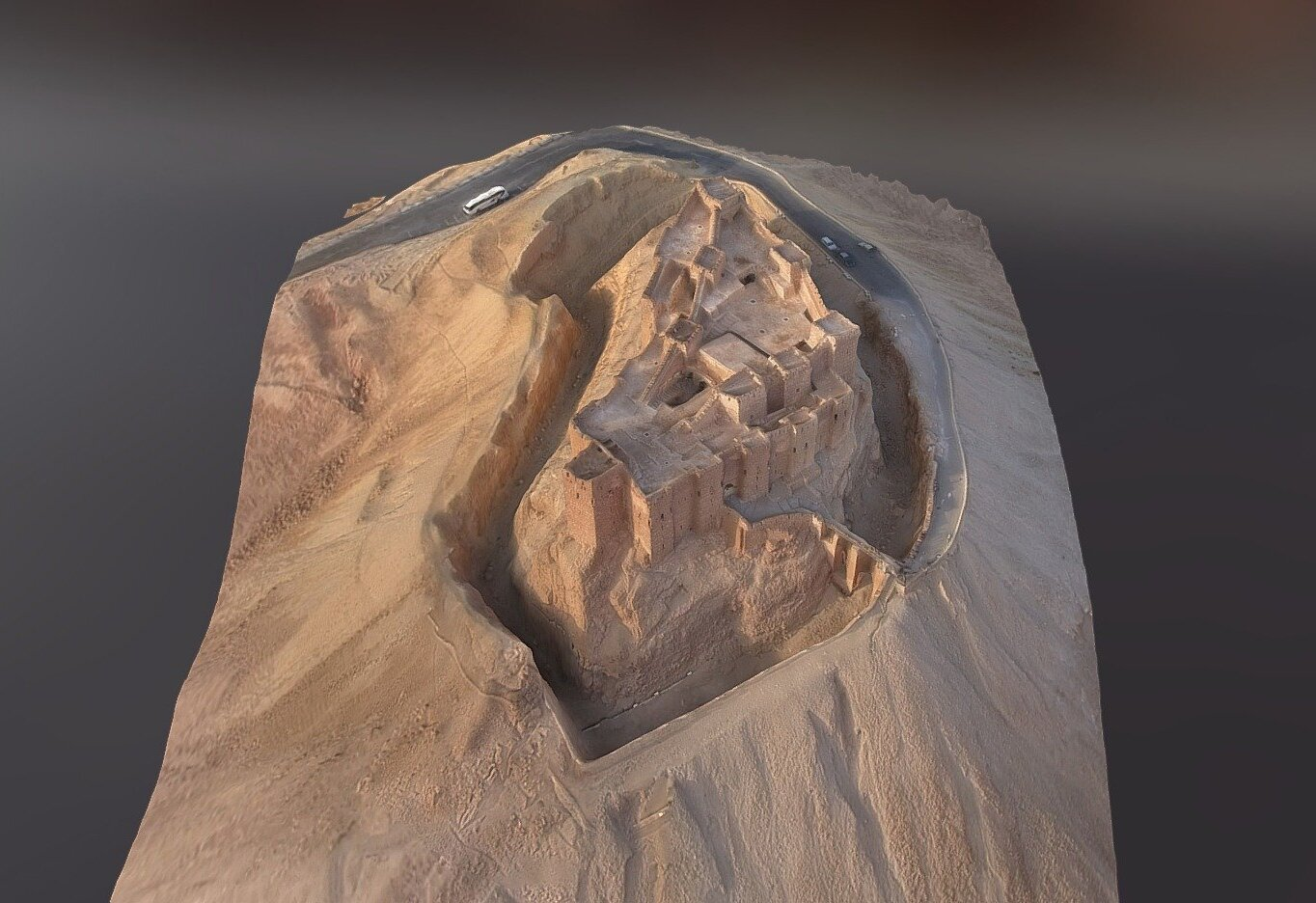
Photogrammetry of the castle

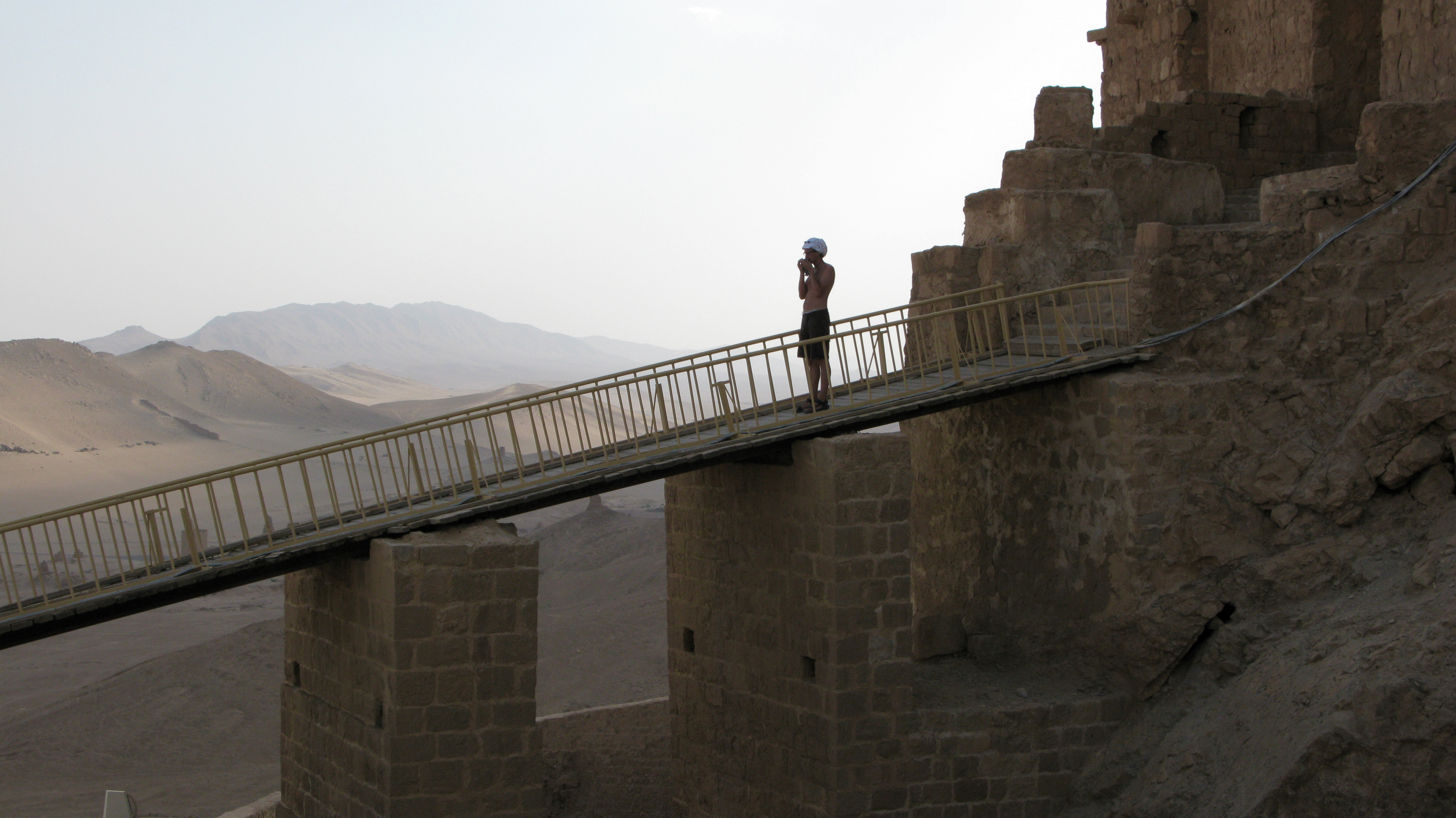
Passage

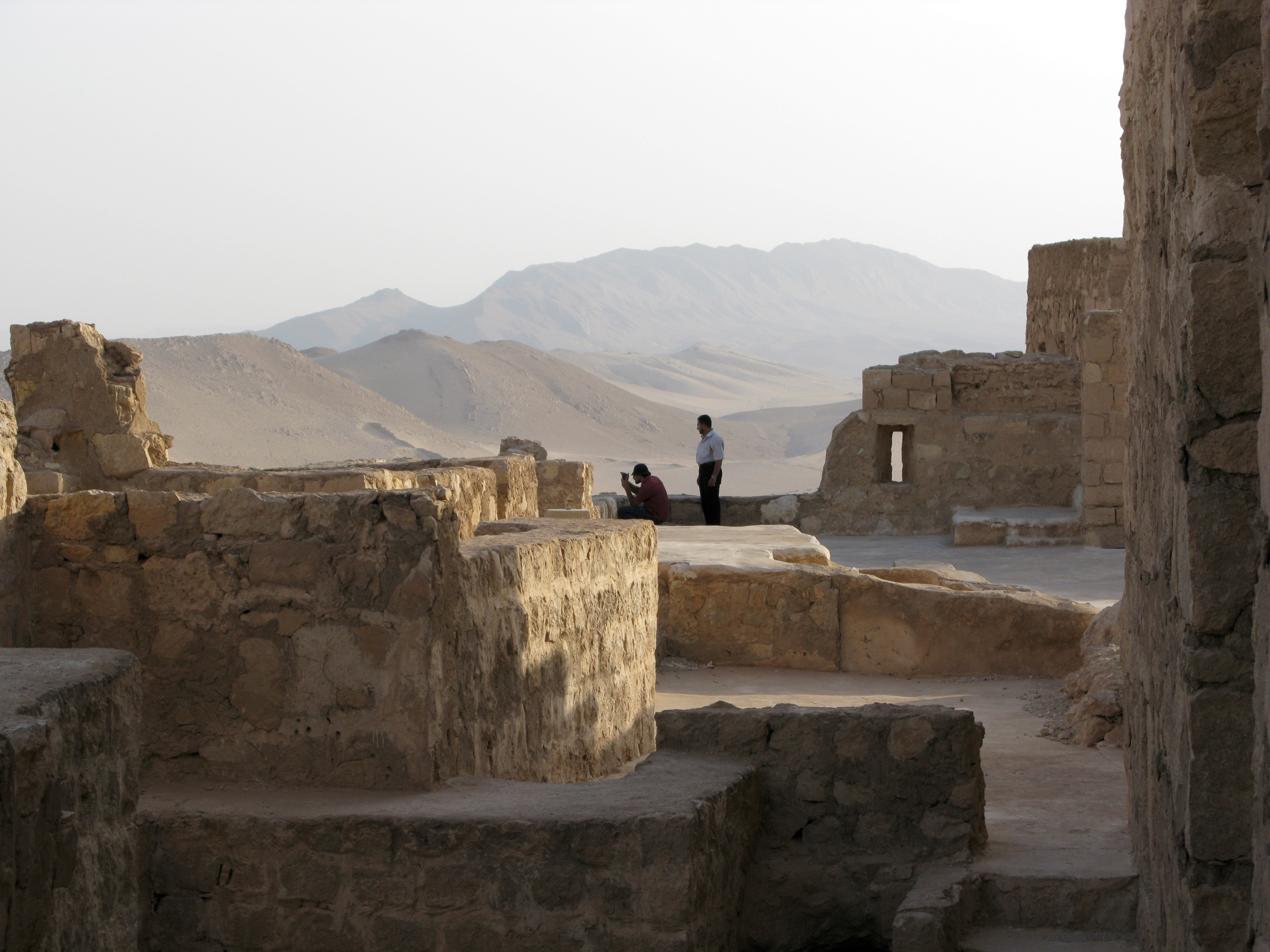
Walls

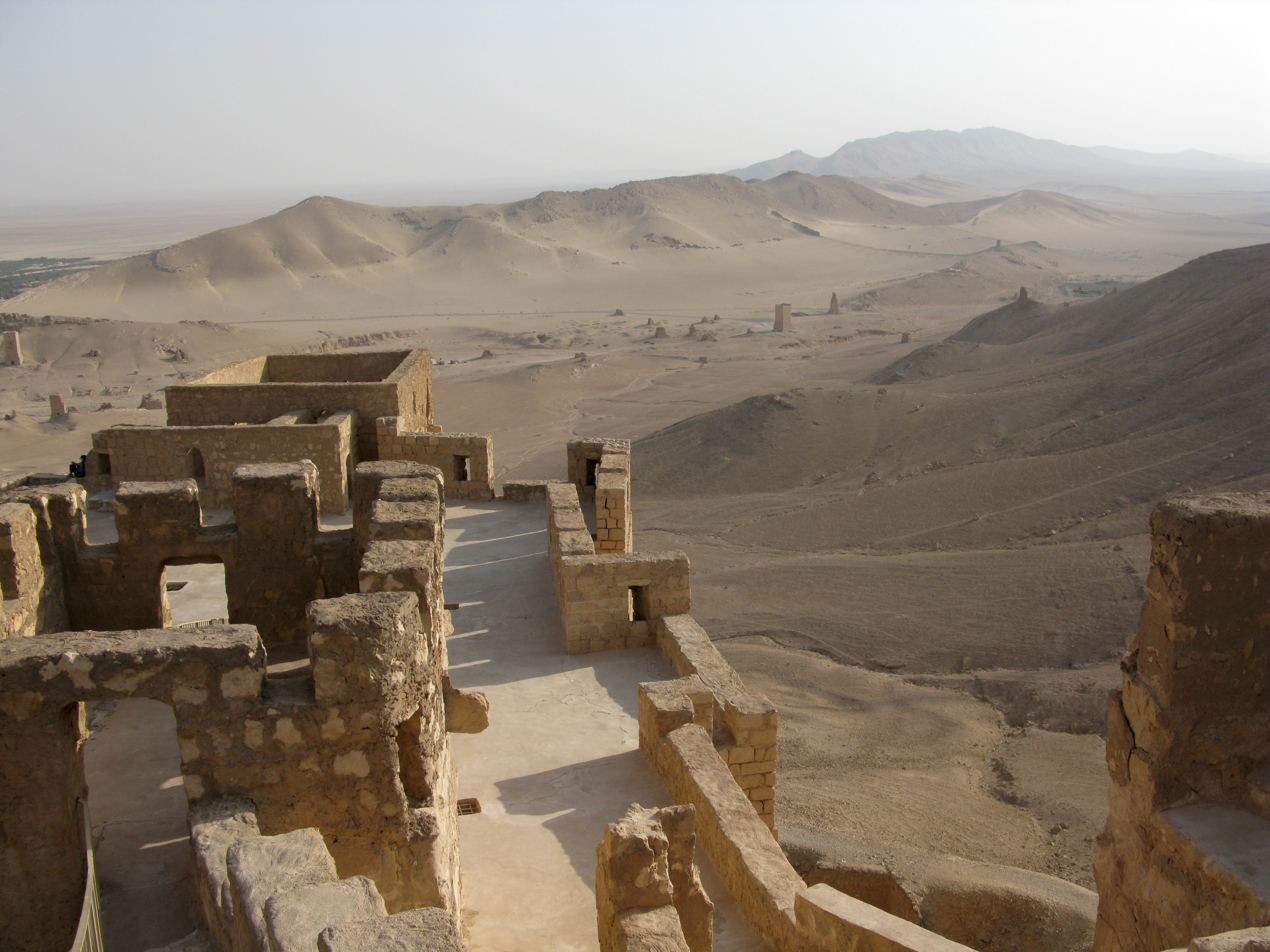
Rooftop

== See also ==
- List of castles in Syria
- List of World Heritage in Danger
- List of World Heritage Sites in the Arab States
- Al-Rahba
