= Military Security Shield Forces =

Syrian military intelligence unit

- قوات درع الأمن العسكري; Quwat Dir al-Amn al-Askari
- Emblem of the Military Security Shield Forces
- Leaders: Maj. Gen. Abu Ali Salhab (Main Commander); "The Uncle" Abu Ismail; Mudar Makhlouf; Hassan Mahfoudh; Sheikh Mohamed al-Milham
- Dates active: 2016 – ?
- Groups: Military Security Falcons; Southern Shield Brigade
- Active regions: Syria
- Size: 1300+ (2016)
- Part of: Military Intelligence Directorate (until 2024)
- Wars: the Syrian Civil War

The Military Security Shield Forces (Arabic: قوات درع الأمن العسكري, romanized: Quwat Dir’ al-Amn al-Askari), also called the Military Intelligence Shield Force or simply Military Shield, was a pro-Assad militia involved in the Syrian Civil War that was affiliated with the Military Intelligence Directorate.

== History ==
The Military Security Shield Forces were formed in January 2016 as a distinct paramilitary unit for the Military Intelligence Directorate's branch 223 of Latakia Governorate, probably in an attempt to further the latter's influence and to compensate for the widespread manpower shortages from which the government suffers since the civil war's beginning.

The new unit's first major engagement occurred during the 2015–16 Latakia offensive aiming at driving rebel forces completely from the Syrian Coastal Mountain Range. In March 2016, the militia deployed its forces to eastern Homs Governorate to participate in the government offensive to recapture Palmyra from ISIL. After the city's reconquest, some Military Shield fighters went on to post images of them posing with the severed head of an ISIL fighter. Most of the militia remained in the area around Palmyra for the remaining summer, though some of its fighters joined the Ithriyah-Raqqa offensive in June, which was ultimately a failure.

Since July 2016, the Military Security Shield Forces became very active in northern Latakia, helping to repel a local rebel offensive, and thereafter assisting in holding the local frontline, thereby cooperating closely with another new pro-government militia, Saraya al-Areen. Meanwhile, the Military Security Shield Forces also joined a major government campaign to encircle the rebel-held parts of Aleppo. In course of the fighting at Aleppo, the local Military Shield fighters under Mudar Makhlouf began to coordinate their operations with the Syrian Resistance and the Republican Guard-affiliated Popular Security and Support Forces. Soon after, one Military Shield contingent under Hassan Mahfoudh was also sent to Hama Governorate to bolster the local defences against a large-scale Jihadist-led rebel offensive.

Notably, the militia also joined Operation Dawn of Victory that saw the fall of the rebel strongholds in Aleppo, and therefore the end of the four-year-long battle for the city. In course of this offensive, images emerged that showed the group being advised by Russian military personnel.

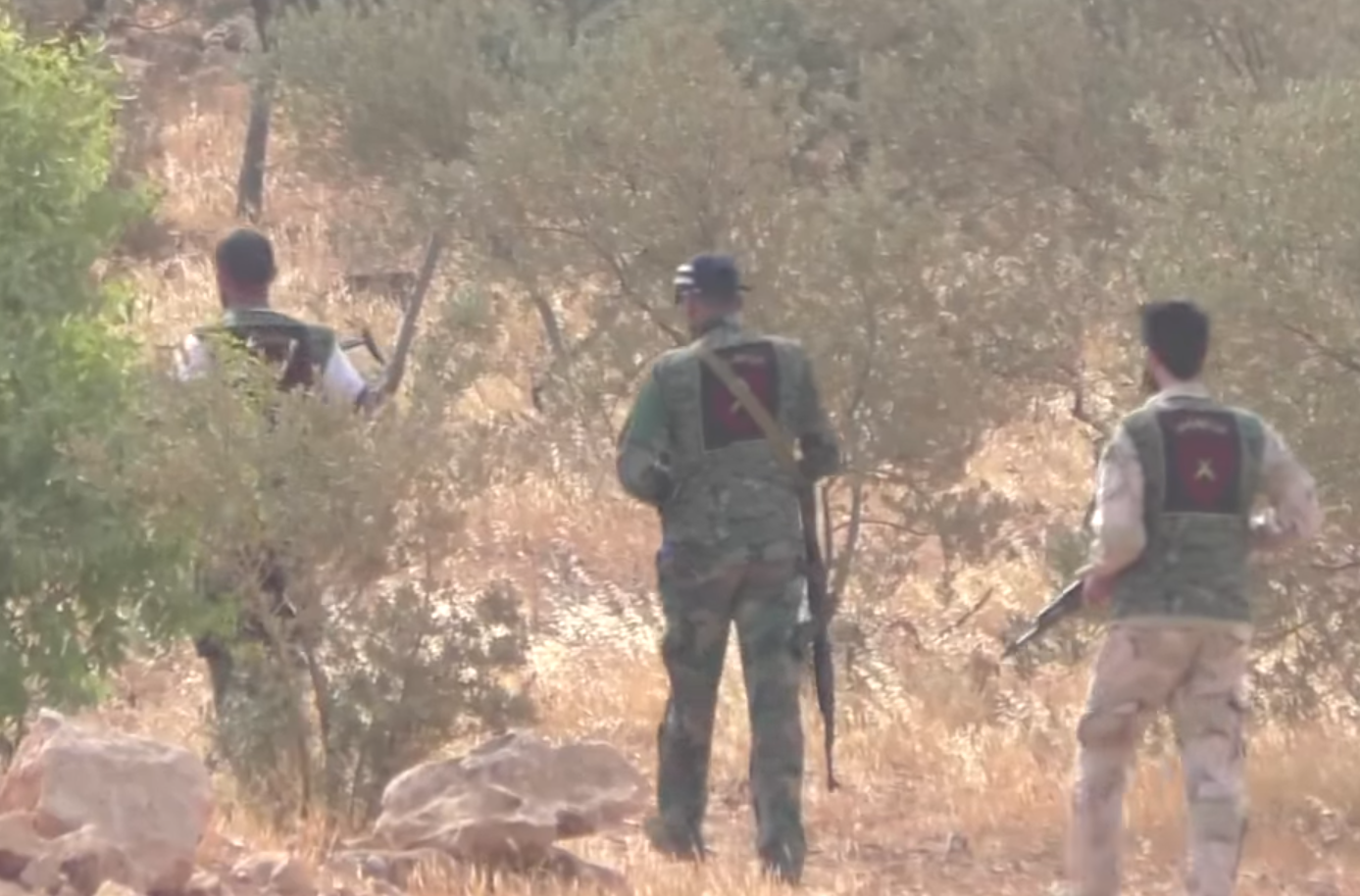
Military Shield militiamen on patrol in eastern Syria, September 2017.

A Military Shield detachment was present at the Palmyra frontline in December 2016, when ISIL launched a large-scale offensive in the area. This unit was later accused by the Tiger Forces to have fled in disarray after the first serious Islamist attacks, leaving Palmyra and Tadmor's remaining pro-government defenders to their fate. Soon after, Palmyra fell to ISIL, and the Military Security Shield Forces were among the pro-government units that sent reinforcements to help defend the nearby Tiyas Military Airbase from the next Islamist attack. The unit was also involved in the following government counter-offensive in the area. On 23 February 2017, al-Masdar News reported that over 900 Syrian Marines had joined the Military Security Shield Forces in order to avoid being drafted into the regular army. In June 2017, the Military Shield Forces took part in an anti-ISIL offensive in eastern Hama. Later that year, the militia took part in the battle to retake all of Deir ez-Zor city from ISIL. Afterwards, Military Shield militiamen began to garrison towns in eastern Syria which had been retaken from ISIL, such as Mayadin. The pro-opposition Syrian Observatory for Human Rights accused the militia of requisitioning food from local civilians during this time.

As the civil war increasingly turned in favor of the Syrian government, the latter began to gradually demobilize various loyalist militias. The Military Security Shield Forces were among those units that were scheduled in June 2018 to be eventually disbanded.

== Organization ==
Military Security Shield Forces have been accused of being financed by Syrian Sunni businessman Samer Foz, and of acting as the latter's private army.

=== Notable commanders ===
The Military Security Shield Forces have several commanders, two of whom are particularly notable:

- Abu Ismail, nicknamed "al-Khal" ("The Uncle") is from Qardaha, home village of the Al-Assad family, and was a companion of the famous Republican Guard commander Ali Khazzam, who was killed in 2012. Abu Ismail is a veteran of battles in Aleppo, Latakia, Idlib, Hama, Damascus and Daraa, and reportedly also leads several other units besides the Military Security Shield Forces, among them the Martyr Ali Khazzam Battalion of the Republican Guard. He commanded the Military Shield troops that were involved in the Palmyra offensive in March 2016, and was among the militiamen who posed with a killed ISIL fighter.
- Mudar Makhlouf is a long-standing Military Intelligence commander and personal acquaintance of Issam Zahreddine. Before joining the Military Security Shield Forces, he won some renown leading several Military Intelligence units in Deir ez-Zor against ISIL in 2014 and 2015. In this way he gained the nickname "Azra'il al-Dawa'ish" ("Angel of Death for the ISIL people").

=== Known sub-groups ===
- Military Security Falcons (Arabic: صقارة الأمن العسكري)
- Southern Shield Brigade (Arabic: لواء درع الجنوب)

== See also ==
- List of armed groups in the Syrian Civil War
- Military Intelligence Directorate (Syria)
