= Palmyra offensive (December 2016) =

2016 military operation of the Syrian Civil War

Coordinates: 34.5600°N 38.2672°E

- Part of the Syrian Civil War; Military intervention against ISIL; Russian military intervention in Syria; Iranian involvement in the Syrian Civil War and Hezbollah involvement in the Syrian Civil War
- Map showing the territory captured by ISIL since 8 December 2016.
Date	8–22 December 2016 (2 weeks)
Location	Tadmur District, Eastern Homs Governorate, Syria
Result	Partial ISIL victory: ISIL captures Palmyra on 11 December, as well as nearby oil fields and mountains; ISIL attack on the Tiyas Military Airbase fails, sporadic clashes continue around the airbase; Army starts a counter-offensive

Belligerents
Islamic State	Syria; Russia; Iran; Allied militias: Liwa Fatemiyoun; Liwa Zainebiyoun; Kata'ib al-Imam Ali; Hezbollah CJTF–OIR

Commanders and leaders
(Islamic State) "al-Mukahal" Amr As'ad † (Leading ISIL commander for Palmyra operations) (Islamic State) Abu Jandal al-Kuwaiti (ISIL senior commander, redeployed to Raqqa front after 11 December) (Islamic State) Abu Hafs al-Mashrifi (ISIL Security Chief in Homs) (Islamic State) Umar As'ad † (ISIL top commander)	Col. Ali Shaheen (leading operations commander 10–11 December); Maj. Gen. Suheil al-Hassan (leading operations commander since 14 December); Maj. Gen. Shawkat (Desert Commandos commander); Brig. Gen. Hussein Khader †; Malek Shafiq Omar † (Qalamoun Shield commander) (Russia) Maj. Sanal Sanchirov † (Air Assault battalion commander) (Iran) Brig. Gen. Hassan Akbari † (IRGC Ground Forces commander)

Units involved
(Islamic State) Military of ISIL	Syrian Armed Forces; Syrian Army; 10th Mechanised Division; 11th Armoured Division; 18th Armoured Division; Republican Guard; 800th Regiment; Tiger Forces; Shahin Group; Qalamoun Shield Forces; National Defence Forces; Palmyrene NDF garrison; Golan Regiment; Military Intelligence Directorate; Military Security Shield Forces; Desert Commandos Regiment; Air Force Intelligence Directorate; Fawj Nusur Homs; Syrian Air Force; Russian Armed Forces; Russian Air Force; Special operations forces advisors; Russian Airborne Troops; 56th Guards Air Assault Brigade advisors; (Iran) Iranian Armed Forces; IRGC; IRGC Ground Forces; Imam Ali ibn Abi Talib Corps of Qom Province; Liwa Fatemiyoun; Hazrat-e Abolfazl Brigade; Hezbollah: Radwan Force; Syrian Hezbollah units; Quwat al-Ridha; al-Ghalibun; Imam Mahdi Brigade

Strength
(Islamic State) 4,000–5,000 militants	3,000+ fighters (by the beginning of the offensive): c. 1,800–2,500 Military Shield and Al-Badiyah fighters; c. 1,200 Liwa Fatemiyoun fighters; 150–250 Tiger Forces soldiers; Unknown number of reinforcements: 100+ Hezbollah fighters (since 14 December)

Casualties and losses
(Islamic State) 149 killed (per The Inside Source); 630 killed (pro-government claims)	100 killed, 200 wounded and 30 missing (per the Army); 182 killed (per SOHR); 352 killed, 22 captured (pro-ISIL claim)

The Palmyra offensive in December 2016 was a military operation launched by the military of ISIL which led to the re-capture of the ancient city of Palmyra, and an unsuccessful ISIL attack on the Tiyas T-4 Airbase to the west of the city. ISIL previously controlled the city from May 2015 until March 2016.

The unexpected blitz offensive occurred concurrently with three major anti-ISIL offensives: the Turkish Western al-Bab offensive and Battle of al-Bab north of Aleppo, the Kurdish-Arab Raqqa campaign, and the Iraqi Battle of Mosul in Iraq, which saw all three gaining ground from the Islamic State.

In January 2017, the Syrian Army and allied forces launched another offensive to recapture Palmyra and its surrounding areas.

== Background ==
ISIL captured the ancient city of Palmyra in May 2015 after the Syrian Arab Army (SAA) withdrew from the town. The Syrian Army recaptured the city in March 2016. The group however still held territory in the eastern Homs Governorate and had started carrying out insurgent attacks on the Syrian Army after losing the city. The city is historically and internationally important and the offensive comes at the same time that ISIL is being targeted militarily at its headquarters of Mosul and Raqqa. Palmyra is also strategically important as it is close to oil fields. The offensive was launched at a moment when the Syrian and Russian militaries were focused on the Aleppo offensive. The Tiyas Military Airbase is near to the city. It is an important security installation for the Syrian Army as it provides them with close air support. It would also be difficult to recapture Palmyra without it.

== Offensive ==
=== ISIL capture of Palmyra ===
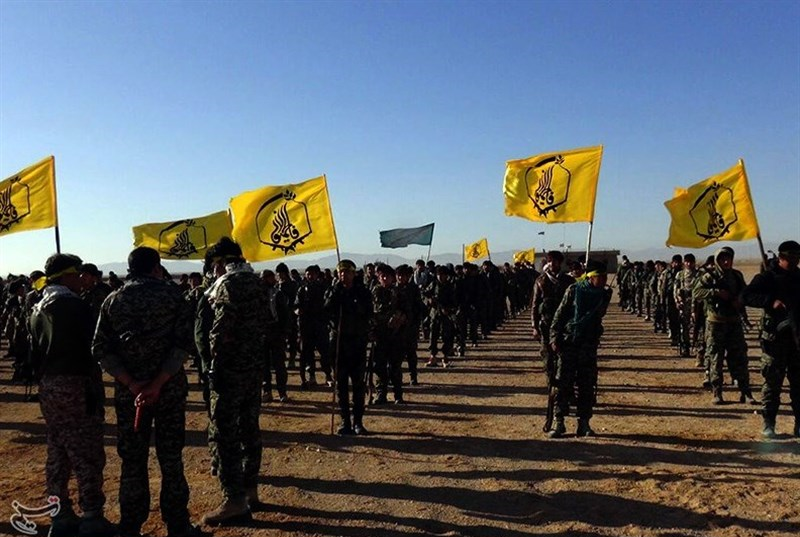
Liwa Fatemiyoun militiamen gather outside of Palmyra on 10 December in an attempt to counter the ISIL offensive.

ISIL launched the offensive in the northeastern countryside of Homs on 8 December 2016, targeting the SAA's defenses near the village of Huwaysis and the Jazal Mountains located north of Palmyra. The group began the attack by sending two waves of fighters to storm its defenses near Huwaysis, resulting in heavy clashes. It was however unable to penetrate the first line of defense and was forced to withdraw. Local media reported that 60 militants were killed, while eight of their armored vehicles were destroyed.

The group launched another assault later in the day, with simultaneous attacks near the Jazal, Mahr and Shaer oil and gas fields as well as the areas of Huwaysis, Arak, Palmyra Silos, al-Hayyal Mount, al-Sekkary, the ancient al-Hallabat Palace and an abandoned base near the T4 airbase. It was able to capture seven checkpoints from the Army, which withdrew after heavy clashes. In addition, it also captured the al-Hallabat Palace, al-Hayyal Mount, South Sawamea and Huwaysis. At least 34 pro-government fighters were killed and four, including an officer, were captured. With these advances, the group came within 4 kilometres (2.5 mi) of Palmyra. The group also captured grain silos northeast of Palmyra as well as the Jazal village and its oil fields. Meanwhile, Combined Joint Task Force – Operation Inherent Resolve launched a massive air-raid on an Islamic State fleet of 168 oil tanker trucks, destroying them.

The SAA counter-attacked on 9 December, to recapture the positions it lost the previous day, in addition to bringing in reinforcements and launching airstrikes. 15 soldiers were killed in an ISIL ambush near the Mahr oil field. The Islamic State captured the al-Berej hills, Jihar oil fields, Mahr oil fields as well as a checkpoint near it during the clashes.

On 10 December, Army reinforcements arrived in Palmyra. At least 45 militants were killed by the Army, with three Islamic State tanks destroyed near Palmyra Silos. An earlier assault by the group on the silos had failed, but it was able to capture them later on, thus reaching the entrance to Palmyra. The Russian and Syrian Air Forces targeted ISIL positions in oil fields around Palmyra, destroying several armoured vehicles and a number of technical vehicles. A Syrian Air Force MiG-23 crashed in the Jazal area. ISIL claimed to have shot it down, while the Syrian Observatory for Human Rights (SOHR) reported it was not known whether it crashed due to technical fault or was shot down. Clashes also started taking place around Wadi al-Ahmar where the Army brought reinforcements. The group later captured the Tar Mountain to the west of the city, in addition to the northern suburb of Amiriyeh, and entered Palmyra. By the end of the day, they had captured most of the city, including Palmyra Castle, and were on the verge of taking full control of Palmyra. Palmyra's residents were evacuated in the evening by the Army.

Early on 11 December, after the arrival of reinforcements, the Syrian Army, backed by Syrian and Russian air units, launched a successful counterattack to drive out ISIL forces from the city. The militants withdrew to the orchards on the fringes of Palmyra. According to the Russian Ministry of Defense, ISIL suffered over 300 dead. However, later in the day, ISIL launched a new assault on Palmyra after regrouping, entering the city once again and capturing Amiriyeh, its hilltop and the Officers Housing complex. Eventually, ISIL took full control of the city as the Army withdrew south of Palmyra.

=== Attack on Tiyas Airbase ===
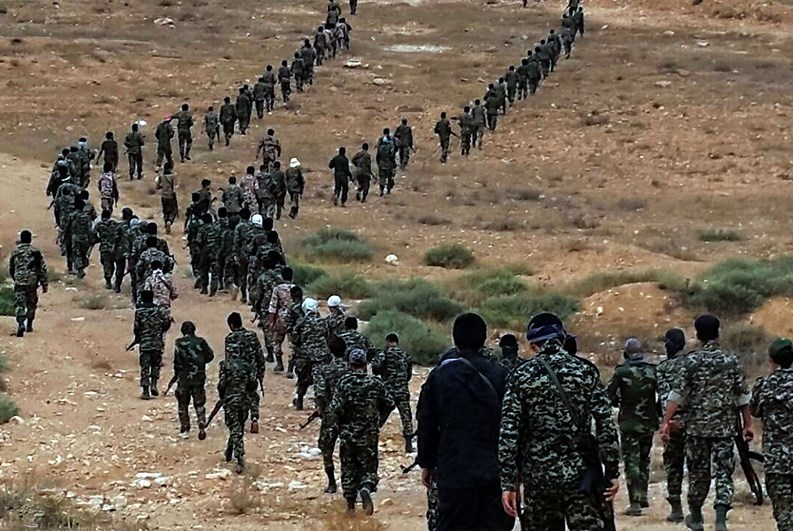
Liwa Fatemiyoun troops near Palmyra during the offensive

ISIL started advancing westwards from Palmyra to the Tiyas Military Airbase (also called al-Taifor and T4 airbase) after the city's capture on 11 December. The group captured two villages to the west of city during the day. It also captured an abandoned base to the west of the airbase. Early on 12 December, ISIL launched an attack against the strategically important Jihar Crossroad near the airbase, and captured it after heavy clashes. It later captured security checkpoints in the nearby districts of Mashtal and Qasr al-Hir, allowing it to launch an attack against the airbase spearheaded by two car bombs, resulting in an hours-long battle with the entrenched SAA defenders. Aided by numerous Russian airstrikes, the government forces eventually repelled the assault, as ISIL forces regrouped for another attempt at breaching the airbase's defenses. Meanwhile, hundreds of pro-government reinforcements arrived at the frontline, which belonged to the National Defence Forces-affiliated Qalamoun Shield and Golan Regiment. Russia carried out airstrikes against ISIL in Palmyra, killing five people.

The group attacked the airbase again on 13 December, after advancing around it in an attempt to besiege it. Reinforcements from the Syrian Army and Russian special forces arrived to the base later in the day. During the day, ISIL advanced on a checkpoint on the road to Al-Qaryatayn, eventually capturing it and cutting the road. The road was a main supply route for the Syrian Army in Homs Governorate and had been used to supply military reinforcements to the airbase as well as Homs city from Al-Qaryatayn. Meanwhile, an assault by the militants on the Tiyas pumping station during the night was repelled. The clashes renewed on 14 December, with the Army trying to regain areas it previously lost around the airbase. The Army recaptured the Tiyas Mountain as well as the abandoned base located in the north of the airbase after launching a counteroffensive during the early morning. It also regained checkpoints on the road to al-Qaryatayn it had lost a day earlier. ISIL meanwhile captured al-Sharifah village to the west of the airbase. Later that day, ISIL launched another attack on the airbase, but thanks to newly arrived government reinforcements, belonging to the paratrooper forces of the Republican Guard's 800th Regiment, the assault was repelled. The following night, a SAA counter-attack drove ISIL from the airbase's outskirts.

The US-led coalition stated on 16 December that it had carried out airstrikes near the airbase against ISIL on the previous day, destroying the heavy weaponry it seized after recapturing Palmyra. An air defense artillery system, 14 tanks, three artillery systems, two ISIL-held buildings and two tactical vehicles were destroyed in total. The strikes reportedly killed at least 38 militants. The Syrian Army launched another counterattack on 16 December, recapturing the Qaryatayn-T4 crossroads area. They later also recaptured the road between al-Sharifah and al-Qaryatyn and reopened the direct route between al-Qaryatayn and the airbase. Umar As'ad, a leader of ISIL, was killed in the clashes. The Army recaptured a checkpoint near al-Qaryatayn on 17 December. Another attack by ISIL later in the day was repelled, while the Army captured Al-Sha'arah Hills to the north of the abandoned base. ISIL launched another attack on the airbase on 19 December and shot down a Russian helicopter. The attack failed with 36 ISIL fighters being killed. At least 20 pro-government fighters were killed in it while a helicopter was shot down, leaving its two pilots dead. Clashes took place between the two sides on outskirts of Abu Kala Dam as well as other areas near the airbase on 20 December. ISIL was also repeatedly attacking the abandoned base in order to retake it. On 22 December, ISIL launched another attack in the morning, which failed. The militants launched another assault later on, which was also repelled. The group was then driven back to Palmyra. At the same time, a US airstrike killed the leading ISIL commander for the Palmyra frontline, Amr As'ad.

== Aftermath – sporadic clashes and SAA counteroffensive ==
Sporadic clashes continued to occur around the airbase, with 13 soldiers killed in an ISIL attack on al-Sharifa on 24 December. ISIL launched another assault on 26 December, storming the Syrian Army's position west of the Badiyah area of Palmyra and then on its positions north of the Sha'rah Hills before being repelled. Clashes broke out again near the airbase and al-Sharifa during the day, with the Syrian Army advancing in the area. On 29 December, the Syrian Army secured the hilltops surrounding Sharifah village. The following day, the military recaptured the village. Clashes were reported in the area on 31 December, with pro-government forces trying to recapture the village.

Clashes re-erupted on 2 January 2017, around al-Sharifah and the airbase in addition to the Fourth Station. On 4 January, it was reported that ISIL was withdrawing from the areas around the Tiyas airbase. Some clashes continued near the airbase after 5 January.

On 12 January 2017, the Syrian Army launched the Eastern Homs offensive to retake Palmyra.

== Diplomatic reactions ==
On 12 December 2016, Russian Foreign Minister Sergey Lavrov commented that the Islamic State's offensive in Palmyra may have been "orchestrated" to distract forces from militants in eastern Aleppo, and ISIL's reinforcements then moved from Mosul to Palmyra via routes which could have been blocked by the US-led coalition's aviation. A spokesman for Russian Defense Ministry Igor Konashenkov stated that the Islamic State made use of pause in the Mosul and Raqqah offensives to shift reinforcements to Palmyra, and that ISIL were sure that these offensives would not be immediately renewed. Konashenkov commented that the government setbacks at Palmyra shows that the Islamic State should not be allowed to regroup.

French Foreign Minister Jean-Marc Ayrault stated that the proof of Russia's stated aim of targeting militants in Syria being false lay in reports that ISIL had retaken Palmyra, while accusing it of being there to save Assad's government and "making Aleppo fall".

== See also ==
- Siege of Deir ez-Zor (2014–17)
- Raqqa campaign (2016–2017)
- Eastern Homs offensive (2017)
