= Ithriyah-Raqqa offensive =

Ithriyah-Raqqa offensive may refer to:

- Ithriyah-Raqqa offensive (February–March 2016)
- Ithriyah-Raqqa offensive (June 2016)
