= East Hama offensive (2017) =

Military operation of the Syrian civil war

Coordinates: 34.5600°N 38.2672°E

Eastern Hama offensive (2017)
- Part of the Syrian Civil War and the Russian military intervention in Syria
Date	31 May – 18 June 2017 (2 weeks and 4 days)
Location	Salamiyah District, Eastern Hama Governorate, Syria
Result	Limited Army gains: Offensive stalled; Syrian army capture 2 towns, 4 villages and a hilltop

Belligerents
(Syria) Syrian Arab Republic Russia; Allied militias: Liwa al-Quds; Hezbollah	Islamic State of Iraq and the Levant

Units involved
Syrian Armed Forces; Syrian Army; 10th Mechanised Division; 11th Armored Division; 18th Armoured Division; 5th Corps; al-Assad / Lion Shield Forces; ISIL Hunters; Republican Guard; 800th Regiment; Syrian Marines; Tiger Forces; Qalamoun Shield Forces; National Defence Forces; Golan Regiment; al-Shaitat tribe militias; Military Intelligence Directorate; Military Security Shield Forces; Desert Commandos Regiment; Air Force Intelligence Directorate; Fawj Nusur Homs; Syrian Air Force; Russian Armed Forces; Russian Air Force; Special operations forces advisors; Hezbollah; Radwan Forces; Syrian Hezbollah units; al-Ridha Forces; al-Ghalibun; Imam Mahdi Brigade	(Islamic State) Military of ISIL

The Eastern Hama offensive (2017) was a military operation conducted by the Syrian Army against Islamic State of Iraq and the Levant (ISIL) with the goal to secure the Ithriyah-Sheikh Hilal road, the government supply line towards Aleppo, and advance towards Wadi Auzain.

== The offensive ==
On 31 May, the Syrian Arab Army and its allies, supported by the Russian Air Force, began an offensive towards the IS stronghold of Uqayribat, in the eastern part of the Salamiyah District in Hama Governorate. The next day, a new batch of government reinforcements arrived for the offensive. Uqayribat had been used by ISIL as a launching pad for attacks on Salamiyah. On 3 June, Syrian and Russian warplanes carried out more than 30 air strikes ISIL positions. Heavy artillery and missiles were also used.

During the morning of 5 June, the Syrian Arab Army, supported by the NDF, started an operation on a second axis against ISIL to the south of Sheikh Hilal. Before the ground attack, ISIL positions were hit by non-stop air strikes and artillery shelling. The next day, the Army captured two towns south-east of Sheikh Hilal.

On 12 June, the Syrian Army sent technicals, anti-aircraft guns and artillery pieces mounted on trucks to the area. Four days later, government forces restarted the offensive, capturing the large hilltop of Tal Dabbart Debah and then shifting their attention to the Aqareb Dam. During 18 June, the Army captured four villages north of Uqayribat, along the road between Ithriya and Al-Saan.

== Aftermath ==
The following month, Desert Hawks alongside the NDF and Liwa al-Quds secured the villages of Um Tuwaynah, al-Hardaneh and al-Qatshiyah, south of the Salamiyah-Ithriyah road, thus securing the supply line to Aleppo city.

== See also ==
- Battle of Raqqa (2017)
- Deir ez-Zor campaign (2017–2019)
- Eastern Syria campaign (September–December 2017)
