= 11th Armored Division (Syria) =

- الفرقة 11 مدرعة
- Divisional tactical color marking
- Active: 1982–2024
- Country: Ba'athist Syria (surrendered)
- Allegiance: Syrian Arab Armed Forces (surrendered)
- Branch: Syrian Arab Army (surrendered)
- Type: Armored division
- Role: Armored warfare
- Size: 11,000 soldiers (2018)
- Part of: 3rd Corps (surrendered)
- Garrison/HQ: Homs
- Engagements: Syrian Civil War; Idlib Governorate clashes (September 2011 – March 2012); Rif Dimashq offensive (November 2012–February 2013); Siege of Abu al-Duhur Airbase; Second Siege of Wadi Deif; 2015 Idlib offensive; Battle of Idlib (2015); Northwestern Syria offensive (April–June 2015); Al-Ghab offensive (July–August 2015); 2016 Khanasir offensive; Battle of al-Qaryatayn (2016); 2016 Hama offensive; East Hama offensive (2017); Palmyra offensive (2017); Hama offensive (March–April 2017); Hama offensive (September 2017); Operation Dawn of Idlib

Commanders
- Current Commander: Maj. Gen. Muhammad Deeb
- Brigade Commanders: Brig. Gen. Ramez Sultan (87th Brigade)
- Notable commanders: Lt. Gen. Ali al-Hussain †

11th Armored Division (Arabic: الفرقة 11 مدرعة) was an elite formation of the Syrian Army. In 2019, the 11th Armored Division participated in the Operation Dawn of Idlib. The division was established in 1982 and was part of the 3rd Army Corps.

== Command structure ==
11th Armored Division (2019)

- 60th Armored Brigade
- 67th Armored Brigade
- 87th Mechanized Brigade
- 89th Artillery Regiment
- 135th Artillery Regiment

== Combat history ==
In 1982, after the Battle of Sultan Yacoub in Southern Lebanon between the Syrian and Israeli forces, Syrians captured 11 Israeli M48 Patton tanks. For that, late Commander in Chief President of Syria Hafez al-Assad instructed the establishment of a new armored division, with the number designation 11.

=== Syrian Civil War ===
The 11th Armored Division is part of 3rd Army Corps, as it was a reserve armored division and one of the best armored divisions of the Syrian Army. It was placed in active duty during the crisis. The 11th Armored Division first took part in combat operations from autumn 2011 to spring 2012, when it was part of the Army's offensive in Idlib Governorate. Until then, several units of the division took part in the most complex Siege of Abu al-Duhur Airbase between 2012 and 2015, where the army eventually suffered heavy losses and defeat.

In 2015, the division took part in the spring and autumn campaign, which ended with the defeat of the army forces and the loss of the city and province of Idlib, the Al-Ghab Plains and part of the province of Hama In 2016, the division led the Syrian Army's counter offensive in Hama., which featured the participation of the division's 87th Mechanized Brigade and 47th Regiment. During the operation, the unit lost its commander Brig. Gen. Ali Khallouf and Maj. Gen. Ali Sharaf Makhlouf, commander of 87th Brigade.

In 2017, the division took part of two government offensives, during which the Army recaptured all lost territory in previous years. Units of the 87th Brigade have held the highly contested Suran-Masasneh axis since 2016. Several members of the 87th Brigade died in a March 3, 2019 raid on a checkpoint there. Meanwhile, the 60th and 67th Brigades and the 135th Regiment have mostly fought on the eastern edges of the Homs Governorate, particularly around Palmyra as well as throughout Deir ez-Zor. Since 2019, the 11th Division has been reorganized with Russian help and supervision.
