= Tribal Army =

Tribal Army may refer to:

- Galway United F.C., which is nicknamed the "Tribal Army"
- Forces of the Fighters of the Tribes, which are also known as the "Tribal Army"
