= 18th Armoured Division (Syria) =

- الفرقة المدرعة الثامنة عشر
- Syrian Armed Forces Flag
- Active: Unknown – 2024
- Country: Ba'athist Syria
- Allegiance: Syrian Arab Armed Forces
- Branch: Syrian Army
- Type: Armoured division
- Role: Armoured warfare
- Size: ~ 7,000 soldiers (2018)
- Part of: 3rd Corps
- Garrison/HQ: Aleppo
- Engagements: Syrian Civil War; Siege of Homs; Palmyra offensive (May 2015); Palmyra offensive (July–August 2015); Palmyra offensive (March 2016); Palmyra offensive (December 2016); Eastern Homs offensive (2017); East Hama offensive (2017); Central Syria campaign (2017); Northwestern Syria campaign (October 2017–February 2018); Operation Idlib Dawn I

Commanders
- Current Commander: Maj. Gen. Adam Fayyad
- Deputy Commander: Maj. Gen. Habib Ahmed Ibrahim
- Notable commanders: Maj. Gen. Mohammad Nayouf

The 18th Armoured Division (Arabic: الفرقة المدرعة الثامنة عشر or الفرقة المدرعة 18) was one of two autonomous reserve divisions of the Syrian Arab Army prior to the fall of Ba'athist Syria, the other being the 17th Division. The 18th Division is part of the 3rd Corps. It was the smallest conventional division in the Syrian Arab Army with only about 7,000 men.

== Command structure ==
18th Armoured Division (2020)

- 131st Armoured Brigade
- 134th Armoured Brigade
- 167th Armoured Brigade
- 120th Mechanized Brigade
- 64th Artillery Regiment

== Combat history ==
=== Syrian Civil War ===
The division was in a reserve role leading up to the summer of 2013. Since then it has been heavily engaged in the Syrian Civil War.

The European Council named Major General Wajih Mahmud as commander of the 18th Armored Division in the Official Journal of the European Union on 15 November 2011, sanctioning him for violence committed in Homs. Henry Boyd of the IISS noted that "... in Homs, the 18th Armored Division was reinforced by Special Forces units and ... by elements of the 4th Division under Maher’s de facto command."

On 13 August, clashes took place in Deir ez-Zor city in the Rashdin suburb, as army attempted to liberate it from the militants. Rebels earlier attacked the cardiac hospital in the city, no reports of losses. 4 rebels killed by clashes in al-Jbeila, Hawiqa and Sina'a neighborhoods.

As of 20 August, the western Hawiqa neighborhood, including the local Baath Party headquarters, had fallen to the rebels. The opposition claimed that 160 government soldiers and dozens of rebels had died in the fight for Hawiqa. Government forces retaliated by bombarding the rebels from their positions in the Joura and Ghazi Ayyash districts. The Free Syrian Army-affiliated Ahfad al-Rasul Brigade, recently supplied by Qatar with anti-aircraft missiles, played an important role in taking Hawiqa.

On the same day, the Army hit rebel forces in Hawiqa district with tanks and multiple rocket launchers, and also battled them in territory separating Hawiqa from the district of Joura, opposition sources in the city said. The government was trying to regain Hawiqa because it could not afford the rebels to be so close to its most important stronghold of Joura and the Army camp there. Air force intelligence and military intelligence, two important security compounds in the city, were also located in the nearby Ghazi Ayyash district, and came within the range of rebel rocket-propelled grenades.

Researchers estimated in late 2019 that the 167th Brigade was the last remaining operational brigade of the division. In addition, "as of November 2018, the division consisted of only 4,000 men — including reservists and civilian employees — largely concentrated within the 167th Brigade".

== See also ==
- National Defense Force
- 17th Reserve Division
- Republican Guard
