= Valery Flyustikov =

Russian military commander, lieutenant general

Major General Valery Ivanovich Flyustikov (Russian: Валерий Иванович Флюстиков) is a Russian military officer. Since 2018, he has served as the commander of the Russian Special Operations Forces replacing Aleksandr Matovnikov.

== Sanctions ==
In April 2022, lieutenant general Flyustikov was added to the British government's sanctions list, in relation to the Russian invasion of Ukraine.
