= Hama offensive (September 2017) =

Military offensive

- Part of the Syrian Civil War and Russian military intervention in the Syrian Civil War
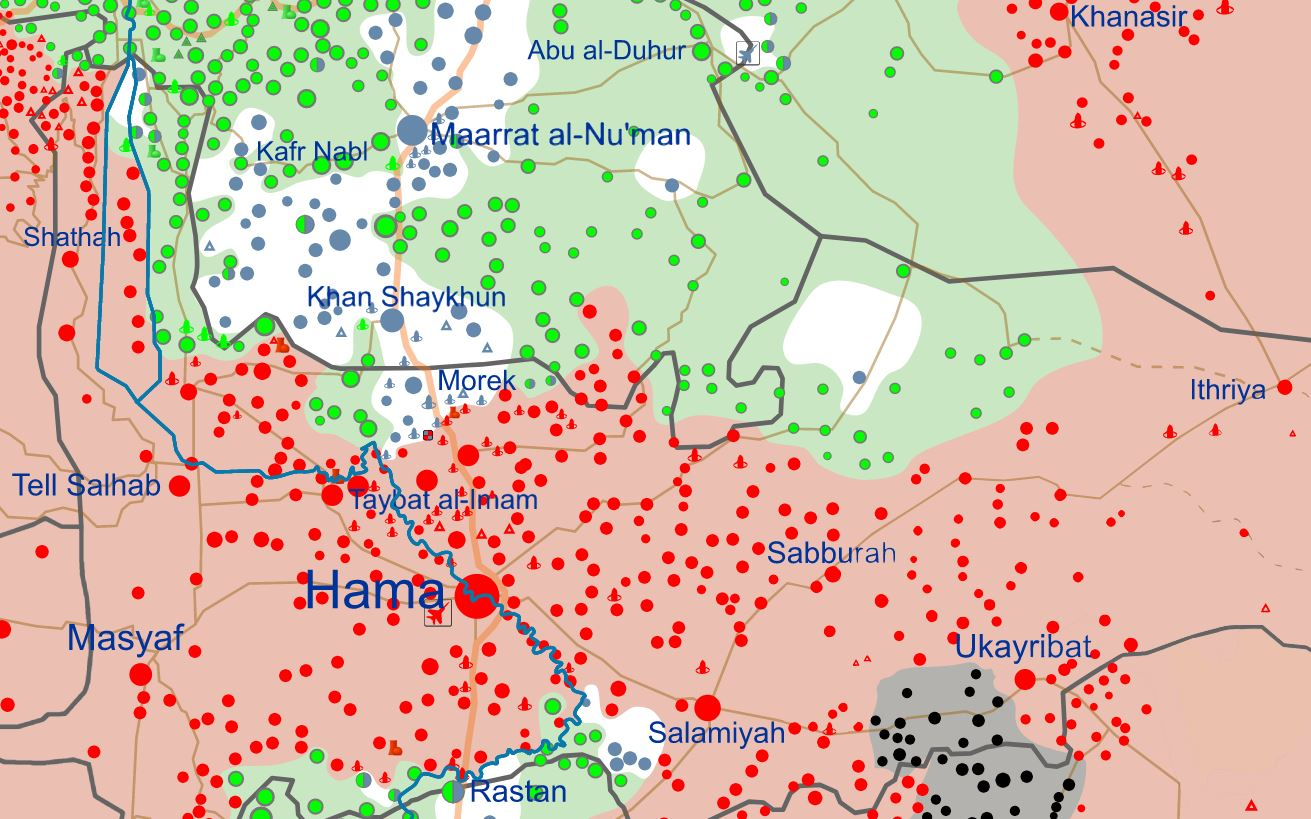
- Military situation in the northern Hama Governorate and the southern Idlib Governorate on 23 September 2017.
Date	19–29 September 2017 (1 week and 3 days)
Location	Northwestern Syria: Northern Hama Governorate; Southern Idlib Governorate
Result	Inconclusive: Rebels initially captured four villages, before they were recaptured by the Syrian Army; Syrian Army counter-attack captured an additional two villages, before they were recaptured by the rebels

Belligerents
Hay'at Tahrir al-Sham; Turkistan Islamic Party in Syria; Ahrar al-Sham (Syrian opposition) Free Syrian Army	(Syria) Syrian Arab Republic; Russia

Commanders and leaders
Abu Mohammad al-Julani (Leader of Hayat Tahrir al-Sham) Abu Sulman al-Saudi †; Abu al-Abbas Anadin †; Abu Hasan †; Walid al-Mustafa †; Abu Mudjagid †	(Syria) Unknown (Russia) Maj. Gen. Viktor Shuliak (Deputy commander of Russian Reconciliation Center) (Russia) Maj. Gen. Alexander Matovnikov (SOF commander)

Units involved
(Syrian opposition) Free Syrian Army; (Syrian opposition) Free Idlib Army; (Syrian opposition) Jaysh al-Nasr; Jaysh al-Izza; Sham Legion	Syrian Armed Forces; Syrian Army; 8th Armored Division; 11th Armored Division; 47th Brigade; Tiger Forces; National Defence Forces; Syrian Air Force; Homeland Shield Forces; Russian Armed Forces; Russian Ground Forces; Military Police; Russian Air Force; Russian Navy; Wagner Group; Special operations forces advisors

Casualties and losses
168 killed (per SOHR); 850 killed (per Russia; 19 – 21 Sep)	(Syria) 42 killed (Russia) 3 wounded
- 197 civilians killed

The Hama offensive (September 2017), code-named Oh Servants of God, Be Steadfast, was a military offensive launched by rebel groups led by Hay'at Tahrir al-Sham (HTS) north of the city Hama, as part of the Syrian Civil War.

== Background ==
In March 2017, rebels led by Hay'at Tahrir al-Sham launched an unsuccessful offensive against the Syrian Armed Forces north of Hama. Although they achieved territorial gains in the first month of the offensive, occupying more than double the territory, after seven days, a counter-offensive was launched by government forces and their allies, recapturing territory. By April, government forces fully expelled the rebels from the initial position of the offensive.

== The offensive ==
=== Prelude ===
A Russian military police platoon (29 servicemen) deployed as part of the de-escalation observation forces in the Idlib de-escalation zone was on the night of 18 September encircled and trapped by rebels, including Jabhat al-Nusra, as a result of their offensive against the Syrian troops positioned north and northeast of Hama; the encirclement was breached by Russian forces several hours later by the early hours of 19 September in a special operation leaving three servicemen of the Special Operations Forces were wounded in the rescue operation. The Russian ministry stated that according to their intelligence, the rebels′ ″offensive was initiated by the US special agencies in order to stop the successful advance of the Syrian Arab Army to the east from Deir ez-Zor″.

=== Hay'at Tahrir al-Sham-led offensive ===
On 19 September, members of Hay'at Tahrir al-Sham, alongside the TIP and militants aligned to the FSA, launched an offensive on pro-government and Russian Armed Forces positions overseeing the process of the de-escalation of the zone in the province of Idlib following an agreement with Turkey and Iran in negotiations in Astana in May 2017. Reports of the ensuing fighting were contradictory. The rebels initially captured four villages, but after back-and-forth fighting during which the villages changed hands several times, government forces recaptured all of the villages by 22 September. Russia stated it had killed 850 rebel fighters by 21 September. In contrast, SOHR reported that 66 rebels and 38 soldiers were killed during the offensive, as well as more than 40 civilians over two days in nearly 500 air-strikes on about 40 towns and villages in retaliation for the rebel offensive. There were also rebel claims of government and Russian airstrikes on civilian targets in Idlib, including medical facilities. The Russian Air Force and Russian Navy conducted air and cruise missile strikes against HTS targets, reportedly including a large military camp. The US State Department accused Syria and Russia, besides bombing civilian targets, of also targeting medical facilities. One of the three allegedly bombed hospitals was the al-Rahma clinic in Khan Shaykhun, which treated victims of the chemical attack there in April.

=== Syrian Army counter-attack and air-strikes ===
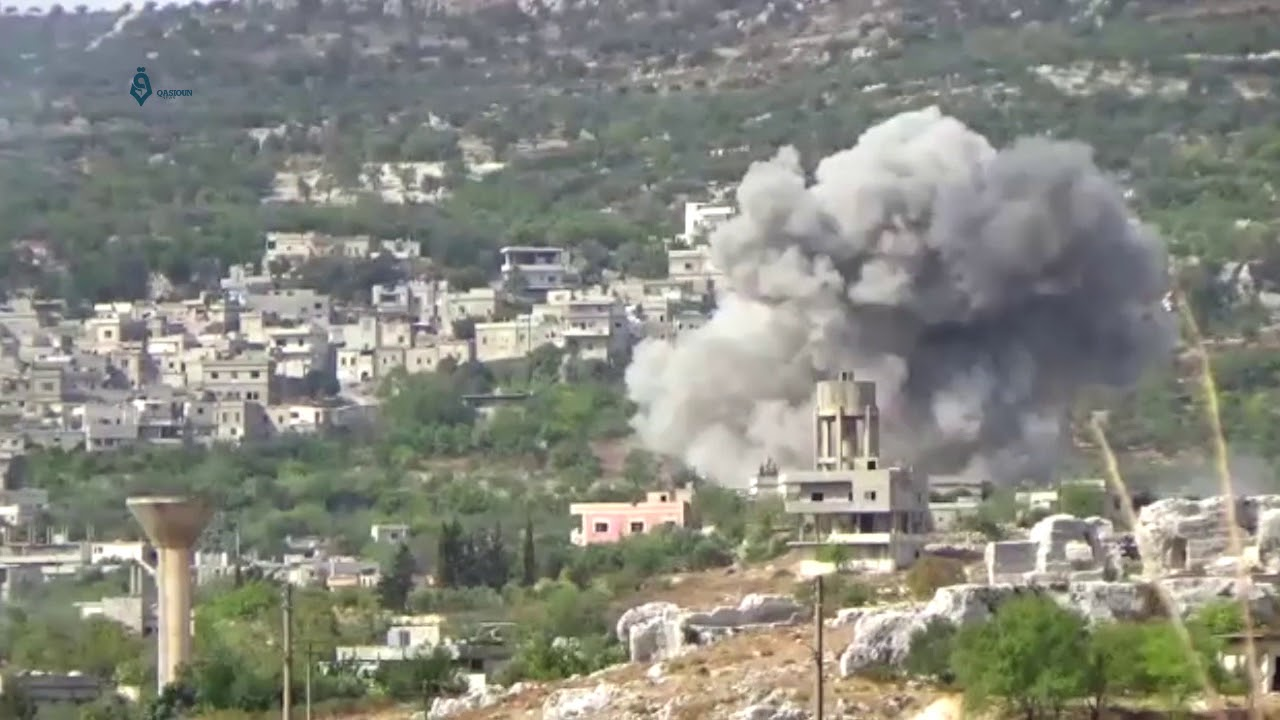
During the offensive, rebel-held towns in the Idlib Governorate, such as Bidama, above, were again hit by Syrian and Russian airstrikes, the first series of airstrikes in the area since the ceasefire attempt from July 2017.

On 23 September, Russian air-strikes targeted rebels in Idlib and Hama governorates, including a Faylaq al-Sham headquarters in the area of Tal Mardiqh in Idlib province, killing more than 50 rebels. There were multiple other Russian airstrikes in Hama and Idlib, including on Khan Sheikhoun, Jisr al-Shaqour, Saraqeb and Kafr Sajna. Around 40 people were reported killed in airstrikes on 24 September.

Concurrently, the Syrian Arab Army launched a counter-offensive in the northern part of the Hama, capturing two villages. However, a strong rebel counter-attack in the evening forced government troops to retreat. The next morning, government forces once again attacked the villages, supported by Russian combat helicopters. On 25 September, the Army made a new attempt to capture the two villages. However, two days later, government forces withdrew from their positions around the villages.

Airstrikes by the government and its allies continued over the following days. On 25 September, Syria Civil Defence claimed that airstrikes resulted in over 40 deaths in Idlib. On 26 September, there were reports of a fifth hospital in rebel territory targeted, the Sham 4 hospital in Kafr Nabl, Idlib. On 27 September, another 43 deaths were reported in towns in Idlib, including Khan Shaykhun and Jisr al-Shughur, as a result of the campaign. On the same day, Russian Defense Ministry's spokesman Major General Igor Konashenkov stated that 5 HTS commanders and 32 militants were killed in a special operation executed by the Russian SOF in coordination with the Russian Air Force which delivered a surgical missile strike on the location of the meeting attended by the HTS field commanders south of Idlib. The commanders were believed to be behind an attack on the group of Russian military police back on 18 September. By 28 September, Syria Civial Defence had reported more than 152 civilian dead in the bombing campaign and that six hospitals had now been targeted, displacing urban residents into rural areas. The bombing campaign was halted on the night of 29 September.

== Aftermath ==
On 6 October, HTS launched an attack northeast of Hama, capturing al-Msherfeh and several other nearby areas. However, the military recaptured most of the territory lost the next day, except al-Msherfeh and Tal Aswad. At least 12 rebels were killed in the fighting, as well as eight government soldiers. On 8 October, the rebels captured Abu Dali and Tal Maqta'a.

On 6 November, Hay'at Tahrir al-Sham alongside Jaysh al-Izza, Jaysh al-Nasr and the Central Division began a large-scale offensive, capturing three villages in the northern countryside of Hama. However, one day later, one village was recaptured by the Syrian Arab Army after a full day of clashes against the rebels. During the morning of 8 November, a second village was recaptured.

== See also ==
- 2016 Hama offensive
- Hama offensive (March–April 2017)
