= 3rd Corps (Syria) =

- الفيلق الثالث
- Syrian Armed Forces Flag
- Active: 1986 - c.2024
- Country: Ba'athist Syria (surrendered)
- Allegiance: Syrian Arab Armed Forces (surrendered)
- Branch: Syrian Arab Army (surrendered)
- Type: Corps
- Size: up to 45,000 soldiers
- Garrison/HQ: Aleppo
- Engagements: Syrian Civil War

Commanders
- Notable commanders: Maj. Gen. Mohammad Khaddour

The 3rd Corps (Arabic: الفيلق الثالث) was a corps of the Syrian Army. It was first formed in 1986. Declassified CIA documents from February 1987 say that the 3rd Corps and 17th and 18th Armoured Divisions were established in 1986. The three corps were formed "to give the Army more flexibility and to improve combat efficiency by decentralising the command structure, absorbing at least some of the lessons learned during the 1982 Lebanon War." The 3rd Corps HQ was in Aleppo, based in the north and covered Hama, the Turkish and Iraqi borders, the Mediterranean coastline and was tasked with protecting the complex of chemical and biological warfare and missile production and launch facilities.

On 30 December 2023, Major General Ahmed Moalla was named as commander of the 3rd Corps.

In 2001 Richard Bennett wrote that the corps consisted of the 2nd Reserve Armoured Division (14th and 15th Armoured Brigades; 19th Mechanized Brigade); a coastal defence brigade; and other units, including four independent infantry brigades, one border guard brigade, one independent armoured regiment, effectively a brigade group, and one special forces regiment. It now appears that the 2nd Reserve Armoured Division may never have existed.

== Structure in 2013 ==
- 3rd Armored Division
  - 47th, 65th and 81st Armoured Brigades
  - 21st Mechanized Brigade
  - 155th Artillery Regiment
- 11th Armoured Division
  - 60th and 67th Armored Brigades
  - 87th Mechanized Brigade
  - 135th Artillery Regiment
- 17th Division (HQ Deir ez-Zor)
  - 137th Mechanized Brigade
  - 93rd Armoured Brigade
- 18th Armoured Division (HQ Aleppo)
  - 131st, 134th and 167th Armoured Brigades
  - 120th Mechanized Brigade
  - 64th Artillery Regiment

== Structure in 2019 ==
- 3rd Armoured Division (Syria)
  - 20th, 65th and 81st Armoured Brigades
  - 21st Mechanized Brigade
  - 155th Missile Brigade
  - 14th and 67th Artillery Regiments
- 8th Armored Division (formed in 2015)
  - 33rd and 47th Armored Brigades
  - 45th Mechanized Brigade
  - 45th Artillery Regiment
- 11th Armored Division
  - 60th and 67th Armored Brigades
  - 87th Mechanized Brigade
  - 89th and 135th Artillery Regiments
- 17th Reserve Division
  - 137th Mechanized Brigade
  - 93rd Armoured Brigade
  - 54th Special Forces Regiment
  - 121st and 123rd Artillery Regiments
- 18th Armored Division
  - 131st, 134th and 167th Armored Brigades
  - 120th Mechanized Brigade
  - 64th Artillery Regiment
- Border Guard Forces
  - 5th Regiment (Hasakah pocket)
  - 6th Regiment (Southern Homs)
  - 8th Regiment (Jordan-Syria border)
  - 10th Regiment (Iraq-Syria border)
  - 11th Regiment (Latakia)
  - 12th Regiment (Manbij and Ayn al-Arab)
  - Unknown Regiment (likely Lebanon-Syria border)
  - 87th Battalion (Talkalakh)

== Notes ==
- Bennett, Richard M. (2001). "The Syrian Military: A Primer". Middle East Intelligence Bulletin. Archived from the original on 29 June 2012. (August/September 2001)
- Cooper, Tom (2015). Syrian Conflagration: The Civil War 2011–2013. Middle East@War Volume 1. Helion & Co. ISBN 978-1-910294-10-9.
