= Border Guard Forces (Syria) =

- قوات حرس الحدود
- Active: 1946 – 2024
- Country: First Syrian Republic (1946–1950); Second Syrian Republic (1950–1958); United Arab Republic (1958–1961); Second Syrian Republic (1961–1963); Ba'athist Syria (1963–2024)
- Allegiance: Syrian Armed Forces (1946–1958); Armed Forces of the United Arab Republic (1958–1961); Syrian Armed Forces (1961–1963); Syrian Arab Armed Forces (1963–2024)
- Branch: Syrian Army
- Type: Brigade
- Role: Border Guard
- Size: 10,000 soldiers (2019)
- Part of: 3rd Corps
- Garrison/HQ: Homs
- Nickname: "Syrian Haganah"
- Motto: Martyrdom is the way to victory (Arabic: الاستشهاد هو الطريق إلى النصر)
- Engagements: Syrian Civil War

Commanders
- Current Commander: Maj. Gen. Ghassan Mahmoud Nasour
- Chief of Staff: Maj. Gen. Muhammad Issa

The Border Guard Forces (Arabic: قوات حرس الحدود) was a gendarmerie force of the Syrian Army responsible for guarding the borders of Syria (mainly in the east of the country) and important strategic facilities. The Syrian Border Guard was in the size of an enlarged unit containing seven regiments which were deployed in different centers in Syria, the brigade was under the command of the 3rd Corps.

== Command structure ==
Border Guard Forces (2021)

- 5th Regiment (Hasakah pocket)
- 6th Regiment (Southern Homs)
- 8th Regiment (Jordan-Syria border)
- 10th Regiment (Iraq-Syria border)
- 11th Regiment (Latakia)
- 12th Regiment (Manbij and Ayn al-Arab)
- Unknown Regiment (likely Lebanon-Syria border)
- 87th Battalion (Talkalakh)

== Combat history ==
The Border Guard Forces began its existence during the French Mandate in Syria under the name "Desert Guard", before 1946. After the independence, its main work was preventing smuggling along the borders, preventing the infiltration of hostile forces, maintaining order in areas far from the centers of government and maintaining important strategic objectives such as Euphrates Dam, oil wells and power plants.

=== Role in the Civil war ===
Over the years, the Syrian Border Guard did not engage in combat as a regular fighting force, but maintained its status as a regional police force. Even during the Civil War in Syria, the Border Guard functioned as a police force mainly in the east of the country.

As of 2019, the Border Guard Force includes seven regiments deployed along the borders of Syria, each regiment is responsible for a sector and its units are stationed throughout the positions and facilities. In their work, border guards use light and medium weapons in addition to armored vehicles to monitor and protect land borders. Since 2019, the Border Guard also incorporated many reconciled civilians or ex-rebels.
