= 8th Armoured Division (Syria) =

- الفرقة الثالثة المدرعة
- Active: 2015–2024
- Country: Ba'athist Syria
- Allegiance: Syrian Armed Forces
- Branch: Syrian Arab Army
- Type: Armoured division
- Role: Armoured warfare
- Size: Up to 10,000 soldiers (2019)
- Part of: 3rd Corps
- Garrison/HQ: Hama
- Engagements: Syrian Civil War; 2015 Idlib offensive; Hama offensive (September 2017); Northwestern Syria campaign (October 2017–February 2018); Northwestern Syria offensive (April–August 2019)

Commanders
- Notable commanders: Maj. Gen. Ibrahim Khalifa; Maj. Gen. Jamal Jounes

The 8th Armoured Division (Arabic: الفرقة الثامنة المدرعة) was a formation of the Syrian Army responsible for securing the northwestern approach to Hama prior to the fall of Ba'athist Syria. 8th Armoured Division was part of the 3rd Corps.

In 2021 the commander of the division was reported as Maj. Gen. Assaf Nisani.

== Command structure ==
8th Armoured Division (2020)

- 33rd Armoured Brigade
- 47th Armoured Brigade
- 45th Mechanized Brigade
- 45th Artillery Regiment

== Combat history ==
Formed in mid-2015 during the rebel's Idlib offensive, the division was designed to unify individual brigades that had either suffered significant losses in south Idlib/north Hama or whose division affiliations had weakened. In 2019, the 8th Division participated in the Operation Dawn of Idlib. By 2020, new brigades were added to unit, such as 47th Brigade. It started as 3rd Division, got moved to 11th Division and then got shifted to the 8th Division. The 33rd Brigade, formerly a part of the 9th Division, also moved to the unit.
