= Ithriyah-Raqqa offensive (June 2016) =

Military operation by the Syrian Army

Coordinates: 35.6445°N 38.4339°E

- Part of the Syrian civil war
Date	2–22 June 2016 (2 weeks and 6 days)
Location	Southwestern Raqqa Governorate, Syria
Result	ISIL victory: The Syrian Army withdraws from all positions it had taken in western Raqqa

Belligerents
(Syria) Syrian Arab Republic: Syrian Armed Forces; National Defense Force; Syrian Social Nationalist Party; Ba'ath Brigades; Galilee Forces; Arab Nationalist Guard; Russia: Russian Air Force	Islamic State of Iraq and the Levant

Commanders and leaders
Major General Hassan Saado † (10th Mechanised Division chief-of-staff)	(Islamic State) Ahmad Kafrouma † (Emir of Al-Tabqa Airbase)

Units involved
Syrian Army: Desert Hawk Brigade; Tiger Forces; Syrian Marines; 4th Armoured Division; 550th Regiment; 555th Regiment; 10th Mechanised Division; National Defence Forces: Golan Regiment; Military Intelligence Directorate: Military Security Shield Forces; Syrian Air Force; Russian Armed Forces: Russian special operations forces	Military of ISIL

Strength
4,800–5,000 soldiers	Unknown

Casualties and losses
39–93 killed	126 killed
- 10 civilians killed

The Ithriyah-Raqqa offensive (June 2016) was a military operation launched in June 2016 by the Syrian Army with the stated goal of recapturing Raqqa, the capital of the Islamic State of Iraq and the Levant. The battle resulted in an Islamic State victory, after a series of counterattacks caused the Syrian Army to withdraw from the positions it had retaken in western Raqqa Governorate.

== Background ==
The offensive took place soon after two US-supported Syrian Democratic Forces offensives were launched. One was in Northern Raqqa with the goal of recapturing the northern Raqqa countryside, in preparation for a future offensive on the city. The second was launched towards the city of Manbij.

== The offensive ==
=== First week ===
On 2 June, Syrian government forces began the offensive at a distance of 120 kilometers from Raqqa. They quickly advanced 20 kilometers and captured the Abu al-Zein mountains and the al-Masbah area, (less than 100 kilometers from Raqqa).

The next day, government troops captured the Zakiyah crossroad on the Hama-Raqqa provincial border, bringing them to within 47 kilometers from the ISIL-controlled Tabqa Air base. Advances were hampered by ISIL's roadside bombs. Between 3 and 4 June, the Syrian Army returned to the Raqqa Governorate for the first time since 2014, and captured the first village inside the province (Abu Allaj), 35–40 kilometers from Tabqa.

The offensive was temporarily halted on 4 June due to a sandstorm, but continued several hours later. During this time, an ISIL counter-attack recaptured Abu Allaj village. The next day, the Syrian Army seized Tal SyriaTel hill, ISIL's last line of defense before the village, and soon after Abu Allaj was recaptured. Later that evening, the Syrian Army seized another village.

By 6 June, the military had advanced to within 24 kilometers of Tabqa Dam and Lake Assad, captured two more villages 30 kilometers from the air base, and was fighting at the al-Rasafeh crossroad and Raqqa international highway's police station. Meanwhile, ISIL launched a counter-attack at Ithriyah, with the SOHR reporting that the jihadists had cut the road between Salamiyah and Ithriyah, while Al-Manar stated the attack had been repelled.

On 7 June, the Syrian military was fighting 25 kilometers south of Tabqa in the al-Rasafeh area.

=== Second week ===
The Syrian Army reached the al-Rasafeh crossroad on June 8, and took control of the area two days later, with government forces being 15–20 kilometers from Tabqa. During the advance the military also seized the nearby oil fields. Throughout the day, tens of Russian and Syrian air-strikes hit ISIL positions at Tabqa.

On 11 June, five ISIL teenage suicide bombers attacked Army positions at the al-Rasafeh crossroad. Four bombers managed to blow themselves up, killing 8–16 soldiers, while the fifth, who was a 13-year-old boy, was captured. Meanwhile, the military was reportedly just several kilometers from the air base and waiting for reinforcements before attacking the base. On 12 June, the Army advanced within six kilometers west of the al-Rasafeh district, south of Raqqa.

Shortly after midnight on 13 June, an ISIL assault, including a suicide truck-bomber, was launched against Abu Allaj. The attack was eventually repelled.

=== Third week ===
After being stalled 15 kilometers from the air base for more than one week, the offensive was restarted on 19 June, and the Army quickly advanced to within seven kilometers of the base. During the advance, they captured the nearby Thawra oil field. However, later that day, an ISIL attack involving three suicide car-bombers pushed back the military and recaptured the oil field. 12 hours later, the next day, the Army launched a new assault towards the Thawrah oil field and managed, once again, to advance to less than seven or eight kilometers from the air base after taking back Thawrah. However, a new ISIL counter-attack later in the day recaptured both the Thawrah and Sfaiyeh oil fields, as well as the al-Rasafeh crossroad, pushing back the Army to the border of Raqqa province, 40 kilometers from the air base. In the evening, ISIL recaptured the village of Khirbat Zeidan, coming within striking distance of the Army’s positions at Albu Allaj.

The Syrian Army withdrew from Albu Allaj and the Rasafeh crossroad on 20 June. In course of the withdrawal, ISIL overran positions of Syrian Army and the government forces suffered heavy casualties, with 29 confirmed killed, 49 wounded and dozens missing-in-action, likely killed or captured. Among those killed was Major General Hassan Saado, who was the chief-of-staff of the 10th Mechanized Division. On 22 June, they withdrew from their final points in western Raqqa including Zakiyah crossroad and SyriaTel Hill, bringing the offensive to an end.

== See also ==
- Ithriyah-Raqqa offensive (February–March 2016)
