= 2014 Simferopol incident =

2014 skirmish in Crimea

Battle of Simferopol
- Part of the Annexation of Crimea by the Russian Federation and the Russo-Ukrainian War
Date	18 March 2014
Location	Simferopol, Crimea, Ukraine 44.975°N 34.143°E
Result	Russian victory: Ukrainian military base captured; First combat deaths of the Annexation of Crimea; Ukrainian military begins withdrawal from Crimean peninsula the next day

Belligerents
Ukraine	Russia (Republic of Crimea (Russia)) Crimea

Commanders and leaders
Col. Andriy Andryushyn; Serhiy Kokurin †	(Russia) Maj. Gen. Alexey Dyumin (SOF commander) (Russia) Col. Alexander Popov (Russia) Col. Igor Strelkov

Units involved
Armed Forces of Ukraine; Ukrainian Navy; 13th photogrammetric center	Russian Armed Forces; Special Operations Forces; Supported by: Registered Cossacks of the Russian Federation; Crimean Self-Defense Forces

Strength
20, including civilians	15 masked operators (SOF commandos); Unknown number of Crimean self-defense forces

Casualties and losses
1 serviceman killed, 2 wounded, 18 captured (later released)	1 killed, (Cossack paramilitary); 3 wounded
- Notes: Cause of deaths disputed

On 18 March 2014, a Ukrainian soldier and a Russian Cossack paramilitary were killed in the first case of bloodshed during the Russo-Ukrainian War and the annexation of Crimea by the Russian Federation.

On 19 March 2014, Russian media and Crimean authorities stated that a 17-year-old Ukrainian had been detained, but on 20 March 2014, the Crimean prosecutor denied that any detentions had taken place.

None of the accounts of this event could be verified independently. The Ukrainian and the Crimean authorities provided conflicting reports of the event. The two casualties had a joint funeral attended by both Crimean and Ukrainian authorities. The event continues to be under investigation by both the Crimean authorities and the Ukrainian military.

== Ukrainian version ==
=== Storming of Ukrainian military facility ===
On March 18, 2014, at 3 p.m., 15 masked gunmen attired in Russian uniforms without insignia stormed the 13th Photogrammetric Center of the Central Military-Topographic and Navigation Administration in Simferopol, Crimea. The Ukrainian-controlled base had been completely surrounded by pro-Russian and Crimean Self-Defense troops since 13 March. Pro-Russian forces demanded that the garrison surrender the base, or otherwise they will take the center with force.

Although it is unclear how the incident initially began, reports emerged of a pro-Russian self-defense member attempting to scale a wall into the base compound and being told to get back by Ukrainian guards. The argument escalated into both sides exchanging live gunfire and storming the base. However, civilian testimonies indicated seeing self-defense troops and militiamen preparing for a possible storming of the base prior to any confrontation.

Soldier Serhiy Kokurin, a Ukrainian junior officer manning a watchtower overseeing a vehicle pool at the base, was fatally injured in the neck during the shoot-out. A second Ukrainian serviceman was shot in the neck and evacuated by several ambulances. The ambulances were granted entrance to the scene by self-defense troops, who sealed off the base to journalists. This death marked the first military fatality in the Russian takeover of Crimea. In addition to the officer, an ethnic Russian volunteer was reported killed per Crimean authorities, though it was unclear if he was killed by resisting Ukrainian troops or by accidental friendly fire (both were reported).

The storming followed with the takeover of the park located within the base's compound and the Ukrainian command center. According to civilians and journalists at the scene, a total of 15 unmarked soldiers, armed with shotguns and AK-47s, participated in the assault, supported by two military vehicles bearing the Russian flag. Self-defense soldiers beat a captured Ukrainian soldier, on patrol at the park, with a pair of iron rods. The soldier's condition was reported as serious, according to military accounts.

Shooting continued until the Ukrainian commander, Colonel Andriy Andryushyn, was captured. He was taken hostage, along with several other soldiers, in order to gain entry into the base's nautical building, where the remaining Ukrainian personnel had barricaded themselves on the second floor, refusing to surrender. The Ukrainian commander was interrogated by Russian troops and allegedly declared his defection to the "People of Crimea" afterwards.

Negotiations over the surrender of the nautical building and the Ukrainian troops inside continued until late Tuesday evening, when talks were met over their surrender. Gunmen arrested a total of 18 remaining Ukrainian soldiers. The soldiers were placed in rows and had all identification marks, weapons, and money confiscated at the behest of Crimean police. By March 24, the remaining Ukrainian troops who had been captured during the altercation were freed, unharmed.

=== Government reactions ===
Ukrainian interim prime minister Arseniy Yatsenyuk accused Russia of a war crime over the incident. "Today, Russian soldiers began shooting at Ukrainian servicemen, and this is a war crime without any expiry under a statute of limitations." Acting Ukrainian president Oleksandr Turchynov suggested that the Russian annexation of Crimea was moving from a political phase to a military phase following the announcement of the death of a serviceman. He issued orders on the night of 18 March, allowing Ukrainian soldiers to use their weapons to defend themselves. The Ukrainian government released a statement declaring that the steps Russia was taking were reminiscent of those taken by Nazi Germany and its annexations of territories before the start of World War 2.

The Treaty on Accession of the Republic of Crimea to Russia was signed on the same day by Vladimir Putin and the self-declared Crimean republic, formally joining the independent Republic of Crimea to the Russian Federation as two federal subjects—the Republic of Crimea and the federal city of Sevastopol.

=== International reactions ===
British Prime Minister David Cameron said, "The steps taken by President Putin today to attempt to annex Crimea to Russia are in flagrant breach of international law and send a chilling message across the continent of Europe. Russia will face more serious consequences, and I will push European leaders to agree further EU measures."

== Russian version ==
=== Alleged "sniper" ===
On March 19, 2014, Russian state media organization Vesti FM, citing the Crimean government and police, reported that authorities had detained an unnamed "sniper" in connection to the killings, a 17-year-old resident of Lviv and member of Right Sector. Sergey Aksyonov, de facto Head of Crimea, confirmed the report on Twitter. Right Sector, a Ukrainian right-wing political party that often appeared in Russian news coverage of Ukraine, had previously stated on February 27 that it did not have any intention to go to Crimea.

The following day, however, Interfax-Ukraine reported that the Crimean prosecutor denied the arrest, its press officer stating, "The information on the shooter's detention has not been confirmed. It is untrue. Unfortunately, no one has been detained yet."

== Igor Girkin participation ==
Igor Girkin, the commander of pro-Russian forces in the War in Donbas in 2014, admitted in his interview he gave on November 20, 2014, he was in charge of the center's assault.

I was in charge of the only unit of Crimean militia, the Spetsnaz company, which carried out combat missions. But after the combat for the cartography base when 2 people died (I was that battle's commander), the company was disbanded and its members parted.

(Russian: Я командовал единственным подразделением крымского ополчения: рота специального назначения, которая выполняла боевые задачи. Но после боя за картографическую часть, когда двое погибло (а я этим боем командовал), рота была расформирована, люди разъезжались.)

— Igor Strelkov, Newspaper "Zavtra", 20 November 2014

== Casualties ==
=== Ukraine ===
- Ensign (Praporshchik) Serhiy Kokurin – killed (shot while on patrol). He received 2 shots from 5.45 mm caliber bullets (one bullet hit the heart).
- Captain Valentyn Fedun – wounded in the neck and arm
- Unidentified Ukrainian soldier – seriously injured in the head after blows from an iron bar

=== Crimean Self-Defense Forces ===
- Ruslan Kazakov (Russian volunteer from Nagolnyy, Volgograd Oblast, Don Cossack militia member, First and Second Chechen wars veteran (SOBR)) – fatality.
- Private Alexander Yukalo (Simferopol Terek Cossack Company) - shot in the thigh.
- Several other unidentified members wounded
