= Serhiy Kokurin =

Ukrainian soldier (1978–2014)

Serhiy Kokurin Сергій Кокурін
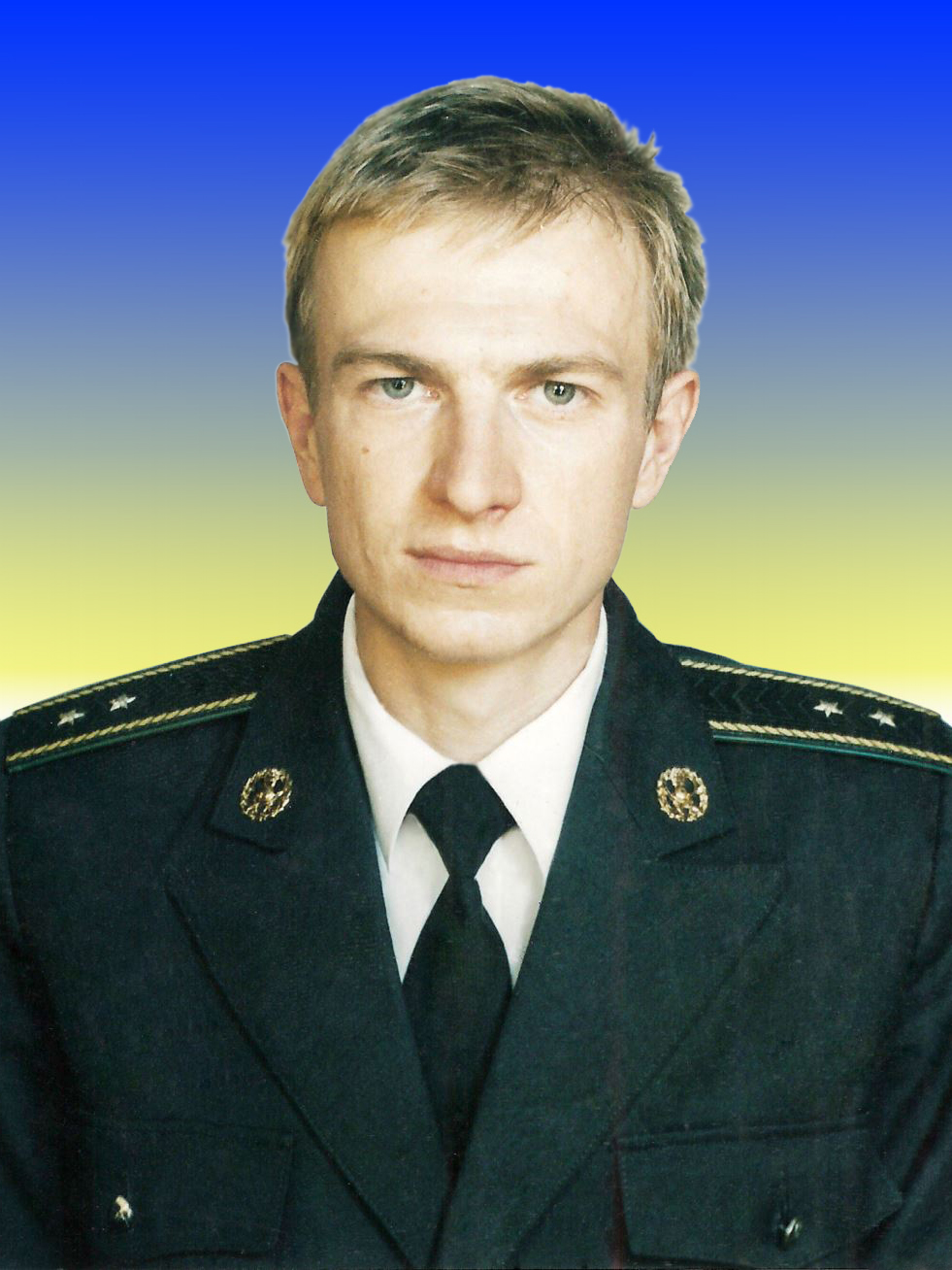
- Born: 1 January 1978; Simferopol, Crimean Oblast, Ukrainian SSR, Soviet Union
- Died: 18 March 2014 (aged 36); Simferopol, Ukraine
- Children: 2
- Military career
- Allegiance: Ukraine
- Branch: Ukrainian Army
- Service years: 1997–2014
- Rank: Praporshchik
- Conflicts: Russo-Ukrainian War; Annexation of Crimea; Simferopol incident †
- Awards: Order For Courage 3rd grade (posthumously)

Serhiy Viktorovych Kokurin (Ukrainian: Сергій Вікторович Кокурін; 1 January 1978 – 18 March 2014) was a Ukrainian soldier who was shot dead during an assault on a Ukrainian military base in Simferopol. He was the first soldier killed during the Russo-Ukrainian War.

== Biography ==
Serhiy Kokurin was born on 1 January 1978 in Simferopol, Crimean Oblast (Ukrainian SSR, USSR). On 28 December 1997 he pledged his allegiance to the Ukrainian people. During his military service Kokurin went from private to warrant officer and was the chief of his unit's logistics service.

On 18 March, Kokurin was killed on watch duty during the Russian assault on the 13th Photogrammetric Center of the Central Military Topographic and Navigation Main Directorate of Operations of the Armed Forces of Ukraine.

Russian press started to distribute fake that Kokurin was killed by a sniper. Ukrainian witnesses disprove this version: attackers broke into Ukrainian military establishment, opened chaotic fire with automatic weapons, and fired at the observation tower. Death report says "Kokurin was killed by two 5.45 mm bullets fired from the bottom up", proving that one of the fighters from Girkin's unit killed Kokurin.

Kokurin was survived by his wife, son, and unborn child, all of whom relocated to Odesa.
