= Special Operations Forces (Russia) =

Russian strategic-level special operations command

- Силы специальных операций Sily spetsial'nykh operatsiy
- Emblem of the Special Operations Forces
- Founded: 2009
- Country: Russia
- Branch: Russian Armed Forces
- Type: Special forces
- Role: Special operations; Direct action; Special reconnaissance; Counter-terrorism
- Part of: Special Operations Forces Command
- Garrison/HQ: Kubinka-2, Moscow region
- Colors: Black
- Anniversaries: 27 February
- Engagements: Counter-piracy operations; Insurgency in the North Caucasus; Russo-Ukrainian War; •Annexation of Crimean Peninsula; •Seizure of Crimean Parliament; •Simferopol Raid; •Russian invasion of Ukraine; Russian military intervention in the Syrian Civil War Campaign battles: Latakia Offensive; First battle of Palmyra; Second Ithriyah-Raqqa offensive; ISIL offensive on Palmyra; Aleppo counteroffensive; Operation Dawn of Victory; Second battle of Palmyra; Eastern Homs offensive; North Hama offensive; Operation Grand Dawn; East Hama offensive; Operation Khuzam; Hama counteroffensive; Battle of Deir ez-Zor; Euphrates Crossing offensive; Mayadin offensive; Operation Fajr-3; Liberation of whole western bank of the Euphrates; Operation Damascus Steel; Eastern Qalamoun offensive; Operation Dawn of Idlib

Commanders
- Current commander: Major General Valery Flyustikov

Insignia
- Flag

The Special Operations Forces of the Armed Forces of the Russian Federation, commonly known as the Special Operations Forces (SOF; Russian: Силы специальных операций, ССО, romanized: Sily spetsial’nykh operatsiy, SSO), are strategic-level special forces under the Special Operations Forces Command of the General Staff of the Armed Forces of the Russian Federation. They are also a structural branch and an independent unit of the Armed Forces.

The first units of what would become the Special Operations Forces were transferred from the General Staff Directorate (GRU) in 2009 as part of the continuing 2008 Russian military reform. Previously, Russian special operations were the purview of the Spetsnaz GRU. The Special Operations Forces Command (Russian: Командование сил специальных операций, KCCO, romanized: Komandovaniye sil spetsial'nykh operatsiy, abbr. KSSO or KSO), established in 2012, was announced in March 2013 by the Chief of the General Staff Valery Gerasimov. According to Gerasimov, Russian authorities designed the SOF as a strategic-level asset: élite special-operations-force units of the KSSO whose primary missions would be foreign interventions including counter-proliferation, foreign internal defense operations and undertaking the most complex special operations and clandestine missions for protecting the interests of the Russian Federation.

The SOF is distinct from the Spetsnaz GRU with their use of soldiers hired on contract. All soldiers of the SOF are personnel who serve on contract; many of them all are full-time servicemen consisting of commissioned officers and regular soldiers.

On 26 February 2015, President Vladimir Putin decreed 27 February as the Day of the SOF, according to multiple Russian official news agencies (albeit not acknowledged formally) to mark the establishment of Russian control over the building of the Supreme Council of the Autonomous Republic of Crimea in Simferopol, Crimea on 28 February 2014.

== Mission and methods ==
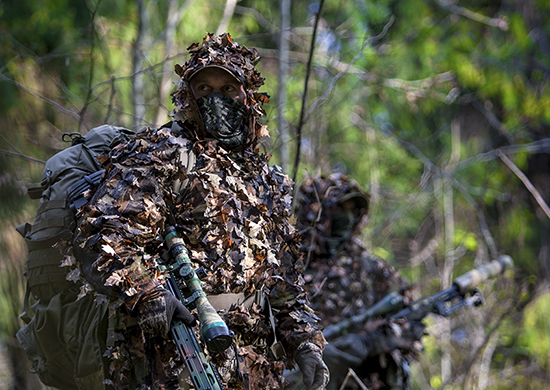
Russian SOF operators.

The Special Operations Forces are a highly mobile, well-trained and equipped, constant combat prepared special operations force of the Russian Ministry of Defense. Designed for performing specific tasks, the SOF have the ability to function both within the country and abroad, in peacetime and in wartime (with application of military force, by necessity).

The Russian Ministry of Defense defines the term "special operation" as "methods and ways of fighting not characteristic of conventional forces: reconnaissance and sabotage, subversion and sedition, counter-terrorism, counter-sabotage, counterintelligence, guerrilla, counter-guerrilla and other activities".

The SOF have been primarily involved in Syria, conducting target acquisition for Russian Air Force combat planes conducting airstrikes and Russian Navy sea-launched cruise missile strikes, serving as military advisors training Syrian government troops, seek and destroying critical enemy objects, disruption behind enemy lines through ambushes, high value targeted assassinations and retaliation strikes against select groups of fighters.

== History ==
=== Within the Russian Federation ===
In 2009, as a part of the comprehensive reform of the Russian Federation's Armed Forces, Special Operations Directorate, subordinate directly to the Chief of the General Staff, was created on the basis of the GRU's 322nd Specialist Training Center in the Moscow region (Military Unit 92154). The unit saw extensive action in the Caucasus region and earned the nickname podsolnukhi (sunflowers), a nickname given to the soldiers assigned to the unit while serving in Chechnya. It was reported that Colonel Oleg Martianov, who later became a member of the board of the Military-Industrial Commission, was one of the founders and first commander of the SOF from 2009 to 2013.

In 2012, the Special Operations Directorate was reorganized as Special Operations Command, which was followed by plans to upscale the Forces manpower up to 9 special purpose brigades.

On 6 March 2013, General Valery Gerasimov announced the creation of the Special Operations Forces. While speaking to foreign military attaches in Moscow, he said: "After reviewing the practice of the formation, training and the use of special operations forces in the leading countries of the world, Russia's Defense Ministry has also begun to create them... A corresponding command was created, which is engaged in planning work and implements a plan of training of the Armed Forces... A set of documents has already been elaborated to determine the direction of development, methods of training and application of these forces".

On 15 March 2013, according to Russian media reports, the creation of the Special Operations Center of the Ministry of Defense for around 500 professional soldiers began in the suburban village of Kubinka-2. The Formation of the center was scheduled to be completed by the end of 2013. The center would be directly subordinate to the Special Operations Forces Command of the Russian Ministry of Defense.

At the end of April 2013, units of the Special Operations Forces conducted a special tactics exercise at Elbrus mountains at an altitude of 4,500 meters. The exercise was dedicated to practice transportation of one of the SOF units by military transport aviation and army aviation, as well as air insertion of personnel and cargo into target the area.

During peacetime, the SOF may also be called in to execute certain specialised homeland security operations. In May 2013, the General Staff said that the unit would be tasked with security of the 2014 Winter Olympic Games in Sochi and that the SOF now comprised air and naval components. Again, when Russia hosted the 2018 FIFA World Cup, the SOF and FSB special forces units took charge of ensuring the security.

The SOF also conducted counter-terrorism and special operations during the insurgency in the North Caucasus region disguised as other Spetsnaz units.

On 2 December 2017, an unnamed mountain with a height of 3,939 meters located on the Sudor ridge in the Irafsky District of the Republic of North Ossetia-Alania, was named "Mountain of Special Operations Forces".

=== Outside the Russian Federation ===
The SOF has also taken part in anti-piracy operations in the Gulf of Aden, clashing with Somali pirates.

In late February 2014, an unknown number of SOF operators alongside other Russian troops entered Crimea disguised as "little green men" and captured the Crimean Parliament and also began the blockading and capturing of other significant and strategic sites across the peninsula.

SOF combat operations in Syria, which began covertly in late 2015 became more visible by January 2016 with the successful Latakia offensive. They played a crucial role in the Palmyra offensive, provided support to the Syrian Army attempting the recapturing of Raqqa, repelling the ISIL offensive on Palmyra and throughout the Syrian push for Aleppo in the same year.

They returned during the Second battle of Palmyra in 2017 and saw action throughout the year in the Eastern Homs offensive, North Hama offensive, Operation Grand Dawn, the East Hama offensive, Operation Khuzam, rescuing a Russian Military Police unit in the Idlib de-escalation zone and the entirety of the Eastern Syria campaign. The SOF also contributed to the success of the Rif Dimashq Governorate campaign in 2018 and Operation Dawn of Idlib in 2019.

On 11 December 2017, SOF units provided top-level security for the unannounced visit of Russian President Vladimir Putin to Syria at Khmeimim Air Base by covering the most dangerous directions from sea, air and land. Vladimir Putin and Defence Minister Sergey Shoygu later personally thanked all the military personnel involved for their exemplary performance of the task.

In February 2022, the SOF was involved in the full-scale invasion of Ukraine, conducting covert operations targeting critical military infrastructure and support systems of Ukraine and reconnaissance missions behind enemy lines.

== Structure and organization ==
While official numbers are classified, among three locations: the Special Purpose Center "Senezh" (military unit 92154) (Russian: Сенеж (в/ч 92154)), which was established in the late 1990s to support of military operations underway in the Chechen Republic, named the Center for the Training of Specialists (Russian: Центр подготовки специалистов) with a sunflower as its emblem until it was renamed the "Senezh" center and is located on the shores of Senezh Lake (Russian: Сенежское) not far from Solnechnogorsk, and the headquarters at the Special Purpose Center "Kubinka-2" (military unit 01355) nicknamed "zazaborye" (Russian: Кубинка-2 (в/ч 01355) по прозвищу Зазаборье), (Note: "Zazaborye" (Russian: Зазаборье) or 'to Zaborye' refers to the location Zaborye which was a Cossack settlement near Moscow that was referred to as the "Moscow Cossacks" and currently is located within Domodedovo, Moscow Oblast.) which is located at Kubinka, Moscow Oblast, and was established on 7 April 2011, and the SOF Center in "Sevastopol" (military unit 00317) (Russian: Центр ССО в Севастополе (в/ч 00317)), which is located in Crimea at Sevastopol and was established in 2014; analysts believe the size is around 2,000 to 2,500 total personnel. The command has supporting elements providing combat support and combat service support functions. There is a dedicated special aviation brigade that directly controls combat aviation assets at Torzhok, and a squadron of Ilyushin Il-76 transport aircraft at the Migalovo airfield near Tver.

The Special Operations Forces Command is similar in role to the U.S. Joint Special Operations Command. The command reached full operational capability later in 2013 and also serves as the central command authority for the entire SOF structure of which is subordinate directly to the General Staff.

=== Training ===
The training of the officer recruit special operators is carried out in the Ryazan Guards Higher Airborne Command School – RVVDKU (department of special and military intelligence and the department of the use of special forces) and the Novosibirsk Higher Military Command School – NVVKU (department of special intelligence and the chair of the special reconnaissance and airborne training). At "Senezh", potential operators learn skydiving, mountaineering, swimming and military diving, and storming buildings and homes, while "Kubinka-2" focuses on maritime operations and reconnaissance and controls several naval special operations detachments.

There is a cold weather/mountaineering training centre at Mount Elbrus codenamed "Terskol", in Kabardino-Balkaria and the 54th Special Reconnaissance Center in Vladikavkaz, North Ossetia–Alania. Several more sensitive centers specialised for training SOF specialists also exist in military secrecy. Depending on the individual tasks the operatives are being prepared for or specialise in, the training varies. The Special Operations Forces warfare training centers and facilities:

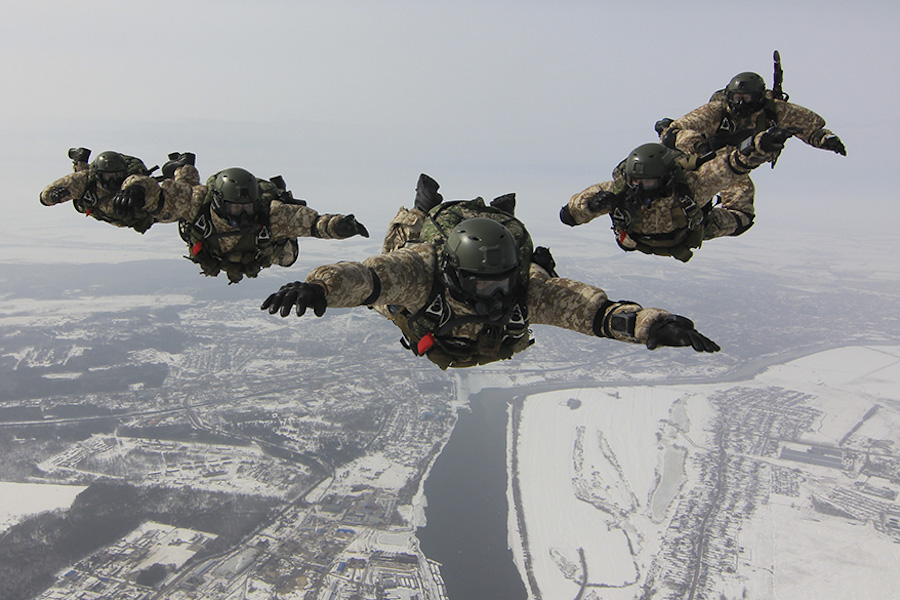
SOF operatives during HALO training.

214th Special Operations Center (V/Ch 01355) "Zazaborye" - Established in 2014 and based in Kubinka, Moscow Oblast

- Sniper Directorate
- Combat Directorate I
  - Airborne Detachment
  - Mountain Warfare Detachment
  - Arctic Warfare Detachment
- Combat Directorate II
  - Airborne Detachment
  - Mountain Warfare Detachment
  - Arctic Warfare Detachment
- Combat Directorate III
  - Airborne Detachment
  - Mountain Warfare Detachment
  - Arctic Warfare Detachment
- Support Directorate
  - Intelligence office
  - Heavy Weapons Unit
  - Motor Pool
  - Agent Networks
  - Logistics Unit

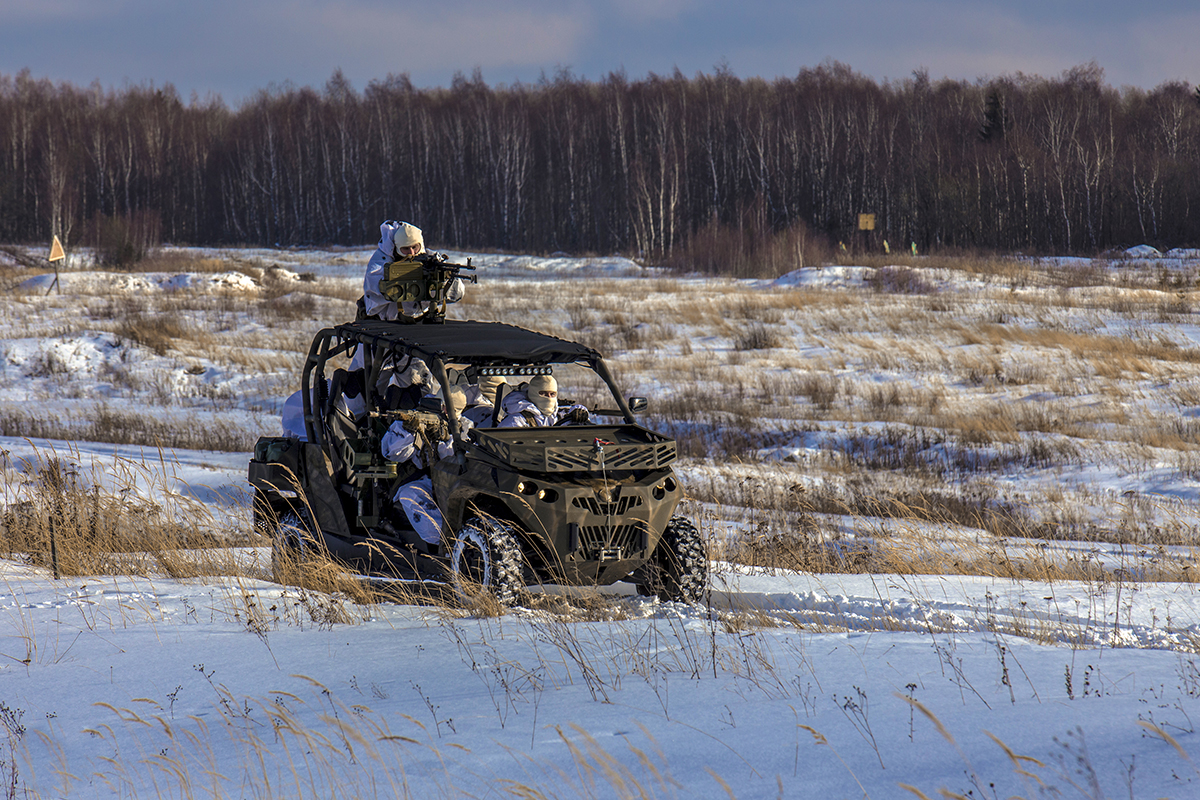
SOF operatives in a winter combat training drill.

322nd Special Operations Center (V/Ch 92154) "Senezh" - based in Solnechnogorsk, Moscow Oblast

- Sniper Directorate
- Combat Directorate I
  - Airborne Detachment
  - Mountain Warfare Detachment
  - Arctic Warfare Detachment
- Combat Directorate II
  - Airborne Detachment
  - Mountain Warfare Detachment
  - Arctic Warfare Detachment
- Combat Directorate III
  - Airborne Detachment
  - Mountain Warfare Detachment
  - Arctic Warfare Detachment
- Support Directorate
  - Intelligence office
  - Heavy Weapons Unit
  - Motor Pool
  - Agent Networks
  - Logistics Unit

561st Naval Emergency Rescue Center (V/Ch 00317) "Sevastopol" - Established in 2015 and based in Sevastopol. Built around Black Sea fleet diving unit, later taking over and consolidating naval departments of Senezh and Zazaborye.

- Sniper Directorate
- Combat Directorate I
  - Airborne Detachment
  - Mountain Warfare Detachment
  - Maritime Warfare Detachment
- Combat Directorate II
  - Airborne Detachment
  - Mountain Warfare Detachment
  - Maritime Warfare Detachment
- Combat Directorate III
  - Airborne Detachment
  - Mountain Warfare Detachment
  - Maritime Warfare Detachment
- Support Directorate
  - Intelligence office
  - Heavy Weapons Unit
  - Motor Pool
  - Agent Networks
  - Logistics Unit

Protection Center "Dolphins" - Bodyguard unit. Took over protection duties from other Centers. Specialist Training Center Solnechnogorsk, Moscow Oblast
Mountain & Survival Training Center "Terskol"
54th Special Reconnaissance Training Center "Daryal"

== Known operations ==
- In 2014, unidentified armed men began blockading Ukrainian bases in Crimea, and on 27 February, they seized the Crimean parliament. While claiming to be a local militia, this well-armed and highly professional unit turned out to be the first deployment of Russia's special operators. On 18 March, undercover operatives captured another military base in Simferopol. According to Russian sources, SOF commander Major General Alexey Dyumin, personally conducted operations in Crimea. Colonel Alexander Popov served as a detachment commander of the SOF and was directly involved in the events for which he was awarded the honorary title of Hero of the Russian Federation.
- SOF have been tasked in recovering the flight recorder of Russia's downed Su-24M back in November 2015, on the same day rescuing the surviving crew of one of the two Mi-8AMTsh helicopters downed by Syrian Turkmen Brigade militants in a CSAR operation which had been searching for the crew of the Su-24.
- During the Battle of Palmyra in March 2016, Senior Lieutenant Alexander Prokhorenko was killed after he ordered an airstrike on his location after being surrounded by ISIL fighters and out of ammunition. He was posthumously awarded the honorary title of Hero of the Russian Federation for the heroic feat.
- On 10 May 2017, Russian President Vladimir Putin personally awarded medals to four officers of the SOF for showing extraordinary courage combating terrorists in Syria. They were part of a 16-man special forces detachment unit which managed to successfully repulse attacks conducted by over 300 jihadists without any losses. The commander of the unit, Lieutenant Colonel Danila was awarded the honorary title of Hero of the Russian Federation.
- On 16 August 2017, a 4-5 man SOF unit was ambushed by 40 Islamic State terrorists in the town of Akerbat and being abandoned by Syrian soldiers. After all the other members of his unit were injured, including the commander and the second officer, Lance corporal Denis Portnyagin took upon the whole job himself and killed 14 terrorists in the process and was even ready to blow his grenades to prevent their capture. He was awarded the honorary title of Hero of the Russian Federation for this feat.
- On 20 September 2017, the Russian General Staff said jihadist militants tried to capture a 29-man unit of the Russian military police two days before, whom were monitoring the ceasefire in a de-escalation zone in Idlib. The trapped unit fought for several hours and were eventually rescued in a special operation by a joint task force which comprised the Syrian and Russian Air Force alongside the SOF. Three SOF operators were injured. All 29 men withdrew safely without any fatalities. Hundreds of jihadists were killed in retaliatory airstrikes by 21 September.
- On 26 September 2017, the Russian Defense Ministry announced Russia had conducted massive cruise missile strikes in Deir ez-Zor and Idlib destroying significant ISIS and Al-Nusra Front targets. On 27 September 2017, 5 Al-Nusra field commanders were killed in an airstrike alongside 32 militants in Idlib province. Another airstrike on 3 October 2017, killed 12 Al-Nusra field commanders including Ahmad al-Ghizai, Al-Nusra's security service chief and at least 50 militants in an undisclosed location in Syria. The Defense Ministry cited the use of "special measures" in those targeted strikes on militant positions, indicating the involvement of Russian special forces in the operations.
- On 12 January 2018, the Russian Defense Ministry announced that the group of militants responsible for a massive mortar attack targeting the Khmeimim Air Base in Syria on 31 December 2017 which killed two Russian soldiers were liquidated in the course of a special operation. SOF operators tracked the militants to their base camp near the border of Idlib and destroyed the entire group with a Krasnopol projectile as they were boarding a minibus to leave the base. No mentions were made of which group the militants were affiliated to. Separately, a depot storing militant drones located in Idlib province was destroyed as well.
- On 25 March 2019, the Russian Defense Ministry said that a group of more than 30 terrorists were eliminated in a special operation by the SOF and the Russian Air Force after they were identified. The operation was a retaliation for the terrorist attack in late February 2019 which killed 2 Russian servicemen. The location and affiliation of the terrorists were undisclosed.
- During Operation Dawn of Idlib, SOF were suspected to be responsible for multiple successful raids behind enemy lines especially in Idlib province killing scores of rebel fighters including two prominent commanders from Ahrar al-Sham and Jaysh al-Nasr. Others killed were from Suqour Al-Sham, Hurras Al-Din and other various rebel factions.
- On 25 August 2020, the Russian Defense Ministry said the Russian and Syrian aviation with the support of artillery and the SOF carried out a joint operation which killed 327 militants and destroyed 134 shelters, 17 observation posts, 7 ammunition warehouses and 5 underground storage facilities of ISIS from 18 to 24 August across the Syrian Desert. The operation was in response to an IED explosion which killed Major General Vyacheslav Gladkikh and wounded 3 Russian soldiers near Deir ez-Zor back on 18 August.

=== Casualties ===
According to the Russian Defence Ministry as of February 2019, there are ten cases among SOF personnel in Syria that have been confirmed to be killed in action. Four members whose status are presumed to have been killed still remains unclear as of September 2019.

=== Hero of the Russian Federation recipients ===
- Col. Alexander Popov
- Col. Vadim Baykulov
- Col. Maxim Sinyavsky
- Lt. Col. Danila Emelyanov
- Lt. Col. Boris Mikheev †
- Maj. Alexey Goynyak †
- LCpl. Denis Portnyagin

== Commanders ==
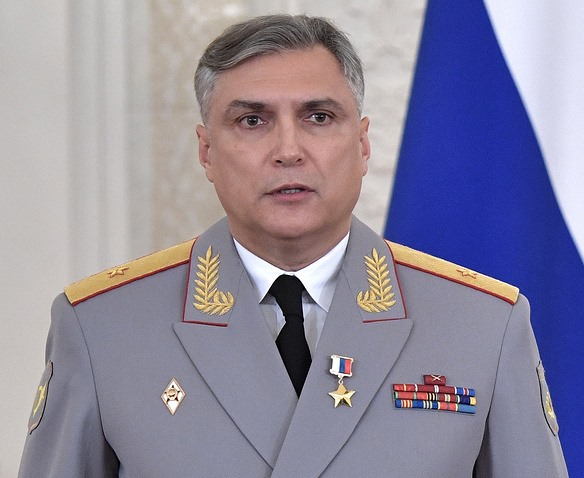
Under the leadership of Maj. Gen. Matovnikov, SOF were critical in Syria.

List of Special Operations Forces commanders
Commander	Start of Term	End of Term
Col. Oleg Martyanov	2009	2013
Maj. Gen. Alexey Dyumin	2014	2015
Maj. Gen. Aleksandr Matovnikov	2015	2018
Maj. Gen. Valery Flyustikov	2018	Incumbent

== Weapons ==
=== Handguns ===
- APS
- PYa
- Glock 17
- Glock 19
- SPP-1 underwater pistol
- PB
- PSS silent pistol
- PSM pistol
- Makarov

=== Submachine guns ===
- Vityaz
- MP5

=== Assault rifles ===
- AS Val
- AK-74M
- AN-94
- AK-105
- AK-103
- AK-104
- AK-205
- AKS-74U
- AK-12
- V-AR

=== Sniper rifles ===
- VSS Vintorez
- Orsis T-5000
- SV-98
- Dragunov SVD
- OSV-96
- ASVK-M Kord-M
- Steyr SSG 08
- Steyr SSG 04

=== Machine guns ===
- PKM
- Pecheneg
- RPK-16
- NSV

=== Explosive weapons ===
- GP-34
- GM-94
- RShG-2
- RPG-26
- RPG-27
- RPO PDM-A
- 9K111 "Fagot"
- 9M133 "Kornet"
- MON-50
- RGO
- RGN

== Equipment ==
=== Apparel ===
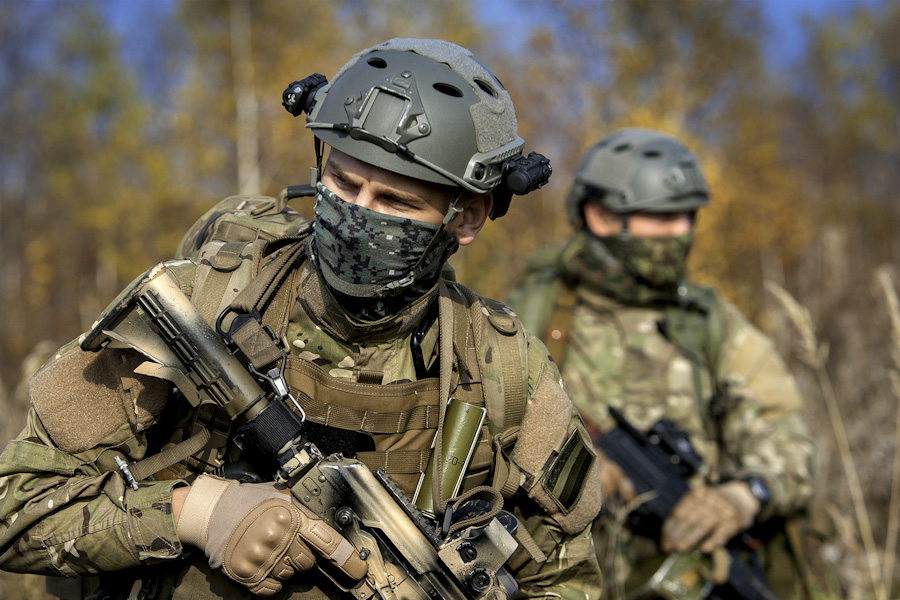
SSO operators wearing Multicam.

- Arcteryx LEAF (Law Enforcement and Armed Forces) kit
- Special Operations Forces kit for extremely hot climates
- Propper Multicam BDU
- 5.45 Design uniforms
- SOKL Leafsuits
- Tactical Performance ATACS FG Tactical Field Jacket/Tactical Combat Pants
- Tactical Performance ATACS FG Battle Strike Uniform Coat/Trousers
- Tactical Performance Multicam Tactical Field Jacket/Tactical Combat Pants
- Tactical Performance Multicam Battle Strike Uniform Coat/Trousers
- Tactical Performance Multicam Tactical Combat Shirt/Pants
- EmersonGear AOR-1 G3 clone
- Massif Combat Shirt
- Phantom special thermal underwear
- Ratnik VKBO EMR camouflage combat uniforms
- Arctic raid suit "Nanuk," other special equipment for low temperatures
- UF PRO Striker X /XT.

=== Helmets ===
- 6B7-1M
- Voin-Kiver RSP
- LSHZ 1+
- Tor-S/L
- 6B47
- 5.45 Design Spartan 1
- 5.45 Design Spartan 2
- 5.45 Design Spartan 3

=== Vests ===
- 6Sh112 LBV
- 6Sh117 LBV
- 6B43 armor vest
- 6B45
- 6B46
- "Redut-M" armor vest
- STICH PROFI® Loading system plate carrier
- STICH PROFI® Lightweight plate carrier
- FORT Defender 2
- 5.11 Tactec Plate Carrier
- ARS ARMA Tactec Plate Carrier
- ARS ARMA A-18 Skanda Plate Carrier
- ARS ARMA CPC Mod 1, 2, 3 Plate Carrier
- ARS ARMA AVS Plate Carrier
- Raidgear & MBC "Phantom" universal Plate Carrier
- Raidgear & MBC MBS Vest Type 2 and 3 Molle Minus universal body armor
- Various Crye Precision, Survival corps, SSO/SPOSN, GearCraft, WarTech, FORT, ANA Tactical, ARS ARMA, Armocom, Ratnik Tactical plate carriers
- FORT Gladiator-A Plate Carrier

=== Other ===
- FORT OVR-3SH Combat Engineering/Demining Kit
- FORT Fortres K14 protective suit
- FORT Raid-L protective suit
- PMK gas mask
- GKN-7 diving suit
- Aqualung Amphora rebreather
- Veer-6 ballistic shield
- PT-2 thermal monocular
- Peltor Com Tac XP headset
- NRS-2 special scout knife
- ZALA UAVs
- Strelets reconnaissance, control and communications system
- Arbalet parachute system

== Transport vehicles ==
=== Ground vehicles ===
- Yamaha Grizzly 700 ATV
- Iveco LMV "Rys"
- GAZ-2330 "Tigr"
- Toyota Hilux
- Land Rover Defender 110
- UAZ-469
- Chevrolet Niva

=== Aircraft ===
- Mi-8MTV-5 transport helicopter
- Mi-8AMTSh armed assault helicopter
- An-26 transport aircraft

=== Watercraft ===
- BRP SEA-DOO GTX LTD PWC
- BRP SEA-DOO RTX-215 PWC
- RBS BlackShadow DPVs (Diver Propulsion Vehicles)

== Gallery ==
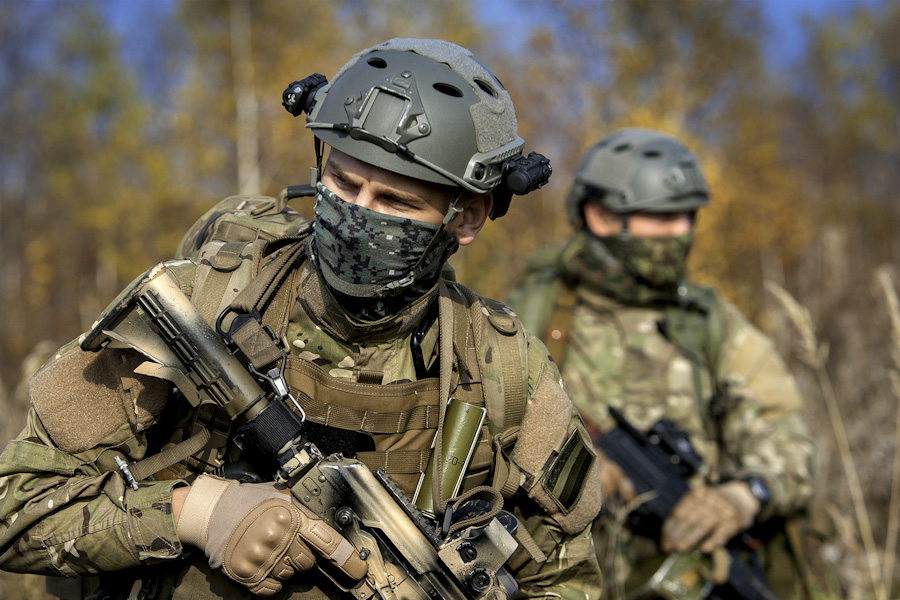

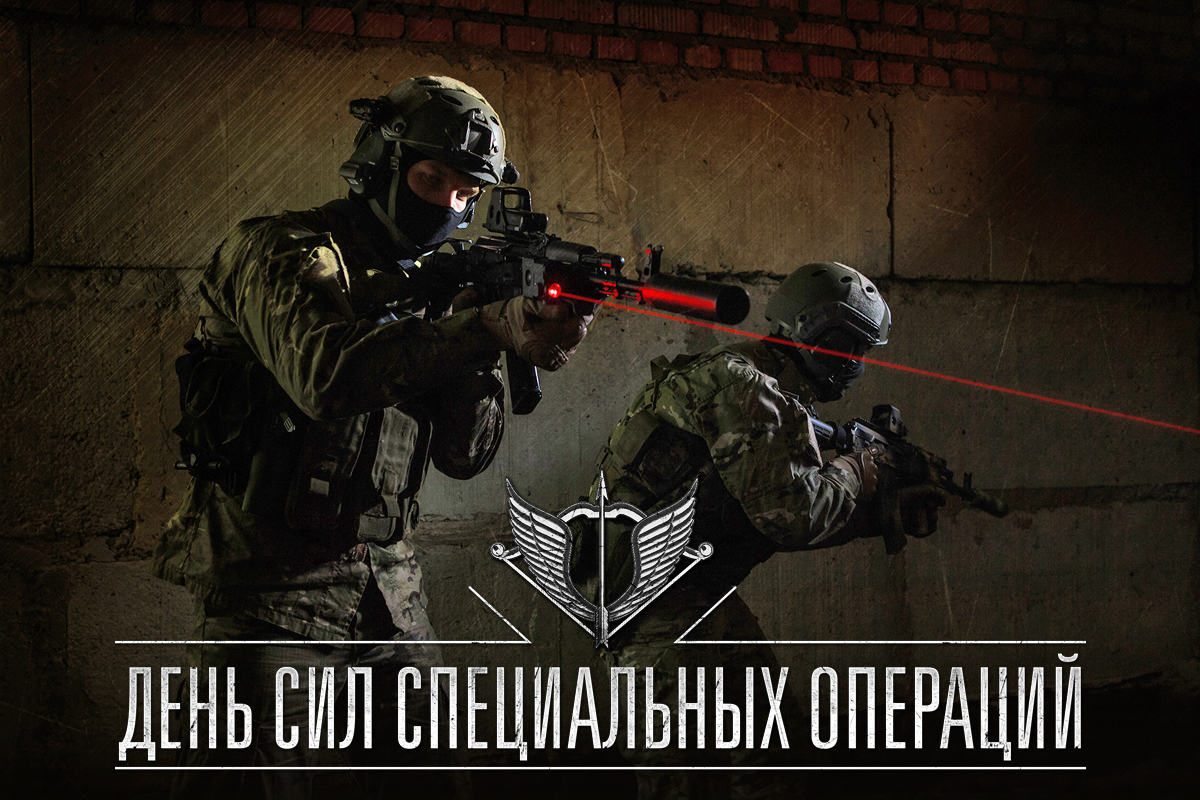

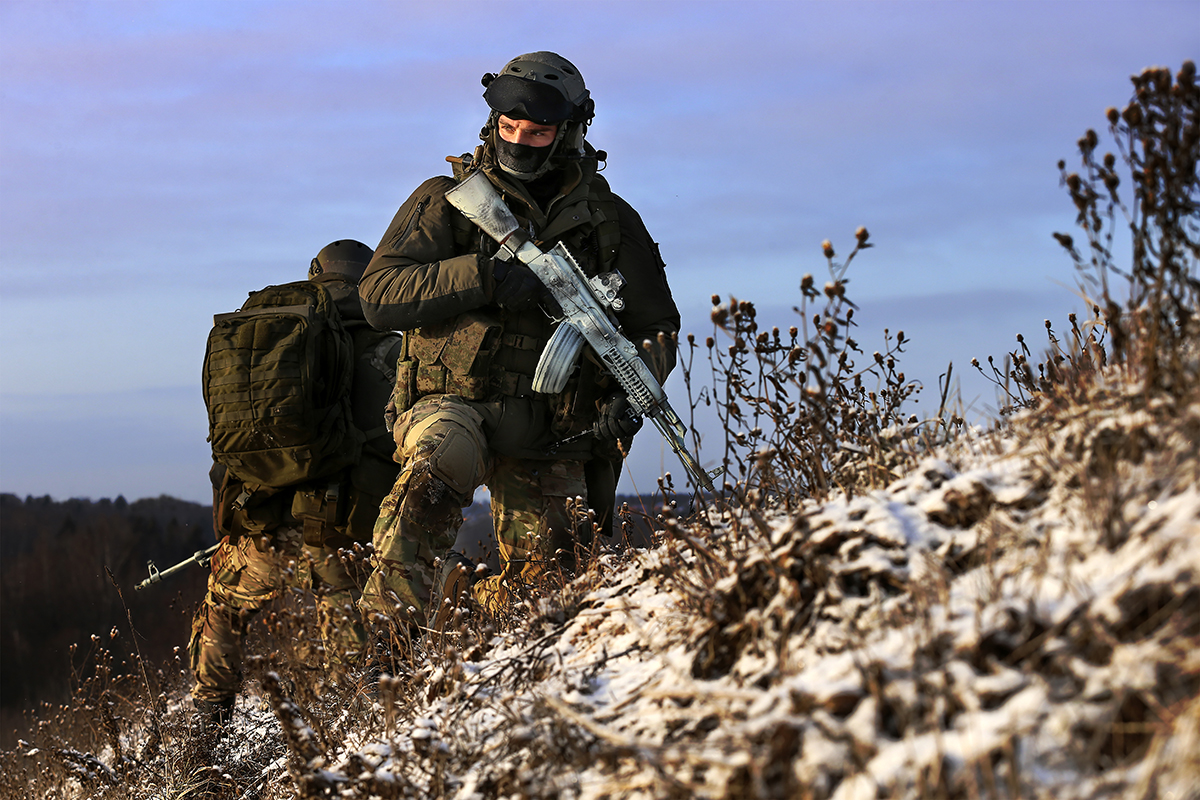

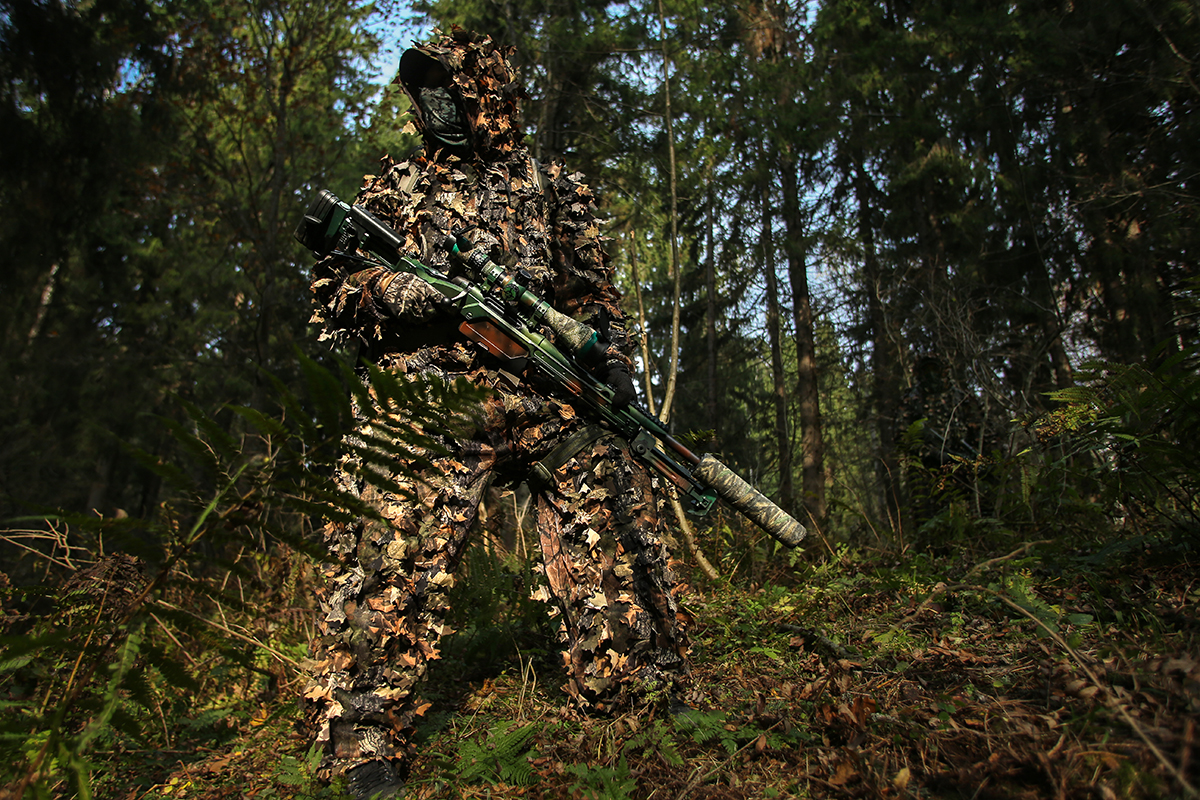

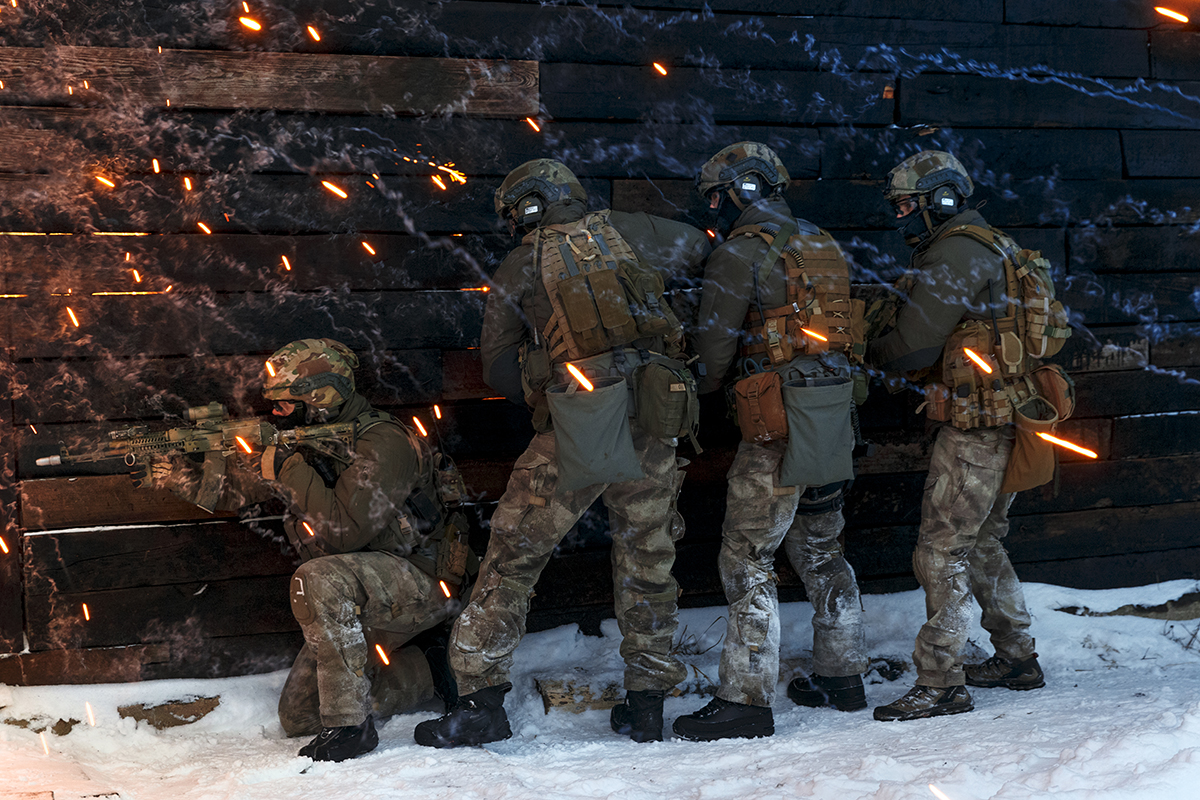

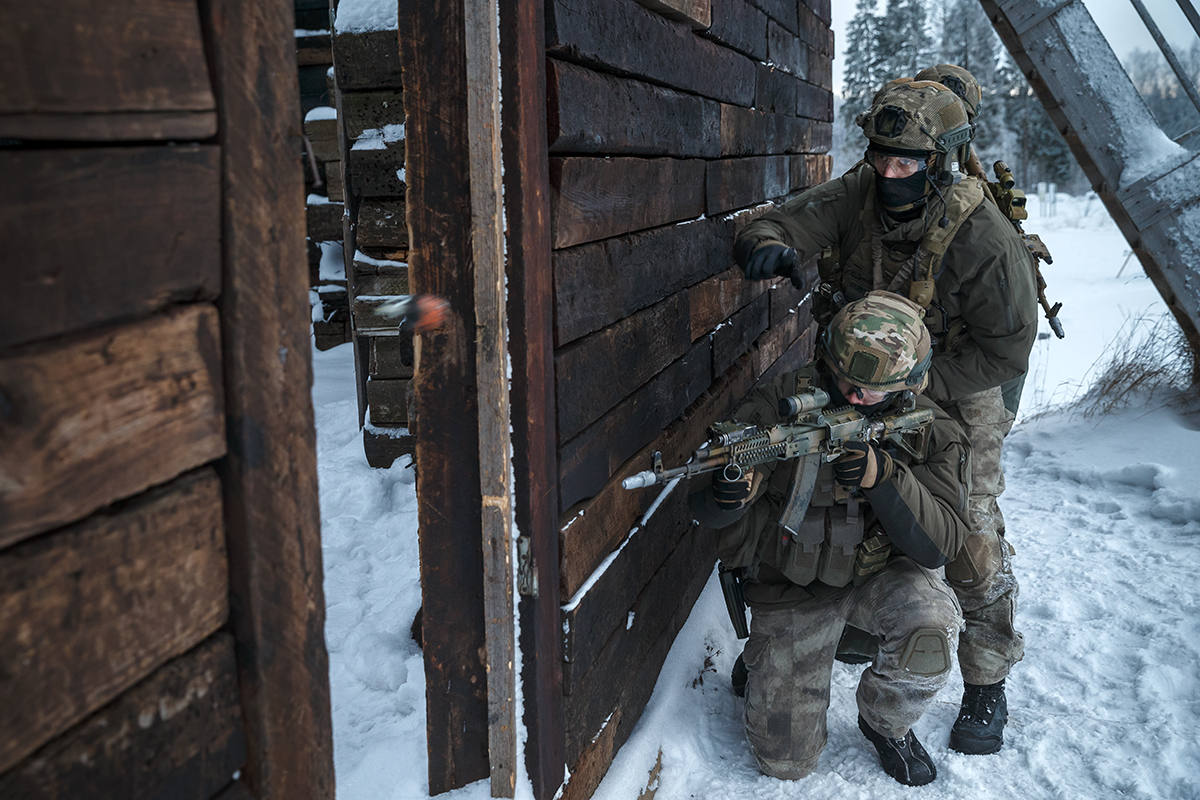

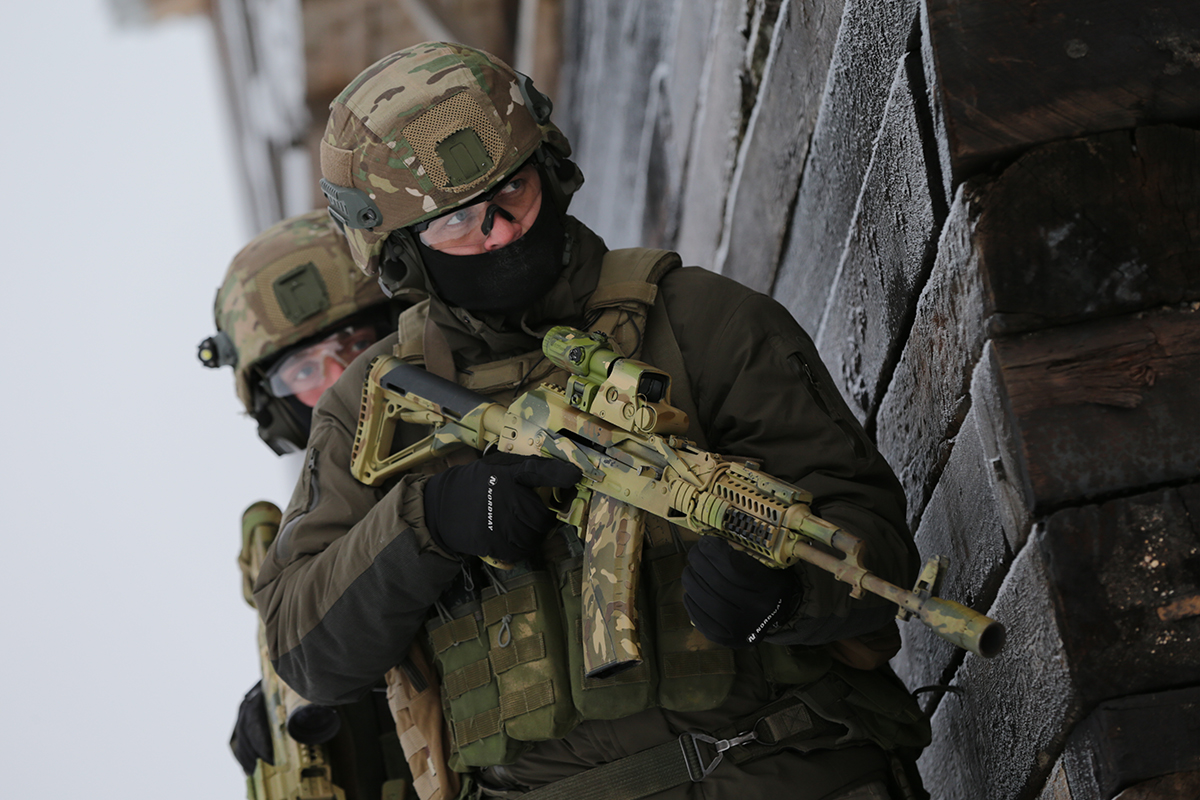

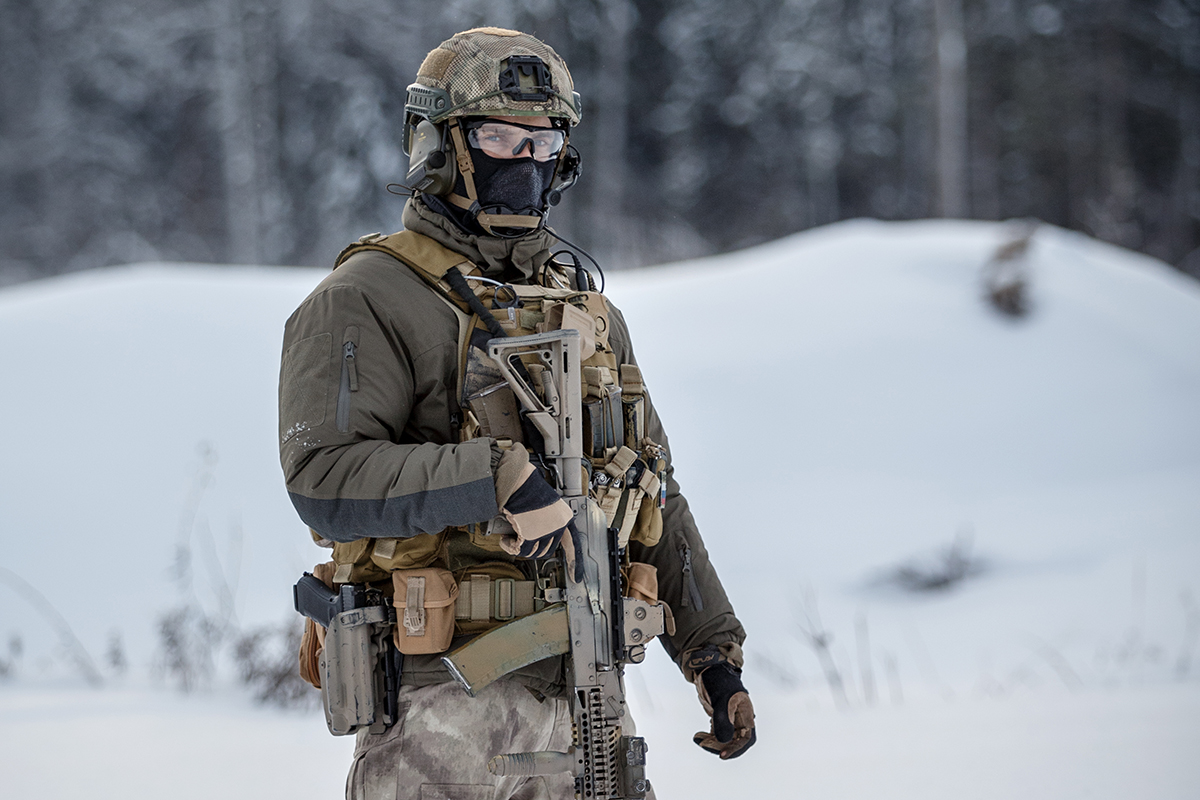

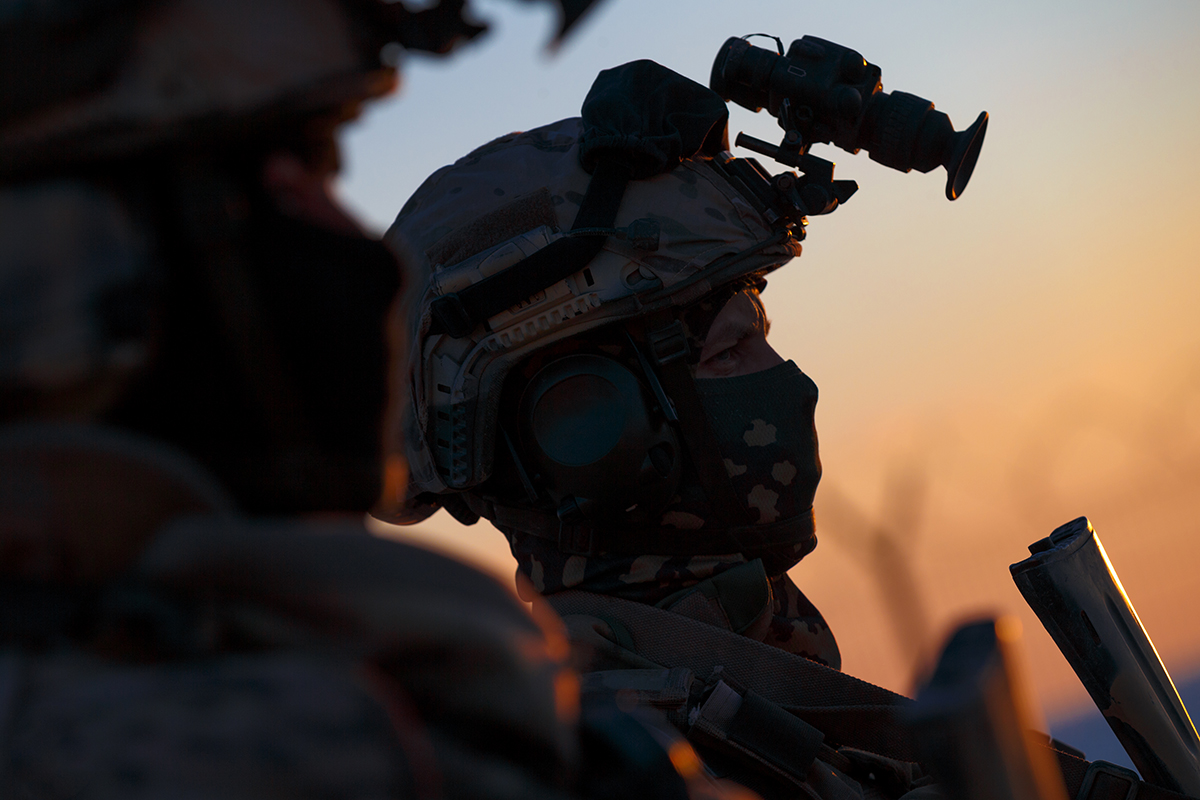

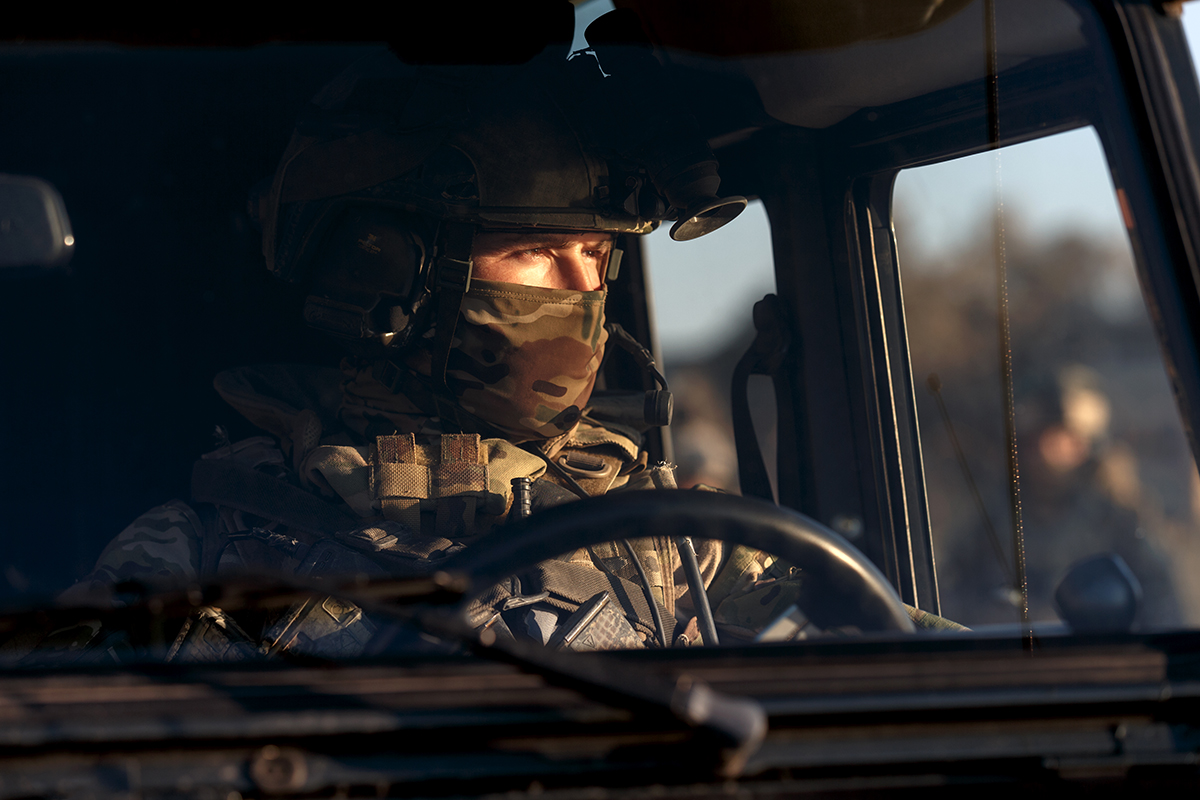

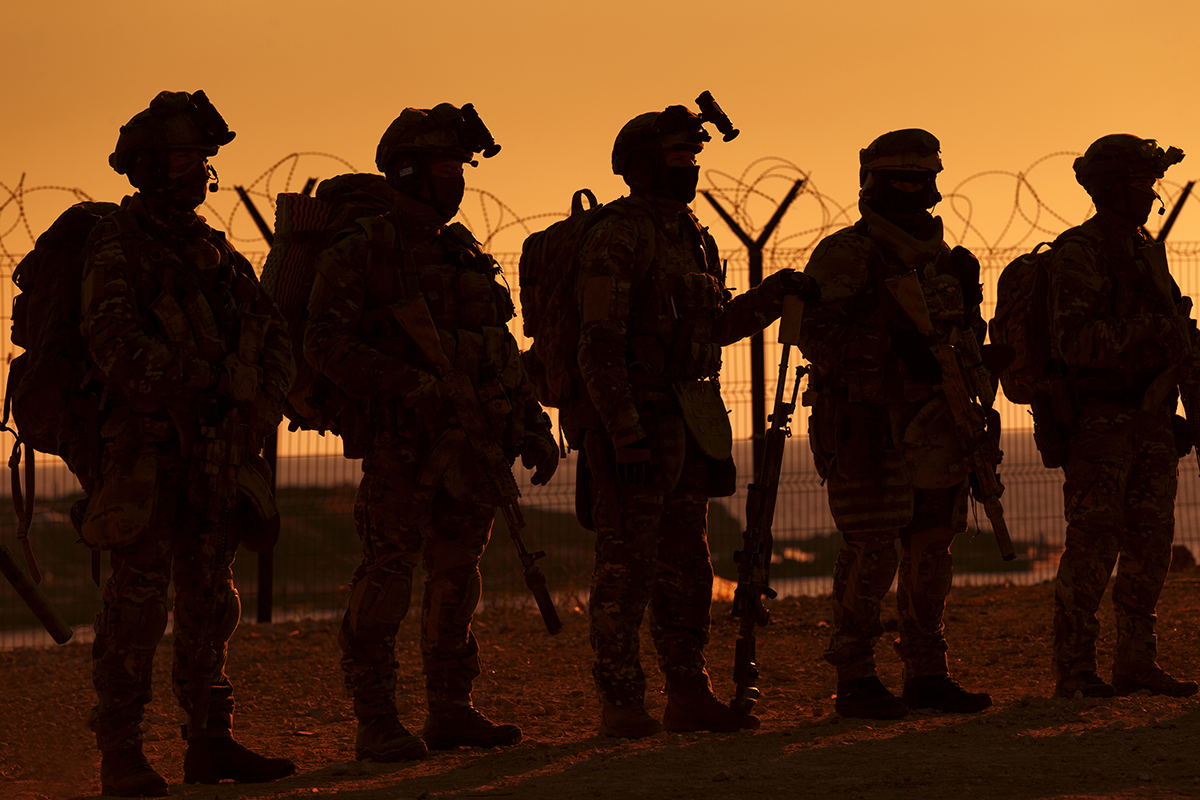

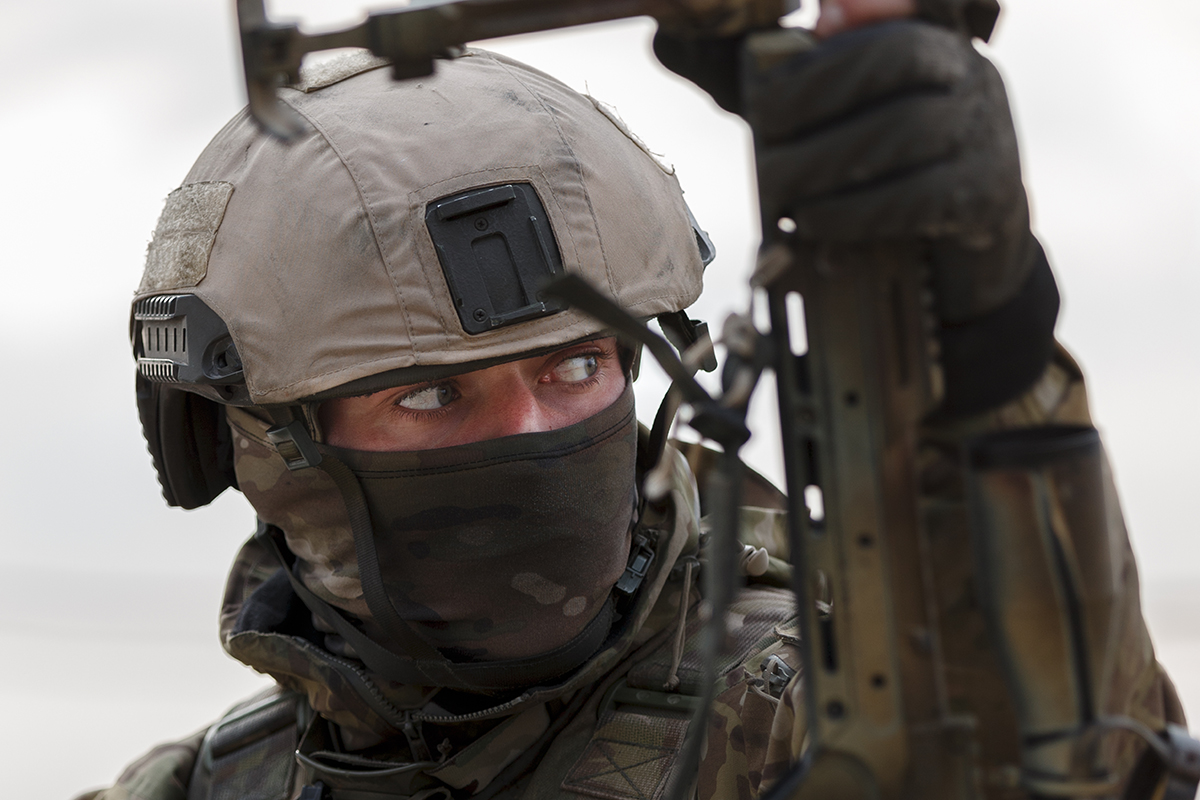

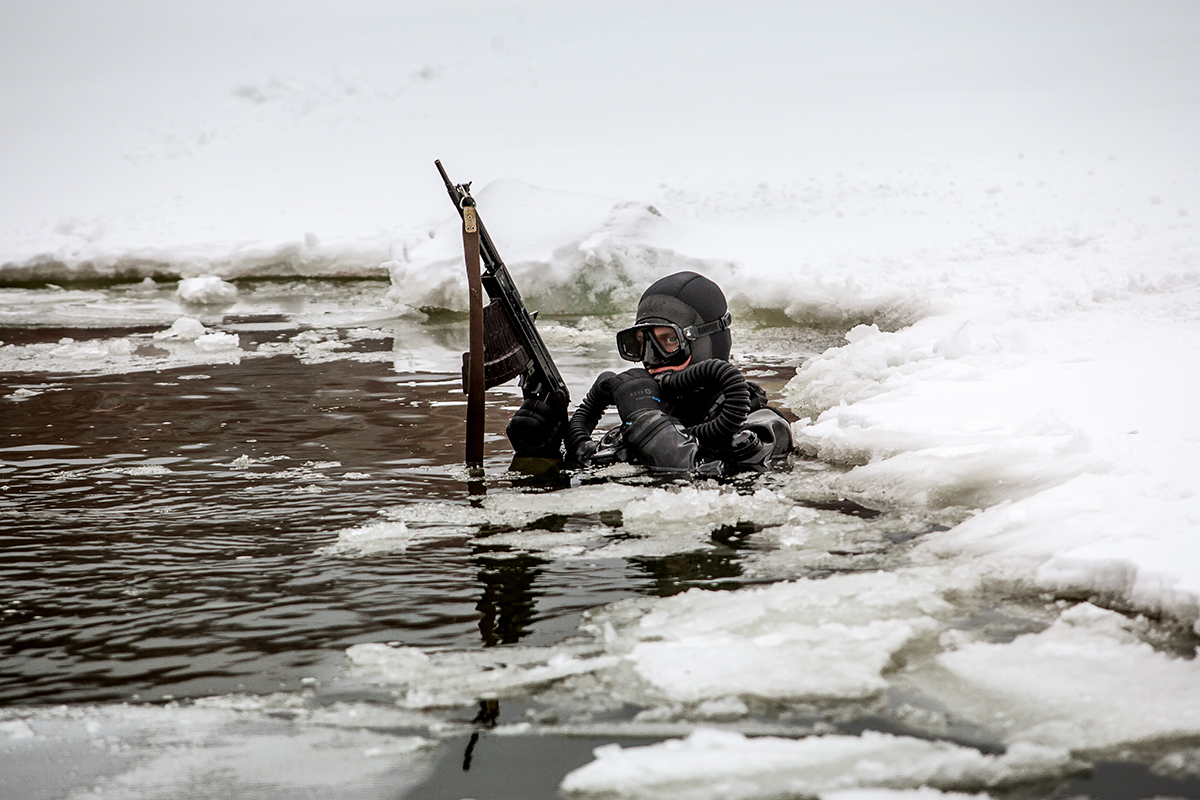

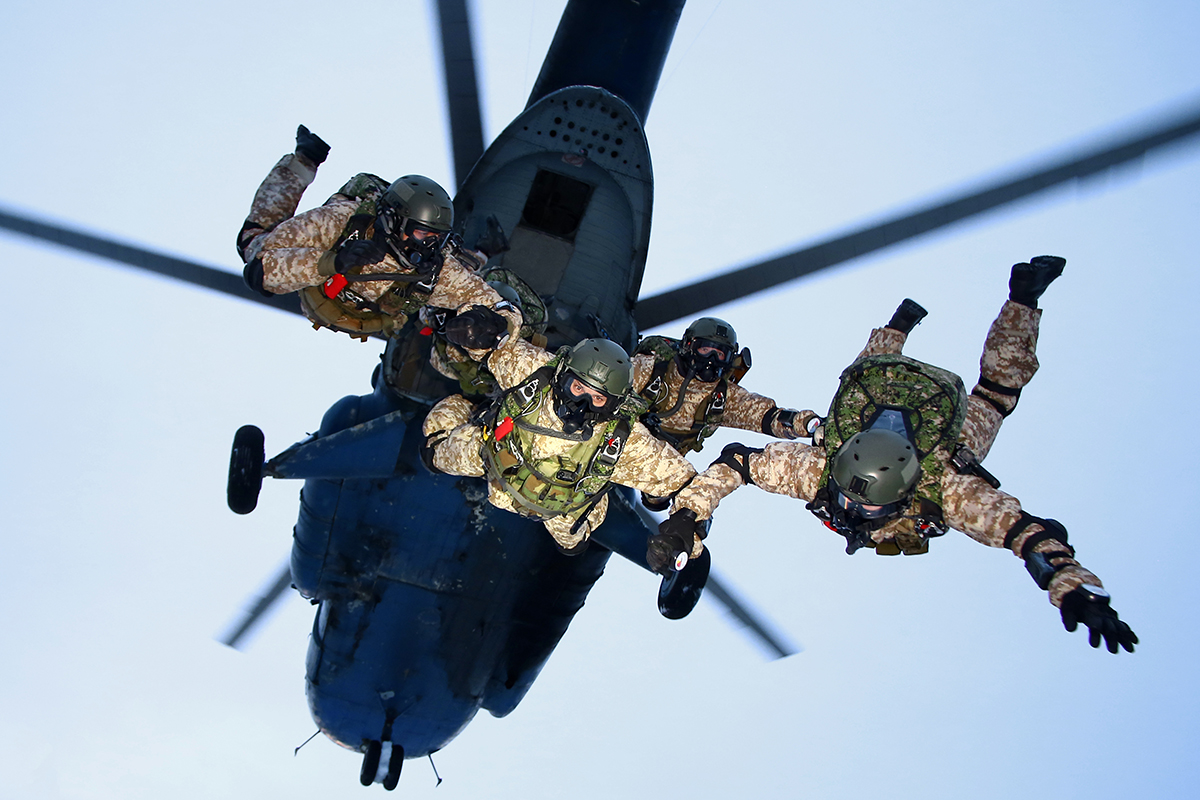

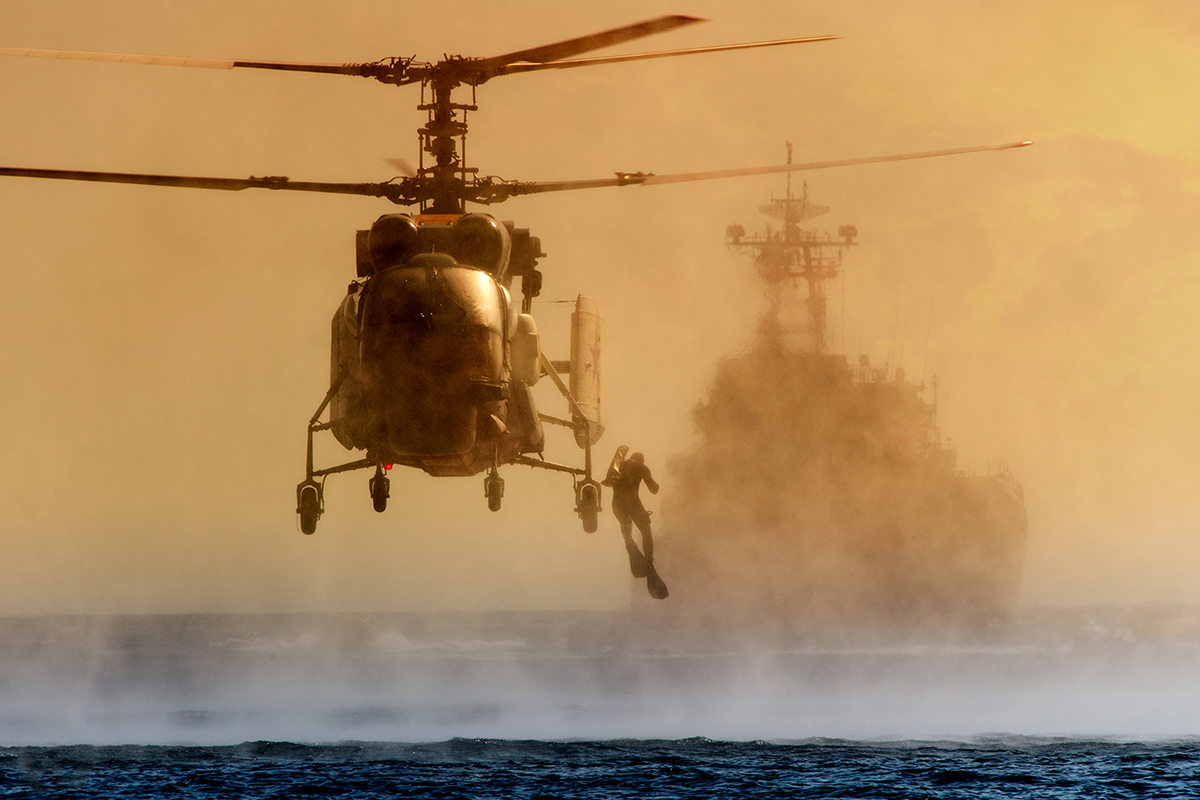

== See also ==
- Spetsnaz GRU of the General Staff of the Russian Armed Forces
- Foreign Intelligence Service's Zaslon
- Joint Special Operations Command (JSOC) – U.S. equivalent command
