= Masasneh =

Masasneh مصاصنة Khirbet Masasneh
- Village
- Location in Syria
- Coordinates: 35°17′26″N 36°39′50″E
- Country: Syria
- Governorate: Hama
- District: Hama
- Subdistrict: Suran

Population (2004)
  - Total: 392
- Time zone: UTC+3 (AST)
- City Qrya Pcode: C3036

Masasneh (Arabic: مصاصنة) is a Syrian village located in the Suran Subdistrict in Hama District. According to the Syria Central Bureau of Statistics (CBS), Masasneh had a population of 392 in the 2004 census.
