= Ithriya =

Ithriya أثريا
- Village
- Location in Syria
- Coordinates: 35.3692°N 37.7859°E
- Country: Syria
- Governorate: Hama
- District: Salamiyah District
- Subdistrict: Al-Saan Nahiyah

Population (2004)
  - Total: 2,118
- Time zone: UTC+3 (AST)
- City Qrya Pcode: C3273

Ithriya (Arabic: أثريا), Roman "Seriana". is a Syrian village located in Al-Saan Nahiyah in Salamiyah District, Hama. According to the Syria Central Bureau of Statistics (CBS), Ithriya had a population of 2118 in the 2004 census.

== History ==
In Roman times in Near Antiquity, Seriana housed a temple, known as the Church of Seriana.

During the Syrian Civil War, Ithriyah became a strategically important point. It lays on the last highway under government control connecting the city of Aleppo to Khanasir and the Salamiyah region. In the Ithriyah-Raqqa offensive (February–March 2016) and Ithriyah-Raqqa offensive (June 2016), the town was used as a launching point for offensives against IS.

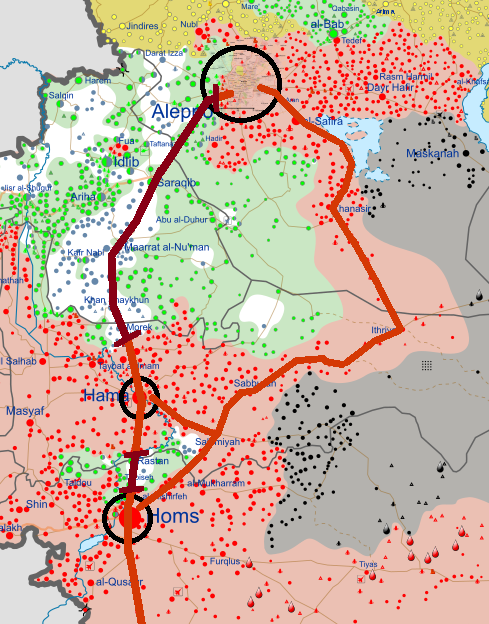
Situation of land access in Northern Central Syria during Syrian civil war in early 2017.

On 15 December 2022, ISIS forces ambushed a convoy of the Syrian NDF militia near the village. The ambush began following the detonation of a landmine under the militiamen's car, killing 3 NDF fighters immediately. Brief clashes took place between ISIS forces and the militiamen, another 2 NDF fighters were killed in the clashes.

As of 5 February 2025 the village was uninhabited.
