= Forces of the Fighters of the Tribes =

Pro Syrian Baath Tribal Militia

- Arabic: قوات مقاتلي العشائر, romanized: Quwat Muqatili al-Asha'ir
- Emblem of the militia. Top reads: "Syrian Arab Republic. The Army and the Armed Forces- Intelligence Branch." Bottom: "Lions of the Jazeera. Forces of the Fighters of the Tribes."
- Leaders: Turki al Buhamad; Ahmad al Buhamad
- Dates active: c. 2013/14 – ?
- Groups: Deir ez-Zor branch; Homs branch; Bayraq al-Suwayda (formerly)
- Active regions: Syria
- Size: 5,000 (self-claim 2017)
- Part of: Military Intelligence Directorate (until 2024)
- Wars: the Syrian Civil War

The Forces of the Fighters of the Tribes (Arabic: قوات مقاتلي العشائر, romanized: Quwwāt Muqātilī l-ʿAšāʾir), also known as the Tribal Army (Arabic: جيش العشائر, romanized: Jayš al-ʿAšāʾir) and the Tribal Fighters (Arabic: مقاتلي العشائر, romanized: Muqatili al-Asha'ir), was a multi-tribal militia affiliated with the Syrian Military Intelligence Directorate that took part in the Syrian Civil War on the side of the Ba'athist government. Led by Turki al Buhamad, the Fighters of the Tribes played a vital role in the Assad government's efforts to retake central and eastern Syria. The militia was affiliated with the pro-Ba'athist branch of the Arab Socialist Movement, and is closely allied with Russia.

== History ==
The "Forces of the Fighters of the Tribes" were founded by the Arab Socialist Movement as "auxiliary force" for the Syrian Army at some point during the Syrian Civil War, reportedly during or shortly after the Raqqa campaign (2012–13). They were organised by Turki al Buhamad, a member of the Arab Socialist Movement's political office who had to flee his native Raqqa Governorate due to persecution by rebel forces. The militia initially counted about 200 fighters, and waged a guerilla campaign for the government in Deir ez-Zor Governorate. Disguised as insurgents, Turki's militants would kidnap actual rebels and hand them over to local security forces. Turki was later sent to Damascus, where he and Omar Adnan al-Alawi, the Arab Socialist Movement's assistant secretary general, began organising new branches of the Tribal Army. While his original followers continued to fight in Deir ez-Zor Governorate, Turki recruited new troops in Homs.

The militia's Homs branch took part in operations in the Syrian steppe and Syrian Desert in early 2016, such as the Ithriyah-Raqqa offensive (February–March 2016), the Palmyra offensive (March 2016), and the Battle of al-Qaryatayn (March–April 2016). By mid-2016, the group fought at the central Syrian frontlines, where government forces were trying to progress toward al-Sukhnah. In course of these operations, disputes erupted among the Tribal Army as members of one of its sub-units, the Druze Bayraq al-Suwayda, felt that the recruitment promises were not being kept. As result, they mutinied and tried to leave Palmyra for their homes in as-Suwayda, but were detained by other Fighters of the Tribes. Eventually, the head of as-Suwayda's NDF intervened in order to ensure that they were released.

Later during 2016, the Tribal Army mostly concentrated on operations in and around Aleppo, where they fought in the last phase of the four years-long battle for the city. They helped to fully encircle the rebel-held parts of Aleppo, and then participated in Operation Dawn of Victory that saw the final defeat of the city's rebels. For their good combat performance during these engagements, the militia was praised by Zayd Ali Saleh, head of the security and military committee in Aleppo. Nevertheless, a group of about 500 Fighters of the Tribes proved in the following months to be prone to looting and harassment of Aleppo's civilian population; for this, they were transferred for disciplinary reasons to al-Khafsah. Meanwhile, the rest of the militia fought in the eastern Aleppo countryside against ISIL.

Around mid-2017, Turki al Buhamad had managed to recruit another force for the Tribal Army which took part in the Syrian Desert campaign (May–July 2017) and a government campaign to retake all of central Syria. When the pro-government forces captured several towns at the southern bank of the Euphrates River, most importantly Ghanem al-Ali, the militia was deployed to garrison them. After other government troops had left the area, ISIL launched a major counter-attack. It overran several government positions, forcing the Tribal Army to retreat. About 79 fighters of the militia fled north into SDF-held areas. Carrying white flags, they surrendered to the SDF in order to prevent ISIL from capturing them. The militiamen were then transferred to Kobanî while negotiations began between the SDF and government forces for their release. Eventually, however, dozens of these tribal fighters decided to join the SDF instead of returning to the government, as they felt that Turki al Buhamad had abandoned them. The commander had allegedly fled during the ISIL counter-attack while leaving his men behind.

In August 2017, a pro-Syrian opposition news site reported that members of Turki's militia had been involved in a shootout with another pro-government group, the Desert Commandos Regiment, in Homs. The clash had allegedly resulted from disputes over control of brothels in the city. By 2018, the Fighters of the Tribes were considered to be among the most important pro-Russian militias in Syria, and vital to the improving fortunes of the Syrian government. According to Jorf News and Nedaa Syria, the Military Intelligence raided the homes of members of the militia and arrested several on charges of corruption in August 2019. Turki al Buhamad allegedly paid the intelligence agencies around LS 200 million to avoid arrest himself.

The group was contributing troops to a government offensive in northwestern Syria in early 2020. (Note: As can be seen in a photo collection of article by the Long War Journal, one of pro-government fighters killed during this offensive belonged to the Forces of the Fighters of the Tribes. The militia's emblem can be seen on his photo.)

== Organization and recruitment ==
Besides Turki al Buhamad, the Fighters of the Tribes are also led by his brother Ahmad al Buhamad; both of them are part of the Al Buhamad tribe of Raqqa Governorate. Their militia claims to have thousands of supporters among tribes in central Syria, and its recruits are mostly drawn from eastern Syrian tribal members (such as the Deir ez-Zor and al-Hasakah Governorates), though they also have fighters from the Aleppo, Hama, and as-Suwayda Governorates. Pro-Opposition sources have accused the Fighters of the Tribes of forcibly conscripting and blackmailing people into enlisting. Most of militia's troops are members of the Arab Socialist Movement. In all, the Tribal Army claimed to have about 5,000 fighters by 2017, and are one of the most important tribal militias in Syria.

The group is closely allied with and supported by Russia, and is trained by the Russian Armed Forces as well as by Hezbollah fighters. Despite this, the Tribal Army suffers from indiscipline. The militia is also influenced by Iran.

== See also ==
- List of armed groups in the Syrian Civil War
- Military Intelligence Directorate (Syria)
