= Rashdin =

Rashdin رشدين
- Village
- Location within Iran
- Coordinates: 38°50′56″N 46°40′41″E
- Country: Iran
- Province: East Azerbaijan
- County: Khoda Afarin
- Bakhsh: Minjavan
- Rural District: Minjavan-e Gharbi

Population (2006)
  - Total: 30
- Time zone: UTC+3:30 (IRST)
  - Summer (DST): UTC+4:30 (IRDT)

Rashdin (Persian: رشدين, also Romanized as Rashdīn; also known as Pashti, Rashatīn, Rashtīn, and Rashty) is a village in Minjavan-e Gharbi Rural District, Minjavan District, Khoda Afarin County, East Azerbaijan Province, Iran. At the 2006 census, its population was 30, in 4 families.
