= Ithriyah-Raqqa offensive (February–March 2016) =

Military operation conducted by the Syrian Arab Army against ISIL

- Part of the Syrian Civil War
- Map of the course of the offensive (also included the concurrent ISIL-led Khanasir offensive). Red dotted line denotes the Syrian Government frontline prior to offensive. Syrian Army control Opposition control (including al-Qaeda in the Levant) Islamic State of Iraq and the Levant
Date	11 February – 5 March 2016 (3 weeks and 2 days)
Location	Eastern Hama Governorate and Southern Raqqa Governorate, Syria
Result	Offensive stalls; limited Syrian Army advances: The Syrian Army advances to the Zakiyah crossroad before halting

Belligerents
(Syria) Syrian Arab Republic: Syrian Armed Forces	Islamic State

Units involved
Syrian Army: 4th Armoured Division; 555th Brigade; Desert Hawks Brigade; National Defence Forces: Golan Regiment; Military Intelligence Directorate: Forces of the Fighters of the Tribes	(Islamic State) Military of ISIL

The Ithriyah-Raqqa offensive (February–March 2016) was a military operation conducted by the Syrian Arab Army against ISIL, during the Syrian Civil War, with the aim of reaching the ISIL-held Al-Tabqa Military Airport.

== The offensive ==
On the morning of 11 February 2016, the Syrian Arab Army's 555th Brigade of the 4th Mechanized Division, along with the National Defense Forces (NDF), Liwaa Suqour Al-Sahra (Desert Hawks Brigade), Kataebat Al-Ba'ath (Al-Ba'ath Battalions), and Fouj Al-Joulan (Golani Regiment), launched an offensive eastward to recapture the Ithriyah-Raqqa Road that leads to the Tabqa Military Airport. They began their assault by storming Hill 5 along the Ithriyah-Raqqa Road, and after nearly three hours of fierce battle with ISIS, they were able to establish full control over three points in the eastern Hama desert: Hill 5, Tal Abu Zayn and a water well at the village of Tal Zakiyah. At this point, the Syrian Army was 45 kilometers from the Al-Tabqa air base.

The next day, Syrian government forces advanced from Tal Abu Zayn, capturing Tal Madakhah hill. They had also reached Tal Zakiyah in the afternoon, thus entering the southern Raqqa countryside, and coming within 35 kilometers of the airbase. Meanwhile, west of Ithriyah, the military seized two villages along the Ithriya-Salamiyah Road, near Sheikh Hilal. On 13 February, government troops seized the Zakiyah crossroad, in southern Raqqa, while also further advancing in the Sheikh Hilal area.

On 14 February, the Syrian Army seized Tal Masbah hill, 15 kilometers east of Ithriyah. ISIS fighters retreated towards the desert village of Jubb Al-Qutna. On 15 February, several hills around Zakiyah were also captured.

On 17 February, the Army approached Marina, positioning themselves five kilometers west of the village, while fighting continued at Zakiyah. The next day, after an 8-hour battle that started in the early morning, government troops captured Tal Al-'Alam hill, four kilometers from Marina.

Between 20 and 21 February, government forces captured two hills ("Point 4" and "Point 5"), near Zakiyah, and the village of Al-Massabah.

On the evening of 21 February, ISIL launched two offensives with the aim of cutting the government's supply line that runs through Ithriyah. One of these was a large assault against the road running from Ithriyah towards Aleppo city, to the north, more specifically against the Khanasir-Aleppo Road. During this operation, ISIL cut the road for seven days and captured the strategic town of Khanasir, before the Army managed to retake all areas they had lost along the highway. The second attack was aimed at the Sheikh Hilal-Ithriyah Road, west of Ithriyah, which was also cut. By 28 February, all points lost were recaptured by the military in the Sheikh Hilal area, except the Al-'Azeeb Checkpoint. The simultaneous ISIL assault on the two roads had left Syrian Army units along the Salamiyah-Raqqa Highway trapped during this time. Later on the same day, the Syrian Army captured the last point on the Sheikh Hilal-Ithriya Road that was held by ISIL, thus reopening the supply route.

On 3 March, the Syrian Army recaptured all points they had to abandon at the Zakiyah crossroad days earlier, due to the cutting of the supply route. Two days later, ISIL once again cut the Sheikh Hilal-Ithriyah Road, killing 15–20 soldiers, before the military repelled the attack and re-secured the road. Following this, the Syrian Army shifted their focus from the Al-Tabqa Military Airport to the Jirah Military Airport and Deir Hafir, further north in Aleppo Province. This came in the aftermath of the failed ISIL offensive at Khanasir, during which government forces captured 13 villages previously held by ISIL.

== Aftermath ==
On 2 June, the military announced the start of a new offensive from Ithriyah, with the aim of liberating Raqqa city.

== See also ==
- Battle of Aleppo (2012–2016)
- Northern Aleppo offensive (2016)
- East Aleppo offensive (2015–16)
