= Palmyra offensive (May 2015) =

2015 military operation of the Syrian Civil War

Coordinates: 34.5600°N 38.2672°E

- Part of the Syrian Civil War
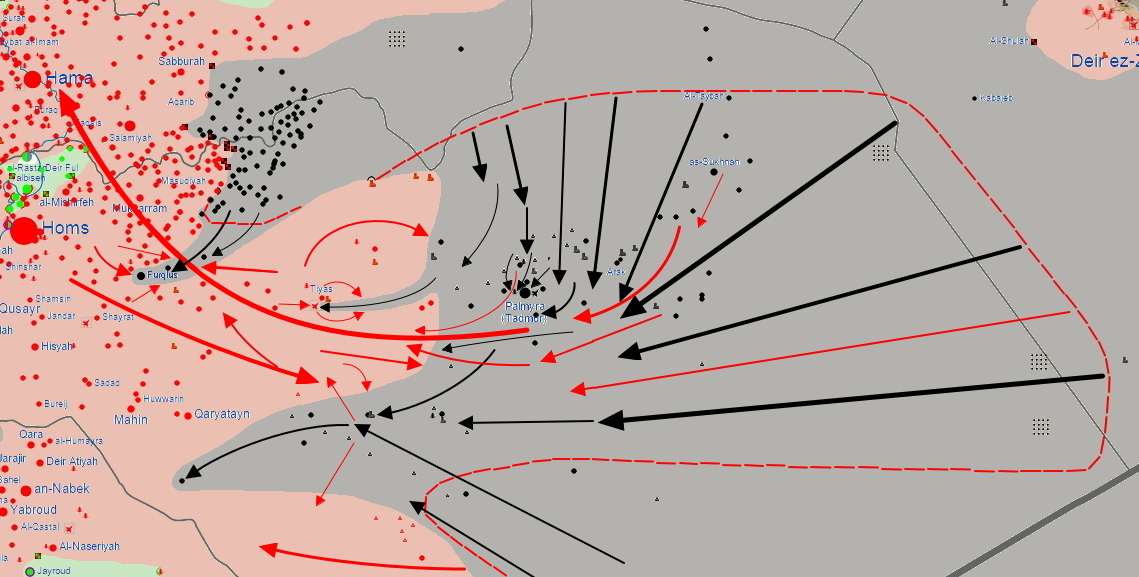
- Map of the territorial gains made by ISIL from 13–26 May, during the Palmyra offensive
Date	13–26 May 2015 (1 week and 6 days)
Location	Tadmur District, Eastern Homs Governorate, Syria
Result	Major ISIL victory: ISIL control of Syria increases to around 50% by the end of the offensive
Territorial changes	ISIL captures Palmyra, its airbase and Weapons Depot, Al-Sukhnah, Amiriya, three oil fields, T-3 Pumping Station, At Tanf Border Crossing, al-Sawana area and Missile Battalion area

Belligerents
Islamic State	(Syria) Syrian Arab Republic

Commanders and leaders
Abu Malik Anas al-Nashwan †; Abu Laith al-Saoudy; Mouhaimn al-Ta'ai † Abu Jarrah al-Shami †	(Syria) Talal al-Barazi (Governor of the Homs Governorate) (Syria) Brig. Gen. Haidar Ali Asad † (Syria) Brig. Gen. Malek Taleb Baddour †

Units involved
Military of ISIS; Badr Battalion; Sabri Battalion	Syrian Arab Armed Forces; Syrian Arab Army; 18th Armored Division; Desert Hawks Brigade; National Defence Forces (NDF); Ba'ath Brigades

Strength
1,800–2,000+ (Palmyra city)	Unknown

Casualties and losses
241–300 killed (SOHR claim); 170–200 killed (Syrian Army claim)	150 killed (SOHR claim); 81 killed (Syrian Army claim)
- 71 civilians killed (49 executed by ISIL; 14–15 May); 168–280 civilians and soldiers executed, and 600 detained (21–24 May)

The Palmyra offensive of May 2015 was a military operation launched during the Syrian Civil War by the Islamic State (IS) on May 13–26, 2015, in an attempt to capture the government-held Tadmur District of the Homs Governorate, including the administrative centre of Tadmur, known in English as Palmyra. The ruins and ancient monuments of Palmyra, which lie on the south-western fringe of the modern city, have been a UNESCO World Heritage Site since 1980. The ruins were part of a desert oasis that was one of the most significant cultural centers of the ancient world, linking the civilizations of Persia, India, China with the Roman Empire through trade. The offensive was one of the largest offensives launched by ISIL, the largest one conducted by ISIL in Syria since the 2014 Eastern Syria offensive, with the result of the offensive increasing ISIL's control of Syria to at least 50%.

== The offensive ==
=== Initial ISIL advance ===
On 13 May 2015, ISIL took advantage of the military's redeployment the day before to Idlib province, where ongoing fighting was taking place, and launched a two-pronged offensive towards Palmyra and its military sites, including Station 3 and the large weapon depots. The operation started on the outskirts of Al-Sukhnah, northeast of Palmyra. The militants captured al-Thinayya checkpoint at the northern entrance to the town, after which they advanced into major parts of Al-Sukhnah, with fighting taking place at the main police station, the headquarters of the Ba'ath Party and the National Hospital. This caused a state of panic among civilians in Palmyra and raised concerns about the possibility of ISIL attacking the nearby archaeological monuments. In the end, ISIL took control of Al-Sukhnah, giving them control over a strategic highway linking Homs with the Deir ez-Zor Governorate to the northeast.

After the capture of Al-Sukhnah, ISIL took all the Syrian Army posts between it and Palmyra. Fighting took place near the government security center of Hajjana and the officers' housing east of Palmyra, with ISIL taking control of several checkpoints, after hitting them with missiles. As they advanced to the outskirts of Palmyra, they seized all of the Amiriya area, north of the city, or at least its northern part, and the Muktab Al-Dour checkpoint in the eastern outskirts. ISIL also reportedly took a large government ammunition warehouse outside Palmyra, and was bombing a nearby government-controlled airport. The militants attempted to breach the eastern sector of the T-4 airbase but were repelled. According to a pro-government source, the Syrian Army later launched a counter-attack and recaptured Amiriya and the Muktab Al-Dour checkpoint. Before nightfall, the Syrian Army and the NDF launched a counterattack at Al-Sukhnah as well, and reportedly infiltrated ISIL positions at the southwestern corridor. In the evening ISIL seized Burj al-Ishara, a strategic high point near the historic Palmyra Castle. At the end of the day, ISIL was still in control of the Deir ez-Zor-Al-Sukhnah road, with the Syrian Army attempting to retake it.

The first day of fighting left 70 Syrian Army and 40 ISIL fighters dead, including the offensive's top ISIL commander. On 14 May, the Syrian Army shelled Burj al-Ishara, while ISIL made an attempt to break into the city of Palmyra. The jihadists managed to enter the neighbourhoods in the eastern outskirts of the city, but were expelled by government troops. After re-securing once again the Muktab Al-Dour checkpoint, government forces reportedly advanced to the village of Al-Basateen, where the eastern frontline remained that night. ISIL also targeted during the day the Tadmor Prison and the airport in an attempt to seize the airbase's major weapons depot. Elsewhere, government troops took full control of the Al-Hayl Gas Field, killing 32 militants, after which they proceeded to take Al-Thathah, Al-Fawl, Al-Mujawar, Al-Hawa, and Al-Sina'a. According to a military source, ISIL was still positioned one kilometer from Amiriya, and was in control of al-Sukhnah, but the Syrian Army remained at the outskirts of the village.

=== Syrian Army counter-offensive ===
On 15 May, the Syrian Army dispatched reinforcements to Palmyra, while ISIL was 1 km (0.62 mi) from the Palmyra archeological site, but pulled back from the eastern outskirts to about 2 km (1.2 mi) where clashes were still erupting as the Syrian Army launched a counter-offensive. ISIL once again captured the northern part of Amiriya, killing a number of civilians, before they were pushed out again by heavy air-strikes. Two more attacks were launched against the air-base, with both being repelled. During the night, ISIL shifted its focus to the ruins but were unable to infiltrate them. Before dusk, Syrian Army units continued their counterattack at al-Sukhnah, reaching the town's outskirts. Reinforcements from the special forces unit, "Suqur al-Sahara," arrived to reinforce government forces.

On 16 May, ISIL fighters reached the ruins and captured parts of the historic citadel of Fakhr-al-Din al-Ma'ani as fighting continued. Later, ISIL once again seized Amiriya and continued its advance, taking the northern part of Palmyra after a massive attack.

By the morning of the next day, the Syrian Army had pushed ISIL back from Palmyra, fully securing the city. The Syrian Army also recaptured Palmyra castle and reportedly, the strategic Radio and Television Communication Hill (Burj al-Ishara) as well. Life in the town returned to normal with stores and businesses gradually reopening. However, fighting continued to the north in Amiriya and east of Palmyra, where ISIL captured the T-3 Pumping Station and al-Hayl gas field.

On 19 May, the SAA and NDF recaptured Amiriya. As the Army smashed its way into forward ISIL positions, they discovered piles of tactical vests, thermal missiles, stacks of Muslim prayer books in Russian (left by Chechen fighters) and enough ammunition for each rebel to carry 10,000 rounds.

In addition to the fighting in and around Palmyra, clashes took place at the nearby Jazal oil field between 18 and 20 May, leaving 48 soldiers and 30 ISIL militants dead. 150 soldiers were also wounded.

=== ISIL captures Palmyra ===
On 20 May, ISIL recaptured Amiriya, and managed to advance into Palmyra, capturing a third of the city. ISIL attacks on other sectors around the town were reportedly repelled. The renewed ISIL push came after 600–800 militant reinforcements arrived. Later that day, ISIL nearly seized full control of Palmyra, after government forces withdrew. Government troops were still in control of a prison in the east and the military intelligence headquarters in the west. In an attempt to conserve some of the city's history, hundreds of statues were moved to safe locations, except for the large monuments that could not be moved. Fears were raised over the safety of the ruins and the city's museum. This rescue operation was led by the Dutch heritage expert René Teijgeler. By the evening, all Syrian Armed Forces had withdrawn from the city to its outskirts, and ISIL also captured the airbase.

According to state TV, the Syrian Army evacuated the city's civilians during their retreat. In contrast, residents reported that civilians were in fact not evacuated, and that SAA officers fled the city ahead of conscripts and militias, leaving them to fend for themselves. The Syrian government later backtracked on the claim it had evacuated civilians after an increase in refugees from the city caused by the bombardment of the town.

On 21 May, ISIL fighters entered the ruins. Meanwhile, ISIL captured the Tanf Border Crossing, which was the last government-held border crossing with Iraq. On 22 May, the American-led coalition in Syria conducted one airstrike near Palmyra, which destroyed six ISIL anti-aircraft artillery systems, and an ISIL artillery piece.

Between 23 and 24 May, ISIL captured the al-Sawana area and the Missile Battalion base on the Palmyra–Homs road, resulting in the capture of more than 22 pro-government fighters. The next day, 25 May, ISIL attacked the village of Jazal, located in the Al-Sha’ar Mountains and near the government's strategic power grids and gas fields that provide electricity and gas to the western part of the country. After four hours of fighting, the assault was repelled.

On 26 May, the frontline had reportedly moved to Al-Furqlus, the Shaar mountains, Qurayteen, and the Tiyas Airbase. On the next day, Syrian government forces advanced in the Jazal oil field region.

On 30 May, ISIL destroyed the infamous Tadmor Prison.

== Aftermath – Summer 2015 Ba'athist military offensive ==
In early July 2015, the Syrian military launched an offensive in an attempt to retake Palmyra, advancing up to 5 kilometres (3.1 mi) from the city. On 5 August 2015, the town of Al-Qaryatayn was captured by the ISIL militants. Capturing al-Qaryatayn was important to ISIL because the town is one of many along the Damascus-Homs Highway. On 6 August 2015, ISIL abducted 230 civilians, including at least 60 Christians from al-Qaryatayn. ISIL fighters later advanced even further, taking control of Mahin and Huwwarin by 8 August, thus forcing hundreds of Christians to flee persecution by the terrorist group. By November, ISIL militants had reached the outskirts of Salamiyah and were planning to advance towards the city of Homs itself until the Syrian government supported by Russian airstrikes launched a counteroffensive to push back the ISIL militants. In March 2016, another offensive was launched to retake the historic city of Palmyra, and the Syrian Army regained control of the town on 27 March 2016.

== Mass executions ==
During the offensive, ISIL conducted numerous executions. On 14 May, ISIL executed 26 civilians in Amiriya and al-Sukhnah for "dealing with the regime", of whom 10 were beheaded. The following day, another 23 civilians were executed in Amiriya, nine of them children.

On 22 May, various pro-opposition sources in the city reported ISIL had executed between 150 and up to 280 government loyalists and soldiers in the streets and in the public square by a shot-to-the-head or beheading. The executions were part of a purge which ISIL initiated, after capturing Palmyra, where the jihadists were conducting door-to-door searches to find and kill all government supporters or fugitive soldiers. The pro-opposition activist group the SOHR put the number of killed in the city at 168, with another 600 soldiers and civilians detained, while state TV reported 400 people had been executed. The pro-government Al-Watan newspaper put the number of executed at 450 as of 25 May. According to an SAA soldier, ISIL beheaded the 19-year-old daughter of a general.

In early July 2015, ISIS released a graphic video showing 25 members, some of whom appearing to be in their teens, each executing a captive dressed in dark fatigues in front of the Palmyra theatre's stage area.

On 18 August 2015, ISIS beheaded a respected antiquarian, Khaled al-Asaad (aged 83), who had worked for over 50 years as head of antiquities in Palmyra and hung his body on a column in a main square of the historic site. ISIS claimed that Khaled al-Asaad was serving as "the director of idolatry" in Palmyra.

== Strategic analysis ==
Matthew Henman of IHS Jane's Terrorism and Insurgency Center stated that the result of the battle at Palmyra showed that the Syrian government was being squeezed between Army of Conquest gains in northern Syria and ISIL, with ISIL needing to respond to the Army of Conquest's gains during the 2015 Jisr al-Shughur offensive.

Multiple analysts cited the ISIL victory at Palmyra as evidence of the Syrian government's strategic withdrawal to defend larger populations centers, with government control still accounting for about 50–60 percent of the population. Purportedly, in the view of the Syrian government, the fall of Palmyra was a tactical defeat but a strategic gain, as the capture of the city and the UNESCO World Heritage site would potentially encourage the United States to review its Syria policy, make Jordan more aware of the threat from ISIL, and force Iraq to increase cooperation with Syria.

Ayham Kamel, the Eurasia Group's Middle East & North Africa director, stated that the ISIL victory demonstrated that the Syrian government was no longer capable of maintaining nominal control in each of the provinces of Syria, and was possibly being forced to pick its battles.

== See also ==
- 2014 Eastern Syria offensive
- 2015 Northwestern Syria offensive
- Al-Hasakah offensive (May 2015)
- Qalamoun offensive (May–June 2015)
- Battle of Yarmouk Camp (2015)
- Hama and Homs offensive (March–April 2015)
- Al-Hasakah offensive (February–March 2015)
- Siege of Kobanî
- Military intervention against ISIL
  - American-led intervention in Syria
- List of wars and battles involving ISIL
