= Battle of al-Qaryatayn (2015) =

Military offensive by ISIL during the Syrian Civil War

Battle of al-Qaryatayn (August 2015)
- Part of the Syrian Civil War
Date	5 August 2015 (1 day)
Location	Al-Qaryatayn, Homs Governorate, Syria 34.2333°N 37.2333°E
Result	Islamic State victory
Territorial changes	Islamic State captures the town of al-Qaryatayn

Belligerents
Islamic State: Military of the Islamic State	(Syria) Syrian Arab Republic: Syrian Armed Forces; National Defense Force; Syrian Arab Air Force

Commanders and leaders
(Islamic State) Abu Hassan Al Khatami †	(Syria) Talal al-Barazi (Governor of the Homs Governorate)

Casualties and losses
~27 militants killed	37 soldiers killed
- 230 civilians abducted by Islamic State

The Battle of al-Qaryatayn (2015) was a military operation launched by the Islamic State of Iraq and the Levant to capture the town of al-Qaryatayn, in August 2015, during the Syrian Civil War.

== Background ==
For much of the Syrian civil war, which began in March 2011, al-Qaryatayn remained relatively neutral in the conflict. Town elders made agreements with both government forces and the rebels to stay out of the fighting. However, its location is strategic as it lies at a crossroads between the northern and southern parts of the country. Al-Qaryatayn has served as conduit for both sides. Rebels smuggle arms from the north to rebel fighters in Damascus, while the government uses the town to reinforce and resupply their forces in the north and west. It has also been used as a corridor for defectors from the Syrian Army from across the country as highways from the northern, southern, eastern and western directions run through al-Qaryatayn. In late May 2015, Islamic State forces captured Palmyra and the surrounding countryside after a large offensive.

== Islamic State takeover ==
On 5 August, the Islamic State captured the town of al-Qaryatayn. This resulted in the deaths of 40 Syrian soldiers and 27 Islamic State militants. It was reported that Islamic State use deserts of Homs as launchpad for the attack on Al Qaryatayn and the master mind of this operation was an Islamic State Emir known as Abu Hassan Al-Khatami. Abu Hassan was killed in the battle and Islamic State renamed the battle after him as Battle of Abu Hassan Al Khatami in order to pay tribute to his services to the Islamic State.

== Aftermath ==
On 6 August, The Islamic State group abducted 230 civilians, including at least 60 Christians from Al-Qaryatayn. Islamic State later advanced even further, capturing Mahin and Huwwarin by 8 August, thus pushing hundreds of Christians to flee persecution. However, the Syrian military recaptured Mahin later after intense airstrikes and ground force attack that killed 20 IS fighters.

On 9 August, the SAAF bombed Islamic State positions in al-Qaryatayn, resulting in the deaths of around 30 Islamic State fighters as well as the destruction of seven vehicles and a rocket depot, according to governmental sources. On 13 August, SOHR reported fierce fighting between the SAA and Islamic State fighters in the area between al-Qaryatayn and Mahin and Huwwarin, when the Islamic State attempted to advance towards the two towns. The Islamic State briefly managed to capture both Mheen and Hawwarin west of Al-Qaryateyn city on 31 October in an attempted general offence on Sadad, before losing this territory 22–23 November.

The SAA later recaptured al-Qaryatayn in the Battle of al-Qaryatayn (2016).
