= Homs offensive (November–December 2015) =

Part of the Syrian Civil War

Homs offensive (November 2015)
- Part of the Syrian Civil War and the Russian military intervention in the Syrian Civil War
- The military situation in & around the Homs Governorate. Syrian Army control Islamic State of Iraq and the Levant control Syrian Opposition control Ongoing confrontation or unclear situation
Date	5 November – 29 December 2015 (1 month, 3 weeks and 3 days)
Location	Homs Governorate, Syria
Result	Syrian government victory: The Syrian Army captures Mahin, Huwwarin, Hadath, half a dozen other villages and a dozen hills; Government forces imposed full control over the Palmyra-Homs Highway; Government forces less than 2km away from the city gates of Palmyra

Belligerents
Syria: Syrian Army; Syrian Air Force; National Defence Forces Iran; Hezbollah; Christian militias: SSNP; Sootoro; Guardians of the Dawn Air strikes: Russia: Aerospace Forces	Islamic State

Units involved
Syrian Army: 18th Armored Division; 67th Armored Brigade; 120th Mechanized Brigade; 2nd Armored Division; Guardians of the Dawn: Usud al-Cherubim; Ararat Group; Qalamoun Shield Forces; Russia: Spetsnaz GRU advisors; Russian Marines	Military of the Islamic State

Strength
~7,000 Syrian troops 60+ Russian Marines	Unknown

The Homs offensive was conducted by Syrian government forces during the Syrian Civil War from November to December 2015. The objective of the operation was to recapture territory lost to ISIL, in the eastern part of the Homs Governorate, during the fall of that year.

== The offensive ==
On 5 November, Syrian government forces launched the offensive from the Mahin-Sadad checkpoint and recaptured the Tal Sinni, Tal Hazim, and Al-Wastani hilltops, after clashes with ISIL. Two days later, they carried out an assault at the eastern slopes of the Jabal Al-Hiyal Mountains, seizing several points and advanced to east towards the ancient city of Palmyra.

On 14 November, Syrian government forces captured the hilltop of Tal Hazim Al-Thalatha. Additionally, two days later, they seized the Tal Syriatel, Jabal Ma'ar, Al-Bayarat, the Ancient Palmyra Quarries, Al-Kassarat and Al-Dawa area outside the city of Palmyra after a series of intense firefights with ISIL.

On 17 November, Syrian government troops captured the Jabal Al-Hazzm Mountains along the Sadad-Mahin Road and the small village of Al-Hadath to north of the ISIL-held town of Mahin. Four days later, they seized the village of Huwwarin and the strategic hill the Tal Daher. Later, the military captured the large Army Storage Base near Mahin. On the next day, government forces captured the Jabal Maheen Mountains and parts of Mahin, which was fully secured by 23 November, as ISIL retreated to the town Al-Qaryatayn. On the same day, the Army also took control of the Al-Qadri Farms and the Hayyan Mountains, positioning them approximately 4 km away from the western gates of Palmyra, as well as 2 km away from the Qatari Villa near the Homs-Deir Ezzor Highway.

On 25 November, Syrian government forces advance in the vicinity of Al-Qaryatayn and took control of Tel Al-Dekan, Tel Um Kadom, Tel Masayed hills in the surroundings of the town.

On 28 November, Syrian government forces, backed by the Russian Air Force, advanced and captured the small villages of Muntar Armilah and Thaniyah, just a few kilometers away from Al-Qaryatayn, along the Mahin-Quryatayn Road.

On 7 December, Syrian government forces imposed full control over the strategic Palmyra-Homs Highway after seizing the villages of Al-Bayarat and Marhatten in the western countryside of the ancient city of Palmyra.

On 10 December, ISIL recaptured the towns of Mahin and Huwwarin, and two hills, after launching a counter-offensive. Later, government forces counter-attacked and reportedly partially recaptured the town of Huwwarin. Five days later, ISIL recaptured Hadath.

On 19 December, Syrian government forces approached the Palmyra Castle, after a violent battle with ISIL. This latest advance brought them within 400 meters of the castle, and less than 2 km from the city's gates. On the same day, Syrian government forces recaptured the 5th Precinct of Mahin, after a fierce battle with ISIL.

On 20 December, Syrian government forces recaptured the Mahin-Sadad Checkpoint after ISIS retreats towards Mahin.

On 23 December, Syrian government forces recaptured the village of Hadath. Later, government forces imposed full control over Jabal Al-Hazzm, Jabal Maheen Al-Kabeer, and Al-Kazeeya, after an intense battle with the ISIL near the strategic town of Mahin.

On 27 December, Syrian government forces recaptured the town of Huwwarin.

On 29 December, Syrian government forces imposed full control over the Mahin Warehouses and Jabal Mahin (Mahin Mountain), which overlooked Mahin. Later on that day, the Syrian Army recaptured the town of Mahin.

== See also ==
- 2012 Homs offensive
- Russia–Syria–Iran–Iraq coalition
