= Al-Kadir =

al-Kadir الكدير al-Kader
- Village
- Location in Syria
- Coordinates: 35°16′25″N 38°50′33″E
- Country: Syria
- Governorate: Homs Governorate
- District: Tadmur District
- Nahiyah: Al-Sukhnah

Population (2004)
  - Total: 694
- Time zone: UTC+3 (EET)
  - Summer (DST): UTC+2 (EEST)

Al-Kadir (Arabic: الكدير, also spelled al-Kader) is a village in eastern Syria, administratively part of the Homs Governorate. It is located in the Syrian Desert with the Euphrates River to the northeast, the nearby village of al-Kawm to the south and Deir ez-Zor to the east. According to the Central Bureau of Statistics (CBS), al-Kadir had a population of 694 in the 2004 census.

== Syrian Civil War ==
ISIL captured Al-Kadir as a part of their expansion into Syria in 2014. The town was liberated by Syrian Army forces on 15 August 2017.
