= Al-Bayda, Tadmur =

al-Bayda البيضة al-Bayda al-Sharqiyah
- Village
- Location in Syria
- Coordinates: 34°30′32″N 37°56′16″E
- Country: Syria
- Governorate: Homs
- District: Tadmur
- Subdistrict: Tadmur

Population (2004)
  - Total: 670
- Time zone: UTC+3 (EET)
  - Summer (DST): UTC+2 (EEST)

al-Bayda (Arabic: البيضة; also spelled Beida; also known as al-Bayda al-Sharqiyah) is a village in eastern Syria, administratively part of the Homs Governorate. It is situated in the Syrian Desert on the road between Tadmur (Palmyra) in the east and Tiyas in the west. According to the Central Bureau of Statistics of Syria (CBS), al-Bayda had a population of 670 in the 2004 census.
