= Al-Hafar, Syria =

Al-Hafar الحفر
- Village
- Location in Syria
- Coordinates: 34°15′8″N 36°54′14″E
- Country: Syria
- Governorate: Homs
- District: Homs
- Subdistrict: Sadad

Population (2004)
  - Total: 589
- Time zone: UTC+3 (AST)

Al-Hafar (Arabic: الحفر, romanized: al-Ḥafr, also spelled al-Hafr) is a village in central Syria, administratively part of the Homs Governorate, south of Homs. It is situated in the Syrian Desert, located south of Sadad, west of Huwwarin and northeast of Qarah. According to the Central Bureau of Statistics (CBS), al-Hafar had a population of 589 in the 2004 census. Its inhabitants are predominantly Syriac Christians. The village was founded in 1829 by residents from nearby Sadad.

== See also ==
- Fairouzeh
- Zaidal
- Maskanah
- Al-Qaryatayn
- Sadad
