= Al-Taybah, Homs Governorate =

Al-Tayba الطيبة Tayyiba
- Village
- Location in Syria
- Coordinates: 35°5′16″N 38°54′46″E
- Country: Syria
- Governorate: Homs
- District: Tadmur
- Subdistrict: al-Sukhnah

Population (2004)
  - Total: 2,413
- Time zone: UTC+3 (EET)
  - Summer (DST): UTC+2 (EEST)

Al-Tayba (Arabic: الطيبة, also spelled Tayyiba or Tayibah) is a village in eastern Syria, administratively part of the Homs Governorate. It is located in the Syrian Desert, near the Euphrates River to the east and al-Sukhnah and the village of al-Kawm to the west. Like many of the other desert towns in Syria, it is situated in a spring-fed oasis. According to the Central Bureau of Statistics (CBS), al-Taybah had a population of 2,413 in the 2004 census.

== History ==
Al-Taybah is an Arabic name meaning 'the Good'. In the early 13th-century Syrian geographer Yaqut al-Hamawi noted al-Taybah was a "village in the district of 'Urd, lying between Palmyra and Aleppo". He noted that the village marked the western boundary of the Taghlib's tribal territory.

Al-Taybah was visited in 1616, during Ottoman rule (1517–1918) by Italian explorer Pietro Della Valle, who noted that the presence of several "old relics" in the village. The mosque was well-maintained and appeared to have previously served as a church tower. Residences consisted of mud huts, many of which were reinforced by ancient stone columns.

=== Modern period ===
The village was abandoned sometime in the 18th century with its inhabitants migrating to nearby al-Sukhnah. In 1838 al-Taybah was classified as an abandoned village by English scholar Eli Smith. The modern settlement was founded in 1870 after one of the descendants of the 17th-century emigrants from al-Taybah and a resident of al-Sukhnah obtained permission by the governor of the Sanjak of Zor (Deir ez-Zor). He established the new village with ten or twelve other families. The Ottomans set up a gendarmerie post there afterward.

At some point between 1914 and 1918, during World War I when Ottoman authority in Syria was being challenged, al-Taybah was raided and looted by Bedouin tribesmen from the area, resulting in a second exodus of the village's residents. It was resettled during French Mandate rule which restored a level of security in al-Taybah. In the 1960 Syrian census, the village had a population of 220.

During the Syrian Civil war, the Islamic State of Iraq and the Levant (ISIL) captured the village. On 20 August 2017, the Syrian Army assaulted the al-Taybah area from their positions at the al-Kawm axis, pushing through ISIL's front-lines. Unable to maintain their positions, ISIL retreated from al-Taybah, enabling the Syrian Army to gain control after a short battle.

== Bibliography ==
- Fowden, Elizabeth Kay (1999). The Barbarian Plain: Saint Sergius Between Rome and Iran. Berkely and Los Angeles: University of California Press. ISBN 978-0-520-21685-3.
- Lewis, Norman (2000). "The Syrian Steppe during the Last Century of Ottoman Rule: Hawran and the Palmyrena". In Mundy, Martha; Musallam, Basim (eds.). The Transformation of Nomadic Society in the Arab East. Cambridge: Cambridge University Press. pp. 33–43. ISBN 0521770572.
- Musil, A. (1928). Palmyrena: A Topographical Itinerary. American Geographical Society..
- Le Strange, G. (1890). Palestine Under the Moslems: A Description of Syria and the Holy Land from A.D. 650 to 1500. London: Committee of the Palestine Exploration Fund. OCLC 1004386.
- Robinson, E.; Smith, E. (1841). Biblical Researches in Palestine, Mount Sinai and Arabia Petraea: A Journal of Travels in the year 1838. Vol. 3. Boston: Crocker & Brewster.
