= Fairouzeh =

Village in Syria

Fairouzeh فيروزة
- Village
- Location in Syria
- Coordinates: 34°42′08″N 36°45′32″E
- Country: Syria
- Governorate: Homs
- District: Homs
- Subdistrict: Homs
- Elevation: 550 m (1,800 ft)

Population (2004)
  - Total: 6,456
- Time zone: UTC+3 (AST)

Fairouzeh (Arabic: فيروزة, romanized: Fayrūzah) is a village 3 miles southeast of the city of Homs in Syria. Due to urban development in the area, Fairouzeh, like nearby Zaydal, is now considered one of Homs' suburbs. In 2004, it had a population of 6,456. Its inhabitants are predominantly Syriac Christians.

== Etymology ==
The origin of the name "Fairouzeh" is disputed. Many believe it originates from the word fayruz, meaning "turquoise" in Syriac, in reference to the green color of the surrounding landscape. However, some historians believe the name "Fairouzeh" was mentioned in the Old Testament as "Berothah" (Second Book of Samuel, 8:8).

== History ==
The majority of the village's inhabitants were farmers. The majority of people owned enough land to grow wheat, barley, lentil, olive trees and wine grapes. Almost every family raised sheep, goats and chickens. The original farmers also owned horses, donkeys and cows. They were self-sufficient of basic food supply throughout the whole year.

The water source was acquired from deep wells about (18 to 20 meters). The two most famous wells (Jub) were Jub Hamza and Jub Jaaber. Without the existence of these two wells, the continuous life in Fayruzah as we know it would have not existed. The structure of Jub Hamza in the middle of the village was preserved as a “monument” for current and future generations. The village now uses city running water and electricity.

The elders in the village were known for their colorful and unique clothes. Most men, women and kids wore similar traditional outfits. The homes were built similar in shape and architectural design. Traditional home walls were built from hardened mud pieces and the roofs from wood and topped with mixed hay and mud. Some of the early big homes had several families living together side by side.

The most known family names in Fairouzah are: Abdullatif, Abdulnour, Abdulhai, Abdel Aziz, Askar, Assaf, Assfour, Attiyah, Ballat, Dabbas, Dabbous, Danial, Deeb, Dib, Diab, Darghali, Fattali, Fedail, Fleyeh, Ghanem, Ghreer, Habahab, Habroun, Hannoun, Hamad, Hawara, Halabi, Hourany, Howarah, Hushaan, Husari, Jubi, Joudi, Kassas, Khalil, Khazael, Maida, Mbarkeh, Maleh, Makhool, Mashhour, Masoudi, Mushamel, Nader, Nahim, Nasser, Nakkoud, Noufal, Nussais, Rahal, Roboz, Sayegh, Seder, Shahadeh, Shahla, Taweel, Trad, Watfa, Wanis, Kannich, Kannish Younan. In the last 50 years, many more families have moved to Fairouzah from neighboring towns and villages and made it their home.

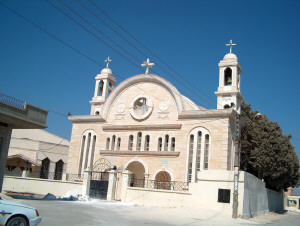
St. Elias Syriac Orthodox

Fairouzah’s population comprises about 7,000 people. Based on a current and future civil plan, it will occupy about 425 acres (1.72 km^{2}) of land when it is completed. The village is estimated to have been established around the 16th century. Its first inhabitants were mostly Syriac Orthodox Christians who came from Sadad in the 16th century. They migrated to Fayruzah to be closer to Homs and thus benefit from better living conditions. Most of them were farmers.

=== Modern era ===
In the early 20th-century all children attended elementary school. They were taught religious and general education. The first middle school was built in Fayruzah in 1949 as one of very few middle schools around Homs. Many students from Fayruzah and neighboring villages graduated from this school and continued their higher education in Homs and Damascus.

From the end of World War I until after the 1960s, a large wave of Fayruzah's residents emigrated to South America and to the United States, seeking better living conditions. Currently there exists a large community of Fairouzian people in Los Angeles and smaller ones in Detroit, Jacksonville and Miami. There are also a few families from the village living in Salta, Argentina. This is believed to be one of the reasons why the villagers were introduced to the traditional Argentinian drink, mate.

== See also ==
- Zaidal
- Al-Hafar
- Maskanah
- Al-Qaryatayn
- Sadad

== Bibliography ==
- Smith, Eli; Robinson, Edward (1841). Biblical Researches in Palestine, Mount Sinai and Arabia Petraea: A Journal of Travels in the Year 1838. Vol. 3. Crocker and Brewster.
