= Battle of al-Qaryatayn =

634 CE conflict between the Rashidun Caliphate and Ghassanids

- Part of the Muslim conquest of Syria
| Date | June 634 |
| Location | Al-Qaryatayn, Syria 34.2333°N 37.2333°E |
| Result | Muslim victory |
| Territorial changes | Rashidun forces capture Al-Qaryatayn |

Belligerents
| Rashidun Caliphate | Ghassanids |

Commanders and leaders
| Khalid ibn al-Walid | Jabala ibn al-Ayham |

Strength
| 9,000 | 10,000 |

Casualties and losses
| Very few | Unknown, but more than Muslims |

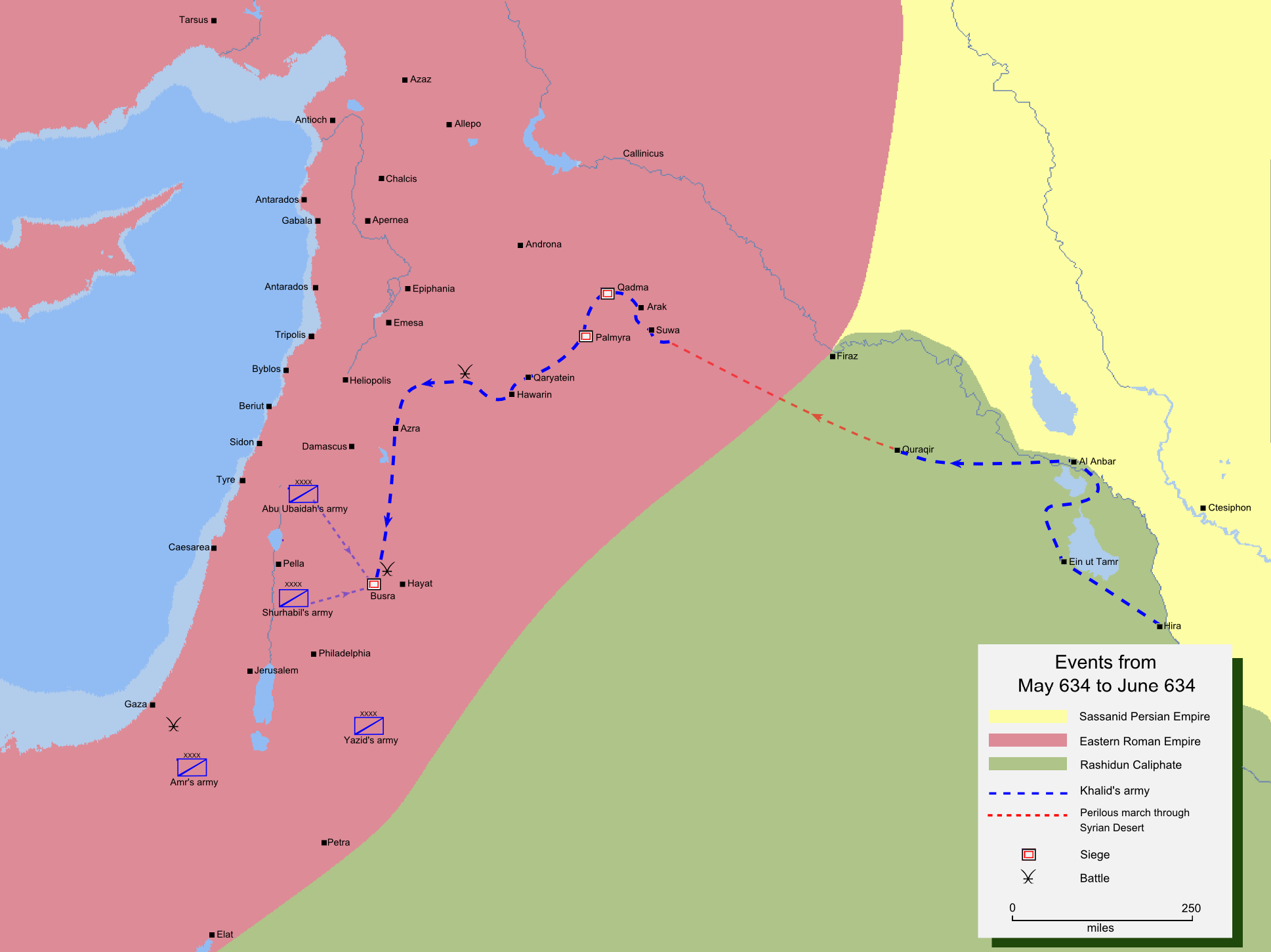
Mohammad adil-Muslim invasion of Syria.

Battle of al-Qaryatayn was a minor battle between the Christian Ghassanid Arab allies of the Byzantine Empire, and the Rashidun Caliphate army. It was fought after Khalid ibn al-Walid had conquered Tadmur in Syria. His army marched to al-Qaryatayn, the inhabitants of which resisted the Muslim army. They were fought, defeated and plundered. This resulted in the conquest of Al-Qaryatayn by the Muslim forces.
