= Battle of al-Qaryatayn (2016) =

Military operation

- Part of the Syrian Civil War and Russian military intervention in Syria
Date	3 March – 3 April 2016 (1 month)
Location	Al-Qaryatayn, Homs Governorate, Syria 34.2333°N 37.2333°E
Result	Decisive Syrian Army victory
Territorial changes	Syrian Army captures al-Qaryatayn

Belligerents
(Syria) Syrian Arab Republic; Syrian Social Nationalist Party; Al-Jabalawi Battalion; Russia	Islamic State of Iraq and the Levant

Commanders and leaders
Basil Dellah † (Qalamoun Shield commander)	(Islamic State) Unknown

Units involved
Syrian Armed Forces; Syrian Army; 3rd Armoured Division; 81st Armored Brigade; 11th Armored Division; 67th Armored Brigade; 18th Armoured Division; 120th Mechanized Brigade; Desert Hawks Brigade; Qalamoun Shield Forces; National Defence Forces; Military Intelligence Directorate; Forces of the Fighters of the Tribes; Syrian Air Force; Russian Armed Forces; Russian Air Force	(Islamic State) Military of ISIL; Wilayat Dimashq

Strength
4,000–4,500	Unknown

Casualties and losses
7 injured (pro-government claim; last day)	30+ killed (pro-government claim; last day)

The Battle of al-Qaryatayn (2016) was a military operation launched by Syrian government forces, supported by Russian airstrikes, to recapture the town of Al-Qaryatayn from the Islamic State of Iraq and the Levant. The town lies in a junction that connects the Iraqi border with Palmyra and from Palmyra through to Damascus; it fell to ISIL during the previous Battle of Al-Qaryatayn (August 2015).

== The offensive ==
The advance towards Al-Qaryatayn started on 3 March 2016, when the military seized several hilltops on the northern perimeter of the Jabal Al-Mahsaa mountain chain. The following day, they took control of the western perimeter of Tal Quraytayn hill. Between 7 and 21 March, 16 more hills were captured as government forces continued to advance west and south of Al-Qaryatayn.

After the Palmyra offensive (March 2016) that recaptured the city of Palmyra from ISIL on 27 March, Syrian government forces were free to intensify the operation on Al-Qaryatayn. Over the following three days, the Army effectively surrounded Al-Qaryatayn. Early on 30 March, the military attempted to breach the town from the southeast through the Al-Qaryatayn Orchards. However, this attack was repelled by ISIL’ machine gun nests after two hours of fighting. The following day, military reinforcements arrived in the area, including Russian military advisors.

On 2 April, the Russian Air Force began using attack helicopters to weaken ISIL defenses in the town. The Syrian Army in coordination with the National Defence Forces and SSNP fighters then entered the town with artillery support, taking control of two mountaintops and an orchard in the northwestern outskirts. 30 ISIL militants were killed and 7 SAA soldiers were injured. By the end of the day, the Suniyat-Homs mountain range, two kilometers from the town, was secured.

The Syrian Army took over most of the town on 3 April 2016. The military declared they captured the whole town, while according to the pro-opposition activist group the SOHR they were in control of about half of Al-Qaryatayn, including the town's center, with fighting continuing in the eastern and southeastern part where ISIL was on the verge of collapse. According to another military report, the Army was in control of 80% of the city. Later during the day, ISIL completely withdrew from Al-Qaryatayn. Some of the remaining ISIL militants attempted to retreat to the mountains in the north. ISIL forces laid land mines inside the town before retreating.

== Aftermath – 2017 ISIL counter-offensive ==
Amid a collapse of ISIL' forces against the SAA thrust towards Deir Ezzor, on 29 September 2017 ISIL launched simultaneous counteroffensives against the small towns of As Sukhnah, Bi'r Ghabaghib, and Bayt al Juhayshal to disrupt SAA logistics within the Deir Ezzor governate. As part of this offensive ISIL forces deep behind SAA lines attacked al-Qaryatayn and captured it and some surrounding territory after 2 days' fighting, leaving a pocket within SAA territory. SAA forces reportedly recaptured the town almost a month later on 22 October. The Palmyra Coordination Committee reported that 67 bodies, many summarily killed by ISIL, were found in the town.

== See also ==
- Battle of Al-Qaryatayn (2015)
- Palmyra offensive (May 2015)
- Palmyra offensive (March 2016)
