= Zaidal =

Town in Syria

Zaidal زيدل
- Town
- Location in Syria
- Coordinates: 34°42′50″N 36°47′0″E
- Country: Syria
- Governorate: Homs
- District: Homs
- Subdistrict: Homs

Population (2004)
  - Total: 5,710
- Time zone: UTC+2 (EET)
  - Summer (DST): UTC+3 (EEST)

Zaidal (Arabic: زيدل, also spelled Zaydal) is a town in the Homs Governorate of central Syria, just east of Homs, forming a part of its suburbs. Nearby localities include Fairouzeh to the south and the Homs neighborhoods of Karm al-Zaitun, al-Sabil and al-Zahra to the west. According to the Central Bureau of Statistics (CBS), Zaidal had a population of 5,710 in 2004. Its inhabitants are predominantly Syriac Christians.

== Notable people ==
- Rosemary Barkett (1939-): American judge and former nun, whose parents were from Zaidal.
- Ramón Exeni (es) (1938-): Argentine recognized physician, whose father was born in Florida but raised in Zaidal.

== See also ==
- Fairouzeh
- Al-Hafar
- Maskanah
- Al-Qaryatayn
- Sadad
