= Maskanah, Homs Governorate =

Maskanah مسكنة
- Village
- Location in Syria
- Coordinates: 34.664095°N 36.733544°E
- Country: Syria
- Governorate: Homs
- District: Homs
- Subdistrict: Homs

Population (2004)
  - Total: 4,430
- Time zone: UTC+3 (AST)

Maskanah (Arabic: مسكنة) is a village in central Syria, administratively part of the Homs Governorate, located just south of Homs. Nearby localities include Kafr Aya, Qattinah and Abil to the west, Jandar to the south and Fairouzeh and Zaidal to the northeast. According to the Central Bureau of Statistics (CBS), Maskanah had a population of 4,430 in the 2004 census. In 1945 the village had 900 inhabitants. Its inhabitants are predominantly Syriac Christians of the Syriac Orthodox Church and Syriac Catholic Church.

== Notable people ==
- Ignatius Moses I Daoud: Syriac Catholic Patriarch (1998 – 2001) and Cardinal of the Catholic Church.

== Bibliography ==
- Gibb, Hamilton Alexander Rosskeen (1991). The Encyclopaedia of Islam: MAHK-MID. Brill. p. 734. ISBN 9789004081123.
- Smith, Eli; Robinson, Edward (1841). Biblical Researches in Palestine, Mount Sinai and Arabia Petraea: A Journal of Travels in the Year 1838. Vol. 3. Crocker and Brewster.

== See also ==
- Fairouzeh
- Zaidal
- Sadad
- Al-Qaryatayn
- Al-Hafar
