= Khabrat az Zaqf =

Khabrat az Zaqf خبرات الزقف
- Country: Syria
- Governorate: Homs Governorate
- District: Tadmur District
- Occupation: United States

Khabrat az-Zaqf.

Khabrat az Zaqf (Arabic: خبرة الزقف) is a city in Syria. It is located in the Homs Governorate, in the southeastern part of the country, 270 km east of Damascus, the country's capital.

== Geography ==
The area around the desert is almost completely deserted and desolate Khabrat az Zaqf. There are about 14 people per square kilometer around Khabrat az Zaqf with a small population. The climate is hot and humid. The average temperature is 21 °C. The hottest month is August, at 35 °C, and the coldest is January, at 4 °C. The average annual rainfall is 151 millimeters. The wettest month is January, with 29 millimeters of rain, and the driest is August, with 1 millimeter.
