= Arak, Syria =

Arak آراك Urak
- Village
- Location in Syria
- Coordinates: 34°39′0″N 38°34′0″E
- Country: Syria
- Governorate: Homs
- District: Tadmur
- Subdistrict: Tadmur

Population (2004)
  - Total: 111
- Time zone: UTC+3 (EET)
  - Summer (DST): UTC+2 (EEST)

Arak (Arabic: آراك; also romanized as Ārāk) is a village in eastern Syria, administratively part of the Homs Governorate. It is situated on an oasis in the Syrian Desert along the road between Palmyra which is 28 kilometers to the southwest and al-Sukhnah to the northeast. According to the Central Bureau of Statistics of Syria (CBS), Arak had a population of 111 in the 2004 census.

== History ==
=== Roman era ===
Settlement in Arak existed at least from the Roman Empire-era in Syria when it was known "Aracha." Milestones were found in the village dating back to 75 CE and indicated that the Roman governor of Syria at the time, Marcus Ulpius Traianus, was ordering the construction of a road connecting Palmyra with Sura on the Euphrates River.

An altar in Arak during this era was dedicated to Yarhibol, the local deity of pagan Palmyra who was worshiped as the patron of the Efqa spring in that city since the Amorite period. The altar, which was built in 209 CE, read: "The altar which Maliku son 'mrbn erected to Yarhibol, to the one who irrigates Arak, to the Gad of the locality, the bountiful god."

=== Early and Middle Islamic periods ===
Khalid ibn al-Walid, the Arab general of the Rashidun army, conquered Arak during the initial stage of the Muslim conquest of Syria in 634. The town was fortified and defended by an Arab Christian garrison led by a Roman officer. Following their sighting of Khalid's army, the troops retreated to the fort and were subsequently besieged. An elderly scholar in Arak warned the Roman officer of Khalid's successful war record, telling him "beware of fighting this army." Consequently, the garrison surrendered the fort and negotiated terms with Khalid who imposed a jizya tax on the residents, but otherwise did not attack or plunder the town. The Rashidun army camped outside of Arak before continuing their march towards al-Sukhnah. There has also been evidence of Umayyad and early Abbasid occupation at Arak.

During Ayyubid rule, Syrian geographer Yaqut al-Hamawi noted Arak was a "small town on the border of the Aleppo Desert, near Palmyra and 'Urd, possessing palms and olives." During the early Mamluk era, in the mid-14th century, Ayyubid geographer Abu'l Fida noted that Arak, which he called "Araka" as the local Bedouin tribes referred to it, played a role in an attempted conspiracy by Aleppo's governor, Qara Sunqur, and the amir al-ʿarab (commander of the Arabs), Muhanna ibn Isa, to defect from Sultan an-Nasir Muhammad's authority. In the conspiracy, Arak was used by Qara Sunqur as a way station between the Hejaz (where he was on pilgrimage) to Aleppo in his evasion of an-Nasir's troops to confer with Muhanna.

=== Modern era ===
In 1838, during late Ottoman era, Arak was classified as a seasonal village or khirba by English scholar Eli Smith. In the late 19th-century, Arak consisted of fifteen huts and contained an Ottoman Army garrison. Not long after the garrison's establishment in the 1870s, the soldiers stationed in the village were withdrawn. Regular raids by Bedouin tribesmen ensued and made life increasingly difficult for Arak's inhabitants.

In 1908, Czech explorer Alois Musil noted that Arak contained fifteen abandoned huts; their former occupants had left together for their native Palmyra due to Bedouin raids. This was a frequently occurring cycle, whereby people from Palmyra would settle Arak for a time, then abandon it due to Bedouin raiding. The regional Al Abd Allah tribe plundered the village along with nearby al-Sukhnah in 1917, taking with them large hoards of furnishings and household goods. Consequently, Arak's residents largely abandoned the village and resettled in Palmyra. In the 1960 Syrian census, Arak had a population of 163.

During the Syrian civil war, the Islamic State captured the village during their Tadmur offensive in May 2015 and it was retaken by the Syrian government forces in June 2017.

== Bibliography ==
- Akram, A. I. (1970). The Sword of Allah, Khalid Bin al-Waleed: His Life and Campaigns. National Publishing House. Archived from the original on 2003-02-17.
- Butcher, Kevin (2003). Roman Syria and the Near East. Getty Publications. ISBN 0892367156.
- Gibb, H. A. R. (2003). The Encyclopedia of Islam. BRILL. part 157. ISBN 9004106332.
- Jabbur, Jibra'il Sulayman (1995). The Bedouins and the Desert: Aspects of Nomadic Life in the Arab East. State University of New York Press. ISBN 0791428516..
- Kaizer, Ted (2002). The Religious Life of Palmyra: A Study of the Social Patterns of Worship in the Roman Period. Franz Steiner Verlag. ISBN 3515080279..
- Mundy, Martha; Musallam, Basim (2000). Transformation of Nomadic Society in the Arab East. Cambridge University Press. ISBN 978-0-521-77057-6.
- Robinson, Edward; Smith, Eli (1841). Biblical Researches in Palestine, Mount Sinai and Arabia Petraea: A Journal of Travels in the year 1838. Vol. 3. Boston: Crocker & Brewster.
- Strange, le, Guy (1890). Palestine Under the Moslems: A Description of Syria and the Holy Land from A.D. 650 to 1500. Committee of the Palestine Exploration Fund.
- Temporini, Hildegard (1978). The Rise and Fall of the Roman World. Vol. 9. Walter de Gruyter. part 2. ISBN 3110071754.
- Wright, William (1895). An Account of Palmyra and Zenobia: with Travels and Adventures in Bashan and the Desert. T. Nelson and Sons.
