= Al-Kawm, Homs =

al-Kawm الكوم
- Village
- Location in Syria
- Coordinates: 35°11′00″N 38°52′00″E
- Country: Syria
- Governorate: Homs Governorate
- District: Tadmur District
- Nahiyah: Al-Sukhnah
- Elevation: 1,519 ft (463 m)

Population (2004)
  - Total: 1,771
- Time zone: UTC+03:00 (EEST)

Al-Kawm (Arabic: الكوم; also spelled, el-Kowm) is a village in the al-Kowm oasis in central Syria north of al-Sukhnah and south of Raqqa. The oasis also contains a series of important archaeological sites, together known as El Kowm. According to the 2004 census, the village had a population of 1,771.

== History ==
In the 1960 Syrian census, al-Kawm had a population of 193.

Al-Kawm and its surrounding areas were affected by frequent clashes between the Syrian Arab Army and ISIS militants. On 18 April 2019, a commander of the Syrian special forces and 13 soldiers disappeared after ISIS militants attacked Syrian army positions east of al-Kawm.

On 21 April 2019, ISIS fighters reportedly took control of the town after clashes with Syrian government forces, resulting in the deaths of 15 Syrian soldiers. . During the same period, ISIS militants conducted raids around the town, managing to retake territory in the surrounding desert, surrounding and ambushing two Syrian army battalions numbering 500 soldiers, before they were relieved by fighters from the pro-government Palestinian militia Liwa al-Quds, estimates suggest around 50 pro government fighters killed including senior officers of the Syrian army Between 12-13 December 2022, ISIS militants temporarily took control of the town for three days under the cover of fog following clashes near the area on 12 December, that resulted in the deaths of 6 Syrian soldiers.

By 25 February 2025, the village was entirely deserted.
