= Mahin, Syria =

Mahin مهين
- Town
- Location in Syria
- Coordinates: 34°14′33″N 37°3′32″E
- Country: Syria
- Governorate: Homs
- District: Homs
- Subdistrict: Mahin

Population (2004)
  - Total: 11,064
- Time zone: UTC+3 (AST)

Mahin or Mheen (Arabic: مهين, romanized: Mahīn) is a town in central Syria, administratively part of the Homs Governorate, south of Homs.

== Description ==
It is situated on an oasis in the Syrian Desert, between Sadad to the west and al-Qaryatayn to the east, adjacent to the ancient village of Huwwarin. According to the Central Bureau of Statistics (CBS), Mahin had a population of 11,064 in the 2004 census. Its inhabitants are predominantly Sunni Muslims.

== Battle of Mahin ==
In August 2015, the Islamic State captured Mahin. The city was regained by the Syrian Army on 29 December 2015 during the late offensive of Homs in 2015.

== Bibliography ==
- Robinson, E.; Smith, E. (1841). Biblical Researches in Palestine, Mount Sinai and Arabia Petraea: A Journal of Travels in the year 1838. Vol. 3. Boston: Crocker & Brewster.
