= Abu Malik al-Tamimi =

Anas Ali Abd al-Aziz al-Nashwan, (Note: Arabic: أنس علي عبد العزيز النشوان) also known as Abu Malik al-Tamimi al-Najdi (Note: Arabic: أبو مالك التميمي النجدي) (died 13 May 2015), was a Saudi jihadist cleric and senior Sharia official in the Islamic State.

Al-Tamimi was an enthusiastic member of the Saudi religious police who was being groomed for a position in the Saudi Ministry of Justice before leaving the country in 2009 for Afghanistan, where he fought in Kunar and Nuristan and was lightly wounded. He eventually moved to Syria, where he swore allegiance to ISIS.

He was killed in the Palmyra offensive in 2015.
