= William Wright (missionary) =

Irish missionary in Damascus, author of The Empire of the Hittites

- Born: 15 January 1837
- Died: 31 July 1899 (aged 62)
- Occupation: Missionary

William Wright (15 January 1837 – 31 July 1899) was an Irish missionary in Damascus and the author of The Empire of the Hittites (1884), which introduced the history of the recently discovered Hittite civilization to the general public. He is the author of the quote Absence of evidence is not evidence. He is the father of Australian poet and journalist David McKee Wright.

== Publications ==
- The Empire Of The Hittites, with the Decipherment of the Hittite Inscriptions by Professor A. H. Sayce
- The Brontes in Ireland
- An Account Of Palmyra And Zenobia: With Travels And Adventures In Bashan And The Desert

== Sources ==
- Carlyle, E. Irving (1900). "Wright, William (1837-1899)" . In Lee, Sidney (ed.). Dictionary of National Biography. Vol. 63. London: Smith, Elder & Co.
