= Al-Sukhnah, Syria =

Town in Syria

Al-Sukhnah السخنة Sikne
- Town
- Location in Syria
- Coordinates: 34°53′12.5″N 38°52′19.5″E
- Country: Syria
- Governorate: Homs
- District: Palmyra
- Subdistrict: Al-Sukhnah
- Elevation: 1,510 ft (460 m)

Population (2004)
  - Total: 16,173
- Time zone: UTC+3 (AST)

Al-Sukhnah (Arabic: السخنة, romanized: as-Suxnah) is a town in eastern Syria under the administration of the Homs Governorate, located east of Homs in the Syrian Desert. Nearby localities include Mayadin and al-Asharah to the east, al-Taybah and Raqqa to the north, Salamiyah to the west, Arak and Tadmur (Palmyra) to the southwest.

According to Syria Central Bureau of Statistics (CBS), al-Sukhnah had a population of 16,173 in the 2004 census. It is the administrative center of the al-Sukhnah nahiyah ("subdistrict") which consists of six localities with a collective population of 21,880 in the 2004 census. The town's inhabitants are predominantly Sunni Muslims. Al-Sukhnah has attracted hundreds of residents from nearby villages in the 20th century and is currently a processing center for natural gas.

== Etymology ==
Al-Sukhnah means "the Warm" in Arabic, and is so named because of the nearby sulphur springs. As late as the early 20th century, the inhabitants of the village would bathe in the hot springs.

== History ==
=== Early Islamic period ===
In 634, following the capture of Arak by the Rashidun army of Khalid ibn al-Walid, al-Sukhnah peacefully received the Muslim force upon hearing the generous surrender terms negotiated for Arak.

In 1225, al-Sukhnah was described by Arab geographer Yaqut al-Hamawi as "a small town in the Syrian Desert, lying between Tadmur and 'Urd and Arak. Beside its spring are palm trees. It is on the road of one going to Damascus from Raqqa, and you come to it before reaching Arak." In the mid-14th century, Ibn Battuta wrote that al-Sukhnah was "a pretty town" with a mostly Muslim population. He noted that al-Sukhnah received its name from the heat of its water, and that there were bathhouses in the town.

=== Ottoman period ===
Throughout the 17th and 18th centuries, al-Sukhnah served as an important trade center in the Syrian Desert among the inhabitants of nearby villages and various Bedouin tribes. In particular, the Sawakhina ("people from al-Sukhnah"), were integral in the commerce with the 'Anizzah tribal confederation. Unlike most Bedouin groups, the 'Anizzah did not maintain economic relations with the inland villages of Syria and their trade with al-Sukhnah was unique. The 'Anizzah would trade camels, horses, alkali ashes and leather while merchants from al-Sukhnah marketed wheat, clothing, arms and utensils. By the mid-19th-century, however, its role decreased with the rise of Deir ez-Zor, and many of its inhabitants migrated to that city and to Aleppo, Homs and Hama.

In the early 20th-century, al-Sukhnah had about 100 houses and a large, fortified outpost manned by an Ottoman garrison. Its inhabitants were impoverished and were engaged in the subsistence farming of grain.

=== Post-independence Syria ===
Until the present day, al-Sukhnah continues to function as a trading center between its residents and the tribes in its vicinity, such as the 'Umur and the Sba'a, two sub-branches of the 'Anizzah. In the 1960 Syrian census, al-Sukhnah had a population of 2,648.

==== Syrian civil war ====
The town was taken by rebels early in the Syrian civil war. On 25 July 2013, the Syrian Observatory for Human Rights reported that the government-loyal Syrian Arab Army secured the town, after expelling the al-Nusra Front.

After a number of unsuccessful attempts, the Islamic State in Iraq and Syria captured the town on 13 May 2015, as part of their wider offensive to control Tadmur (Palmyra) and the Syrian Desert, a strategic area that is key to ISIS supply lines and an area with numerous oil wells. During the battle for al-Sukhnah, the Syrian Army incurred 70 fatalities, while ISIS lost 40 of its militants. About 1,800 families fled the town for safety in Tadmur. Following their capture of al-Sukhnah, ISIS militants executed 26 civilians, beheading ten of them.

Since the final Palmyra offensive in February 2017, a battle which resulted in a major Syrian government victory, government forces made advances along the Palmyra-Al Sukhnah Road. By 27 July 2017, the government forces had reached and captured strategic hills less than two kilometres from the town. On 6 August 2017, government forces recaptured the town in the Central Syria offensive; this left the road open to the besieged city of Deir ez-Zor.

During the Syrian opposition offensives in 2024, it was captured by the leading group of the offensive Tahrir al-Sham.

== Economy ==
The residents of Sukhnah were linked to the different tribes in the region through various hierarchical economic ties. They paid the levy on their grain harvest to the Sba'a, who in return protected their trade. They also consigned their sheep flocks to the 'Umur and the Hadidiyin. To all these tribes, al-Sukhnah's residents supplied grain, cloth, clothing, and various household items and foodstuffs, while purchasing from them pastoral products for resale to Syria's large cities. Today, al-Sukhnah has become a minor industrial center for natural gas.

== Bibliography ==
- Akram, A. I. (1970). The Sword of Allah, Khalid Bin al-Waleed: His Life and Campaigns. National Publishing House. Archived from the original on 2003-02-17.
- Boulanger, Robert (1966). The Middle East, Lebanon, Syria, Jordan, Iraq, Iran. Hachette.
- Douwes, Dick (2000). The Ottomans in Syria: a history of justice and oppression. I.B. Tauris. ISBN 1860640311.
- Gibb, H. A. R. (2003). The Encyclopedia of Islam. BRILL. p. 157. ISBN 9004106332.
- Mundy, Martha; Musallam, Basim (2000), Transformation of Nomadic Society in the Arab East, Cambridge University Press, ISBN 978-0-521-77057-6.
- Smith, Eli; Robinson, Edward (1841), Biblical Researches in Palestine, Mount Sinai and Arabia Petraea: A Journal of Travels in the Year 1838, vol. 3, Crocker and Brewster
- le Strange, Guy (1890), Palestine Under the Moslems: A Description of Syria and the Holy Land from A.D. 650 to 1500, Committee of the Palestine Exploration Fund.
