= Palmyra (modern city) =

City in central Syria

Palmyra تَدْمُر Palmyra
- City
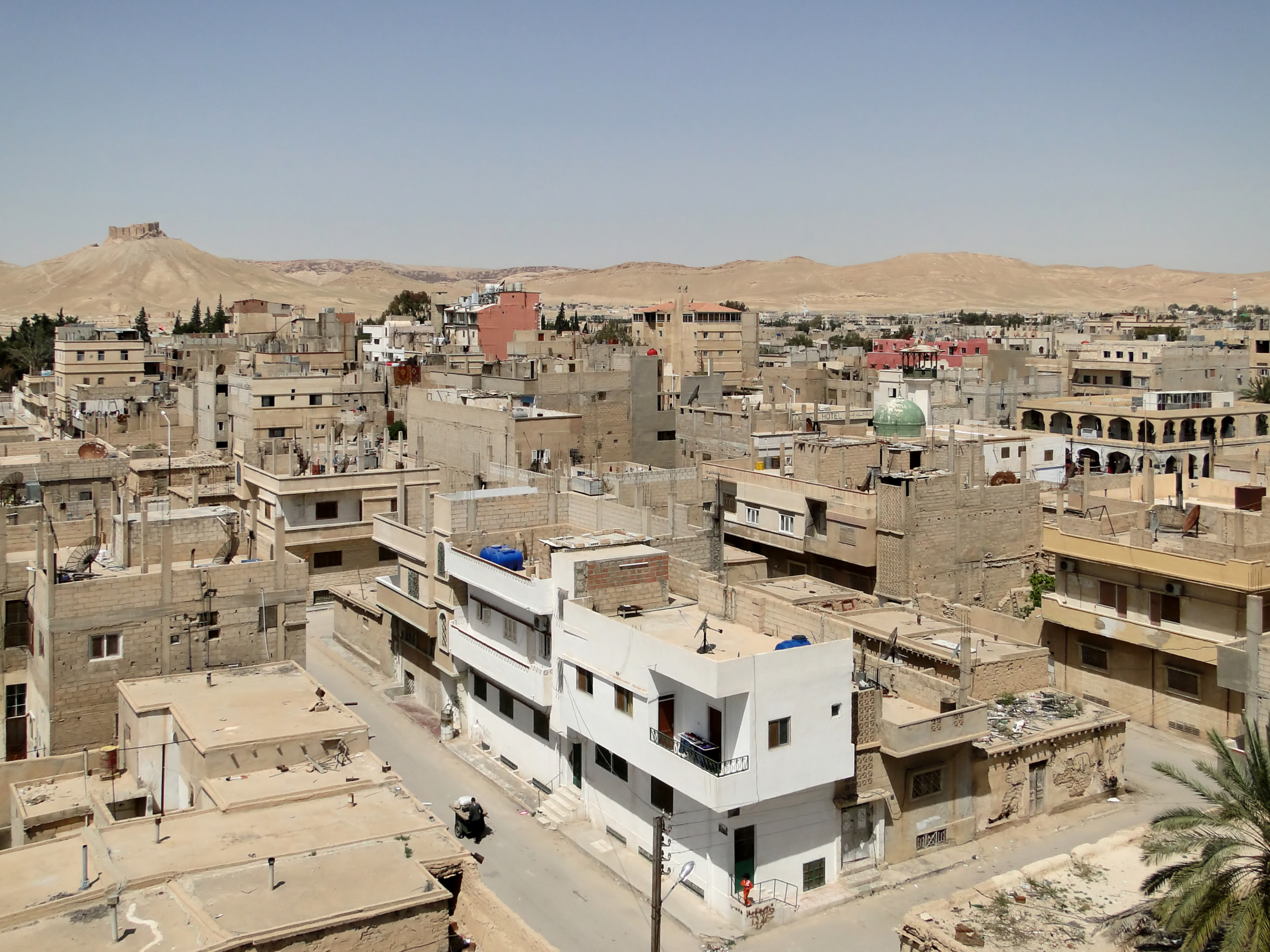
- The modern town of Palmyra

- Location in Syria
- Coordinates: 34°33′36″N 38°16′2″E
- Country: Syria
- Governorate: Homs
- District: Palmyra
- Subdistrict: Palmyra
- Elevation: 405 m (1,329 ft)

Population (2004 census)
  - Total: 51,323
- Demonym(s): Arabic: تدمري, romanized: Tadmuri
- Time zone: UTC+03:00 (AST)
- Area code: 31
- Geocode: C2889

Palmyra (/ˌpɑːl-maɪrə/; Arabic: تَدْمُر, romanized: Tadmur; Palmyrene: 𐡶𐡣𐡬𐡥𐡴 Tadmor) is a city in central Syria, administratively part of the Homs Governorate. It is located in an oasis in the middle of the Syrian Desert 215 kilometres (134 mi) northeast of Damascus and 180 kilometres (110 miles) southwest of the Euphrates River. The ruins of ancient Palmyra, a UNESCO World Heritage Site, are situated about 500 metres (1/3 mile) southwest of the modern city centre. Relatively isolated, the nearest localities include Arak to the east, Al-Sukhnah further to the northeast, Tiyas to the west and al-Qaryatayn to the southwest.

== Name ==
In Arabic, both cities are known as 'Tadmur'. Tadmur is the Semitic and earliest attested native name of the city; it appeared in the first half of the second millennium BC. The etymology of "Tadmur" is vague; Albert Schultens considered it to be derived from the Semitic word for dates ("Tamar"), (Note: The Semitic word T.M.R is the common root for the words that designate palm dates in Arabic, Hebrew, Ge'ez and other Semitic languages.) in reference to the palm trees that surround the city. (Note: The Hebrew Bible mentions "Tadmur" as a city built by Solomon, Schultens' argued that it is written "Tamor", and in the margin "Tadmur". Schultens considered "Tamor" to be derived from "Tamar", however, the inclusion of a -d- in "Tamar" cannot be explained.) 13th century Syrian geographer Yaqut al-Hamawi states Tadmur was the name of the daughter of one of Noah's distant descendants and that she was buried in the city.

In English and other European languages, the ancient and modern cities are commonly known as "Palmyra". The name "Palmyra" appeared during the early first century AD, in the works of Pliny the Elder, and was used throughout the Greco-Roman world. The general view holds that "Palmyra" is derived from "Tadmur" either as an alteration, which was supported by Schultens, (Note: According to Schultens, the Romans altered the name from "Tadmur" to "Talmura", and afterward to "Palmura" (from the Latin word "palma", meaning palm), in reference to the palm trees. Then the name reached its final form "Palmyra".) or as a translation using the Greek word for palm ("palame", παλάμη), (Note: The name could be a translation of "Tadmor" (assuming that it meant palm), and derived from the Greek word (Palame).) which is supported by Jean Starcky. Michael Patrick O'Connor argued for a Hurrian origin of both "Palmyra" and "Tadmur", citing the incapability of explaining the alterations to the theorized roots of both names, which are represented in the adding of a -d- to "Tamar" and a -ra- to "palame". According to this theory, "Tadmur" is derived from the Hurrian word "tad", meaning "to love", + a typical Hurrian mid vowel rising (mVr) formant "mar". "Palmyra" is derived from the word "pal", meaning "to know", + the same mVr formant "mar".

There is a Syriac etymology for Tadmor, referring to dmr "to wonder", and Tedmurtā (Aramaic: ܬܕܡܘܪܬܐ) "Miracle"; thus Tadmūra means "object of wonder", most recently affirmed by Franz Altheim and Ruth Altheim-Stiehl (1973), but rejected by Jean Starcky (1960) and Michał Gawlikowski (1974).

== History ==
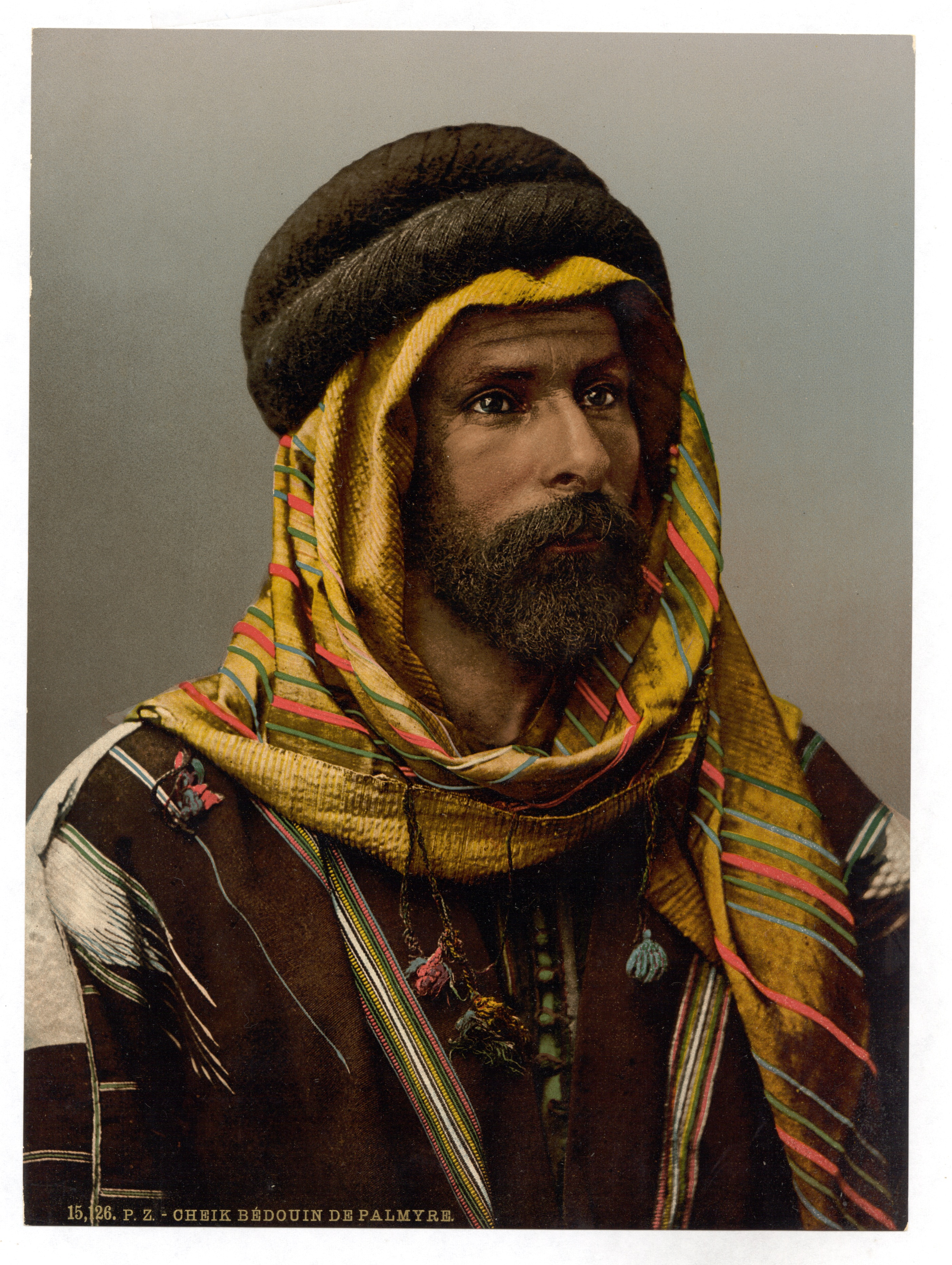
Bedouin Chief of Palmyra, Holy Land (i.e., Tadmur, Syria), between 1890 and 1900

=== Founding ===
In 1929, Henri Arnold Seyrig, the general director of antiquities in the French Mandate for Syria and the Lebanon, started excavating the ruins of Palmyra and forcibly displaced the villagers to a government-built village, adjacent to the ancient site. The relocation was completed in 1932, making the ancient city of Palmyra ready for excavations, while the residents settled in the new village of the same name.

=== 20th century ===
In the Ottoman period of early 1900s, Palmyra was a village of 6,000 inhabitants.

=== 21st century ===
==== Syrian civil war ====
On 13 May 2015, the militant terrorist organization the Islamic State (IS) launched an attack on the modern town, raising fears that the iconoclastic group would destroy the historic city. On 18 May IS captured the city, with their forces entering the area of the World Heritage Site several days later.

In May 2015, IS destroyed the tomb of Mohammed bin Ali, a descendant of the Islamic prophet Muhammad's cousin and son-in-law Ali, and a site revered by Shia Muslims, and sometime between then and 23 June destroyed the tomb of Nizar Abu Bahaaeddine, a Sufi scholar who lived in Palmyra in the 16th century. Abu Bahaaeddine's tomb was situated in an oasis about 500 metres (1,600 ft; 550 yd) from Palmyra's main ancient ruins. Mohammed bin Ali's tomb was located in a mountainous region 5 kilometres (3 mi) north of Palmyra. Ten days prior to the tombs' destruction, ISIL destroyed a number of tombstones at a local cemetery for Palmyra's residents. IS is also reported to have placed explosives around Palmyra. They also destroyed the Temple of Baalshamin in mid 2015.

In March 2016 a large-scale offensive by the SAA (supported by Hezbollah and Russian airstrikes) initially regained the areas south and west of the city. After capturing the orchards and the area north of the city, the assault on the city began. In the early morning hours of the 27 March 2016, the Syrian military forces regained full control over the city. In December 2016, IS retook the oilfields outside of the city, and began moving back into the city center.

On 1 March 2017, the Syrian army backed by warplanes, had entered Palmyra and captured the western and northern western sections of the city amid information about pulling back by IS from the city. The next day, the Syrian Army recaptured the entire city of Palmyra, after IS fully withdrew from the city.

On 19 April 2021, the Russian Defence Ministry announced that it had killed "up to 200 fighters", by targeting a "terrorist" base northeast of Palmyra.

== Demographics ==
Palmyra is the administrative centre of the Tadmur District and the Tadmur Subdistrict. According to the Syria Central Bureau of Statistics (CBS), the city had a population of 51,323 and the subdistrict a population of 55,062 in the 2004 census. Tadmur's inhabitants were recorded to be predominantly Sunni Muslims in 1838. It has a small Christian community. The city has a Syriac Catholic Church, which is the only church in the city. During the Syrian Civil War, the city's population significantly increased due to the influx of internally displaced refugees from other parts of the country.

== Economy ==
Palmyra is a modern resettlement of the ancient city of Palmyra, which developed adjacently to the north of the ancient ruins. The modern city is built along a grid pattern. Quwatli Street is the main road and runs east-west, starting from the Saahat al-Ra'is Square on the western edge of the town. The city served as a base for tourists visiting the ruins. It has a museum in the southwestern part of the city. Syria holds an annual cultural festival in Tadmur celebrating the city's ancient heritage. The Palmyra Airport is located here. The city is also home to the Tadmur Prison, which has historically held numerous opponents of the various Syrian governments.

Palmyra also serves as a center for Syria's phosphate mining and natural gas industries. The first phosphate mine run by the government was established near Tadmur and started production in 1971. Work to connect Tadmur's phosphate mines to the port of Tartus began in 1978. In 1986 Soviet surveyors discovered large iron ore deposits in the vicinity of Tadmur.

== Climate ==
Climate data for Palmyra (1991–2020 normals, extremes 1928–2016)
Month	Jan	Feb	Mar	Apr	May	Jun	Jul	Aug	Sep	Oct	Nov	Dec	Year
Record high °C (°F)	21.4 (70.5)	27.4 (81.3)	36.0 (96.8)	38.8 (101.8)	42.4 (108.3)	45.3 (113.5)	48.3 (118.9)	47.0 (116.6)	43.6 (110.5)	38.5 (101.3)	31.2 (88.2)	24.2 (75.6)	48.3 (118.9)
Mean daily maximum °C (°F)	12.4 (54.3)	15.1 (59.2)	19.6 (67.3)	25.8 (78.4)	31.4 (88.5)	36.1 (97.0)	38.8 (101.8)	38.7 (101.7)	34.7 (94.5)	28.5 (83.3)	20.0 (68.0)	13.9 (57.0)	26.2 (79.3)
Daily mean °C (°F)	7.6 (45.7)	9.6 (49.3)	13.5 (56.3)	19.0 (66.2)	24.2 (75.6)	28.4 (83.1)	30.7 (87.3)	30.7 (87.3)	27.3 (81.1)	21.9 (71.4)	14.0 (57.2)	9.0 (48.2)	19.7 (67.4)
Mean daily minimum °C (°F)	2.7 (36.9)	4.1 (39.4)	7.3 (45.1)	12.2 (54.0)	16.9 (62.4)	20.6 (69.1)	22.5 (72.5)	22.6 (72.7)	19.9 (67.8)	15.3 (59.5)	8.0 (46.4)	4.0 (39.2)	13.0 (55.4)
Record low °C (°F)	−10.4 (13.3)	−7.6 (18.3)	−6.7 (19.9)	−1.0 (30.2)	4.0 (39.2)	12.2 (54.0)	12.5 (54.5)	14.9 (58.8)	9.0 (48.2)	3.2 (37.8)	−6.1 (21.0)	−8.5 (16.7)	−10.4 (13.3)
Average precipitation mm (inches)	20.6 (0.81)	19.9 (0.78)	21.1 (0.83)	20.8 (0.82)	6.9 (0.27)	0.2 (0.01)	0.0 (0.0)	0.0 (0.0)	0.1 (0.00)	10.8 (0.43)	14.2 (0.56)	21.1 (0.83)	135.7 (5.34)
Average precipitation days (≥ 1.0 mm)	4.3	3.8	3.4	2.8	1.3	0.0	0.0	0.0	0.1	2.0	2.6	4.0	24.3
Average relative humidity (%)	73	64	54	33	39	34	37	39	42	45	56	72	49
Mean monthly sunshine hours	164.3	184.8	229.4	258.0	319.3	363.0	381.3	362.7	297.0	263.5	213.0	164.3	3,200.6
Mean daily sunshine hours	5.3	6.6	7.4	8.6	10.3	12.1	12.3	11.7	9.9	8.5	7.1	5.3	8.8
Source 1: NOAA (precipitation and sun 1961–1990) Meteostat
Source 2: Deutscher Wetterdienst (humidity, 1956–1978), Meteo Climat (record highs and lows)

== Bibliography ==
- Carter, Terry (2008). Syria and Lebanon 3. Lonely Planet. ISBN 978-1741046090.
- Federal Research Division (1988). Syria: A Country Study. The Division. ISBN 9780160016905.
- Robinson, Edward; Smith, Eli (1841). Biblical Researches in Palestine, Mount Sinai and Arabia Petraea: A Journal of Travels in the year 1838. Vol. 3. Boston: Crocker & Brewster.
- Le Strange, Guy (1890). Palestine Under the Moslems: A Description of Syria and the Holy Land from A.D. 650 to 1500. Committee of the Palestine Exploration Fund.
