= Sadad, Syria =

Town in Syria

Sadad ܣܕܕ صدد
- Town
- Location in Syria
- Coordinates: 34°18′46″N 36°55′33″E
- Country: Syria
- Governorate: Homs
- District: Homs
- Subdistrict: Sadad

Population (2004 census)
  - Total: 3,503

Sadad (Arabic: صدد / ALA-LC: Ṣadad) is a town in Syria, 60 kilometers (37 mi) south of Homs, and 101 kilometers (63 mi) northeast of Damascus, in the eastern part of the Qalamoun Mountains. It had over 3,500 inhabitants in the 2004 census, the majority of whom belonged to the Syriac Orthodox Church.

== History ==
=== Early history ===
Sadad shown as a Syriac Diocesese in the Middle Ages.

Sadad is an ancient village; it is thought to be the "Zedad" (Hebrew: צְדָד / Tzedad; translated as "Sedada" in the Vulgate) mentioned in the Old Testament (Book of Numbers, 34:8; Book of Ezekiel, 47:15), on the northeastern boundary of the biblical land of Canaan, the land promised to the Israelites.

Isolated on the edge of the desert, the community has remained predominantly Syriac Orthodox, even after the Muslim conquest of Syria in the mid-7th century. The village originally spoke a Western Aramaic dialect, similar to the dialect of Maaloula (53 km (33 mi) south of Sadad), which persisted until the 1830s when it was displaced as the mother tongue by Arabic. Traces of Aramaic in the Arabic dialect of Sadad were studied by Fadel M. Mubaraka in 2010. Therefore, Aramaic is spoken only as a second language by some people in the village. Sadad had been an important bishopric in the past. There was a close connection between Sadad and the Monastery of St. Moses the Abyssinian; according to Istifan al-Duwayhi, some of the monks of that monastery came from Sadad.

=== Modern era ===
In 1838, its inhabitants were noted as being predominantly Syriac Christians.

In a report of 1881, a French military attaché described the state of insecurity of Sadad, whose inhabitants seemed to suffer attacks from the Bedouins. Despite the tax its inhabitants regularly paid to the tribes that camped in the region, Sadad remained in constant risk of raiding. The inhabitants had therefore created adobe barricades around the village and its surrounding gardens, thus preventing anyone on horseback to enter without dismounting, which an isolated Bedouin rarely did in enemy territory.

Anthropologist Sulayman Jabbur, writing in the 1980s, noted that most of Sadad's working inhabitants made their income in the textile industry, primarily weaving abayas (robes) and woolen mats for the Bedouin tribesmen of the vicinity. The Bedouin usually acquired their clothing from villages along the desert fringes, such as Sadad, and the latter's inhabitants sold their products either directly to the Bedouin or indirectly via local merchants. According to Jabbur, the craft of weaving abayas was an ancient tradition passed down by generation to Sadad's inhabitants. Sadad was the most important market town for the Bedouin of the region, where they came to purchase clothing, tent equipment, saddles, coffee beans, tea and other supplies.

During the Syrian Civil War, on 21 October 2013, the town was captured by Islamist militants reportedly belonging to the al-Nusra Front, who set up loudspeakers in the main square, calling for residents to return to their houses. At least nine people were reported killed, as Syrian Army forces were sent in on 22 October to try and retake the town, sparking fierce resistance from the militants. Locals were unsure as to the reason behind the attack, though medical supplies within the town's hospital were a possibility, as well as the presence of a military depot nearby. By 28 October, the Syrian Arab Army had taken back control of Sadad. Visiting church leaders and returning villagers found two mass graves of civilians, including women and children, containing 30 bodies. They were suspected of being massacred by al-Nusra Front militants. Forty-five Christians were killed during the rebel occupation, and several churches were also looted.

== Demographics ==
The majority of the inhabitants are indigenous Assyrian Christians belonging to the Syriac Orthodox Church. According to the Syriac Orthodox patriarch, Mor Ignatius Aphrem Karim II, Sadad had a population of 15,000 in the summer of 2015, but following the advance of ISIL forces in the area in the fall, about 2,000 inhabitants remained.

== Main sights ==
The town is well known for its several churches, in particular, the church of Mar Sarkis and the church of Saint Theodore, both of which have elaborate, ancient frescoes; it is indeed unusual to find paintings on the walls of Syrian churches.

== Notable people ==
- Barsum Hilal of Sadad, priest and calligrapher in the 16th century.
- Abu Firas al-Hamdani, Baghdadi prince and poet buried at Sadad.
- Ignatius Abded Aloho II, Syriac Orthodox Patriarch.

== Bibliography ==
- Barsum, Ignatius Afram I (2003). Moosa, Matti (ed.). The Scattered Pearls: a History of Syriac Literature and Sciences. Gorgias Press.
- De Courtois, Sébastien (2002). Le Génocide oublié : Chrétiens d'Orient, les derniers Araméens (in French). Ellipses. ISBN 978-2729812300.
- Dodd, Erica (2001). The Frescoes of Mar Musa al-Habashi: a Study in Medieval Painting in Syria. Pontifical Institute of Mediaeval Studies. ISBN 978-0888441393.
- El Guindi, Fadwa (2008). By Noon Prayer: the Rhythm of Islam. Berg. ISBN 978-1845200978.
- Jabbur, Jibrail S. (1995). Jabbur, Suhayl J.; Conrad, Lawrence I. (eds.). The Bedouin and the Desert: Aspects of Nomadic Life in the Arab East. Albany: State University of New York Press.
- Jullien, Michel (1893). Sinaï et Syrie : souvenirs bibliques et chrétiens (in French). Société Saint-Augustin, Desclée de Brouwer et Cie.
- Robinson, E.; Smith, E. (1841). Biblical Researches in Palestine, Mount Sinai and Arabia Petraea: A Journal of Travels in the year 1838. Vol. 3. Boston: Crocker & Brewster.
- Rogers, Justin M.; Woods, Clyde M. (2006). Leviticus-Numbers. College Press. ISBN 978-0899008783.
- Walvoord, John F.; Zuck, Roy B., eds. (1985). The Bible Knowledge Commentary: Old Testament. Victor Books. ISBN 978-0882078137.

== See also ==
- Fairouzeh
- Zaidal
- Maskanah
- Al-Qaryatayn
- Al-Hafar
