= Al-Qaryatayn =

Town in central Syria

Al-Qaryatayn ٱلْقَرْيَتَين Karyatayn
- Town

Arab transcription(s)
  - English: "The two villages"
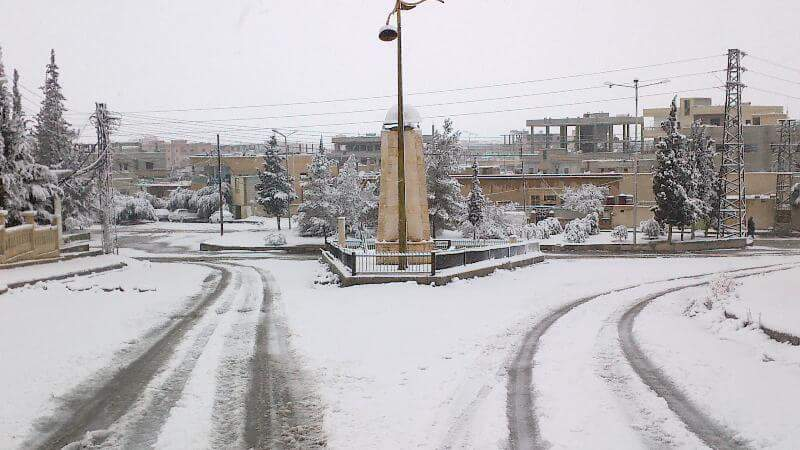

- Location in Syria
- Coordinates: 34°13′42″N 37°14′26″E
- Country: Syria
- Governorate: Homs
- District: Homs
- Subdistrict: Al-Qaryatayn
- Control: (Syria) Syrian transitional government

Population (2004)
  - Total: 14,208
- Time zone: UTC+3 (AST)

Al-Qaryatayn (Arabic: ٱلْقَرْيَتَين), also spelled Karyatayn, Qaratin or Cariatein, is a town in central Syria, administratively part of the Homs Governorate located southeast of Homs. It is situated on an oasis in the Syrian Desert. Nearby localities include Tadmur (Palmyra) to the northeast, Furqlus to the north, al-Riqama and Dardaghan to the northwest, Mahin, Huwwarin and Sadad to the west, Qarah, Deir Atiyah and al-Nabk to the southwest and Jayrud to the south. Al-Qaryatayn translates as "the two villages".

According to the Syria Central Bureau of Statistics, al-Qaryatayn had a population of 14,208 in the 2004 census. It is the administrative center of the al-Qaryatayn nahiyah ("subdistrict") which consists of three localities with a collective population of 16,795 in 2004. Its inhabitants are predominantly Sunni Muslims and Syriac Christians.

== History ==
=== Antiquity ===
There are numerous Greco-Roman-era buildings located in al-Qaryatayn, including an extensive sanitarium known as Hamaam Balkis ("Bath of Sheba"). During Roman rule, it served as a popular health resort, and a base for the legionary cavalry unit "Equites Promoti Indigenae". There are also a number of Corinthian columns and marble ornaments that date from this era, when nearby Palmyra was a major city in the region; Palmyrene inscriptions were found in the city written by Palmyrene residents and dedicated to the "Great God of Nazala". Prior to Islamic rule in the 7th century CE, the Ghassanids had a military installation in the town.

=== Early Islamic period ===
During the Muslim conquest of Syria, al-Qaryatayn's inhabitants invited Khalid ibn al-Walid's army in the summer of 634. Khalid's forces conquered the town, taking a large plunder from it before proceeding to capture other towns in the area. During Abd al-Malik's reign over the Umayyad Caliphate (646–705), his son al-Walid I used al-Qaryatayn along with adjacent towns in the area as a base of operations. Al-Walid II, who was known to be a corrupt caliph, held parties at the Umayyad palace in al-Qaryatayn during his brief reign between 743 and 744.

In late 1104, the Seljuk prince (emir) Suqman ibn Artuq died in the town on his way to Damascus after being summoned by the ruler of that city, Zahir ad-Din Tughtekin. Arab geographer Yaqut al-Hamawi visited al-Qaryatayn in the early 13th century and described it as "a large village belonging to Hims, and on the desert road. It lies between Hims, Sukhnah, and Arak ... It is two marches from Tadmur [Palmyra]." He also noted its inhabitants were all Christians. A 10,000-member brigade of the Mongol army raided the town and the surrounding region in 1260. Later that year, a Mamluk force led by Emir Salar pursued a retreating Mongol force back to al-Qaryatayn.

=== Ottoman rule ===
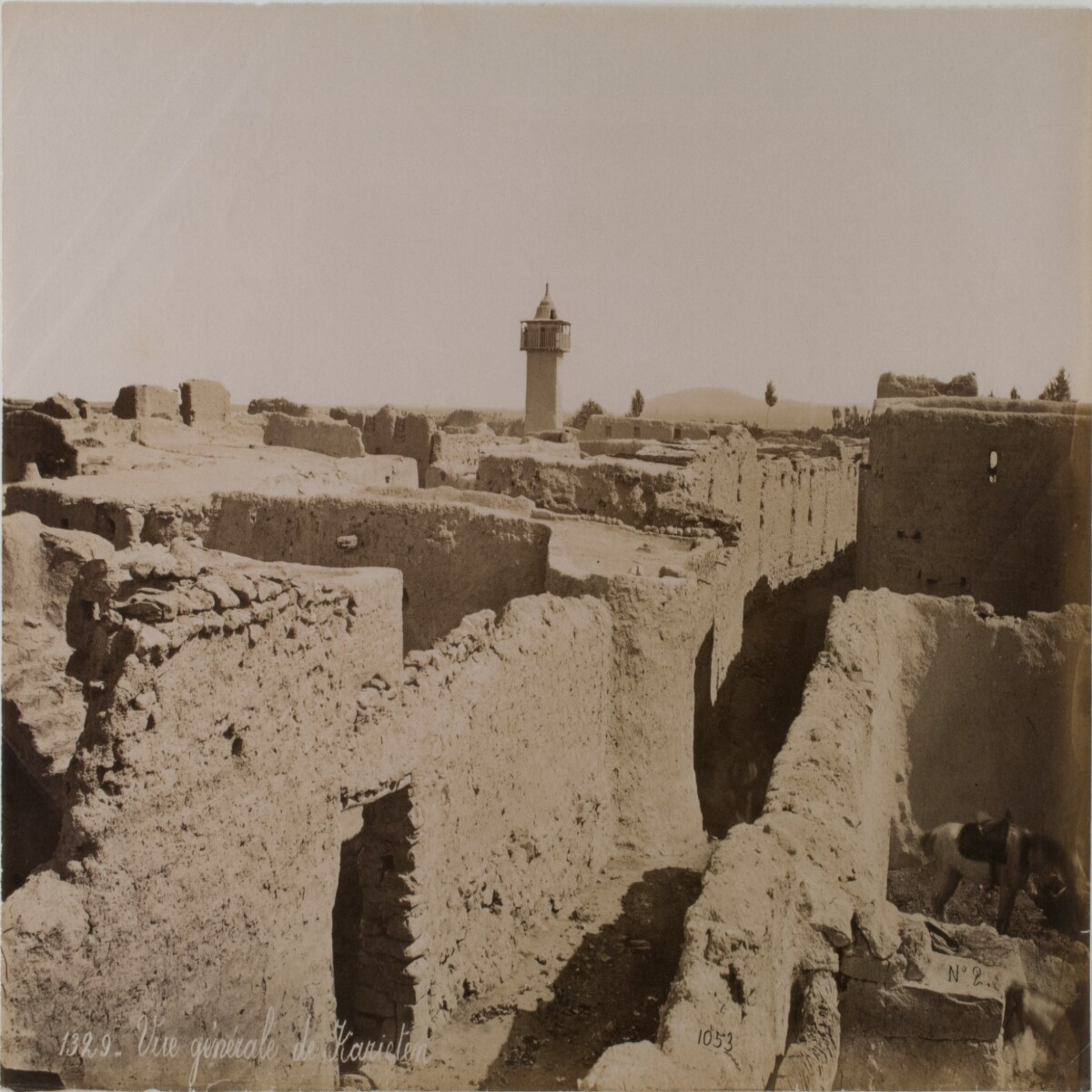
General view of al-Qaryatayn in 1867–1914, during late Ottoman rule

In the 19th century, al-Qaryatayn's economy, which depended on camel transport services, declined sharply due to the technological advances in transportation of the time, specifically the steamship and the train. This greatly reduced the number of Mecca-bound pilgrims who previously used al-Qaryatayn's inhabitants as guides or transport providers. In the middle part of that century, during the reign of the Egyptian governor of Syria, Ibrahim Pasha, al-Qaryatayn was a small village with mud brick homes. Its inhabitants were recorded as Muslims and Syriac Christians in 1838.

In the 1850s, al-Qaryatayn was described as a "large village" where two-thirds of the inhabitants were Muslims and the remainder Christians. Most of the Christians belonged to the Jacobite (Syriac Orthodox) church, but its followers were converting to Catholicism as part of a growing trend among Syria's Christians at the time. In 1908, Czech explorer Alois Musil noted that al-Qaryatayn was divided into six quarters, four Muslim and two Christian. The four Muslim quarters together consisted of six hundred huts, and two Christian quarters, one Syriac Orthodox with two priests and the other Syriac Catholic with one priest, consisted of some two hundred houses.

At the time of Musil's visit, al-Qaryatayn's sheikh was Ahmad ibn Fayyad Agha, and the village paid numerous regional Bedouin tribes, including the Ruwalla, Wuld Ali, Sba'a, and Fad'an, the annual khuwwa ('brotherhood') tribute as a means to either protect them from their plundering raids or to return goods stolen from the inhabitants by individual members of those tribes. This situation was a result of the weakness of al-Qaryatayn's sheikh, which was in contrast to his father, Fayyad Agha ibn Da'as (died 1903), under whom no tribe disturbed the village. That same year, British writer Gertrude Bell noted that Fayyad Agha (possibly Ahmad ibn Fayyad) was indisputably the "greatest brigand" in Syria at the time. During a visit in 1913, American traveler Lewis Gatson Leary described al-Qaryatayn as "a squalid village".

=== Syrian Civil War ===
For much of the Syrian Civil War, which began in March 2011, al-Qaryatayn remained relatively neutral in the conflict. Town elders made agreements with both government forces and the rebels to stay out of the fighting. However, its location is strategic as it lies at a crossroads between the northern and southern parts of the country. Al-Qaryatayn has served as conduit for both sides. Rebels smuggle arms from the north to rebel fighters in Damascus, while the government uses the town to reinforce and resupply their forces in the north and west. It has also been used as a corridor for defectors from the Syrian Army from across the country as highways from the northern, southern, eastern and western directions run through al-Qaryatayn.

==== Capture by the Islamic State ====
On 5 August 2015, the town was captured by Islamic State (IS) militants. al-Qaryatayn is important to ISIL because the town is one of many along the Damascus-Homs Highway. On 6 August 2015, ISIL abducted 230 civilians, including at least 60 Christians from al-Qaryatayn. ISIL later advanced even further, taking control of Mahin and Huwwarin by 8 August, thus forcing hundreds of Christians to flee persecution by the terrorist group. On 9 August 2015, the Syrian Arab Air Force (SAAF) bombed Islamic State positions in al-Qaryatayn, resulting in the death of around 30 militants as well as the destruction of seven vehicles and a rocket depot, according to government sources. Meanwhile, ISIL announced a 30-day ultimatum for the remaining Syrian officials in the city to "declare their repentance", or else their houses would be seized.

On 21 August, ISIL released images showing their demolition of the Monastery of St. Elian in al-Qaryatayn. Parts of the monastery were 1,500 years old.

==== Recapture by the Syrian Army and aftermath ====
On 3 April 2016, the Syrian Army regained control of the town from the Islamic State.

The town was reported to have been re-captured by the Islamic State on 1 October 2017.

On 21 October 2017, the Syrian army liberated Al-Qaryatayn located in Eastern Homs countryside. According to media reports, within the three weeks of ISIL occupation, 116 civilians were executed apparently because they were considered cooperating with the Syrian Government.

== See also ==
- Battle of al-Qaryatayn
- Palmyra offensive (July – August 2015)

== Bibliography ==
https://www.bible.com/bible/1/NUM.34.KJV https://wol.jw.org/en/wol/d/r1/lp-e/1200001926

- Bell, Gertrude Lowthian (1908). Syria: The Desert & The Sown. Heinemann.
- Blankinship, Khalid Yahya, ed. (1993). The History of al-Ṭabarī, Volume XI: The Challenge to the Empires. SUNY Series in Near Eastern Studies. Albany, New York: State University of New York Press. ISBN 978-0-7914-0851-3.
- Bosworth, Clifford Edmund (1980). The Encyclopaedia of Islam, new edition: Supplement. BRILL Archive. ISBN 90-04-06167-3.
- Chatty, Dawn (2006). Nomadic Societies in the Middle East and North Africa: Entering the 21st Century. BRILL. ISBN 90-04-14792-6.
- Hitti, Phillip K. (2004). History of Syria, Including Lebanon and Palestine. Gorgias Press LLC. ISBN 1-59333-119-3.
- Joseph, John (1983). Muslim-Christian Relations and Inter-Christian Rivalries in the Middle East: The Case of the Jacobites in an Age of Transition. SUNY Press. ISBN 0-87395-600-1.
- Leary, Lewis Gatson (1913). Syria: The Land of Lebanon. McBride, Nast & Company.
- Le Strange, Guy (1890). Palestine Under the Moslems: A Description of Syria and the Holy Land from A.D. 650 to 1500. Committee of the Palestine Exploration Fund.
- Necipoglu, Gulru (1996). Muqarnas-An Annual on the Visual Culture of the Islamic World. BRILL. ISBN 90-04-10633-2.
- Porter, Josias Leslie (1858). A Handbook for Travellers in Syria and Palestine. Vol. 1. Murray..
- Richards, Donald Sidney (2006). The chronicle of Ibn al-Athīr for the crusading period from al-Kāmil fī'l-ta'rīkh: The years 491-541/1097-1146 : the coming of the Franks and the Muslim response. Ashgate Publishing Ltd. ISBN 0-7546-4077-9.
- Robinson, Edward; Smith, Eli (1841). Biblical Researches in Palestine, Mount Sinai and Arabia Petraea: A Journal of Travels in the year 1838. Vol. 3. Boston: Crocker & Brewster.
