= Palmyra District =

Palmyra District منطقة تدمر Tadmor District
- District
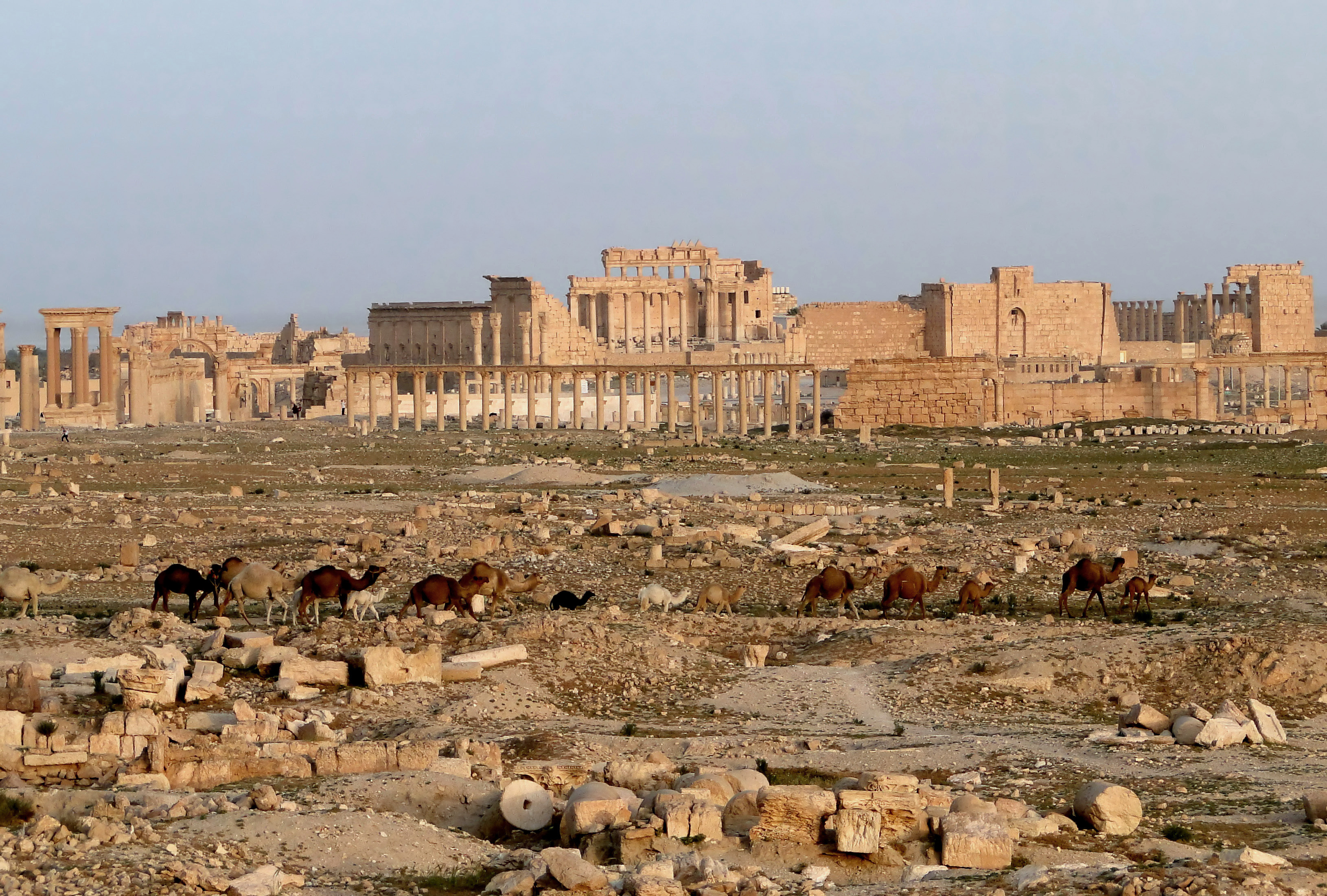
- Palmyra in 2010

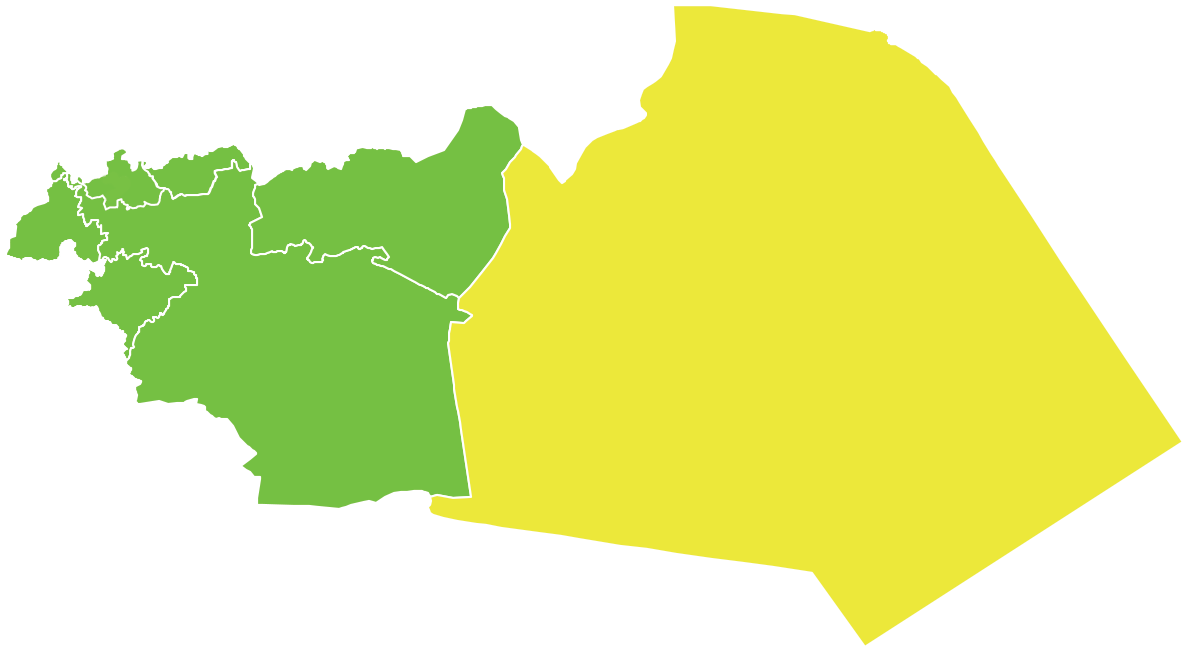
- Map of Tadmor District within Homs Governorate
- Coordinates (Palmyra): 34°36′N 38°18′E
- Country: Syria
- Governorate: Homs
- Seat: Palmyra
- Subdistricts: 2 nawāḥī

Area
  - Total: 30,823.49 km^{2} (11,901.02 sq mi)

Population (2004)
  - Total: 76,942
  - Density: 2.4962/km^{2} (6.4652/sq mi)
- Geocode: SY0405

Palmyra District or Tadmor District (Arabic: منطقة تدمر, romanized: manṭiqat Tadmor) is a district (manṭiqat) of the Homs Governorate, Syria. According to the 2004 census, the district had a population of 76,942. The district is divided into two sub-districts (nawāḥī).

== History ==
The old city of Palmyra developed as an oasis based settlement in the Neolithic period. The name "Tadmor" appears in records dating to the 19th century BCE from Kanesh. The name later appears in texts and inscriptions from Mari and during the Assyrian period. In 41 BCE, Mark Antony attacked Palmyra after it supported the Parthians against the Roman Empire. Archeological evidence revealed remains of building dated from 3rd century BCE to 1st century CE. During the first century CE, Palmyra developed into an important trading centre connecting the Roman Empire with Mesopotamia and the far east. The city became a regional power during the reign of Odaenathus before Roman Emperor Aurelian reconquered the city in 272–273 CE.

Following the Muslim conquest, Palmyra continued as a regional settlement, although its importance declined during the Middle Ages. Excavations and archeological exploration by the Europeans began in the 19th century. It was under the Ottoman Empire until the First World War, after which it came under the control of the French.

In May 2015, Islamic State captured Palmyra, resulting in the destruction of several major archaeological monuments and the execution of archeologist Khaled al-Asaad. After a brief takeover by the Syrian government forces, Islamic State retook it in December 2016. In 2017, the government forces launched a new attack and recaptured the district by August 2017. After a brief take over by the Islamic State, the government forces recaptured the district in November 2017. While the district had remained under government control, there has been clashes between the government forces and the Islamic State. The fighting caused extensive damage to infrastructure and a report recorded 651 damaged or destroyed buildings in Tadmur district in March 2016.

== Geography ==
Tadmor District is one of the six administrative districts (manṭiqat) of Homs Governorate, Syria. The district is divided into two sub-districts (nawāḥī)–Palmyra and Al-Sukhnah.

== Demographics ==
According to the 2004 census, Tadmor District had a population of 76,942, comprising 40,200 males and 36,742 females. The census recorded 13,062 households, with an average household size of 5.9 people. The illiteracy rate was 20.6% among males and 31.7% among females. About 57.2% of the population were recorded as engaged in paid work, 28.3% were self-employed and 9.4% worked without pay. Approximately 72.5% of the households were own houses.

According to the 2004 census, Tadmur subdistrict had a population of 55,062 people and Al-Sukhnah had a population of 21,880. According to the United Nations Office for the Coordination of Humanitarian Affairs report in 2024, the population was estimated to have dropped to 4,387 in Tadmur sub-district and 4,066 in Al-Sukhnah.
