= Siege of Laodicea =

Siege of Laodicea can refer to:

- Siege of Laodicea (636), capture of Laodicea in Syria (Latakia) by the Rashidun Caliphate
- Siege of Laodicea (1119), capture of Laodicea in Phrygia by the Byzantine Empire
- Siege of Laodicea (1188), capture of Laodicea in Syria (Latakia) by the Ayyubid Sultanate
- Siege of Latakia (2011), suppression of anti-government protests during the Syrian Civil War
