= Latakia Tetraporticus =

Triumphal arch in Latakia, Syria

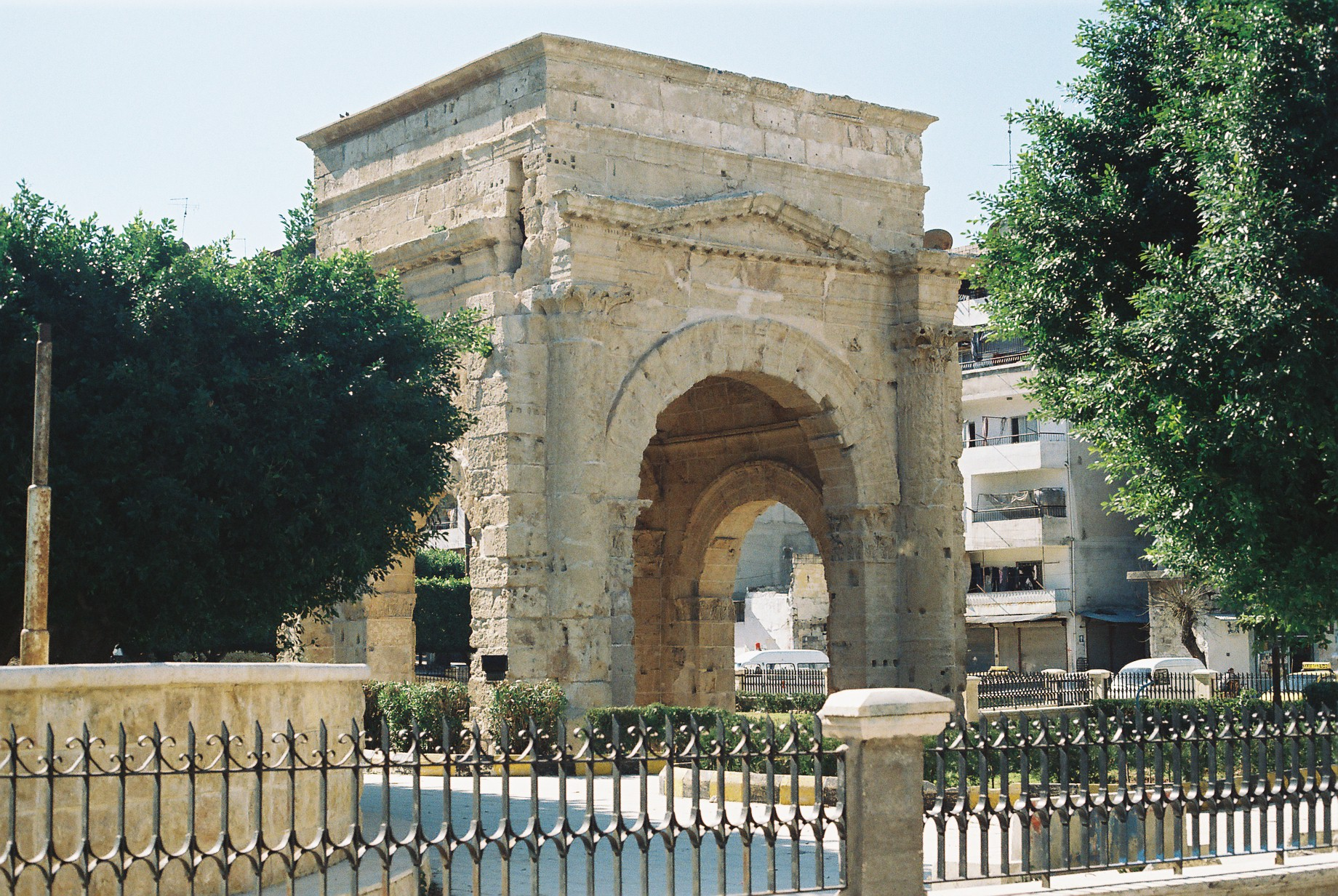
- The arch in modern day Latakia, in the center of a public park

- Location within Syria
- 35.5139°N 35.7820°E
- Type: Triumphal Arch
- Periods: Roman
- Cultures: Roman
- Location: Latakia, Syria

History
- Built: c. 183 AD
- Built by: Septimius Severus

Site notes
- Condition: intact
- Owner: Public
- Public access: Yes

The Latakia Tetraporticus, also sometimes referred to as the Triumphal Arch of Septimius Severus (Arabic: قوس النصر) is a triumphal arch located in modern-day Latakia, Syria in the south-east region of the city, in the Port Said street. Believed to be built in honour of Roman emperor Septimius Severus, the arch dates to 183 AD and is considered a symbol of the city.

== Architecture ==
The arch is from 9.1 to 12.2 metres (30 to 40 ft) high, and has four door ways. The tetrapylon would have marked the eastern end of the Roman city, as occasional Classic Roman columns litter the surrounding streets.

== Modern era ==
Its sturdy and unusual cubic shape helped its survival through the earthquakes that damaged many parts of the ancient city, and it currently stands in the center of a public park.

== See also ==
- List of Roman triumphal arches
- Laodicea in Syria
- National Museum of Latakia
