= Lake 16 Tishreen =

Lake in Latakia Governorate, Syria

- Seven Lakes, Lake Mashqita, or Lake Al-Bahluliyah
- بحيرة 16 تشرين (Arabic)
- Location within Syria
- Interactive map of Lake 16 Tishreen
- Location: Latakia Governorate
- Coordinates: 35°39′19.37″N 35°56′51.29″E
- Type: Reservoir
- Basin countries: Syria
- Max. temperature: 25.8 °C (46 °F)
- Min. temperature: 11 °C (20 °F)
- Settlements: Qesmin, Al-Kneissat, Ruwaisat Qesmin, and Al-Khabouria

Lake 16 Tishreen, also referred to as the Seven Lakes, Lake Mashqita, or Lake Al-Bahluliyah, is an artificial, branching lake created following the construction of the 16 Tishrin Dam on the Nahr al-Kabir al-Shamali in Latakia Governorate, Syria. It is considered the third-largest lake in Syria.

== Geography and ecology ==
The lake is situated in the village of Al-Bahluliyah, near Mashqita, approximately 30 kilometers from the city of Latakia. The lake derives its name from its extensive branching, which gives the impression from above that it is divided into seven parts by islands, mountains, and other natural barriers. The lake's shores are bordered by forested mountains, with small islands exhibiting red soil and comprising pine and oak trees. The region lies between the Syrian Coastal Mountain Range and the Alawite Mountains and is characterized by pine and oak forests. It receives high precipitation levels, with an annual average of approximately 1,100 mm (43 in), and exhibits a high degree of climatic and biological diversity. The lake remains relatively unpolluted due to its considerable distance from residential areas. The temperature of the lake varies between 11 and 25.8 °C (20 and 46 °F) throughout the year, with a pH range of 7.32 to 8.28.

In mid-2011, a project was initiated to restore the fish population in the lake, which had significantly declined due to overfishing over an extended period. The project was divided into three phases. The initial phase involved the release of 1,200 adult Cyprinus fish. The second phase entailed the introduction of 25,000 fingerlings, each weighing approximately 20 grams (1 oz). The third and final phase involved the release of one million larvae into the lake.

== Tourism ==
The lake is considered a tourist destination, featuring three hotels and serving as a popular spot for leisure activities. In 2006, a Kuwaiti company proposed investing in tourism projects at the lake as part of Syria's economic openness and globalization plans.

Several Syrian villages are situated near the lake, including Qesmin, Al-Kneissat, Ruwaisat Qesmin, and Al-Khabouria. The region is renowned for its cultivation of citrus fruits and vineyards.
