= Nahr al-Kabir al-Shamali =

Coordinates: 35.517778°N 35.830833°E

Nahr al-Kabir al-Shamali Arabic: النهر الكبير الشمالي, Ugaritic: 𐎗𐎈𐎁𐎐
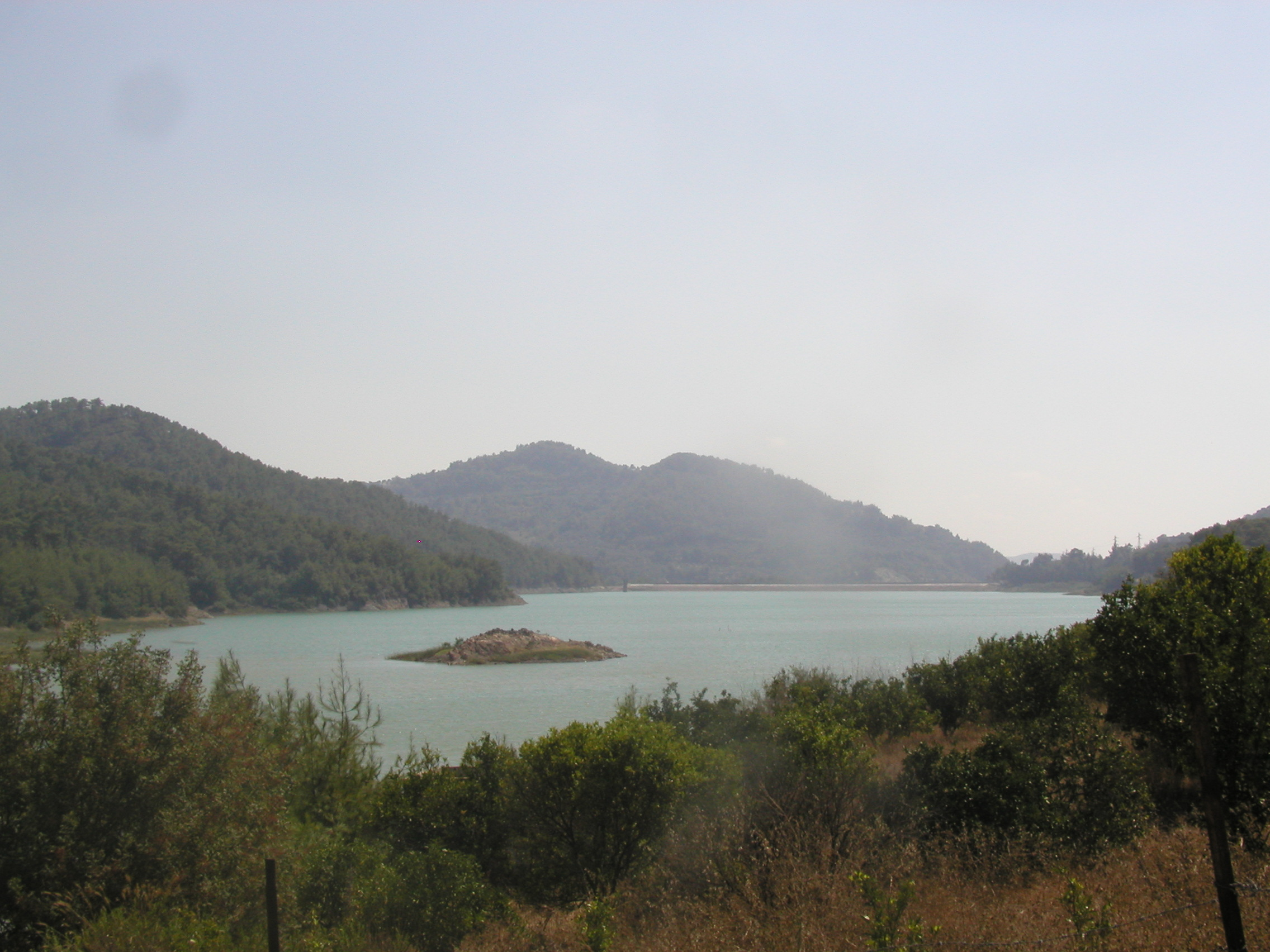
- Lake nestled within the river, 2004

- Location within Syria

Location
- Country: Syria

Physical characteristics
- Source: Syrian Coastal Mountain Range
  - location: Latakia Governorate, Syria
  - elevation: 1,100 m (3,600 ft)
- Mouth: south of Latakia
- Length: 56 km (35 mi)
- Basin size: 1,103.63 km^{2} (426.11 sq mi)
- Discharge
  - average: 40 m^{3}/s (1,400 cu ft/s)

The Nahr al-Kabir al-Shamali (Arabic: النهر الكبير الشمالي, lit. 'the northern great river', Ugaritic: 𐎗𐎈𐎁𐎐, rḥbn, in contrast with the Nahr al-Kabir al-Janoubi, lit. 'the southern great river) is a river in Latakia Governorate, Syria.

== History ==
During Ugarit period, the river was known as "Raḥbānu".

== Course ==
Al-Kabir al-Shamali river rises in the Syrian Coastal Mountain Range, north western Syria at the Turkish borders, and runs through a plain area to the south west to finally flow into the Mediterranean Sea south of Latakia.

== Dams ==
- 16 Tishreen dam, built to be used in power generation, storage of rain and river water, and the creation of Mashqita lake for fishing and tourism.
- Baradun Dam, is another dam under construction on the river to the north of the previous one. However, the construction was halted during the Syrian Civil War.
