= Ziad Abdullah =

Syrian film critic and author

- Born: 20 August 1975 (age 51); Latakia, Syria
- Occupations: Novelist, poet and film critic
- Writing career
- Genres: Fiction, poetry, and films
- Notable works: Bur Dubai (novel), A Little Before Ink (2000)

Ziad Abdullah (Arabic: زياد عبدالله) is a Syrian film critic, author and screenwriter.

== Early life and career ==
Ziad Abdullah was born on 20 August 1975 in Latakia. He studied English literature at Tishreen University, Latakia. Since 1995 he has been publishing poetry, articles and translations. In 2000 after completing his graduation he moved to Dubai, United Arab Emirates and founded Oxygen, an online cultural magazine in Arabic Language.

From 2005 to 2012 as a film critic, he reviewed many films from the international arena of the Arab cinema world. During this period, he also wrote for journals and magazines such as Al Akhbar, Al Hayat, Al Bayan, Alaraby, and Al Faisal, and was also a jury member of the Al Khaleej Film Festival 2007. He founded Oxygen magazine in 2005.

In 2011, Ziad joined Dubai International Film Festival as a programmer and developing manager and worked on the project Top 100 Arabic Films (DIFF). Since 2016 he has been working with the Sharjah Art Foundation.

As a columnist, Ziad also contributes in notable news papers such as The New Arab, Al Akhbar (Lebanon), Al-Hayat and Emarat Al Youm,

== Filmography ==
As a screenwriter Ziad wrote story of American educational children's television series Sesame Street and Beep (short film 2011) which was also selected for Oran International Arabic Film Festival.

== Bibliography ==
=== Poetry ===
- A Little Before Ink (2000)
- Angels of Highways (2005)

=== Novels and short stories ===
- Bur Dubai (2008)
- Dynamite (2012)
- The Strange Chronicles of The Half-Named Man (Collection of short stories 2016)
- Dogs of Liberated Zones (Novel 2017)

=== Translations ===
- Burning in Water, Drowning in Flame by Charles Bukowski (2016)
- Ways of Seeing by John Berger (2017)

=== Edited books ===
- The Color Purple, by Alice Walker (2018)
- Possessing the Secret of Joy, by Alice Walker (2018)
- Save Me the Waltz by Zelda Fitzgerald (2018)
- Oracle Nights by Paul Auster (2018)

== Critic ==
- Cinema of Passion (Dubai International Film Festival's Top 100 Arabic Films 2016)
- Islam and Laughter (2018)
