= Latakia =

City in Syria

Latakia اللَّاذِقِيَّة
- City
- Lattakia
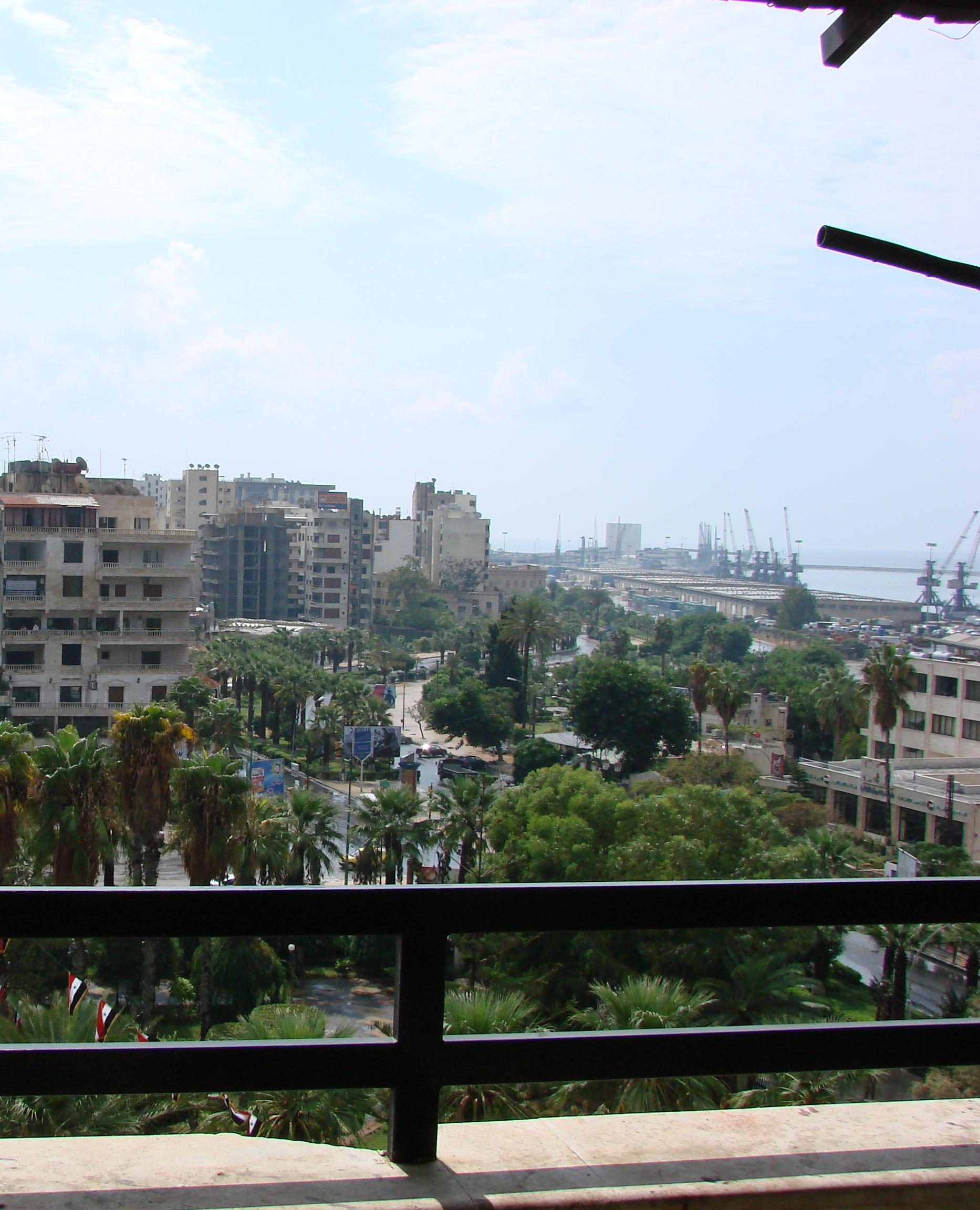
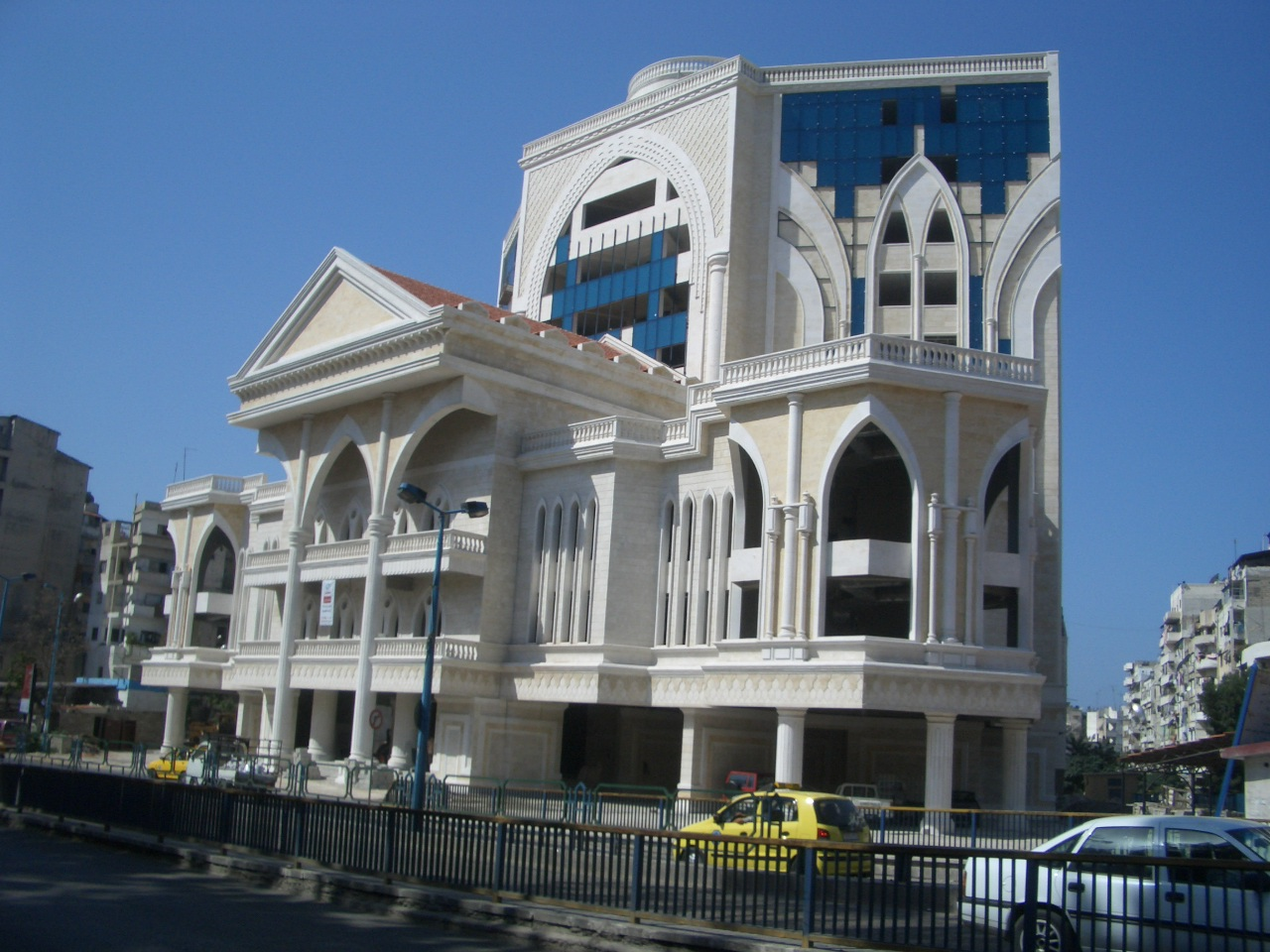
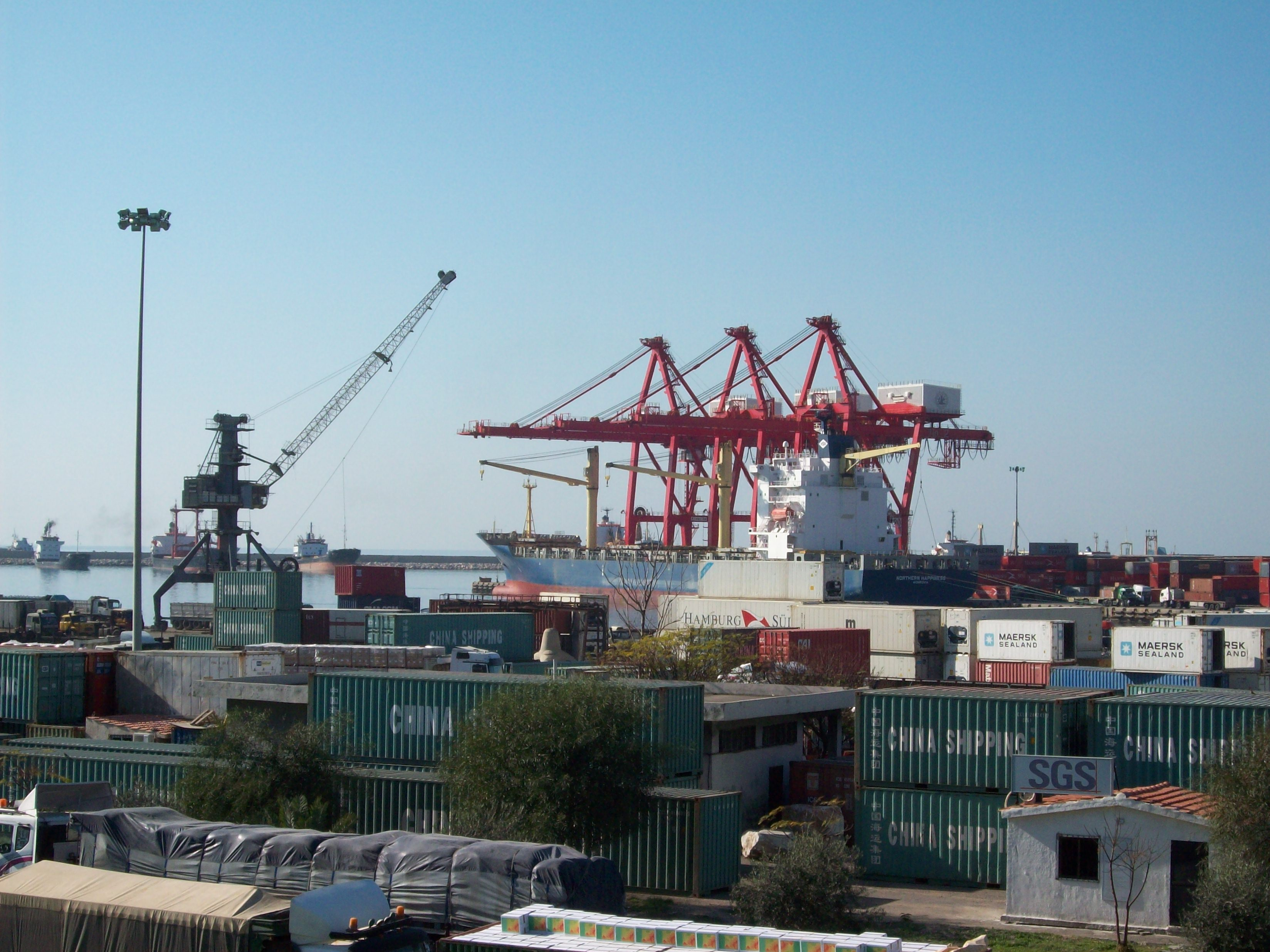
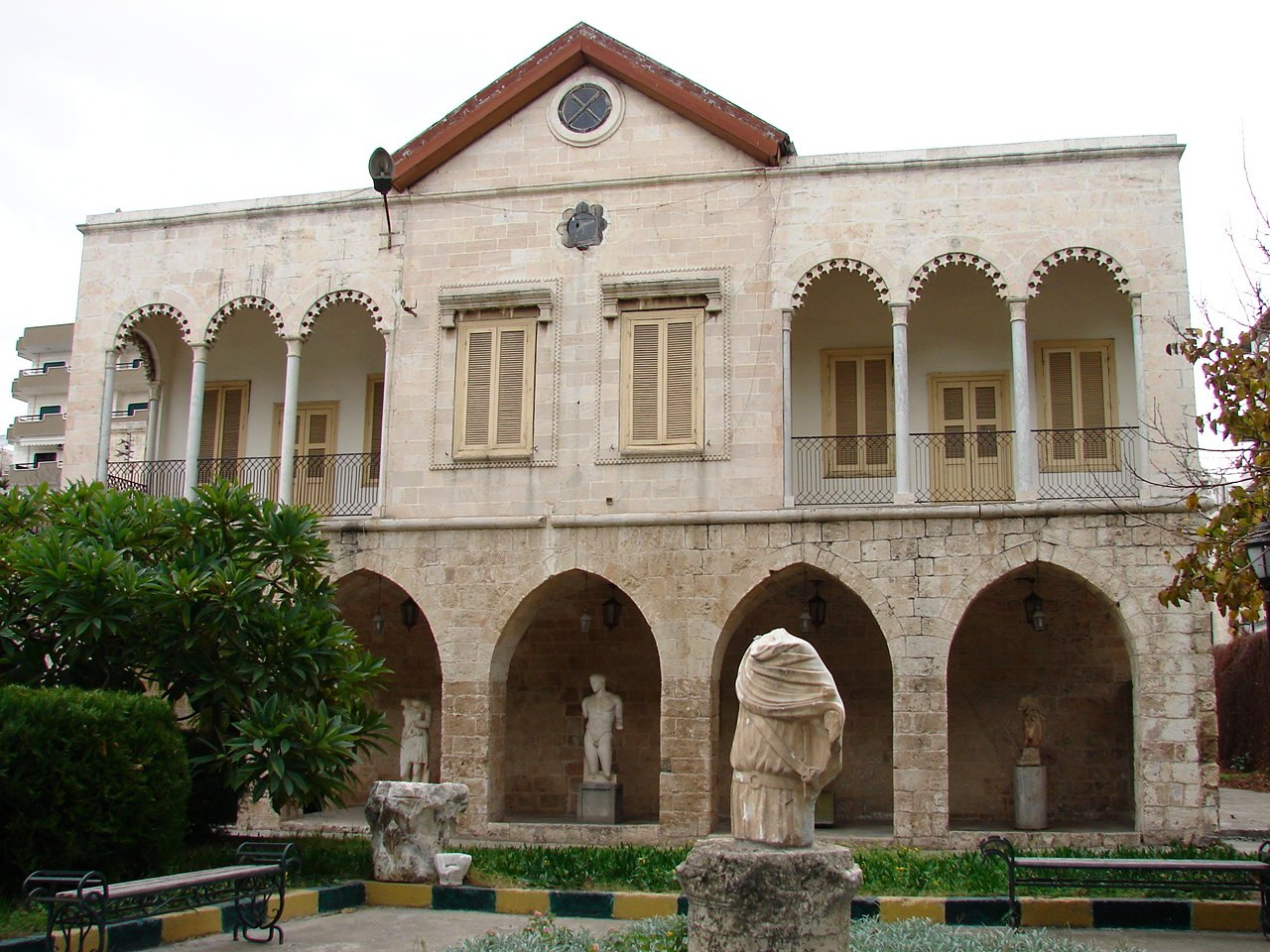
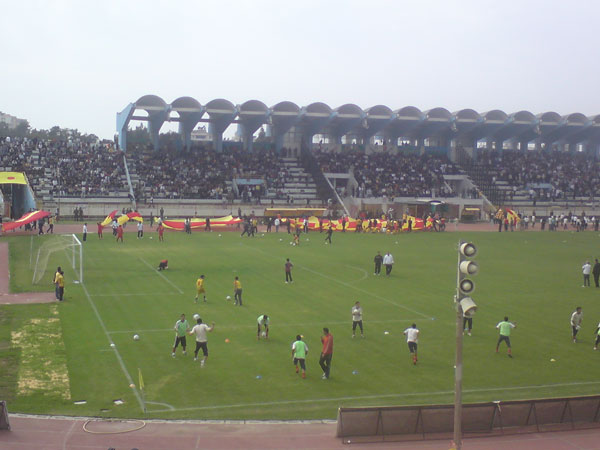
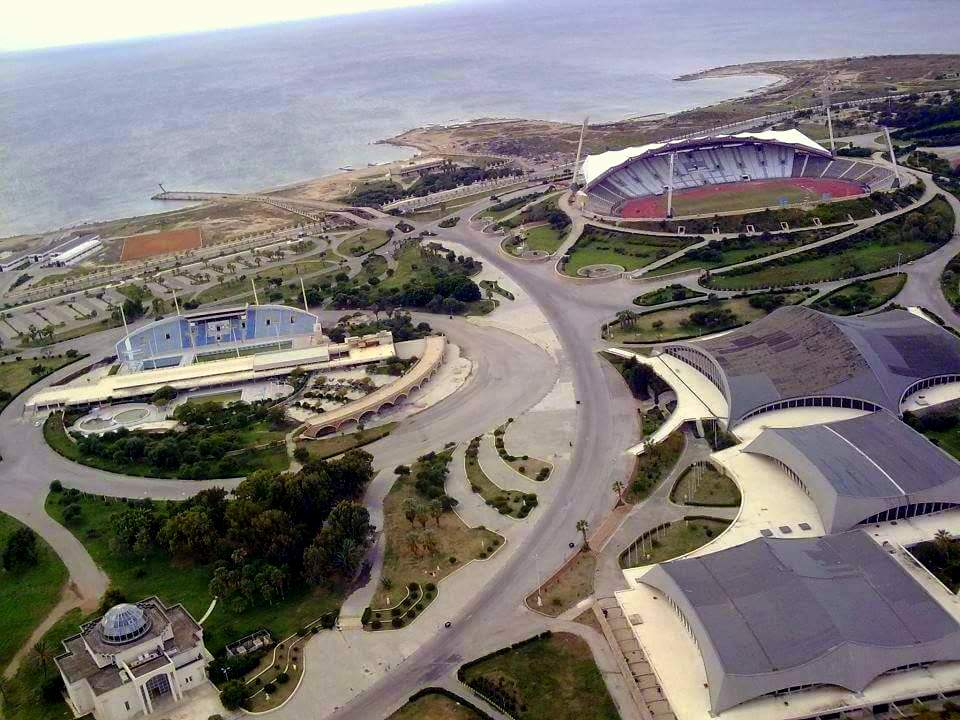
- Downtown view The governor's palace Port of Latakia National Museum of Latakia Latakia Municipal Stadium Latakia Sports City

- Coat of arms
- Nickname: "Bride of the Mediterranean"
- Interactive map of Latakia
- Location of Latakia within Syria Latakia (Eastern Mediterranean) Latakia (Asia)
- Coordinates: 35°31′12″N 35°46′41″E
- Country: Syria
- Governorate: Latakia Governorate
- District: Latakia District
- Subdistrict: Latakia Subdistrict
- Founded: 4th Century BC
- Founder: King Seleucus I Nicator
- Named for: Laodice of Macedonia

Area
  - Land: 58 km^{2} (22 sq mi)
  - Metro: 108 km^{2} (42 sq mi)
- Elevation: 11 m (36 ft)

Population (2023 Estimate)
  - City: 709,000
  - Density: 12,000/km^{2} (32,000/sq mi)
  - Metro: 709,000
  - Metro density: 6,560/km^{2} (17,000/sq mi)
- Demonym(s): Arabic: لاذقاني, romanized: Lāḏiqāniyy
- Time zone: UTC+3 (AST)
- Area codes: Country code: 963; City code: 41
- Geocode: C3480
- Climate: Csa
- International airport: Latakia International Airport

Latakia (/lætəˈkiːə/; Arabic: اللَّاذِقِيَّة, romanized: al-Lāḏiqiyya; Syrian pronunciation: [el.laːdˈʔɪjje]), officially Lattakia, is the principal port city of Syria and capital city of the Latakia Governorate located on the Mediterranean coast. Historically, it has also been known as Laodicea in Syria or Laodicea ad Mare. In addition to serving as a port, the city is a significant manufacturing center for surrounding agricultural towns and villages. According to a 2023 estimate, the population of the city is 709,000, its population greatly increased as a result of the Syrian Revolution, which led to an influx of internally displaced persons from rebel held areas. It is the 5th-largest city in Syria after Aleppo, Damascus, Homs and Hama. Cape Apostolos Andreas, the north-eastern tip of Cyprus, is about 109 kilometres (68 mi) away.

Although the site of the city has been inhabited since the 2nd millennium BC, the city was founded as a Greek city in the 4th century BC under the rule of the Greek Seleucid Empire. Latakia was subsequently ruled by the Romans and Byzantines, followed by the Rashiduns, Umayyads and Abbasids during the 7th–10th centuries AD. Byzantine ruling groups frequently attacked the city, periodically recapturing it before losing it again to Arab powers, particularly the Fatimids. Afterward, Latakia was ruled successively by the Seljuk Turks, Crusaders, Ayyubids, Mamluks, and the Ottomans. Following World War I, Latakia was assigned to the French mandate of Syria, in which it served as the capital of the autonomous territory of the Alawites. This autonomous territory became the Alawite State in 1922, proclaiming its independence a number of times until reintegrating into Syria in 1944.

== Etymology ==
Like many Greek Seleucid cities, Latakia was named after a member of the ruling dynasty. It was first called Laodikeia on the Coast (Greek: Λαοδίκεια ἡ Πάραλος) by Seleucus I Nicator in honor of his mother, Laodice. In Latin, its name became Laodicea ad Mare. The original name survives in its Arabic form as al-Lāḏiqiyya (Arabic: اللاذقية), from which the French Lattaquié and English Latakia (or Lattakia) derive. To the Ottomans, it was known as Lazkiye.

== History ==
=== Ancient settlement and founding ===
The location of Latakia, the Ras Ziyarah promontory, has a long history of occupation. The Phoenician city of Ramitha was located here. Stephanus of Byzantium writes that the city was named Ramitha (Ancient Greek: Ῥάμιθα), then Leukê Aktê ("white coast") (Ancient Greek: Λευκὴ ἀκτή) and later Laodicea (Ancient Greek: Λαοδίκεια).

The city was described in Strabo's Geographica:

It is a city most beautifully built, has a good harbour, and has territory which, besides its other good crops, abounds in wine. Now this city furnishes the most of the wine to the Alexandreians, since the whole of the mountain that lies above the city and is possessed by it is covered with vines almost as far as the summits. And while the summits are at a considerable distance from Lāŏdĭcḗa, sloping up gently and gradually from it, they tower above Apameia, extending up to a perpendicular height.

=== Roman rule ===
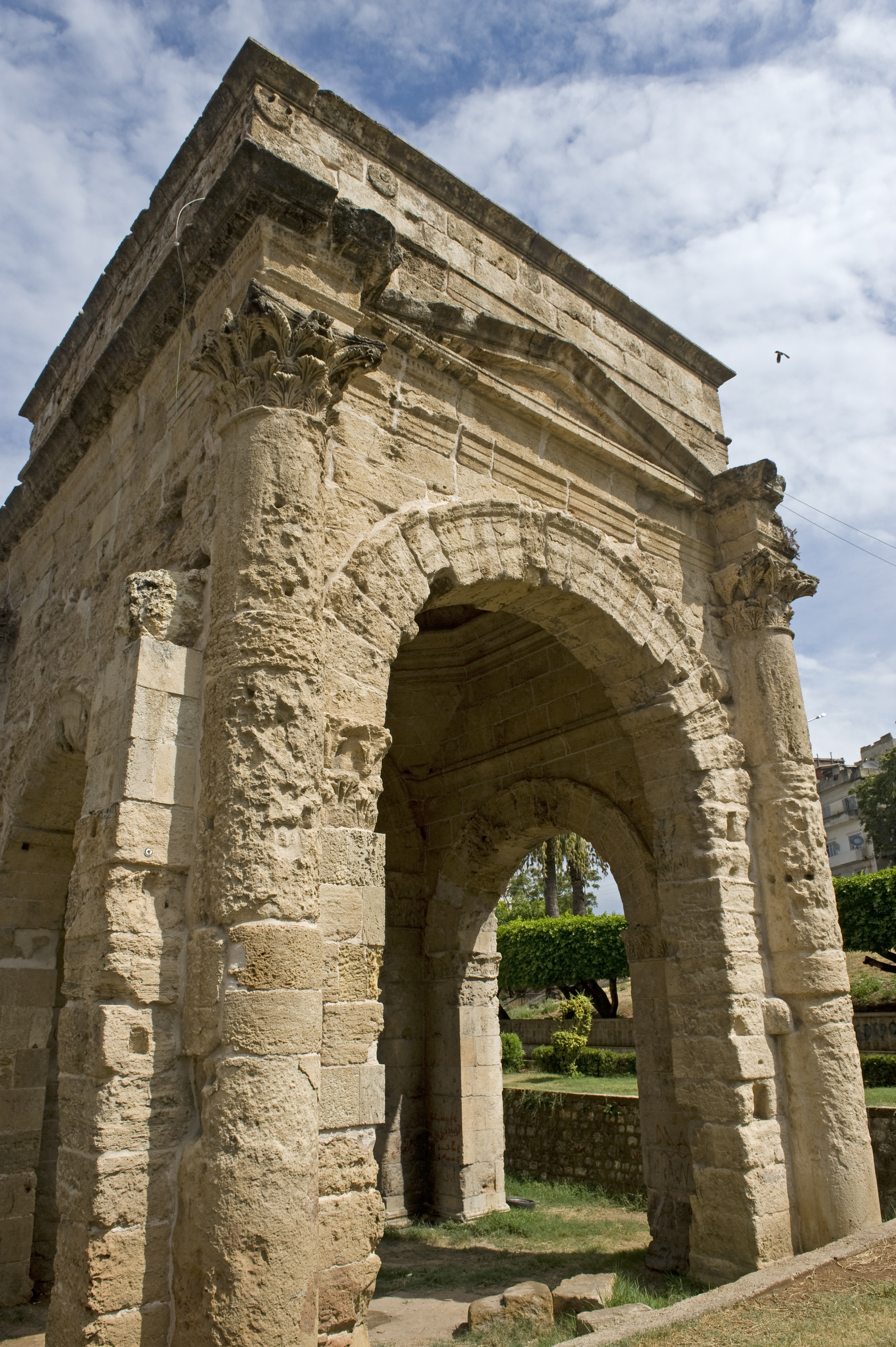
Latakia Tetraporticus, built by Septimius Severus in AD 193

Pompey the Great conquered the city along with most of Syria in the 1st century BC, and Julius Caesar declared the city a "free polis." The Roman emperor Septimius Severus rewarded the city with the title of "Metropolis" in the 2nd century AD, exempted it of the empire's taxation, fortified the city, made it for a few years the capital of Roman Syria and also built the city's famed Tetraporticus around the same time. Some Roman merchants moved to live in the city under Augustus, but the city was always culturally "Greek" influenced. Subsequently, a Roman road was built from southern Anatolia toward Berytus and Damascus, that greatly improved the commerce through the port of Laodicea.

The heretic Apollinarius was bishop of Lāŏdĭcḗa in the 4th century. The city minted coins from an early date, but decreasing in importance after the cities of Alexandria and Antioch flourished in coin minting and overshadowed other cities.

The city was also famed for its wine produced around the port's hills which were exported to all the empire.

During the split of the Roman Empire, it belonged to the Eastern Roman Empire. An earthquake damaged the city in 494, but the city was later reconstructed by Justinian I and made the capital of the Eastern Roman province of Theodorias from 528 AD until Muslim conquest around 637 AD.

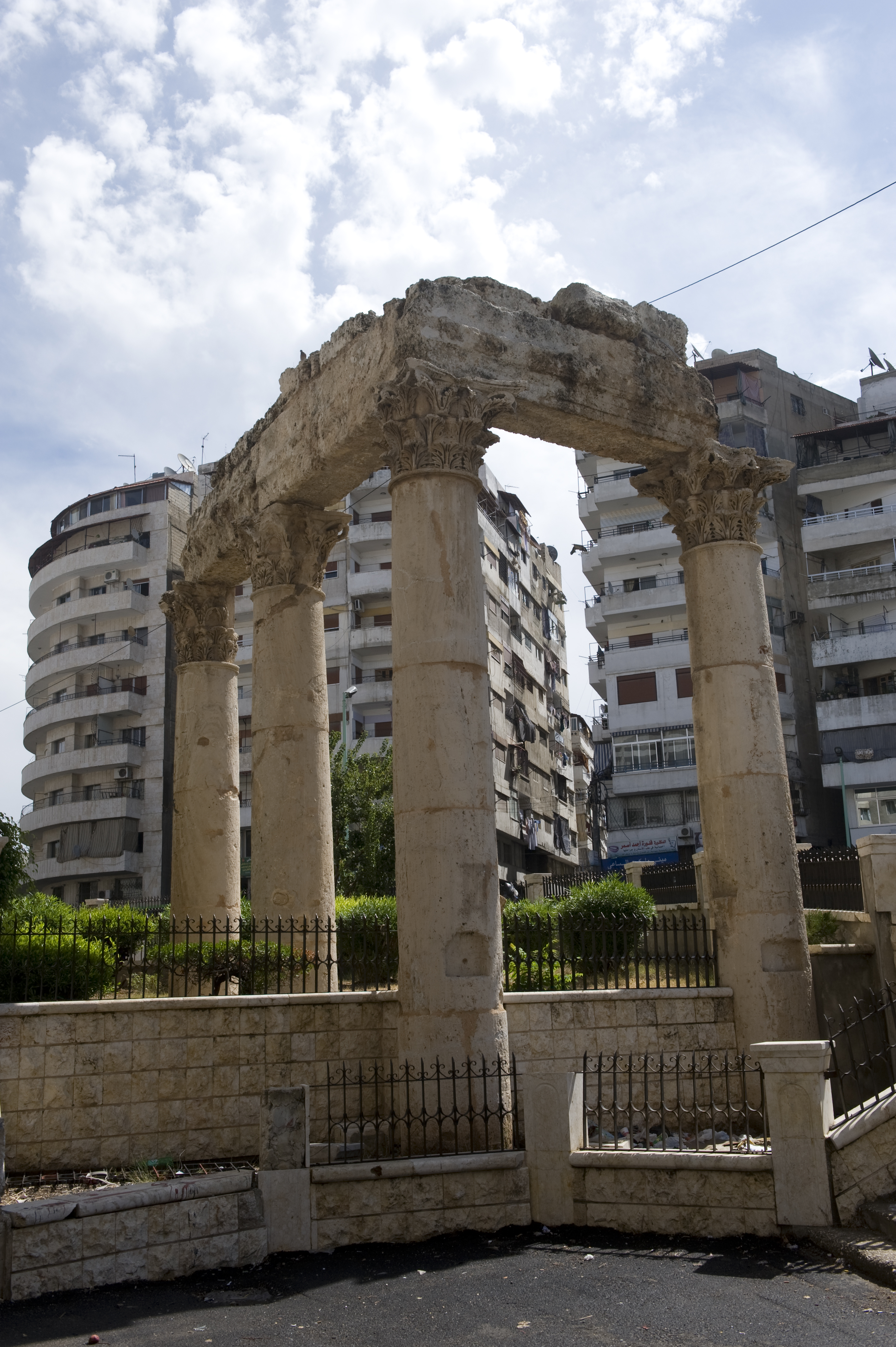
Ruins of the Temple of Bacchus in Latakia

=== Early Islamic era ===
All of Syria, including the Roman province of Theodorias and its capital, Laodicea fell into Muslim rule after being attacked by a caliphate general, named 'Ubadah ibn al-Samit during the Muslim conquest of Syria in the 7th century. The city was renamed al-Lāḏiqiyya (اللَّاذِقِيَّة) and switched rule from the Rashidun Caliphate, to the Umayyad Caliphate and finally to the Abbasid Caliphate in a span of 9 centuries, attached to the large province of Bilad al-Sham (Greater Syria). Arab geographer, Al-Muqaddasi (d. 991), mentions Latakia as belonging to the district of Hims (Homs).

=== Crusader, Ayyubid, and Mamluk rule ===
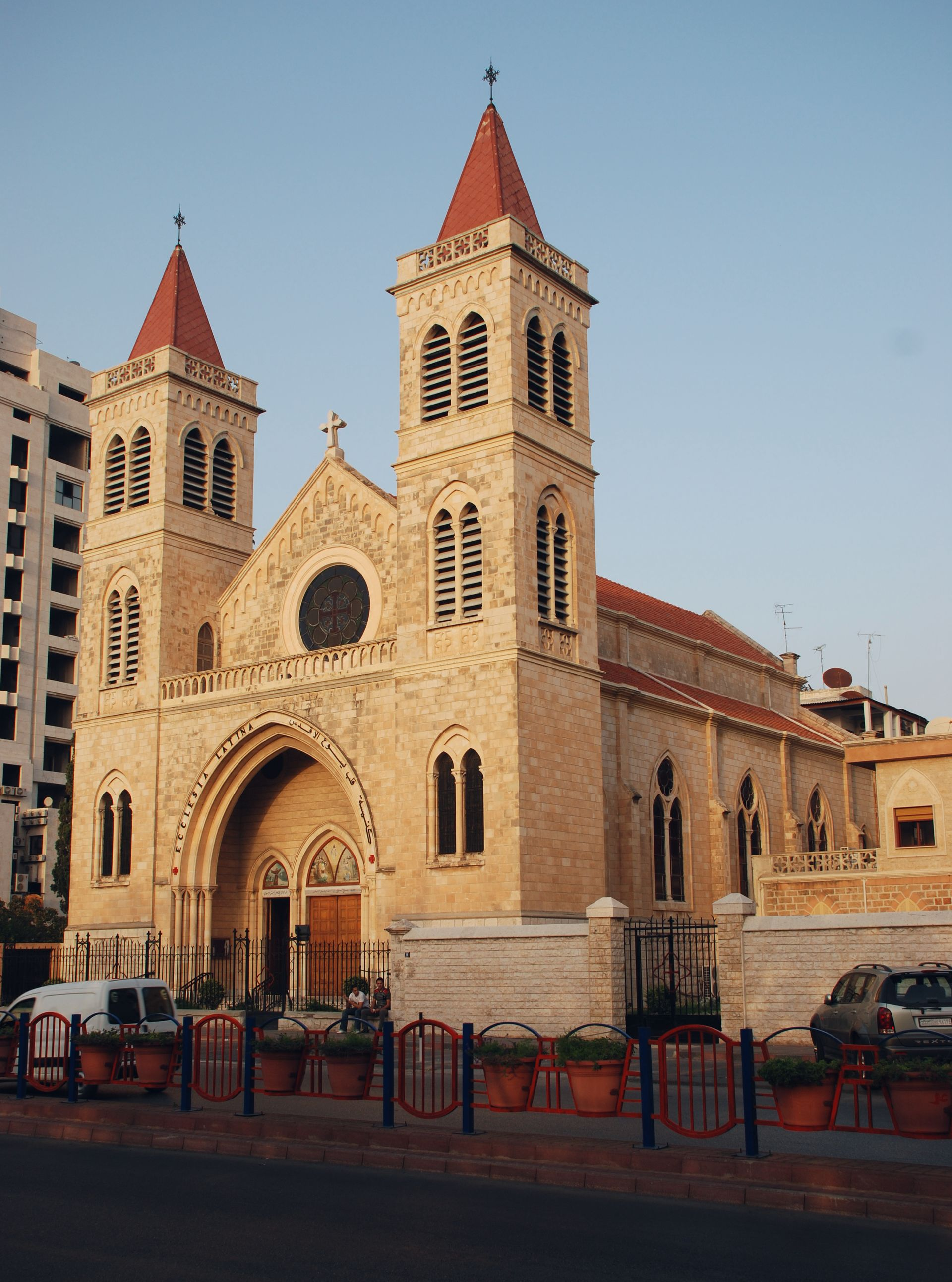
The Latin Church of Latakia, also known as the Church of the Sacred Heart of Jesus

The Mardaites controlled the region from Jebel Aqra to northern Palestine, including Latakia in 705. However, they later withdrew from the city after an agreement with the Umayyad caliph Al-Walid I. Afterwards, the Mardaites sacked it in 719, but it was rebuilt by Umar II. The city lost its importance due to its location on the border between the Byzantine Empire and the Abbasid Caliphate from 750 to 968. The famous poet Al-Mutanabbi led a millenarian revolt at Latakia in 930. The Byzantine Empire recaptured the city in 970 by John I Tzimiskes, but it was lost to the Fatimids in 980. The Banu Munqidh managed to control the city until they were succeeded by the Seljuks during the reign of Malik-Shah I in 1086, despite a brief Byzantine control in 1074. Later on, Guynemer of Boulogne raided the city on 19 August 1097, with 28 ships coming from Cyprus during the First Crusade. In 1098, Raymond of Saint-Gilles captured the city, with the Byzantine fleet presence; hence, the city became contested between the crusaders and the Byzantines who controlled Latakia and Baniyas in the meantime.

After failed efforts by Bohemond I of Antioch to capture Latakia from the Byzantine Empire in 1099, and a brief control of the Genoese fleet in 1101, the city was taken in 1103 by forces under the command of Tancred of Hauteville, a veteran of the First Crusade and acting regent of the Principality of Antioch. Following the defeat of Antiochene forces at the Battle of Harran in 1104, the city was reoccupied by the Byzantines led by Admiral Cantacuzenus, however they would again lose the city. Despite a treaty in 1108 with Bohemond promising to return Latakia to the Byzantine Empire by 1110 it was firmly under the control of the Principality of Antioch, as it was called "La Liche". In 1126, the cities of Latakia and Jabala were the dowry of Princess Alice, daughter of King Baldwin II of Jerusalem, who later donated a house in Latakia to the Knights Hospitaller, which became their main base in the region. In April 1136, the city was sacked by Sawar, governor of Aleppo, then it was struck by the 1157 Hama earthquake and the 1170 Syria earthquake.

This situation remained the same with the city serving as the primary port for the Principality until it was captured following a siege by the Ayyubids, under the rule of Saladin on 23 July 1188. By 1260, the crusaders recaptured the city, until they were defeated by the Mamluks of Qalawun, on 20 April 1287.

In circa 1300, Arab geographer al-Dimashqi noted that Latakia had no running water and that trees were scarce, but the city's port was "a wonderful harbor... full of large ships". In 1332, the Moroccan traveller Ibn Battuta visited Latakia in his journeys.

During the late 14th and 15th century, Venetians had a consul in Latakia, due to the trade of cotton and silk from Persia. The city which was in disrepair was rebuilt after a visit by Qaitbay in 1477.

An Alawite community was first established in Latakia by the missionary Abu Sa'id al-Tabarani (d. 1034) in the early 11th century. From then on it spread northward and into the coastal mountain range.

=== Ottoman rule ===
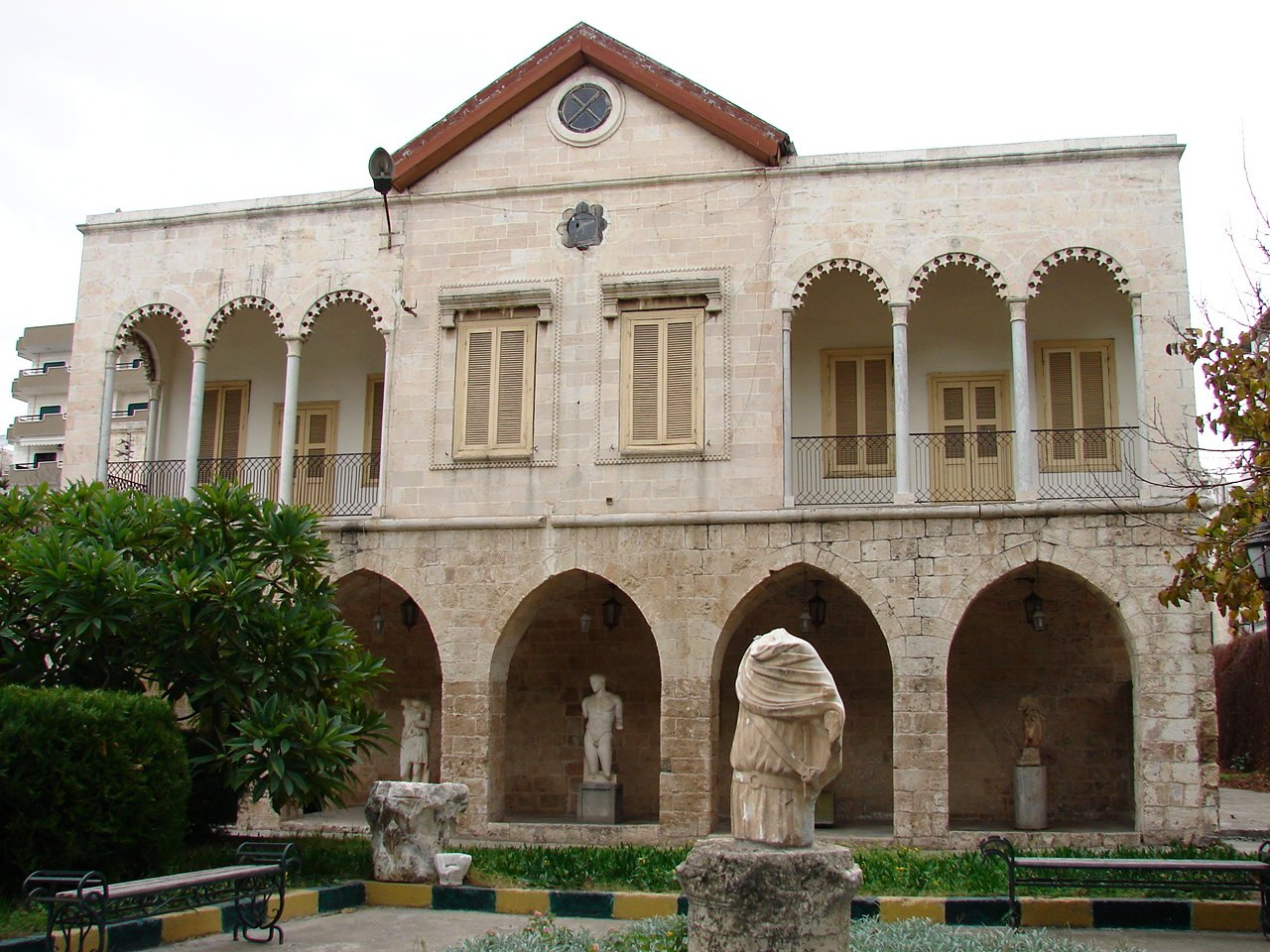
The National Museum of Latakia, a previous Ottoman era khan

Latakia came under the Ottoman control after the Battle of Marj Dabiq in 1516. It had a population of about 1400–1700 in the 16th century. From the late 17th century onward it was ruled by the Ibn al-Matarji family, some of whose members would go on to become governors of Damascus Eyalet. Under their leadership, and the development of the tobacco industry in the same period, the town developed rapidly in the 18th century. Several churches were rebuilt or restored and the Azm family of governors established several new foundations in the city. The British, French and Spanish established consulates in the city, so that by mid-century Latakia was serving as co-capital of the entire province (eyalet) of Tripoli, Lebanon.

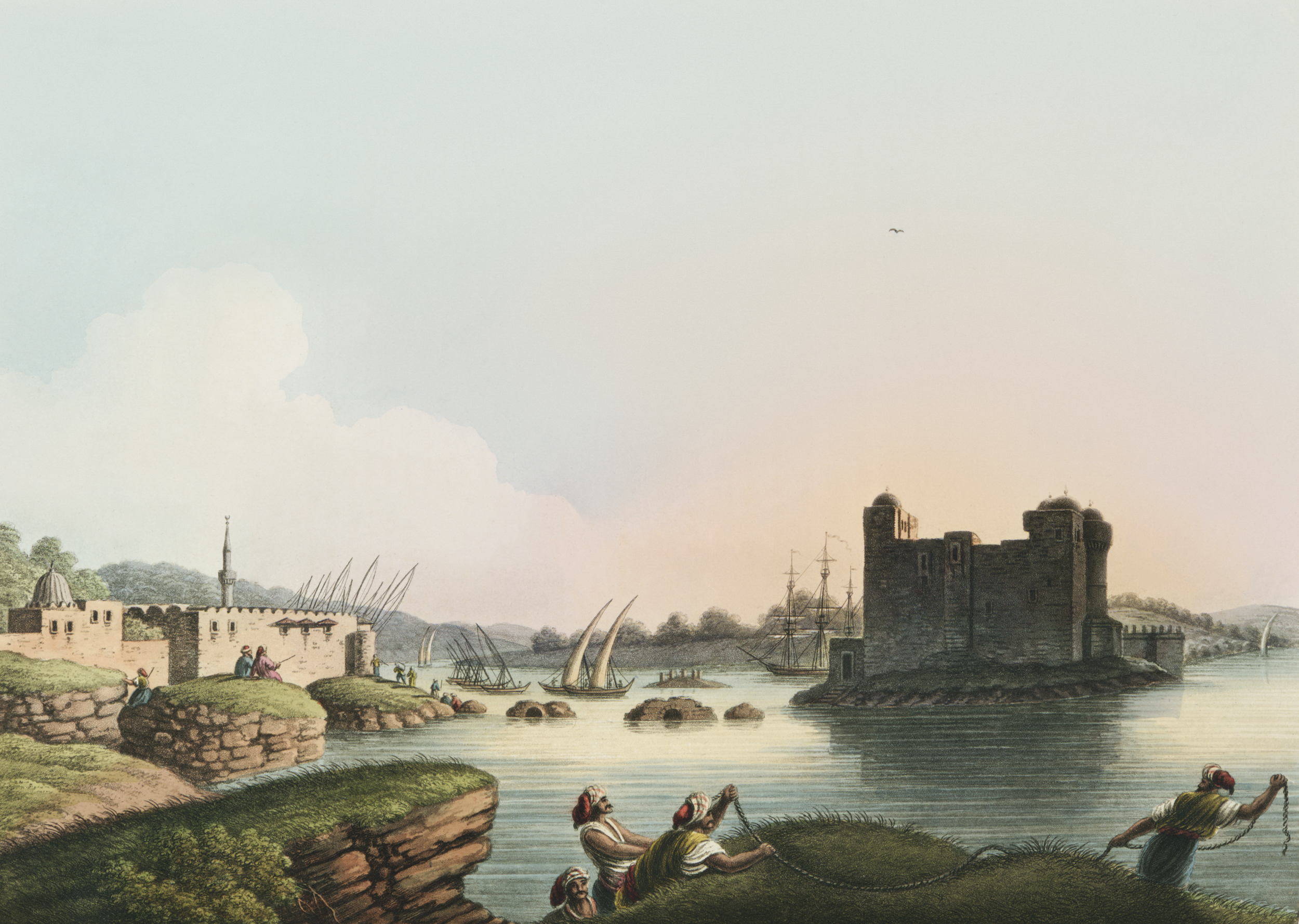
Port of Latakia, painted by Luigi Mayer (1810)

In 1824, the Ottomans named Muhammad Paşa ibn Alman, a native of the area who was suspected of being an Alawite and a French sympathizer, governor of Latakia. He was killed in an urban revolt later that year that was inspired by the fundamentalist shaykh Muhammad al-Moghrabi. During the Egyptian occupation of Syria (1831–1841) there was a major Alawite revolt (1834-1835) in both the town and the surrounding countryside.

In 1888, when Wilayat Beirut was established, Latakia became its northernmost town.

In the Ottoman period, the region of Latakia became predominantly Alawi. The Turkmen also consisted a significant minority. The city itself, however, contained significant numbers of Sunni and Christian inhabitants. The landlords in the countryside tended to be Sunni and Orthodox Christians, while the peasants were mostly Alawi. Like the Druzes, who also had a special status before the end of World War I, the Alawis had a strained relationship with the Ottoman overlords. In fact, they were not even given the status of millet, although they enjoyed relative autonomy.

=== French Mandate period ===
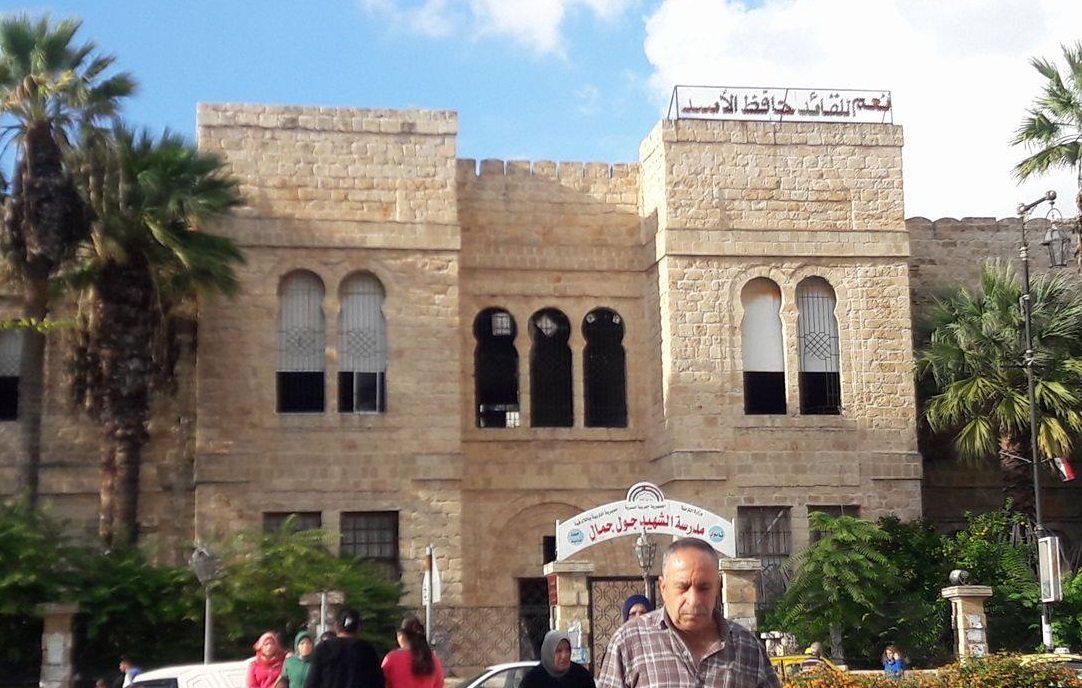
One of the oldest schools in Latakia was previous mandatory-era barracks, and later school. It was subsequently named after Jules Jammal and known ever since as the 'Jules Jammal School'

In 1920, Latakia fell under the French mandate, under which the Alawite State was established. The state was named after the locally-dominant Alawites and became a French mandate territory after World War I. The French Mandate from the League of Nations began in 1920. The creation of the Alawite State, as well as the other states of Syria under the French Mandate, has often been interpreted as a "divide and rule" strategy by the French, who sought to undermine anti-colonial nationalist movements. The French justified the creation of the Alawite state by citing the "backwardness" of the mountain-dwellers, religiously distinct from the surrounding Sunni population; they claimed that the division protected the Alawi people from more-powerful Sunni majorities.

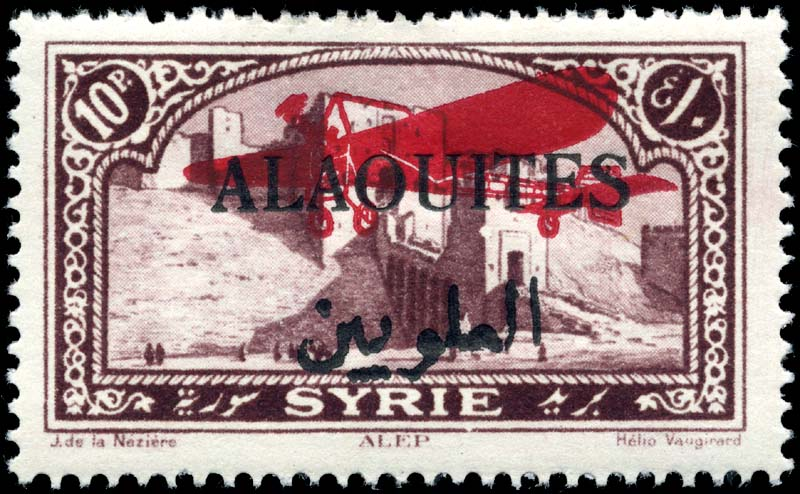
A 10-piastre stamp of Syria used in the Alawite State

This division by the French administration in Syria did not stop Alawites such as Sheikh Saleh al-Ali, who led the Syrian Revolt of 1919, in continuing to protest French rule. Saleh al-Ali coordinated with the leaders of other anti-French revolts in the country, including the revolt of Ibrahim Hananu in the Aleppo countryside and Subhi Barakat's revolt in Antioch, but Saleh al-Ali's revolt was put down in 1921. A French court-martial in Latakia sentenced Shaykh Saleh to death in absentia and offered a reward of 100,000 francs for information on his whereabouts. After the French gave up trying to capturing Shaykh Saleh, a pardon was issued by General Henri Gouraud.

The state became part of the Syrian Federation in 1922, but it left the federation again in 1924. In 1930, the Alawite State was renamed as the Government of Latakia, the only concession by the French to Arab nationalists until 1936. On 3 December 1936, it was decided that the Alawite state would be re-incorporated into Syria as a concession by the French to the Nationalist Bloc, which was the ruling party of the semi-autonomous Syrian government; the decision went into effect in 1937.

There was a great deal of Alawite separatist sentiment in the region, but their political views could not be coordinated into a unified voice. There was also a great deal of factionalism amongst the Alawite tribes, and the Alawite State was incorporated into Syria with little organised resistance.

In 1942, the Latakia and Druze regions were returned to Syrian control, and by 1946, the French completely left Syria and a new independent government was created.

=== Modern era ===
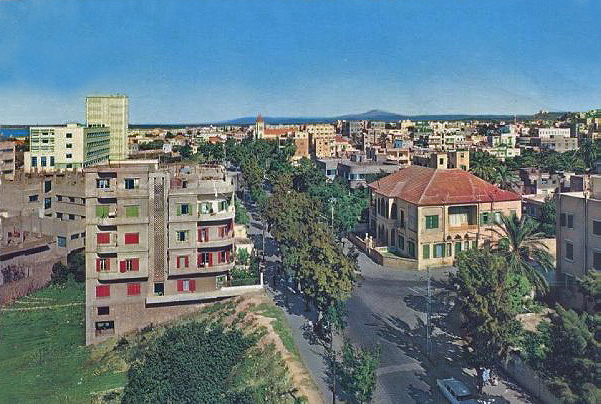
Latakia in 1970

All but a few classical buildings had been destroyed by the modern era, often by earthquakes; those remaining include a Roman triumphal arch and Corinthian columns known as the Colonnade of Bacchus. However, important remains from the city at Roman and Hellenistic periods including full body statues, Roman funerary art, and column capitals that once belonged to the ancient city, now found in its national museum.

An extensive port project was proposed in 1948, and construction work began on the Port of Latakia in 1950, aided by a US$6 million loan from Saudi Arabia. By 1951, the first stage of its construction was completed, and the port handled an increasing amount of Syria's overseas trade.

In August 1957, 4,000 Egyptian troops landed in Latakia under orders from Gamal Abdel Nasser after Turkish troops massed along the border with Syria, accusing it of harboring Turkish Communists.

A major highway linked Latakia with Aleppo and the Euphrates valley starting in 1968, supplemented by the completion of a railway line to Homs. The port became even more important after 1975 due to the troubled situation in Lebanon and the loss of Beirut and Tripoli as functioning ports.

In 1973, during the October War (Yom Kippur War), the naval Battle of Latakia between Israel and Syria was fought just offshore from the city. The battle was the first to be fought using missiles and ECM (electronic countermeasures).

On 2 September 1979 clashes broke out following the assassination of an Alawite religious leader in the city. The following day 2,000 paratroopers, commanded by Rifaat al-Assad, were sent to restore order. In the violence that followed around forty people were killed including ten pilots from the Latakia air base.

In 1987, the city hosted the tenth round of the Mediterranean Games, with the opening ceremony hosted by Hafez al-Assad in the Latakia Sports City, a sports complex designed specifically to host the games. The Latakia Sports City Stadium served as the main venue for the games.

In 1994, the city's population reached 303,000, with that number significantly rising to 383,786 by 2004. Although population assessment in recent years has become difficult due to the ongoing civil war, the city's population is estimated to have risen drastically in the 2010s due to the influx of refugees from the cities of Aleppo, Idlib and other cities which have been affected by the ongoing war.

==== Syrian Civil War ====
During the Syrian Civil War, Latakia had been a site of protest activity since March 2011. The Syrian government claimed 12 were killed there in clashes in late March, leading to the deployment of the military to restrict movement into and out of the city. Hundreds of Syrians were reportedly arrested, and by late July, activists in Latakia were telling foreign media they feared a more violent crackdown was coming. Protests continued despite the increased security presence and arrests. Several civilians were allegedly killed in confrontations with security officers during this early period of the siege. On 13 August 2011, the Syrian Army and Syrian Navy launched an operation where more than 20 tanks and APCs rolled into the Alawi stronghold. The city was also attacked by the Syrian army on 14 August 2011. Activists claimed that 25 people died during the attack.

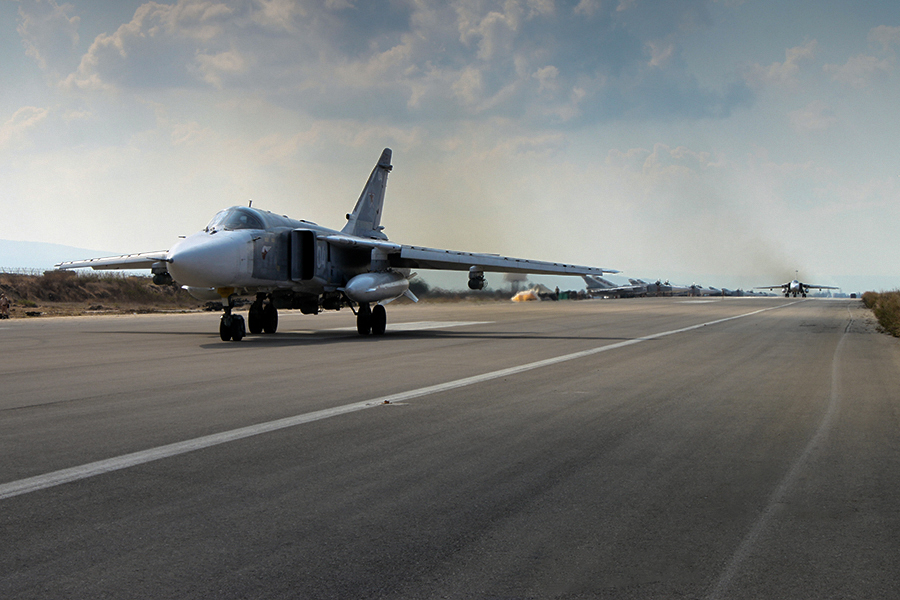
A Russian military aircraft in Khmeimim Air Base, one of Russia's main bases of operation in Syria

Latakia is the home of Russia's largest foreign SIGINT facility. Khmeimim Air Base is an airbase near Latakia converted to use by the Russian military in 2015.

Russian president Vladimir Putin, accompanied by his Syrian counterpart Bashar al-Assad visited the Khmeimim airbase, Russia's main military base in Syria, located just outside Latakia near Jableh on 11 December 2017. Declaring victory over ISIL, and announcing a partial military withdrawal from Syria, but with continuing Russian presence, as the Khmeimim airbase and the Russian naval facility in Tartus would still be operated by Russian forces.

On 7 December 2021, Israeli warplanes launched an airstrike attack on Latakia's port, damaging the port's facilities and setting several containers on fire. On 28 December, the port was attacked again after Israeli forces launched several precision missiles targeting the port. The attack killed 2 Syrian Army soldiers, destroyed several containers and set the port on fire for several hours.

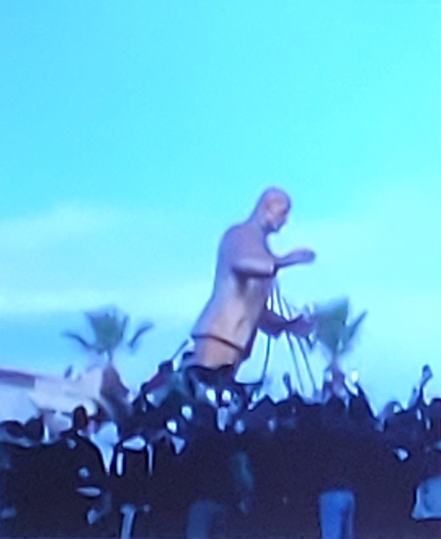
The toppling of the statue of Hafez al-Assad in Latakia, in 2024, which came to symbolize the fall of the Assad regime

On 9 December 2024, the day Assad was granted asylum in Moscow, the Russian news agency TASS reported that the armed opposition had taken full control of Latakia Governorate but had not threatened the Russian military bases. During the night to 10 December the Israeli Navy attacked Latakia port and sank 6 Osa-class missile boats of the Syrian Navy.

On 28 December 2025, three people were killed when protests occurred in the city. Alawite protesters gathered in Azhari square to ask for a decentralized political system in Syria and the release of Alawite prisoners.

== Geography ==
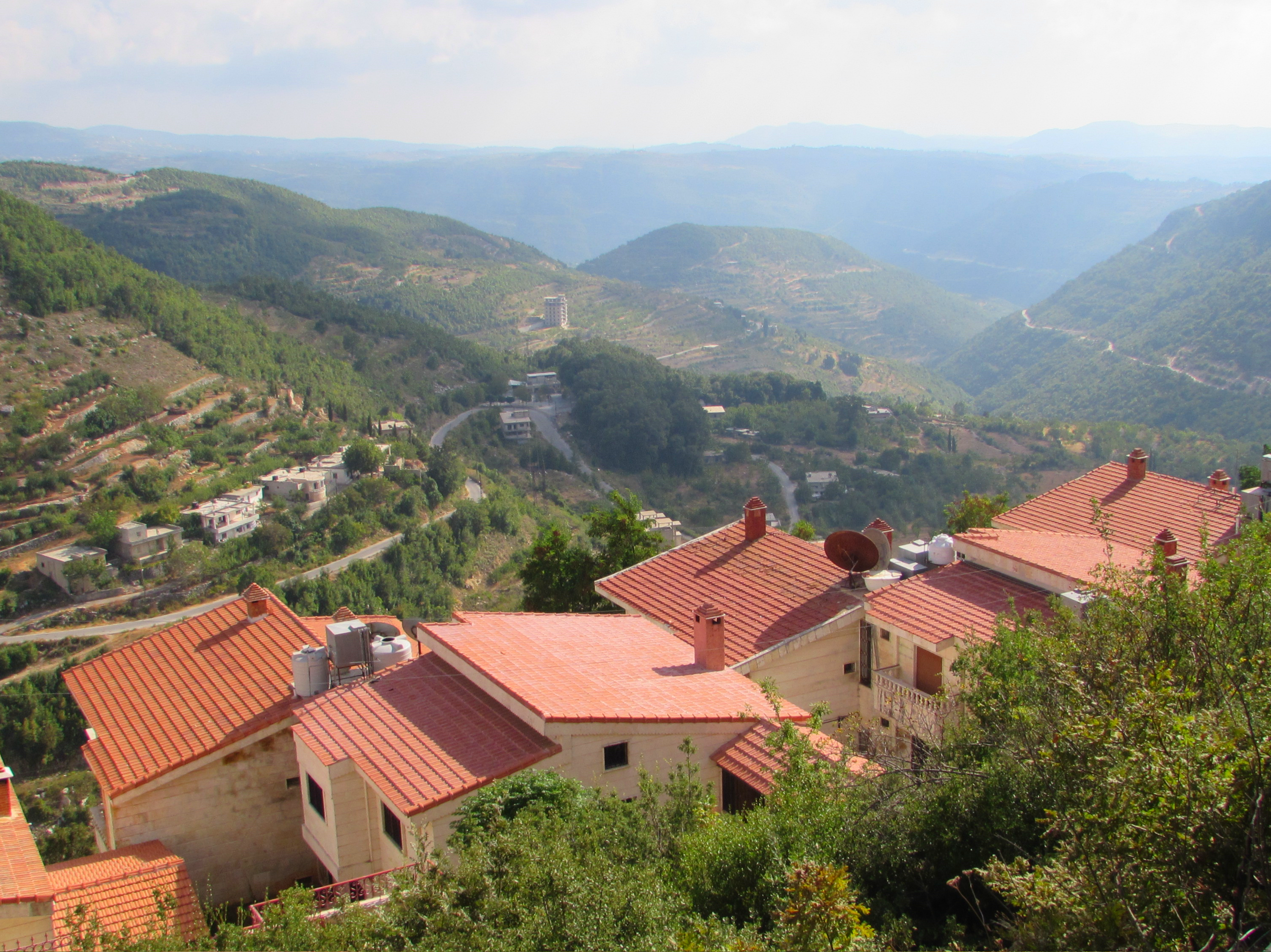
Slinfah

Latakia is located 348 kilometres (216 mi) north-west of Damascus, 186 kilometres (116 mi) south-west from Aleppo, 186 kilometres (116 mi) north-west of Homs, and 90 kilometres (56 mi) north of Tartus. Nearby towns and villages include Kasab to the north, Al-Haffah, Slinfah and Qardaha to the east in the Coastal Mountain Range, and Jableh and Baniyas to the south.

Latakia is the capital of the Latakia Governorate, in western Syria, bordering Turkey to the north. The governorate has a reported area of either 2,297 square kilometres (887 sq mi) or 2,437 square kilometres (941 sq mi). Latakia is the administrative centre of the Latakia District that occupies the northern portion of the Latakia Governorate.

Nahr al-Kabir al-Shamali flows into the Mediterranean Sea south of Latakia.

=== Climate ===
Under Köppen's climate classification, Latakia has a hot-summer Mediterranean climate (Csa) with warm, humid summers and cool, wet winters. Latakia's wettest months are December and January, where average precipitation is around 160 mm. The city's driest month, July, only has on average about 1 millimetre (0.04 in) of rain, despite being rather humid. Average high temperatures in the city range from around 16 °C (61 °F) in January to around 30 °C (86 °F) in August. Latakia on average receives around 760 millimetres (30 in) of rainfall annually.

Climate data for Latakia (1991–2020 normals, extremes 1928–present)
| Month | Jan | Feb | Mar | Apr | May | Jun | Jul | Aug | Sep | Oct | Nov | Dec | Year |
|---|---|---|---|---|---|---|---|---|---|---|---|---|---|
| Record high °C (°F) | 24.4 (75.9) | 26.3 (79.3) | 32.6 (90.7) | 35.6 (96.1) | 38.8 (101.8) | 38.4 (101.1) | 36.2 (97.2) | 38.4 (101.1) | 38.2 (100.8) | 39.0 (102.2) | 32.6 (90.7) | 28.0 (82.4) | 39.0 (102.2) |
| Mean daily maximum °C (°F) | 16.1 (61.0) | 17.0 (62.6) | 19.1 (66.4) | 22.0 (71.6) | 24.9 (76.8) | 27.5 (81.5) | 29.6 (85.3) | 30.6 (87.1) | 29.9 (85.8) | 27.5 (81.5) | 22.7 (72.9) | 18.0 (64.4) | 23.7 (74.7) |
| Daily mean °C (°F) | 12.0 (53.6) | 13.0 (55.4) | 15.3 (59.5) | 18.0 (64.4) | 21.5 (70.7) | 24.8 (76.6) | 27.2 (81.0) | 28.1 (82.6) | 26.2 (79.2) | 23.0 (73.4) | 17.7 (63.9) | 13.5 (56.3) | 20.0 (68.1) |
| Mean daily minimum °C (°F) | 8.4 (47.1) | 9.4 (48.9) | 11.1 (52.0) | 14.2 (57.6) | 17.7 (63.9) | 21.6 (70.9) | 24.6 (76.3) | 25.2 (77.4) | 22.6 (72.7) | 18.8 (65.8) | 13.7 (56.7) | 10.2 (50.4) | 16.5 (61.6) |
| Record low °C (°F) | −1.6 (29.1) | −0.5 (31.1) | −0.6 (30.9) | 3.9 (39.0) | 10.6 (51.1) | 11.7 (53.1) | 17.8 (64.0) | 17.2 (63.0) | 12.4 (54.3) | 8.9 (48.0) | 0.0 (32.0) | 0.0 (32.0) | −1.6 (29.1) |
| Average precipitation mm (inches) | 152.5 (6.00) | 109.3 (4.30) | 62.2 (2.45) | 40.8 (1.61) | 16.9 (0.67) | 5.2 (0.20) | 1.0 (0.04) | 1.3 (0.05) | 20.4 (0.80) | 65.8 (2.59) | 84.2 (3.31) | 140.8 (5.54) | 700.4 (27.56) |
| Average precipitation days (≥ 1.0 mm) | 12.5 | 10.3 | 7.5 | 5.7 | 2.8 | 0.6 | 0.1 | 0.4 | 2.5 | 5.9 | 6.4 | 10.7 | 61.7 |
| Average relative humidity (%) | 63 | 62 | 65 | 68 | 72 | 74 | 74 | 73 | 68 | 62 | 57 | 65 | 67 |
| Mean monthly sunshine hours | 136.4 | 148.4 | 198.4 | 225.0 | 297.6 | 321.0 | 325.5 | 316.2 | 288.0 | 248.0 | 192.0 | 151.9 | 2,848.4 |
| Mean daily sunshine hours | 4.4 | 5.3 | 6.4 | 7.5 | 9.6 | 10.7 | 10.5 | 10.2 | 9.6 | 8.0 | 6.4 | 4.9 | 7.8 |
Source 1: NOAA (sun 1961–1991) Starlings Roost Weather
Source 2: Deutscher Wetterdienst (humidity, 1966–1978), Meteo Climat (record highs and lows)

Climate data for Latakia International Airport (1991–2020)
| Month | Jan | Feb | Mar | Apr | May | Jun | Jul | Aug | Sep | Oct | Nov | Dec | Year |
|---|---|---|---|---|---|---|---|---|---|---|---|---|---|
| Record high °C (°F) | 25.0 (77.0) | 26.8 (80.2) | 32.8 (91.0) | 36.8 (98.2) | 40.0 (104.0) | 40.0 (104.0) | 36.5 (97.7) | 38.5 (101.3) | 41.0 (105.8) | 39.0 (102.2) | 33.1 (91.6) | 28.4 (83.1) | 41.0 (105.8) |
| Mean daily maximum °C (°F) | 16.6 (61.9) | 17.3 (63.1) | 19.6 (67.3) | 22.5 (72.5) | 25.6 (78.1) | 28.2 (82.8) | 30.3 (86.5) | 31.2 (88.2) | 30.3 (86.5) | 28.2 (82.8) | 23.1 (73.6) | 18.4 (65.1) | 24.3 (75.7) |
| Mean daily minimum °C (°F) | 7.2 (45.0) | 7.7 (45.9) | 9.7 (49.5) | 12.3 (54.1) | 15.5 (59.9) | 18.9 (66.0) | 21.6 (70.9) | 22.6 (72.7) | 20.5 (68.9) | 17.2 (63.0) | 12.1 (53.8) | 8.5 (47.3) | 14.5 (58.1) |
| Record low °C (°F) | −3.0 (26.6) | −3.2 (26.2) | 0.0 (32.0) | 2.0 (35.6) | 9.8 (49.6) | 13.0 (55.4) | 16.8 (62.2) | 18.3 (64.9) | 13.3 (55.9) | 7.6 (45.7) | 2.0 (35.6) | −3.0 (26.6) | −3.2 (26.2) |
| Average precipitation mm (inches) | 175.1 (6.89) | 131.5 (5.18) | 86.3 (3.40) | 52.6 (2.07) | 28.3 (1.11) | 8.0 (0.31) | 0.1 (0.00) | 3.7 (0.15) | 15.0 (0.59) | 56.7 (2.23) | 95.4 (3.76) | 172.8 (6.80) | 836.2 (32.92) |
| Average precipitation days (≥ 1.0 mm) | 12.0 | 10.2 | 8.1 | 5.9 | 3.3 | 0.7 | 0.1 | 0.4 | 1.6 | 4.7 | 6.3 | 10.9 | 64.1 |
Source: NCEI

== Demographics ==
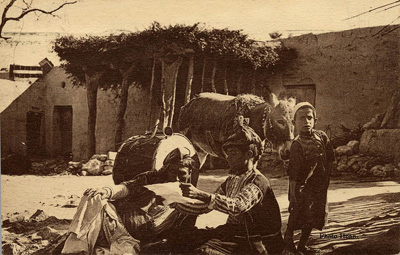
A group of resting Alawite musicians from Latakia (c. 1920s)

Historical population
| Year | Pop. | ±% |
|---|---|---|
| 1905 | 25,000 | — |
| 1932 | 24,000 | −4.0% |
| 1943 | 36,000 | +50.0% |
| 1957 | 56,000 | +55.6% |
| 1970 | 126,000 | +125.0% |
| 1987 | 241,000 | +91.3% |
| 1992 | 284,000 | +17.8% |
| 1994 | 303,000 | +6.7% |
| 2004 | 383,786 | +26.7% |

One of the first censuses was in 1825, which recorded that there were 6,000–8,000 Muslims, 1,000 Greek Orthodox Christians, 30 Armenian Christians, 30 Maronite Catholics, and 30 Jews. At the beginning of the 20th century, Latakia had a population of roughly 7,000 inhabitants; however, the Journal of the Society of Arts recorded a population of 25,000 in 1905. In a 1992 estimate, Latakia had a population of 284,000, rising to 303,000 in the 1994 census. The city's population continued to rise, reaching an estimated 402,000 residents in 2002. According to a 1971 research, the city was largely Sunni Muslim.

In 2010, Latakia City was 35% Sunni, 40% Alawite and 25% Christian , the rural hinterland has an Alawite majority of roughly 70%, with Sunni Muslims making up 14%, Christians making up 12%, and Ismailis representing the remaining 2%. The city serves as the capital of the Alawite population and is a major cultural center for the religion. Throughout the 1980s and 1990s, large numbers of Alawites from the area emigrated to the country's capital Damascus. Of the Christians, a sizable Antiochian Greek population exists in Latakia, and their diocese in the city has the largest congregation of the Greek Orthodox Church of Antioch. There is also an Armenian community of 3,500 in the city. The entire population speaks Arabic, mostly in the North Levantine dialect.

Within the city boundaries is the "unofficial" Latakia camp, established in 1956, which has a population of 6,354 Palestinian refugees, mostly from Jaffa and the Galilee.

== Economy ==
=== Port ===
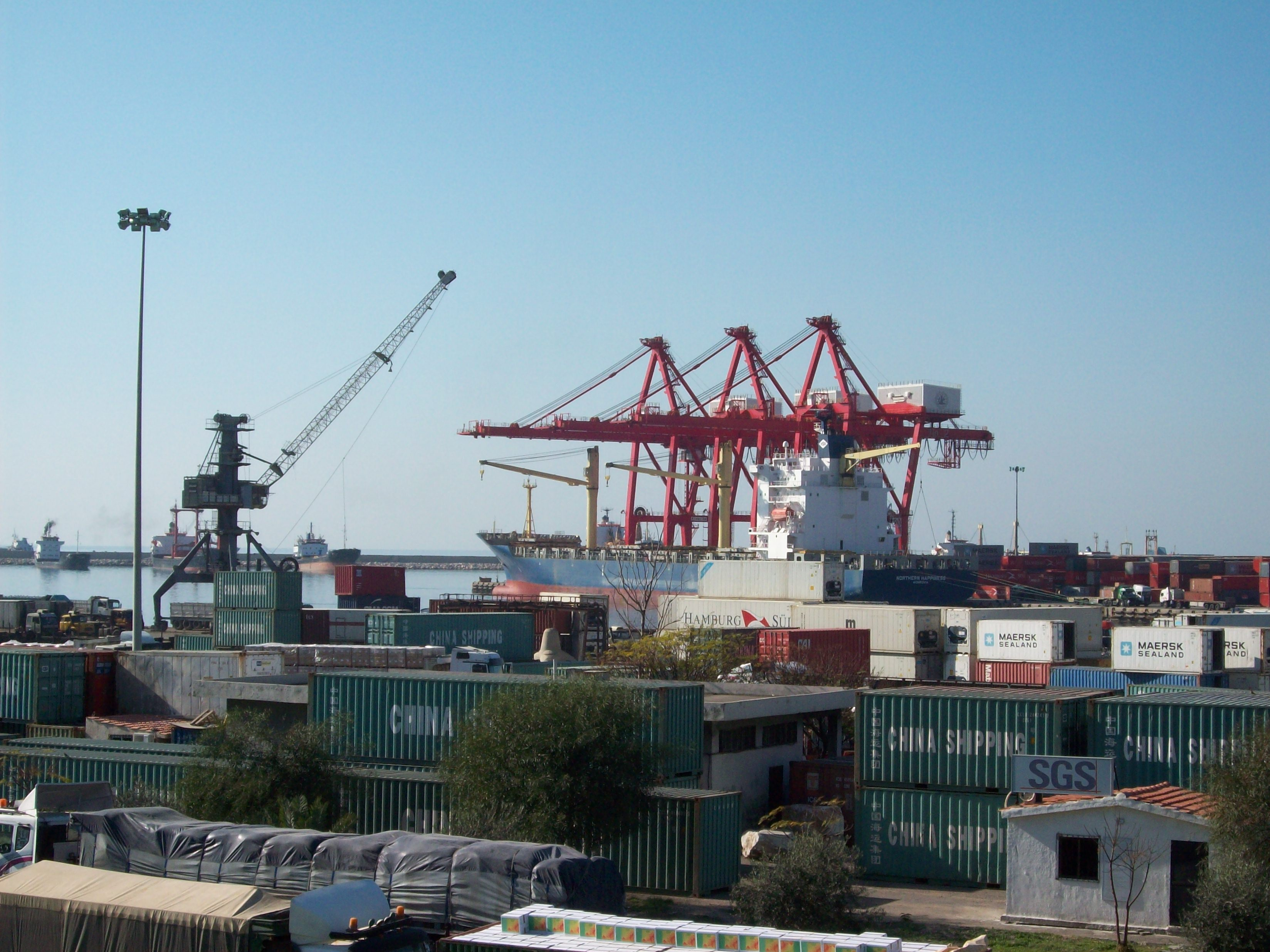
The Port of Latakia, Syria's main harbour

The Port of Latakia is the main seaport in Syria. It was established on 12 February 1950, and has boosted the city's importance ever since. The port's imported cargo includes clothing, construction materials, vehicles, furniture, minerals, tobacco, cotton, and food supplies such as lintels, onions, wheat, barley, dates, grains and figs, and in 2008, the port handled about 8 million tons of cargo.

The largest area of the port, with 43 hectares, is occupied by the container terminal. The storage capacity is 17,000 containers. Latakia was connected to six ferry lines to Alexandria (Egypt), İzmir (Turkey) and Beirut (Lebanon). It is not known whether the lines still exist in the Syrian civil war, which has been going on since 2011.

The marina Latakia has 150 berths for ships up to a maximum length of 25 meters and 4 meters draught. The Syrian Navy has one of its four bases in Latakia.

=== Agriculture ===
Latakia has an extensive agricultural hinterland. Exports include bitumen (asphalt), cereals, cotton, fruits, eggs, vegetable oil, pottery, and tobacco. Cotton ginning, vegetable-oil processing, tanning, and sponge fishing serve as local industries for the city.

=== Tourism ===
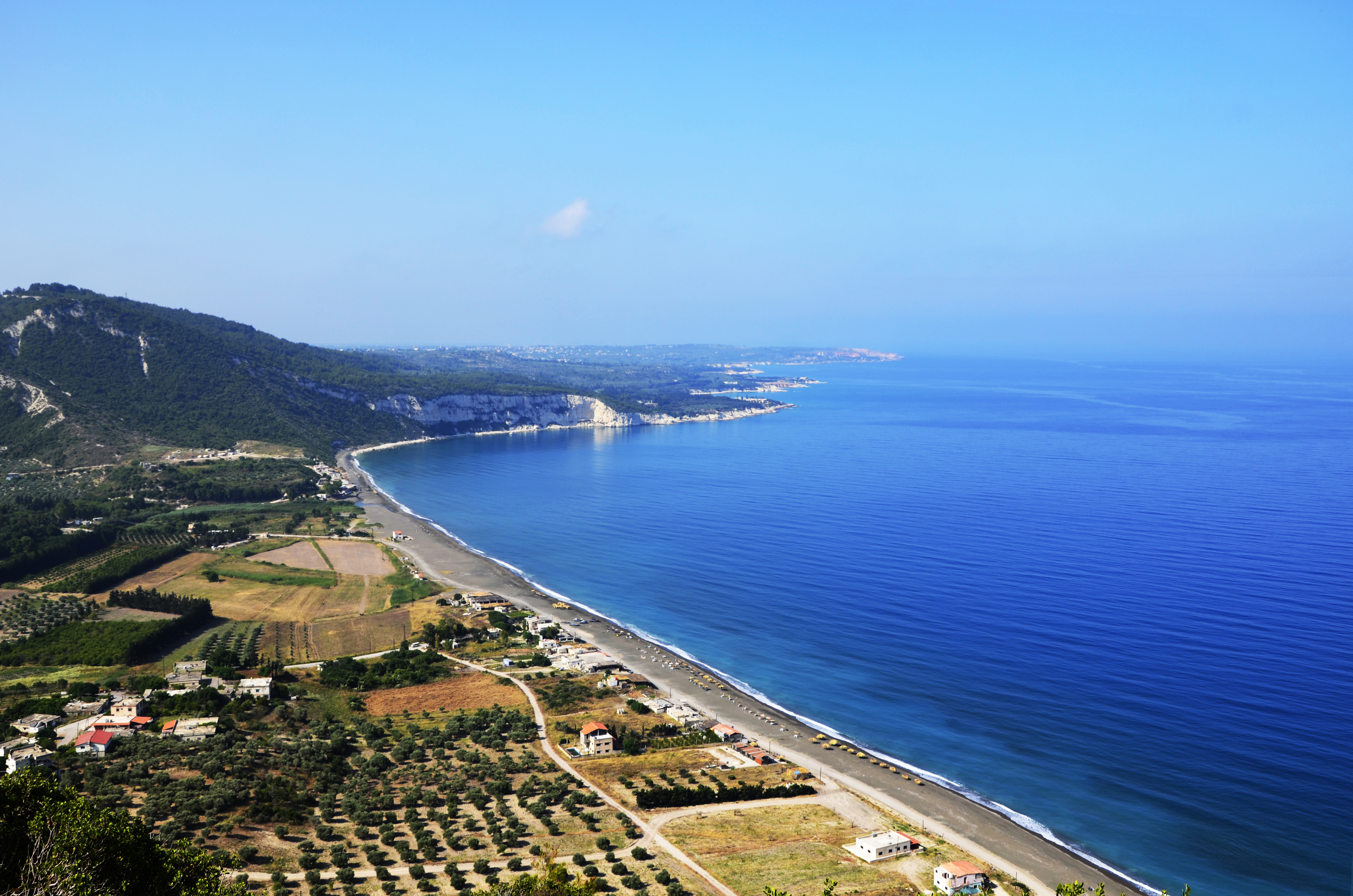
Wadi Qandeel beach, near Latakia

The information in this section is based on potentially outdated sources, with the most recent source being published in 2004.

The Cote d'Azur Beach of Latakia is Syria's premier coastal resort, and offers water skiing, jet skiing, and windsurfing. The city contains eight hotels, two of which have five-star ratings; both the Cote d'Azur de Cham Hotel and Lé Meridien Lattiquie Hotel are located 6 kilometres (3.7 mi) north of the city, at Cote d'Azur. The latter hotel has 274 rooms and is the only international hotel in the city.

Compared to other Syrian cities, window shopping and evening strolls in the markets is considered a favorite pastime in Latakia. Numerous designer-label stores line 8 Azar Street, and the heart of the city's shopping area is the series of blocks enclosed by 8 Azar Street, Yarmouk Street, and Saad Zaghloul Street in the city center. Cinemas in Latakia include Ugarit Cinema, al-Kindi, and a smaller theater off al-Moutanabbi Street.

== Culture ==
=== Festivals ===
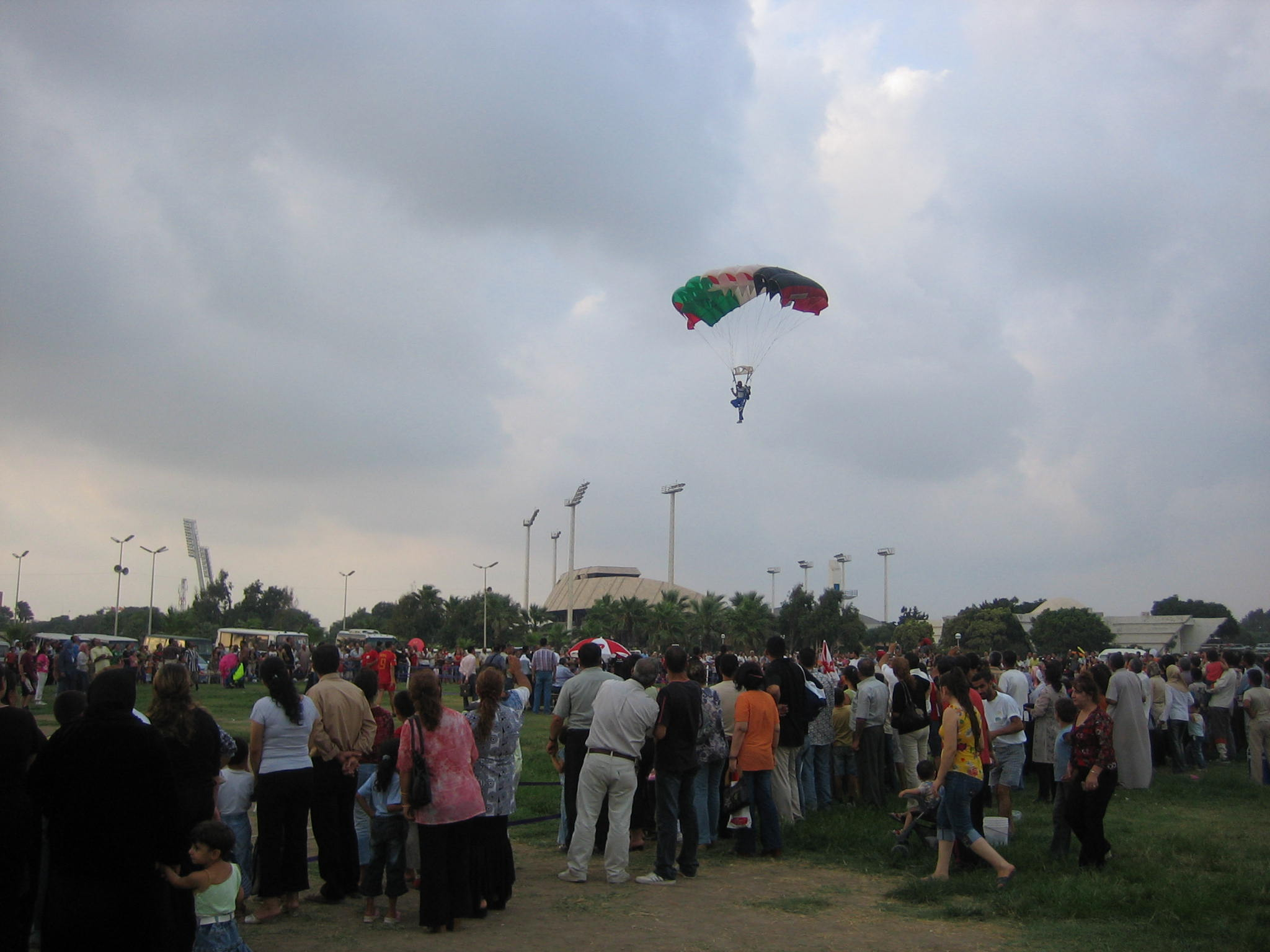
Latakia Sports City during al-Mahaba Festival

The Al-Mahabba Festival, which includes various entertainment programs such as competitions, art parties and archeological and tourist tours to the most important places in the city and is organized by the economic and commercial authorities in cooperation with the Al-Bustan charity organization, is held annually in the city.

=== Museums ===
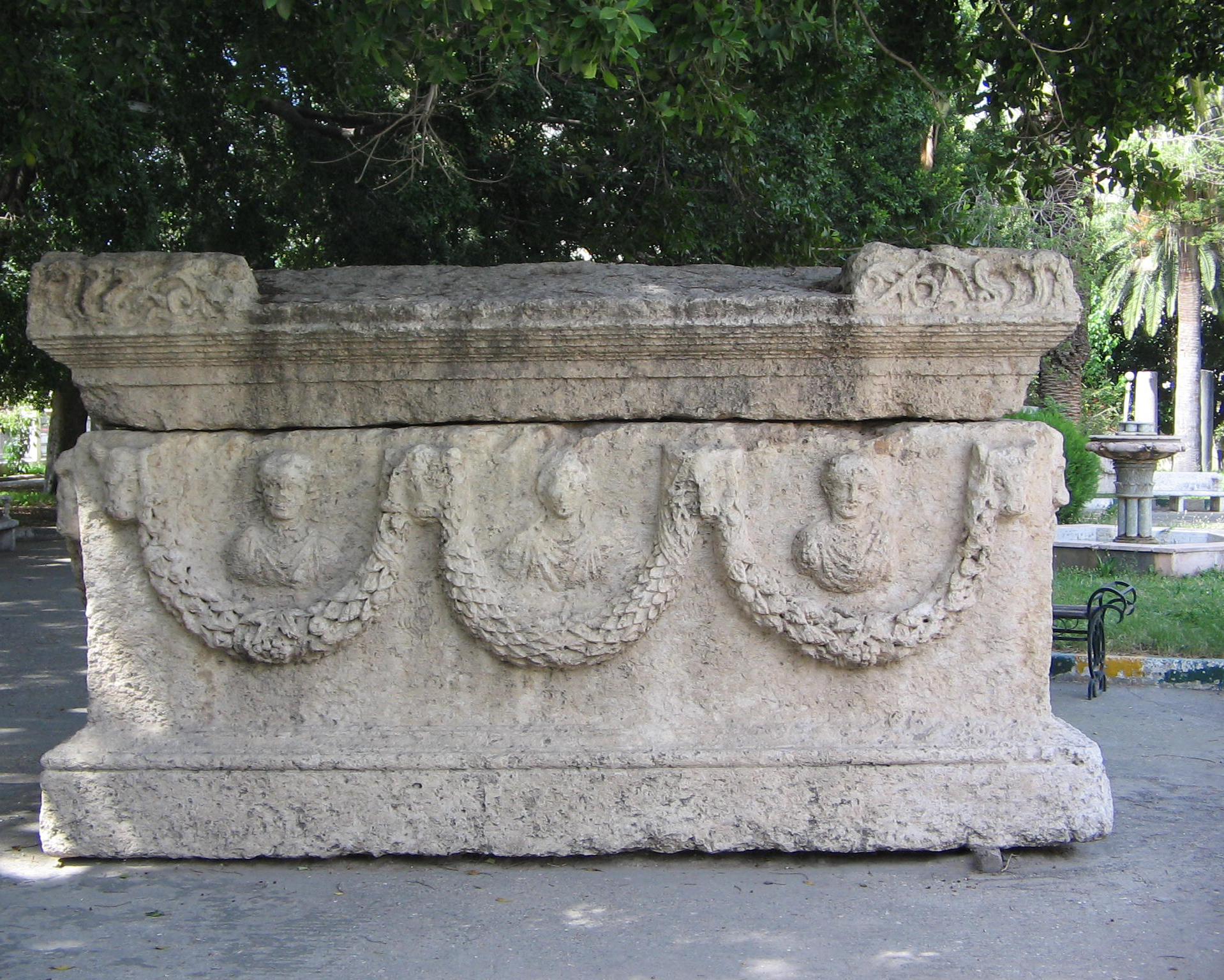
A Roman period funerary tomb, located in the city's museum

The National Museum of Latakia was built in 1986 near the seafront of the city. It formerly housed the residence of the Governor of the Alawite State and was originally a 16th-century Ottoman khan ("caravansary") known as Khan al-Dukhan, meaning "The Khan of Smoke", as it served the tobacco trade. The khan historically served not only as an inn, but also contained private residences. The exhibits include inscribed tablets from Ugarit, ancient jewellery, coins, figurines, ceramics, pottery, and early Arab and Crusader-era chain-mail suits and swords.

However, since the outbreak of the Syrian Civil War in 2011, the museum had been temporarily closed, to protect the museum's exhibits from the trafficking and looting, which became common during recent years, that the Museums of Palmyra, Deir ez-Zor and Raqqa suffered from. However, the museum's gardens are still open to the public, and contain many column capitals, ornaments, funerary tombs and statues which still can be viewed by the public.

=== Sport ===
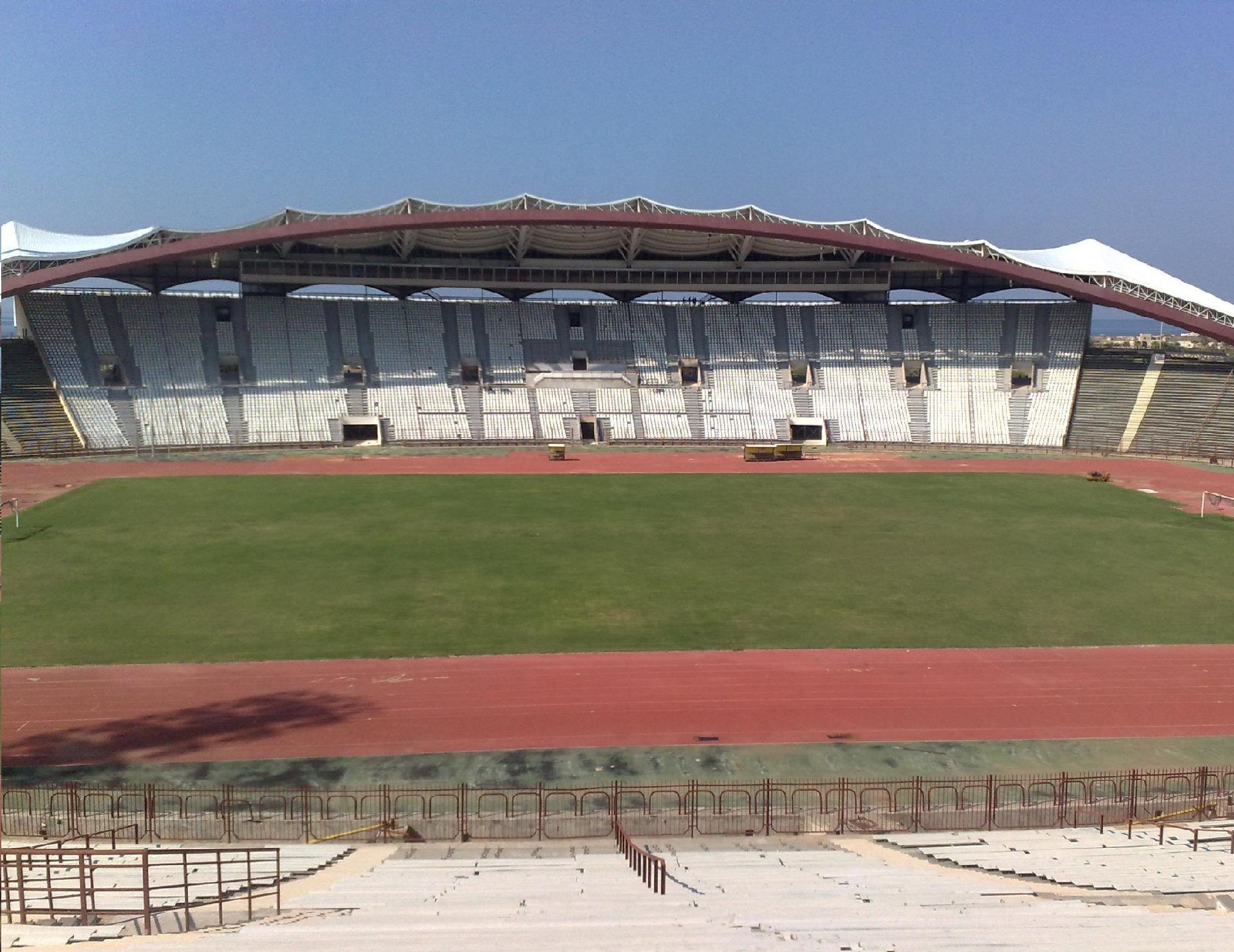
Latakia Sports City stadium

Latakia is the home city of three football clubs: Tishreen Sports Club was founded in 1947, Hutteen Sports Club was founded in 1945, and Tadamon SC was founded in 1980. All teams are based in the al-Assad Stadium, which carries a capacity of 28,000 people. Just north of the city is the Latakia Sports City complex, which was built in 1987 to host the 1987 Mediterranean Games.

=== Latakia tobacco ===
Latakia tobacco is a specially prepared tobacco originally produced in Syria and named after the port city of Latakia. Now the tobacco is mainly produced in Cyprus. It is cured over a stone pine or oak wood fire, which gives it an intense smokey-peppery taste and smell. Rarely smoked straight, it is used as a "condiment" or "blender" (a basic tobacco mixed with other tobaccos to create a blend), especially in British, Balkan, and some American Classic blends.

== Education ==
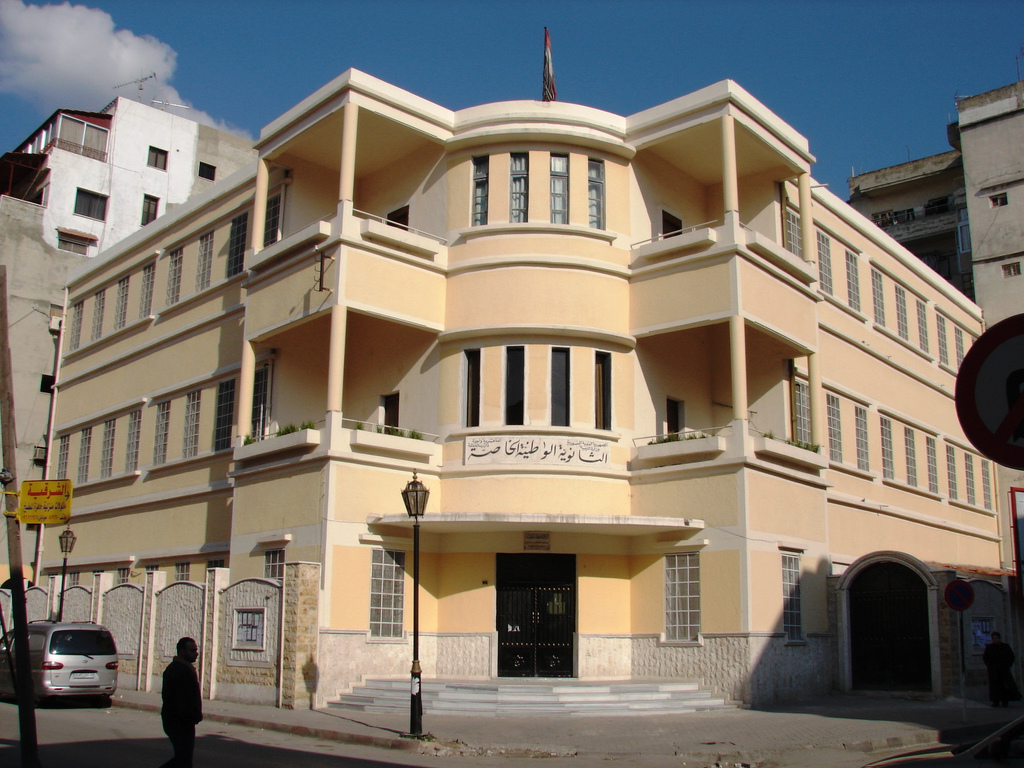
The National Private High School, built in the Bauhaus style

Latakia University of was founded in May 1971, and later renamed Tishreen University ("October University") in 1976 to commemorate the October War of 1973. The university first had only 3 faculties, Literature, Science and Agriculture and only an enrollment of 983 students during its founding, but that number largely grew throughout the years to reach more than 70,000 students, making the Latakia University the 3rd largest in Syria, with the number of its faculties rising to 17, including Medicine, Pharmacy, Dentistry, Science, Nursing, Education, Agriculture, Law, History, Electrical and Technical Engineering and Arts, among others. The city also houses a branch of the Arab Academy for Science and Technology and Maritime Transport.

One of the oldest schools in Latakia, a previous military barracks built during the Mandate for Syria and the Lebanon is named after Jules Jammal, an Arab Christian military officer who blew himself up in a suicide attack on a French ship.

On 26 November 2016, Manara University, a private university, was founded under the patronage of Imad Khamis, the Prime Minister of Syria. Its faculties as of 2017 include Pharmacy and Health, Engineering and Business.

== Main sights ==
The modern city still exhibits faint traces of its former importance, notwithstanding the frequent earthquakes with which it has been visited. The marina is built upon foundations of ancient columns, and there are in the town an old gateway and other antiquities, as also sarcophagi and sepulchral caves in the neighbourhood. This gateway is a remarkable triumphal arch at the southeast corner of the town, almost entire: it is built with four entrances, like the Arch of Janus in Rome. It is conjectured that this arch was built in honour of Lucius Verus, or of Septimius Severus. Fragments of Greek and Latin inscriptions are dispersed all over the ruins, but entirely defaced.

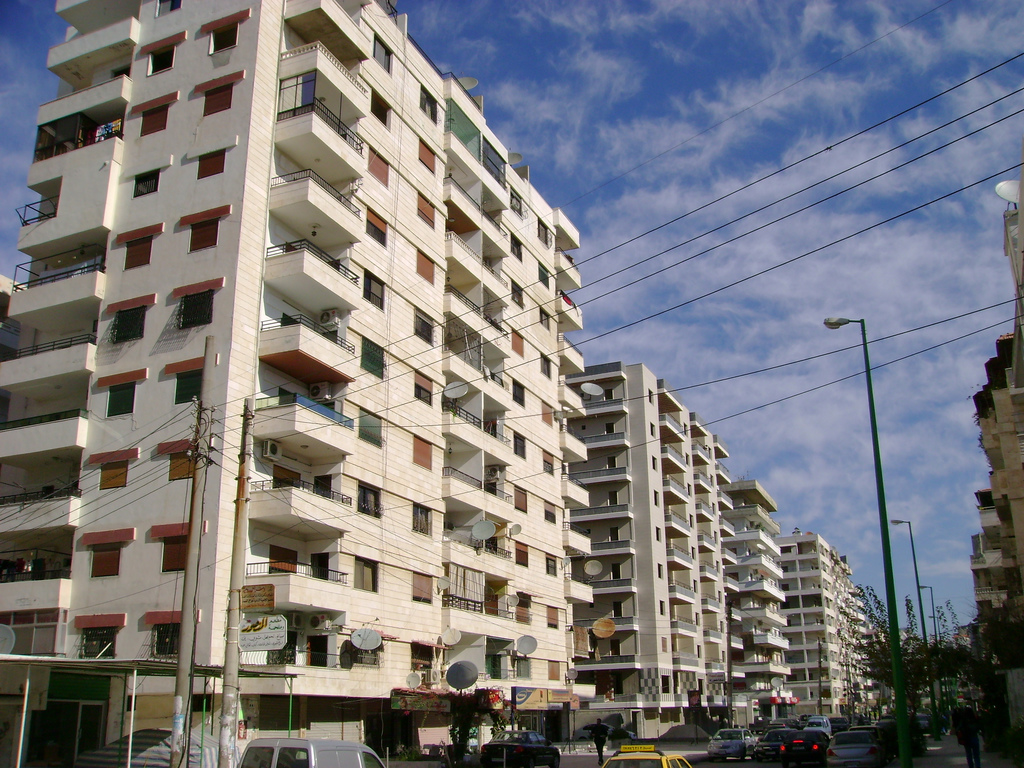
A modern neighborhood

Notable points of interest in the nearby area include the massive Saladin's Castle and the ruins of Ugarit, where some of the earliest alphabetic writings have been found. There are also several popular beaches. There are numerous mosques in Latakia, including the 13th-century Great Mosque and the 18th-century Jadid Mosque constructed by Suleiman Pasha Azem.

Latakia has consulates general of Finland and France, and honorary consulates of Greece and Romania.

== Local infrastructure ==
=== Healthcare ===
The Syrian government operates three major public hospitals in Latakia, Al-Assad Hospital, the National Hospital and the Latakia University Hospital, with other private hospitals working for private gain. One of the famous hospitals is Bahrou Hospital.

=== Transportation ===
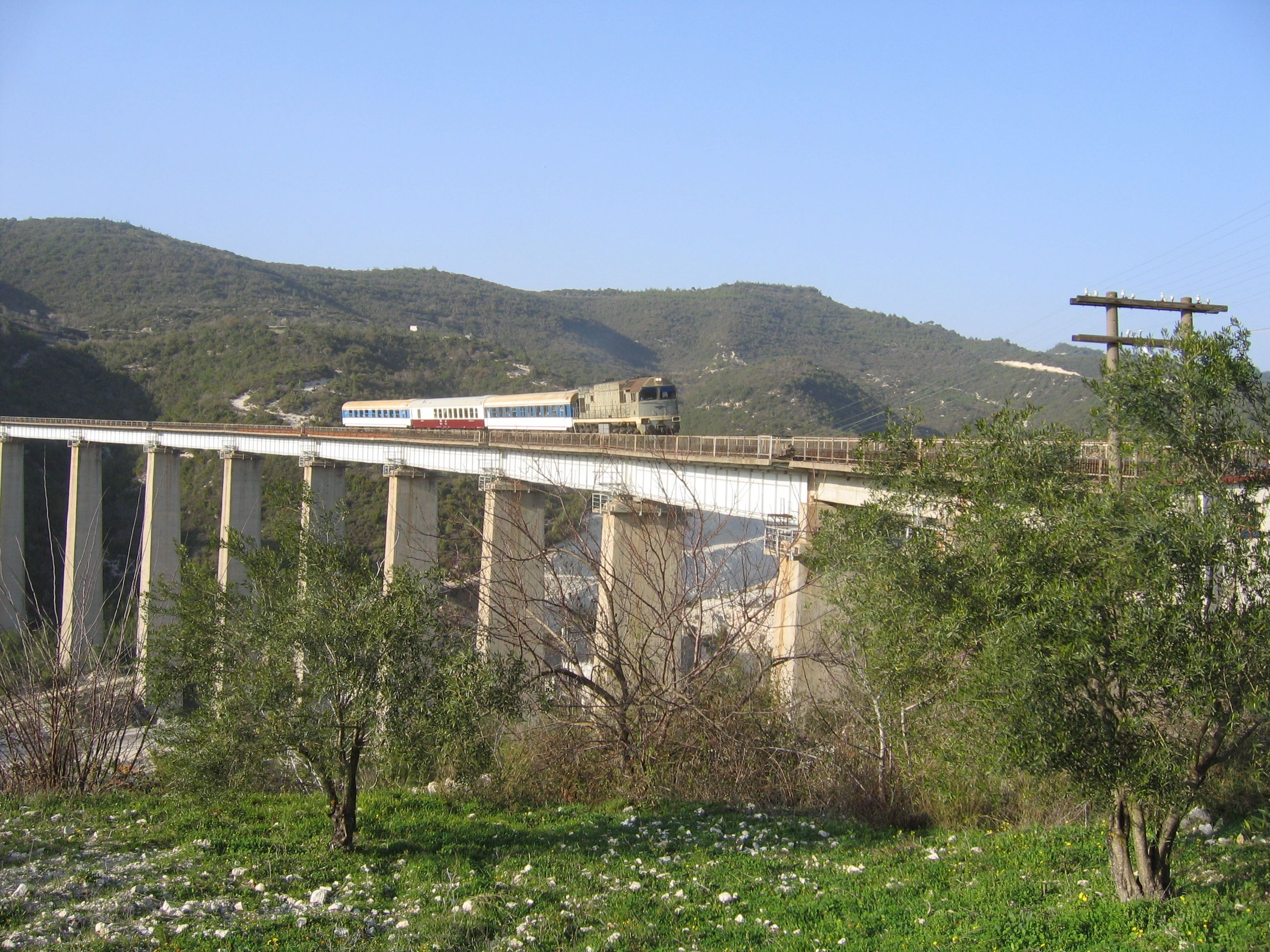
The railway linking between Latakia and Aleppo

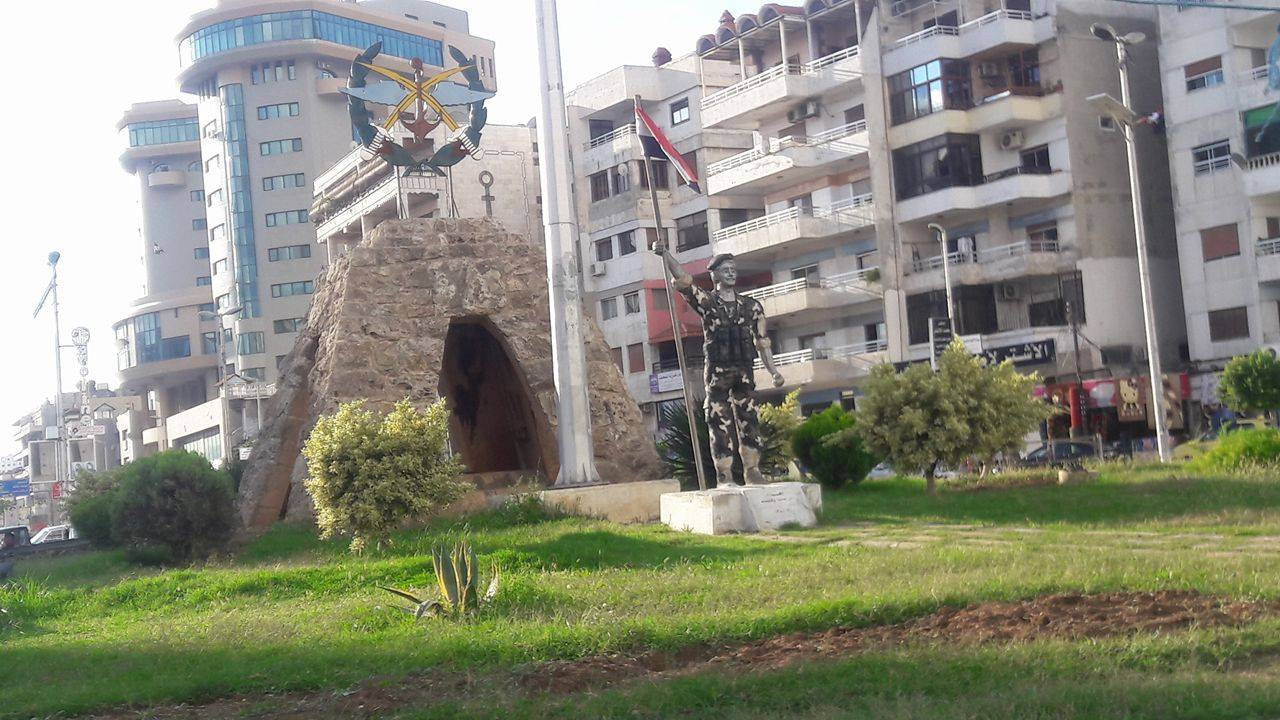
The Al-Ziraa roundabout is one of the city's most important roundabouts and links various streets of the city.

Roads link Latakia to Aleppo, Beirut, Homs, and Tripoli. The main commercial coastal road of the city is Jamal Abdel Nasser Street, named after former Egyptian president Gamal Abdel Nasser. Lined with hotels, restaurants and the city museum, the street begins in central Latakia along the Mediterranean coast and ends at Hitteen Square. From the square, it branches southwest into al-Maghreb al-Arabi Street, south into 8 Azar Street, which continues south to form Baghdad Avenue—the main north–south road—branching into Beirut Street and Nadim Hassan Street along the southern coastline. From the southern portion of Jamal Abdel Nasser Street branch off al-Yarmouk Street and al-Quds Street, the latter which ends at al-Yaman Square in western Latakia, it continues west into Abdel Qader al-Husseini Street. North from al-Yaman Square Souria Avenue and south of the square is al-Ourouba Street. Souria Avenue ends in al-Jumhouriah Square, then continues north as al-Jumhouriah Street.

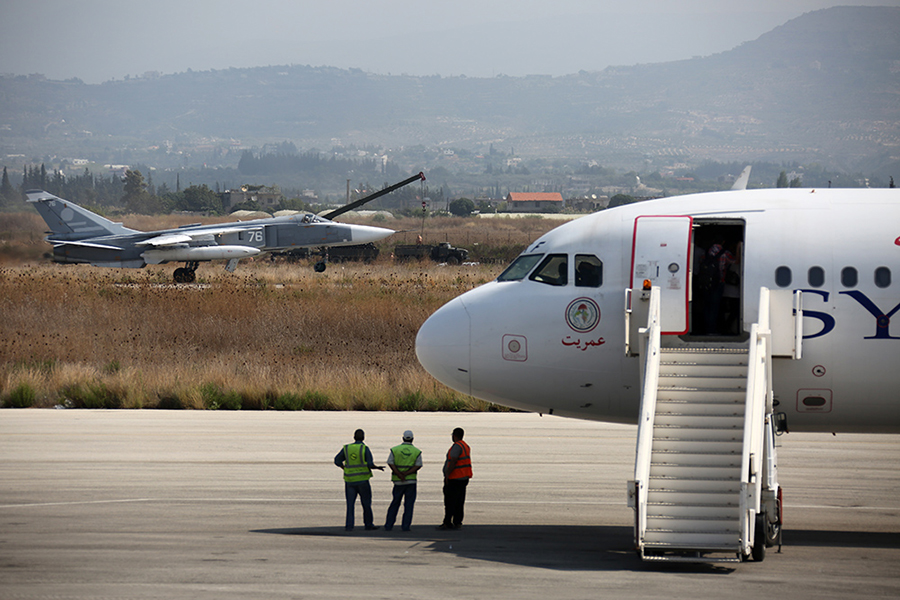
Latakia International Airport, located in Jableh, near Latakia, is the main airport serving the city

Much of the city is accessible by taxi and other forms of public transportation. Buses transport people to various Syrian, Lebanese, and Turkish cities, including Aleppo, Damascus, Deir ez-Zor, Palmyra, Tripoli, Beirut, Safita, Homs, Hama, Antakya, and Tartous. The "luxury" Garagat Pullman Bus Station is located on Abdel Qader al-Husseini Street, and at least a dozen private companies are based at the station. On the same street is the older Hob-Hob Bus Station that operates a "depart when full" basis to Damascus and Aleppo. Local microbuses run between al-Yaman Square and the city center, as well as between the station on al-Jalaa Street and the city center. There is also a microbus station with buses departing to Qalaat Salah ed-Din, Qardaha, Kassab, and Jableh.

Latakia's railway station is located on al-Yaman Square. Syrian Railways operated services, including two daily runs to Aleppo and one weekly run to Damascus via Tartous. In 2005, approximately 512,167 passengers departed from Latakia's railway station.

Latakia International Airport is located 25 kilometers (16 mi) south of Latakia and serves as a national and regional airport with regular flights to Sharjah, Jeddah, Riyadh and Cairo. The Port of Latakia is also a link in six organized cruises between Alexandria, İzmir and Beirut. In addition, there are irregular ferry services to Cyprus. In 2005, approximately 27,939 passengers used the port.

== Notable people ==
- Themison of Laodicea, founder of the Methodic school of medicine
- Philonides of Laodicea, Epicurean philosopher and mathematician
- Theodas of Laodicea, Pyrrhonist philosopher and physician of the Empiric school
- Apollinaris of Laodicea, 4th-century bishop of laodicea
- John X of Antioch, Patriarch of the Greek Orthodox Church of Antioch since 2012.
- Yusuf Yasin, journalist and politician who performed several roles in the Saudi government.
- A.R. Frank Wazzan, Dean, UCLA School of Engineering and Applied Sciences, 1986–2001.
- Rodolph Saadé, entrepreneur, father of Jacques Saadé, founder of CMA CGM, one of the world’s largest maritime shipping company.
- Adnan AlKateb, journalist، the editorial manager of Hia magazine
- Kamal Ibrahim, writer and professor of philosophy at the Lycée Saint Jean de Passy from 1973 to 2007.
- Bassem Yakhour, actor
- Hanna Mina, novelist
- Maram al-Masri, poet
- Ziad Abdullah, film critic and author
- Yasmina Azhari, businesswoman
- Raoul Gregory Vitale، Syrian musicologist
- Ali Abdullah Ayyoub, Syrian Deputy Prime Minister
- Mustafa Hamsho, professional boxer
- Nadim Nassar, priest and founder of Awareness Foundation
- Kevork Mardikian, former Syrian football midfielder of Armenian descent. He captained the Syrian national team between 1979 and 1985.
- Mardik Mardikian, Syrian professional footballer of Armenian descent
- Michel Kilo, was a Syrian writer and human rights activist, who has been called "one of Syria's leading opposition thinkers

== Twin towns – sister cities ==
Latakia is twinned with:

- Afyonkarahisar, Turkey
- Sousse, Tunisia
- Yalta, Ukraine (disputed)

== See also ==
- List of cities in Syria
- Timeline of Latakia
- Lake 16 Teshreen

== Bibliography ==
- Ashtor, Eliyahu (2014), Levant Trade in the Middle Ages, Princeton University Press, ISBN 978-1-400-853168
- Ball, Warwick (2000), Rome in the East: The Transformation of an Empire, Routledge, ISBN 9780415113762, archived from the original on 23 September 2023.
- Beattie, Andrew; Pepper, Timothy (2001), The Rough Guide to Syria, Rough Guides, ISBN 9781858287188, archived from the original on 8 July 2023
- Carter, Terry; Dunston, Lara; Humphreys, Andrew (2004), Syria & Lebanon, Lonely Planet, ISBN 9781864503333, archived from the original on 23 September 2023
- Carter, Terry; Dunston, Lara; Thomas, Amelia (2008), Syria & Lebanon, Lonely Planet, ISBN 9781741046090, archived from the original on 23 September 2023
- Dumper, Michael; Stanley, Bruce E.; Abu-Lughod, Janet L. (2007), Cities of the Middle East and North Africa: A Historical Encyclopedia, ABC-CLIO, ISBN 9781576079195, archived from the original on 23 September 2023.
- Fahlbusch, Erwin; Bromiley, Geoffrey William (2008), The Encyclopedia Of Christianity: Volume 5: Si-Z, Wm. B. Eerdmans Publishing, ISBN 9780802824172, archived from the original on 23 September 2023.
- La Boda, Sharon (1994), International Dictionary of Historic Places: Middle East and Africa, Taylor & Francis, ISBN 978-1-884-964039
- Hamilton, H.C.; Falconer, W., eds. (1857), The Geography of Strabo, vol. III, London: Henry G. Bohn, archived from the original on 23 September 2023.
- Maʻoz, Moshe; Yaniv, Avner; Gustav Heinemann Institute of Middle Eastern Studies (1986), Syria Under Assad: Domestic Constraints and Regional Risks, Taylor & Francis, ISBN 978-0-7099-2910-9, archived from the original on 23 September 2023.
- Mannheim, Ivan (2001), Syria & Lebanon Handbook: The Travel Guide, Footprint Travel Guides, ISBN 9781900949903, archived from the original on 23 September 2023
- Minahan, James (2002), Encyclopedia of the stateless nations: ethnic and national groups around the world, Greenwood Publishing Group, ISBN 9780313323843, archived from the original on 23 September 2023.
- Emerging Syria 2006, Oxford Business Group, 2006, ISBN 9781902339443, archived from the original on 23 September 2023.
- Podeh, Elie (1999), The Decline of Arab Unity: The Rise And Fall of the United Arab Republic, Sussex Academic Press, ISBN 978-1-84519-146-7
- Rabinovich, Itamar (1979), "The Compact Minorities and the Syrian State, 1918-45", Journal of Contemporary History, 14 (4): 693–712, doi:10.1177/002200947901400407, S2CID 154583615, archived from the original on 7 October 2013
- Riley-Smith, Jonathan (2005), The Crusades: A History, Continuum International Publishing Group, ISBN 9780826472700, archived from the original on 23 September 2023.
- Ring, Trudy; Salkin, Robert M.; La Boda, Sharon (1994), International Dictionary of Historic Places, Taylor & Francis, ISBN 9781884964039, archived from the original on 23 September 2023.
- le Strange, Guy (1890), Palestine Under the Moslems: A Description of Syria and the Holy Land from A.D. 650 to 1500, Committee of the Palestine Exploration Fund, ISBN 978-0-404-56288-5, archived from the original on 23 September 2023.
- Society of Arts (Great Britain) (1906), Journal of the Society of Arts, vol. 54, The Society, archived from the original on 23 September 2023.
- Winckler, Onn (1998), Demographic developments and population policies in Baʻathist Syria, Sussex Academic Press, ISBN 978-1-902210-16-2, archived from the original on 23 September 2023
- Winter, Stefan (2010), The Shiites of Lebanon under Ottoman Rule, 1516-1788, Cambridge University Press, doi:10.1017/CBO9780511676413, ISBN 9780511676413, archived from the original on 23 September 2023.
- Winter, Stefan (2016), A History of the 'Alawis: From Medieval Syria to the Turkish Republic, Princeton University Press, ISBN 9780691173894, OCLC 959149416, archived from the original on 28 November 2021.
