= Siege of Laodicea (1188) =

Ayyubid siege of Latakia, 12th century

- Part of The Crusades
Date	20–22 July 1188
Location	Latakia
Result	Ayyubid victory

Belligerents
Ayyubid Sultanate	Principality of Antioch

Commanders and leaders
Saladin	Bohemond III of Antioch

Strength
Unknown	Unknown

Casualties and losses
Unknown	Unknown

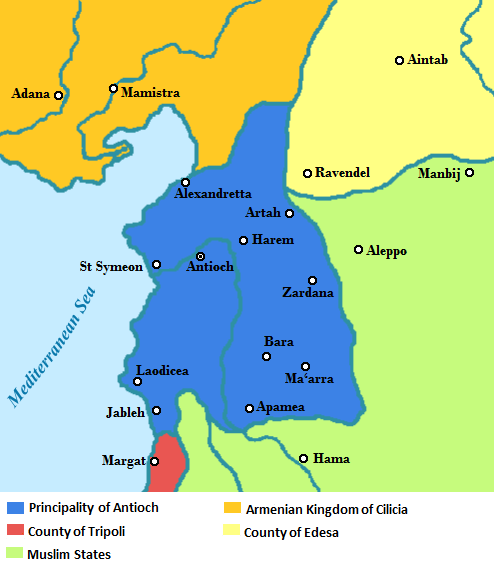
Principality of Antioch (1135)

The siege of Loadicea took place in July 1188 between the Ayyubid Sultanate led by Saladin and the Principality of Antioch, who held modern-day Latakia. After a few days of siege, the city was captured.

== Prelude ==
Saladin had arrived before the city of Jableh on the 18th month of Jumada al-Awwal (15 July 1188). At Jabla, there happened to be a Muslim resident there with a Qadi to settle their dispute. Saladin gave him the city's government; he offered no resistance, but the Crusaders held out the castle the next day. The castle surrendered, and Saladin remained there until the 23rd of Jumada (20 July).

== Siege ==
Saladin then marched out of Jableh and headed towards Latakia, the city was attractive as it possess a lively harbor and two castles lying side by side on a hill overlooking the town, Saladin besieged both the city and the castles, he then ordered an assault on the city, they attacked the city vigorously with shouts this continued until 24th of Jumada (21 July) the city was taken though the two castles still resisted.

Latakia was a wealthy city known as a trading post, and the Ayyubids earned a large booty full of treasures. Night had fallen when they left the city for the castles. On Friday morning, the attack on the castles was resumed, and a breach was made on the north section of the walls, which was 18 inches deep and four inches wide. The Ayyubids climbed the hill, got closer to the walls, and assaulted them. The battle raged, and both sides began throwing stones with their hands.

When the Crusaders saw the ferocity of the attack and how close they approached, they offered to surrender on Friday, 25 Jumada (22 July). Saladin granted the request and allowed the Qadi of Jableh to set up the treaty. The Ayyubids returned to their tents fatigued, and the Crusaders were permitted to leave with their families and their belongings in exchange for leaving their weapons, horses, and other instruments.

The marble facades of the city were ripped off and carried away. Saladin appointed Emir Sunkur al Kilati governor and garrisoned the city with strong men.

== Aftermath ==
The capture of the city cut off the Principality of Antioch, the County of Tripoli, and the Kingdom of Jerusalem, which contributed to a coastal sailing between them. The capture of Latakia marked the end of the crusader occupation of the town; in 1190, the town was dismantled due to the upcoming German crusader force led by Frederick Barbarossa. In October 1191, Bohemond III of Antioch attempted to recapture the city but failed; another attempt was made in 1197 but again failed. By 1260, the Crusaders had recaptured the city temporarily, until they were defeated by the Mamluks of Qalawun on April 20, 1287.
