= National Museum of Latakia =

Museum in Latakia, Syria

National Museum of Latakia المتحف الوطني في اللاذقية
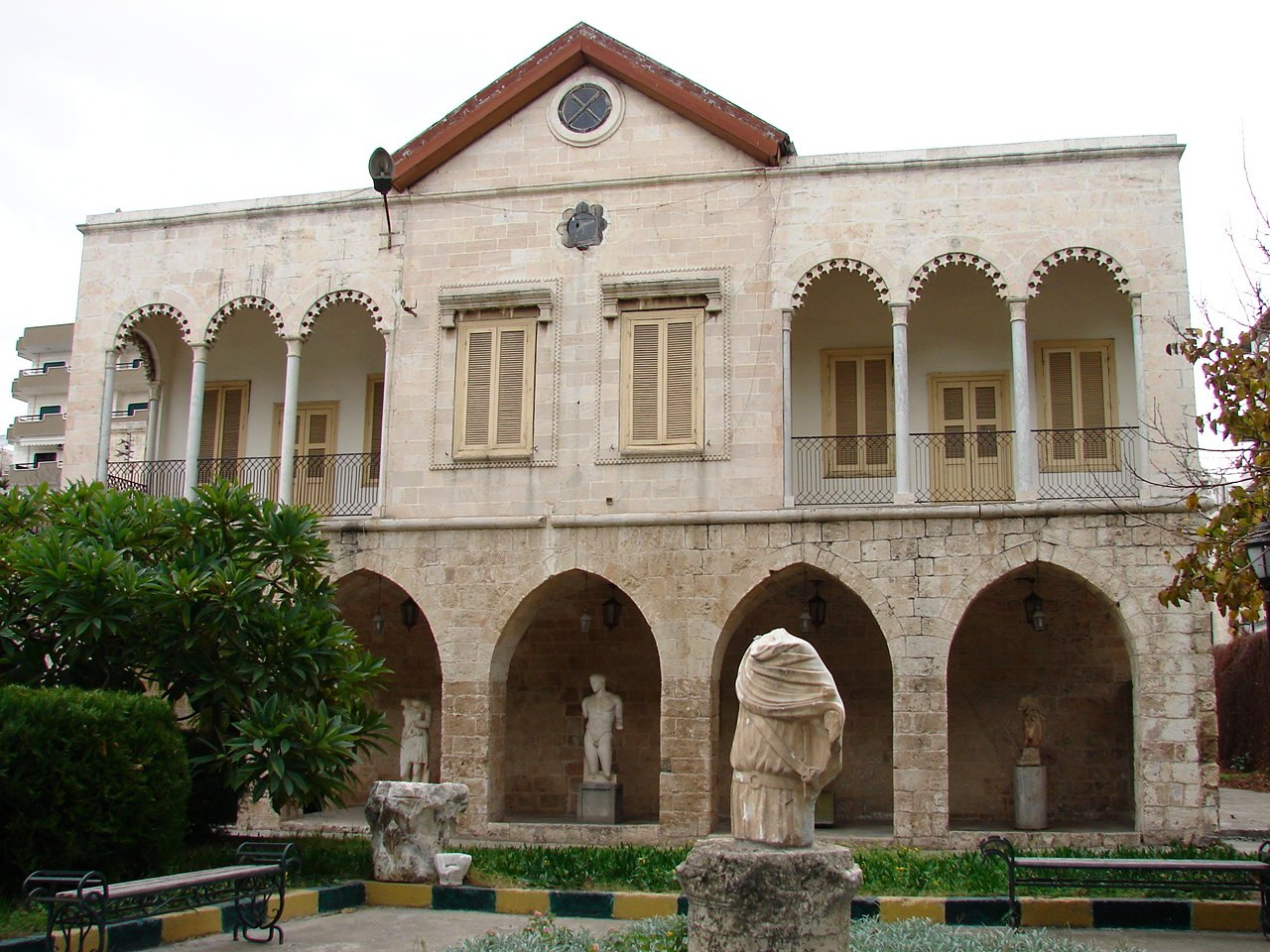
- Courtyard of the museum

- Location in Syria
- Established: 1986
- Location: Latakia, Syria
- Coordinates: 35.517799°N 35.772163°E
- Type: Historical
- Director: Jamal Haidar

The National Museum of Latakia (Arabic: المتحف الوطني في اللاذقية), also known as the Latakia Museum (متحف اللاذقية), is a museum located in the coastal city of Latakia, Syria, near the city's seafront, facing the Port of Latakia. It was inaugurated in 1986.

== History ==
The museum formerly housed the residence of the Governor of the Alawite State and was originally a 16th-century Ottoman khan ("caravansary") known as Khan al-Dukhan, meaning "The Khan of Smoke", as it served the tobacco trade. The khan historically served not only as an inn, but also contained private residences.

== Exhibits ==
The museum consists of six halls, each showcasing exhibits from different periods from the city's history. The first two halls are dedicated to the cities of Ugarit, Ebla, the site of Ras ibn Hani and the Ancient Near East in general, while the third hall is dedicated to the Classical antiquity, which contains many notable exhibits from the Seleucid and Roman eras in which the city flourished in. The fourth hall is dedicated to the Islamic period beginning from the 7th century, and showcases many notable examples of Islamic art such as ceramics, calligraphy and weaponry while the final hall is dedicated to modern art and showcases the works of contemporary Syrian and Arab artists. The exhibits of the halls include inscribed tablets from Ugarit, ancient jewellery, coins, figurines, ceramics, pottery, and early Arab and Crusader-era chain-mail suits and swords.

Since the outbreak of the Syrian Civil War in 2011, the museum had been temporarily closed, to protect the museum's exhibits from the trafficking and looting, which became common during recent years, and had been evidenced by the Museums of Palmyra, Deir ez-Zor and Raqqa. However the museum's gardens are still open to the public, and contain many column capitals, ornaments, funerary tombs and statues which still can be viewed by the public, and the museum also continues to be used as a venue for art exhibits, fairs and festivals.

In September 2014, local archaeologists from the Latakia Archaeology department discovered a secret tunnel extending from underneath the museum to the city's beachfront on the west, and work is still ongoing to find out how the tunnel was constructed, its age, and whether or not it's connected to other tunnels or secret chambers or vaults.

== Gallery ==
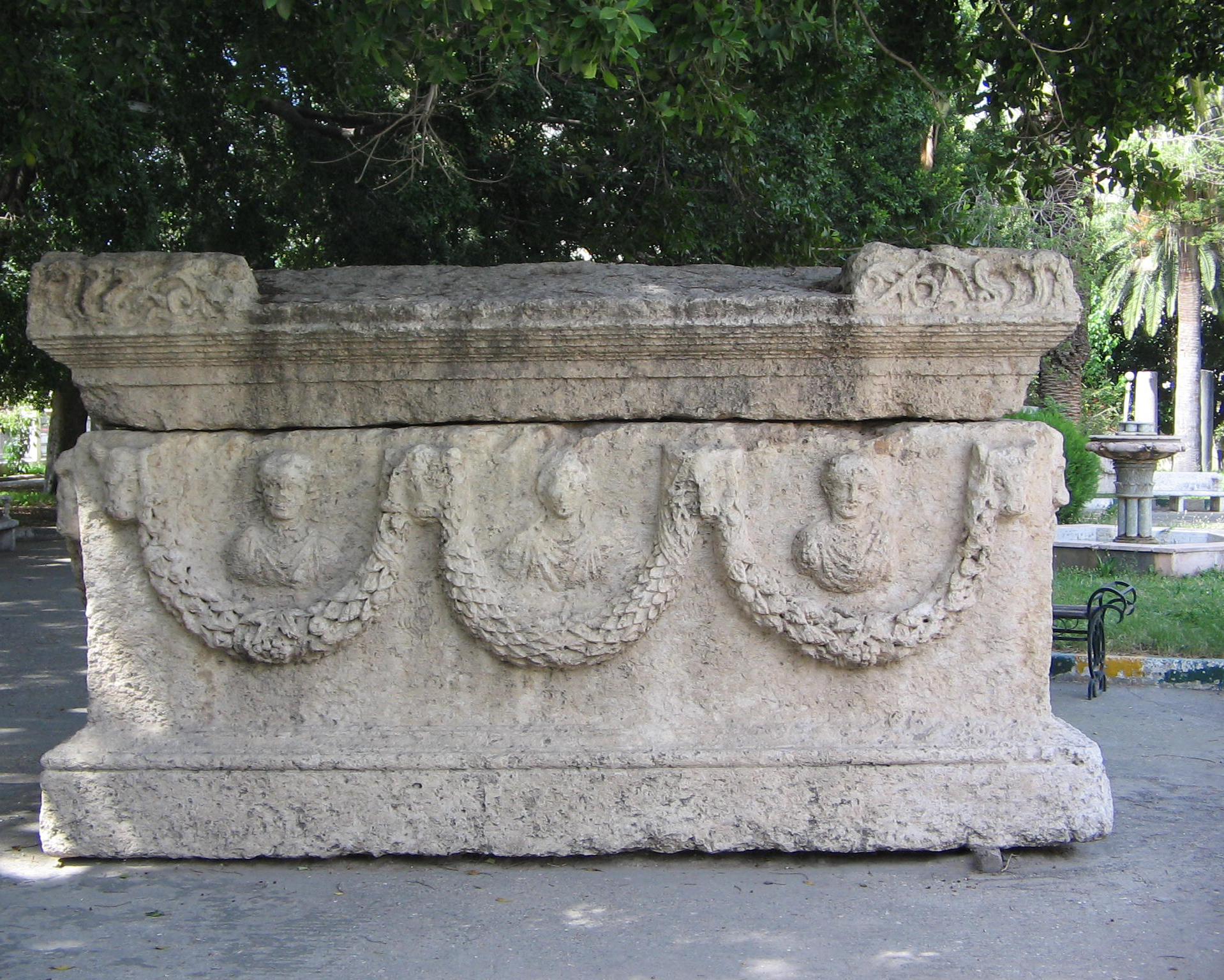
A Roman-era funerary tomb in the museum's gardens

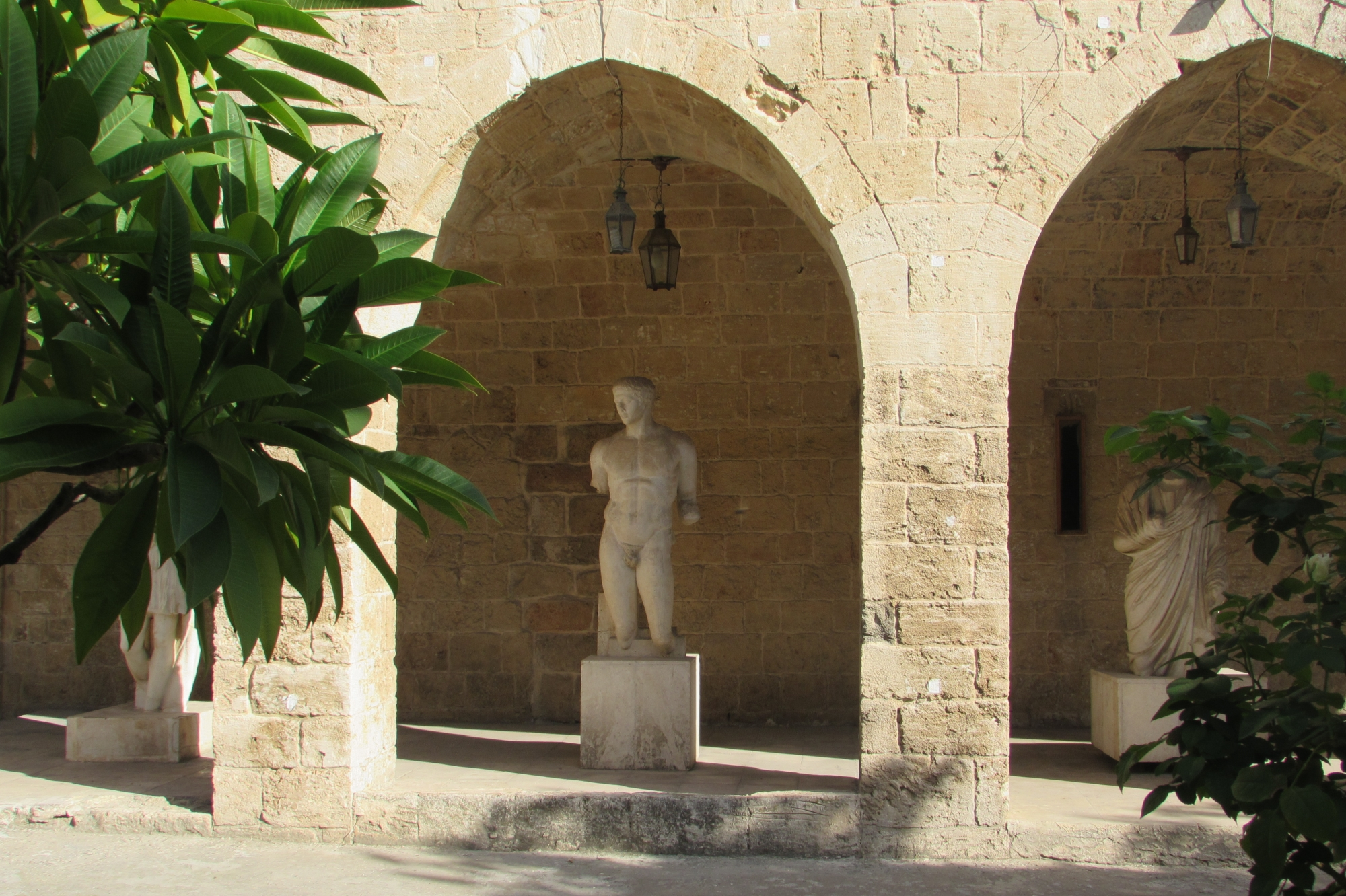
Statues at the National Museum of Latakia's courtyard

== See also ==
- List of museums in Syria
