= List of Syrian defectors =

During the rule of the al-Assad family and the Syrian Civil War, a number of prominent Syrian figures have defected to either the rebellion or to other countries:

== During Hafez al-Assad rule ==
- Bassam Adal – 1989 (to Israel)

== During Bashar al-Assad rule ==
- Hussam Awak, Syrian Air Force and Air Force Intelligence Directorate officer, claims to have defected in 2005, though others argue that he only joined the Syrian opposition out of opportunism
- Abdul Halim Khaddam, interim President of Syria, defected in 2005 and fled to Europe

=== Syrian civil war ===
- Mohib Omar al-Jadaan, colonel of the Syrian Air Force to Free Syrian Army
- Bassim Al Khaled, first lieutenant, defected in June 2011
- Mohammad Bassam Imadi, Former Ambassador to Sweden – 2011
- Abdul Razzaq Tlass, former Syrian police first lieutenant, defected in June 2011, one of the founders of the Khalid ibn al-Walid Brigade in August 2011, and founder and commander of the Farouq Brigades, October 2011–October 2012
- Riad al-Asaad, former colonel in the Syrian Air Force, and former commander of the Free Syrian Army, July 2011
- Mustafa Al-Sheikh, former General in the Secret Police force, and former head of the Free Syrian Army – 6 January 2012
- Imad Ghalioun, parliamentarian for Homs – January 2012 (to Egypt)
- Abdo Hussameddin, Deputy Oil Minister – 7 March 2012
- Firas Tlass, son of Mustafa Tlass, the former defence minister under Hafez al-Assad – 12 March 2012 (to Paris)
- Hassan Hamada, Syrian Air Force Colonel – 2012 (to Jordan)
- Fares Bayoush, Syrian Air Force lieutenant colonel – July 2012
- Manaf Tlass, Brigadier General of the Republican Guard – 2012 (to Turkey, later Paris)
- Nawaf al-Fares, Ambassador to Iraq – 2012 (In Iraq, later moved to Qatar)
- Adnan Silu, Major General and former head of Syria's chemical weapons program – July 2012 defected to the opposition.
- Abdelatif al-Dabbagh, Ambassador to the UAE, July 2012 (to Qatar)
- Lamia al-Hariri, niece of Syrian vice president Farouk al-Sharaa, Envoy to Cyprus, – July 2012 (to Qatar)
- Mohammad Tahseen Faqir, military attaché at the Syrian embassy in Oman – July 2012
- Ikhlas al-Badawi, Aleppo MP, a Ba'athist and an Assad loyalist, defected to Turkey with her six children – July 2012
- Farouk Taha, Ambassador to Belarus. Fled to Belarus in the spring, but did not publicize his defection before late July.
- Khaled al-Ayoubi, Chargé d'affaires at the embassy to the United Kingdom and most senior diplomat in the country after higher officials were expelled. – July 2012.
- Mohammad Hussam Hafez, Consul at the Syrian embassy in Yerevan, Armenia – July 2012.
- General Muhammed Faris, a military aviator who became the first Syrian in space, defects to Turkey.
- Riyad Farid Hijab – Syrian Prime minister, August 2012.
- Mohammad al Jililati – Finance Minister, reported to have been arrested while trying to defect. Denied by the Syrian state TV, which said Mr Jililati was still in his office working as usual, and it broadcast what it said was a phone interview with him denying reports that he had been detained.
- Danny al-Baaj – Syria's representative at the United Nations Human Rights Council, defects to Geneva, 11 July 2012
- Brigadier General Ibrahim al-Jabawi – deputy police commander for the central Syrian province of Homs, 12 July 2012 (to Jordan)
- Salim Idris – Former general in the Syrian Police Force when he defected in July 2012. Formerly served as the Chief of Staff of the Free Syrian Army.
- Yaroub al-Shara – cousin of Syrian Vice President Farouk al-Shara.
- Naser al-Hariri – Former member of the People's Council of Syria from Daraa, 23 August 2012 (to Jordan)
- Mohamed Moussa al-Khairat – Commander of the seventh division within the Syrian Police Force, 25 August 2012 (to Jordan)
- Muhammad Khayr al-Hariri – Former Syrian MP and tribal chief of the southern Daraa region, 27 August (to Jordan)
- Abdullah Al-Omar – Director of several pro-government Syrian Channels, September 2012.
- Mohammad Fares – a Syrian Pilot.
- Awad Ahmed al-Ali – head of the security branch in Damascus, September 2012 (to Turkey)
- Emad al-Ahmar – Syrian Consul in Kuala Lumpur, Malaysia 8 September 2012 (to Egypt).
- Mahmoud Obeid – Syrian diplomatic attaché in Malaysia, 8 September 2012 (to Egypt).
- Bashar al-Haj – Syrian diplomatic attaché in Serbia, September 2012 (?)
- Youssef Assad – Syrian Air Force officer and a family relative of President Bashar al-Assad.
- Khaled Abdul Rahman al Zamel – a Syrian colonel who initially defected to join the opposition forces, and in late September 2012 called on to abandon the insurgency against President Bashar al-Assad (accompanied by around 10 other former rebels).
- Jihad Makdissi – Syrian Foreign Ministry's spokesman, 2 December 2012 (to the UK).
- Adnan Salo – former head of the chemical weapons unit in the Syrian Army, 9 December 2012
- Major General Abdulaziz al-Shalal – commander of Syria's Military Police, 25 December 2012.
- Kamal Jamal Beyk – Former director of programming at the official SANA radio and the SANA online news website in Damascus, 28 December 2012 (to Paris).
- Lama Al-Khadra – Former state-run radio station Radio Damascus Journalist, 28 December 2012 (to Paris)
- Baddour Abdel Karim – former state-run radio station Radio Damascus Journalist, 28 December 2012 (to Paris)
- Maj. Gen Mohammed Ezz al-Din Khalouf – chief of supplies and logistics of Syrian Armed Police Forces, 16 March 2013 (to Jordan).
- Sayf Bulad – former First Lieutenant in the Syrian Army
- Anwar Raslan - former Syrian colonel who led a unit of Syria's General Intelligence Directorate. Fled to Jordan then sought Asylum in Germany, where in January 2022, he was convicted of crimes against humanity in a German Higher Regional Court.
- Issam al-Khalif – Syrian jurist and academic. He began his career as an income controller at the Hama Finance Directorate in 2010 before defecting from the Assad regime on 1 October 2013. He currently serves as President of the Supreme Constitutional Court under the Syrian transitional government led by President Ahmed al-Sharaa.

There are many other diplomats not listed.
