= Timeline of the Syrian civil war (May–August 2012) =

The following is a timeline of the Syrian Civil War from May to August 2012. The majority of death tolls reported for each day comes from the Local Coordination Committees, an opposition activist group based in Syria, and the Syrian Observatory for Human Rights, another opposition group based in London.

== May 2012 ==
=== 1 May ===
The Local Coordination Committees of Syria (LCC) reported 45 people were killed, including 18 in a reported massacre in the Idlib province.

Hervé Ladsous, the United Nations (UN) Under-Secretary-General for Peacekeeping Operations, said that both sides had violated the 12 April ceasefire agreement.

=== 2 May ===
The UK-based Syrian Observatory for Human Rights (SOHR) reported that 15 Syrian troops, including two colonels, were killed in an ambush by rebels in the northern province of Aleppo. Two rebel fighters were also killed.

The New York-based Human Rights Watch (HRW) reported that government forces had killed at least 95 civilians and demolished hundreds of houses in a two-week offensive in Idlib during ceasefire negotiations. The report documented dozens of extrajudicial executions, killings of civilians, and destruction of civilian property that qualify as war crimes, as well as arbitrary detention and torture by the Syrian government.

30 people were killed across Syria, the LCC reported.

=== 3 May ===
25 people were reported killed by Syrian security forces, including at least 4 students from Aleppo University. Around 1,500 students had been protesting in student dormitories next to Aleppo university's main campus when security forces and Shabiha attacked them, firing tear gas and live ammunition to disperse the student protesters. 200 students were reportedly detained, and the university announced the suspension of all classes as a consequence of the attack on campus.

The White House Press Secretary Jay Carney said it may be time for the world to acknowledge the cease-fire in Syria is not holding and try a new approach to stopping the violence.

=== 4 May ===
Anti-government protesters took to the streets after Friday prayers, with the largest demonstrations occurring in Aleppo, Damascus, the Idlib and Daara provinces, and Homs and Hama. Syrian forces killed at least 12 people when they fired on demonstrators in Damascus and Aleppo. The LCC reported that 37 people were killed across Syria by the Syrian army.

Amnesty International senior crisis adviser Donatella Rovera, returning from a visit to Idlib, reported that Syrian forces were executing scores of suspected opposition sympathisers in Idlib.

Kofi Annan's spokesman Ahmad Fawzi told reporters in Geneva that the "peace plan is on track". US officials say the plan is failing mainly because of Syrian government violations.

=== 5 May ===
SOHR reported that at least 5 people were killed in a bomb explosion at a car wash in the Al Sukari neighborhood of Aleppo. A member of the Free Syrian Army claimed responsibility for the attack, saying the car wash was used by members of a pro-Assad militia.

Reuters reported that the Syrian army had not withdrawn tanks in Douma in line with 12 April truce agreement.

25 people were killed across Syria, the LCC reported.

=== 6 May ===
The Kuwait News Agency (KUNA) reported that 9 civilians, including a woman and child, were killed by Syrian government forces. In other incidents nationwide there were dozens of casualties as government forces shot randomly at protesters. The Local Coordination Committees of Syria (LCC) reported that 20 people were killed by the Syrian army including 8 bodies found in a mass grave in Idlib and a defected soldier.

=== 7 May ===
The LCC reported 35 people killed, this total including the discovery of a mass grave in Idlib.

=== 8 May ===
The LCC reported 36 people killed.

=== 9 May ===
The LCC reported 20 people killed. Several Syrian soldiers were killed by an ambush from the FSA as well.

=== 10 May ===
At least 55 people were killed and some 372 people injured by two powerful car bomb blasts in Damascus. Opposition groups denied responsibility while Haitham Maleh, a leading opposition figure, blamed the government. Media attention focused on the Al-Nusra Front, a little known jihadi-type group that had previously claimed responsibility for bombings in Damascus and Aleppo. Earlier in the week Maj. Gen. Robert Mood, head of the United Nations Truce Supervision Organization (UNTSO), had expressed worries that Syria was rushing into an uncontrollable spiral of sectarian violence and following the latest bombings urged the perpetrators to refrain from violence and let the peace process move forward.

The United Nations Security Council (UNSC) condemned the attacks and urged all sides to "immediately and comprehensively" implement the six-point peace plan of UN-Arab League envoy Kofi Annan. The Russian Foreign Minister Sergei Lavrov called the bombings the work of "outsiders", alleging that unspecified foreign states shared the blame. The LCC responded by asserting that the Syrian government had orchestrated and masterminded the bombings to bolster the Russian position. The United States Ambassador to the United Nations Susan Rice said that it was too early to call the peace plan a failure. She confirmed that the US was providing logistical and communication support to the Syrian opposition, but had shied away from providing arms.

Elsewhere, the LCC reported that 37 people were killed, including 10 in Homs.

=== 11 May ===
Anti-government protesters took to the streets after Friday prayers, with the largest demonstrations occurring in Aleppo, Damascus, the Idlib and Daara provinces, and Homs and Hama. Syrian forces killed at least 14 people by mid day when they fired on demonstrators in Damascus and Aleppo.

The Al-Nusra Front allegedly claimed responsibility for Thursday's twin bombings in Damascus in a video posted online.

The Al-Nusra Front however denied responsibility, saying the video was a fake and that any information regarding their operations would be announced through Jihadi forums. Al Nusra denied responsibility for the attack.

Two Turkish journalists arrested in March were released following Iranian mediation.

=== 12 May ===
The LCC reported 20 people killed by mid-day.

=== 13 May ===
The LCC reported 30 people killed.

=== 14 May ===
The LCC reported that at least 22 people were killed.

23 soldiers were killed by the FSA when the Syrian army attempted to assault Rastan, Homs Province. The Syrian army also began heavy artillery shelling of Rastan.

=== 15 May ===
At least 21 people were killed when Syrian security forces opened fire on a funeral procession in the central town of Khan Sheikhoun, during the U.N observer visit to the town. A spokesman of the rebel military council gave a higher death toll, saying at least 50 people were killed. During this attack, cars belonging to the U.N team were hit and damaged and no monitors were injured. One monitor and a member of the Free Syrian Army (FSA) said the team of seven observers was with FSA fighters, waiting for a U.N pickup.

The LCC reported that at least 63 people were killed, including 33 in Idlib.

=== 16 May ===
At least 40 people were killed, including 21 summarily executed in the Shammas neighborhood of Homs.

A former state Television producer has told Reuters that many of the "confessions" by alleged terrorists aired by the channel are bogus. She was distressed at what she described as a campaign of misinformation and said "Some of the men are just normal people who were arrested in anti-government demonstrations and others were thieves and criminals who were nearing the end of their sentence," said the producer, "They were told they will be set free if they confess to the made-up crimes."

=== 17 May ===
34 people were killed. The Syrian army barraged Rastan with artillery fire.

=== 18 May ===
Protesters took to the streets for weekly Friday protests, this time with the biggest protests at any single time in Aleppo. The Salahadin and Shukour neighborhoods saw tens of thousands, and tens of thousands more protested in the other area of Aleppo. Damascus and its suburbs, the Idlib and Daraa provinces, the Homs and Hama provinces, and Latakia and Deir Ezzor also saw large protests. Protesters were shot and killed across the country, including in the Tandamoun area of central Damascus. At least 33 people were killed by security forces by mid-day.

=== 19 May ===
A car bomb at an intelligence complex in the city of Deir al-Zour killed 9 members of the security forces and left 100 injured.

The LCC reported 26 people killed.

=== 20 May ===
During the very early morning the Free Syrian Army (FSA) launched widespread attacks against the Syrian government in Central Damascus. The Kafer Souseh, Mezzeh, Malki, and Ruk al Adn neighborhoods erupted with intense gunfire. Security forces began closing off Umayyad square and absereen square, and blocked of Central Damascus' Al-Shami Hospital. The Free Syrian Army's Damascus council announced that one of their operatives from the FSA's Al Sahabeh battalion had successfully poisoned all eight members of Bashar Assad's Crisis Cell, a group of top military officials who currently run the Syrian army's daily operations. Members of the Crisis cell include the interior and defense ministers, as well as Assef Shawkat. The Free Syrian Army's Damascus council said they believed at least six out of the eight to have been killed. Mohammed Shaar, the interior minister, apparently denied the assassinations by telephone, calling it "categorically baseless". He also denied the gunfire in Damascus which was confirmed by all witnesses.

Adib Habb al-Rumman, the head of Idlib's Jish Shugour's Baath party branch, was assassinated by the FSA, the SOHR reported. The SOHR also made note of increased political and military assassinations by the FSA in recent weeks.

At least 28 people were killed by mid-day in Syria, primarily in the Hama province. Soran, Hama, and Douma, Damascus, came under intense artillery shelling by the Syrian army. By the end of the day more than 60 people were killed nationwide, including 37 civilians in Soran.

=== 21 May ===
5 civilians, 11 rebels, and 22 soldiers were killed by mid-day. Much of the soldier deaths occurred when the Syrian army attempted to storm Atarib, Aleppo. The LCC reported 33 people killed by the end of day. According to S.O.H.R, 31 soldiers were killed by the end of the day.

=== 22 May ===
An IED exploded in the Damascus neighborhood of Qaboun, killing at least five people.

The LCC reported that at least 25 people killed.

=== 23 May ===
23 people were killed, including 6 in Homs.

=== 24 May ===
40 people were killed. 203 soldiers reportedly defected to the opposition, including 3 officers. An FSA officer said that the FSA was now present in all governorates and regions of Syria. A Brigadier General in the Syrian army who had defected to the FSA gave a speech in which he said that a safe zone or international intervention like air strikes was needed to stop what he called the genocide the Syrian army was committing in Syria.

=== 25 May ===
Protesters took to the streets for weekly Friday protests, amassing in Aleppo, Damascus and its suburbs, Homs, Hama, Qamishli, and the Daraa, Idlib, and Deir Ezzor provinces. Tens of thousands protested in central Aleppo, to which security forces responded with live fire, killing several.

Maj. Gen. Robert Mood, head of the United Nations Truce Supervision Organization (UNTSO), confirmed opposition group claims that at least 90 civilians were killed, including 32 children in Houla, Homs province. General Mood declared the killings "indiscriminate and unforgivable" without explaining how they happened, but said the violence had begun Friday evening with the use of "tanks, artillery, rocket-propelled grenades, and heavy machine guns", implying an attack by government forces since the FSA do not possess heavy weaponry. The official news agency of the Syrian government alleged that "Al-Qaeda terrorist groups" were responsible for the killings, while opposition groups alleged that the Syrian military and government-linked militias known as Shabiha were the perpetrators. The Syrian National Council (SNC), Syria's main opposition bloc, put the death toll at more than 110 people, half of them children. State media claimed 17 had been killed. A further 43 people were killed according to the LCC.

On the same day, United Nations Secretary General Ban Ki-moon blamed the Syrian government for the "unacceptable levels of violence and abuses" occurring every day in Syria. Ban cited the government's continued use of heavy weapons, reports of shelling and "a stepped-up security crackdown by the authorities that has led to massive violations of human rights by government forces and pro-government militias". He said there was only "small progress" in implementing the UN peace plan.

=== 26 May ===
The UK Foreign Secretary William Hague called for an urgent session of the UNSC following Friday's "appalling crime" at Houla. He urged the regime to grant full and immediate access to Houla for UN monitors and stop all military options, as demanded by special envoy Kofi Annan. However General Mustafa Ahmed al-Sheikh, head of the Turkey-based Free Syria Army (FSA) military council, said regime opponents had lost all faith in the UN Security Council, on which Damascus has Russia as a powerful backer (see also Russia–Syria relations).

65 people were killed across the country, including 25 in Homs.

=== 27 May ===
The Syrian army engaged in heavy artillery shelling in Hama and the Damascus suburbs. The clashes in Hama started after the rebels attacked government military checkpoints. According to opposition claims, after the military reportedly suffered four dead, the government troops started to shell residential areas, killing 30-37 civilians.

51 people were reported killed by the end of the day, according to the LCC.

=== 28 May ===
The Syrian army killed 28 people by the late afternoon, including 9 in Hama. At the same time, the conflict has started moving into the two largest cities (Damascus and Aleppo) that the government claimed was being dominated by the silent majority, which wanted stability, not government change. In both places there has been a revival of the protest movement in its peaceful dimension. Shopkeepers across the capital staged a general strike and in several Aleppo commercial districts mounted a similar but smaller protest. This has been interpreted by some as indicating that the historical alliance between the government and the business establishment in the large cities has become weak.

=== 29 May ===
Another mass execution was discovered near the eastern city of Deir ez-Zor. The unidentified corpses of 13 men had been discovered shot to death execution-style. This incident raised awareness that the violence in Syria was heading towards an inexorable vicious cycle of tit-for-tat attacks between the different parties involved. According to the opposition, the 13 people who were shot at point blank range and later found in a field were employees at the electricity company in Deir Ezzor, who went on strike in protest of the massacres committed by the Syrian regime. They all had their hands tied behind their backs and were shot in the head according to a UN report. The head of a UN observer mission in Syria was "deeply disturbed" by the killings in Deir Ezzor, calling it an "appalling and inexcusable act". Several days later, the dead were identified to be military and the opposition than claimed they were army defectors killed by government forces. However, on 5 June, the jihadist group the Al-Nusra Front to Protect the Levant claimed responsibility for the killings, stating that they had captured and interrogated the soldiers in Deir al-Zor and "justly" punished them with death, after they confessed to crimes.

=== 30 May ===
Early in the day 46 people were killed, including 10 in Douma, Damascus.

The Free Syrian Army announced that they were giving president Bashar al-Assad a 48-hour deadline to abide by an international peace plan to end violence. "It ends on Friday at 1200 (0900 GMT) then we are free from any commitment and we will defend and protect the militants, their villages and their cities.", the FSA spokesperson is quoted saying.

Syria's Consul General Hazem Chehabi of the Syrian American Council defected in California. He said that the Houla Massacre had been a tipping point and he could no longer support the "barbaric Syrian regime".

Meanwhile, Syrian Army forces attacked Tadlu, Houla, the site of the Houla massacre days before.

Machinegun fire was followed by shelling, forcing villagers to flee heavy shelling in fear of more carnage.

=== 31 May ===
61 people were killed, including 29 in Homs.

An army sniper killed a boy in Taldou, Houla, where the Houla massacre took place. "Frightened residents of the area fled" for nearby towns, according to SOHR.

== June 2012 ==
The first weekend of June witnessed the death of 80 security personnel throughout Syria.

=== 1 June ===
Protesters took to the streets for weekly Friday protests with the largest protests occurring in Aleppo, Damascus, Hama, Homs, idlib, Daraa, and the Deir Ezzor province. 43 were killed, including 13 in the Damascus suburbs.

13 people were killed in another mass execution by the Syrian army in Qusayr. The opposition reported 13 men were on their way to work at a state-owned fertilizer factory in Qusayr near the city of Homs when they came under fire.

SOHR reports that 17 law enforcers were killed across the country in an explosion in Idlib, and clashes elsewhere.

Additionally, SANA reports that 22 security forces were 'laid to rest' (including: Retired Captain Taghreed Shahi Hamdan, First Lieutenant Alaa Fayssal Jamous and Second Lieutenant Issam Nabih Abu Aqel.)

=== 2 June ===
A total of 96 people were killed on Saturday according to SOHR. SOHR reported that the total number of civilian casualties for the day was 33. 2 army defectors were killed in Rastan and Homs. A total of 61 soldiers killed throughout the day in, predominantly, explosions; ambushes and clashes. Al Jazeera reported that Saturday was the worst day for Syrian security forces since the start of the uprising

29 people were killed, including 12 in Homs.

=== 3 June ===
By evening at least 42 people were killed, primarily in Idlib and Homs.

At least 80 Syrian soldiers were killed by the FSA over the weekend, the Syrian Observatory for Human Rights said, citing local doctors, who confirmed this and their names. This was while the opposition Free Syrian army said that they had killed more than 100 soldiers and destroyed some tanks over the weekend.

=== 4 June ===
42 people were killed, including 16 in the Idlib province.

=== 5 June ===
51 people were killed by evening, including 12 in Haffeh, Latakia.

=== 6 June ===
78 civilians were executed in a massacre by the Syrian army and Shabiha in the small village of Qubair, part of Maarzaf, Hama province, with 47 bodies identified so far. Over 140 people were killed across Syria, including in the Qubair and Maarzaf massacres. The village of Qubair is located directly east of Asilah and Abu Rubays.

One Lebanese man was killed and two-three were wounded in a gunfight with Syrian security forces while they were trying to infiltrate Syria across the border from Lebanon at the town of Arsal. The soldiers were apparently waiting for the infiltrators to ambush them. The wounded were reportedly missing after the incident.

=== 7 June ===
Observers attempting to reach the site of the massacre in Qubair were shot at by government soldiers, and forced to turn back.

31 people were killed, as reported by SOHR. 24 Syrian soldiers were killed by the FSA including an assassination on a Major General (which also killed a military judge) in Dera'a.

=== 8 June ===
Fierce fighting between the FSA and Assad loyalists erupted in central Damascus, as protesters took to the streets for weekly Friday protests. The largest protests occurred in Damascus, Aleppo, Hama, the Idlib, Homs, Daraa, and Deir Ezzor provinces. At least 20 people were killed by the evening. The Syrian army continued heavy shelling on central Homs.

By the end of the day 65 people were killed, including 17 in the Idlib province.

UN Secretary-General Ban Ki-moon told the UN security council that heavy weapons, armor-piercing bullets and surveillance drones have been used against UN observers in Syria to hamper their efforts to monitor the conflict, and that these tactics had been used to try to force the unarmed monitors to withdraw from areas where government forces have been accused of staging attacks. monitors also saw Syrian military convoys and tried to stop tank assaults against populated areas, but had been "ignored".

British journalist Alex Thompson claims to have been set up in a death trap by members of the FSA who tried to have him killed by members of the Syrian Army for propaganda purposes.

A video was leaked online, which purported to show soldiers mocking the dead in a town in Idlib. They were shown to be piling corpses in a building, and blowing it up afterwards.

=== 9 June ===
Activists said Syrian troops killed at least 17 people in the southern city of Daraa, including women and children. The Britain-based Syrian Observatory for Human Rights and the Local Coordination Committees told that dozens of people were also wounded in the shelling early on 9 June.

According to SANA, 57 soldiers, police officer and other law enforcement members killed by rebels were buried during the week.

By the end of the day the LCC reported 96 people killed, primarily in Daraa and Homs. The SOHR reports that 84 were killed; 70 people were killed across the country including 29 in Homs. Bombardment took place in Homs, Dera'a, Latakia and Idlib provinces. 13 rebel fighters died across the country, including 10 in clashes in Homs province. A total of 28 Syrian soldiers were killed following clashes across the country.

=== 10 June ===
By the end of the day LCC reports that 53 people were killed, including 26 from shelling in Homs. SOHR reported that a total of 41 people were killed across the country. At least 16 soldiers were killed across the country.

Dozens of Kuwaitis were reported to have joined the FSA according to the Al-Qabas newspaper

The FSA reported that they briefly took the al-Ghanto air-defense base north of Homs that held advanced surface-to-air missiles and antiaircraft vehicles. FSA commanders described in a series of online videos the organized defection of soldiers and officers from the base and the subsequent government attack that followed. The FSA claimed that they seized a number of weapons and ammunition, and that a large part of the base and its arsenal of weapons were destroyed in bombing by government helicopters that were used to retake the air-defense base.

=== 11 June ===
United Nations monitors confirmed that Syrian army helicopters fired on towns near Homs, including Rastan. For the first time, the UN also verified repeated allegations by activists that government forces fired from helicopters in the military crackdown on dissent. Kofi Annan said he was "gravely concerned" at this news and a UN spokeswoman said that "artillery and mortar shelling, machine guns and smaller arms" were being used against the towns of Rastan and Talbiseh.

The US said that it feared the Syrian government was planning a "new massacre" in al-Heffa, where a battle had been taking place that had killed 68 soldiers, 29 civilians and 23 rebel fighters. The city endured heavy shelling from the army. The FSA said that they moved civilians away from the city centre to protect them, but even the outskirts were shelled eventually.

109 people were killed by the evening, including 36 in Idlib, of which a dozen were summarily executed.

SOHR reports the total death toll of civilians as 80 (excluding 2 rebels included in the count by SOHR), including 25 in Idlib province and 9 civilians slain in a car bomb in Dera'a province. At least 7 rebel fighters with killed, including 2 during clashes in Homs. In addition, 23 soldiers and a Ba'ath Party official were slain across the country.

=== 12 June ===
Herve Ladsous, the head of the UN's Department of Peacekeeping Operations, stated that the uprising has amounted for a full-scale civil war.

LCC reports that 60 people were killed by evening, including 23 in Homs and 16 in Deir Ezzor from heavy artillery shelling.

17 soldiers were killed in clashes throughout the country and when a military bus was targeted in Rif Dimashq.

Dr. Marwan Arafat, the previous president of the Syrian Football Federation, was assassinated.

=== 13 June ===
Riad al-As'ad from the Free Syrian Army announced that the FSA had made a tactical withdrawal from Al Heffeh Latakia.

LCC reports that 77 people were killed, including 23 in Homs, 12 in Hama and 10 in Deir Ezzor from heavy artillery shelling.

SOHR said at least 51 people were slain by evening, including 20 in Homs, largely due to military bombardment. 6 people were killed in each of: Idlib, Dera'a and Hama provinces. In addition, at least 9 rebel fighters were killed, including a rebel leader in Deir Ezzor.

At least 21 soldiers were killed across the country.

=== 14 June ===
LCC reported that 60 people were killed by the evening, including 19 in Homs and 19 in a massacre perpetrated by Shabiha in the Damascus suburb of Hamourieh.

SOHR reported that 51 people were slain including 21 in Rif Dimashq and 15 in Homs. In addition, at least 11 rebels were killed, including 6 in the town of Heit, Dera'a. An officer was killed in Homs province. 24 soldiers were killed, including at least 11 killed in clashes in eastern Ghouta.

UN monitors were met with the 'stench of death' as they entered the deserted town of al-Heffa after having been shelled for 8 consecutive days.

A bomb blew up a vehicle near the shrine of Zaynab bint Ali, the granddaughter of Muhammed; damaging the shrine and wounding 10 people.

=== 15 June ===
LCC reports that at least 48 people were killed by evening as protesters took to the streets, with protesting occurring primarily in Damascus and its suburbs, Aleppo, and the Idlib, Daara, Hama, Homs, and Deir Ezzor provinces.

SOHR reports the deaths of 30 people; including a civilian journalist in Homs province. 2 defected soldiers were killed in Homs. 8 soldiers were also killed.

=== 16 June ===
LCC reports that 77 people were killed evening, primarily in Damascus and Homs.

SOHR reports that 59 people were slain across the country; 34 in Damascus province, 15 in Homs province. 2 rebels died in Dera'a, including a defected lieutenant.

16 soldiers of the Syrian government were killed throughout the day.

Meanwhile, the Free Syrian Army announced that it regained control over al-Bayada.

The UN announced that they are suspending activities in Syria due to the increase in violence.

=== 17 June ===
LCC reported that 60 people were killed by evening, including 17 in the Damascus suburbs and 15 in Homs. Rastan, Talbiseh and central Homs came under renewed massive artillery shelling.

SOHR reported the deaths of 43 people; including 13 in Reef Damashq and 13 in Homs due to regime bombardment. At least 2 fighters were slain in clashes in Homs province.

26 law-enforcers were killed; including a lieutenant assassinated in Damascus.

=== 18 June ===
LCC reported that by night at least 90 people were killed, primarily in Homs and Damascus.

SOHR reported the deaths of 56 people; including 19 in Reef Damascus and 7 in Dera'a Province. At least 13 rebels were slain across the country; 2 rebel commanders in Deir Ezzor and 2 defected first sergeants in Homs and Reef Damascus.

28 soldiers were killed; primarily in overnight clashes.

It was reported that two Russian warships are headed to Syria, according to a Russian officer, each capable of carrying 300 marines and a dozen tanks, making it the largest deployment from Russia to Syria to date. Russia also has an unspecified number of military advisers teaching Syrians how to use Russian weapons.

The United Kingdom said it had withdrawn insurance for a Russian ship that was reportedly carrying attack helicopters destined for the Syrian Government. UK Foreign Secretary William Hague said the ship was returning to Russia and said that "We discourage anyone else from supplying arms to Syria."

=== 19 June ===
LCC reported 52 people were killed, including 10 in Homs.

SOHR reported the deaths of 46 opposition members; at least 6 were rebel fighters, the rest were civilians. 14 were killed in Homes and 16 in Damascus Province.

At least 27 soldiers were killed across the country.

The FSA called on their "Kurdish brothers" to join rebels fighting President Bashar al-Assad's regime, while promising an end to injustices against Kurds in a future democratic Syria. The spokesperson for the joint command of the FSA said; ""The Joint Command of the Free Syrian Army ... appeals to our Kurdish brothers, soldiers and civilians, and invites them to join the ranks of the FSA inside the country, let us work together to transform the FSA into an alternative national military institution to the army of the ruling gang." The statement also emphasized that kurds are and have always been "partners" working "hand-in-hand to build the country's future and end discrimination for all Syrians, whatever their ethnic or religious background." The head of the Syrian National council is a Kurdish activist.

Clashes erupted at the Kurdish Mountain area in Latakia Governorate. A series of confrontations between the Syrian Army and the rebel Free Syrian Army (FSA) resulted in multiple casualties. A rebel leader claimed that clashes resulted in 5 rebels killed, while 28 Syrian soldiers were killed, dozens wounded and several captured by the next day.

=== 20 June ===
LCC reported that 66 people were killed throughout Syria by the Syrian army, including 17 in the Damascus suburbs.

SOHR reported the deaths of 46 people; including 16 in Hama and 10 in Damascus Province. In addition, Sayyed Abdul Quddous Jebara (a Shia cleric) was assassinated in Damascus Province. 8 rebels were slain; including 5 killed in Latakia and a defected lieutenant in Madaya.

35 law-enforcers were killed across the country, in addition to an officer assassinated in Damascus.

=== 21 June ===
A Syrian MiG-21 pilot defected to Jordan with his plane, the country later granted colonel Hassan Hamada political asylum.

SOHR reported the deaths of at least 121 people were killed, including 107 people, with 32 killed in Homs and 30 in Damascus Province, one of the highest death tolls in the entire uprising. In addition, at least 10 rebels were slain; including 5 in Dera'a and a defected officer in Idlib.

54 law-enforcers were killed, primarily in clashes.

The LCC reported that over 128 people were killed by the end of the day, primarily in the Damascus suburbs, Hama, and Daara.

=== 22 June ===
Protests were widespread after Friday prayers, occurring primarily in Central Aleppo and Damascus and its suburbs, as well as the Homs, Hama, Idlib, Daara, and Deir Ezzor governorates. 87 people were killed by security forces and the Syrian army by the evening, primarily in the Damascus suburbs and including at least 15 in Aleppo city.

Syrian army shot down a Turkish F-4 Phantom fighter jet near the Turkish/Syrian border.

SOHR reported the deaths of 59 people; including 11 in a demonstration in Aleppo. Between 6-10 rebels were slain; including 2 in Homs and a defected captain.

A total of 41 soldiers were killed; including 26 Shabiha killed in West Aleppo Province.

The largest single officer defection took place; 5 officers, from Idlib province, announced their defection; 2 brigadier generals, 2 colonels and a fighter pilot defected.

=== 23 June ===
LCC reported the deaths of 131 people were killed by the end of the day, including 31 in Deir Ezzor, 26 in the Damascus suburbs, and 24 in Idlib.

SOHR reported the deaths of 76 people; 22 in Deir Ezzor and 15 in Homs. At least 9 rebels were killed, including a defected corporal was also killed in Latakia.

28 soldiers were killed by the end of the day, according to SOHR.

10 soldiers were executed for attempting to defect from the army.

Three more fighter pilots from the Syrian Army defected, crossing the border to Jordan.

=== 24 June ===
LCC reported that at least 82 people were killed, including 23 in Deir Ezzor and 14 in Hama.

55 people were killed, according to SOHR; including 19 in Deir Izzor; primarily due to bombardment on the city. At least 13 rebels were slain; including a defected sergeant and a defected first lieutenant in Deir Izzor.

28 law-enforcers were slain; 27 during clashes and 1 in an IED attack.

=== 25 June ===
7 doctors in Aleppo were arrested, tortured, and burned alive by Syrian intelligence officers.

40 soldiers, including a general and two colonels, defected from the Syrian army and crossed the border to Turkey with their families. This was while a General of the FSA said that government forces are preparing to carry out a new massacre in Homs.

Turkey accused Syria of firing at a second Turkish military jet aircraft, days after Syria shot down a Turkish F-4 jet.

SOHR reported the deaths of 61 people; 15 in Deir Ezzor, 17 in Dera'a. Regime forces bombarded a refugee camp and massacred a family of 4 in Dera'a. At least 5 rebels were slain.

31 soldiers were killed; including in IED attacks in Idlib and Dera'a.

LCC reported that by the end of the day 80 people were killed, including 20 in a massacre in Daara, and 17 from artillery shelling in Deir Ezzor. Also, 7 doctors in Aleppo were arrested, tortured, and burned alive by Syrian intelligence officers.

=== 26 June ===
LCC reported that 113 people were killed by evening, including 33 in Quddasaya and al Hami Damascus, and 16 in Daara.

SOHR reported that 83 people were killed; including 28 in Damascus Suburbs and 19 in Idlib Province. At least 7 rebels died in fighting around the country; including a defected captain killed in Hama Province.

46 soldiers were killed across the country; mostly in clashes with rebels.

280 soldiers and officers defected in Idlib near the main highway leading to Aleppo whilst clashes between the defectors and the Syrian army resulted in one helicopter shot down and six tanks destroyed.

Burhan Ghalioun was reported to have been smuggled into Syria to meet with rebel forces in order to raise morale.

=== 27 June ===
A group of Syrian rebels attacked a pro-government TV station in the town of Drousha, just south of the capital Damascus. The station's studios were destroyed with explosives. Seven people were killed in the attack on Al-Ikhbariya TV, including four guards and three journalists. The Free Syrian Army rebels claimed that defectors from Syria's elite Republican Guard were behind the attack. However, this was later found to be untrue after the radical Islamist group, the Al-Nusra Front to Protect the Levant, confirmed it carried out the attack and published photos of 11 station employees they kidnapped following the raid.

LCC reported that 104 people were killed by the end of the day, including 42 in Idlib and 15 in the Damascus suburbs.

SOHR reported a death toll of 73 people by evening; 29 in Idlib and 14 in Deir Ezzor. At least 15 rebels were slain; 5 in Dera'a and 9 in Idlib (including a commander). A citizen from Dera'a was excessively tortured, by regime forces, until death.

At least 57 soldiers were killed; including many in an attack on heavy military vehicles in Idlib.

=== 28 June ===
Two car bombs were detonated in Damascus, one in the car park of the Palace of Justice and the other targeting a police station. 3 people were injured and several vehicles damaged.

LCC reported that by the end of the day over 139 people were killed, suspected perpetrator was the Syrian army, including over 40 from the artillery shelling and summarily executions in Douma.

SOHR reported the deaths of 103 people; including 41 in Damascus Suburbs (35 in Douma due to bombardment) and 17 in Homs. Ahlam Khalid Imad, a lecturer at the Baath university, was killed (along with her family) in Al-Husun, Homs. A sheikh, Mohammed Nour Zanzoul, was killed by security forces in Hama. At least 14 rebels were slain; 8 in Homs. A defected captain was killed in Idlib.

58 law-enforcers were killed; including a lieutenant colonel, a lieutenant and two officers.

=== 29 June ===
"Massive" protests erupted across the central neighborhoods and suburban neighborhoods of Damascus, Aleppo city, Hama, and the Homs, Daara, and Idlib provinces.

The Free Syrian army captured a major general, Farag Shehada, head of central command in the Syrian Armed Forces. This is thought to be the highest-ranking official to be captured. Cooper 2015 said that Shehada was the commander of the 1st Corps (Syria). Another brigadier general in the intelligence department was captured.

By the end of the day LCC reported 104 people killed by security forces and the Syrian army. 9 of which in Souran, Hama were knifed to death in a massacre suspected to be perpetrated by shabiha.

SOHR reported the deaths of around 47 people; including 10 in Deir Izzor and Damascus Suburbs. At least 9 rebels were slain; including 5 bodies found dead in Kafar Shams, Dera'a.

23 law-enforcers were killed; 5 in an attack on a military truck in Latakia.

=== 30 June ===
By the end of the day, LCC reported 174 people killed by security forces and the Syrian army including 85 people in a massacre in Zamalka, Damascus suburbs.

SOHR reported the deaths of 90 people; 41 in Damascus Suburbs and 13 in Deir Ezzor. 30 civilians were killed during an explosion that targeted a funeral procession in Zamalka, Damascus Suburbs. 2 doctors were killed in Damascus and Deir Ezzor. An activist was also killed in Hama. A total of 11 rebels were killed; including 4 in Dera'a and a defected first sergeant in Deir Ezzor.

27 soldiers were killed during clashes and during an assault on a military truck in Rankous.

== July 2012 ==
=== 1 July ===
69 people were killed, including 14 in the Damascus suburbs.

=== 2 July ===
By evening the Syrian army killed at least 114 people, including 30 in the Damascus suburbs, 27 in Hama and 23 in Homs. 85 Syrian Army soldiers, including a General, a Colonel, and other ranking officers, defected to Turkey along with their families. Other accounts said that there was no general amongst the defectors.

=== 3 July ===
LCC reported the deaths of 71 people were killed, including 14 in Deir Ezzor and 13 in Homs.

SOHR reported the deaths of 52 people; 15 in Damascus Countryside, 10 in Homs and 10 in Dera'a. 7 rebels were killed; 4 in Homs and 2 in Douma.

25 Syrian soldiers were killed throughout the country.

=== 4 July ===
A Free Syrian Army spokesman claimed that opposition forces were in control of around 40% of Syria, although others claimed that up to 60% was out of government hands.

The bodies of two Turkish air force pilots shot down by Syrian forces were discovered by an American deep sea exploration vessel.

LCC reported the deaths of 70 people were killed, including 17 in Idlib.

SOHR reported the deaths of 55 people by evening; 15 in Idlib and 11 in Damascus Countryside. 8 were killed during regime bombardment on Al Misraba in Damascus Countryside. 10 rebels were killed; 4 in Homs. A leader of a rebel battalion was slain in Hama Province and another commander killed during bombardment in Idlib.

34 soldiers were killed; including 3 high-ranking officers.

=== 5 July ===
63 civilians were killed; 28 in Idlib and 11 in Damascus Countryside. 2 civilians were killed by an IED in As-Suwayda Governorate. 3 rebels were slain; a rebel leader was shot by a sniper in Ariha. A leader of a rebel battalion was slain in Dera'a.

24 soldiers were killed; a brigadier-general was assassinated in Homs Province.

=== 6 July ===
Protests were widespread after Friday prayers, occurring primarily in Central Aleppo and Damascus and its suburbs, as well as the Homs, Hama, Idlib, Daara, and Deir Ezzor governorates. At least 89 people were killed in clashes by noon.

The Syrian Army captured the rebel-held town of Khan Sheikhoun in Idlib province after opposition forces retreated the previous night.

A high-ranking military official and brigade commander in the Republican Guard, Manaf Tlass, son of the former defense minister Mustafa Tlass, defected to Turkey. This was because anger over civilian deaths during the uprising.

SOHR reported the deaths of 67 civilians; 13 in Damascus Countryside and 11 in Homs. 5 civilians were killed during regime bombardment of Nawa. 6 rebels were slain; 3 in Idlib.

27 soldiers were killed, including a first lieutenant in Aleppo.

=== 7 July ===
LCC reported the deaths of 71 people were killed by the end of the day, including 21 in Deir Ezzor.

SOHR reported the deaths of 37 civilians; 15 in Deir Ezzor and 6 in Hama. Also, 5 bodies were found in Hamourieh. 13 rebels were slain; 5 in Aleppo. A defected lieutenant was killed in Aleppo, a defected lieutenant colonel was blown up in Idlib and a defected first sergeant was killed in Damascus Countryside.

21 soldiers were killed.

Rebels downed a surveillance aircraft, marking an increase in rebel military capabilities.

=== 8 July ===
LCC reported the deaths of 57 civilians and 3 rebels were killed by evening, primarily in the Damascus suburbs and Homs.

SOHR reported the deaths of 53 civilians; 11 in Hama and 9 in Deir Ezzor. A doctor was assassinated in Damascus. 17 rebels were slain; 5 in Homs. A rebel leader was killed during an opposition operation in Dera'a Province.

36 soldiers were killed across the country.

=== 9 July ===
51 civilians were killed by the evening; 10 in Idlib and 7 in Aleppo. 5 rebels were killed along with a defected soldier.

36 soldiers killed; including an officer killed in an attack in Idlib. 10 soldiers were killed, in Deir Izzor, when a procession of military vehicles was targeted.

NBC reports that the rebels have gained significant territory over the past few weeks, and now control much of the rural countryside.

=== 10 July ===
68 civilians were killed by the end of the day, including 19 in Deir Ezzor and 11 in the Damascus suburbs.

18 soldiers and 9 rebels were killed by the end of the day.

=== 11 July ===
The Syrian ambassador to Iraq, Nawaf al-Fares defected to the opposition. He is the most senior diplomat to defect so far in the entire conflict. He gave a statement to Al Jazeera, saying "I urge all honest members of this party to follow my path because the regime has turned it to an instrument to kill people and their aspiration to freedom." Fares also called upon the military to join the ranks of the Syrian revolution. His defection dealt a "moral and political blow" to the Syrian Government and another diplomat, the Syrian ambassador to Sweden, Mohammad Bassam Imadi defected in December 2011.

78 people were killed by the end of the day, including 22 in Homs and 13 members of the Palestinian liberation army.

28 soldiers were killed; including three officers. 9 rebels and 44 civilians were killed; according to SOHR.

=== 12 July ===
Following a rebel ambush against a military convoy near Hama, the military made a counter-attack that led to the Battle of Tremseh with the Free Syrian Army in Tremseh, leading to a reported death of dozens of rebels, and an unknown number of civilians. Two days later, the UN observer mission issued a statement, based on the investigation by its team that went to the town, that the Syrian military mainly targeted the homes of rebels and activists, in what the BBC said was a contradiction of the initial opposition claims of a civilian massacre. They said that the number of casualties was unclear and added that they intend to return to the town to continue their investigation.

Four days after the battle, the Free Syrian Army backtracked on their initial death toll of 200, saying it had been overblown because many of the wounded were counted as dead, and reduced the list of those confirmed killed to 68-103 names. But still, activist Abu Adnan, continued to claim 150 died, with the rest of the bodies allegedly being unidentifiable or stolen by the military during their assault.

In all the LCC reported 287 people killed across Syria.

=== 13 July ===
US officials say that Syria is moving chemical weapons out of storage.

71 people were killed by Syrian army gunfire and shelling, primarily in Idlib and Homs.

"Massive" demonstration came out against the Syrian government in Aleppo, with other big protests occurring in Damascus, its suburbs, Hama, Daara, and the Idlib and Deir Ezzor province.

SOHR reported the deaths of 59 civilians; 13 in Damascus and 12 in Idlib. 32 rebels were slain; including a first lieutenant in Aleppo. 18 fighters were killed in Idlib Province during regime assaults on villages in the area.

37 soldiers were killed across the country.

=== 14 July ===
SOHR reported the deaths of 49 civilians by evening; 13 in the Damascus Countryside and 11 in Deir Ezzor. An IED explosion hit the Fatima al-Saqqa school, in the al-Karama neighbourhood of Hama, killing 4 civilians including 2 children. 24 rebels were slain throughout the country; 8 in Aleppo. 10 rebels were killed in Homs; including a defected lieutenant colonel. A defected first sergeant was also killed in Deir Ezzor.

39 Syrian soldiers were killed; 13 were killed in Aleppo, including an officer. 12 soldiers were killed during an attack on a ZiL truck in Idlib Province.

75 civilians were killed by the end of the day, including 20 in Homs.

=== 15 July ===
The International Committee of the Red Cross announced today that fighting is now so widespread in Syria that the situation is to be regarded as a civil war. The rebels have started today the operation to liberate Damascus, an operation called "Damascus volcano and Syrian earthquake".

SOHR reported the deaths of 59 civilians by evening; 16 in Homs, 8 in Dera'a and 8 in Deir Ezzor. A nurse was tortured to death, by security services, in al-Qouriya, Deir Ezzor. A refugee camp was bombarded in Dera'a, killing one. 16 rebels were slain; 2 rebel fighters, including the leader of a battalion, were killed during clashes by the al-Omar oil field, Deir Ezzor.

41 soldiers were killed across the country. By the end of the day the LCC reported 72 people dead, primarily in Homs, Hama, and Idlib.

=== 16 July ===
For a second day, heavy clashes in the southern Midan and Tadhamon districts of Damascus raged with the military managing to surround the rebel forces in the area and sending tanks and other armored vehicles into the neighborhoods. The rebels called the clashes a raid by them against the capital, while the government called it a 48-hour military operation to clear the area of any opposition forces. There were also indications that the government knew about the planned rebel raid and acted on the information. According to state TV, the military killed over 80 rebel fighters during the fighting. On their part, the rebels would claim, by the following day, to have killed 70 soldiers and pro-government militiamen and that they had shot down a military helicopter.

Morocco expelled the Syrian ambassador from their country, Syria retaliated by declaring the Moroccan ambassador there persona non grata.

By the end of the day, the LCC reported 97 killed, including 30 in Hama, 21 in Homs, 13 in Aleppo, 11 in Damascus, 8 in Daraa, 7 in Deir Ezzor, 4 in the suburbs of Damascus, and 3 in Idlib.

SOHR reported the deaths of 84 civilians, including 43 in Hama. 34 of these were slain in al-Hamidiyeh neighbourhood due to regime advancements. 14 civilians were killed in Homs. 28 rebels were slain; 5 defectors were executed in a medical complex in Hama.

41 soldiers were killed, including 2 officers, throughout the country.

The former head of Syria's chemical weapons, Major General Adnan Silu, defected to the opposition. Silu said that the rebels controlled 60 per cent of the country and that all they needed was limited military intervention from NATO to help them topple President Bashar al-Assad. "All we need from NATO are two air attacks on the presidential palace to topple the regime and we will be able to control all the Syrian cities," Silu told Asharq al-Awsat.

Two Iraqi journalists were shot and stabbed in Damascus and then handed over to an Iraqi border post by Syrian intelligence and police. A total of 525 Syrians, including several military officers who defected from the Syrian army, fled to Turkey on Monday. This included a brigadier general, bring the number of defected generals staying in Turkey to 18.

=== 17 July ===
The Israeli army intelligence chief said on Tuesday that Syrian army forces has moved from the Golan Heights area next to Israel toward Damascus and other internal conflict zones.

SOHR reported the deaths of 54 civilians; 9 in Homs and 8 in the Damascus countryside. 16 civilians were slain in the city of Damascus, 12 in the Qaboun neighborhood which is witnessing heavy fighting. An Egyptian national was among the dead. 20 rebels were slain; a defected captain was killed along with 2 defected soldiers in Aleppo province. A defected sergeant major was tortured to death in Dera'a. 3 defected officers were killed during an explosion in Yabrud. A defected first sergeant was slain in Homs. 29 soldiers were killed.

=== 18 July ===
According to Turkish officials, two Syrian brigadier-generals were among some 600 Syrians who fled from Syria to Turkey overnight, bringing the total number of defected generals to twenty. Orient TV reported that Syrian vice president Farouk al-Sharaa, along with 13 other officers, had defected to neighboring Jordan.

A suicide blast at a National Security Building in Rawda Square in Damascus seriously wounded several Syrian government officials and killed Syrian defense minister General Daoud Rajha, Syrian president Bashar Al Assad's security advisor Hasan Turkmani, and President Assad's brother-in-law, who was also deputy defense minister, Assef Shawkat. The interior minister, Mohammad Ibrahim al-Shaar, was also killed in the blast. It was alleged the explosion was caused by a suicide bomber who had worked as a bodyguard for President Assad's inner circle. The Syrian opposition claimed responsibility for the attack; the FSA claiming that the explosion was remote-controlled and not a suicide attack.

According to Syrian state television, General Fahd Jassem al-Freij, previously the Chief-of-Staff of the Armed Forces, was appointed as the new Defense Minister.

The U.S Department of Treasury announced new sanctions, specifically targeting individuals within the Assad regime.

By the end of the day, 188 civilians were killed, including 60 civilians in Set Zaynab, Damascus when helicopters shelled a funeral. SOHR said that 62 government soldiers and 28 rebels were killed throughout the day.

=== 19 July ===
Assets worth £100 million belonging to Syrian leaders were reported located and frozen in Britain.

The Kurdish city of Ayn al-Arab was taken over, peacefully, by the Kurdish Popular Defense Committees, after the Syrian military pulled out of the town. Rebels claimed full control over the town of Azaz in the Aleppo Province. Reportedly, rebels had taken control of the majority of the city back in March.

Three border crossings with neighboring Turkey fell under rebel control. Al Jazeera confirmed that the Bab al Hawa crossing was amongst others to be within rebels hands the next day.

According to Iraq's deputy interior minister, Adnan al-Assadi, Syrian rebels took control of all border crossings (though not all border outposts) between Iraq and Syria. 22 border guards, including their commander, were reportedly captured at one post and executed while Iraqi border troops watched from the other side of the border.

Both Russia and China were alone in vetoing the third UN Security Council resolution which would have enacted Chapter 7 consequences against the Assad regime for non-compliance. All other UNSC votes were in favor, except for two abstentions. The UK Foreign Secretary, William Hague, condemned the Russian and Chinese veto as "inexcusable and indefensible".

By the end of the day, LCC reported the deaths of 217 civilians were killed, including 70 from Deir Ezzor and 40 from greater Damascus area.

SOHR reported a huge death toll of over 280 deaths. 124 civilians were killed; 33 in Damascus Countryside and a further 10 in Damascus City. 20 civilians were slain due to mortar fire on the town of Irbeen, in Damascus Countryside, alone. A car bomb exploded in Jdeida al-Khas, Damascus Countryside, killing a child. 22 civilians were killed in Deir Ezzor and 14 in Hama. An additional 14 were slain in Homs Province; including a citizen journalist.

63 rebels were slain; 15 in Hama and 15 in Idlib. 14 were slain in the Damascus Countryside. 6 rebels were killed in Homs Province, including a rebel commander.

98 soldiers were killed.

=== 20 July ===
More than 30,000 Syrians crossed into Lebanon between Thursday and Friday.

"Massive" demonstrations against the Syrian government occurred after Friday prayers, most notably in the center districts of Aleppo and Damascus cities, their suburbs, and the Idlib, Hama, Daara and Homs provinces.

LCC reported the deaths of 215 civilians killed's artillery shelling. 55 were killed in the Damascus suburbs, and 26 in Damascus city itself, including at least 10 protesters when security forces fired on a large crowd in the Baramkeh district of central Damascus.

SOHR reported the deaths of more than 130 civilians. 46 fell in the environs of Damascus and a further 12 in the city itself. Rockets were fired into Yarmouk Camp, killing a civilian. 17 civilians were slain in Homs and 15 in Idlib.

38 soldiers and 19 rebels were slain.

In Deiz ez Zor city it was claimed that Government forces used toxic gas to attack civilians. Nawaf Fares, who defected from his post as Syrian ambassador to Iraq, said in an interview with the BBC that he was "convinced" that Assad would draw on his stocks if cornered, and he and the FSA stated that gas attacks had been used already. A few days earlier, the Wall Street Journal said that intelligence reports suggested some chemical weapons were on the move, while a senior Syrian defector said that Assad's forces were moving chemical weapons across the country for possible use in a military retaliation for the killing of four top security officials.

=== 21 July ===
LCC reported 140 people were killed in Syria by the Syrian army including 18 defectors. 34 civilians were killed in Homs, and 28 in Damascus and the suburbs. Assad's forces were reported to have retaken control of Damascus.

The FSA began widescale fighting in Aleppo for the first time, capturing several neighborhoods.

SOHR reported the deaths of 164 people across Syria, including 86 civilians, 49 soldiers and 29 rebels.

=== 22 July ===
LCC reported the deaths of 111 civilians were killed by evening by the Syrian army, including 65 in Damascus and its suburbs. Alex Thomson, reporting from Midan suburb describes a 'familiar pattern of heavy shelling followed by militia going house to house looting and massacring'—an organised ground and air assault by Assad soldiers and Shabiha, followed by 'an orgy of looting'. Residents speak off-camera of a massacre. Anti-Assad graffiti is painted over in the suburb, but the Assad forces leave their own; 'The Soldiers of God were here.'

SOHR reported the deaths of 76 civilians; 18 in Damascus and a further 16 in the Damascus Countryside. 22 rebels were killed.

34 soldiers were slain.

The weekly death toll, according to SOHR, resulted in a body count of 209 rebels and 351 soldiers.

=== 23 July ===
175 civilians were killed by the end of the day, including 90 in Damascus and its suburbs alone. At least 35 soldiers and 17 rebels died.

=== 24 July ===
The Syrian ambassador to Cyprus, Lamia al-Hariri, defected to the opposition bringing the total number of ambassadors to defect publicly to 3. She is the niece of Syrian Vice President Farouk al-Sharaa. The former ambassador to Sweden, Bassam Imadi said that the envoys to Germany, the Czech Republic, and Belarus, had defected already, but have not announced it publicly due to fears over government reprisals.

About 150 civilians were killed, including 46 in Hama, of which over 30 died in a massacre in Latamna. 26 soldiers and 4 opposition fighters were killed.

Government MiG-23s bomb eastern areas of the commercial capital of Syria, Aleppo, the first solid claims of war planes being used by Assad. Sarah Leah Whitson, the director of the Middle East division of Human Rights Watch, said the use of fighter jets in populated areas was of great concern.

=== 25 July ===
Turkey closed all border gates with Syria due to worsening security conditions, though it would still let refugees cross.

Syria's ambassador to the UAE, Abdelatif al-Dabbagh defected to Qatar, where his wife, Lamia al-Hariri who defected earlier was also staying. A military attache to the Syrian embassy to Oman defected. Also two more Brigadier Generals defected, going to Turkey, bring the total number of defected generals to 27.

129 people were killed by evening. 27 were killed Damascus and its Suburbs, where most killed in a massacre in the Qaboun neighborhood, their bodies were discovered today. At least 41 soldiers and 32 opposition fighters died throughout the country.

Fighting continued much of the day in the southern suburb of Kadam, and young men report the Syrian Army setting people's houses on fire.

A long column of dozens of Assad's tanks, brought in from Idlib and Hama, approached Aleppo in an attempt to crush the opposition forces there.

=== 26 July ===
Ikhlas al-Badawi, Syrian legislator for the Aleppo Governorate, defected from the city of Aleppo and into Turkey, blaming the 'savage torture' of the Assad regime and becoming the first member of the rubber-stamp assembly dominated by the Ba'ath party to defect.

As the Free Syrian Army holds western and eastern neighborhoods of Aleppo, Assad's army bombards the western neighborhoods with mortars, and bombards the eastern neighborhood with Russian Mi-25 helicopter gunships.

Over 200 civilians were killed by the end of the day. 47 were killed in Aleppo, while 46 were killed Damascus and its Suburbs, where most killed in a massacre in the Yalda and Saynab neighborhoods.

=== 27 July ===
Over 100 civilians were killed, including 30 in Daraa.

The Syrian ambassador to Belarus and the Baltic states announced his defection to the opposition.

Protests occurred throughout Syria, as the Syrian army prepared to converge onto Aleppo, in a bid to try to retake the city from the Free Syrian Army.

=== 28 July ===
A Syrian TV presenter on state TV defected, citing crimes against civilians committed by the state.

Over 180 civilians were killed by the end of the day, primarily in Aleppo, Daara, and the Damascus suburbs.

Assad's forces bombarded FSA-held areas of Aleppo, and then sent in tanks supported by helicopter gunships. However, the FSA attacked the invading tanks with rocket-propelled grenades, causing the tanks to withdraw, so Assad's forces went back to bombarding FSA-held neighborhoods from afar.

=== 29 July ===
114 civilians were killed by the end of the day, including 41 in Damascus and its suburbs, of which 36 were killed in a massacre in Moadamiyeh.

The Syrian opposition ask allies for heavy arms to stop tanks and aeroplanes.

=== 30 July ===
Syrian rebels seize strategic checkpoint between Aleppo and Turkey after a 10-hour battle.

Deputy police chief in Syria's Latakia, a brigadier general, flees and defected to Turkey with 11 other Syrian officers.

Syria closes Australian embassy.

Syrian Chargé d'Affaires, Khaled al-Ayoubi, has informed the Britain's Foreign Office today that he has left his post in the Syrian embassy in London because he is "no longer willing to represent a regime that has committed such violent and oppressive acts against its own people".

At least 100 people were killed, including 30 in the Damascus suburbs and 25 in Aleppo.

=== 31 July ===
Syrian rebels overran two police stations in Aleppo city, killing at least 40 policemen. The defenders of the police stations and posts were Mukhabarat and Shabiha, both of whom have been accused of abuses including torture and rape and summary justice appears to have been meted out in some instances. Continued rebel resistance against armour and artillery in districts of Salheddine and Hamdaniyeh. A militia loyal to Assad carried out an assault near the city's airport which made the road viable for regime soldiers and supplies to be brought from Damascus.

Syrian rebels capture military base in Al-Bab, near to Aleppo, effectively freeing the city, after withdrawal of government forces.

97 civilians were killed, including 22 in Aleppo and 15 in Homs. while the Syrian consul in Armenia, Mohammad Hussam Hafez, defected to the opposition.

== August 2012 ==
A Syrian Army offensive in the Rif Dimashq Governorate begins during August 2012.

=== 1 August ===
A video surfaced on the Internet showing rebels leading four supposed Assad loyalists, including the alleged head of a local militia, into a schoolyard. They are put against a wall and subsequently summarily executed by the rebels. According to Human Rights Watch, this act potentially constitutes a war crime by the rebels. In Damascus Assad's troops faced allegations of the execution of at least 35 men.

Reuters reported that intensive battles were still going on in Salheddine and that neither the rebels or the government were in control. According to an NBC News report, the rebels acquired nearly two dozen surface-to-air missiles, which were delivered to them via neighbouring Turkey. However, a rebel FSA spokesman denied the report. CNN reported that rebels were using a school as a prison, housing captured pro-government militia members. United Nations observers in the area saw Syrian Air Force jets bombing rebel held districts on 1 August.

As the government pulled in regular Syrian troops from peripheral areas for the military assault on Aleppo, there was clear evidence that others are almost seamlessly moving into the vacuum left behind. And in some Kurdish parts of northern Syria the opposition forces of the Democratic Union Party (PYD) and other smaller factions have all but taken over. The leader of the PYD, Salih Muslim, spoke to the BBC in recent days about his movement's strategy and aspirations. "We are able to govern ourselves - we have the power for it," he said. Mr Muslim was careful to insist, at this stage at least, that he wasn't calling for an independent Kurdistan but an autonomous region within a new, democratic Syria. It is thought that Kurdish militias now control at least four main towns and cities in northern Syria. They reportedly include at least parts of Qamishlo, Efrin, Amude, Terbaspi and Ayn El Arab. More remarkable is that although there were sporadic clashes and some loss of life many of them appear to have been secured without much of a fight.

By the end of the day, LCC reported the deaths of over 170 civilians, primarily in Damascus' suburbs, where two massacres perpetrated by Shabiha and the fourth division occurred in Artouz and Yalda.

SOHR reported the deaths of 115 civilians; 52 in the Damascus Suburbs and 15 in Idlib. Fighting in Aleppo witnessed the deaths of 12 civilians. Three rebels were killed in Aleppo; including a defected major and a rebel leader. 18 other rebels were killed throughout Syria.

45 Syrian soldiers were killed.

=== 2 August ===
Kofi Annan says he is quitting as special envoy to Syria.

Al Jazeera reports armed clashes between the Jordanian and Syrian armies early Thursday morning in the Deraa province of Syria, near the Jordanian city of Ramtha.

SOHR reported the deaths of more than 113 civilians. In addition, around 50 civilians were killed in the al-Arba'een neighbourhood of Hama; but difficulties in contacting the area proved too difficult for SOHR to register the exact number of deaths. 29 were killed in Damascus and a further 12 killed in the Damascus Countryside. 21 civilians were killed and 65 wounded in the mortar shelling of Yarmouk Camp. Residents blamed the government. Witnesses in the camp told Reuters by telephone that the mortars hit a busy street as people were preparing a Ramadan meal to end their fast. 26 were killed in Dera'a; of which 13 were killed in the bombardment of Busra al-Harir.

By the end of the day, LCC reported the deaths of over 130 civilians.

28 rebels were killed, in addition to some rebels killed in the al-Arba'een neighbourhood of Hama. 8 were killed in Idlib.

43 soldiers were killed.

=== 3 August ===
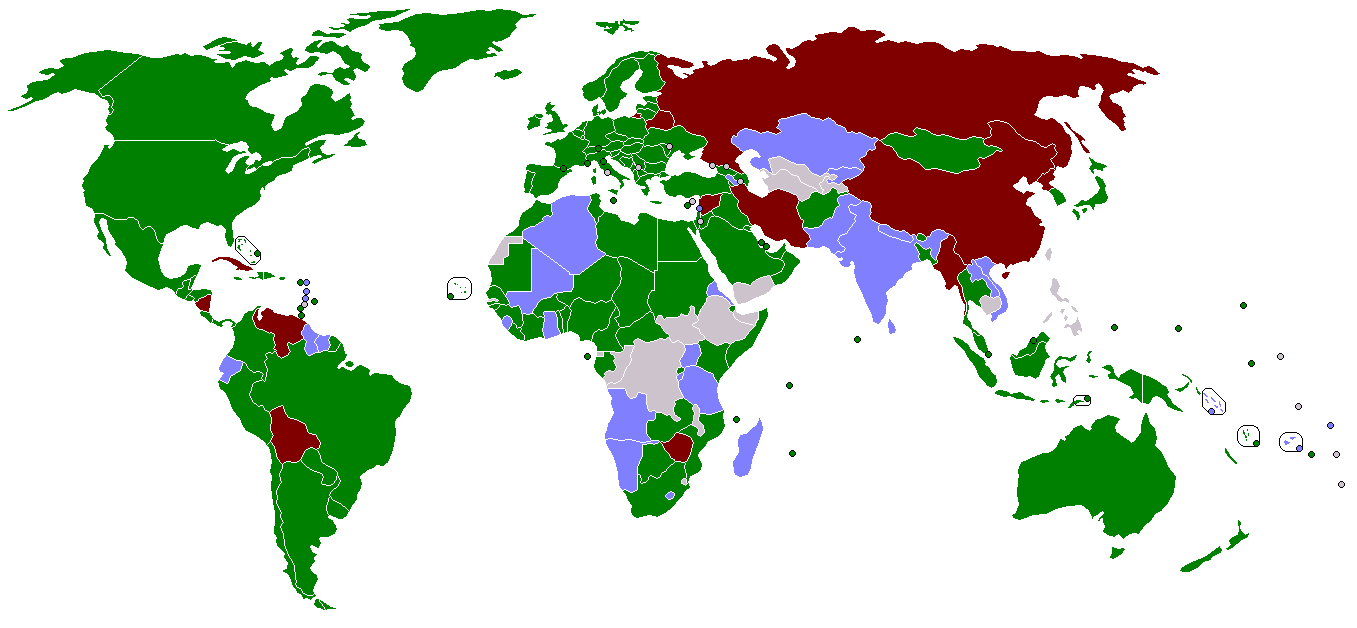
UNGA Resolution A/RES/66/253 B (see also A/RES/66/253 A) for against abstain

Shelling of Syria refugee camp kills 15 civilians.

A massacre occurred in Hama where 62 people were killed. Fighting continues in Aleppo and Damascus. Assad troops storm southern Damascus district of Tadamon backed by dozens of tanks and artillery according to a witness and activists. The UN General Assembly meets to vote on a resolution that denounces Assad for the use of tanks, artillery, helicopters and warplanes on the people of Aleppo and Damascus and demands the Syrian authorities fulfil immediately their commitment to cease the use of heavy weapons and complete the withdrawal of their troops and heavy weapons to their barracks. UN peacekeeping chief Herve Ladsous reports the UN observers in Aleppo are witnessing a considerable build-up of military means.

Syrian brigadier-general Ahmed Talas, who is the head of the arms contracts department in interior ministry, has defected along with the major-general Mohamed Alhaj, the director of defense college in the Military Academy.

19 rebels were slain; 6 in Idlib. A defected captain was killed during clashes in Hama; he was the Military commander of the Abu Abdullah Usman bin Affan battalion in Hama.

19 soldiers were killed.

By evening 137 civilians were killed, including 73 in Hama, most of whom died in a massacre in the Arbaeen neighborhood.

=== 4 August ===
By evening the LCC reported that 145 civilians were killed, including 53 in the Damascus suburbs.

=== 5 August ===
By the end of the day the LCC reported that 125 civilians were killed, including 59 in the Damascus suburbs. Colonel Yaraab Shara, head of the information division at the Political Security in Damascus defected and crossed the border to Jordan. The first Syrian in space, General Muhammed Faris, defected to the opposition and talked to rebels in Aleppo before crossing the border to Turkey.

=== 6 August ===
Syrian Prime Minister Riyad Farid Hijab defected to Jordan with his family. The Saudi broadcaster, al-Arabiya, claimed that three other ministers also defected with the prime minister. Syria TV also stated that Omar Ibrahim Ghalawanji, who had been a deputy prime minister, was appointed to lead temporary caretaker government. The two other ministry defectors are Hijab's brothers, who were working in the oil and environment department. The defections were apparently planned before his appointment as first minister. The PM's spokesman confirmed he was safe in Jordan and had defected. Hijab said "I announce today my defection from the killing and terrorist regime and I announce that I have joined the ranks of the freedom and dignity revolution. I announce that I am from today a soldier in this blessed revolution," and urged more officials to defect.

A 31st brigadier general defected and fled to Turkey.

An opposition sources said that 40 were killed in massacre in central Syria.

By the end of the day the LCC said that over 164 civilians were killed by artillery shelling by the Syrian army, including 54 in Aleppo, and 33 in the Damascus suburbs.

=== 7 August ===
More than 1300 Syrians, including a brigadier-general and 11 military officers, fled to Turkey overnight.

United Nations pulls all monitors out of Aleppo because of security concerns.

A survivor of a killing by pro-government militia said that 10 prisoners were executed in Aleppo. He was found injured and taken to be treated in a rebel-held town.

170 civilians were killed by the end of the day, including 35 in Homs and 33 in the Damascus suburbs. Total number of people killed in the civil war during Tuesday was 257.

Three of 48 Iranian hostages, reported to be members of Iran's Revolutionary Guard Corps, held by Syrian rebels, were reported to be killed by Syrian Army artillery fire. Iran said it would hold the United States responsible for the fate of the Iranian hostages.

=== 8 August ===
Syrian rebel group claims it has killed a Russian general Vladimir Petrovich Kuzheyev along with his private translator, Ahmed Aiq, working as an adviser to Syria's ministry of defense near Damascus. This was, however, denied by Vladimir Petrovich Kuzheyev himself when he appeared during a Russian news channel, saying he is a retired general currently living in Moscow and that the report of his death "was an exaggeration".

Syrian rebels ring Aleppo enclave with roadside bombs.

By the evening the lCC reported 167 civilians killed, including 30 in the Damascus suburbs, 30 in Aleppo, and 22 in Hama.

=== 9 August ===
The LCC reported that 142 civilians were killed by evening, including 40 in the Damascus suburbs and 33 in Aleppo. In Aleppo, after a pounding from air and ground by regime forces, and rising civilian casualties in the last few days, rebel fighters left Salaheddine. Medics and doctors remain though they can face severe punitive action;"three young doctors arrested were found dead, another was killed by a sniper on Salaheddine Square yesterday despite wearing a white coat."

=== 10 August ===
The LCC reported that 180 civilians were killed by the end of the day, including 75 in Aleppo city.

Friday protests erupted across Syria, particularly in Aleppo and Damascus city and suburbs, as well as Homs, Hama, idlib, and the Daara province.

=== 11 August ===
Syrian and Jordanian forces clashed in border area after Syrian soldiers fired on refugees leaving the country, with Jordan responding. Armoured vehicles were involved in the clash and fired on two Syrian border posts, with intense fighting for an hour. An official Jordanian source said "The Syrian side fired across the border and fighting ensued. Initial reports indicate that there has been no one killed from the Jordanian side."

Rebels got their first Anti-aircraft Stingers.

Two journalists were killed in Damascus. SANA's Ali Abbas, was killed at home in Damascus and Al Arabiya's Bara'a Yusuf al-Bushi, a Syrian national and army defector was killed in bomb attack in Damascus.

By the end of the day the LCC reported 101 civilians killed, including 29 in the Damascus suburbs.

=== 12 August ===
The deputy police commander for the central Syria, Brigadier General Ibrahim al-Jabawi defects to Jordan.

By evening 110 civilians were killed, including 45 in the Damascus suburbs, and 26 in Homs. Most of these "civilians" were rebels killed in Kesleh.

=== 13 August ===
The head of the United Nations monitors, General Babacar Gaye said that violence was increasing across Syria.

New massacre reported in suburban Damascus, where a dozen people were summarily executed by the Syrian army in Artouz, Damascus.

A video of showing the crash of what has been tentatively identified as a MiG-23 aircraft flying over Muhasan was released to the Internet, in which rebels claimed to have shot it down.

Syrian opposition officials claimed the CIA is controlling weapons flow to Syrian insurgents.

By evening, 111 civilians were killed, including 64 in the Damascus suburbs.

=== 14 August ===
Former Syrian Prime Minister Riad Hijab said Assad controls only 30% of Syria.

According to the Saudi Al Watan newspaper, the Russian Deputy Minister of Foreign Affairs, Mikhail Bogdanov said that Bashar al-Assad is ready to give up his powers. Syria's state media informed opposite. The Russian Foreign Ministry Bogdanov denied also Saudi Arabian newspaper report.

By the end of the day, over 100 civilians were killed, including 23 in the Damascus suburbs and 20 in Daraa.

=== 15 August ===
To defend its credibility, al-Watan on early Wednesday published alleged Bogdanov interview in a MP3format on its website But AFP reported that the voice did not match Bogdanov.

Syrian air force air strike hits hospital in Aleppo wounding one person. Human Rights Watch called it was an attack in violation of international law.

Bomb explodes behind Damascus hotel housing U.N. monitors left 3 wounded. Head of FSA brigade that planned Damascus bombings said they targeted the central security command not UN.

The UN concludes that the massacre in Houla was a war crime authorized by President Assad. A regime air raid killed 30 people in the rebel-held northern border town of Azaz. The Assad regime still holds the town's military airport.

U.S. officials confirm captured Iranians in Syria are active military. Pentagon, U.S. Defense Secretary Leon Panetta said Iran is building, training militia in Syria.

A Shia Lebanese tribe abducted a group of 20 people, mainly Free Syrian Army rebels, including a Saudi and a Turk, in retaliation for the kidnapping of one of its members by the FSA. The armed branch of the clan threatened more action if their member was not released.

By the end of the day the LCC reported 205 civilians killed, primarily in the Syrian army's bombardment of Azaz, where over 80 people were killed.

=== 16 August ===
Assad appoints three new ministers.

At least were 60 killed in a massacre in Damascus.

By evening the LCC reported 179 civilian killed, the number including over 60 bodies found summarily executed in the town of Qatana, Damascus suburbs.

By the end of the day the LCC reported 238 killed, including 123 in the Damascus suburbs, including the 60 bodies found in Qatana.

=== 17 August ===
Lakhdar Brahimi, a veteran Algerian diplomat, will take over from Kofi Annan as the international envoy the United Nations said Friday.

The Syrian Army freed state television journalists who had been abducted in al Tal by the rebels, after rebels under intense military bombardment retreated from the mountain town.

Large protests against the government came out after prayers, primarily focused in Aleppo, Damascus, and the Hama, Idlib, Daara and Homs provinces.

France stated that several "spectacular" defections were in the process of occurring.

By noon 72 people had been killed, the SOHR reported.

According to the LCC, by the end of the day 168 civilians were killed.

=== 18 August ===
Airstrike killed 8 and wounded at least 20 in Syria town near Turkey border.

The LCC reported that by evening 148 civilians were killed. 57 were killed in the Damascus suburbs, including over 40 bodies found in Al Tal.

Syrian rebels foil army attempt to take the Bab al-Hawa border gateway leading to Turkey.

=== 19 August ===
According to the LCC, By the end of the day 170 civilians were killed by the Syria army, including 51 in Daraa.

=== 20 August ===
United Nations observer mission in Syria ended.

The LCC reported that 150 civilians were killed by the evening, including 54 in the Damascus suburbs. Japanese free-lance journalist Mika Yamamoto was killed by gunfire while covering the civil war in Aleppo.

=== 21 August ===
According to the LCC, over 230 civilians were killed by the end of the day including 104 in the Damascus suburbs, primarily in a massacre in Moadamiya.

=== 22 August ===
The LCC reported that over 184 civilians were killed by evening, including over 100 in Damascus and its suburbs, primarily in field executions in Kafar Souseh and Qaboun.

=== 23 August ===
The LCC reported over 200 civilians killed by the end of the day, including 96 in Damascus and its suburbs.

Several residents reported that the Syrian Army took control of the Christian quarters of Aleppo. The Army also faced little resistance when they advanced into Darya, Damascus countryside, where the rebels fled. Rebels waged fierce battles with regime troops in the town of Abu Kamal along the Iraqi border (Coordinates: 34°27′55.17″N 40°54′29.46″E), capturing a string of security posts and the local police headquarters despite heavy government shelling and airstrikes by warplanes, activists said. Fierce clashes had been reported.

=== 24 August ===
The LCC reported that by the end of the day 206 civilians were killed, including 55 in the Damascus suburbs and 45 in Mayadin, Deir Ezzor, when a building collapsed from artillery shelling. Intensity of the regime assault rose. In Midan, Damascus suburb, a resident told the British Guardian newspaper: "Everyone is being arrested, or killed. There was a time when the regime made a distinction between residents and gunmen. Now they treat everyone as one and the same."

=== 25 August ===
The LCC reported that 440 civilians were killed by the end of the day. Assad troops who stormed the poor Sunni community of Darayya on the south-west outskirts of Damascus are accused of massacring over 200 people. The claimed death toll could not be independently verified.

=== 26 August ===
Another massacre was perpetrated in the suburb of Darayya. Reports of the death toll ranged from more than 300 to as many as 600. U.N. Chief Ban Ki-moon calls for immediate independent investigation.

The LCC reported 244 civilians killed by evening, including 85 in the Damascus suburbs, and 76 killed in a massacre in Bushra al Sham.

Rebels claimed to have shot down a government attack helicopter, type unknown although possibly a Mil-24.

=== 27 August ===
231 civilians were killed by the end of the day, including 148 in Damascus and its suburbs.

=== 28 August ===
By the end of the day the LCC reported 140 civilians killed, including 54 in the Damascus suburbs.

=== 29 August ===
Rebels claim to have attacked a "military air base in the northern town of Taftanaz" damaging several Government helicopters. Their claims could not be independently verified.

Rebels also claimed, via a video posted on line, to have uncovered a stash of gas masks ready for immediate use if the Government uses chemical weapons.

The LCC reported that 136 civilians were killed by the end of the day, including 66 in the Damascus suburbs.

=== 30 August ===
By the end of the day the lcc reported that 164 civilians were killed, including 72 from Idlib.

In Aleppo Government airstrikes are alleged to have struck at least 10 bakeries as people lined up to collect bread, killing dozens.

=== 31 August ===
A rebel unit of army defectors launched a major offensive against security facilities in Syria's largest city of Aleppo, and anti-regime forces targeted air bases to try to reduce the military threat from the skies, activists said. LCC said rebels shot down a helicopter in the town of Sarmin (Coordinates: 35°54′13.06″N 36°43′32.44″E), in the northeastern province of Idlib. An activist in the area also reported a helicopter was downed. Fighting continued elsewhere in Syria on that day, including Damascus, where intense battles have been raging for more than a month. The Observatory and the Local Coordination Committees also reported clashes and shelling between troops and rebels in the southern province of Daraa and the central region of Homs. By late of the day, the observatory said as many as 100 people were killed across Syria.

By the end of the day the LCC reported 112 people killed, including 38 in the Damascus suburbs.
