= Tlass =

Tlass is a surname. Notable people with the surname include:

- Firas Tlass (born 1960), Syrian businessman
- Manaf Tlass (born 1964), Syrian brigadier general
- Mustafa Tlass (1932–2017), Syrian military officer and politician
