= Ayoubi =

Ayoubi is a surname. Notable people with the name include:

- Abdul Latif Ayoubi (born 1980), Afghan cricketer
- Abdul Rahim Ayoubi (born 1982), politician in Afghanistan
- Aida el Ayoubi (born 1964), Egyptian singer, songwriter, and guitarist
- Aula Al Ayoubi (born 1973), Syrian painter and visual artist
- Austin Ayoubi (born 2001), Lebanese footballer
- Khaled al-Ayoubi, former Syrian diplomat
- Majid Ayoubi (born 1980), Iranian football coach and a former defender
- Najla Ayoubi, Afghan women's rights defender, lawyer, and former judge
- Nour El-Ayoubi (born 1997), Egyptian synchronised swimmer
- Salar Ayoubi, Iranian oud player

== See also ==
- Ayoubi Cricket Stadium, cricket ground in Kabul, Afghanistan
- Al-Ayoubi family, prominent family based in Damascus, Syria
