= Awak =

Awak may refer to:

- Awak language
- Awak Kuier
- Hussam Awak
- Pisang Awak banana
- AWAK
