= Mohammed Ezz al-Din Khalouf =

- Military career
- Allegiance: Ba'athist Syria (previously) Syrian National Council (present)
- Branch: (Syria) Free Syrian Army
- Rank: Major General
- Commands: Head of logistics and supply for the Syrian Army
- Conflicts: Syrian civil war

Mohammed Ezz al-Din Khalouf (Arabic: محمد عز الدين خلوف) is a Free Syrian Army major general who defected from the Army to the FSA in March 2013. After his defection, he fled with his wife and three children (including Army captain Ezz al-Din Khalouf) from Damascus to Jordan with the help of the opposition.
