= Salar Ayoubi =

Iranian oud player (born 1978)

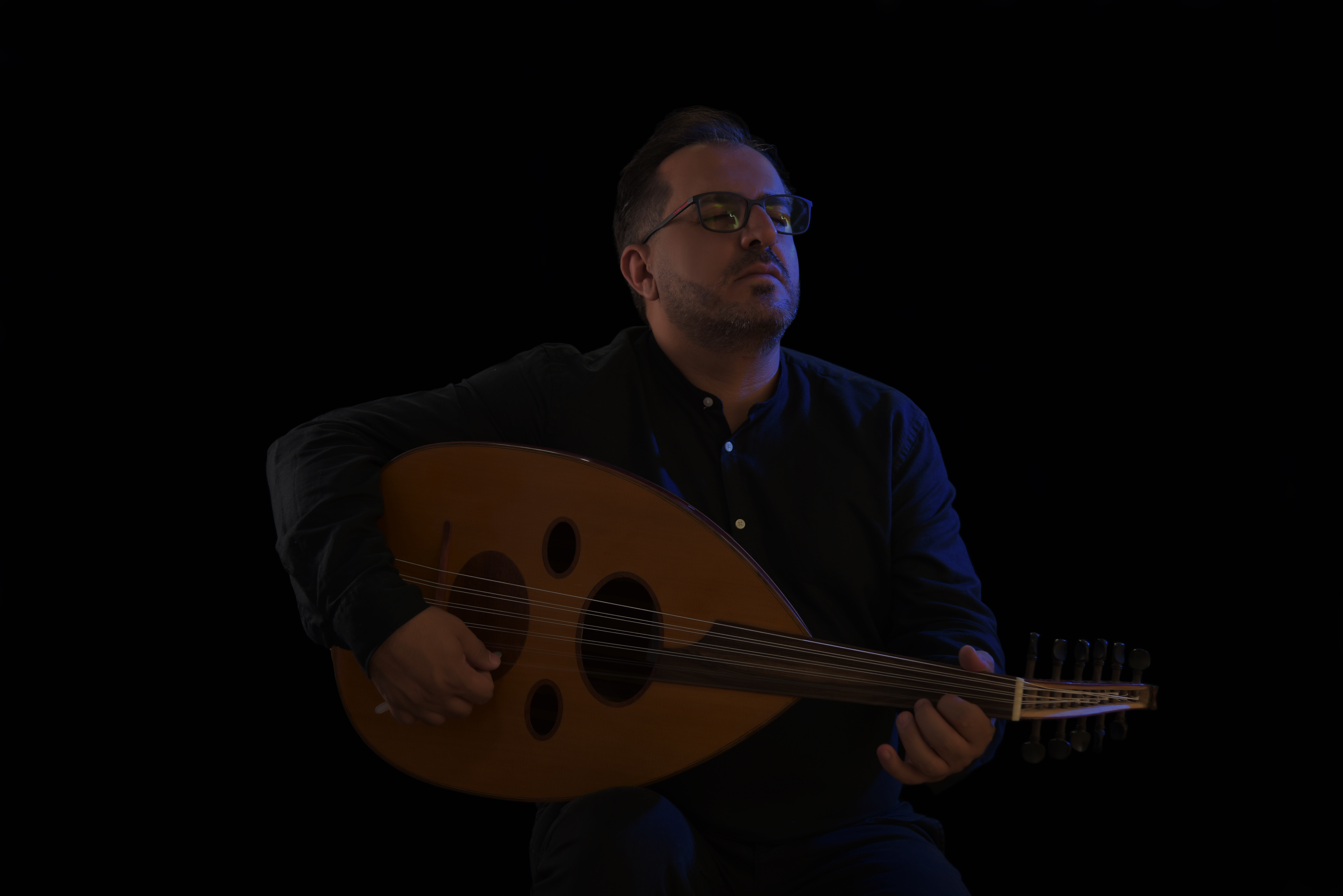
Salar Ayoubi

Salar Ayoubi is an Iranian oud player who has worked with many National and International bands across the world.

Salar Ayoubi was born on 26 June 1978 in Kurdistan (Iran). He studied music with different music teachers since he was 9 years old. Salar Studied Music at the Tehran Music Conservatory.

He was invited to perform in Australia in 1999 and conducted an Australian Tour with Rona Ensemble. Again in 2001 he was invited to perform at the National Folk Festival to perform variety of Persia and Kurdish Songs. the band also performed for 3 days the National Multicultural Festival.

Salar Ayoubi shaped the Sarv Ensemble's Australia and the band did its first public performance in July 2013 at the Australian National University followed by a tour around Australia in August 2013 and February 2014.

Salar migrated to Australia permanently in 2001 and performed in many Festivals, events and concert halls across the country. He conducted many workshops with other Musicians to teach young kids, and students. Salar conducted many workshops at the School of Music (Australian National University) over the past years and participated in many public lectures about middle eastern music.

Sarv invited Maestro Majid Derakhshani from Iran in 2014 to perform in Australia under the name of Mah Ensemble with the voice of Mahdieh Mohammadkhani.

Sarv and Salar Ayoubi performed at the opening ceremony of 2017 National Multicultural Festival along with the Chinese Orchestra from China.

Serv Ensemble Australia is conducted another tour in August 2017 is six cities around Australia with Ostad Majid Derakhshani, Maliheh Moradi, Shahu Andalibi, Vahideh Esaie, Mehrdad Nasehi and Nazanin Ranjpour.

Save led by Salar Ayoubi performed at the Nexus Arts in Adelaide in January 2018. Ayoubi's latest composition “Hawar” was broadcast on many Kurdish and Iranian TV channels and was well received by the Kurdish Community across Iran, Iraq, Turkey and Syria. He also released a New song called (Maheh Allam Sooz) in late 2019.

His recent compositions are Sabri, Tasa, Chnoor mainly focused on Kurdish Music, He also arranged Shabeh Mahtab in 2022.

== Teachers ==
Reza Rezaee

Mehran Lotfi

Kaivan Saket

Mansour Nariman

Mohammad Firoozi

Mohsen Elhamian

== Albums ==
Avayeh Tanhaee

Oud & Kamancheh

“Zamawan” be released in 2020

Salar worked with Mah Ensemble, Azar Kimya, Roodaki, Darvag, Sarv Ensemble Australia and many more over the past years.

Salar has lived in Australia since 2001 and has actively worked and participated in many Music Festivals around Australia.

== Sources ==
http://citynews.com.au/tag/salar-ayoubi/

https://www.canberratimes.com.au/act-news/national-multicultural-festival-opens-for-2017-opens-with-performance-at-llewellyn-hall-20170216-guem85.html

https://www.eventfinda.com.au/2014/mah-moon-ensemble-tour-in-australia-canberra/canberra/acton
