= Lamia al-Hariri =

Former Syrian diplomat

Lamia al Hariri
- Born: Lamia al Hariri; Hama
- Occupation: Diplomat
- Parent: Mohammad Al Hariri (father)
- Relatives: Farouk Al Shaara (uncle)

Lamia al Hariri (Arabic: لمياء الحريري) is Syria's former chargée d'affaires in the Republic of Cyprus who defected to Qatar in July 2012.

== Early life ==
Hariri was born in Hama but originally from the Daraa Governorate. She is the daughter of the retired major general Mohammad Al Hariri, a former deputy interior minister. She is also the niece of Syrian vice-President Farouk al Shaara.

== Career and defection ==
Hariri was appointed to Nicosia as Syrian chargée d'affaires in November 2010. Her defection was reported by Al Jazeera on 24 July 2012. Two members of the opposition Syrian National Council (SNC) confirmed her defection on 25 July 2012. Al Arabiya reported that she joined the opposition. She reportedly went to Qatar and she is still there. On 25 July 2012, her husband Abdelatif al-Dabbagh, former Syrian ambassador to the United Arab Emirates, also defected to Qatar and joined his wife, Lamia al Hariri. His defection was also confirmed by SNC spokesman Mohammad Sarmini.

On 26 July 2012, SANA issued a statement of Syria Foreign Ministry, stating that Lamia al Hariri was not an ambassador, but a diplomat working at the Syrian Embassy in Cyprus and that her mission was to manage the Embassy's affairs until an ambassador or charge d'affaires is appointed.

Her defection was significant, since it was the second defection of a Syrian diplomat in July 2012 after that of Nawaf al Fares.
