= Mohib Omar al-Jadaan =

- Born: Kafr Nabl, Syria
- Died: 5 January 2015; Atme, Syria
- Military career
- Allegiance: Ba'athist Syria (previously) Syrian National Council (present)
- Branch: Free Syrian Army
- Rank: Colonel
- Nickname: Mohib Hamdo
- Unit: Brigade 101
- Conflicts: Syrian civil war

Mohib Omar al-Jadaan was a Free Syrian Army colonel, who defected from the Syrian Army to the FSA. He was one of the first pilots to defect during the Syrian Civil War, after he refused to bomb targets in Atama. After his defection, al-Jadaan joined the rebel brigade 101 (part of the 7th Brigade). He was detained by Islamic State group for a short time.

Mohib Omar al-Jadaan was killed by an explosive device in Atme on 5 January 2015, near the Turkish border.
