= Hussam Awak =

Syrian former commander

Hussam al-Din Awak
- حسام العواك
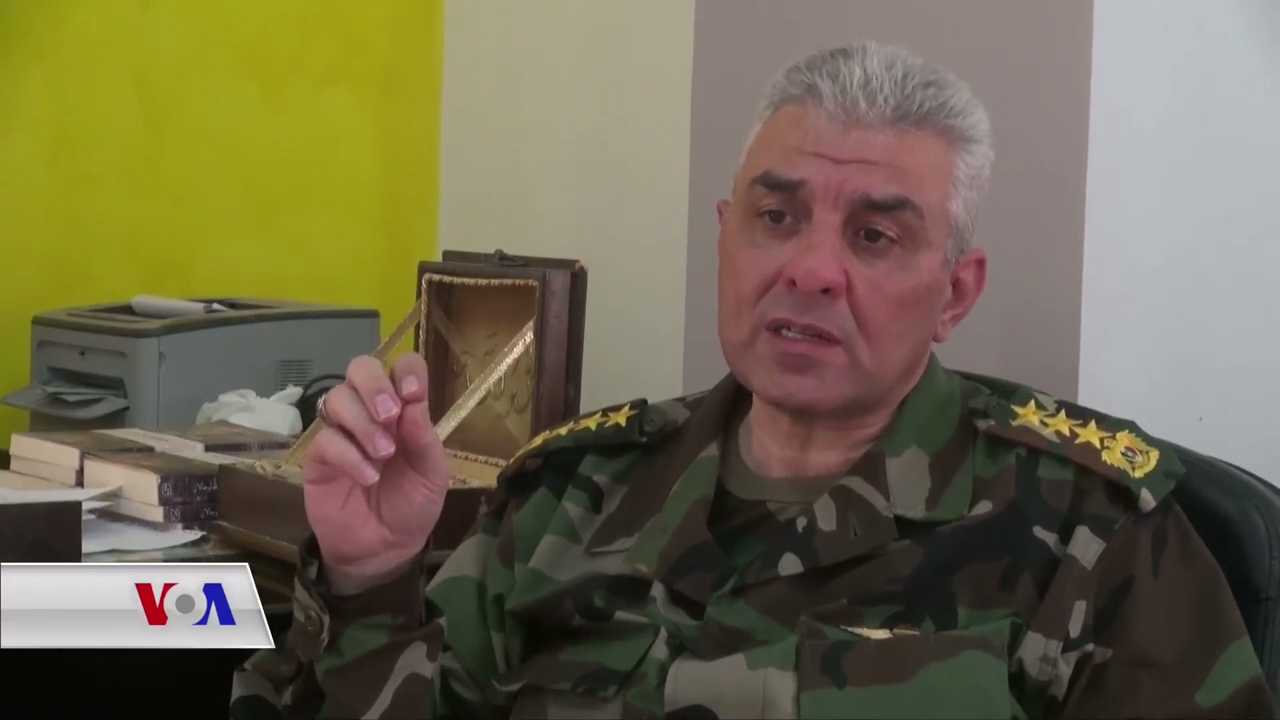
- Hussam Awak in late 2016
- Born: Deir ez-Zor Governorate, Syria
- Military career
- Allegiance: Ba'athist Syria (?–2004) (Syrian opposition) Free Syrian Army (disputed, 2012–16); Rojava (2016–?)
- Branch: Syrian Arab Air Force and Air Force Intelligence Directorate (before 2005); (Syrian opposition) Free Officers Union (2012–2016); Syrian Democratic Forces (2016–2017)
- Service years: ?–2004, 2011–2017
- Rank: Brigadier general
- Conflicts: Syrian Civil War; 2012–13 escalation; Inter-rebel conflict; Raqqa campaign (2016–2017); Battle of Tabqa (2017); Battle of Raqqa (2017)

Hussam al-Din Awak is a former officer in the Syrian Armed Forces who reportedly became a Free Syrian Army commander upon the outbreak of the Syrian civil war. After claiming in 2015 that Turkey had cooperated with Islamic State (IS), Awak was denounced by Syrian opposition figures as a fraud and liar. In 2016, Awak joined the Syrian Democratic Forces (SDF) alongside his unit, the Free Officers Union. He eventually resigned from the SDF and the Syrian Democratic Council in December 2017.

== Biography ==
=== Service in the Syrian Armed Forces ===
Hussam Awak is from Deir ez-Zor Governorate and served in the Syrian Arab Air Force and Air Force Intelligence Directorate before 2005. His rank at that time, however, is strongly disputed; he has widely been described as a former brigadier general by various news agencies, but his opponents have claimed that Hussam has given this rank to himself, and that he had never risen to a particularly high position in the Syrian Armed Forces. According to Dam Press, he was major by 2004. The circumstances of his resignation from the Syrian military are equally controversial. Hussam has been considered a defector by some, whereas others allege that he was fired "for indecent behaviour" in 2005, and later presented himself as an opposition figure out of opportunism. His opponents claim that he was linked to prostitution, smuggling and corruption during his time in the military. After leaving the military, Awak moved from Syria to the United Arab Emirates, where he found new work.

=== Syrian Civil War ===
==== Free Officers Union ====
Hussam surfaced as a Syrian opposition member in December 2011, claiming to serve as a commander in the Free Officers Union, which in turn had by then become a Free Syrian Army member. In his position as the Free Officers Union's head of intelligence, he operated in Syria, the Gulf states and Egypt in an attempt to gain international support for his group and their aims. He reportedly attempted to become the leader of the military exiles among the Syrian opposition, but this was thwarted by Riad al-Asaad. Hussam gave numerous interviews in 2012, in which he was also critical of US support to some rebel militias in Syria, saying that "the American intelligence — the CIA — should be more selective in choosing opposition figures, and (should not) choose just anyone. They should choose reliable persons." He also accused the Syrian Intelligence agencies and the Lebanese Tawhid Party of being responsible for the abduction of Shibli al-Aysami. When 13 Lebanese pilgrims were abducted by rebels in May 2012, Awak claimed to have contacted the leader of the kidnappers and to try to get the pilgrims released. Hussam also condemned the abduction of 21 Filipino UN soldiers in early March 2013 by the Yarmouk Martyrs Brigade.

In late 2015, Hussam said in an interview with the Sputnik news agency that he had evidence that Turkey bought oil from the Islamic State of Iraq and the Levant (ISIL). Thereafter, numerous pro-opposition sources and rebel leaders claimed that Awak was a fraud who supported Russia and was not connected to the Free Syrian Army in any way.

==== Syrian Democratic Forces ====
One year later, Hussam announced that he had defected from the FSA to the Syrian Democratic Forces, along with the Free Officers Union which reportedly had over one hundred members at the time. He said that the reason for his defection was that the FSA had reduced itself to the proxy of foreign powers, particularly Turkey. Furthermore, he blamed the FSA for terrorist actions against civilians. From then on, he served as SDF brigadier general, and praised the "YPG and YPJ [as] the sun that shone on the region with their outgoing mentality and their good behavior", while also saying that he supports the federalization of Syria.

The first SDF operation in which Hussam became involved was the campaign to capture Raqqa from ISIL. In May 2017, he led the negotiations with Jabhat Thuwar al-Raqqa to get them to join the Raqqa campaign. After promising the unit's leadership "that its role [in post-conquest Raqqa] will be essential", the group agreed to return to the frontlines. Hussam also attended a meeting in Mansura between local tribal sheikhs and representatives of the Raqqa Civil Council as well as the Syrian Democratic Council in August, during which he said that the Assad government "had no place" in Raqqa anymore.

==== Split with the SDF ====
Hussam announced his resignation from the SDF and Syrian Democratic Council on his Facebook page on 20 December 2017 without providing any reasons. He later stated that the resignation stemmed from various disagreements with the rest of the SDF leadership about issues such as the Turkish military operation in Afrin, taxes, prosecution of corrupt individuals, and cooperation with Russia and the United States. In early March 2018, Hussam and his wife disappeared in Jazira Region while visiting a person close to Humaydi Daham al-Hadi, leader of the Syrian Shammar. His family consequently accused the Shammar Sheikh of having enforcedly disappeared the former officer near al-Yaarubiyah, with his nephew asking Îlham Ehmed, co-chairperson of the Syrian Democratic Council, for help. It was later revealed, however, that he and his wife had been arrested by YPG intelligence agents who also confiscated their possessions. According to Hussam, the arrest had been organized due to his resignation from the SDF, while a pro-Syrian opposition news site alleged that he had tried to flee to Iraqi Kurdistan. He later claimed that PKK members intervened on his behalf, though they did not return the confiscated money and goods as promised. He was then put under house arrest, though freed thanks to the help of foreign supporters, including Kurdish friends and United Nations officials. After being freed, he further distanced himself from the YPG. In an interview he gave in August 2018, Hussam declared that he soon expected a popular uprising against the YPG due to the latter repressing all local opposition.

== Personal life ==
Hussam is married to a Libyan woman who was reportedly a former member of Muammar Gaddafi's Amazonian Guard according to a pro-Syrian opposition news site. His opponents claim that he has four other wives as well, but that they are separated from him.

== See also ==
- List of Syrian defectors
