= Mohammad Bassam Imadi =

Former ambassador of Syria to Sweden

- Born: 1950 (age 75–76); Damascus, Syria

Mohammad Bassam Imadi (born 1950) is the former Syrian ambassador to Sweden who defected from the Bashar al-Assad government in 2011 and became a member of the opposition Syrian National Council.

== Career ==
Imadi served as the Syrian ambassador to Sweden between 2004 and 2008. He began working with the opposition at the start of the uprising in March 2011.

== Defection ==
Imadi fled to Turkey with his family in December 2011. From Turkey, he worked with military leaders of the Syrian occupation who opposed the Assad government. He served as a member of the foreign relations committee of the Syrian National Council.
