= Firas Tlass =

Syrian businessperson (born 1960)

- فِرَاس طَلَاس
- Born: Firas Mustafa Tlass; 20 August 1960 (age 65); Damascus, Syria
- Occupation: Businessman
- Years active: 1980s – present
- Spouses: Rania Al-Jabiri (m. 1984; div. 2012); Lubna Alsoufi
- Children: 5
- Parent: Mustafa Tlass (father)
- Relatives: Manaf Tlass (brother)

Firas Tlass (Arabic: فِرَاس طَلَاس, romanized: Firās Ṭalās; born 20 August 1960) is a Syrian businessman and a member of a Sunni family close to former Syrian President Hafez al-Assad who defected to the rebels during the Syrian Civil War.

== Early life and education ==
Firas Tlass was born in Damascus on 20 August 1960. He is the second eldest child of Mustafa Tlass, a former Syrian Minister of Defense from 1972 to 2004 of Circassian and Turkish origin. Next to the Assad clan, his family was the most famous Sunni family in Syria, known for supporting the government. On the other hand, the members of his family worked for the Ottoman suzerains as well as French occupiers after the First World War. Manaf Tlass, who was a senior military official and defected in July 2012, is his younger brother.

He attended Ecole Laique in Damascus, graduating in 1978. He studied business administration at Damascus University, graduating with a bachelor of arts degree in economy in 1984. He went to France to study French and obtained a degree in commerce from Paris.

== Business career ==
Tlass is described as a business tycoon and Syria's sugar king. He was one of the richest men in Syria. Tlass was a significant supporter and beneficiary of Bashar al-Assad's liberal economy policies.

Tlass founded Min Ajl Suriyya (MAS) (“For Syria” in English) in 1984. MAS engages in commercial ventures ranging from roasting coffee beans to producing metal, canned food, and dairy products. In 2004, Tlass also began to provide financial assistance to the website Syria News that was owned by the Syrian Economic Center (SEC). In 2010, he launched EFG Hermes Syria with EFG Hermes, the leading Egyptian investment bank in the Arab world. It was reported that EFG Hermes Syria was a partnership between EFG Hermes (70%) and Firas Tlass (30%). Tlass became the chairman of the firm. Additionally, Tlass was the local joint venture partner for French cement company Lafarge. He is also Chairman of Palmyra-SODIC. His other business activity is the Palmyra real estate development company, of which he is the general manager.

Tlass is a former member of the Ba'ath Party. However, in 2005, he and another Baath member, Abdel Nour, argued that they supported multi-party elections and ending the Baath monopoly on power in Syria. Firas Tlass also said that the relations with the US should be better. In 2012, the New York Times reported that Firas and his brother, Brigadier General Manaf Tlass had defected. They were regarded by Bashar al-Assad as peers and friends.

=== Controversy ===
From 2012 to 2014, Lafarge's factory in Jalabiya, northern Syria, continued operating throughout the war. Factory chief Bruno Pescheux said Lafarge paid up to $100,000 a month to Tlass, a minority shareholder who allegedly paid armed factions to keep the factory open. In April 2026, he was sentenced in absentia by a French tribunal to seven years in prison, 225,000 euros and banned from entering France for his role in the Lafarge scandal.

== Defection and views ==
AFP reported that Firas and his father, former defense minister Mustafa Tlass, arrived in Paris in March 2012. Reuters characterized the move as defection, reporting that Mustafa Tlass left for France claiming to need medical care and Firas left for Egypt. Reports place him Firas in Dubai, in France with his father, and indicate travels between the United Arab Emirates and France. His younger brother Manaf Tlass, a Syrian officer, defected from the Assad government and fled to France via Turkey in July 2012.

On 26 July 2012, Firas Tlass expressed his support for Bashar Al Assad's resignation. He further declared that he had provided the Farouq Brigades in the Free Syrian Army, commanded by his cousin Abdul Razzak Tlass, with humanitarian and relief aid.

On 8 March 2013, he told Al Arabiya that Syria had secret business deals with Israel. He said that Damascus’s outward hostility toward Israel was actually a front for political and economic cooperation.

== Personal life ==
Tlass is married to Lubna Alsoufi, a member of one of the leading Sunni families from Lattakia.

He was married before to Rania Al Jabiri since 1984 until they divorced in March 2012. He has five children with her: Yara (born 1989), Mira and Lara (twins, born 1991), Yasmine (born 1998) and Mustafa (born 2000).
