= Nawaf al-Fares =

Syrian diplomat

Nawaf AlFares
- نواف الفارس

Syrian Ambassador to Iraq
- In office September 2008 – July 2012
- Preceded by: Post reestablished
- Succeeded by: Sattam Jadaan Al-Dandah

Personal details
- Born: Nawaf Fares AlSayyah Abu Kamal, Deir ez-Zor, Syria
- Relations: Al-Jarrah Family of the Aqadians
- Children: Ayham
- Occupation: Defector, Policeman, Governor, Diplomat
- Profession: Politician

Nawaf al-Fares (Arabic: نواف فارس الصياح) is the former Syrian ambassador to Iraq who defected from the ruling government led by Bashar al-Assad on 11 July 2012 during the Syrian Civil War.

== Career ==
Fares was a veteran of Assad's rule and held senior positions as a leading member of Syria's diplomatic corps under the late president Hafez al-Assad. He served as high-ranking official of the Syrian Regional Branch of the Arab Socialist Ba'ath Party in Deir al Zour province. Additionally, Fares held senior security posts in Syria. He is also a former provincial governor. He served as the governor of three significant governorates, Latakia Governorate (until 2000), Idlib Governorate (appointed in 2000) and Quneitra Governorate.

He was the first Syrian ambassador to Baghdad after thirty years. His term as ambassador to Iraq began on 16 September 2008. He resigned both from the Ba'ath Party and as Syria's ambassador to Iraq on 11 July 2012.

== Defection ==
Al Jazeera reported on 11 July 2012 that Fares had defected from the Syrian government. His defection was considered to be a significant event in regard to the future of the Syrian uprising. On the same day, Fares posted a video statement on Facebook, arguing that Syrian government forces were killing civilians and that he had joined the ranks of the revolution of the Syrian people. He further called for the members of the Syrian military to join this revolution and to save the country and the citizens. On 12 July 2012, Iraqi Foreign Minister Hoshiyar Zebari told reporters in Paris that Nawaf al Fares is in Qatar.

The Syrian Foreign and Expatriates Ministry in Damascus issued a statement on 12 July 2012 dismissing Fares. The declaration stated that Fares "has been relieved of his duties" and "no longer has any link with the Syrian Embassy in Baghdad." It is further stated by the Ministry that he should be punished due to "legal and disciplinary accountability."

In his 15 July 2012 CNN interview, Fares said that he had tried to convince the Syrian government to change its approach towards the people and that foreign military intervention was needed to end the chaos in Syria. In a BBC interview, Fares warned that the Syrian government would be likely to use chemical weapons against rebels, and raised the possibility that they may have already done so.

== Personal life ==
Fares is a Sunni Muslim from Abu Kamal, near Deir al Zor, an eastern Syrian city. His family is reported to partly be rooted in the Sunni tribe of Iraq's Anbar Province, which extends to Syria's eastern desert. Fares is reported to be the leader of a powerful clan, Al Jarrah, in the Abu Kamal area, adjacent to Iraq. Al Jarrah, is a branch of the Al-Uqaydat tribal confederation, the largest in eastern Syria. The clan has nearly 1.5 million members across 40% of Syria. It also has kinship relations to Saudi Arabia, Kuwait and Qatar. It was powerful and prominent due to its legacy of fighting against the French forces in the 1940s, and Fares' career with the Ba'athist government.
