= Mustafa Tlass =

Syrian military officer and politician (1932–2017)

Colonel General Mustafa Tlass
- مصطفى طلاس
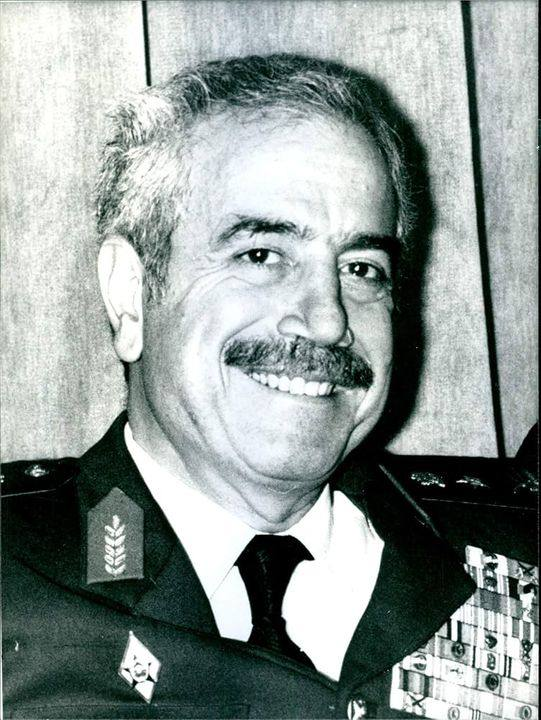
- Tlass in 1986

12th Minister of Defense
- In office 22 March 1972 – 12 May 2004
- President: Hafez al-Assad (1972–2000); Bashar al-Assad (2000–2004)
- Preceded by: Hafez al-Assad
- Succeeded by: Hasan Turkmani

Chief of Staff of the Syrian Army
- In office 1968–1972
- Preceded by: Ahmed Suidani
- Succeeded by: Yusuf Shakkur

Member of the Regional Command of the Syrian Regional Branch
- In office 28 September 1968 – 9 June 2005
- In office 4 April 1965 – December 1965

Personal details
- Born: Mustafa Abdul Qadir Tlass; 11 May 1932 Rastan, First Syrian Republic
- Died: 27 June 2017 (aged 85) Bobigny, France
- Party: Ba'ath Party
- Relations: Nahed Tlass (daughter); Manaf Tlass (son); Firas Tlass (son); Abdul Razzaq Tlass (nephew); Akram Ojjeh (Son-in-law); Mansour Ojjeh (Step-Grandson)

Military service
- Allegiance: Second Syrian Republic (1952–1958); United Arab Republic (1958–1961); Second Syrian Republic (1961–1963); Ba'athist Syria (1963–2004)
- Branch/service: Syrian Arab Army
- Years of service: 1952–2004
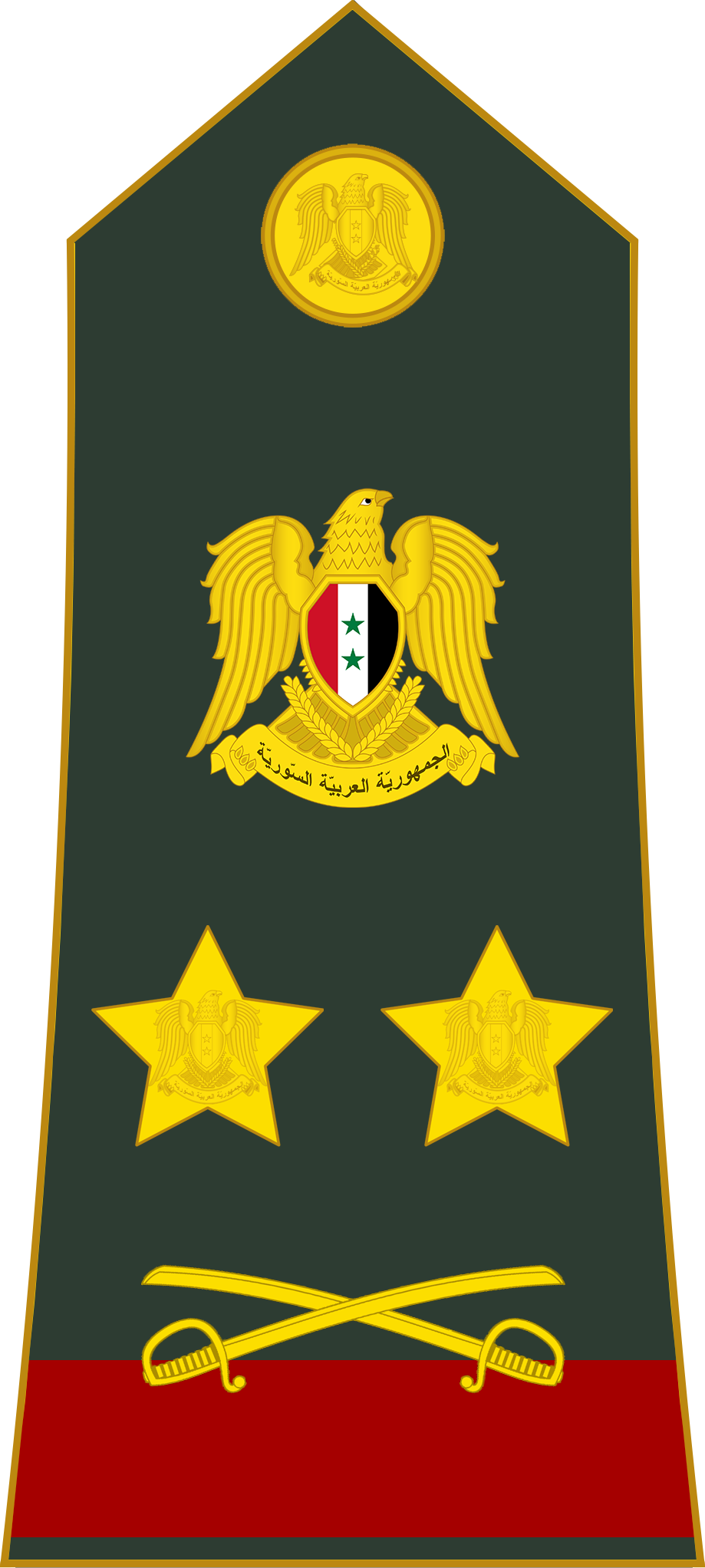
- Rank: Colonel General
- Battles/wars: Six-Day War; Yom Kippur War; Lebanese Civil War; Islamist uprising in Syria; Gulf War

Mustafa Abdul Qadir Tlass (Arabic: مصطفى عبد القادر طلاس, romanized: Musṭafā ʿAbd al-Qādir Ṭalās; 11 May 1932 – 27 June 2017) was a Syrian military officer, author, historian and politician. He served as the Minister of Defense from 1972 to 2004 under Ba'athist-led Syria. He was part of the four-member Regional Command during the Hafez al-Assad era.

== Early life and education ==
Tlass was born on 11 May 1932 in Lower Rastan (al-Tahtani), near Homs, into a prominent Sunni Muslim family from an area with a long tradition of producing military officers. His father, Abdul Qadir Tlass, was a minor Sunni noble who made a living during the Ottoman period by selling ammunition to the Turkish garrisons, and later served as a local chief (mukhtar) under the French Mandate. On the other hand, members of his family also worked for the French occupiers after the First World War. His paternal grandmother was of Circassian origin and his mother was of Turkish descent. Tlass is said to also have some Alawite family connections through his mother. He received primary and secondary education in Homs. In 1952, he entered the Homs Military Academy, where he began a close friendship with Hafez al-Assad. He later completed his general staff training at the Voroshilov Academy in Moscow.

== Career ==
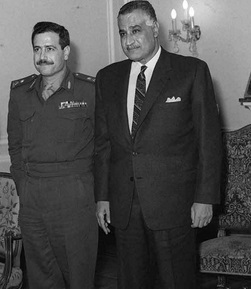
Chief of Staff Tlass meeting Egyptian President Gamal Abdel Nasser in Cairo, 1969

Tlass joined the Ba'ath Party at the age of 15, and met Hafez al-Assad when studying at the military academy in Homs. The two officers became friends when they were both stationed in Cairo during the period of 1958–1961 United Arab Republic merger between Syria and Egypt: while ardent Pan Arab nationalists, they both worked to break up the union, which they viewed as unfairly balanced in Egypt's favor. When Hafez al-Assad was briefly imprisoned by Nasser at the breakup of the union, Tlass fled with his wife and sons to Syria.

During the 1960s, Hafez al-Assad rose to prominence in the Syrian government through the 1963 coup d'état, backed by the Ba'ath party. He then promoted Tlass to high-ranking military and party positions. In 1965, while he was Ba'athist army commander of Homs, Lieutenant Colonel Mustafa Tlass arrested his pro-government comrades. In 1966, an Alawite-led faction within the Ba'ath Party seized power, strengthening Assad's position and, by extension, Tlass's. Tensions within the government soon became apparent, however, with al-Assad emerging as the prime proponent of a pragmatist, military-based faction opposed to the ideological radicalism of the dominant ultra-leftists. Following Syria's defeat in the 1967 Six-Day War, Assad used the resulting political instability to appoint Tlass as Chief of Staff in 1968. Syria's unsuccessful attempt to intervene in the Black September conflict further deepened internal divisions, bringing the power struggle into the open.

In 1969, Tlass led a military mission to Beijing, and secured weapons deals with the Chinese government. In a move deliberately calculated to antagonize the Soviet Union to stay out of the succession dispute then going on in Syria, Mustafa Tlass allowed himself to be photographed waving Mao Zedong's Little Red Book, just two months after bloody clashes between Chinese and Soviet armies on the Ussuri river.

Under cover of the 1970 "Corrective Revolution", Hafez al-Assad seized power and installed himself as a dictator. Tlass was promoted to minister of defense in 1972, and became one of al-Assad's most trusted loyalists during the following 30 years of one-man rule in Syria. As'ad AbuKhalil argues that Mustafa Tlass was well-suited for Hafez al-Assad as a defense minister in that "he had no power base, he was mediocre, and he had no political skills, and his loyalty to his boss was complete." During his term as defense minister, Mustafa Tlass was functional in suppressing all dissent regardless of being Islamists or democrats. Tlass and Assad consistently favored a coordinated military command with Egypt, a policy that directly contributed to the two-front assault on Israeli-occupied territories during the 1973 Yom Kippur War. According to The New York Times, Tlass was closely involved in the Syrian government's response to the 1982 uprising in Hama. In an interview, he stated that he had approved many death sentences and could no longer recall the exact number, and said that during the 1980s, “150 death sentences a week were carried out by hanging in Damascus alone.” He described the government's approach to power by stating, “We used weapons to assume power, and we wanted to hold onto it. Anyone who wants power will have to take it from us with weapons.”

On 19 October 1999, defence minister of China, General Chi Haotian, after meeting with Mustafa Tlass in Damascus to discuss expanding military ties between Syria and China, flew directly to Israel and met with Ehud Barak, the then prime minister and defence minister of Israel where they discussed military relations. Among the military arrangements was a 1 billion dollar Israeli Russian sale of military aircraft to China, which were to be jointly produced by Russia and Israel.

At the beginning of the 2000s, Tlass was also deputy prime minister in addition to his post as defense minister. He was also a member of Baath Party's central committee. His other party roles included the head of the party military bureau and chairman of the party military committee.

== Controversial writings and controversies ==
Tlass attempted to create a reputation for himself as a man of culture and emerged as an important patron of Syrian literature. He published several books of his own, and started a publishing house, Tlass Books, which has been internationally criticized for publishing anti-Semitic materials. In the late 1980s, Dar Tlass lil-Dirasat wa-al-Tarjamah wa-al-Nashr was a major commercial publishing house, and produced more than 30 titles annually, with its 1989 catalogue listing a cumulative total of 669 published titles. The publisher's output spanned a wide range of fields, including reference works, literature and short fiction, Islamic studies, history, cultural heritage, political science, and studies of the Arab-Israeli conflict, among others.

In 1998, Syrian Defense Minister Tlass boasted to Al Bayan newspaper that he was the one who gave the green light to "the resistance" in Lebanon to attack and kill 241 US marines and 58 French paratroopers, but that he prevented attacks on the Italian soldiers of the multi-national force because "I do not want a single tear falling from the eyes of [Italian actress] Gina Lollobrigida, whom [I] loved ever since my youth." In October of the same year, Tlass stated that there was no such country as Jordan, but only "South Syria".

Tlass had also boasted to the National Assembly about cannibalist atrocities committed against Israeli soldiers who fell captive in the Yom Kippur War. "I gave the Medal of the Republic's Hero, to a soldier from Aleppo, who killed 28 Jewish soldiers. He did not use the military weapon to kill them but utilized the ax to decapitate them. He then devoured the neck of one of them and ate it in front of the people. I am proud of his courage and bravery, for he actually killed by himself 28 Jews by count and cash."

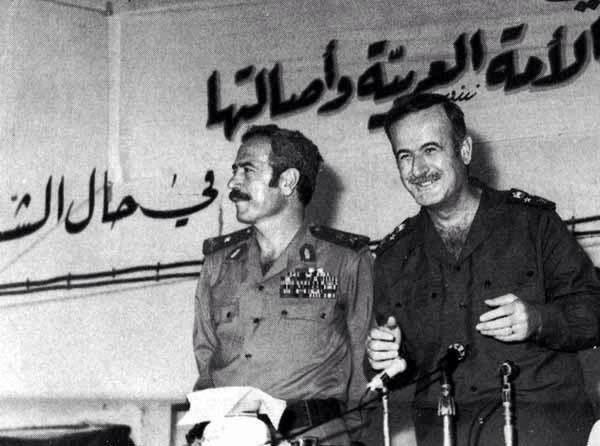
Tlass with Hafez al-Assad, 1970s

There have been three missing Israeli soldiers in the Beqaa valley since the June 1982 war in Lebanon. Tlass allegedly told a Saudi magazine: "We sent Israel the bones of dogs, and Israel may protest as much as it likes."

During his career, Tlass also became known for colorful language. In 1991, when Syria was participating on the Coalition side in the Gulf War, he stated that he felt "an overwhelming joy" when Saddam Hussein sent SCUD-missiles towards Israel. In August 1998, Tlass caused a minor uproar in Arab political circles, when he denounced Palestinian leader Yasser Arafat as "the son of sixty thousand whores." The long-standing conflict between the Assad government and the Palestine Liberation Organization would not end until after Hafez al-Assad's death in 2000.

In 2000, the widow and children of Ira Weinstein, who was killed in a February 1996 Hamas suicide bombing, filed a lawsuit against both Tlass and the head of Syrian military intelligence in Lebanon, Ghazi Kanaan, charging that they were responsible for providing the perpetrators with material resources and training.

In an interview which aired RT on 8 June 2009 (as translated by MEMRI), Tlass claimed that actress Gina Lollobrigida had once told him that he was the "one love in my life." He also claimed that Lady Diana wrote him letters that "were full of love and appreciation", and that Prince Charles gave him a gold-plated Sterling submachine gun as a gift.

=== Books ===
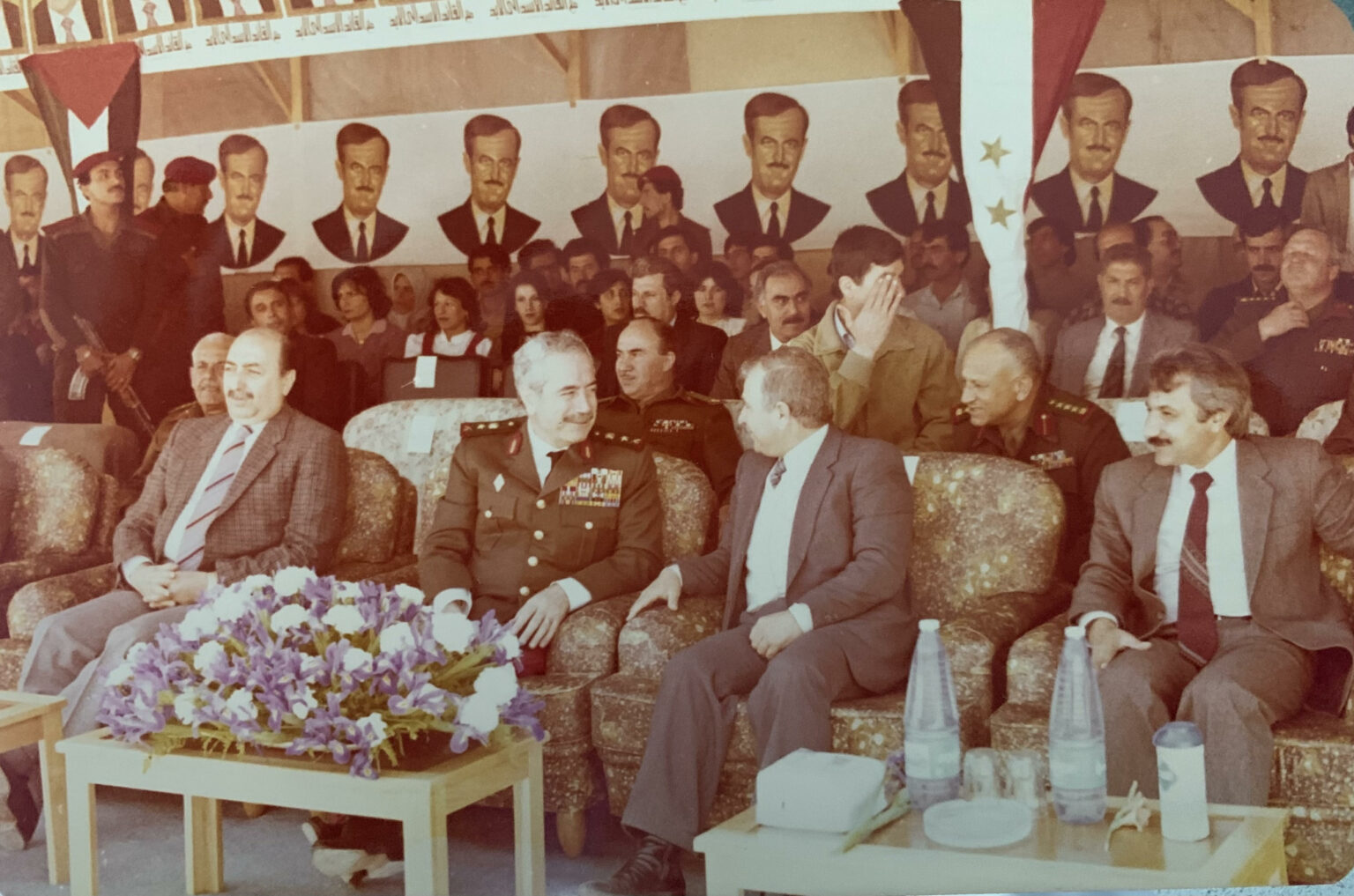
Tlass along with several other military officers and ministers in Hama, 1985

In 1986, he defended his doctoral dissertation on the military strategy of Marshal of the Soviet Union Georgy Zhukov at the Sorbonne. However, on the same year, his doctoral dissertation defense was rejected after the media publicised several anti-Semitic statements made by him.

Tlass also wrote books about Syria's military and political history and also books of poetry, general Arab history, and a history of the military tactics used by Muhammad. His writings allegedly reflect anti-Semitism and belief in conspiracy theories. He also published two-volume memoirs (eventually extended to five), namely Mirat Hayati (Reflections of my life) in 2005. The memoirs were widely ridiculed around the Arab world and outraged Bashar al-Assad due to its content, making various claims about ordering summary executions of dissidents and Israelis and crediting himself for bringing Hafez and Bashar to power. Tlass, whom close friends had described as a sex-obsessed maniac who tried to sleep with as many women as he could, also described in graphic detail his outlandish attempts at seducing women: "As my eyes were fixated on her beautiful breasts I noticed she was wearing a white and transparent nightgown that concealed nothing of God's creation," Tlass wrote about a neighbor he fantasized for days.

==== The Matzah of Zion ====
In 1983, Tlass wrote and published The Matzah of Zion, which is a treatment of the Damascus affair of 1840 that repeats the ancient blood libel that Jews use the blood of murdered non-Jews in religious rituals such as baking Matza bread. In this book, he argues that the true religious beliefs of Jews are "black hatred against all humans and religions," and that no Arab country should ever sign a peace treaty with Israel. Tlass re-printed the book several times, and stood by its conclusions. Following the book's publication, Tlass told Der Spiegel that his false accusation against Jews was valid and that his book is "an historical study ... based on documents from France, Vienna and the American University in Beirut."

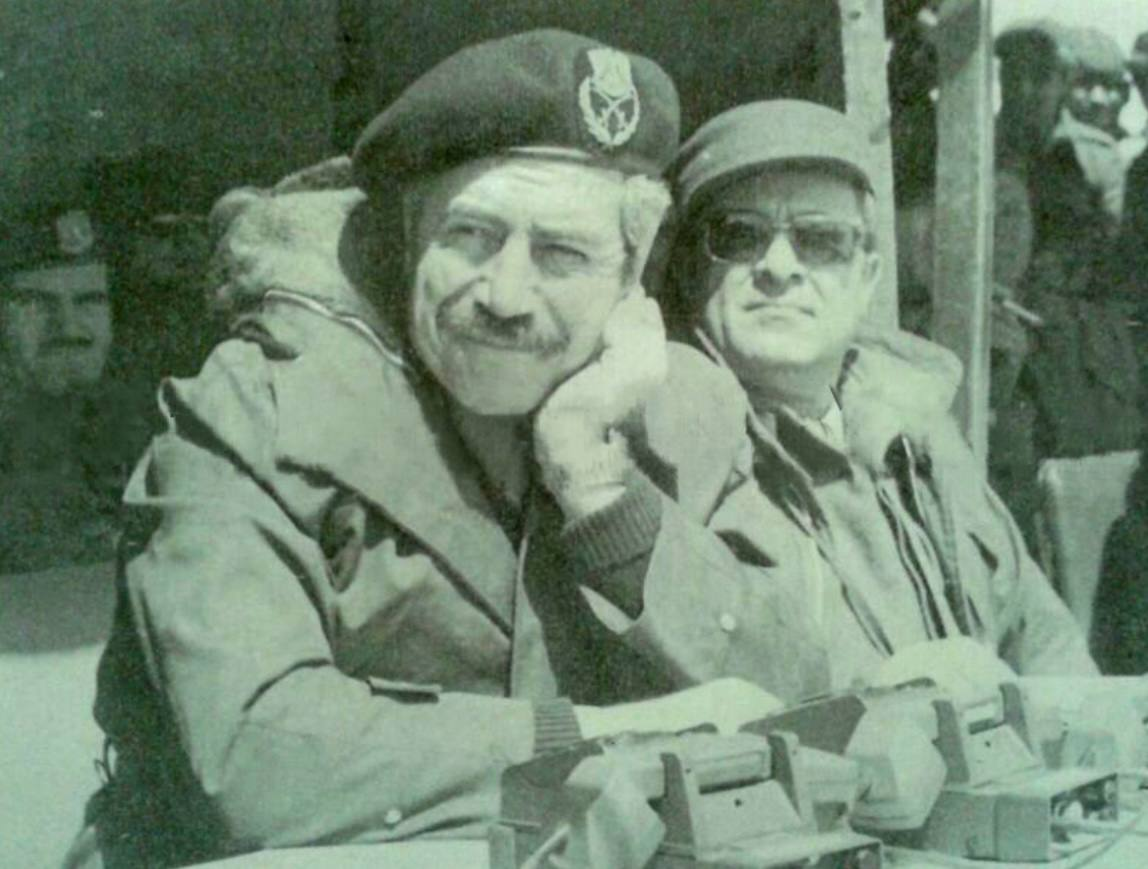
Tlass in 1974

Regarding the book, Tlass stated that "I intend through publication of this book to throw light on some secrets of the Jewish religion based on the conduct of the Jews and their fanaticism", and that both Eastern and Western civilizations threw Jews into ghettos only after recognizing their "destructive badness". He also claimed that since 1840, "every mother warned her child: Do not stray far from home. The Jew may come by and put you in his sack to kill you and suck your blood for the Matzah of Zion."

In 1991 The Matzah of Zion was translated into English. Egyptian producer Munir Radhi subsequently decided it was the ideal "Arab answer" to the film Schindler's List and later announced plans to produce a film adaptation of The Matzah of Zion. The book also reportedly served as what was falsely termed a "scientific" basis for a renewal of the blood libel charge in international forums. In 2001, Al-Ahram published an article titled "A Jewish Matzah Made from Arab Blood", which summarized The Matzah of Zion, falsely concluding that: "The bestial drive to knead Passover matzahs with the blood of non-Jews is [confirmed] in the records of the Palestinian police where there are many recorded cases of the bodies of Arab children who had disappeared being found, torn to pieces without a single drop of blood. The most reasonable explanation is that the blood was taken to be kneaded into the dough of extremist Jews to be used in matzahs to be devoured during Passover."

Zenobia: The Queen of Palmyra

Tlass published a book called Zenobia: The Queen of Palmyra in Arabic in 1985, and it was later translated into French and English. In the book, Tlass describes Zenobia, a third-century ruler of Palmyra, as an Arab heroine who resisted Roman rule and fought foreign control. Tlass wrote the book while serving as Syria's minister of defense, and it reflects the ideas promoted by the Assad government at the time, which connected modern Syria to selected parts of ancient history. He presents Palmyra as part of “Greater Syria” and groups the Palmyrenes with other ancient peoples of the region, who he says opposed Rome and Jewish communities.

The book directly compares Roman rule in ancient Syria to modern conflicts, especially Syria's conflict with Israel. It suggests that Zenobia's struggle was similar to modern Arab resistance to Western powers. Tlass also claims that Jewish communities have long had hatred toward Palmyra, citing passages from the Talmud to argue that this conflict dates back to ancient wars. Scholars note that the book explains Zenobia's defeat as the result of political division among Syrians rather than military causes, and they describe the work as an example of how the Syrian government used ancient history to support nationalism and shape public memory under Baʿthist rule.

== After Hafez al-Assad ==
The succession of Bashar al-Assad, Hafez's son, seems to have been secured by a group of senior officials, including Tlass. After the death of Assad in 2000, a 9-member committee was formed to oversee the transition period, and Tlass was among its members. As defence minister, Tlass also oversaw the constitutional amendment that lowered the presidential age requirement from 40 to 34, enabling Bashar, then 34, to assume the presidency. The People's Assembly introduced the amendment on the night of Hafez al-Assad's death. Tlass is described as supporting the change out of loyalty to Hafez and to preserve the existing power structure.

Whether true or not, Tlass and his supporters were viewed by many as opponents of the discreet liberalization pursued by the younger al-Assad, and to maintain Syria's hardline foreign policy stances; but also as fighting for established privileges, having been heavily involved in government corruption. In February 2002 in the Jordanian daily Al Dustour stated that Tlass submitted his letter of resignation to Bashar al-Assad, and was set to step down in July 2002. However, in 2004, Tlass was replaced by Hasan Turkmani as defense minister. It is also argued that Shawkat pushed for the removal of Mustafa Tlass. Tlass also quit the regional command in 2005.

Mustafa Tlass and his son, Firas, both left Syria after the revolt against Assad began in 2011. Mustafa Tlass left for France for what he described as medical treatment. Firas, a business tycoon, left Syria for Egypt in 2011, too. It is also reported that he is in Dubai. Opposition accounts state that Tlass left Syria partly in response to the regime's sudden and violent crackdown in his hometown of Rastan.

In July 2012, Manaf Tlass, a Syrian officer and another son of Mustafa, defected from the Assad government and fled to Turkey and then to France.

== Personal life and death ==
Tlass married Lamia Al Jabiri, a member of the Aleppine aristocracy, in 1958. His marriage secured his position among the traditional elite and enabled him to advance socially. They had four children: Nahid (born 1958), Firas (born 1960), Manaf (born 1964), and Sarya (born 1978). His daughter Nahid was married to Saudi millionaire arms dealer Akram Ojjeh, forty years her senior. She has lived in Paris since the onset of Syrian uprising. His younger daughter, Sarya, is married to a Lebanese from Baalbak.

Tlass was the only member of the Ba'ath government who had good relations with the traditional social establishment of Syria. His hobbies are said to have included horseback riding, tennis, and swimming.

Tlass died on 27 June 2017 in Avicenne Hospital in Bobigny, France, at the age of 85.

== Honours ==
=== National honours ===
- Syria:
  - Order of the Umayyads (1st class)
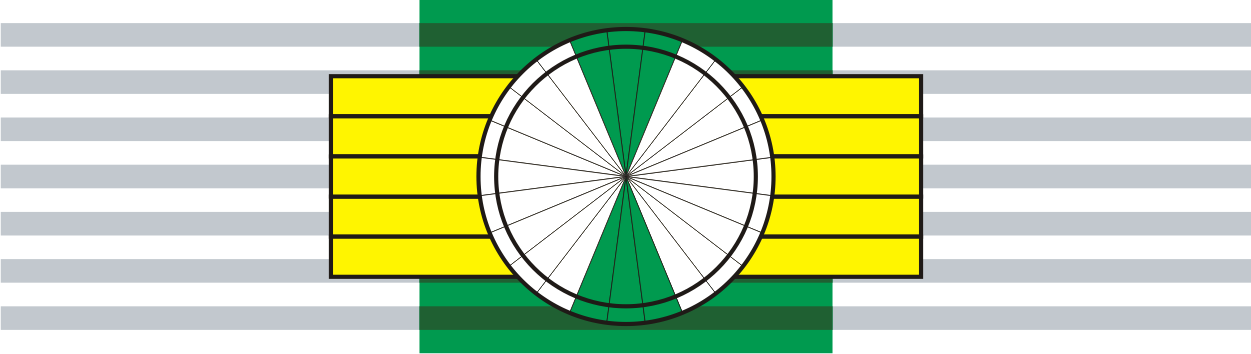
  - Order of Civil Merit (1st class)
  - Order of Military Honor (1st class)
  - Order for Bravery (1st class)
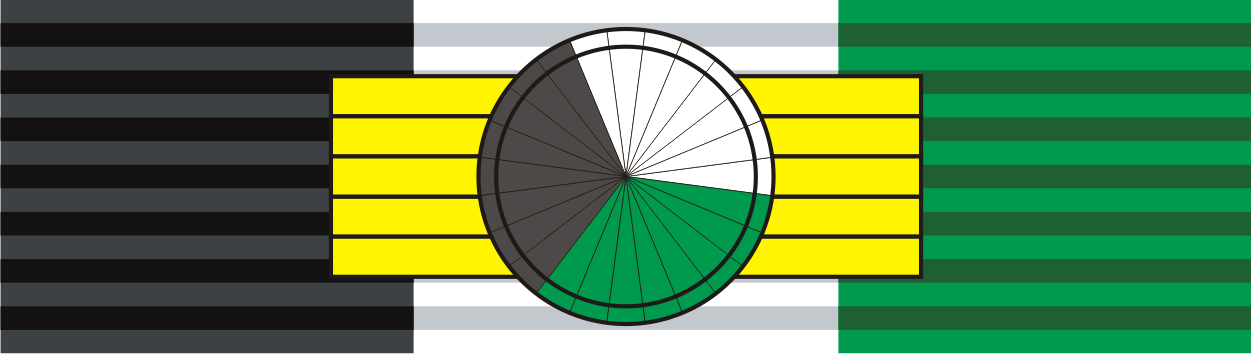
  - Order of Devotion (Special class)
  - Medal for Long and Impeccable Service (Special class)
  - Medal for Preparation
  - Order of Federation
  - Commemorative Medal 'March 8'
  - Commemorative Medal 'October 6'

=== Foreign honours ===
- Austria:
  - Grand Star of the Order of Honour for Services to the Republic of Austria
- Egypt:
  - Knight of the Order of Merit
- East Germany:
  - Scharnhorst Order
  - Combat Order for Services to the People and the Fatherland (Gold)
- Greece:
  - Grand Cross of the Order of Honour
- Kazakhstan:
  - Order of Friendship (1st class)
- Lebanon:
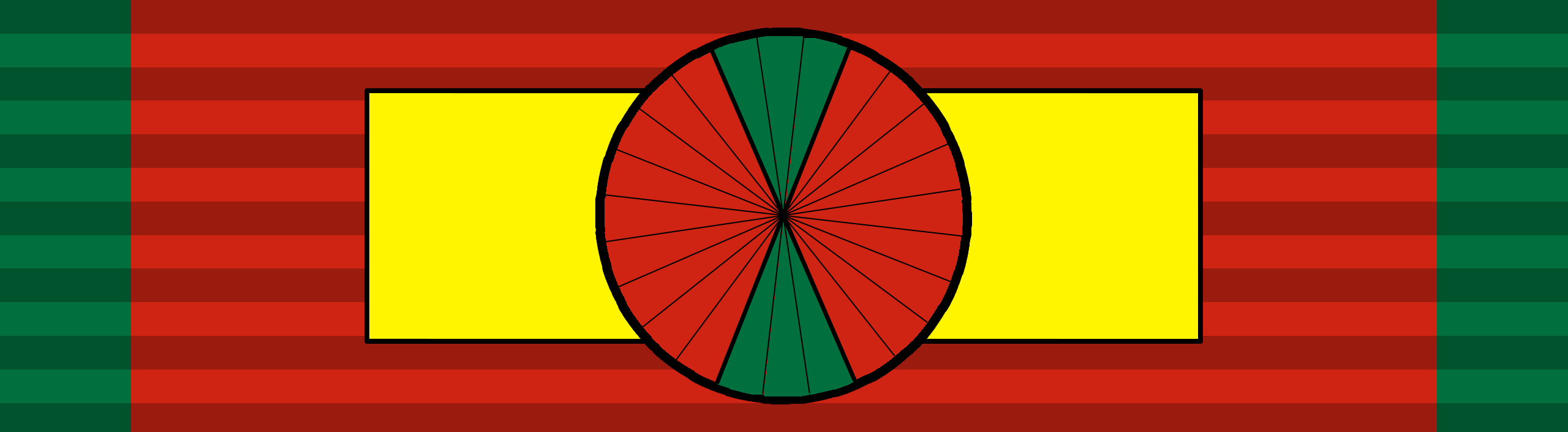
  - Grand Cordon of the National Order of the Cedar
- North Korea:
  - Order of the National Flag (1st class)
  - Order of the National Flag (3rd class)
- Pakistan:
  - Nishan-e-Imtiaz (1st class)
- Russia:
  - Order of Friendship
  - Order of Zhukov
  - Jubilee Medal "50 Years of Victory in the Great Patriotic War 1941–1945"
- Soviet Union:
  - Order of Friendship of Peoples
  - Jubilee Medal "Twenty Years of Victory in the Great Patriotic War 1941-1945"
  - Jubilee Medal "Forty Years of Victory in the Great Patriotic War 1941–1945"

== Bibliography ==
- Dagher, Sam (2019). Assad or We Burn the Country (First U.S. ed.). New York: Little, Brown & Company. ISBN 978-0316556705.
