= Khaled al-Ayoubi =

Syrian diplomat

Khaled al-Ayoubi is a former Syrian diplomat. On 30 July 2012, he informed the Britain's Foreign Office that he left his post as Chargé d'Affaires in the Syrian embassy in London. He was the most senior Syrian diplomat left in London after the British government forced embassy staff to leave in May.

Al-Ayoubi, an ethnic Kurd, was born in Damascus in about 1971. He studied at Damascus University and worked as a computer technician at the Syrian Ministry of Foreign Affairs before undertaking further study from 1995 to 1999. He joined the Syrian diplomatic service in 2001. He was posted to Greece as consul from 2003-2008, and then returned to Syria. In February 2011, he was posted to the Syrian embassy in London as second secretary, and became chargé d'affaires after his predecessor was expelled in May 2012.

Al-Ayoubi claimed that he left because he was unable to: "represent a regime that has committed such violent and oppressive acts against its own people", according to an interview. His departure was characterized as another blow to the Syrian government.

Following his resignation, al-Ayoubi and his family were provided with a safe house by the Foreign Office, and then moved to Barnsley, South Yorkshire, where al-Ayoubi volunteers at the Barnsley Refugee Advice Project, keeps budgerigars, and gardens.
