= Manaf Tlass =

Syrian general (born 1964)

Manaf Tlass مَنَاف طَلَاس
- Born: Manaf Mustafa Tlass; 1964 (age 61–62); Rastan, Syria
- Relatives: Mustafa Tlass (father); Firas Tlass (brother)
- Military career
- Allegiance: Ba'athist Syria
- Branch: Syrian Army
- Service years: 1984–2012
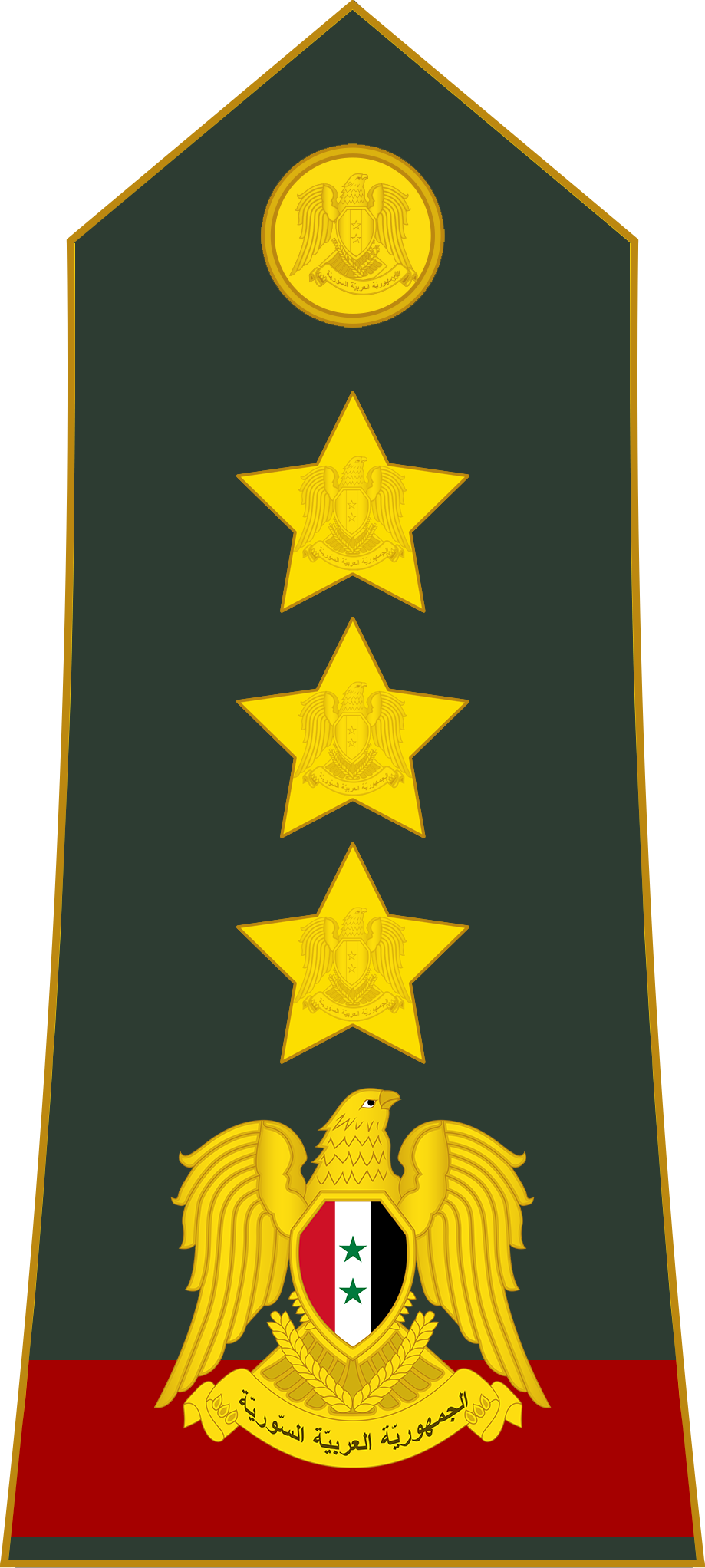
- Rank: Brigadier General
- Unit: Republican Guard
- Commands: 104th brigade
- Conflicts: Syrian Civil War; Rif Dimashq clashes (November 2011–March 2012)

Manaf Tlass or Manaf Tlas (Arabic: مَنَاف طَلَاس, romanized: Manāf Ṭalās; born 1964) is a former Brigadier General of the Syrian Republican Guard and member of Bashar al-Assad's inner circle who defected in 2012. He was the first Syrian Republican Guard commander to defect from the Syrian military and declare support for the opposition.

== Early life and education ==
Tlass was born in Rastan in 1964. He is the son of the former Syrian Defense Minister Mustafa Tlass and Lamia Al Jabiri, a member of an aristocratic Aleppo family. Through paternal lineage, his father descended from the Banu 'Abs tribe of Arabs, with the mukhtar of Ar Rastan named Sheikh Abd al-Qader belonging to the Firzat clan, being the father of Mustafa Tlass (https://dokumen.pub/syrias-peasantry-the-descendants-of-its-lesser-rural-notables-and-their-politics-core-textbooknbsped-9781400845842) while Mustafa’s mother was of Circassian and Turkish origin. Businessman Firas Tlass is his elder brother. The Tlass family was the most famous Sunni family in Syria, known for supporting the government. On the other hand, the members of his family worked for the Ottoman suzerains as well as French occupiers after the First World War.

Tlass was a close friend of Bassel al-Assad, Hafez al-Assad's eldest son and heir apparent until his death in a 1994 car accident. He later became close to Bashar al-Assad; having attended military college with Assad, Bashar al-Assad regarded the Tlass brothers as peers and friends.

In 1980, Manaf took part in a military training camp organized by the Revolutionary Youth Union. Afterward, he attended Damascus University for civil engineering.

== Career ==
After Hafez al-Assad's death in 2000, Tlass became Bashar al-Assad's right-hand-man. He also became a member of the central committee of the Baath Party in 2000. He was also regarded as a potential candidate for leadership in future years. In June 2005, Tlass was reelected to the central committee of the Baath Party.

Tlass tried to help Bashar al-Assad increase his base of support by introducing him to members of the Sunni merchant class. Tlass also advocated reform as early as 2005, but he stressed that Assad was the best hope for reform. Tlass had also reportedly held unsuccessful talks with the Syrian opposition during the 2011 Syrian uprising.

Tlass was promoted to the rank of one-star general in the Republican Guards, which was one of the core military units used to crush the uprising that began in 2011. He commanded the 104th brigade that is located in Douma and Harasta in the Republican Guard together with Brigadier General Issam Zahreddine. This brigade was led by Bashar al-Assad before he became president, and by Bassel al-Assad until his death in 1994.

== Defection ==
Tlass is reported to have become increasingly frustrated over the violent crackdown by the security forces on protesters. He was the first government official meeting with the opposition in March 2011 and trying to open a dialogue and find a political solution. He was also involved in reconciliation efforts in rural Damascus, including Douma, Daraa, al-Tall, Homs and his home town Rastan. His reconciliation efforts are said to have led to house arrest from May 2011 to his defection in July 2012.

There are several accounts from activists of Tlass's role in the uprising. Some argued that he was under house arrest, and exempted from army duty since 2011. The hometown of the Tlass family, Rastan, became an early base for army defectors at the same period. Some activists also stated that the family was under strict supervision for a while due to their suspected sympathy with the uprising.

Tlass tried to meet with Bashar al-Assad via a leading political figure who is not Syrian but is close to Assad a few days before leaving Syria. However, the meeting did not take place.

It was reported that he, along with 23 other officers, defected to Turkey in early July 2012, after the Syrian intelligence services discovered he was a member of the opposition. Bashar al Heraki, a member of the Syrian National Council stated that Manaf Tlass was one of the government's main figures and that his defection was a sign of Bashar al Assad's waning power. The case is reported to be the first such case involving a high-ranking military commander. On 6 July 2012, French Foreign Minister Laurent Fabius stated that Manaf Tlass was on his way to Paris to join his family there.

It was also revealed that his wife and son were in Beirut when Manaf Tlass left Damascus. After Tlass' defection, his wife and son left Beirut and went to Paris.

== After defection ==
In early July 2012, sources close to Tlass reported that he was engaged by the state of Syria and had accused Assad's regime of "taking the country to hell." The sources quoted him as having said: "if I were him, I would've done an Atatürk or resigned the second month the uprising began."

Fabius stated on 12 July 2012 that Manaf Tlass and the members of the Syrian opposition formed contacts. French President Francois Hollande confirmed on 17 July 2012 that Manaf Tlass was in Paris. On the same day, Manaf Tlass published a statement in the French Press Agency. He called for "a constructive transition" in Syria and said the Syrian army had fought against the Syrian people.

Tlass called on Syrians to unite and look towards a post-revolutionary Syria, in video address broadcast from Saudi Arabia on 24 July 2012. It was his first public appearance since he defected in early July 2012.

“I speak to you as a defected member of the Syrian army, who refuses criminal violence … I speak to you as one of the sons of Syria."
“Honorable Syrian army officers do not accept the criminal acts in Syria … Allow me to serve Syria after [President Bashar] al-Assad’s era. We must all unite to serve Syria and promote stability in the country, rebuilding a free and democratic Syria.”
“Allow me to call on a united Syria, the new Syria ... should not be built on revenge, exclusion or monopoly.”

He said he did not blame those troops who have not defected, adding that “whatever mistakes made by some members of the Syrian Arab Army ... those honorable troops who have not partaken in the killing ... are the extension of the Free Syrian Army.”

His cousin, Abdul Razzak Tlass, had announced that his cousin Manaf provided him and several units of the Free Syrian Army with arms in order to counter the military campaign on Rastan. Also, Manaf's older brother, Firas Tlas, declared his support for the opposition. Firas Tlass also admitted to offering humanitarian and relief aid to the Farouq Brigades in the Free Syrian Army which is commanded by his cousin Abdul Razzak Tlas.

=== Visits ===
==== Saudi Arabia ====
Tlass visited Saudi Arabia in the last week of July 2012. His visit was organized by Prince Bandar bin Sultan, newly appointed head of Saudi Intelligence. During the visit, Tlass did the rituals of the Umrah in Mecca. He confirmed his defection in an exclusive video for Saudi-based TV channel Al Arabiya and gave his first interview to the newspaper Asharq Al-Awsat.

==== Turkey ====
Tlass then went to Turkey on 26 July 2012 where he met with the then Turkish foreign minister Ahmet Davutoğlu and the undersecretary of National Intelligence Organization, Hakan Fidan.

== Personal life ==
Tlass is a Sunni Muslim. He is married to Tala Kheir Tlass. His wife is from the Damascus upper middle class, the daughter of a Damascus intellectual and granddaughter of the nationalist merchant, Adib Kheir. They have two sons, Hamza and Mounzer, and a daughter, Lamia Tlass.
