= Damascus attack =

Damascus attack may refer to:

- 1949 Menarsha synagogue attack, Damascus
- 1981 Azbakiyah bombing
- 1986 Damascus bombings
- 2008 Damascus car bombing
- 2011 Damascus bombings
- January 2012 al-Midan bombing
- March 2012 Damascus bombings
- April 2012 Damascus bombings
- 10 May 2012 Damascus bombings
- 18 July 2012 Damascus bombing
- February 2013 Damascus bombings
- 5 September 2016 Syria bombings
- March 2017 Damascus bombings
- Southern Damascus offensive (January–February 2018)
- 2018 missile strikes against Syria
- Southern Damascus offensive (March 2018)
- 2019 Damascus airstrike
- July 2025 Damascus airstrikes

== See also ==
- List of terrorist attacks in Damascus
- Rif Dimashq offensive (disambiguation), a number of offensives
- Siege of Damascus (634)
- Siege of Damascus (1148)
- Siege of Damascus (1400)
- Capture of Damascus, 1918
- Battle of Damascus (1941)
- Battle of Damascus (2012)
