= List of terrorist attacks in Damascus =

This is a list of terror attacks in Damascus within modern Syria (after independence in 1946).

== 1949 ==
On Friday night, August 5, 1949, several hand grenades were thrown into the Menarsha Synagogue in Damascus. 12 Jews, eight of them children, were killed and about 30 others injured. The attack was timed to coincide with the Lausanne Conference, following the armistice agreement which was signed between Israel and Syria on July 20, 1949.

== 1986 ==
The deadliest bombings were executed in Damascus and surrounding areas in 1986. The events caused 204 fatalities, and were blamed by the Syrian authorities upon Iraqi Ba'athist agents, though other alleged perpetrators, like the Muslim Brotherhood, were proposed.

== 2004 ==
- April 28: Three gunmen, a policeman, and one civilian were killed in an attack on the diplomatic quarter of Damascus, damaging a building formerly used by the UN. Police blamed Islamists.

== 2006 ==
- June 2: Four gunmen and two security guards were killed when Syrian security forces foiled an attack by Islamist militants near the studios of Syrian National Television.
- September 12: Three gunmen and a Syrian security guard were killed in a foiled attack on the U.S. embassy. Gunmen tossed grenades over the perimeter walls before opening fire with automatic weapons. A car bomb was detonated outside the embassy, although a truck bomb filled with pipe bombs and gas cylinders failed to explode. Thirteen people were wounded, including two security guards and a Chinese diplomat. Police also captured one gunman, although he later died of his wounds. The Syrian government said the attack was planned in Saudi Arabia and the attackers had no links to al-Qaeda.

== 2008 ==
- 12 February: Assassination of Imad Mughniyeh.
- 27 September: Bombing in Damascus kills 17; Fatah al-Islam blamed.

== 2009 ==
- December 3: A little more than year later another explosion killed at least three people when a bus blew up in Sayyidah Zaynab, a Damascus suburb popular with Iranian and other Shiite pilgrims and named after a shrine dedicated to the granddaughter of Muhammad located there. Syrian officials denied Terrorism was involved, blaming the deaths on an exploding tire and banned reporters from the site.

== 2011 ==
- 2011 Damascus bombings - event in December 2011, during Syrian civil war.

== 2012 ==
- January 2012 al-Midan bombing- during Syrian civil war.
- March 2012 Damascus bombings- during Syrian civil war.
- April 2012 Damascus bombings- during Syrian civil war.
- 10 May 2012 Damascus bombings- during Syrian civil war.
- 18 July 2012 Damascus bombing - during Battle of Damascus of the Syrian civil war.

== 2013 ==
- February 2013 Damascus bombings - attacks in Damascus during Syrian civil war, killing 83 people.

== 2016 ==
- 5 September 2016 Syria bombings

== 2017 ==
- March 2017 Damascus bombings - A series of terrorist attacks in Damascus killed at least 114 people. Tahrir al-Sham, formerly known as the al-Nusra Front, and Islamic State claimed responsibility.

== 2025 ==
- Mar Elias Church attack - A suicide bombing took place at the Mar Elias church in Damascus, killing 23 people and wounding more than 63. The Islamic State claimed responsibility.

== See also ==
- List of terrorist incidents in Syria
