= List of terrorist incidents in Syria =

Terrorist incidents in Syria
Year	Number of incidents	Deaths	Injuries
2025	1	25	63
2020	2	51	93
2019	7	107	252
2018	1	258	180
2017	3	294	150
2016	384	2,761	2,830
2015	485	3,916	2,978
2014	328	3,301	1,980
2013	278	1,558	2,237
2012	179	876	1,927
2011	49	163	215
2010	0	0	0
2009	0	0	0
2008	1	18	14
2007	0	0	0
2006	1	5	0
2005	0	0	0
2004	1	4	2
2003	0	0	0
2002	0	0	0
2001	0	0	0
2000	0	0	0
1999	0	0	0
1998	1	0	0
1997	1	2	0
1996	2	15	50
1995	0	0	0
1994	0	0	0
1993	0	0	0
1992	0	0	0
1991	0	0	0
1990	0	0	0
1989	1	0	0
1988	0	0	0
1987	0	0	0
1986	4	8	8
1985	1	30	30
1984	1	0	1
1983	1	1	0
1982	20	98	23
1981	41	192	223
1980	33	89	27
1979	28	80	31
1978	1	0	0
1977	3	1	0
1976	2	5	35
1975	2	0	0
1974	4	1	9
1973	0	0	0
1972	0	0	0
1971	0	0	0
1970	0	0	0

This is a timeline of incidents in Syria that have been labelled as terrorism and are not believed to have been carried out by a government or its forces (see state terrorism and state-sponsored terrorism).

== 2008 ==
Damascus bombing 2008: A car bomb exploded in the Sayed Qader neighborhood of Damascus on September 27, 2008, killing 17 people and injuring 14 others.

== 2011 ==
- 2011 Damascus bombings - On 23 December 2011, two seemingly coordinated bombings occurred in the Syrian capital of Damascus. The alleged suicide car bombs exploded outside Syrian military intelligence agency buildings, killing 44 people and injuring 166. The government and opposition forces blamed each other for the bombings.

== 2012 ==
- January 2012 al-Midan bombing - On 6 January 2012, a bomb exploded in the Al-Midan district of Damascus, Syria. According to the Syrian government, a suicide bomber attacked buses carrying riot police shortly before an anti-government protest was to begin. It said that 26 people were killed and over 60 were injured. Jabhat al-Nusra claimed responsibility.
- February 2012 Aleppo bombings - On 10 February 2012, two large bombs exploded at Syrian security forces buildings in Aleppo. According to the Syrian government and state media, the blasts were caused by two suicide car bombs. It reported that 28 people were killed (24 members of the security forces and four civilians) and 235 wounded. Jabhat al-Nusra claimed responsibility.
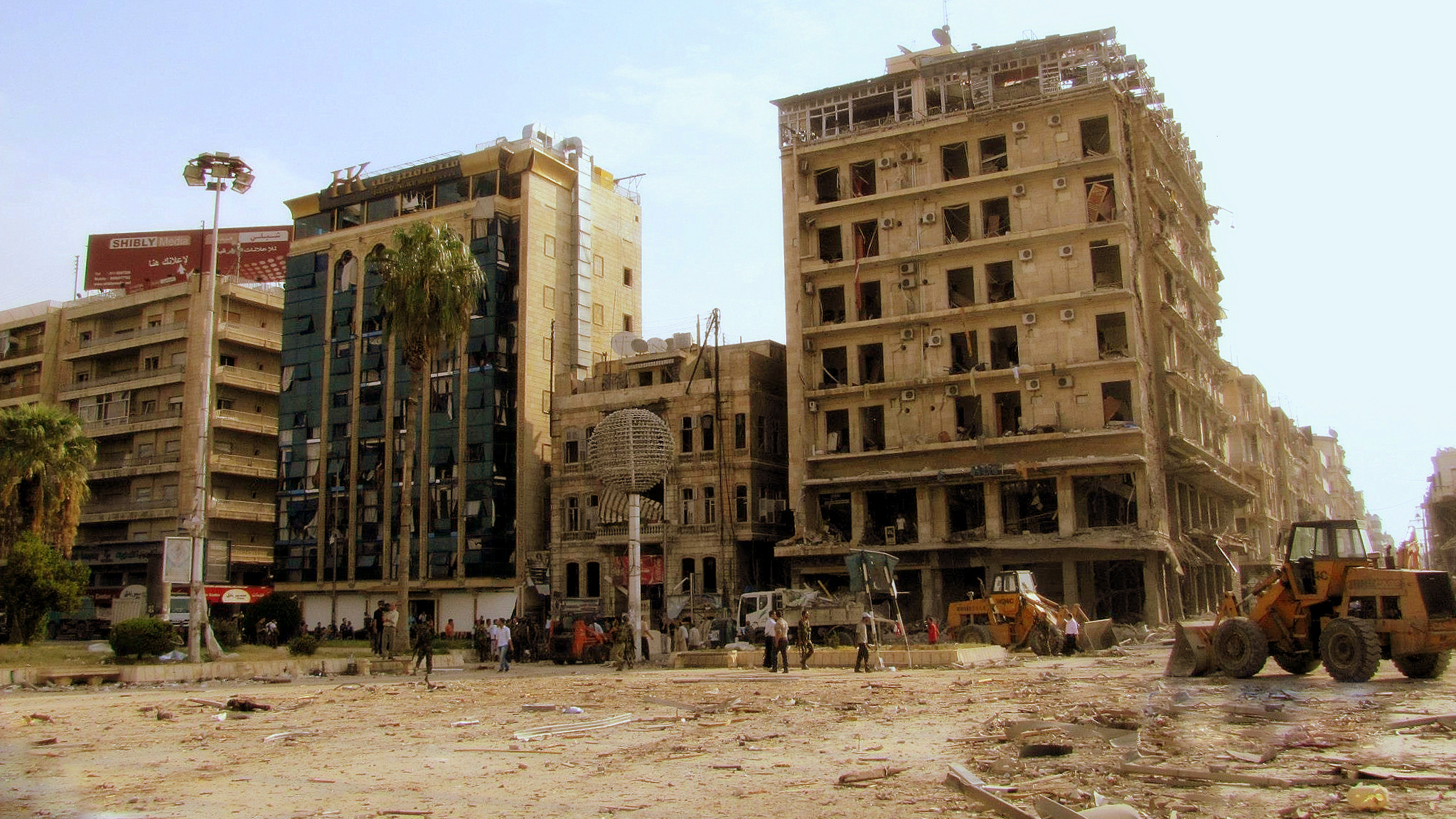
  The scene at Saadallah Al-Jabiri Square in Aleppo after the attacks on 3 October 2012
- March 2012 Damascus bombings - The March 2012 Damascus bombings were two large car bombs that exploded in front of the air intelligence and criminal security headquarters in the Syrian capital of Damascus. At least 27 people were reported killed and over a 140 injured. Jabhat al-Nusra claimed responsibility.
- March 2012 Aleppo bombing
- The 27 April 2012 Damascus bombings was a suicide attack that targeted the Syrian military, killing nine people. It was claimed by the Al-Nusra Front.
- The 30 April 2012 Idlib bombing was a car bombing that targeted the Syrian military in Idlib, killing twenty people.
- The 10 May 2012 Damascus bombings were carried out using a pair of car bombs detonated by suicide bombers outside of a military intelligence complex in Damascus, Syria. Combined, the perpetrators detonated more than 1,000 kilograms (2,200 lb) of explosives, tearing the facade off a 10-story building. With 55 people confirmed dead and almost 400 others injured, the attack was the deadliest bombing to date in the Syrian civil war.
- The 2012 Deir ez-Zor bombing involved a car bomb blast in the Syrian city of Deir ez-Zor killing 9 people on 19 May 2012. The blast struck a parking lot for a military intelligence complex.
- The 18 July 2012 Damascus bombing was an attack that killed the Syrian Defence minister Dawoud Rajiha and the deputy Defence minister Assef Shawkat, brother in law of the president. The bombing targeted the National Security headquarters In Damascus where senior officials were meeting to discuss the security situation in the country. The Interior minister Mohammad Ibrahim al-Shaar was also seriously wounded.
- October 2012 Aleppo bombings - at least 34 people were killed in a series of bombings in the city's main square.
- December Aqrab massacre
- December 12 bombings at Syrian Interior Ministry in Damascus' southwestern district of Kfar Sousa killed 7 and wounded 50 according to SANA news agency.

== 2013 ==
- The Aleppo University bombings took place on January 15 and killed at least 82 people at the Aleppo University.
- 1 February 2013 - Bombing in Sahsah, Quneitra area killed 53 military intelligence employees. Responsibility was taken by Al-Nusra Front.
- A series of bombings in the capital Damascus killed more than 80 and injured at least 250 others on February 21. A massive car bomb exploded close to the offices of the Syrian Ba'ath Party, killing 59 and injuring more than 200 others. The attack, which killed mostly civilians, was the deadliest to occur in the capital during the country's civil war. Both the Syrian government and the Syrian National Coalition condemned the blast, while suspicions were placed on the Islamist Al-Nusra Front. In addition, three bombings killed 22 people and injured 50 others in the suburb of Barzeh. Most of the victims in these attacks were government soldiers.
- March 21 — An explosion in the Eman Mosque of Damascus kills 42 and wounds at least 82 people. A Sunni cleric, Assad's supporter, Sheikh Mohammad Said Ramadan al-Buti was killed in the blast. The bombing occurred when the mosque was filled with worshippers gathered for Friday prayers.
- April 8 — A bombing at Syrian Central Bank building in Damascus killed at least 15 and wounded at least 53 people.
- April 29 — A blast next to former Interior Ministry building in Damascus killed six people. Syrian prime minister Wael al-Halqi survived.
- April 30 — Another car bomb explosion in Damascus killed 13 and injured 70 people. SOHR reported 9 civilian and 7 military casualties.
- June 11 — Two suicide bombers killed al least 14 people in the centre of Damascus.
- June 27 — A suicide bombing happened in a Christian district of Damascus, killing four people. It is believed that the target was a Shiite Muslim charity located there.
- October 19 — A suicide bombing happened in the entrance of Jaramana, in Rif Dimashq by a member of Al-Nusra Front, wounded 16 civilians, a lot of fighters of both sides were killed by fighting that followed
- November 6 — At least 8 people killed and another 50 were wounded after a bomb exploded in Damascus

== 2014 ==
- January 20 — Two car bombs exploded at rebel-held post on the Syrian-Turkish border in Bab al-Hawa, killing at least 16, the opposition reported.
- February 23 — A suicide bombing in Aleppo, organized by ISIS, claimed lives of 7 Ahrar ash-Sham members, including Abu Khalid al-Suri, a commander of the group and al-Qaeda representative.
- April 9 — Two car bombs exploded in Homs, killing at least 25 and wounding 107 people. Both bombs hit Karam al-Luz, a predominantly Alawite district.
- May 8 - The Islamic Front had bombed the Carlton Citadel Hotel, killing 14–50.
- August 14 - Islamic State militants mass execute an estimated 700 to 1,200 civilians (all males aged 14 and older) from the Sunni tribe of Sheitat in eastern Deir ez-Zor.
- October 1 — Twin terrorist attacks killed 45 civilians and wounded over 100 others at two neighboring elementary schools in Akrama, Homs; most of the victims were women and children. The first attack took place when a car bomb loaded with gas cylinders and C-4 explosives was detonated at the front gate of the first school while students were being dismissed. Following the first explosion, a suicide bomber then detonated himself at the gate of the neighboring school while people were gathering to take their children home. The perpetrators were related to Jund al-Sham, a group linked to the Abdullah Azzam Brigades.

== 2015 ==
- 26 June 2015 Islamist attacks
- 11 December - Tell Tamer bombings: Three truck bombs killed 60 people and injured more than 80.
- 12 December - Homs car bombing killed 16, and injured many more.
- 30 December - Qamishli bombings in Wusta, a Christian district of Qamishli, killed 16 people.

== 2016 ==
- 25 January - A suicide bomber driving a fuel tank blew himself up at a checkpoint controlled by Syrian rebel group Ahrar ash-Sham in the contested city of Aleppo. The blast killed 23 people including four of the group's commanders and four civilians. No group claimed responsibility.
- 31 January - At least 45 people were killed and 110 wounded in twin blasts in the mainly Shi'ite neighbourhood of Sayeda Zeinab.
- 3 February - At least 10 people are killed and 40 others injured after rockets reportedly fired by rebels hit pro-government neighborhoods in the southern city of Daraa.
- 21 February - Twin bomb blasts hit the predominantly Alawite neighborhood of al-Zahra in Homs with at least 57 people reportedly killed and dozens injured. Islamic State claimed responsibility.
- 21 February - Islamic State militants detonated a car bomb and later launched two suicide bombings, about 400 meters from Sayyidah Zaynab Mosque, a Shia shrine, believed to contain the grave of Prophet Muhammad's granddaughter. 83 people were killed and 178 wounded, including children. Syrian media said the attack occurred when pupils were leaving school in the area. Foreign led Syrian Observatory said 68 were killed. At least 60 shops were damaged as well as cars in the area. Islamic State claimed responsibility.
- 2 March - A suicide car bomb killed 18 rebels of the Syrian Revolutionary Front, a member of the Free Syrian Army in the province of Quneitra;
- 23 March - Snipers of Farouq Brigades and Ahrar al-Sham fired at civilians in the town of Al-Fu'ah, killing two civilians and wounding another three, local sources said.
- 27 March - A suicide bomber blew himself up in the outskirts of Salamiyah, killing two people and wounding several others. Soon after, another suicide bomber blew himself up at the entrance to the village of Teeba, killing four and wounding several others. Islamic State claimed responsibility for the attack in Salamiyah.
- 5 April - The explosion of a car bomb in Maarrat al-Nu'man in the province of Idleb in Syria has killed a woman and injured several people.
- 8 April - IS militants execute 20 workers who were captured earlier this week at a cement factory situated to the east of Damascus.
- 23 May - Jableh and Tartous bombings in Jableh and Tartus, coastline cities in Syria, killed at least 184 people. The Syrian government had accused Qatar, Saudi Arabia and Turkey of being behind the wave of bombings in these cities.
- 27 July - Qamishli bombings killed more than 44 and more than 171 were wounded. The IS praised the attacks and claimed responsibility. The city of Qamishli was also the site of multiple car bombings since 2015.
- 15 August - A suicide bombing in Atme killed 50 people. The attack was claimed by IS.
- 5 September - A series of bombings killed at least 48 people. The suicide bombers simultaneously exploded in the Syrian cities of Tartus, Homs, Damascus, and Hasakah.

== 2017 ==
- 7 January 2017 - A car bomb in front of a courthouse in Azaz killed at least 60 people, mostly civilians.
- March 2017 Damascus bombings - A series of terrorist attacks in Damascus killed at least 114 people. Tahrir al-Sham, formerly known as the al-Nusra Front, and IS claimed responsibility.
- 15 April 2017 - A car bomb targets a convoy of buses carrying civilian evacuees in rebel-held western Aleppo, killing more than 120 people, mostly children.

== 2018 ==
- 25 July 2018 - Islamic State militants carried out suicide bombings and gun attacks in the city of As-Suwayda and a number of villages in the southern Syrian governorate of As-Suwayda, killing 255 people, including 142 civilians, and injuring 180 others. At least 63 terrorists were also killed, including the suicide bombers. The jihadists also seized hostages from the villages they had attacked.

== 2019 ==
- 2 June 2019 – Over 34 are killed and 80 are injured in the June 2019 Syria bombings.
- November 2019 – 73 are killed and more than 172 are injured in the November 2019 Syria bombings.

== 2020 ==
- 28 April 2020 – A fuel tanker, rigged with a hand grenade, exploded in a crowded market place in the Syrian town of Afrin. The blast killed at least 46 people, including 11 children, and injured dozens more. The Ministry of National Defense (Turkey) blamed the attack on the YPG, the Syrian Democratic Council and the commander-in-chief of the Syrian Democratic Forces, Mazloum Abdi, condemned the bombing, while a German newspaper suggested jihadist groups may have been behind the attack.
- 19 July 2020 – A car bomb exploded in Azaz, leaving five dead and 43 wounded, according to Turkish state media.

== 2022 ==
- 29 December 2022 – A rocket attack on a convoy of buses transporting oil workers in eastern Syria kills 10 people.

== 2023 ==
- 5 October 2023 – 2023 Homs drone strike.

== 2025 ==
- 22 May 2025 – ISIS detonated a car bomb targeted a vehicle belonging to Syrian government forces in the Al-Safa region of Suwayda Governorate—a remote desert area in southern Syria. The group claimed the bombing killed or wounded seven soldiers,however, the Britain-based Syrian Observatory for Human Rights said that the attack on government forces had only killed one civilian and wounded three soldiers.
- 28 May 2025 – ISIS carried out a bombing in the Al-Safa region of Suwayda Governorate, targeting fighters from the U.S.-backed Syrian Free Army. The group used an improvised explosive device (IED) to strike a FSA vehicle, claiming to have killed one fighter and wounded three others.
- 22 June 2025 – A suicide bombing took place at the Mar Elias church in Damascus killing 25 and wounding 63. Saraya Ansar al-Sunnah claimed responsibility, whilst the Syrian government claimed the Islamic State was responsible.
- 26 December 2025 – An IED bombing during Friday prayers at the Alawite-majority Iman Ali bin Abi Talib mosque in Homs, Syria, killed 8 and injured 18. Saraya Ansar al-Sunnah claimed responsibility.
