= Damascus bombing =

Damascus bombing may refer to:

- 1981 Damascus bombing
- 1986 Damascus bombings
- 2008 Damascus car bombing
- 2011 Damascus bombings
- March 2012 Damascus bombings
- 10 May 2012 Damascus bombings
- 18 July 2012 Damascus bombing
- 2016 Damascus bombings
- March 2017 Damascus bombings
- 2018 Damascus Bombing
- 2026 Damascus bombings
