= Timeline of the Syrian civil war (January–April 2012) =

The following is a timeline of the Syrian Civil War from January to April 2012, during which time the spate of protests that began in January 2011 lasted into another calendar year. An Arab League monitoring mission ended in failure as Syrian troops and anti-government militants continued to do battle across the country and the Syrian government prevented foreign observers from touring active battlefields, including besieged opposition strongholds. A United Nations-backed ceasefire brokered by special envoy Kofi Annan met a similar fate, with unarmed UN peacekeepers' movements tightly controlled by the government and fighting.

== January 2012 ==
=== 1 January ===
Multiple reports on Twitter claimed that Syrians in several restive neighborhoods and cities, including al-Midan in central Damascus, Baba Amr in Homs, and Idlib city, were marching in New Year's Day protests against the government in the early morning, shortly after midnight. The opposition Local Coordinating Committees announced it had confirmed 5,862 deaths in the Syrian uprising during 2011, including 287 prisoners allegedly tortured to death. The LCC also announced the first confirmed death from the uprising in 2012, a wounded person who died due to insufficient blood plasma supply at a hospital. That death toll rose to eight, several of them fatalities from Syrian security forces firing on protesters in the Damascene suburb of Daria, the LCC reported near the end of the day.

Neoconservative commentator Nick Cohen, writing for the British newspaper The Guardian, said that the Western world should intervene militarily to oust President Bashar al-Assad and stop the Syrian Army from committing further human rights violations. The editorial echoed opposition claims that interrogators in Aleppo had invented a new type of torture wherein detainees are forced to stand on a heated metal plate until they confess or else collapse from extensive damage to their feet.

The Arab Parliament, a consultative pan-Arab body created by the Arab League, called for the withdrawal of the supranational organization's observers from Syria. Ali El-Salem El-Dekbas, the speaker of the parliament, said the observers were doing no good and it was a disgrace to keep them in Syria with the crackdown ongoing. "The mission of the Arab League team has missed its aim of stopping the killing of children and ensuring the withdrawal of troops from the Syrian streets, giving the Syrian regime a cover to commit inhumane acts under the noses of the Arab League observers", Dekbas said in a statement.

Assad insider and Syrian security officer Colonel Hafez Makhlouf's plans to visit Switzerland were waylaid when the Swiss Federal Tribunal ruled that Makhlouf should not be granted a visa. Makhlouf had reportedly planned to consult with an attorney in Switzerland on a bid to overturn international sanctions freezing his assets and restricting his travel.

=== 2 January ===
Nabil Elaraby, secretary-general of the Arab League, defended the observer mission after the Arab Parliament's call for its withdrawal. Elaraby claimed that, as a result of the monitors' presence placing pressure on the Syrian government to comply with the Arab peace initiative, Syrian Army (SA) tanks had been withdrawn from cities, almost 3,500 detainees had been released, and humanitarian aid had been delivered to formerly besieged cities. However, contradicting mission leader General Mohammed Ahmed Mustafa al-Dabi's remarks on Newshour two days earlier, Elaraby acknowledged snipers remained in several areas and shooting was still ongoing, though it was hard for monitors to tell who was shooting and at whom. Opposition activists contested Elaraby's remarks, telling the Los Angeles Times that many tanks had not withdrawn and were being hidden within striking distance of city centers in restive areas. Meanwhile, Israeli Defence Minister Ehud Barak told the Knesset that he judged Assad's remaining time in power could be measured in weeks.

The opposition Syrian Revolution General Commission (SRGC) said four were killed in Syria by security forces as of 9 am local time. The Syrian Arab News Agency (SANA), the state-run media outlet in Syria, said a school worker was killed by gunmen holding her hostage and a journalist died of wounds suffered in a shooting in Daraya, a Damascus suburb, some days earlier.

In northern Syria's Idlib Governorate, near the border with Turkey, the opposition Syrian Observatory For Human Rights (SOHR) said that, despite a self-imposed moratorium on offensive actions against the regime during the Arab League mission, Free Syrian Army (FSA) fighters captured two military checkpoints and took several dozen soldiers prisoner, and clashed with security forces at a third, leaving an unspecified number of SA soldiers dead or wounded. The claim could not be immediately confirmed due to tight restrictions on foreign media in Syria.

=== 3 January ===
According to the SOHR, at least 18 people were killed in Jassem during clashes between SA soldiers after loyalist troops allegedly fired on comrades who were attempting to defect. Security forces swept through the area, detaining more than 100, after the fighting. Witnesses said several were killed when security forces fired live ammunition into demonstrators massing in Hama.

According to SANA, a policeman was shot dead outside Homs National Hospital and another policeman was shot dead at al-Khudra market, Idlib. The Syrian government claimed "terrorists" destroyed a gas pipeline near Rastan, disrupting the electricity supply to parts of the country.

FSA leader Colonel Riad al-Asaad said the FSA may mount "a huge escalation of our operations" in coming days. However, some analysts cast aspersions on the claim, suggesting Asaad may be more a figurehead than a practical leader.

President Nicolas Sarkozy, the French head of state, accused Assad of committing "massacres" in Syria. His criticism was echoed by French Foreign Minister Alain Juppe, who called on the Syrian government to allow the Arab League's monitors unrestricted access. In Cairo, the Arab League called an emergency meeting for 7 January to review the observer mission's work and discuss its future.

=== 4 January ===
Syrian Defence Ministry official Mahmoud Sleiman Hajj Hamad defected to the opposition, The Guardian and other major news outlets reported. Hamad was the Head Inspector of the Syrian Ministry of Defence. He also held a press conference on Wednesday in Cairo to announce his defection. In an interview with Al Jazeera, Hamad, who was also an inspector at the monetary center for the interior ministry, denied government claims that the ongoing violence was caused by "terrorists" aided from abroad.

"We were analysing and seeing for ourselves that the regime's story about armed gangs going out and killing protesters was all lies," he said. "I confirm there are no armed gangs, they are all unarmed protesters".

Hamad said the government has spent about $40m on loyalist militias to crush demonstrations since March, as security forces, at times backed by tanks, laid siege to protests hubs across the nation.

"While auditing, I found two billion Syrian pounds [$40m] paid out to the regime's paid thugs, and seen an increase in the spending of the intelligence and defense ministries for the purpose of paying thugs. We saw them preparing and heading out in their armored vehicles and buses toward the young protesters and killing them. It has been happening since the beginning of the protests".

Hamad also said most government officials and employees want to defect but are afraid of the consequences.

"Syrian government officials live in a kind of prison...No one can go anywhere without being accompanied by a member of the security services," he added.

Hamad continued that he has seen proof that Iran and Iraq are aiding the Syrian government's crackdown. Hamad also praised the FSA.

Meanwhile, the LCC reported at least five deaths and numerous injuries it described as "serious" as a result of security forces' actions. The SNC announced a new official website at syriancouncil.org.

SANA reported that a gas pipeline and a bridge were bombed near al-Rastan. Mihajja Bridge in Daraa Countryside was also reportedly damaged by a bomb, which targeted a police patrol. The blast and gunfire that followed reportedly killed one policeman and wounded five. Meanwhile, a Baath Party worker was shot dead as he drove his car in Hama Countryside, SANA said.

=== 5 January ===
Qatari Prime Minister Hamad bin Jassim al-Thani criticized the Arab League mission in Syria, saying after a meeting with United Nations Secretary-General Ban Ki-moon in New York City, "I said we must evaluate the types of mistakes it made and without a shadow of a doubt I see mistakes, even though we went in to observe, not to stop the violence." He said he had suggested to Ban that the UN could take a role in training Arab League personnel in how to monitor human rights situations in the future. Despite Sheikh Hamad's remarks, Reuters reported citing sources within Arab governments that the Arab League was likely to decide over the weekend to keep the observers in Syria. Meanwhile, SNC President Burhan Ghalioun suggested a military intervention in Syria would not need to be NATO-led and could be done on a more limited scale than in the Libyan Civil War. Influential Iranian parliamentarian Alaeddin Boroujerdi took the opposite tack, accusing Turkey of threatening the "stability" of the region by criticizing the Syrian government and harboring the FSA and other political dissidents. Boroujerdi called for Ankara to modify its stance to be in line with Tehran's approach of rejecting all international criticism of Damascus' handling of the uprising.

In Syria itself, the government reported it had released 552 detainees "whose hands were not stained with blood". Kurdish media reported the death of a young Kurdish man in Harasta and three injuries to Kurds in Qamishlo, all allegedly at the hands of loyalist snipers. The accounts could not be independently confirmed.

According to SANA, a policeman and two bystanders were killed in a drive-by-shooting in Homs, while another two policemen were injured by an explosive device in al-Tarnabeh, Idlib province. Two rebels were allegedly killed when a bomb prematurely exploded in Idlib city industrial zone. Meanwhile, the mayor of al-Sina'a, al-Tadamon and Basatin Saleh district was shot dead outside his house in the city of Jableh, SANA reported.

=== 6 January ===
Syrian state television reported that dozens of people died in a suicide bombing in the al-Midan quarter of Damascus (see January 2012 al-Midan bombing). The attack allegedly targeted a police bus, leaving 25 people dead and 46 wounded. The Syrian government immediately called the attack a "continuation of the terrorist acts targeting innocent civilians" and said it "reflects the criminal mentality of perpetrators and their antagonism towards moral heritage and national values", while Colonel Asaad and the SNC both issued statements accusing the government of staging the attack to sully the opposition's image and deter a planned protest in the area, one of the hubs of the uprising. Later in the day, SANA reported that an explosion caused by "terrorists" had severed an oil pipeline between Hama and Idlib governorates.

Meanwhile, according to Al Arabiya, an Arab League team of monitors withdrew from the Damascus suburb of Arbeen after loyalist forces shot at them as they toured the streets. CNN reported that the incident occurred when protesters surrounded the monitors, chanting slogans against the government, and security forces opened fire on them, endangering the observers.

A Syrian opposition member claimed that he learned from anonymous security forces in Aleppo that the Syrian government was planning an orchestrated bombing in Aleppo.

In Friday protests, activists said at least 35 were killed throughout Syria, including in the Kfar Souseh neighborhood of Damascus, according to a witness who said he saw security forces open fire on unarmed demonstrators. Major protests also took place in Aleppo, Idlib, Qamishli, Deir ez-Zor, Homs, and elsewhere in Damascus, among other parts of Syria. Three soldiers attempting to defect were shot dead in Rastan, according to the LCC.

According to SANA, men in military uniform launched a gun attack on Sur police station in Deraa Countryside, killing two policemen and wounding six. It also reported that a colonel and lieutenant were shot dead as they drove through Homs, that a policeman was shot dead in Idlib city, and that the mayor of al-Amqieh Municipality in Hama province was assassinated.

Brigadier General Mustafa al-Sheikh of the SAA, who previously defected in December, publicly announced his defection on Al Jazeera on 6 January; the highest-ranking defector so far.

=== 7 January ===
Colonel Afeef Mahmoud Suleiman of the Syrian Air Force logistics division defected along with at least 50 of his men, ordering his men to protect protesters in the city of Hama. "We are from the Army and we have defected because the government is killing civilian protesters. The Syrian Army attacked Hama with heavy weapons, air raids and heavy fire from tanks...We ask the Arab League observers to come visit areas affected by air raids and attacks so you can see the damage with your own eyes, and we ask you to send someone to uncover the three cemeteries in Hama filled with more than 460 corpses," Colonel Suleima said in a statement.

In Damascus, thousands of pro-government protesters gathered at a mosque for the funeral of 11 policemen the government said died in the previous day's bombing. Opposition activists accused the government of making fake television footage of the aftermath of the bombing, pointing to three clips they said were "mistakenly" aired by Syrian state TV. One shows what seems to be an injured man on the ground standing up just before the end of the clip. Another shows a man with a microphone (allegedly a reporter for Syrian state TV) placing "bags of vegetables" in the street to give the impression that some of the victims were civilians shopping in the nearby market. The third video shows a person putting police shields in one of the damaged vans.

=== 8 January ===
More than a dozen people, including 11 soldiers, were killed in clashes between rebels and loyalists in Basr al-Harir, a town in southern Daraa Governorate, according to the SOHR. The LCC reported shelling and gunfire in Deir ez-Zor.

SANA reported that rebels fired at a police vehicle in the al-Khalidiyeh neighborhood of Homs, wounding 11 policemen. It also reported that another four policemen were wounded by gunfire near the National Hospital and that gunmen fired at a vehicle belonging to the Military Housing Establishment in Ashireh neighborhood, wounding the driver.

A chief police officer was stopped by gunmen while he was driving on the Harasta-Douma road. He was shot dead but his passenger was allowed to leave unharmed, SANA reported.

In Cairo, Arab foreign ministers met at the Arab League to discuss the monitoring mission in Syria and hear the first official report from Lieutenant General Mohamed Ahmed Mustafa al-Dabi, its leader. The Arab League decided to extend their mission after having heard the first rapports of their observers. They called for an end to the violence by both the Syrian government and opposition.

=== 9 January ===
Opposition activists said at least 21 people were killed in clashes throughout Syria. SOHR said most of the deaths were in the city of Homs and Idlib province.

=== 10 January ===
Opposition activists said that security forces killed at least 31 protesters, most of them in the cities of Deir al-Zour and Homs.

SANA reported that rebels fired at a vehicle carrying Syrian soldiers in Rif Dimashq. It said that three soldiers (including a colonel) were killed and three were wounded.

Syrian president Bashar al-Assad addressed a crowd at Damascus University in a speech. He said that he would remain in power because he felt he had the support of the people of Syria. He claimed that victory was near if Syrians had "courage". He blamed what he called "foreign conspiracies" for the unrest in Syria and said that restoring order can only be done by fighting "terrorists" with an iron fist. He denied that he gave orders to shoot protesters. He also announced that he plans a referendum in March for constitutional changes.

=== 11 January ===
Violence

Opposition activists reported that 28 people were killed across Syria by security forces, 13 of them in Homs.

A French reporter for the channel France 2 news was killed by a mortar shell or rocket while on a government organized trip to a pro-government rally. The reporter was killed when he went to check on an explosion near the local hospital, only to be hit by an additional mortar shell or rocket upon arriving there. Eight civilians were also killed in the attack.

SANA reported that a military bus was struck by a roadside bomb and then fired upon in Ya'four, Rif Dimashq. It said that four soldiers were killed and eight wounded.

Other events

A former Arab League observer to Syria decried the organization's monitoring mission a "farce". Anwar Malek, an Algerian Arab League observer who was part of the monitoring team, told Al Jazeera that he resigned because of what he saw, and said that the mission was falling apart. "What I saw was a humanitarian disaster. The regime is not just committing one war crime, but a series of crimes against its people," he said. "The snipers are everywhere shooting at civilians. People are being kidnapped. Prisoners are being tortured and none were released". He said that security forces did not withdraw their tanks from the streets, but just hid them and then redeployed them after the observers left. Malek also said "The regime didn't meet any of our requests, in fact they were trying to deceive us and steer us away from what was really happening, towards insignificant things". He said that those who were supposedly freed and were shown on TV, were actually people who had been randomly grabbed off the street. "They were detained for four or five days in tough conditions and later released as if they had been real prisoners". Malek also said that he had seen snipers on top of buildings: "On one, there were even army officers in front of the building, while snipers were on the roof. Some on our team preferred to maintain good relations with the regime and denied that there were snipers". He said that Assad's government "has gained a lot of time that has helped it implement its plan. Therefore I've decided to withdraw from this mission". The head of the Arab League observer mission, Sudanese Lieutenant-General Mohammed Al Dabi, distanced himself from Malek's claims, saying that Malek did not leave his hotel room because of illness. This was later denied by Malek, who said that he is shown on many videos taken by activists, as well as Syrian state TV coverage that showed him walking the streets of Homs. He also accused Dabi of ignoring his requests to talk to him about his reasons for resigning.

The Under-Secretary-General of the United Nations, Lynn Pascoe, said that, since the Arab League mission began, an estimated 400 people have been killed, an average of 40 a day, a rate much higher than before the mission began.

Israeli officials said that if Assad fell, Alawis might be forced to flee to the Israeli-occupied Golan Heights.

Tens of thousands turned out in a show of support for the government in Omeyad Square and were greeted by President Assad, who gave a short speech saying that his supporters would defeat what he called "a conspiracy against Syria".

The archbishop of Aleppo, Jean Clément Jeanbart, said that he was very worried that Christians would suffer as much as they did in Iraq if the regime fell. He said that he was in favor of giving Assad a chance and claimed that most Christians in Syria supported Assad.

=== 12 January ===
Opposition activists reported that security forces killed 18 people, mostly in Homs and Idlib.

SANA reported that eight policemen were killed in an attack on their bus near Jbala crossroads, 5 km north of Khan Sheikhoun.

Al Jazeera reported the defection of Sheikh Abdul Jalil al-Saeed, said to be public relations director for Grand Cleric Ahmad Hassoun. Hassoun denied that al-Saeed was ever employed by the state and asserted that no such position existed.

=== 13 January ===
Weekly Friday protests occurred, with tens of thousands protesting in Homs, Hama, Idlib, Aleppo and Damascus's suburbs. Protesters chanted in support of the Free Syrian Army as the Syrian National Council announced that it would begin to coordinate with the FSA. Opposition activists reported that security forces killed at least 13 people during the protests, including three children. They also reported that the Syrian Army entered the outskirts of Zabadani, a town 30 km outside Damascus, and cut its communications. It was claimed that tanks were bombarding Zabadani and the nearby town of Madaya, but that government forces were meeting resistance from the FSA.

SANA reported that three Syrian Army soldiers were killed and three wounded in a gun attack on a "Morse Code service center" in al-Mrah, Rif Dimashq. It also reported that two policemen were shot dead and 12 wounded in Wadi al-Saei'h neighborhood of Homs, while a soldier was shot dead in a gun attack on a Syrian Army recruitment office in the city.

=== 14 January ===
Opposition activists said that five civilians were killed by security forces throughout the country by noon.

SANA reported that a bomb planted on the railway between Mahmabil and Bishmaroun stations in Idlib derailed a train drawing 20 tankers loaded with 1000 tons of fuel. Some of the tankers caught fire and three of the train workers were injured. It also reported that saboteurs destroyed a high-voltage electricity pylon in Deir Ezzor desert.

The government of Qatar suggested that Arab League states should send in troops to end attack on civilians by Syrian government forces. An SNC official said Brigadier General Mostafa Ahmed al-Sheik, deputy commander of Syria's northern army, defected to Turkey two weeks prior.

=== 15 January ===
Syrian security forces shot dead 27 people on Sunday across the country, most of them in the city of Homs and the northwestern province of Idlib, the LCC reported. Meanwhile, 10,000 people marched in the town of Zabadani, in Damascus province, where an Arab observer team has been deployed, calling for regime change, according to the SOHR. Several thousand demonstrated in the Idlib town of Maaret al-Numan, calling for regime change and the trial of Bashar al-Assad when they met an observer team there.

SANA reported that a bus carrying workers of an Idlib textile factory was struck by a roadside bomb on the road between Ariha and al-Mastouma. It said that six were killed and 16 injured. SOHR reported that five were killed in the roadside blast near Ariha, while the LCC said that ten were killed "when pro-regime forces targeted their bus". SANA also reported that a 20 kg bomb was defused in an ambulance belonging to Homs National Hospital, and that four people were injured by mortars in Ekrima neighborhood.

After a student protest at Aleppo University, security officers raided the campus, The Daily Telegraph reported.

=== 16 January ===
Twelve people across the country were reportedly killed by Syrian security forces on 16 January.

SANA reported that five SA soldiers were killed and seven wounded in a rocket attack on a checkpoint near Sahnaya, Rif Dimashq. It also said that a brigadier general was shot dead in Ghotta, while a policeman and railway engineer were shot dead in Homs.

The regime appeared to suffer another high-profile military defection, with amateur video posted online showing a man dressed in the uniform of an army general displaying his identification card and declaring his support for the revolutionary movement at a rally festooned with pre-Ba'athist flags in Homs Governorate. A parliamentarian from Homs, Imad Ghalioun, gave an interview to Al Arabiya while visiting Cairo announcing that he was also defecting from the regime. He described Homs as "disaster-stricken" and said, "The Syrian people are living their worst period."

=== 17 January ===
According to the LCC, at least 30 people were killed by security forces; 18 of them in Homs. It said that the dead included two children and four SA defectors.

Both SANA and the LCC reported four people were killed and seven wounded when a roadside bomb struck a minibus on the Idlib–Saraqeb road. SANA blamed "terrorists" while the LCC blamed government forces. SANA also reported two policemen were shot dead outside Idlib Central Prison and the bodies of three soldiers and a civilian contractor were found with bullet wounds at a graveyard in Ariha.

In Zabadani, where a military assault was underway over the weekend, anti-government insurgents and army troops reportedly reached an agreement to mutually withdraw armed fighters from the city's streets. The ceasefire also halted the tank bombardment of Zabadani, an opposition leader claimed. He said the withdrawal of regime forces from the city was set to begin on 18 January.

=== 18 January ===
Anwar Malek, an Algerian ex-observer from the Arab League monitoring mission, said in an interview from his home in Paris that Syrian officials tried to intimidate him and other observers. He called for military aid to the rebels by the United States and other countries as the only way to resolve the conflict. A European Union spokesman said the supranational body was weighing new sanctions against the Syrian government. Reuters reported that Lebanese Druze politician Walid Jumblatt expressed concern during an interview in Beirut about a full-scale civil war in neighbouring Syria. Of Assad, Jumblatt said he was not listening to advice from former allies like Turkish Prime Minister Recep Tayyip Erdoğan, adding, "Up 'til now he has refused to listen to the rightful demands of the Syrian people for a new Syria."

The LCC said 21 people were killed by security forces during the day, including 13 in Homs. Meanwhile, SANA claimed 15 soldiers and policemen, including an army colonel, were killed in "recent" fighting.

=== 19 January ===
The military withdrew from Zabadani to positions 8 km away, residents said, upholding their end of a deal brokered between army and opposition representatives. The Arab League's observation mandate officially expired, but an official in Cairo said observers would remain in Syria until at least 22 January, when Arab League ministers would meet to determine whether or not to extend the duration of the mission. The Wall Street Journal reported that U.S. Treasury Department officials said they had proof that Iran was attempting to dodge an international embargo on exporting oil to Syria. An unnamed Iranian official quoted in the article insisted that Tehran is not bound to comply with the embargo or any sanctions against Syria. Leading Kurdish opposition figures said anti-government Kurdish activists and political dissents planned to unite and present their vision for a post-Assad Syria to Arab opposition members, citing distrust that Arabs would allow Kurdish autonomy in northeastern Syria if the government fell. Sources reported as many as 25 were killed in Syria throughout the day, Al Arabiya said.

=== 20 January ===
Weekly Friday protests occurred, with the largest protests occurring in Idlib, Aleppo, Damascus, and Homs. Other protests occurred in Daraa, Deir Ezzor, Zabadani, Hama, and Latakia. Security forces prevented worshippers attending the Omari mosque in the southern town of Deraa. A security officer who had defected, was assassinated in Deraa, the Syrian Observatory for Human Rights said. Activists said at least 12 people were killed on Friday, including seven in Idlib.

French daily Le Figaro reported that FSA members mistakenly killed the French journalist Gilles Jacquier by firing a mortar round into a Syrian Army-controlled neighborhood of Homs, citing interviews with rebel leaders. The Free Syrian Army denied responsibility.

Ahmad el-Tayyeb, the grand imam of Cairo's Al-Azhar, the highest seat of Sunni Muslim learning, urged "Arab rulers to take the necessary measures to halt bloodshed in Syria", the state news agency MENA quoted him as saying on Friday. NATO's most senior officer said on Thursday that the alliance was not planning or even "thinking" of intervening in Syria. Burhan Ghalioun, the leader of the opposition Syrian National Council, also headed to Cairo to lobby the Arab ministers to refer the observer mission's findings to the United Nations Security Council for tough action.

SANA reported that the chief warrant officer of Daraa was killed after being abducted by the FSA.

As many as 19 people were killed by shooting from Syrian security forces on Friday, Al Arabiya reported, citing Syrian activists.

=== 21 January ===
According to the Local Coordination Committees, 60 unidentified corpses were found in the morgue of the hospital in Idlib. The corpses reportedly had signs of torture. The LCC said that security forces opened fire inside and outside the hospital as activists and residents found the bodies. A mass arrest campaign was reportedly underway in the area. Including the corpses in Idlib, the death toll for the day reportedly reached a total of 94 people, including 14 prisoners on a bus in Idlib, two people shot dead by security forces in Douma, one in Deir Ezzor, and three in Homs.

SANA reported that police vehicles were attacked with explosives at al-Mastouma. One of the vehicles was allegedly transporting prisoners. It said that 14 people were killed while 26 prisoners and at least six police were wounded. SANA also reported that security forces clashed with gunmen trying to enter Syria from Lebanon, near al-Msherfeh village. Three gunmen were reportedly killed.

The London-based Syrian Observatory for Human Rights said that the FSA had temporarily seized parts of the town of Douma, near Damascus, during the night. Local activists reported that the FSA built barricades and occupied the streets but eventually withdrew to their hideouts, "most likely because it could offer the regime an excuse to storm the area". However, the LCC denied that the FSA took control of Douma.

The United States announced it was preparing to shut down its embassy in Syria.

=== 22 January ===
The Arab League held a meeting at which the representative of Saudi Arabia announced the kingdom would withdraw its funding and personnel from the observer mission, saying it had failed. The League also drafted a plan calling for Assad to relinquish power to Vice President Farouk al-Sharaa and form a national unity government modeled off that of the Republic of Yemen, to include opposition leaders and establish an independent commission of inquiry into the uprising and crackdown, similar to the Bahrain Independent Commission of Inquiry established to investigate the uprising in Bahrain, as well as reorganize the security forces with international assistance and prepare for free and fair parliamentary elections within three months of its formation. In the United States, Senators Charles Schumer and Kirsten Gillibrand introduced new legislation in the United States Senate to increase pressure on the Syrian government with further sanctions. Qatari Foreign Minister Hamad bin Jassim al-Thani said the Arab League planned to ask the UN Security Council to endorse the initiative.

After the body of a 14-year-old Lebanese boy killed the day before by security forces who stormed a fishing boat in Mediterranean waters disputed between Beirut and Damascus was returned to his family, mourners threw stones at Syrian soldiers along the international border, calling Assad "the enemy of God". According to news reports, the soldiers did not retaliate, and the mourners eventually dispersed. One of the boy's two uncles seized in the attack on the boat said after his release that he had been interrogated and beaten in custody on suspicion of being an arms smuggler.

Two Swiss journalists who were colleagues of Gilles Jacquier, the French reporter killed in Homs days earlier, said they blamed Syrian authorities for Jacquier's death. They claimed there were indications the "ambush" may have been planned in advance.

In Talfita, a village outside Damascus, three members of the SA, one anti-government militant and two civilians were killed in clashes, the SOHR claimed. Citing opposition sources in Douma, Reuters reported that the FSA was said to be in control of about two-thirds of the town's main streets, with off-and-on fighting continuing.

=== 23 January ===
At least 22 civilians, five security forces and an SA defector were killed on 23 January, activists said. The LCC said security forces killed 23 people including two children, a rebel soldier and two who died under torture. It said that five people were killed in Daraa, six in Homs, eight in Idlib, two in Damascus, two in Hama, one in the north-western province of al-Hasakeh and another in Deir al-Zour.

SANA reported that 11 people were killed and three wounded when a bus was attacked with RPGs and gunfire in the Ashira neighborhood of Homs. An attack on two other minibuses at Homs Military Hospital reportedly killed a civil employee. SANA also reported a brigadier general and first lieutenant were shot dead in Talfita, two policemen and a civil employee were shot dead on the Souran-Hama road, while a policeman was killed by a bomb in Atman.

The head of Arab League observers, Sudanese General Dabi, rejected criticism of his team's work and said that the mission had reduced the bloodshed in Syria. He also said that in some regions, the FSA attacked security forces, prompting them to return fire.

Syria rejected the previous day's Arab League resolution calling on the Syrian government to quit violence and establish a national unity government, calling it a "foreign conspiracy" that threatened Syria's "sovereignty".

=== 24 January ===
Local Coordination Committees reported that the number of Syrian deaths on 24 January rose to 52, 39 of which were in Homs, including 18 deaths from the Syrian army's artillery shelling of two buildings in Bab Tadmur neighborhood. Also 5 were killed in Hama, 3 in Daraa and 2 in Idlib, and one death each in Damascus, Douma in Damascus's Suburbs, and Raqqa.

=== 25 January ===
The Local Coordinating Committees in Syria stated that the number of those killed on 25 January had risen to 24, among them 6 soldiers from the Free Syrian Army, 2 children, and 2 women. In addition, 5 were killed in Damascus Suburbs, 4 in each of Homs and Hama, 3 in Idlib, 1 in Aleppo, and 1 in Daraa. The secretary general of the Syrian Red Crescent, a non-profit medical service, was shot dead in Idlib. The Red Crescent commented that his was not the first time they were attacked, and that security forces had shot at them before.

=== 26 January ===
The Arab League chief has reportedly said that a peace plan that aims to end Syria's political crisis will be submitted to the United Nations Security Council early next week. Nabil Elaraby, the secretary-general of the Arab League, told reporters in Cairo that the meeting with UN officials will be held on Monday in New York City.

Syrian state television reported that tens of thousands of Assad supporters showed their support in a rally held in Damascus. Various other pro Assad rallies happened across Syria.

At least 34 civilians, including ten children, were killed by security forces in Syria, according to Syrian Observatory of Human Rights. In addition, seven or eight army deserters were killed Thursday in clashes, including a colonel in Homs, where government forces launched an offensive on Thursday night at the district of Karm al-Zeitoun, killing 26 civilians, including nine children, and leaving dozens injured.

In the city of Hama, where the Syrian army launched a major offensive Tuesday, four civilians were killed including a woman, 58 years old, who was shot dead by snipers, the source said. One was killed in the province of Idleb, and two more in the suburbs of Damascus. In the province of Deraa, a teenager was killed and three others injured.

By evening, the Local Coordination Committees in Syria reported that the death toll of civilians on 26 January reached 42. In addition to the 42 killed, the LCC reported that 23 corpses were later found in the Bab Qebli section of Hama. The corpses were handcuffed and shown signs of torture.

The centre of Douma, on the outskirts of Damascus, was under the control of the Free Syrian Army during the night, with checkpoints set up on the outskirts and there were reports of gunfire and explosions in some areas.

=== 27 January ===
Opposition activists alleged 102 people were shot dead by Syrian security force across Syria, as Friday protests spread. The casualties included both protesters as well as defected soldiers. The death toll of 102 included the 23 corpses found overnight in Homs.

Anti-government protests occurred primarily in Aleppo, Idlib, Latakia, Daraa, and the Damascus suburbs. The cities of Hama and Homs also experienced mass protests, but were primarily under siege by the Syrian army. Since 23 January, both Hama and Homs have been under intensive siege and occupation by the Syrian army, which wishes to take back neighborhoods in Hama and Homs recently controlled by the Free Syrian Army. Over the past week intensive clashes between the Free Syrian Army and the government's forces led to the FSA's takeover of large proportions of Homs, Hama, and suburban Damascus, prompting retaliatory attacks by the Syrian army, which additionally led to dozens of civilian casualties. the majority of Friday's casualties were in Homs.

Gen. Mustafa al-Dabi warned of an escalation of the conflict in recent days.

The FSA announced that the group had captured around 7 Iranian men, 5 of whom were alleged to be Revolutionary Guard members participating in the government crackdown (two others were civilians). A video was posted displaying the men and their alleged Iranian military identity cards, it was too blurry to read the cards, and shows one man, named Haidar Ali, pleading to Ali Khamenei to withdraw all Iranian military personnel from Syria. The FSA stated its intention to hold the men hostage until military operations against Homs cease and FSA member Lieutenant Colonel Hussein Harmoush is freed. Iran denied that they were soldiers, and instead said that they were the engineers who had been kidnapped in the previous weeks.

Defected Col. Hammoud estimated the FSA had gained control about 90% of the northern city of Idlib and just over half of Homs.

=== 28 January ===
Local Coordination Committees of Syria reported number of 28 January's deaths rose to 50, among them three 3 children and one 1 woman., 19 people were killed in Homs, 6 in Hama, 7 in Damascus Suburbs (Saqba, Douma, Moadamieh, Arbeen, Zamalka, Baseemeh), 3 in Daraa, 2 each in Deir Ezzor and Idlib, and 1 in each of Damascus and Qonaitra, additional to 10 casualties of the defected soldiers. Deaths in Rankous and Ghouta were also reported, but the number is not yet known.

The Arab league decided to suspend for the moment its mission because of the spike of violence in the recent days in the country. The secretary general also asked the head of the mission to ensure the security of observers. At the same time interior minister Mohamed Shaar said that Syria will continue to try to "cleanse" Syria of what he named outlaws.

By night, the LCC reported that the death toll for 28 January reached 98 people, including 20 unidentified corpses found in Hama's city hospital.

=== 29 January ===
An estimated 2,000 troops backed by tanks attempted to retake rebellious Damascus suburbs, with a similar situation occurring in the mountain town of Rankous to the north. At least 19 people were reported killed, including fourteen civilians and five rebels during the government crackdown on the Damascus suburbs of Kfar Batna, Saqba, Jisreen and Arbeen in what locals described as "urban warfare."

The LCC reported one of the bloodiest days of the uprising, with 62 people claimed dead across Syria. Of the dead, 19 were in Homs, 16 were in and around Damascus, and 15 were in Hama, the LCC said. At least 50 were injured by government forces' shelling of Damascus' eastern suburb of Ghotta, the LCC claimed. The Syrian Observatory for Human Rights said a roadside bomb destroyed a military vehicle near Idlib, killing 10 soldiers. It also reported a rebel soldier was killed near Zabadani. SANA said another roadside bomb near Damascus killed six soldiers and wounded six more. Meanwhile, Russian Foreign Minister Sergei Lavrov, said that he did not agree with the Arab League's decision to suspend its observing mission in Syria, claiming it had reduced violence and was a "useful instrument" in gauging the situation in the country. Secretary-General Ban Ki-moon, head of the United Nations, called for an end to the violence in Syria and said it was the government's responsibility to end the bloodshed.

After two days of clashes, oppositions and FSA sources confirmed that the Syrian army seized back the control of the eastern suburbs of Damascus from the rebels and started to make house to house arrests. SANA said 51 soldiers were killed in recent days of fighting.

Opposition activists claimed that close family members of Assad, including his wife, had tried to leave Damascus via plane, but had been intercepted by the Free Syrian Army and forced to return to government held areas of Damascus. The government refused to comment on the rumor.

=== 30 January ===
On 30 January, the Syrian Army continued its offensive on previously rebel held area around Damascus. After seizing back the eastern suburbs the previous day, the army entered the city of Rankous after several days of clashes forcing the rebels to retreat and withdraw, according to the London-based Syrian Observatory for Human Rights.

On the night of 30 January, the fighting subsided as Syrian army extended their control in Ghouta. An activist said that the FSA moved out of the suburbs and that the Syrian army arrested 200 opposition members in Hammourya. The opposition death toll in Damascus given by the activist was 19 civilians killed and 6 FSA soldiers killed.

The Free Syrian Army returned to Saqba, and began conducting hit and run attacks against the Syrian army.

Local Coordination Committees in Syria reported the number of people killed by the Syrian army on 30 January reached 100, including 8 children and a woman. 56 of the deaths were in Homs, 20 in Rastan, 15 in Daraa, 6 in Damascus suburbs, 1 in Hasakah, and 2 in Idlib.

Despite the prior demand from the FSA, an official from the Syrian League for Human Rights claimed to AFP that FSA colonel Hussein Harmush was executed by a gunshot wound to the head by an Air Force intelligence unit. In June 2011, Harmush was the first military officer to defect from the Assad government, doing so by communicating such to AFP in the Turkish town of Guvecci. He was later allegedly captured by intelligence from a refugee camp and forced to confess to various "crimes," with the confessions broadcast on state television.

=== 31 January ===
The Syrian Ministry of Interior issued a statement announcing that Assad's security forces had killed a number of suspected "terrorists" and arrested several others in Douma, Harasta, Saqba, Hammouriyeh and Kfar Batna, seizing a large stockpile of weapons.

The Syrian army continued its assault in the Damascus region with troops and tanks moving on Arbeen and Zamalka. On another note, an activist claimed that the opposition fighters had captured the city of Rastan after a day of fighting with government forces. Further clashes occurred in Rastan, according to certain activists, who witnessed the destruction of an unidentified structure by a tank.

Local coordination committees reported that the number of those killed on 31 January have reached 34, including two children, a woman and 5 army defectors, 4 of whom were executed in Idlib. 14 were believed killed in Idlib, 12 in Homs, and at least 3 in the Damascus Suburbs.

== February 2012 ==
=== 1 February ===
While the army continued their operations, the Russian ambassador at the UN stated that Russia would veto the proposed resolution if a clause explicitly excluding any military intervention was not included. Eleven Iranian pilgrims were allegedly kidnapped in Syria, and Iranian authorities accused armed opposition groups of being responsible.

The number of those killed by Syrian security forces on 1 February has risen to 70 so far including 14 deaths from the Free Syrian Army, 2 women and 2 children. 35 were killed in Wadi Barada (Damascus suburbs), 8 in Daraa, 14 in Homs, 6 in Eastern Gharba (Daraa suburbs), 3 in Damascus suburbs (Arbeen and Moadamiya), 3 in Idlib and one in Qamishli.

=== 2 February ===
Heavy gunfire and shelling were reported to have occurred in Wadi Barada outside Damascus. Twenty four people, including six army defectors were killed in the fighting according to activists.

At the United Nations, talks were progressing toward a consensus. The text in Syrian resolutions being drafted have been watered down in an attempt to dodge a Russian veto and do not explicitly call for Assad to step down although the UN reaffirms its support for Arab League proposals. The new drafts also rule out foreign military intervention. However, Russia continued to voice its disapproval.

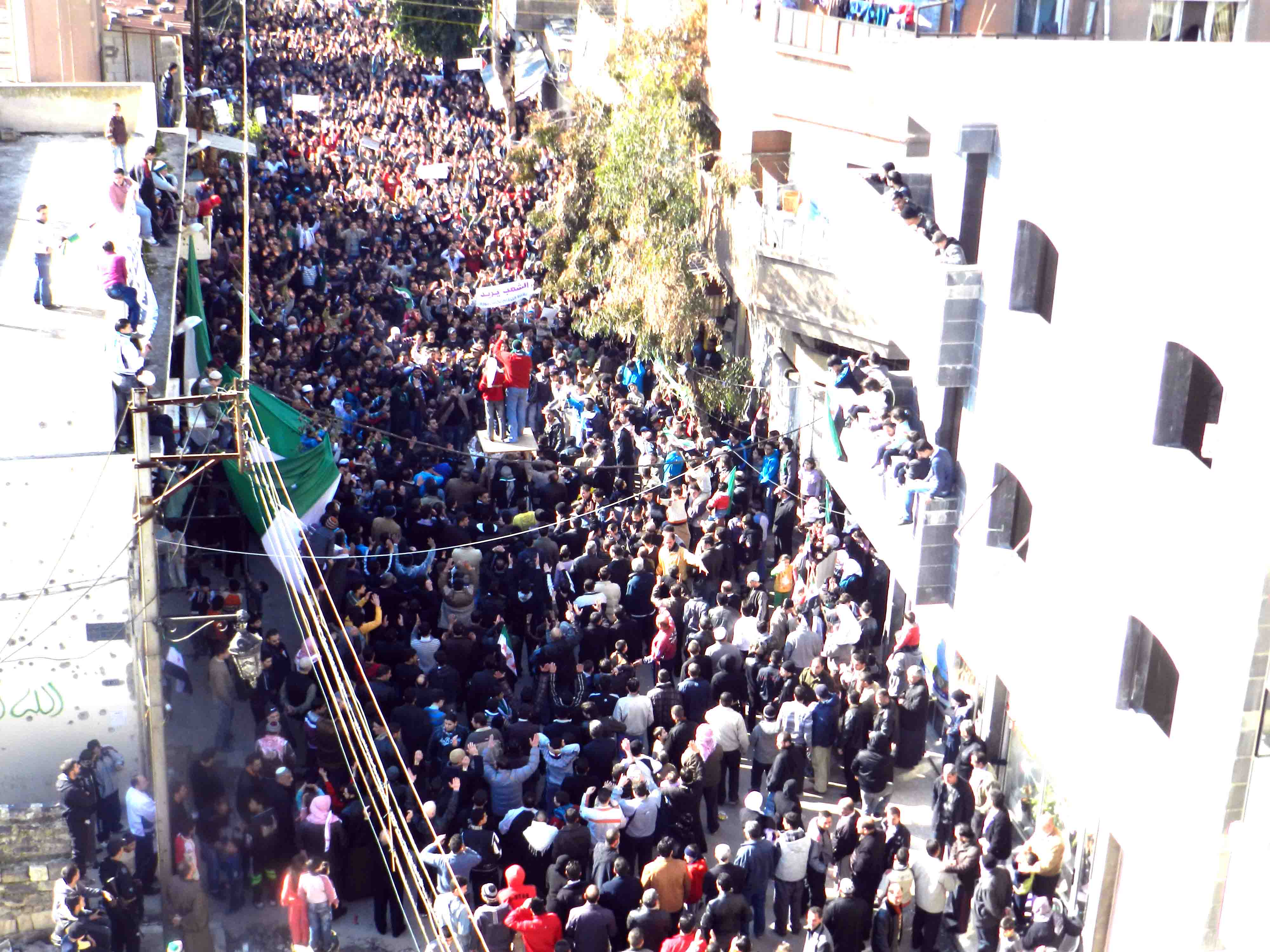
Big demonstration in one of Homs districts

=== 3 February ===
Protesters across Syria rallied in memorial of the 1982 Hama massacre. The largest protests occurred within Homs, Aleppo, and Idlib. Protesters attempted to rally in Hama, but were dispersed by security forces stationed to preempt mass protesting in Hama. Other protests occurred in Daraa and Latakia. Protests in Damascus's suburbs were fired upon and dispersed the Syrian army stationed there. 42 protesters and civilians across Syria were reported killed by security forces. Opposition troops assaulted Syrian army positions in Anadan, just outside Aleppo. Demonstrations in Syria on 3 February were seemingly amongst the most widespread of the entire uprising, including protests in over 600 towns and neighborhoods.

=== 4 February ===
Government forces began an intense artillery bombardment of Homs, leading to over 400 civilian deaths, according to activists in the city. Shabiha invaded some hospitals as well, with intent to kill or abduct the wounded. Syria strongly denied that such a shelling happened. They said that it was a fabrication from the opposition to try to influence the vote at the UN the same day and accused the armed groups in Homs of killing soldiers and civilians. However, activists posted web videos which display burning structures believed to be hit by Syrian artillery. The authenticity of these films have not been verified.

The Lebanese army deployed into the northern towns of Wadi Khaled and Akroum to root out possible Syrian opposition forces and gunrunners.

A mass funeral was held in Khalidya, Homs, for those who lost their lives in the neighborhood during the night. Elsewhere in Daraya, Damascus, a second funeral was attacked by security forces, who reportedly shot 12 mourners.

Russia and China announced their veto to the contemporary UN resolution on Syria at the security council.

=== 5 February ===
The Local Coordination Committees said the number of those killed by security forces on 5 February had risen to 43, including 6 children and 3 women; of which, 29 of the deaths were in Homs, 6 in Idlib, 5 in Damascus Suburbs, 2 in Daraa and 1 in Aleppo.

=== 6 February ===
At least 300 rockets were reported to have landed in the city of Homs, with at least 15 initially reported killed on Monday morning. Great Britain recalled their ambassador. A pipeline was damaged in the city of Homs. The United States had announced that they were closing their embassy. The United Kingdom has also summoned its ambassador to the Foreign Office, and has suspended services in Syria.

United States sent an official to Russia to talk about sanctions against Syria and Iran. Russia foreign minister Lavrov said western reactions to the Russian veto were too "hysterical".

Canada said that contrary to the United States, they decided to keep their embassy open.

The Local Coordinating Committees stated the number of those killed by security forces on 6 February has risen to 74, among them 4 children and 4 women: 47 deaths were in Homs, 12 in the Damascus Suburbs (Zabadany, Saqba, Madaya. Hazza, Daraya), 9 in Idlib, 3 in Damascus (Kafar Souseh, Dummar City), 2 in Aleppo, and 1 in Qalaat al-Madiq in Hama.

=== 7 February ===
Russian FM Lavrov made his visit to Syria. Russia wants a solution based on the Arab League plan. Gulf Arab states, Kuwait, Saudi Arabia, Bahrain, Qatar, Oman and the United Arab Emirates joined countries pulling ambassadors from Syria. These countries are also asking Syria to recall its ambassadors. Unicef says more 400 children have died during the past 11 months in Syria. Unicef also demands Syrian officials to let in aid for the victims of the conflict.

Local Coordination Committees in Syria stated that number of those killed by security forces in Syria on 7 February was 35 including two women and 6 children, including a mother and her three children. 19 were killed in Homs, 10 in Madaya (Damascus suburbs), 2 in Idlib, 2 in Daraa and 2 in Aleppo.

=== 8 February ===
The Syrian army launched an intense bombardment of Homs with artillery shelling, primarily on the Bab Amr neighborhood, reportedly killing 43 civilians.

By night, the civilian death toll from the Syrian army's assault on Homs reached 117.

The same day, 43 Syrian soldiers and security forces were buried, according to Syrian press agency SANA.

=== 9 February ===
110 civilians were killed in Homs by artillery shelling from the government's army on 9 February.

137 civilians were reported killed in total throughout Syria on 9 February.

Syrian press agency reported that 8 Syrian Army soldiers and policemen were buried after dying in engagements in Homs, the Damascus countryside, and Idleb.

=== 10 February ===
Two explosions rocked Aleppo, targeting a security building and the Military Intelligence Directorate in the city, the state TV reported. At least 25 people were killed and 175 were injured in the blasts. Defected General Aref Hamoud, a FSA member, told Al Jazeera reporter Rula Amin that the FSA carried out an attack with RPGs and Mortars, while later other FSA leaders denied it and accused the government of manipulation, claiming that bombing the attacking security headquarters would be too difficult given the number of checkpoints in the surrounding area.

The Syrian army massed outside of Homs preparing another offensive, as activists reported food and medical supplies had become scarce.

Mass protests occurred throughout Syria, with the largest occurring in Aleppo, Hama, and Idlib. Other protests occurred in Daraa, Damascus and its suburbs, Deir Ezzor, Latakia, and neighborhoods in Homs that were not besieged.

A fire fight broke out in the Lebanese city of Tripoli between armed supporters and opponents of Syria's president Assad. The violence broke out between Sunni and Alawite sects after an anti-Assad protest. RPGs and assault rifles were reportedly used in the clash that led to at least two soldiers and four civilians being wounded. The casualties later increased to three killed and twenty three wounded, including ten soldiers of the Lebanese Army.

The Local Coordination Committees in Syria said the number of those killed by security forces on Friday has reached 51, including five children and three women. 13 were killed in Aleppo, 11 in Homs, 8 in Domair in Damascus suburbs, 5 in Daraa, 1 in Hama, and 1 in Deir Ezzor.

=== 11 February ===
Government forces resumed shelling Homs, leading to at least seven deaths during the morning.

The Iraqi interior minister said that armed jihadists were crossing the Syrian border to take part in the armed rebellion.

40 Syrian Army soldiers and policemen were buried after dying in fighting in Homs and Damascus, the Syrian press Agency SANA reported. Among the dead is Army Brigadier General Dr. Issa al-Kholi, who was assassinated outside his home in Rukin Eddin, Damascus.

The Local Coordination Committees said the number of those killed by security forces on Saturday has risen to 30, including 2 women and a child. 13 were killed in Daraa (Msaifra, Tseel, Deir Bekheit, and Daeel), 12 in Homs, 2 in each of Maaret Al-Nouman in Idlib and Rankous in Damascus Suburbs, and 1 in Damascus proper.

=== 12 February ===
The leader of Al Qaeda, Ayman al-Zawahiri, released a video where he urged all Muslims to support the Syrian rebels. American officials blamed Al Qaeda elements for the suicide bombings which happened in Damascus in December. The Jordanian affiliate of the Muslim Brotherhood called for a jihad against Assad and said Muslims should give support to the rebels.

Ministers from the Arab League, which suspended Syria's membership in response to the crackdown, met in Cairo on Sunday to discuss forming a joint UN-Arab League monitoring team in place of a league observer mission that was suspended last month. Sources told Al Jazeera that the league is going to form a new mission of about 3,000 observers that has an international character, under the supervision of the Arab League.

Sudanese General Mustafa al-Dabi resigned from the observer mission.

The Arab League passed a resolution pledging to ask the United Nations to form a joint peacekeeping force in Syria. The resolution also called for "opening communication channels with the Syrian opposition and providing all forms of political and material support to it". It also urged the Syrian opposition to unite. The resolution said violence against civilians in Syria had violated international law and "perpetrators deserve punishment". The resolution reaffirmed a call for Arabs to impose economic sanctions on Syria and decided on ending diplomatic cooperation with Damascus. Syria's ally Lebanon, which was outvoted at the summit, rejected the statement.

Syrian government officials said that they completely rejected the Arab League resolution.

Opposition forces within the city of Idlib were under preparations for the "inevitable attack" by Syrian Army troops.

Activists reported 23 were killed by security across Syria, primarily in Homs and Daraa.

=== 13 February ===
Syrian opposition groups rejected any interference by al-Qaida in their uprising. "We categorically reject these statements and any attempts by the al-Qaida network to interfere in our revolution," the General Commission of the Syrian Revolution said. We are a people struggling for freedom and dignity and for a democratic state," it added.

Local Coordination Committees in Syria said the number of those killed by security forces on 13 February had reached 30, including 4 children and a defected soldier. 9 were killed in Idlib, 4 in the Damascus suburbs, 11 in Homs, and 3 in Daraa, 2 in Aleppo, and 1 in Hama.

=== 14 February ===
Local Coordination Committees said the number of those killed by security forces on 14 February has risen to 49, including 3 defected soldiers (Damascus Suburbs) and 3 women. 11 were killed in Idlib, 9 in Homs, 4 in Daraa, 10 in Aleppo, 4 in Deir Ezzor, 3 in Hama, 6 in Damascus Suburbs, 1 in Lattakia, and 1 in Damascus.

=== 15 February ===
The Syrian government says that a referendum for a "new constitution" will be held on 26 February.

The Syrian government began "deliberately jamming" Al Arabiya's broadcast in Syria.

The number of those killed by security forces in Syria on 15 February has risen to 32, among them 3 children, 1 woman and one defected soldier. 12 were killed in Idlib, 5 in Damascus Suburbs (Bloudan, Douma, Harasta), 4 were killed in Homs, 3 in Daraa, 3 in Hama, 2 in Hasakeh, and 1 in each of Lattakia, Damascus and Aleppo.

The Syrian Revolution General Commission reported that by the end of the day, 54 people have been killed by security force gunfire across Syria on Wednesday, with most of the deaths in Idlib and Homs.

=== 16 February ===
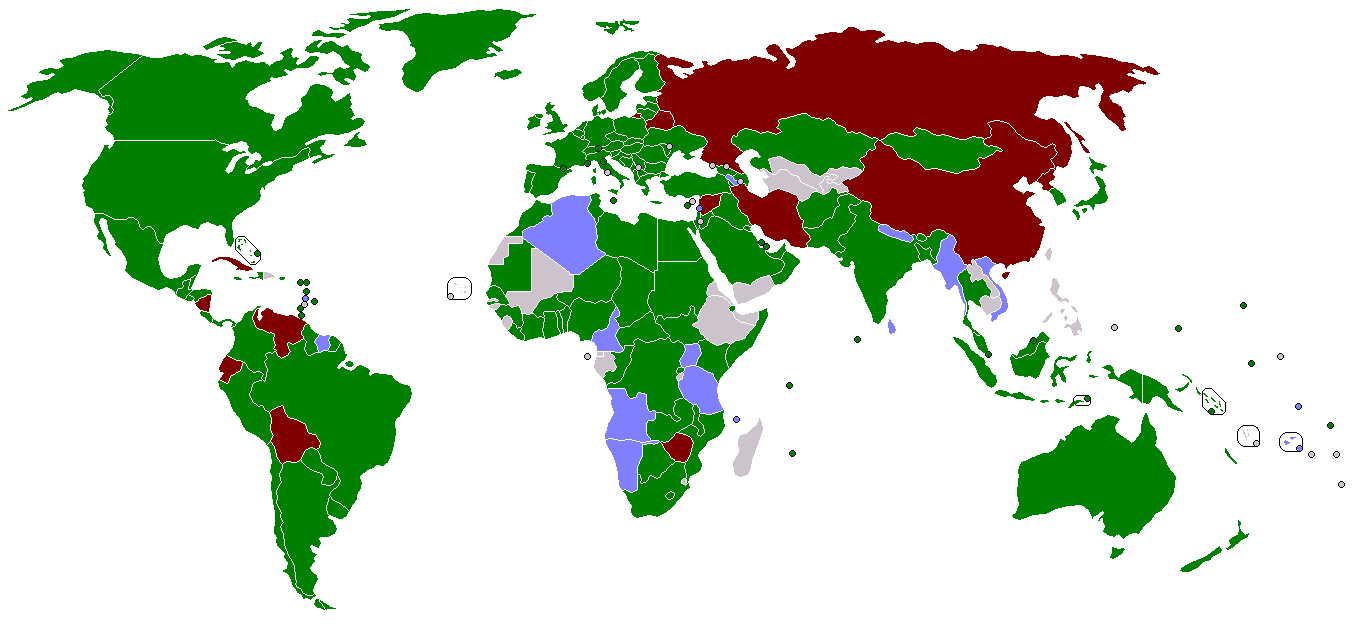
UNGA Resolution A/RES/66/253 A (see also A/RES/66/253 B) for against abstain

Ban-ki Moon, the UN Secretary-General, said that crimes against humanity had been carried out by government forces, saying "We see neighbourhoods shelled indiscriminately, hospitals used as torture centres, children as young as 10 years old killed and abused. We see almost a certain crimes against humanity," Ban said during a visit to Austria.

The Local Coordination Committees in Syria said the number of those killed by security forces on 16 February reached 70 thus far, including 36 unidentified bodies, 13 soldiers, 3 woman and 2 pre-term infants. 38 were killed in Idlib, 12 in Hama, 5 in Homs, 6 in Damascus Suburbs "Zabadany, Madaya", 7 in Daraa, and 1 in Deir Ezzor and 1 in Raqqah.

The United Nations General Assembly approved a non-binding resolution with 137 YES votes, 12 NO votes and 17 abstentions. The resolution called for the resignation of Bashar al Assad and a halt to the violence in the country.

=== 17 February ===
The number of those killed by security forces on 17 February has risen to 39, including 12 defected soldiers executed on the site in Jassem. 15 civilians were killed in Daraa (Jassem, Hara), 4 in Homs, 5 in Mezze (Damascus), 3 in Deir Ezzor, 3 in Aleppo, 3 in Hama, and 3 in Damascus Suburbs (Yabrood, Douma).

By the end of the day, the death toll had risen to 56 killed.

Mass protests occurred across Syria, primarily in Damascus, Aleppo, Hama, Daraa, and Idlib.

The Syrian opposition warned that the Syrian army was preparing for a massive assault on Bab Amr, Homs, and that the Syrian army was prepared to "annihilate everyone".

US defence officials told a US network that "a good number" of unmanned US military and intelligence drones are operating in the skies over Syria to monitor Assad's government forces attacks against civilians and armed opposition.

"The officials said this surveillance is not in preparation for US military intervention," NBC News reported.

Reuters news agency has reported that two Iranian naval ships have sailed through Egypt's Suez Canal into the Mediterranean, in a move likely to be keenly watching by Israel. "Two Iranian ships crossed through the Suez Canal following permission from the Egyptian armed forces," a source in the canal authority said. The destroyer and a supply ship could be on their way to the Syrian coast, the source added. Iran and Syria agreed to cooperate on naval training a year ago, and Tehran has no naval agreement with any other country in the region.

US Secretary of State Hillary Clinton said Friday that the UN General Assembly has shown an "overwhelming international consensus" to demand the Syrian regime end its bloody crackdown. The vote "demonstrated an overwhelming international consensus that the bloody assaults must end," Clinton said at a press conference with EU Foreign Policy Chief Cathy Ashton. "In the face of this global condemnation the regime in Damascus, however, appears to be escalating its assaults on civilians, and those who are suffering cannot get access to the humanitarian assistance they need and deserve," she said. "So we will keep working to pressure and isolate the regime, to support the opposition and to provide relief to the people of Syria."

=== 18 February ===
21 People were killed across Syria by gunfire from security forces. 15,000 Anti-government protesters assembled in Mezzeh, Damascus 2 kilometres southwest from Umayyad square, Damascus. The protest was significant as it was the largest single anti-Assad protest in central Damascus to date. Security forces fired on the protest in Mezzeh, killing at least one person.

=== 19 February ===
Iranian state media reported that Iranian warships have crossed the Suez Canal and docked in Syria's port city of Tartous. Egypt calls home envoy from Syria. Gunmen in Syria staged a guerrilla-style ambush that killed a senior state prosecutor and a judge Sunday in an attack that suggested armed factions are growing bolder and more coordinated in their uprising against Assad's regime.

23 people were killed by security forces in Idlib and Homs, and 11 were killed in the town of Atareb in the Aleppo province when the Syrian army stormed the town. Communications and water were shut off in Atareb.

=== 20 February ===
Local Coordination Committees in Syria said the number of killed by security forces on Monday has risen to 18 martyrs. 13 were killed in Homs, 2 in Hama, and 1 in each of Hassakeh, Idlib, and Douma in Damascus Suburbs.

30 soldiers, as well as an officer and a tank defected to the Free Syrian Army in the town of al-Qusayr.

=== 21 February ===
There were reports that many people had been killed in renewed heavy shelling of the Baba Amr neighbourhood of Homs following a buildup of forces the day before. Syrian tanks and troop have massed outside Homs for a possible ground assault, which Rami Abdul-Rahman, head of the British-based Syrian Observatory for Human Rights, warned would lead to a huge loss of life just as the Red Cross was attempting to broker a cease-fire to allow humanitarian aid in. Two Iranian naval ships returned from Syria through the Suez Canal on Tuesday. Iran says the real reason behind sending warships is that they will train the Syrian navy.

By the end of the day, the number of those killed by security forces on Tuesday has reached 106, including 10 children, 3 women, 3 defected recruits: 45 were killed by artillery shelling in Homs, 55 in Idlib, two in Douma and Mesraba in Damascus Suburbs, 2 in Deir Ezzor, and one in Aleppo.

=== 22 February ===
Sunday Times journalist Marie Colvin along with photographer Remi Ochlik were killed in Homs by the Syrian army's artillery bombardment on the Bab Amr neighborhood.

At least 92 people have been killed across Syria after security force shelling intensified in the rebel-held Baba Amr district in the city of Homs, the Syrian General Revolutionary Council said.

=== 23 February ===
88 people have been killed by Syrian army across Syria on Thursday, primarily in the cities of Homs, Idlib, and Hama.

By the end of the day the LCC reported that 101 civilians were killed by Syrian army forces throughout Syria, with 47 killed in Idlib alone. Former UN secretary general Kofi Annan appointed joint UN-Arab League special envoy to Syria.

=== 24 February ===
The Friends of Syria meeting took place in Tunis, where 70 Western and Arab Nations gathered to discuss and act on the ongoing events in Syria.

The Friends of Syria meeting announced the recognition of the SNC as the "legitimate representative of the Syrian people", a step below recognition as the sole legitimate government, and requested that any other opposition groups in Syria rally behind the SNC. The meeting also called for the UN and Arab league to establish a peacekeeping force on the ground in Syria. The meeting called for tougher sanctions, as the European union announced that they would freeze Syria's assets within their country. The Tunisian president proposed in addition that the Syrian conflict be resolved with an amnesty deal for Bashar Assad, where Bashar Assad would resign take leave in Russia. The Saudi Arabian foreign minister left the meeting, claiming that the Friends of Syria did not go far enough to try to solve the crisis, and further exclaimed that the Free Syrian Army should be armed and supported to out-right topple the regime.

The leaders of Hamas announced that they were completely abandoning support for the Syrian government, and announced their support for the armed rebellion.

The Free Syrian Army announced that they had received their first supply of light arms and communication equipment from the Persian Gulf region and neighboring countries, purchased by Syrian exiles, but emphasized that it was only a limited number of light weaponry that they received.

Mass Friday anti-government protests occurred in Syria, with the largest gatherings in Aleppo, Idlib, Daraa, Qamishli and the Damascus suburbs. Activists reported that 50 people were killed on Friday by security forces, primarily in Homs, Aleppo, Hama and Qamishli.

By the end of the day the LCC reported that 103 had been killed by the Syrian army, primarily in Homs and Hama.

=== 25 February ===
Over 100 people were killed by the Syrian army across Syria, primarily in Homs, Hama, and Idlib.

=== 26 February ===
At least 31 Syrian civilians and soldiers were killed on Sunday in bloodshed that coincided with a vote on a new constitution that could keep President Bashar al-Assad in power until 2028, Assad says the referendum shows his commitment to democratic reform while Western powers and Syrians involved in an 11-month-old revolt against his rule have described it as a farce.

By the end of the day, the death toll reached 65, primarily in Homs.

Tens of thousands of people have marched in Morocco to demand an end to the Syrian regime's brutal crackdown on dissenters and to call for international intervention in the crisis. The MAP news agency says Syrians residing in Morocco were among the marchers Sunday in Casablanca. The demonstrators carried Moroccan and Syrian flags as well as signs calling on embattled Syrian President Bashar Assad to stop killing those seeking his ouster.

=== 27 February ===
The European Union has agreed new sanctions against Syria.

Activists reported that 68 civilians in Homs were summarily executed in a massacre when security forces arrested them as they tried to flee the neighborhood of Baba Amr.

By the end of the day the death toll had risen to 125, including from artillery shelling and the massacre in Homs, with rest of the deaths having occurred in Hama, Aleppo province, and Idlib.

=== 28 February ===
The number of civilians killed by the Syrian army has reached 104 on 28 February, among them 35 in a regime-conducted massacre in Halfaya in the Hama suburbs. In addition, 26 were killed in a massacre in Baba Amr, including 3 women and 2 children; 37 in the Hama suburbs; 50 in Homs; 7 in the Aleppo suburbs; 5 in the Idlib suburbs; 3 in Deir Ezzor; and 1 in Daraa and 1 in Hama. Tunisia says ready to give asylum to Syria's Assad. According to the UN more than 7,500 people have died in Syria since beginning of the uprising.

=== 29 February ===
Syrian security forces are advancing on the rebel-held neighbourhood of Baba Amr in the city of Homs. The Pentagon is going over plans for a potential operation in Syria. U.N. humanitarian chief Valerie Amos says Syria has denied her repeated requests to visit country. Libya will donate $100 million in humanitarian aid to the Syrian opposition and allow them to open an office in Tripoli.

The LCC reported that 30 people were killed by the Syrian army on 29 February, but could not include the death toll from Baba Amr due to lack of communication.

== March 2012 ==
=== 1 March ===
The FSA and the local civilians withdrew from Baba Amr, after running out of ammunition, food, and water. 4,000 civilians refused to leave Baba Amr. The International Red Cross was given permission to send aid to Baba Amr. 42 civilians were killed by the Syrian army, including 23 in Homs. UK diplomats withdrawn from Syria.

=== 2 March ===
Mass Friday protests occurred throughout Syria, with the largest protesting occurring in Aleppo, central Homs, Idlib, Qamishli and the Damascus Suburbs as well as the central Damascus area. 75 protesters and civilians were killed throughout the day. Ten were killed in Baba Amr and 16 in Rastan after a protest was hit by mortar shells.

France is closing its embassy in Syria.

=== 3 March ===
47 soldiers who were caught attempting to defect were executed in the Idlib province. 30 civilians were killed by the security forces, including 8 in the Damascus suburbs. The Free Syrian Army claimed to have killed over 100 government soldiers in the Damascus suburbs in hit and run attacks on 3 March. Suicide bomber kills 2 in Deraa.

=== 4 March ===
The Syrian army shelled Rastan, killing 7 civilians. The Red crescent were denied access to Bab Amr, despite promises given to them that they could enter.

The father-in-law of the Syrian President, Bashar al-assad, said he was "horrified" at his son-in-law's brutal suppression of the Uprising and begged him to make democratic changes in the country before it was too late. As Syrian troops renewed their ferocious bombardment of the city of Homs Dr. Fawaz Akhras revealed for the first time that he has been quietly pushing for reform since before the revolution. Akhras said he feared for his daughter and his grandchildren, who could be killed by opposition fighters in revenge if the government falls. Some rumors said that Asma was being kept under virtual house arrest in Damascus by the presidents henchmen because they were scared she might leave the country, which would be a move that would damage the Syrian regime.

=== 5 March ===
Local Coordination Committees said that 15 people were killed by the Syrian army on 5 March. 6 were killed in Homs, 2 in each of Idlib, Daraa and Aleppo, and 1 in each of Yabroud in Damascus Suburbs, Jableh and Raqqa.

=== 6 March ===
At least 39 people were killed by the Syrian army, included 23 in Homs, according to the LCC.

=== 7 March ===
The LCC reported that at least 40 civilians were killed by the Syrian army on 7 March, including 23 in Homs. Russia's ambassador to the United Nations, Vitaly Churkin, claimed that he has information that there is a special training center for the Syrian revolutionaries in Libya.

The deputy oil and mineral wealth minister Abdo Hussameddin defected.

=== 8 March ===
The LCC reported that 62 civilians were killed across Syria including 52 in Homs, of which 44 were found summarily executed.

=== 9 March ===
82 civilians were killed throughout Syria, including 33 in Idlib and 26 in Homs. Mass Friday protests occurred, particularly in Aleppo, Homs, Hama, Daraa, Idlib, Deir ez-Zor and Qamishli.

Rebel groups reported that four generals had defected to the FSA, and had crossed into Turkish territory. Two other generals and four colonels had defected a few days before this event, bringing a total of six generals, according to opposition sources. A high ranking defector told reporters that the regime was detaining Sunni officers. It was claimed 2,000 officers had been detained by their own army. "Just being Sunni is suspect," he said.

=== 10 March ===
President Assad met international envoy Kofi Annan and promised him that he would back any "honest" peace bid but warned dialogue would fail if "terrorist groups" remained.

The Syrian army started the Battle of Idlib by heavily shelling the city with artillery, mortar and tanks. Later, infantry backed by tanks began to move into Idlib from the southeast. Witnesses described a shell landing every two minutes in the city, with no definite targets. The rebels were unable to fight back the shelling of the city which lasted until the night with a lull at midday.

The LCC reported that 63 civilians were killed by the Syrian army, including 47 in Idlib.

=== 11 March ===
At least 80 civilians were killed throughout Syria, primarily in Idlib and Homs.

The Free Syrian Army and the Syrian government clashed in central Damascus for the first time.

=== 12 March ===
50 civilians including children were massacred in the Karm al zhoutan and Bab Driad neighborhoods of Homs. An online video from Homs said to show the corpses of the massacre also identified some of the dead as having been burnt to death. The city of Idlib came under siege by the Syrian army, with water being turned off and neighborhoods under artillery shelling. 19 other civilians were killed by Syrian army according to the LCC, including 7 from Idlib.

=== 13 March ===
Both a pro-government newspaper and the opposition group SOHR reported that the Syrian Army took control of Idlib, with slight resistance to mop-up operations in three districts.

Activists reported that over 40 civilians were executed outside a mosque in Idlib by the Syrian army.

Separately, the LCC reported that additionally 46 civilians were killed across Syria, including 12 in Homs, bring the day's death toll to 86.

=== 14 March ===
Activists said that 76 were killed across Syria by security forces and the Syrian army.

=== 15 March ===
Syrian took to the street for the 1 year anniversary of the uprising, amongst intensifying crackdown in Homs, idlib, and Daraa. Pro-government counter rallies were also held in Umayyad square of Damascus as well as the Druze city of Sweida. Turkey confirmed the reports about 6 generals defecting earlier in the week, and added that another general defected to Turkey on 14 March.

55 civilians were killed across Syria, including 45 in Idlib. Activists reported that 23 bodies appearing to have been tortured and summarily executed were found in Idlib's countryside. Turkish media announced that Shabiha had captured and tortured two Turkish journalists who crossed into Syria.

A massacre took place in the Karm Allouz neighborhood in Homs in which 15 Syrians were killed, including a woman and her four children, one day before a Security Council session on Syria. According to the Syrian government the perpetrators were terrorist groups affiliated with al-Qaeda. This incident was cited by the government in the aftermath of the 25 May Houla massacre to support its contention that there was a pattern of these terrorist attacks escalating before Security Council sessions on Syria, or in that case, coinciding with UN special envoy Kofi Annan's announced visit to the country.

=== 16 March ===
Syrian protests took to the streets in weekly Friday protests, with the largest occurring in Aleppo, Homs, Hama, Qamishli, Damascus and its suburbs, the Idlib province and the Daraa province. Large protests also turned out in the Northeastern city of Raqqa, to which security forces fired on the crowd and reportedly killed a dozen people. Soldiers defected in Raqqa and began clashing with the regime's army. An increase in FSA attacks in Damascus and its suburbs was also noted. Turkey requested that all its citizens living abroad in Syria return home to Turkey, and also publicly announced for the first time that is considering establishing a buffer zone on the northern border of Syria.

The LCC reported mid-day that 46 civilians were killed across Syria by the Syrian army and security forces, 37 of which died in the Idlib province.

=== 17 March ===
Syrian state television reported that twin bombs placed in two cars exploded, targeting Syria security offices and the aviation intelligence building in Damascus, reportedly killing at least 27 and wounding 97 people.

The LCC reported that 16 people across Syria were killed by the Syrian army, including 6 in the city of Raqqa and 2 who died under torture.

=== 18 March ===
At least three people have been killed and 25 injured in a car bomb explosion in the northern Syrian city of Aleppo, according to reports.

The LCC reported that 37 people were killed by the Syrian army throughout Syria, including 12 in Idlib.

=== 19 March ===
Army intelligence officer Abdel Barakat defected to Turkey, bringing with him hundreds of documents and files detailing orders from Bashar al Assad to crack down on and kill protesters. Amongst the leaked documents included plans to attack protesters in Syria's major cities including Damascus and Aleppo, how security operations are planned, and orders for security forces spy on foreign observers sent by the Arab league. Barakat's leaked documents also showed that the government spied on Arab League observers in the country. Barakat was in charge of collecting information from across Syria at the secret joint crisis management cell in Damascus, and had been one of Assad's most trusted officials. However, he had been a mole for the opposition for months, before he was compromised and went to Turkey to save his and any relatives' lives.

Heavy fighting occurred between the Free Syrian Army and government forces in central Damascus, particularly in the Mezzeh neighborhood. Explosions and gunfire could be heard for several hours during the night, according to residents.

Turkey announced that two more generals defected to Turkey on 18 March.

The LCC reported that 30 civilians were killed across Syria by the Syrian army, including 9 in Dier Ezzor and 6 in Homs. At least 6 protesters were killed and 200 wounded after pro government-forces had fired on Friday in the street of Raqqa and in Damascus.

=== 20 March ===
The LCC reported that 57 civilians were killed across Syria by security forces, primarily in Homs and Deir Ezzor.

=== 21 March ===
70 civilians were killed across Syria by security forces and the Syrian army, included 40 in Homs, of which 25 were killed in a reported massacre.

=== 22 March ===
63 civilians were killed by security forces and the Syrian army, including 12 who were killed while trying to flee to Turkey.

The head of the ruling Ba'ath party in the north west city of Idlib announced his defection to the opposition, urging other high-ranking officials to do the same.

=== 23 March ===
Protesters took to the street for weeks Friday protests, amongst intense fighting nationwide between the FSA and the Syrian army. The SOHR reported that several hundred thousand speople joined the protests across the country. The largest protests occurred in Central and Suburban Damascus, Daraa, Qamishli, Hasakah, the Idlib province, Aleppo, Homs, and the Hama province. By the end of the day 59 protesters and civilians were killed by Syrian government forces.

A pilot from the Syrian Army defected to Turkey. He had been ordered to kill civilian protesters, however, instead of this he targeted a military building in Aleppo until he ran out of ammo. A member of the Syrian National Council (SNC) confirmed that the defected pilot has reached Turkey, and said that President Bashar al-Assad's regime has become incapable in controlling the army. Fearing an attack against the presidential palace, the army is sending military pilots without ammunitions, the SNC member added.

=== 24 March ===
45 civilians were killed by Syrian government forces, primarily in Idlib and Homs, the LCC reported.

=== 25 March ===
65 civilians were killed across Syria by the Syrian army, primarily in the bombardment of Homs.

=== 26 March ===
The LCC reported that by mid-day 59 civilian were killed across Syria by the Syrian army, of which 33 died under artillery shelling in Homs.

The Syrian army renewed shelling on Zabadani in the Damascus outskirts, killing 4.

By the end of the day the 70 were killed across Syria, primarily in Homs. The opposition also reported that the FSA assassinated the head of Air force intelligence, Iyad Mando, in Damascus.

Syrian-Kurdish journalist Jawan Mohammed Qatna kidnapped and murdered by unknown assailants.

=== 27 March ===
70 civilians were killed in Syria by the Syrian army, the LCC reported. 40 of which were killed in Idlib, including 23 reportedly summarily executed in a field in Saraqib, Idlib province.

=== 28 March ===
The LCC reported that 30 civilians were killed by the Syrian army, 13 of which were killed in Homs.

Two British journalists of Algerian descent were killed by Shabiha while crossing the border from Turkey into Syria.

=== 29 March ===
60 civilians were killed throughout Syria, primarily in Homs and Idlib. The Free Syrian Army assassinated two colonels in central Aleppo, and kidnapped an air force general in Damascus. Three brigadier generals reportedly defected to the Free Syrian Army upon releasing defection videos in which they showed their officer cards.

=== 30 March ===
Protesters took to the streets in mass in weekly Friday protests, with the largest occurring in Damascus and its suburbs, Hama, Homs, the Idlib province, Aleppo and the Daraa province. 55 protesters and civilians were killed by security forces across the country, primarily in Homs and Deir Ezzor.

=== 31 March ===
40 people were killed by the Syrian army across Syria, primarily in Homs.

== April 2012 ==
=== 1 April ===
70 civilians were killed when the Syrian army launched artillery attacks on the central Homs neighborhoods and Deir Ezzor. The Friends of Syria meeting recognized the SNC as the legitimate representative of Syria, one step under full recognition as the sole government. The GCC countries announced that they intend to start paying and funding the Free Syrian Army and any army member who defects.

=== 2 April ===
65 civilians were killed across Syria from artillery shelling by the Syrian army, primarily in Homs and Dier Ezzor. The Free Syrian Army captured Homs's national hospital, where they found 75 unidentified corpses stored in the morgue. The combined death toll of 2 April's shelling and the recently found corpses brought the death toll for Monday to 140.

=== 3 April ===
29 civilians were killed across Syria, primarily in the shelling of Homs and Damascus's suburbs including Zabadani.

By the end of the day the LCC reported 80 civilians had been killed by the Syrian army, primarily in Homs and Idlib.

=== 4 April ===
101 civilians were reported killed by the Syrian army, primarily in the bombardment of Homs and sieges in the Idlib province.

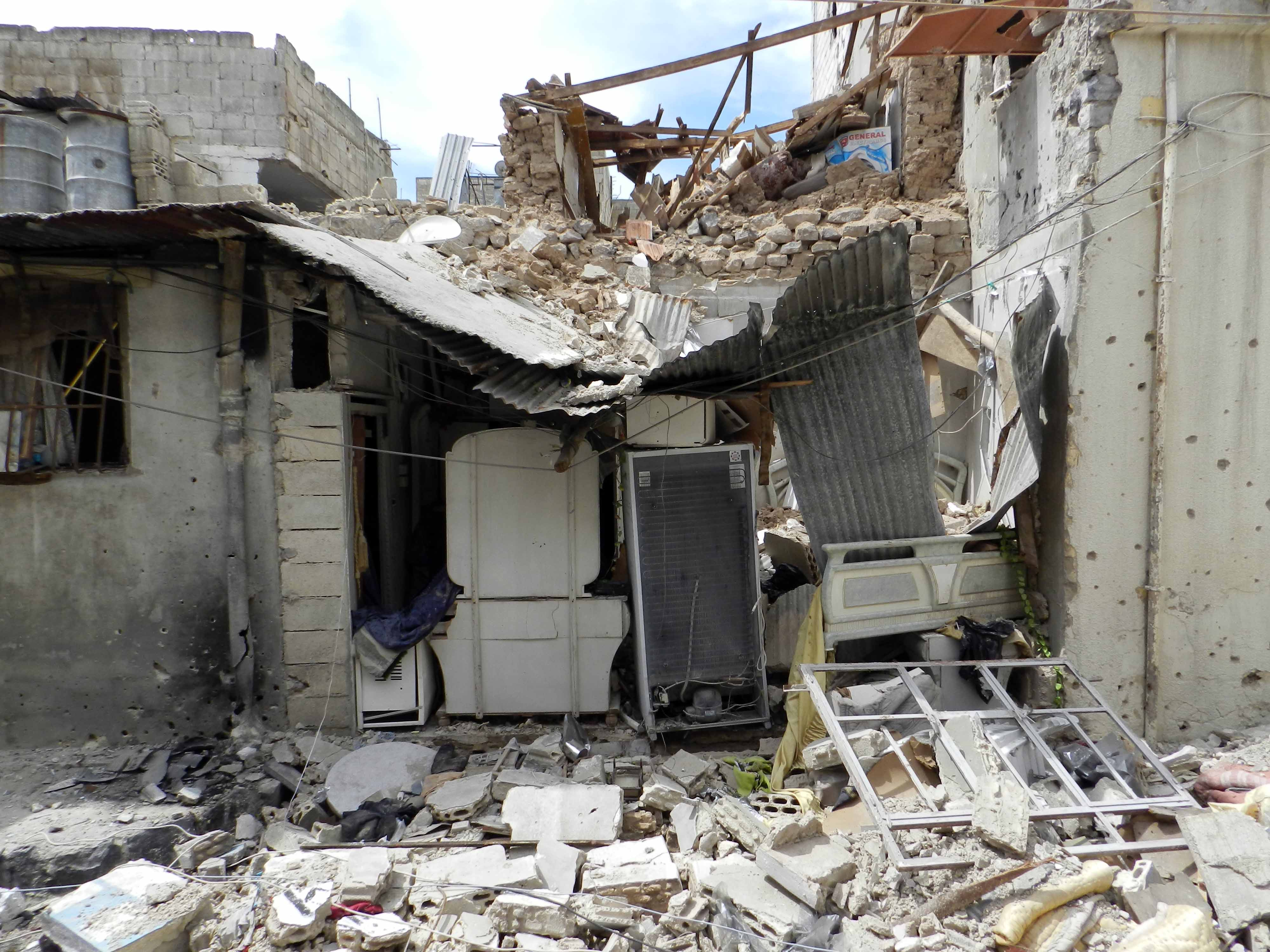
Destruction in Bab Dreeb area at Homs after heavy shelling by the Syrian Army

=== 5 April ===
70 civilians were killed across Syria by the Syrian army, primarily in Homs and Idlib.

=== 6 April ===
Protests took to the street in mass in weekly Friday protests, as ongoing sieges and clashes took place across Syria. The largest protests occurred in Damascus and its suburbs, Homs, Daraa, Idlib province, Aleppo, and Hama. Thousands of people fled the Aleppo province to Turkey, as 51 civilians were killed, primarily in the Syrian army's bombardment of Homs.

Separately, there have been reports that over 100 were killed in Taftanaz, Idlib, in a reported massacre by the Syrian army. Refugees fleeing from Taftanaz to Turkey reported mass graves and intentional burning of homes by the Syrian army.

=== 7 April ===
By mid-day, over 150 people were reported killed, primarily in the artillery shelling in Homs, but also over 50 dead when the Syrian army stormed rural villages in Hama.

=== 8 April ===
The LCC reported 45 civilians killed by the Syrian army, primarily in Homs and Idlib.

=== 9 April ===
160 civilians were killed by the Syrian army, including 52 in Homs, 45 in the Aleppo Provence, and 36 in Hama.

A journalist in Lebanon was killed by heavy machine gun fire from the Syrian army. Ali Shaaban, who works as a cameraman for Al Jadeed TV station, was shot as he was filming in the northern Wadi Khaled area on the Lebanese side of the border. The gunfire apparently came from the Syrian side of the frontier. His colleague, reporter Hussein Khreis, said the team heard heavy gunfire around them from all sides "falling like rain". Mr Shaaban was inside a car when he was struck, Mr Khreis said. "If you see the car you would think it was in a war zone," Mr Khreis said on Al Jadeed TV. "It is completely destroyed from the bullets." He said they waited for more than two hours for the Lebanese army and some residents to come and pull them out to safety. "I ask forgiveness from Ali's family because I couldn't do anything for him," he said, breaking into tears.

=== 10 April ===
101 civilians were killed by the Syrian army, including 56 in Homs and 22 in Hama.

=== 11 April ===
By mid-day the LCC reported over 100 civilian deaths, of which 57 were in Homs.

=== 12 April ===
The Kofi Annan sponsored ceasefire came into effect, but there were several occurrences of ceasefire violations by the Syrian army. Additionally the Syrian army did not withdraw its heavy weapons. At least 1 soldier and 24 others were wounded by an improvised explosive device near Aleppo.

The LCC reported 22 civilians killed by the Syrian army, including 9 in Homs.

=== 13 April ===
Mass weekly Friday protests broke out, with larger-than-usual protests occurring in Aleppo, Damascus and its Suburbs, Latakia, Deir Ezzor, Daraa, the Idlib province, Hama and Homs, despite no withdrawal of the Syrian army and heavy weaponry from cities. 11 protesters were reported killed by the evening. Some places such as Zabadani and al Quseir Homs were shelled despite a ceasefire.

=== 14 April ===
27 civilians were killed by the Syrian army, including 13 in Homs when the Syrian army shelled the central neighborhood of Homs despite the cease-fire. Security forces opened fire on a funeral in Aleppo city, killing 8 mourners.

=== 15 April ===
28 civilians were killed, as the intense shelling of Homs continued.

=== 16 April ===
By the end of the day 55 civilians were killed by the Syrian army, including 26 in Idlib.

=== 17 April ===
By the end of the day 77 civilians were killed by the Syrian army, primarily in Homs and Idlib.

=== 18 April ===
At least 32 civilians were killed by the Syrian army, primarily in Homs, Idlib, and Damascus. Ten soldiers were also killed by an IED near Idlib.

Also, Ban-Ki Moon, secretary-general for the UN, said that the Syrian Government had "yet to fully implement its initial obligations regarding the actions and deployments of its troops and heavy weapons, or to return them to barracks. Violent incidents and reports of casualties have escalated again in recent days, with reports of shelling of civilian areas and abuses by government forces."

Ban also said that the U.N observers deployed to Syria had yet to visit Homs because the Syrian government refused to give them permission to go there. Ban confirmed violent incidents when the UN observers went to Arbeen, in the Damascus suburbs, and said that a crowd of opposition demonstrators that had protested around the passing UN cars had been shot at, and one UN vehicle had been damaged.

=== 19 April ===
More secret documents were leaked from the Syria government. Highly classified documents from a covert Syrian government unit exposed attempts by the regime to contain the unrest sweeping the country, according to Al arabiya. These were leaked by a defector from this covert unit who was called Abdel-Majeed Barakat. He leaked copies of the Crisis Cell's official documentation, which included security force reports on deaths across the country, statements which admitted the mistreatment of Syrian civilians and prisoners and notes on the Syrian opposition. One month into the anti-government protests across Syria, this "Crisis Cell", was formed by President Bashar al-Assad's regime to monitor events and decide to tackle the unrest with military-led solutions. The cell included top intelligence, government and security force figures who documented events across Syria, gathering information which would reach the president directly on a daily basis.

42 civilians were reported killed by the Syrian army, including 27 in Homs.

=== 20 April ===
Over 50 civilians were killed, primarily in the Idlib region, as weekly Friday protests emerged in Syria, concentrating primarily in Aleppo city, Damascus and its Suburbs, the Daraa, Idlib, Homs, Deir Ezzor, and Hama provinces, and the Raqqa and Hasakah provinces. The Syrian Army continued its heavy bombardment on the Khalidya neighborhood of Homs, as state television reported that rebels killed 10 soldiers in Quneitra.

SANA reported the deaths of ten security forces in a roadside bombing in southern Syria. It also reported a bombing near Daraa province. Al Arabiya claimed that 5 more soldiers were killed in a bombing in the village of Karak. State media claimed that the first bomb was over 100 kg (220 lbs). It also reported that a police station was attacked by a group of men with machine guns, causing one policeman and one chief warrant's deaths.

=== 21 April ===
At least 40 civilians were killed by the Syrian army, mostly in Homs and Daraa.

=== 22 April ===
22 civilians were reported killed by the Syrian Army, as the Damascus suburbs came under artillery shelling. The presence of Tunisian volunteers was reported, with three Tunisian FSA fighters being confirmed to have died in combat.

=== 23 April ===
38 civilians alone were killed in a reported massacre by the Syrian army in central Hama, when the Syrian army launched a barrage of mortars against a neighborhood. 20 civilians were killed when the Syrian army shelled Douma. Another 22 civilians were killed throughout the country, primarily in Homs, Idlib, and Daraa, bringing the day's death toll to 80.

=== 24 April ===
38 civilians were killed by the Syrian army, including over a dozen in Homs and 9 in the Damascus suburbs.

=== 25 April ===
By the end of the day over 100 civilians were reported killed by the Syrian army, at least 70 of which were in Hama. In Hama, a rocket attack was reported to have completely destroyed a building. The Local Coordination Committees (LCC) said security forces fired a rocket at the building in the Mashaa Attayar area. Activists said among the dead were 13 children and 16 women, with more bodies still under the rubble. Footage on YouTube of the blast showed a crowd of men pulling out the bloodied body of a young girl. Another video shows the collapsed remains of the building, as ash-covered men dig through piles of masonry looking for bodies amid the cries of onlookers.

=== 26 April ===
At least 28 civilians were reported killed, primarily in Hama.

=== 27 April ===
Weekly Friday demonstrations came out against the Syrian government, amid 16 people being gunned down across the country by security forces fire, and 9 were killed when a suicide bomber blew himself up in al-Midan Damascus targeting security forces. Protests were largest in Aleppo, Homs, Hama, the Idlib and Daraa province, and Damascus and its suburbs.

=== 28 April ===
Hundreds of soldiers reportedly defected in Damascus and Latakia, amid clashes between rebels and the Syrian government. 15 civilians were reported killed by mid-day, and 9 soldiers and rebels were killed in fire-fights, Meanwhile, the Rebels made an amphibious attack near Latakia against the Syrian Regime's troops .

=== 29 April ===
The LCC reported 29 civilians killed by the Syrian along with two defectors.

=== 30 April ===
20 government soldiers were killed in three coordinated bombings in Idlib targeting security and military buildings. A car bomb exploded in Damascus Qudsaya causing unspecified number of casualties, and 28 civilians were killed across the country by the Syrian army, primarily in Homs.
