= 1981 in Syria =

- Decades: 1960s; 1970s; 1980s; 1990s; 2000s
- See also: History of Syria; Timeline of Syrian history; List of years in Syria

The following lists events that happened during 1981 in Syria.

== Incumbents ==
- President: Hafez al-Assad
- Prime Minister: Abdul Rauf al-Kasm (starting 9 January 1980)

== Events ==
=== March ===
- March 15 - Three hijackers holding hostages aboard a Pakistani jetliner surrendered to Syrian authorities, ending a 13-day ordeal.

=== April ===
- Hama massacre

=== May ===
- May 18 - Syrian missal crisis begins as Syria moves Soviet-made missiles into East Lebanon's Bekaa valley.

=== November ===
- November 29 - Azbakiyah bombing

=== Undated ===
- Ali Duba is promoted to Syrian military general.

== Births ==
- August 10 - Shadi Hamsho, professional boxer
- September 20 - Shady Othman, Arab-European actor
- November 10 - Saad al Ghefari, actor
- Undated
  - Hiba Al-Akkad, artist born in Damascus, Syria
  - Diana al-Hadid, contemporary artist
  - Nagham Hodaifa - Syrian artist
