= February 2012 Aleppo bombings =

Terrorist incident in Syria

- Part of the Syrian civil war
- Location: Aleppo, Syria
- Date: 10 February 2012; 09:00 (UTC+3)
- Attack type: Suicide car bombings
- Deaths: 28 (24 military and security personnel, 4 civilians)
- Injuries: 235
- Perpetrator: Al-Nusra Front

On 10 February 2012, two large bombs exploded at Syrian security forces buildings in Aleppo. According to the Syrian government and state media, the blasts were caused by two suicide car bombs. It reported that 28 people were killed (24 members of the security forces and four civilians) and 235 wounded. The bombings took place during the Syrian civil war and the government blamed armed opposition groups.

On 29 February 2012, the Al-Nusra Front claimed responsibility for the bombings.

== Background ==
On 23 December 2011, two large bombs exploded at Syrian military intelligence buildings in the capital Damascus. According to the Syrian government and state media, the blasts were caused by suicide car bombs and killed 44 people, mostly civilians. These were the first such bombings to take place during the uprising, which began in early 2011. The government blamed Islamist militants, while the opposition accused the government of staging the attacks to justify its crackdown on the uprising.

On 6 January 2012, another large bomb exploded in the al-Midan district of Damascus. The Syrian government claimed that a suicide bomber attacked buses carrying riot police shortly before an anti-government protest was to begin. It said that 26 people were killed, mostly civilians. As with the December bombings, the government blamed Islamists while the opposition accused the government of staging the attack. Activists pointed to video "mistakenly" aired by Syrian state TV, showing people setting "bags of vegetables" on the street to give the impression that some of the victims were civilians shopping in the nearby market.

The same day as the al-Midan bombing, Syrian opposition leader Ammar Qurabi claimed that the government was planning another bombing in Aleppo "to terrorize the people". He said he had learned of the plot from Syrian security officials.

Aleppo is a city of about 2 million that is home to a wealthy business community and merchant class who have mostly backed the government throughout the uprising. There had been relatively little violence and few protests in the city since the uprising began. The opposition had not had as much success in galvanizing support there, partly because business leaders have long swapped political freedoms for economic privileges. Aleppo also has a large population of Kurds, who have mostly stayed on the sidelines of the uprising since the government began giving them long-denied citizenship as a gesture to win support.

== Bombings ==
The Syrian Interior Ministry reported that, at 9 AM, a white minibus broke through the security barrier at the entrance of a law enforcement building in al-Arkoub district. The Associated Press (AP) named the building a "barracks of the Security Preservation forces". The Interior Ministry said that the driver then detonated explosives, blowing up himself and the minibus. Brigadier Firas Abbas told an AP reporter on a government-guided visit to the scene that the minibus made it through one roadblock before detonating near the gates. The blast reportedly killed 11 and wounded 130; both law enforcement personnel and civilians.

A few minutes later, another suicide bomber in another white minibus reportedly blew himself up while trying to drive into a military security building in New Aleppo district. News outlets reported that the building was a Military Intelligence Directorate compound. According to the Interior Ministry, the second bombing killed 17 and wounded 105, including military personnel and civilians. Syrian state TV reported that the bomb went off near a park where people had gathered for breakfast and children had been playing. Emergency workers were shown holding up body parts, which they put in black bin bags.

Security officials said that the dead included 11 security personnel killed at the barracks, 13 military personnel killed at the Military Intelligence building, and four civilians. The blasts thoroughly damaged surrounding buildings and left large craters in the road. One of the bombs tore through and flattened a steel-reinforced concrete perimeter wall. It was reckoned that the amount of explosives needed for such an explosion would be anywhere between 500 and 1,000 pounds (230–450 kg).

The opposition Local Coordination Committees claimed that security forces and Shabeeha killed 12 people at an anti-government protest in the Marjeh district of Aleppo not long after the blasts.

== Responsibility ==
In a video seen by AFP on 29 February 2012, the Al-Nusra Front claimed responsibility for the 6 January attack in Damascus and the twin suicide bombing in Aleppo on 10 February.

The anti-government Free Syrian Army (FSA) said it was operating in the area at the time, but denied responsibility for the blasts. Captain Ammar al-Wawi of the FSA said fighters from his group had a short clash with troops several hundred yards (meters) from the Military Intelligence building about an hour before the blast. Colonel Malik al-Kurdi, the FSA's deputy leader, said it had been monitoring the activity of security forces and Shabeeha at the Military Intelligence building and a police base in Aleppo on Friday morning. "When they were gathering in a square to go to the mosques and repress demonstrations, two groups from the FSA targeted the two buildings with small arms and rocket-propelled grenade fire," he said. "After violent clashes, there was an explosion inside the Military Intelligence building. At first we didn't know what it was, but we think it was the regime trying to stop the operation of the FSA," he added. FSA commander Arif al-Hummoud reportedly confirmed that the FSA had attacked two security force buildings "with only RPGs and light weapons". An FSA spokesman, Colonel Mahir Nouaimi, said: "This criminal regime is killing our children in Homs and carrying out bomb attacks in Aleppo to steer attention away from what it is doing in Homs".

Anti-government activists also accused the government of staging the attacks to smear the opposition and avert the weekly Friday protests in the city. According to The Washington Post, state media "touted the bombings as proof the regime faces a campaign by terrorists, not a popular uprising".

Izzedine al-Halabi, an anti-government activist in Aleppo, said there had been suspicious activity by security personnel that morning. He claimed they had sealed-off the area around the main intelligence compound shortly before the blasts, adding "We hold the Syrian regime entirely responsible for this explosion".

Abdul Rahman Abu Hothyfa, a spokesman for the opposition Syrian Revolution Coordinators Union, said it was "absolutely the regime" that carried out the attack. He said the security buildings were heavily guarded and that it would have been "impossible" for the opposition to launch such attacks.

The intelligence company STRATFOR analyzed that Syrian opposition were likely behind the bombings, but denied responsibility to avoid being tainted by accusations of terrorism. STRATFOR argued that the government did not stand to gain from a false-flag attack besides having another chance to call the opposition "terrorists". It said that any attack on security facilities harmed the government by raising questions about the strength of its internal security, which was key to the government's ability to hold power.

== Reactions ==
United Nations Secretary-General Ban Ki-moon strongly condemned the twin terrorist explosions that hit Aleppo.

== See also ==
- List of bombings during the Syrian civil war
