= 2012 Deir ez-Zor bombing =

2012 car bombing in Deir ez-Zor, Syria during the Syrian Civil War

- Part of the Syrian Civil War
- Location: Deir ez-Zor, Syria
- Date: 19 May 2012
- Target: military intelligence complex
- Deaths: 9
- Injuries: dozens

The 2012 Deir ez-Zor bombing involved a car bomb blast in the Syrian city of Deir ez-Zor killing 9 people on 19 May 2012 during the Syrian Civil War. The blast that reportedly struck a parking lot for a military intelligence complex also injured 100 people.

== See also ==
- List of bombings during the Syrian Civil War
