= June 2019 Syria bombings =

Islamic State bombing event in Syria

- Part of the Syrian civil war
- June 2019 Syria bombings (Syria)
- Location: Raqqa & Azaz, Syria
- Date: 2 June 2019
- Target: Civilians
- Deaths: 34+ (24 in Azaz) (10 in Raqqa)
- Injuries: 80+
- Perpetrator: Islamic State of Iraq and the Levant

On 2 June 2019 three IED (two of which were car bombs) were detonated by the Islamic State of Iraq and the Levant in northern Syria - one in Azaz and two in Raqqa. Over 30 people were killed, including civilians and dozens of others were wounded. Among the dead were five children.

== See also ==
- January 2017 Azaz bombing
- November 2019 Syria bombings
- Eastern Syria insurgency
- Turkey–ISIL conflict
