= March 2012 Aleppo bombing =

Car bomb blast in Aleppo, Syria

March 2012 Aleppo bombings
- Part of Syrian civil war
- Location: Aleppo, Syria
- Date: 18 March 2012; 13:30 (UTC+3)
- Attack type: car bomb
- Deaths: 3 (2 security personnel, 1 civilian)
- Injuries: more than 30
- Perpetrator: claimed by the Free Syrian Army

On 18 March 2012, a car bomb blast in a residential neighbourhood in the Syrian city of Aleppo killed two members of security forces and one female civilian. Some 30 residents were wounded. The Syrian state news agency called the explosion a "terrorist bombing".

Residential buildings and a nearby monastery were severely damaged as a result of the bomb blast.

It was the second bombing in the city in a series of deadly attacks that took place in the city during 2012, in the frames of the Syrian civil war.

== See also ==
- List of bombings during the Syrian Civil War
