= 1980 in Syria =

- Decades: 1960s; 1970s; 1980s; 1990s; 2000s
- See also: Other events of 1980; List of years in Syria

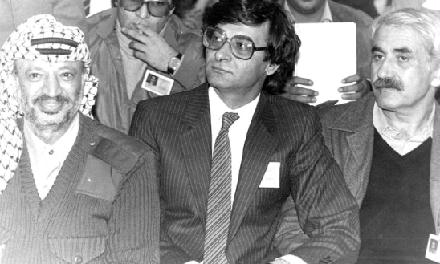
A picture for (left to right) Yasser Arafat, Mahmoud Darwish & George Habash taken in Syria circa 1980.

The following lists events that happened during 1980 in Syria.

== Incumbents ==
- President: Hafez al-Assad
- Prime Minister: Muhammad Ali al-Halabi (until 9 January), Abdul Rauf al-Kasm (starting 9 January)

== Events ==
=== April ===
- April 15 - Syria recognizes the Sahrawi Arab Democratic Republic.

=== June ===
- June 25 - A Muslim Brotherhood assassination attempt against President Hafez al-Assad fails. Assad retaliates by sending the army against them.
