= November 2019 Syria bombings =

Bombings in Syria

- Part of the 2019 Turkish offensive into north-eastern Syria; Eastern Syria insurgency and SDF insurgency in Northern Aleppo
- November 2019 Syria bombings (Syria)
- Location: Tell Abyad, Raqqa Governorate, Syria; Qamishli, Al-Hasakah Governorate, Syria; Al-Bab, Aleppo Governorate, Syria; Ras al-Ayn, al-Hasakah Governorate, Syria
- Date: 2–26 November 2019 (3 weeks and 3 days)
- Attack type: Car bombs
- Deaths: 13 (2 November); 8 (10 November); 6 (11 November); 19 (16 November); 10 (23 November); 17 (26 November); Total: 73
- Injuries: 30+ (2 November); 26 (10 November); 21 (11 November); 50 (16 November); 25 (23 November); 20 (26 November); Total: 172+
- Perpetrators: YPG and PKK (per Turkey), ISIL

In November 2019, six car bombings occurred in northern Syria. The bombings mostly happened in Tell Abyad and one in Al-Bab. The ISIL claimed responsibility for one, and the other five were alleged by Turkey to have been committed by the PKK.

== Background ==
The 2019 Turkish offensive into north-eastern Syria began in October 2019, supporting the Syrian opposition.

== Bombings ==
On 2 November 2019, a car bombing in a busy street of Tell Abyad killed 13 and injured dozens more. The bombing occurred in the middle of a marketplace in the district center of Tell Abyad near the border with Turkey. The bombing killed and injured mostly civilians. Turkey said that the YPG and PKK conducted the bombings.

On 10 November 2019, a car bombing occurred near Tell Abyad, killing 8 people and wounded numerous others. Turkey once again stated that YPG and PKK were behind the attack. The attack happened outside of a bakery, targeting fighters but the blast killed only civilians.

On 11 November 2019, a triple car bombing occurred in Qamishli, killing 6 people and wounding 21. ISIL claimed responsibility for the attack which happened in a commercial district and near a hotel.

On 16 November 2019, a few car bombs detonated near a bus station and a taxi station in Al-Bab, killing at least 19 and injuring around 50 others. Turkey condemned the attack and said the PKK was behind the bombing.

On 23 November, another car bomb targeted Tell Abyad; it killed ten people and wounded over 25 others.

On 26 November, a car bomb went off in the Turkish-controlled area west of Ras al-Ayn, killing at least 17 people and injuring 20 others. The attack happened at a local village market. Turkey blamed the YPG and PKK for the attack.

== See also ==
- Casualty recording
- Syrian Network for Human Rights
- January 2017 Azaz bombing
- June 2019 Syria bombings
