= February 2016 Homs bombings =

Terrorist incident in Syria in 2016

February 2016 Homs massacre
- Part of Syrian Civil War
- Location: Al-Zahra neighbourhood, Homs, Syria
- Date: 21 February 2016 +3 (EEST)
- Target: Alawite civilians heading to work
- Attack type: Mass murder
- Weapon: Car bombs
- Deaths: 64
- Injuries: 100+
- Perpetrator: Islamic State
- Motive: Sectarian

On 21 February 2016, two car bombs struck exploded in the predominantly Alawite neighborhood of al-Zahra in Homs, Syria. The bombings killed at least 57 people and injured more than 100 others. At least 60 surrounding buildings and dozens of cars were destroyed in the blasts.

== Bombings ==
The bombings occurred during the Sunday morning rush hour on the Sixtieth Street. The initial death toll was 34, but rose due to the number of people critically injured. According to a Syrian government television channel, they targeted students and government employees going to work. Dozens of vehicles were destroyed and a number of nearby buildings were damaged. It aimed supporters of the government at a time when it was making significant military gains.

The bombings occurred on the same day as bombings in the Damascus suburb of Sayyidah Zaynab that killed at least 30. Both the attacks in Homs and Damascus were claimed by the Islamic State.

Bombings in Homs in January 2016 had killed 22 people.

== See also ==
- February 2016 Sayyidah Zaynab bombings
