= Shadi Hamsho =

Syrian boxer

Shadi Hamsho was born on August 10, 1981, in Damascus, Syria. He is an undefeated professional boxer with a record of 10 wins, 0 losses and 3 knockouts as of 2009.

== Personal life ==
Hamsho grew up in Malmö, Sweden.

== Career ==
He was trained by Freddie Roach.

=== Amateur Record ===
- Scandinavian champion
