= 30 April 2012 Idlib bombings =

Car bombing targeting military checkpoints

- Part of Syrian Civil War
- Location: Idlib
- Date: 30 April 2012
- Deaths: 20+
- Injuries: 100+
- Perpetrators: Unclear, possibly Al-Nusra Front; Free Syrian Army; Syrian government

The 30 April 2012 Idlib bombings were carried out using three car bombs, two of them outside a military complex and one outside the university in Idlib, Syria. According to Syrian state television, the blasts severely damaged nearby buildings, killing eight people and wounding dozens more, while the UK-based Syrian Observatory for Human Rights (SOHR) claimed that the bombings killed 20 people, many of them security personnel.

== Background ==
Following the outbreak of the Syrian Civil War, the city of Idlib in the north of Syria saw intensifying clashes between government troops and rebel forces and by early 2012, portions of the city were taken over by the rebels. Beginning on 10 March 2012, the Syrian government deployed more troops to the area, and they were able to fully recapture Idlib in a few days, causing the bulk of the rebel forces to retreat towards Homs. Despite this, clashes within and around the city continued between government forces and the rebels. The Syrian army in Idlib reportedly killed 26 civilians in April. On 18 April, despite a ceasefire organized by the United Nations, the Syrian army shelled parts of the city, due to a continuing presence of opposition fighters in those areas.

== Bombings ==
On 30 April, three car bombs detonated in Idlib. Two of them targeted the Air Force Intelligence headquarters and the Military Intelligence building, located within several hundred meters of each other, with both exploding within five minutes. The bombs caused heavy damage, collapsing the fronts of several buildings and leaving large craters in the road. According to the Syrian Observatory of Human Rights (SOHR), at least 20 people were killed and over a hundred wounded. Hours later, a third car bomb exploded near the city's university, wounding several people but causing no fatalities. While the government blamed suicide bombers for the attack, State TV also showed an interview with a woman who claimed she saw men planting the bombs before running away.

The bombings took place only a few hundred meters from the building housing UN observers, who had recently been deployed to Idlib and other cities in Syria to oversee the implementation of the ceasefire set to begin on April 12. Syrian state TV later said that the observer mission, under the authority of General Robert Mood, toured the scene of the bombings. Despite actual responsibility being uncertain, the bombings marked a major escalation in the fighting in Idlib, and alongside several other attacks contributed to the collapse of the peace plan by early June.

== Responsibility ==
Syrian President Bashar al-Assad blamed the attack on terrorists seeking to destabilize the UN ceasefire attempts. The Free Syrian Army, the main rebel coalition fighting against Bashar al-Assad, denied responsibility for the attack. The opposition-aligned Local Coordination Committees accused the government of orchestrating the attack in order to derail the peace plan, claiming "the regime has resorted to these escalations every time there is political movement at the Arab, regional or international level to find a political solution."

== See also ==
- List of bombings during the Syrian civil war
