= 2015 Homs car bombing =

Terrorist attack in Syria

Homs car bombing
- Part of Syrian Civil War
- Location: Homs, Syria
- Date: 12 December 2015
- Attack type: Car bombs
- Deaths: 16
- Perpetrator: Islamic State of Iraq and the Levant

The 2015 Homs car bombing was a twin-explosion car bombing that killed 16 and injured many more. It occurred near a hospital in al-Zahra, an Alawite populated, government-controlled Neighborhood east of Homs' old city. The attack came five days after the government and rebels agreed on a local ceasefire in the western al-Waer suburb.
