= March 2012 Damascus bombings =

Terrorist incident in Syria

March 2012 Damascus Bombings
- Part of the Syrian Civil War
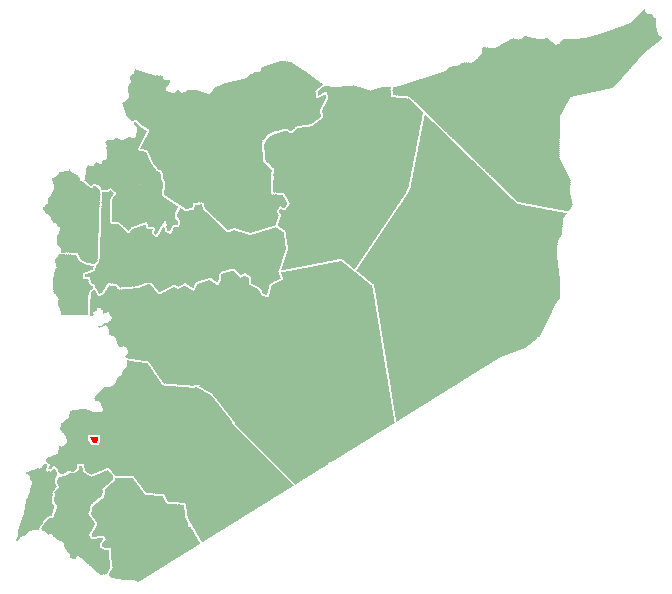
- Damascus highlighted within Syria
- Location: Damascus
- Date: March 17, 2012; 14 years ago 7:30 AM (UTC+2:00)
- Target: Government security buildings
- Attack type: Car bombings
- Deaths: 27
- Injuries: 140
- Perpetrator: al-Nusra Front

The March 2012 Damascus bombings were two large car bombs that exploded in front of the air intelligence and criminal security headquarters in the Syrian capital of Damascus. At least 27 people were reported killed and over a 140 injured in the fourth major bombing since the beginning of Syrian revolution and the second in the city. As in previous cases, the opposition blamed the government for orchestrating attacks, while the government placed the blame on terrorists and foreign groups.

== Background ==
The bombing came near the date of the one-year anniversary of the Syrian revolution. There had already been two bombings in Damascus and one in Aleppo. Another Aleppo car bombing came the next day, followed by a car bombing in Daraa.

== Bombings ==
Two large car bombs exploded on 17 March 2012 at 7:30 AM in front of the air intelligence and criminal security headquarters in the Syrian capital of Damascus. At least 27 people were reported killed and over a 140 injured.

The government placed the blame on terrorists and foreign groups, while the opposition blamed it for orchestrating attacks to divert attention from its atrocities.

Responsibility for the attack was claimed by the al-Nusra Front.

== Perpetrators ==
Al-Nusra Front is a jihadist group which also claims responsibility for the earlier al-Midan bombing and the Aleppo bombings.

== See also ==
- List of terrorist incidents in Syria
- 1986 Damascus bombings
