= 1981 Azbakiyah bombing =

Terrorist incident in Damascus, Syria

1981 Azbakiyah bombing تفجير الأزبكية
- Part of the Islamist uprising in Syria
- Location: Damascus, Syria
- Date: 29 November 1981
- Target: Intelligence agencies complex in al-Azbakiyah neighborhood
- Attack type: Car bomb
- Deaths: 64 Syrian civilians and military men
- Injuries: 135
- Perpetrator: Front for the Liberation of Lebanon from Foreigners

The 1981 Azbakiyah bombing (Arabic: تفجير الأزبكية) was a terrorist car bomb attack in the neighborhood of al-Azbakiyah, Damascus on 29 November 1981.

However, a group calling itself the Organisation for the Liberation of Lebanon from Foreigners claimed responsibility for the bombing. It is believed to be the same group as the Israeli-backed Front for the Liberation of Lebanon from Foreigners, which was responsible for a series of bombings in Lebanon, which killed 146 people.
