= March 2017 Damascus bombings =

Three suicide bombings in the Syrian capital

2017 Damascus bombings
- Part of the Syrian Civil War
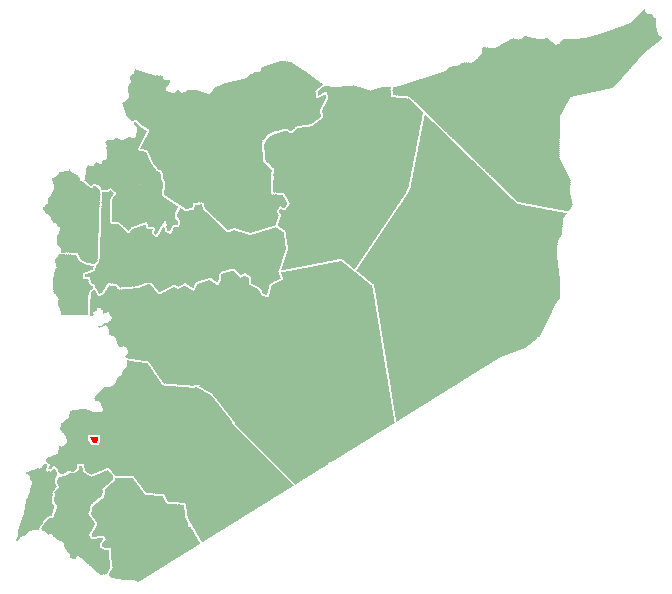
- Damascus highlighted within Syria
- Location: Damascus, Syria
- Date: March 11, 2017 (first attack); March 15, 2017 (second and third attack)
- Deaths: 74 (first attack, including 20 military and security personnel); 40 (second and third attack); Total: 114
- Injuries: 120 (first attack); 30+ (second and third attack) Total: 150+
- Perpetrators: Tahrir al-Sham (first attack); Islamic State (second and third attack)

In March 2017, three attacks occurred in the city of Damascus, Syria. The first happened on the March 11, when a double bomb suicide attack in the Old City of Damascus on Saturday killed dozens of people - mostly Iraqi Shia pilgrims - and wounded more than 100. The second and the third happened on the March 15, when two suicide bombers detonated their explosive vests in the capital's main judicial building and in a restaurant.

== Perpetrators ==
Hay'at Tahrir al-Sham claimed responsibility for the first attack, and the Islamic State claimed the second and the third.

== See also ==
- List of bombings during the Syrian Civil War
