= April 2012 Damascus bombings =

Suicide attack during the Syrian civil war

April 2012 Damascus Bombing
- Part of Syrian Civil War
- Location: Damascus
- Date: 27 April 2012
- Attack type: Suicide bombing
- Deaths: 9 (7 military and 2 civilian)
- Injuries: 28
- Perpetrator: al-Nusra Front

The 27 April 2012 Damascus bombing was a suicide attack that targeted the Syrian military, killing nine people. The event, occurred during the Syrian Civil War, was claimed by the al-Nusra Front, an al Qaeda-linked jihadist group.

== See also ==
- List of bombings during the Syrian Civil War
