= 10 May 2012 Damascus bombings =

Car bombing outside a military intelligence complex

10 May 2012 Damascus Bombing
- Part of Syrian Civil War
- Location: 33°29′26″N 36°19′13″E; Damascus
- Date: 10 May 2012
- Deaths: 55
- Injuries: ~400
- Perpetrators: Unclear, possibly Al-Nusra Front; Free Syrian Army; Syrian government

A pair of car bombs, allegedly detonated by suicide bombers, exploded outside a military intelligence complex in Damascus, Syria, on 10 May 2012. Combined, the perpetrators detonated more than 1,000 kilograms (2,200 lb) of explosives, tearing the facade off of a 10-story building. With 55 people confirmed dead and almost 400 others injured, the attack was the deadliest bombing until then in the Syrian Civil War, though later outpaced by other events.

== Bombing ==
The initial car bomb was detonated on a six-lane highway in the neighbourhood of Qazzaz adjacent to a military intelligence compound during the morning rush hour. The detonation destroyed the compound's security wall. As a crowd gathered around the site of the blast, a second, larger explosion quickly followed.

== Responsibility ==
The Syrian Interior Ministry said "foreign-backed terrorists" were responsible for the incident.

Opposition groups accused the Syrian government of staging the bombings to discredit the resistance to Bashar al-Assad's government. These claims were received with skepticism by some journalists and Middle East analysts who deemed it unlikely that the government would attack their own intelligence headquarters.

Bill Roggio, an analyst on terror and military issues, stated the attacks were "very likely" carried out by the al-Qaeda-linked opposition group Al-Nusra Front to Protect the Levant. This possibility was also visited upon by counter-terrorism expert Ghaffar Hussain who researched possible al-Qaeda involvement in the overall Syrian uprising.

Indeed, a man purporting to represent the Al-Nusra Front claimed responsibility for the attacks in a video released the following day. However, four days later, someone claiming to be a spokesman for the group denied that the organization was responsible for the attack, saying the video that was previously provided is a fake, and that any information regarding their operations would be announced through jihadi forums.

On 18 May, UN secretary general Ban Ki-moon stated that he believed al-Qaeda was behind the attack by saying: "Very alarmingly and surprisingly, a few days ago, there was a huge serious massive terrorist attack. I believe that there must be Al-Qaeda behind it. This has created again very serious problems".

The Guardian interviewed rebel defectors who worked at the Palestinian branch, where the bombing took place. The defectors also believed the government was responsible for the bombing. One of them is quoted as saying "Three days before the bomb the Alawite officers started disappearing and so too did all of the important prisoners ... The cameras were also taken down and the important files were removed. The only people left in the building when the explosion happened were Sunni officers and guards or some prisoners."

On 30 September Saudi state-owned Al Arabiya news claimed to have proof that the government were behind the attacks. They cited "classified government documents that had been acquired through the Syrian opposition". The documents allegedly indicate the purpose of the attack was to discredit the opposition and convince the international community that terrorists were active in the country. According to the Al Arabiya, Maj. Gen. Dhu al-Himma Shalish, head of presidential security, ordered Colonel Suhail Hassan of the Air Force Intelligence Directorate to carry out the bombing citing direct orders from the president.

== See also ==
- List of bombings during the Syrian civil war
