= 2016 Sayyidah Zaynab attacks =

ISIL terrorist incident in Syria

January 2016 Sayyidah Zaynab massacre
- Part of Syrian Civil War
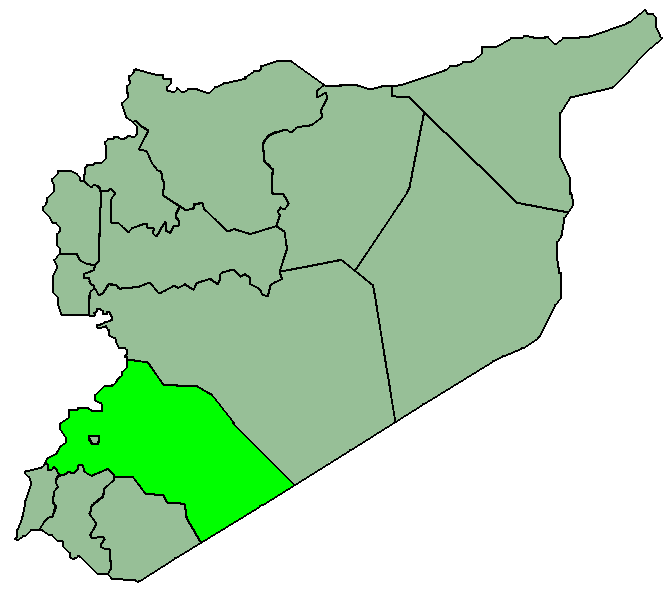
- Location: Sayyidah Zaynab, Rif Dimashq Governorate, Syria
- Date: 31 January 2016
- Target: Sayyidah Zaynab Mosque, Shii'te population
- Attack type: Mass murder
- Weapon: Car bombs
- Deaths: 71 (including 42 Syrian army and Shi'ite fighters)
- Injuries: 40+
- Perpetrator: Islamic State
- No. of participants: 2+
- Motive: Sectarian Anti-Shi'ism

February 2016 Sayyidah Zaynab bombings
- Part of Syrian Civil War
- Location: Sayyidah Zaynab, Syria
- Date: 21 February 2016
- Attack type: Suicide bombing, car bomb
- Deaths: 134
- Injuries: 180
- Perpetrator: Islamic State
- Motive: Sectarian Anti-Shi'ism

In early 2016 there was a series of bombings in the mainly Shi'ite town of Sayyidah Zaynab in Syria that were attributed to Islamic State.

== January ==
On 31 January 2016, two suicide bombs and a car bomb exploded in the mainly Shi'ite town of Sayyidah Zaynab near Syria's holiest Shi'ite shrine, the Sayyidah Zaynab Mosque. At least 60 people were killed including 25 Shi'ite fighters and another 110 people were wounded in the explosions. The Islamic State claimed responsibility for the attack. This is second time the Sayyidah Zaynab Mosque shrine has been targeted; in February 2015 two suicide attacks killed four people and wounded thirteen.

The death toll rose to 71, including 42 Syrian army and Shi'ite fighters as well as 29 civilians.

== February ==
The February 2016 Sayyidah Zaynab bombings occurred on 21 February 2016 after Islamic State militants detonated a car bomb and later launched two suicide bombings, about 400 meters from Sayyidah Zaynab Mosque, a Shia shrine, believed to contain the grave of Prophet Muhammad's granddaughter.

134 people were killed, including children. Syrian media said the attack occurred when pupils were leaving school in the area. Foreign led Syrian Observatory said 68 were killed. At least 60 shops were damaged as well as cars in the area. The attack, for which the Islamic State claimed responsibility, was the third attack in one year near the mosque.
