= January 2017 Azaz bombing =

Suicide attack during the Syrian civil war

Coordinates: 36.5861°N 37.0447°E

- Part of the Syrian civil war
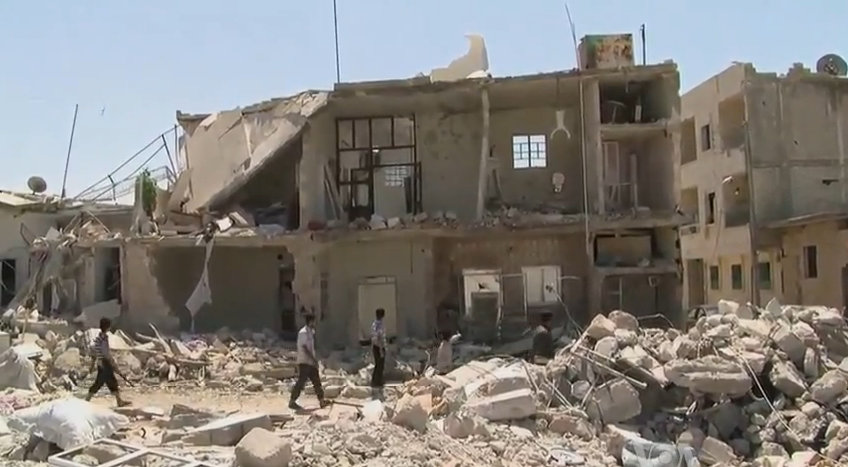
- Azaz, Syria during the Syrian civil war

- Azaz (Syria)
- Location: Azaz, Aleppo Governorate, Syria
- Date: 7 January 2017; 9 years ago
- Attack type: Car bombing
- Weapon: Car bomb
- Deaths: 60+
- Injuries: 50
- Perpetrator: ISIS
- Motive: Terrorism (suspected)

The January 2017 Azaz bombing occurred on 7 January 2017 when a car bomb exploded in front of a courthouse and near a market in the rebel-held city of Azaz, Syria, killing at least 60 people, mostly civilians, and wounding around 50 others. The Islamic State of Iraq and the Levant was suspected and blamed for the attack.

== See also ==
- List of terrorist incidents in January 2017
- 5 September 2016 Syria bombings
