= February 2013 Damascus bombings =

Terrorist incident in Syria

- Part of Syrian Civil War
- Location of Damascus in Syria
- Location: 33°31′33″N 36°18′01″E; Damascus, Syria
- Date: 21 February 2013
- Target: Headquarters of Ba'ath Party; Embassy of Russia in Damascus
- Attack type: Car bomb
- Deaths: 83
- Injuries: Unknown
- Perpetrator: Al-Nusra Front

On 21 February 2013, a series of car bombs were detonated in Damascus, killing 83 people. The largest and deadliest of the bombs occurred near the headquarters of Syria's ruling Ba'ath Party and the Russian Embassy, killing at least 60. Most of the victims were civilians including children.
