= January 2012 al-Midan bombing =

2012 suicide bombing in Damascus, Syria

2012 al-Midan bombing
- Part of the early insurgency phase of the Syrian civil war
- Location: 33.4833°N 36.2833°E; Al-Midan, Damascus, Syria
- Date: 6 January 2012; 10:55 (UTC+3)
- Attack type: Suicide bombing
- Deaths: 26 (including 11 police officers)
- Injuries: 63
- Perpetrator: Al-Nusra Front

On 6 January 2012, a bomb exploded in the Al-Midan district of Damascus, Syria. According to the Syrian government, a suicide bomber attacked buses carrying riot police shortly before an anti-government protest was to begin. It said that 26 people were killed and over 60 were injured. Most of the victims were civilians, though the Syrian government showed footage of what it claimed to be the funeral of 11 police officers killed in the attack.

It was the second such bombing since an uprising against the government began in early 2011. Two weeks earlier, a double car bombing in Damascus had killed 44 people. The government blamed that attack and the 6 January attack on al Qaeda. However, the Syrian opposition accused the government of staging the attacks to justify its crackdown on the uprising. Later, the newly formed Al-Nusra Front claimed responsibility in a video.

== Background ==
The attack occurred as Arab League monitors were in the country to see if Syria was abiding by Arab League demands that were said to have sought an end to the violence. Two weeks earlier, a double car bombing in Damascus had killed 44 people. The government blamed that attack on Islamist militants.

== Bombing ==
Most of the initial information about the attack comes from the Syrian government and state media. It reported that, at about 10:55, a suicide bomber detonated an explosive belt beside three buses carrying riot police. A police officer said that he had seen a man carrying a black bag walk toward a bus and then detonate the explosives. The buses were parked outside a police station that was near a primary school and a mosque. The bomb detonated at a traffic light under a concrete flyover, shattering windows and destroying several police cars. According to Syrian state media, it was estimated that the bomb was 10 kilograms of high explosive.

Syrian state news agency SANA reported that 26 were killed (including 15 who could not be identified) and 63 were hurt. It also said that most of the victims were civilians but that there were security personnel among the dead. Remains, allegedly those of the bomber, were left at the scene for several hours before being taken away for DNA tests. These and other body parts were repeatedly displayed for journalists who were driven to the scene by the Ministry of Information. State-owned television showed a damaged bus with blood and police helmets on the seats. Interior Minister Mohammed Shaar said that the bomber "detonated himself with the aim of killing the largest number of people."

=== Aftermath ===
Hundreds of Ba'athist government loyalists later arrived at the scene, some of whom were waving flags and chanting in support of Syrian president Bashar al-Assad. According to The New York Times, people living in the neighborhood reported that about an hour after the bombing, security forces and armed loyalists went on "a rampage, shooting randomly and beating and arresting people in the streets".

Despite the bombing, anti-government protests continued in Damascus and elsewhere in Syria. The Local Coordinating Committees said 14 protesters were killed in the suburbs of Damascus later that day. It also reported that nine protesters had been killed in Hama, eight were killed in Homs, three were killed in Idlib and one was killed in Daraa. SANA also reported that an oil pipeline between Hama and Idlib had been blown up by a "terrorist group."

== Perpetrators ==
The Interior Minister described the modus operandi and "intention to cause mass casualties" as having the "fingerprints of al-Qaida." Syria's interior ministry said the Ba'athist government would "strike back with an iron fist" to what it called "terrorist escalation".

Opposition groups accused the government of staging the attack to "sully the opposition’s image" and validate its own argument that it is "fighting blind violence rather than a pro-democracy movement." The Free Syrian Army (FSA), the main anti-government paramilitary group, denied involvement and condemned the attack. FSA spokesman Major Maher al-Naimi said: "This is planned and systematic state terrorism by the security forces of the President Bashar al-Assad". The Syrian National Council issued a statement reading: "Today's bombings, in the area that has experienced the largest of the anti-regime demonstrations, clearly bear the regime's fingerprints". The Syrian Muslim Brotherhood also blamed the government.

On 7 January, opposition activists accused the government of making fake television footage of the aftermath. The activists pointed to three clips "mistakenly" aired by Syrian state TV. One shows what seems to be an injured man on the ground standing up just before the end of the clip. Another shows a man with a microphone (allegedly a reporter for Syrian state TV) placing "bags of vegetables" in the street to give the impression that some of the victims were civilians shopping in the nearby market. The third video shows a person putting police shields in one of the damaged vans.

The same day as the bombing, Syrian opposition leader Ammar Qurabi claimed that the government was planning another bombing in Aleppo "to terrorize the people". He said he had learned of the plot from Syrian security officials.

At the end of February, the al-Nusra Front claimed responsibility for the attack and placed a 45-minute video on the Internet showing its preparation.

== See also ==
- List of terrorist incidents in Syria
