= 2011 Damascus bombings =

Terrorist incident in Syria

- Part of the Syrian Civil War
- Location: Damascus, Syria
- Date: 23 December 2011; EET (UTC+2)
- Attack type: Car bombs, shooting
- Deaths: 44
- Injuries: 166

On 23 December 2011, two seemingly coordinated bombings occurred in the Syrian capital Damascus. The alleged suicide car bombs exploded outside Syrian military intelligence agency buildings, killing 44 people and injuring 166. According to Syrian state media, most of the dead were civilians. The attacks took place during the Syrian revolution. The Syrian government blamed Islamist militants, while the Syrian opposition accused the government of staging the attacks to justify its crackdown on the uprising.

== Background ==
On the same day as the attacks, an Arab League team of observers arrived in Syria to monitor the government's activities and push towards a solution of the nine-month uprising against the government. Officials from the visiting team later visited the sites of both explosions. Government officials escorted the team to the scene of the explosions and reiterated their longtime claims that the uprising was not a popular one but the work of terrorists.

== Bombings ==
The bombings occurred in the Kfar Sousa neighbourhood, south-west of Damascus city center. The state-owned news channel, al-Ikhbariya al-Suriya, said the first car bomb exploded outside the offices of an unspecified security agency. When guards at a nearby General Security Directorate compound went to inspect the first blast, the driver of another vehicle rammed the main gates and detonated the bomb it was carrying. According to a Syrian journalist who lives in Kfar Sousa, gunfire was heard immediately following the blasts and windows up to 200 m (670 ft) away were shattered.

The bombings killed 44 people and injured 166. Syrian state media reported that most of the casualties were civilians.

== Perpetrators ==
=== Al-Qaeda ===
Immediately, the Syrian government claimed that al-Qaeda was behind these attacks. That Syrian claim was dismissed within a day by Canadian Foreign Minister John Baird as propaganda. Also the Syrian National Council dismissed it, as Syrian attempt to stoke Western fears for Islamist and extremist elements in the Syrian uprising.

==== Jabhat al-Nusra ====
In January 2013, commentator Jamie Dettmer for website The Daily Beast stated that the Al-Nusra Front perpetrated the attack, and that the U.S. National Counterterrorism Center assumed it to be carried out by two female suicide bombers from Iraq.

=== Syrian government ===
Syrian opposition leaders accused the government of staging the attacks to justify its crackdown on the uprising. Also former Lebanese prime minister Saad Hariri claimed the bombings were "engineered" by the Syrian government. The Free Syrian Army (FSA), the main anti-regime paramilitary group, accused the government of perpetrating the attack to gain sympathy from the Arab League and its observers, who had arrived just before the bombings. The Syrian National Council said "the Syrian regime, alone, bears all the direct responsibility for the two terrorist explosions", adding that the government wanted to create the impression "that it faces danger coming from abroad and not a popular revolution demanding freedom and dignity".

The Abdullah Azzam Brigades, an affiliate of Al-Qaeda in Iraq that operates throughout the Middle East, on 28 December 2011 denied all involvement in the suicide attacks, and called the regime's blame on al-Qaeda an attempt to deflect attention from its own brutal crackdown on protesters: "The only truly responsible for them is he who is benefiting from them (...) the regime of al Assad and his intelligence agencies".

==== Syrian intelligence ====
Mohammed Tayfour – the Syrian Muslim Brotherhood's 'Deputy Guide'—told Al Arabiya television that Syrian intelligence created a fake MB website and published a fake statement. He also said that, according to sources close to the Brotherhood, Syrian intelligence was behind the bombings.

== See also ==
- List of bombings during the Syrian civil war
