= Timeline of Syrian history =

This is a timeline of Syrian history, comprising important legal and territorial changes and political events in Syria and its predecessor states. To read about the background to these events, see History of Syria.

== 1st century BC ==
Year	Date	Event
64 BC		Syria became a Roman (later Byzantine) province.
40 BC		Syria is briefly captured by the Parthian forces under Pacorus I

== 2nd century ==
Year	Date	Event
198		Emperor Septimius Severus divided Syria into two provinces called Coele Syria and Syria Phoenice.

== 6th century ==
Year	Date	Event
526		The 526 Antioch earthquake and conflagration destroyed most of the city.

== 7th century ==
Year	Date	Event
614		Syria fell to the Sasanian forces under Shahrbaraz
636		Byzantine rule over Syria came to an end.
661		The reign of the Umayyad Caliphate began.

== 8th century ==
Year	Date	Event
750		The reign of the Umayyad Caliphate ended.

== 10th century ==
Year	Date	Event
977		Fatimid Caliph Abu Mansoor Nizar al-Aziz Billah conquered Ramla.
994		The Hamdanid dynasty came to power over Syria.

== 11th century ==
Year	Date	Event
1033		Al-Ma'arri writes "The Epistle of Forgiveness".
1097		First Crusade: The forces of the First Crusade captured Antioch.

== 13th century ==
Year	Date	Event
1260	1 March	Hulagu Khan, grandson of Genghis, conquered Damascus.
1260	September	Baibars, Mamluk Sultan, wages war with the Mongols to recapture Damascus and Aleppo.

== 15th century ==
Year	Date	Event
1485		The Ottomans invade Anatolia and Syria, starting the first Ottoman–Mamluk War (1485–1491).
1491		The Ottoman–Mamluk War (1485–1491) ends in a stalemate. A peace treaty is signed, returning Mamluk control to the pre-war status quo.

== 16th century ==
Year	Date	Event
1516		The Ottoman Empire established its rule over Syria.

== 19th century ==
Massacre of Aleppo

1860 Mount Lebanon civil war

== 20th century ==
Year	Date	Event
1918		The Ottoman Empire's rule over Syria came to an end.
1918	1 October	The Allies of World War I, joined by Arab nationalists, entered Damascus.
1920	April	San Remo conference: The conference partitioned the Ottoman Empire, establishing a French mandate in Syria and Lebanon.
1925	July	Great Syrian Revolt: Revolts started against French rule.
1936	September	The Franco-Syrian Treaty of Independence was signed.
1939		The monks of Alexandretta and Antioch were ceded to Turkey by the French.
1946	1 January	Syria was recognized as an independent republic.
1946	17 April	French troops evacuated Syria.
1947		The first Baʿth Party congress was held in Damascus.
1948		1948 Arab–Israeli War: Syria was involved in the war.
1958	1 February	The United Arab Republic (UAR) was formed by the union of Syria and Egypt.
1961	28 September	Following a military coup Syria seceded from the UAR, reestablishing itself as the Syrian Arab Republic.
1963	8 March	A coup brought in the Ba'ath Party into power beginning the establishment of Ba'athist Syria.
1967	5 June	Six-Day War: A war with Israel began.
1967		Six-Day War: The Golan Heights were occupied by Israel.
1970	13 November	Minister of Defense Hafez al-Assad effected a bloodless military coup and assumed the role of President.
1973	6 October	Yom Kippur War: Syria and Egypt fought against Israel.
1974	May	Syria and Israel signed a disengagement agreement.
1976		Syrian occupation of Lebanon: The Syrian occupation of Lebanon began.
1982	February	A Muslim Brotherhood uprising in Hama was suppressed by the military.
1990		Syria participated in a United States-led multinational coalition against Saddam Hussein.

== 21st century ==
Year	Date	Event
2000	10 June	Al-Assad died.
2000	10 July	Al-Assad's son Bashar al-Assad was made President.
2003	5 October	Ain es Saheb airstrike: Israel bombed a site near Damascus.
2005		Syrian occupation of Lebanon: Syria withdrew from Lebanon.
2007	6 September	Operation Orchard: Israel bombed a target in the area of Deir ez-Zor.
2008	October	Syria established diplomatic relations with Lebanon.
2011	26 January	Syrian Revolution: Anti-government protests began in Syria.
2015	30 September	Russia carries out its first air strikes in Syria.
2017	7 April	Donald Trump orders a missile attack on an airbase from which Ba'athist Syrian ar force planes allegedly staged a chemical weapons attack on Khan Shaykhun.
2024	8 December	The Assad regime collapsed after the rebels took Damascus ending 61 years of Ba'athist rule, while Bashar al-Assad fled to Russia.

== See also ==
Cities in Syria

- Timeline of Aleppo
- Timeline of Damascus
- Timeline of Hama
- Timeline of Latakia
