= Timeline of Aleppo =

Coordinates: 36°13′N 37°10′E

The following is a timeline of the history of the city of Aleppo, Syria.

== Prior to 10th century ==
- Founded before 2000 BCE
- 1800–1525 BCE – part of the Amorite dynasty
- 333 BCE – Alexander the Great in power.
- 286 BCE – Hellenic settlement of Beroea established.
- 88 BCE – City becomes part of Kingdom of Armenia.
- 64 BCE – City becomes part of Roman Syria.
- 611 CE – Persian Chosroes II in power.
- 637
  - July–October: Siege of Aleppo by Muslim forces.
  - Al-Shuaibiyah Mosque built.
- 717 – Great Mosque built.

== 10th–12th centuries ==
- 944 – Sayf al-Dawla in power.
- 962 – City sacked by the Byzantines.
- 1086 - Aleppo submit to the rule of Malik-Shah, the Turkish ruler of the Seljuk Empire
- 1094 – After defeating opposing Seljuk governor Aq Sunqur, Tutush becomes ruler of the city.
- 1124 – City besieged by Christian crusaders under Baldwin II of Jerusalem.
- 1124 – Al-Halawiyah Madrasa built.
- 1138 – 11 October: Earthquake was one of deadliest of all time.
- 1168 – Al-Muqaddamiyah Madrasa established.
- 1170 – 29 June: Earthquake.
- 1183 – Saladin assumes power.
- 1193
  - Az-Zahir Ghazi in power.
  - Al-Shadbakhtiyah Madrasa built.

== 13th century ==
- 1211 – Hammam al-Sultan built.
- 1212 – Bab al-Nasr (gate) rebuilt.
- 1218 – Aqueduct restored.
- 1223 – Al-Sultaniyah Madrasa established.
- 1230 – Bab al-Maqam (gate) built.
- 1236 – Al-Firdaws Madrasa established.
- 1237
  - Khanqah al-Farafira (monastery) and Al-Kameliyah Madrasa built.
  - Bab al-Nairab (gate) built (approximate date).
- 1242 – Al-Sharafiyah Madrasa built.
- 1251 – Al-Turantaiyah Madrasa built.
- 1256 – Bab Qinnasrin (gate) rebuilt.
- 1260 – City besieged by Mongol forces under Hulagu Khan.
- 1280 – City besieged by Mongol forces.

== 14th–15th centuries ==
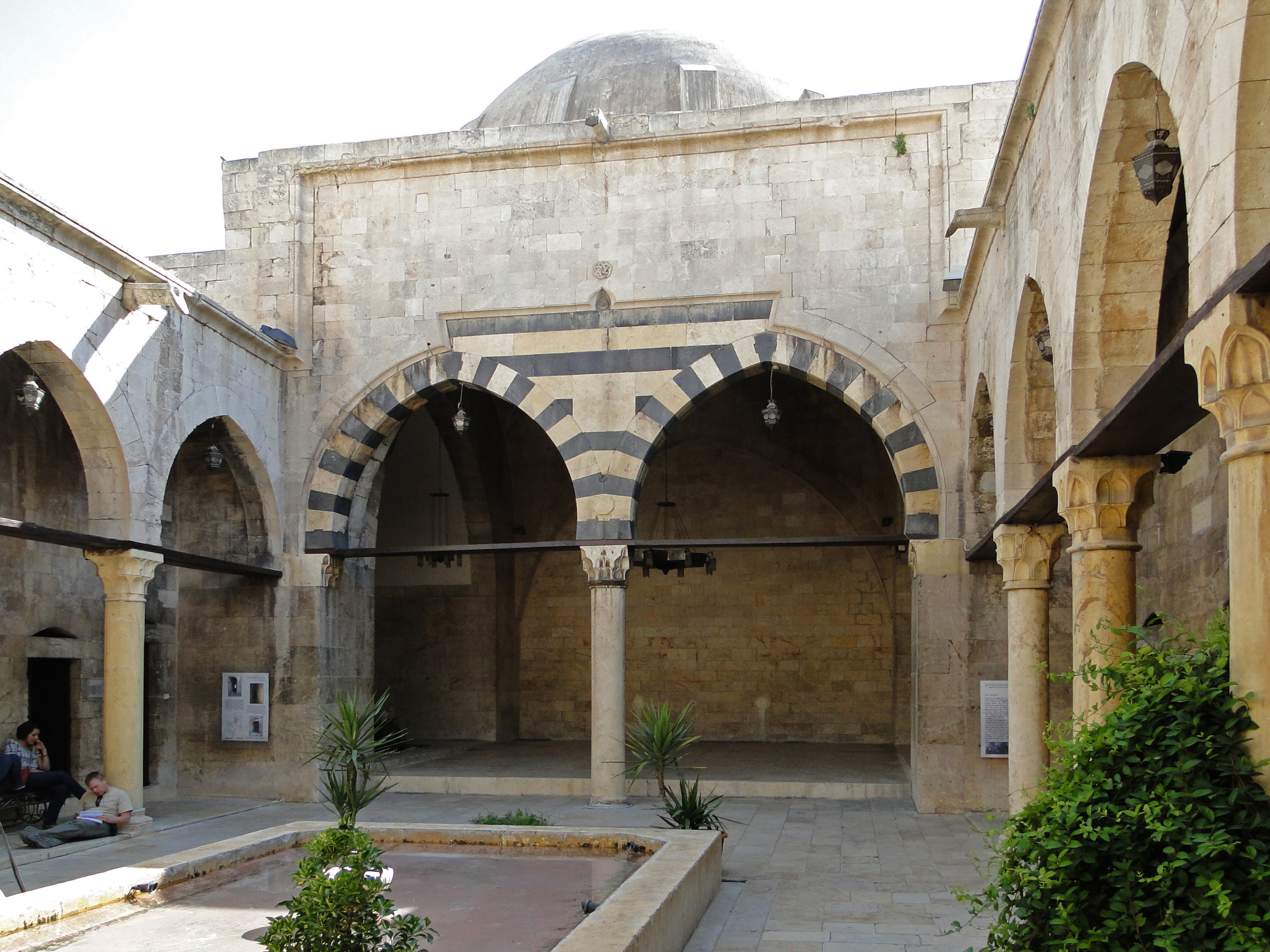
Bimaristan Arghun al-Kamili, 1354

- 1303 – Mahmandar Mosque built.
- 1318 – Altun Bogha Mosque built.
- 1350 – Al-Sahibiyah Mosque built.
- 1354 – Bimaristan Arghun al-Kamili (asylum) active.
- 1398 – Al-Otrush Mosque and Al-Tawashi mosque built.
- 1400 – City sacked by forces of Timur of Transoxia.
- 1427 – Citadel expanded.
- 1418 – Central Synagogue rebuilt.
- 1425 – Al-Saffahiyah Mosque built.
- 1429 – Forty Martyrs Cathedral consecrated.
- 1450
  - Khan al-Qadi active in Al-Madina Souq.
  - Hammam al-Bayadah built.
- 1472 – Khan al-Burghul built in Al-Madina Souq.
- 1491 – Hammam Yalbugha built.
- 1500
  - Cathedral of Our Lady of Syrians built.
  - Church of the Dormition of Our Lady renovated.

== 16th century ==
- 1509 – Bab al-Hadid (gate) rebuilt.
- 1516 – Ottoman Selim I in power.
- 1517 – Becomes part of Ottoman Empire.
- 1534 – City becomes capital of Aleppo Eyalet.
- 1537 – Population: 80,000.
- 1539 – Souq Khan al-Nahhaseen built in Al-Madina Souq.
- 1546 – Khan al-Shouneh built in Al-Madina Souq.
- 1547 – Khusruwiyah Mosque built.
- 1548 – Consulate of Republic of Venice established.
- 1557 – Al-Adiliyah Mosque built (approximate date).
- 1562 – Consulate of France established.
- 1583 – Consulate of England established.

== 17th–18th centuries ==
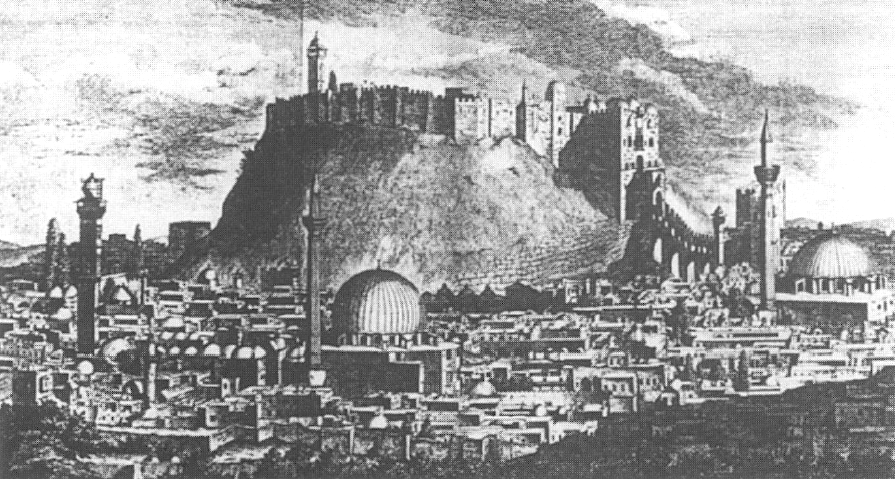
Aleppo, 1754

- 1603 – Beit Wakil (mansion) built.
- 1622 – Levant Company in business.
- 1613 – Consulate of the Netherlands established.
- 1629 – Guild of "makers of swords, knives, daggers, bows, and shields" organized.
- 1682 - Souq Khan al-Wazir built in Al-Madina Souq.
- 1683 - Population: 115,000.
- 1706 - Printing press established.
- 1724 – Al-Ahmadiyah Madrasa established.
- 1730 – Madrasa Ridaiya established.

== 19th century ==
- 1805 – Uprising.
- 1812 – Earthquake; citadel collapses.
- 1814 – "Janissary massacre."
- 1822 – Earthquake.
- 1823
  - Cholera outbreak.
  - Population: 250,000 (approximate).
- 1827 – Plague.
- 1830 – Earthquake.
- 1832
  - Ibrahim Pasha takes city for Muhammad Ali of Egypt.
  - Cholera outbreak.
- 1834 – Military barracks built in the Citadel.
- 1840 – Mohammed Ali relinquishes power.
- 1850
  - City besieged by Beduins.
  - Massacre of Aleppo (1850).
- 1853 – Pogrom of Jews.
- 1858 – Population: 70,000 (approximate).
- 1859 – Terre-Sainte College opens.
- 1864 – City becomes capital of Aleppo Vilayet.
- 1868 – Municipal council formed.
- 1873 – Saint Elias Cathedral built.
- 1875 – Pogrom of Jews.
- 1878 – Population: 95,000 (approximate).
- 1885 – Aleppo chamber of commerce founded.
- 1892 – Thanawiyyat al-Ma'mun (school) opens.
- 1899 - Bab al-Faraj Clock Tower built.

== 20th century ==
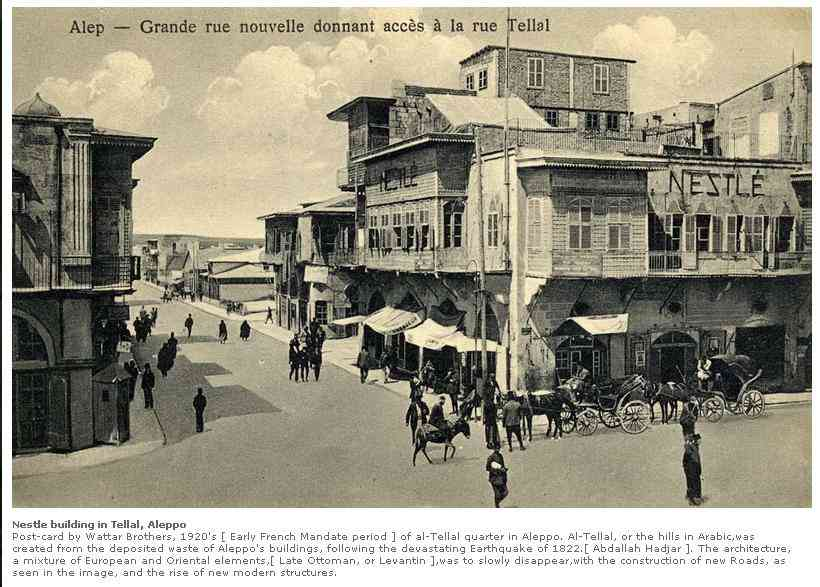
Aleppo Nestlé building; Tilel street 1920s, postcard by Wattar Brothers

- 1901 – Ades Synagogue established.
- 1906 – Hama-Aleppo railway in operation.
- 1909 – Abd al-Wahab al-Inklizi becomes mayor.
- 1910
  - Nadi al-Ta'ddud (Mutual Aid Society) founded.
  - Population: 130,000 (approximate).
- 1911 – Baron Hotel in business.
- 1912 – Baghdad Railway in operation.
- 1916 – Aleppo College established.
- 1918 – Ihsan al-Jabiri becomes mayor.
- 1920 - Syria mandated to the French; city becomes capital of State of Aleppo.
- 1922 - Red Hand Society organized (approximate date).
- 1924
  - Damascus and Aleppo united by the French.
  - Airport in operation (approximate date).
  - Municipal library established.
- 1925 – Al-Yarmouk Sporting Club formed.
- 1927 – al-Hadith journal begins publication.
- 1931 - National Museum of Aleppo founded.
- 1933 - Grand Serail d'Alep opens.
- 1936 - al-Nazir newspaper begins publication.
- 1945
  - National Library of Aleppo and Club d'Alep open.
- 1947 - Pogrom of Jews.
- 1948
  - People's Party established.
  - Al-Baladi Stadium opens.
- 1949
  - Aleppo Public Park created.
  - Al-Ittihad Sports Club and Jalaa FC formed.
- 1950
  - Population: 362,500.
  - al-Nass newspaper begins publication (approximate date).
- 1952 – Hurriya Sporting Club formed.
- 1958 – University of Aleppo established.
- 1963 – Nasserist insurgency.
- 1964 – Population: 547,030 (estimate).
- 1965 – Syrian Railways headquartered in city.
- 1970
  - Our Lady of Assumption church opens.
  - Population: 639,428.
- 1971 – Statue of Qustaki al-Himsi erected in Liberty Square.
- 1975 – Popular Traditions Museum opens in Beit Achiqbash.
- 1977 – International School of Aleppo established.
- 1979 – Aleppo Artillery School massacre took place by Muslim Brotherhood.
- 1980 – Siege of Aleppo.
- 1983 – International Center for Agricultural Research in the Dry Areas seed bank founded.
- 1985 – Population: 1,145,117 (estimate).
- 1986 – Al-Hamadaniah Stadium opens.
- 1990 – Population: 1,216,000.
- 1994
  - Aleppo Citadel Museum opens.
  - Population: 1,542,000 (estimate).
- 1997 – Lycée Français d'Alep established.

== 21st century ==
- 2002 – Private University of Science and Arts established.
- 2004 – Population: 2,132,100.
- 2006 – City designated an Islamic Capital of Culture.
- 2007 – Aleppo International Stadium opens.
- 2008
  - Sabah Fakhri Institute of music opened.
  - Population: 4,450,000 (estimate).
- 2012
  - 10 February: Bombings.
  - 18 March: Bombing.
  - 4 May: Protest and crackdown.
  - 19 July: Battle of Aleppo begins.
  - 9 September: Bombing near the 7 April Stadium.
  - 3 October: Bombing in Saadallah Al-Jabiri Square.
- 2013
  - 15 January: Aleppo University bombings.
  - 19 March: Chemical weapon attack by militants.
- 2016
  - 22 December: Battle of Aleppo ends.
- 2020
  - 16 February: Syrian Armed Forces recapture the entire city of Aleppo.
- 2024
  - 30 November: Syrian opposition forces capture most of the city in a surprise offensive.

== See also ==
- History of Aleppo
- Ancient City of Aleppo
- List of churches in Aleppo
- List of mosques in Aleppo
- List of rulers of Aleppo
- Timelines of other cities in Syria: Damascus, Hama, Homs, Latakia

== Bibliography ==
Published in 18th–19th century

- Alexander Russell (1756), "Description of the City of Aleppo", The Natural History of Aleppo, and Parts Adjacent, London: Printed for A. Millar, OCLC 13595445
- H. A. S. Dearborn (1819), "Aleppo", A Memoir on the Commerce and Navigation of the Black Sea, Boston: Wells & Lilly
- Jedidiah Morse; Richard C. Morse (1823), "Aleppo", New Universal Gazetteer (4th ed.), New Haven: S. Converse
- Henry Teonge (1825), "('Description of this cytty of Aleppo'...)", The Diary of Henry Teonge, chaplain on board His Majesty's ships Assistance, Bristol, and Royal Oak, anno 1675 to 1679, London: Charles Knight
- Josiah Conder (1834), "Aleppo", Dictionary of Geography, Ancient and Modern, London: T. Tegg
- John MacGregor (1844). "Trade of Aleppo". Commercial Statistics. London: C. Knight and Co. hdl:2027/nyp.33433024596516.
- "Aleppo", Handbook for Travellers in Syria and Palestine, London: J. Murray, 1858, OCLC 2300777
- J. Willoughby Rosse (1858). "Aleppo". Index of Dates ... Facts in the Chronology and History of the World. London: H.G. Bohn. hdl:2027/uva.x030807786 – via HathiTrust.
- "Aleppo", Palestine and Syria, Leipsig: Karl Baedeker, 1876 (+ 1898 ed. and 1912 ed.)

Published in 20th century

- "Aleppo", Chambers's Encyclopaedia, London: W. & R. Chambers, 1901
- "Aleppo" . Encyclopædia Britannica. Vol. 1 (11th ed.). 1910. p. 541.
- W.J.C. (1916). "Aleppo". Blackwood's Magazine. 200: 179–190. hdl:2027/uc1.b2927384.
- Ralph Davis, Aleppo and Devonshire Square English Traders in the Levant in the Eighteenth Century (1967) Macmillan
- Hector William Dinning (1920), "Aleppo", Nile to Aleppo, London: G. Allen & Unwin
- Andre Raymond (1984). "Population of Aleppo in the Sixteenth and Seventeenth Centuries according to Ottoman Census Documents". International Journal of Middle East Studies. 16 (4): 447–460. doi:10.1017/S002074380002849X. JSTOR 163151. S2CID 162113165.
- Yasser Tabbaa. "Circles of Power: Palace, Citadel, and City in Ayyubid Aleppo." Ars Orientalis 23 (1993): 181–200.
- Noelle Watson, ed. (1996). "Aleppo, Syria". International Dictionary of Historic Places: Middle East and Africa. UK: Routledge. ISBN 1-884964-03-6.

Published in 21st century

- David Dean Commins (2004). "Aleppo". Historical Dictionary of Syria. Scarecrow Press. ISBN 978-0-8108-4934-1.
- Josef W. Meri, ed. (2006). "Aleppo". Medieval Islamic Civilization. Routledge. p. 27. ISBN 978-0-415-96691-7.
- C. Edmund Bosworth, ed. (2007). "Aleppo". Historic Cities of the Islamic World. Leiden: Koninklijke Brill. p. 6. ISBN 978-9004153882.
- Jean-Claude David (2008). "Aleppo: from the Ottoman Metropolis to the Syrian City". In Salma K. Jayyusi; et al. (eds.). The City in the Islamic World. Leiden: Koninklijke Brill. pp. 329–356. ISBN 978-90-04-16240-2.
- Gabor Agoston; Bruce Alan Masters (2009). "Aleppo". Encyclopedia of the Ottoman Empire. Facts on File. p. 30. ISBN 978-1-4381-1025-7.
- Nora Lafi, "Building and Destroying Authenticity in Aleppo: Heritage between Conservation, Transformation, Destruction, and Re-Invention" in Christoph Bernhardt, Martin Sabrow, Achim Saupe (eds.)., Gebaute Geschichte. Historische Authentizität im Stadtraum, Göttingen, Wallstein, 2017, pp. 206–228.
- Winter, Stefan; Ade, Mafalda, eds. (2019). Aleppo and its Hinterland in the Ottoman Period / Alep et sa province à l'époque ottomane. Brill. ISBN 978-90-04-37902-2.
