= Hammam al-Nahhasin =

- حمام النحاسين
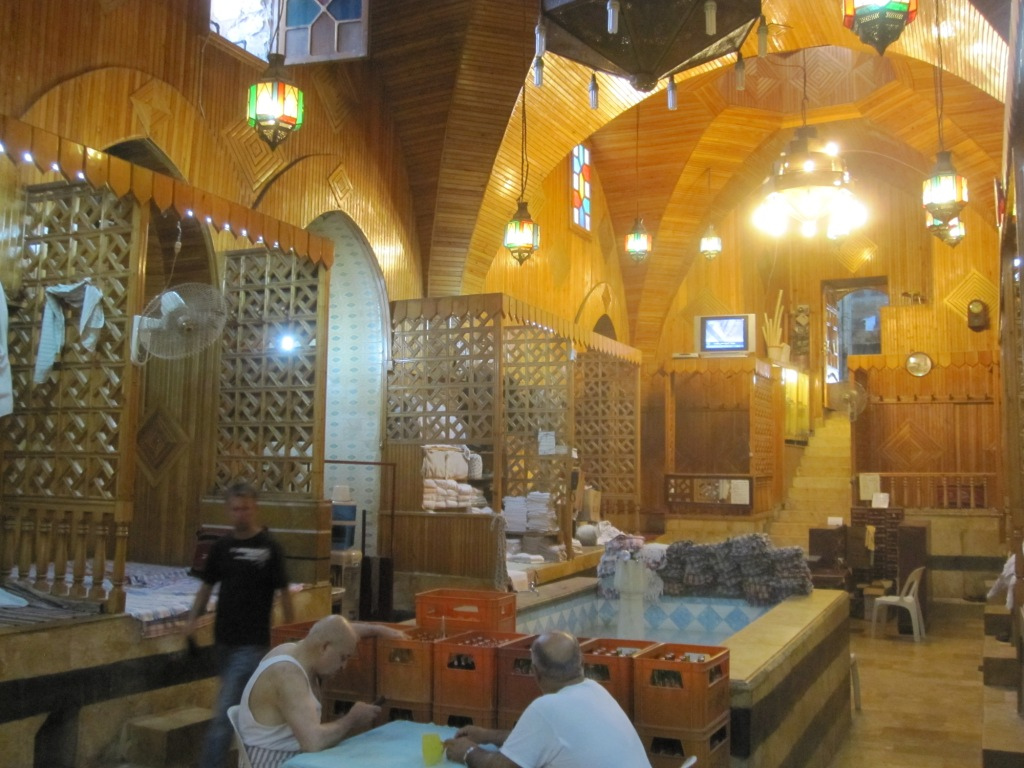
- Hammam al-Nahhasin in 2010
- Interactive map of the Hammam al-Nahhasin area

General information
- Type: Hammam
- Architectural style: Mamluk, Ottoman
- Location: Aleppo, Syria
- Completed: 12th century
- Renovated: 2021–2022
- Destroyed: 2012–16 (damaged)

Technical details
- Floor count: 1

Hammam al-Nahhasin (Arabic: حمام النحاسين) is one of the oldest and largest hammams (Turkish bathhouses) in Aleppo, Syria. It is located in Al-Madina Souq of the Ancient City of Aleppo, to the south of the Great Umayyad Mosque, near Khan al-Nahhasin.

== History ==
It was originally built in the 12th century by order from Aisha bint Salah al-Din al-Ayyubi and renovated several times during the Mamluk and Ottoman periods. However, most of the current building of the hammam belongs to the Ottoman period. Hammam al-Nahhasin literally means the bath of the coppersmiths.

== Current developments ==
The Hammam was damaged during the Battle of Aleppo (2012–2016). A comprehensive restoration of the hammam by DGAM began in 2021. The reconstruction was completed in January 2022. The hammam was reopened in November 2022 with the aim of returning to its original purpose.

== Interior layout ==
The hammam is divided into three sections:

- The internal section contains the warm rooms and the hot rooms. The warm rooms are designated for a short relaxation before taking bath. The hot rooms are designated for a full body wash and steam bath.
- The central section is designated for a massage after the body wash.
- The external section is the largest part of the hammam, characterized with its traditional wooden decorations and marble floor. Here, bathers can take a period of relaxation around the pond.

The hammam has an entirely isolated section for women called "Hammam as-Sitt".

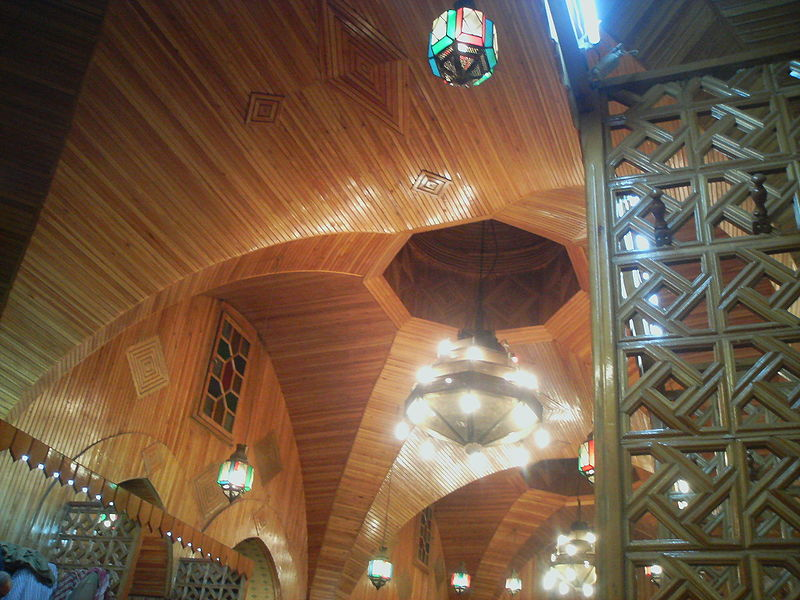
Interior of Hammam

== See also ==
- Hammam Yalbugha
- Hammam Bab al-Ahmar
