= Bab al-Ahmar =

Coordinates: 36°11′58″N 37°10′02″E

Bab al-Ahmar (Arabic: بَاب الْأَحْمَر, romanized: Bāb al-ʾAḥmar) meaning the Red Gate, was one of the nine historical gates of the Ancient City of Aleppo, Syria. The name was derived from the village of al-Hamr (Arabic: الحمر) as the gate was leading to the village at the eastern suburbs of ancient Aleppo.

== History ==
The gate was built in the eastern part of old Aleppo in the first half of the 13th century, during the reign of the Ayyubid emir of Aleppo al-Aziz Muhammad. It was renovated during the rule of the Mamluk sultan Al-Ashraf Qansuh al-Ghawri at the beginning of the 16th century. The gate was completely ruined in the 1830s by Ibrahim Pasha of Egypt during his campaign in Syria against the Ottomans between 1831 and 1833. in 1834, the stones of the gate were used to build the Ibrahim Pasha military barracks (the current Aleppo Citadel Museum) in the Citadel of Aleppo. The famous Hammam Bab al-Ahmar is located near the gate within the historic walls of the ancient city.

It was completely ruined during the Ottoman rule over Syria.
