= Timeline of Latakia =

Coordinates: 35°31′N 35°47′E

The following is a timeline of the history of the city of Latakia, Syria.

== Prior to 20th century ==
- 183 CE - Latakia Tetraporticus built.
- 330 CE - Now part of the Eastern Roman Empire
- 494 CE - Earthquake.
- 528 CE - Declared capital of the Byzantine province of Theodorias.
- 637 CE - Part of the Rashidun Caliphate
- 661 CE - Part of the Umayyad Caliphate
- 750 CE - Part of the Abbasid Caliphate
- 1102 - Tancred in power.
- 1104 - Battle of Harran and reoccupation by the Byzantine Empire
- 1170 - Earthquake.
- 1188 - Part of the Ayyubid Sultanate.
- 1287
  - al-Mansur Qala'un in power.
  - Earthquake.
- 1332 - Ibn Battuta visited the city during his travels
- 1725 - Sulayman Pasha al-'Azm of Tripoli in power.
- 1752 - 21 July: Earthquake.
- 1822 - Earthquake.
- 1829 - Franciscan monastery built.
- 1880 - Literary society founded.

== 20th century ==
- 1909 - April: Influx of refugees.
- 1920 - Latakia becomes part of the Alawite State of the French Mandate for Syria and the Lebanon.
- 1932 - Population: 24,000.
- 1933 - Church of the Sacred Heart of Jesus built.
- 1942
  - "France reunites ... Latakia with the rest of Syria."
  - July: "Explosion in a government building."
- 1943 - Population: 36,000.
- 1945 - Hutteen Sporting Club formed.
- 1947 - Tishreen Sports Club formed.
- 1950s - Port of Latakia expanded.
- 1955 - Latakia Camp of Palestinian refugees established.
- 1957 - Population: 56,000.
- 1970s - Ras Ibn Hani archaeological site discovered near Latakia.
- 1970 - Population: 125,716.
- 1971 - Latakia University established.
- 1973 - 7 October: Battle of Latakia occurs offshore.
- 1978 - Al-Assad Stadium opens.
- 1980 - Marine Research Center built.
- 1985 - Population: 229,944 (estimate).
- 1986 - National Museum of Latakia inaugurated.
- 1987
  - Latakia Sports City Stadium opens.
  - September: 1987 Mediterranean Games held.
  - Population: 241,000.
- 1989 - Naissa Mosque built.
- 1994 - Population: 303,000.

== 21st century ==
- 2004
  - Population: 383,786.
- 2008 - Population: 951,000 (estimate).
- 2011
  - 28 March: Antigovernment protest.
  - 13 August: Siege of Latakia.
- 2014
  - 22 September: Ancient tunnel uncovered beneath the National Museum of Latakia.
- 2015
  - 30 September: Khmeimim airbase, an airbase near the Latakia International Airport becomes operational for use by Russian troops.
- 2016
  - 2 June: Suicide bombing near a mosque in the city's center kills three civilians and injures several others.
  - 14 August: Asma al-Assad, the First Lady of Syria visits the city and attends the graduation ceremony for the 5th batch of students of the National Center for Distinguished Students.
  - 27 November: Al-Manara University opened.
- 2017
  - 25 March: Authorities seize large amounts of weapons and ammo that were to be smuggled to terrorists in Latakia.
  - 6 April: Latakia University (then Tishreen University) Hospital in Lattakia receives new batch of medical aid provided by Russia.
  - 4 May: Authorities arrest a criminal group responsible for a number of kidnappings and killings in the city and surrounding villages.
  - 4 September: Terrorist groups launch a missile onto Latakia causing material damage.
  - 10 October: Over 140 students graduate from the Arab Academy for Science and Technology and Maritime Transport in Latakia.
  - 24 October: A car rigged with 50 kg of explosives was seized by the authorities near a private hospital.
  - 17 November: Prime Minister of Syria Imad Khamis launches plans to rehabilitate the Al-Assad Sports City complex, which was closed temporarily during the civil war and used to house refugees from the city of Aleppo.
  - 18 November: A batch of aid sent from Belarus containing canned food, 2500 pieces of clothes and other relief materials arrives in Latakia to be distributed among hundreds of families affected by terrorism in Latakia, Damascus, and Homs.
  - 25 November: Following the liberation of the city of Deir ez-Zor from ISIL militants, 125 tons of citrus were sent from Latakia to the city of Deir ez-Zor.
  - 11 December: Russian president Vladimir Putin, accompanied by his Syrian counterpart Bashar al-Assad visits the Khmeimim airbase.
- 2024
  - 9 December: Syrian opposition took control over the city.

== See also ==
- Latakia history
- History of Latakia (in Arabic)
- Timelines of other cities in Syria: Aleppo, Damascus, Hama, Homs

== Bibliography ==
- "Ladikiyeh, Laodicea", Handbook for Travellers in Syria and Palestine, London: J. Murray, 1868, hdl:2027/uc1.b000916685
- Hogarth, David George (1910). "Latakia" . Encyclopædia Britannica. Vol. 16 (11th ed.). p. 239.
- "El-Ladikiyeh", Palestine and Syria (5th ed.), Leipsig: Karl Baedeker, 1912, hdl:2027/njp.32101064638636
- Ernst Honigmann [in German] (1934). "Al-Ladhikiya". Encyclopedia of Islam. Leiden: Brill. p. 3. ISBN 9004097910.
- Yasir Sari (1992). Safahat min Tarikh al-Ladhiqiyya (in Arabic). Damascus. (essays on Latakia city history)
- Noelle Watson, ed. (1996), "Latakia", International Dictionary of Historic Places, Fitzroy Dearborn, ISBN 9781884964039
