= Hammam Bab al-Ahmar =

- حمام الباب الأحمر
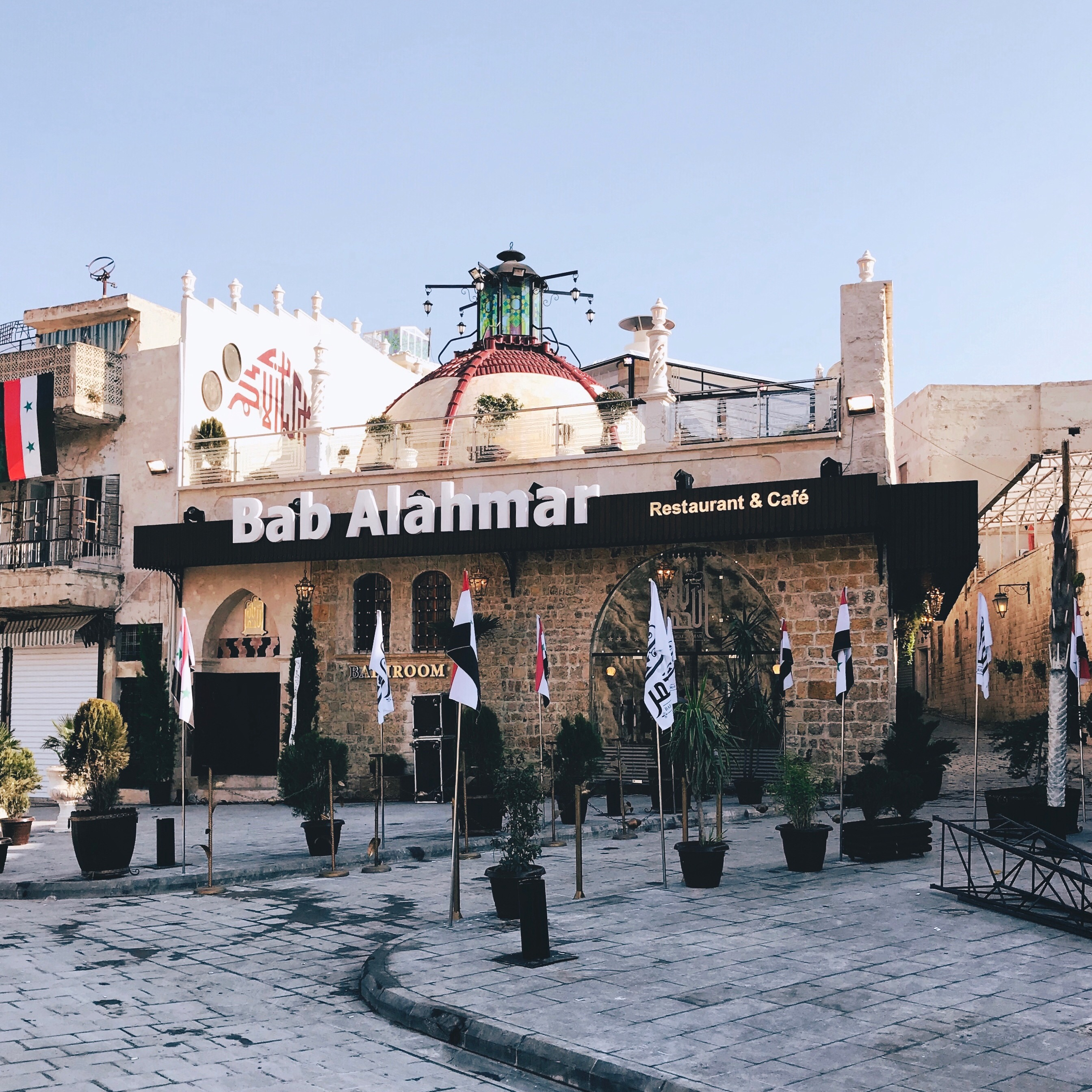
- Hammam Bab al-Ahmar in 2017
- Interactive map of the Hammam Bab al-Ahmar area

General information
- Type: Hammam
- Architectural style: Islamic Architecture
- Location: Aleppo, Syria
- Elevation: 400 metres (1,300 ft)
- Completed: Ottoman era
- Renovated: 2017
- Destroyed: 2012-2016 (damaged)

Technical details
- Floor count: 1
- Floor area: 1,500 square metres (16,000 sq ft)

Hammam Bab al-Ahmar (Arabic: حمام الباب الأحمر, romanized: Hamaam Bāb al-Aḥmar) meaning the Red Gate, is a hammam located in Aleppo.

Located in the Ancient City of Aleppo, near the Citadel of Aleppo, it is famous for its dome and decor from the Ottoman era.

The Hammam was closed and badly damaged due to the Syrian conflict. It was renovated in 2017 and a restaurant and café have been added to the spa.

== See also ==
- Hammam al-Nahassin
- Hammam Yalbougha
- Ancient City of Aleppo
- Bab al-Ahmar

== Notes ==
- Video of the state of destruction in 2015 of the Hammam Bab al-Ahmar
