= Timeline of Damascus =

Coordinates: 33.513°N 36.292°E

The following is a timeline of the history of the city of Damascus, Syria.

== Prior to 7th century ==
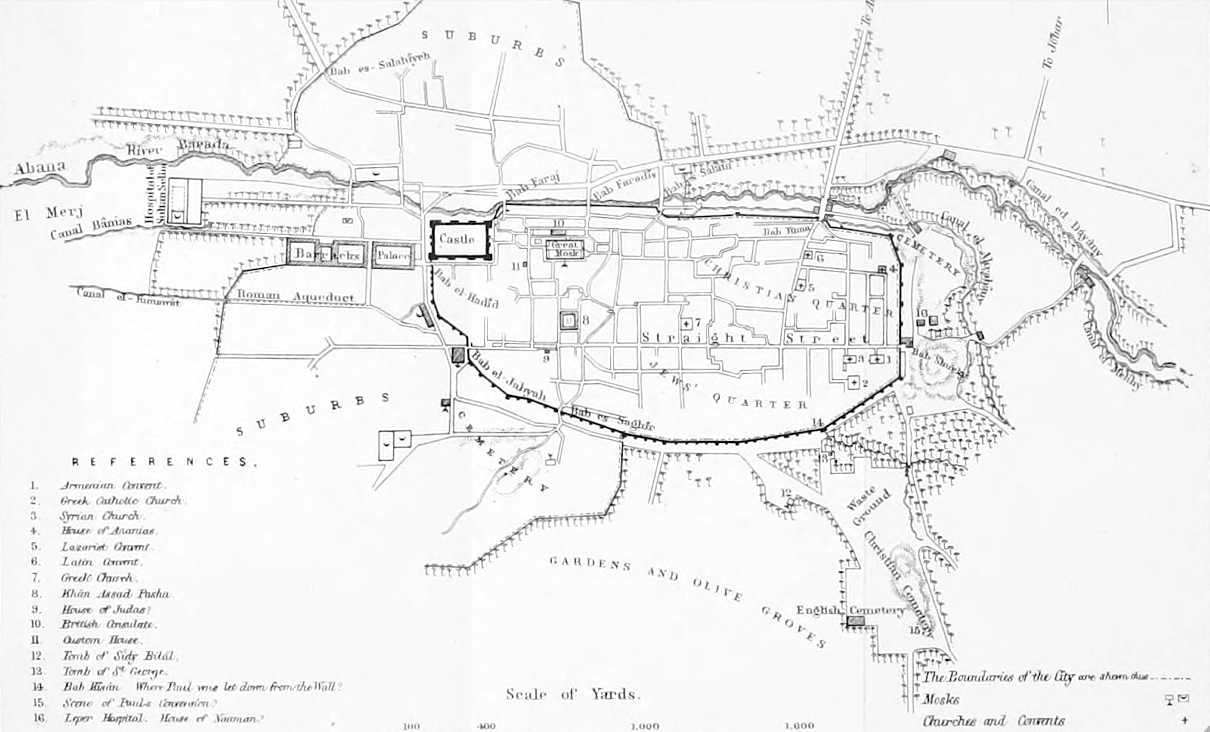
Map of Damascus in 1855

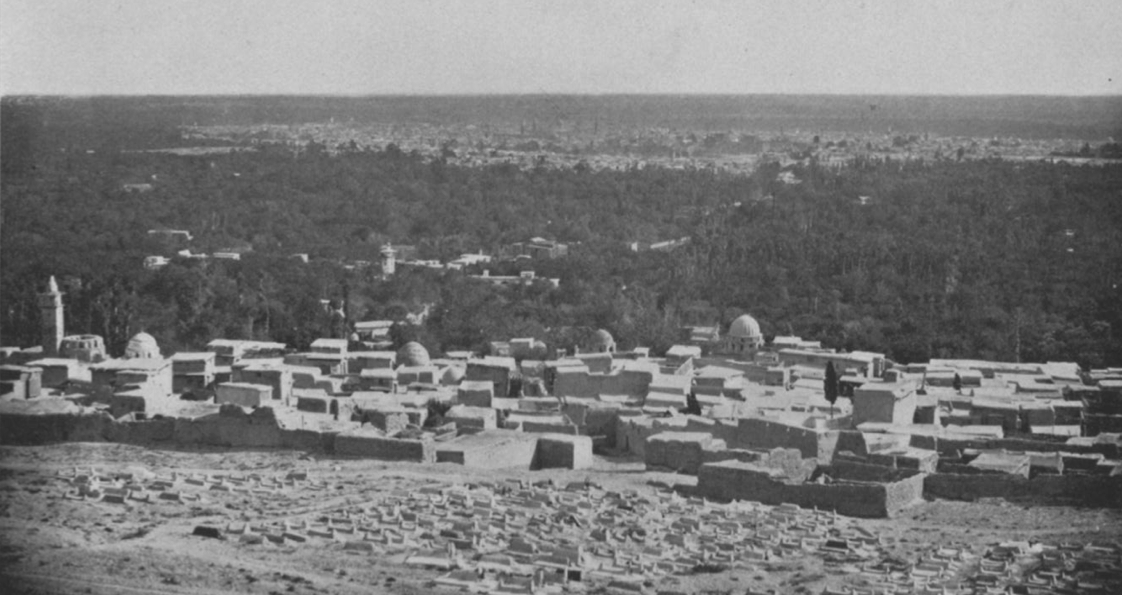
View of Damascus, 1898

- 965 BCE – Rezon, leader of a marauding band, conquers Damascus and becomes King of the Arameans.
- 843 BCE – Hazael assassinated Ben-Hadad I and made himself king of Aram-Damascus.
- 732 BCE – Neo-Assyrian Empire conquers Damascus
- 572 BCE – Neo-Babylonians conquered Damascus
- 538 BCE – Achaemenid Empire annexes Damascus
- 333 BCE – Alexander the Great conquers Damascus
- 112 BCE – Damascus fell to Antiochus IX Cyzicenus.
- 150 CE – Damascus became a Roman provincial city under Trajan.
- 4th century – Temple of Jupiter built by the Romans.

== 7th–19th centuries ==
- 613 – Sasanian captured Damascus during the Byzantine–Sasanian War of 602–628
- 634 – 21 August to 19 September: Arab conquest of Damascus under Khalid ibn al-Walid.
- 715 – Great Mosque built by Al-Walid I by converting the church of St John the Baptist constructed by Arcadius.
- 789 – Qubbat al-Khazna built.
- 1078 – Citadel of Damascus built.
- 1126 – Crusaders attacked Damascus.
- 1129 – Crusaders march on Damascus.
- 1142 – Al-Mujahidiyah Madrasa established.
- 1154 – Nur al-Din Bimaristan built.
- 1196 – Mausoleum of Saladin built.
- 1215 – Al-Adiliyah Madrasa founded.
- 1216 – Citadel of Damascus rebuilt.
- 1224 – Al-Rukniyah Madrasa built.
- 1229 – Damascus besieged
- 1234 – Aqsab Mosque built.
- 1250 – Qaymariyya hand city over to al-Nasir Yusuf in bloodless coup.
- 1254 – Al-Qilijiyah Madrasa established.
- 1260 – Kitbuga, a confidant of the Mongol Ilkhan Hulagu, captured Damascus. Then, it was captured five days after the Battle of Ain Jalut by the Mamluk Sultanate.
- 1277 – Al-Zahiriyah Library established.
- 1400 – Timur, the Turco-Mongol conqueror, besieges Damascus.
- 1515 – Al-Sibaiyah Madrasa built.
- 1516 – Ottomans under Selim I conquered Damascus from the Mamluks.
- 1518 – Salimiyya Takiyya built.
- 1558 – Sulaymaniyya Takiyya built.
- 1566 – Salimiyya Madrasa established.
- 1574 – Khan al-Harir built.
- 1605 – Printing press established.
- 1736 – Khan Sulayman Pasha built.
- 1750 – Azm Palace built.
- 1752 – Khan As'ad Pasha built.
- 1832 – Captured by Ibrahim Pasha of Egypt.
- 1840 – Return of the city to Turkish domination, when the Egyptians were driven out of Syria.
- 1860 – Massacre; the Moslem population rose against the Christians.
- 1885 – Bakdash (ice cream parlor) established.
- 1900 – Population: 154,000. (approx date)

== 20th century ==
- 1918 – October: Arab troops led by Emir Feisal, and supported by British Armed Forces, capture Damascus, ending 400 years of Ottoman rule.
- 1920 – July: French Armed Forces occupy Damascus, forcing Feisal to flee abroad.
- 1923 – University founded.
- 1925/6 – French forces bombard Damascus.
- 1928 – Al-Wahda Club of Damascus founded.
- 1933 – Arab Women's Union in Damascus founded.
- 1935 – Population: 193,912.
- 1939 – Chapel of Saint Paul inaugurated.
- 1946 – Population: 303,952.
- 1947 – Al-Jaish Sports Club founded.
- 1960 – Syrian Television begins broadcasting.
- 1961 – September: Discontent with Egyptian domination of the United Arab Republic prompts a group of Syrian Army officers to seize power in Damascus and dissolve the union.
- 1964 – Population: 562,907 (estimate).
- 1970 – Population: 836,668 city; 923,253 urban agglomeration.
- 1977 – Higher Institute for Dramatic Arts founded.
- 1981
  - Bomb explodes near Syrian Air Force headquarters.
  - Azbakiyah bombing
- 1983 – Higher Institute for Applied Science and Technology founded.
- 1984 – Al-Assad National Library established.
- 1985 – Population: 1,196,710 (estimate).
- 1986 – Bombings
- 1994 – Population: 1,549,000 (estimate).
- 2000 – Spring

== 21st century ==
- 2004 – Damascus Opera House inaugurated.
- 2006
  - February: "Danish and Norwegian embassies in Damascus are set on fire."
  - September: "Attack on the US embassy."
- 2008 – Population: 1,680,000 (estimate).
- 2009 – Damascus Securities Exchange founded.
- 2011
  - March: Protest; crackdown.
  - Syrian civil war begins.
- 2012
  - January 2012 al-Midan bombing
  - March 2012 Damascus bombings
  - April 2012 Damascus bombings
  - 10 May 2012 Damascus bombings.
  - Summer 2012 Damascus clashes
  - Battle of Damascus (2012)
- 2013
  - Damascus offensive
- 2018
  - May: Syrian Armed Forces recapture the entire city of Damascus.
- 2024
  - December: Syrian opposition forces captured the city.

== See also ==
- Timeline of Syrian history
- Timelines of other cities in Syria: Aleppo, Hama, Homs, Latakia

== Bibliography ==
=== Published in 19th century ===
- H. A. S. Dearborn (1819), "Damascus", A Memoir on the Commerce and Navigation of the Black Sea, Boston: Wells & Lilly
- Josiah Conder (1824), "Damascus", Syria and Asia Minor, London: James Duncan, OCLC 8888382
- John Fuller (1830), "Damascus", Narrative of a Tour Through Some Parts of the Turkish Empire, John Murray, OCLC 15470157
- David Brewster, ed. (1832). "Damascus". Edinburgh Encyclopædia. Vol. 7. Philadelphia: Joseph and Edward Parker. hdl:2027/mdp.39015068302770.
- Thomas Bartlett (1841). "Damascus". New Tablet of Memory; or, Chronicle of Remarkable Events. London: Thomas Kelly.
- Josias Leslie Porter (1855), Five years in Damascus: Including an Account of the History, Topography, and Antiquities of That City, London: J. Murray, OCLC 399684, OL 6951148M
- Charles Knight, ed. (1866). "Damascus". Geography. English Cyclopaedia. Vol. 2. London: Bradbury, Evans, & Co. hdl:2027/nyp.33433000064794.
- George Henry Townsend (1867), "Damascus", A Manual of Dates (2nd ed.), London: Frederick Warne & Co.
- "Damascus", Cook's Tourists' Handbook for Palestine and Syria, London: T. Cook & Son, 1876
- "Damascus", Palestine and Syria, Leipsig: Karl Baedeker, 1876. (+ 1898 ed.)
- Èmile Isambert (1881). "Damas". Itinéraire descriptif, historique et archéologique de l'Orient. Guides Joanne (in French). Vol. 3: Syrie, Palestine. hdl:2027/nyp.33433002689614.
- Guy Le Strange (1890), "Damascus", Palestine under the Moslems: a description of Syria and the Holy Land from A.D. 650 to 1500, London: A.P. Watt

=== Published in 20th century ===
- "Damascus", Chambers's Encyclopaedia, London: W. & R. Chambers, 1901
- D.S. Margoliouth (1907), Cairo, Jerusalem, and Damascus, London: Chatto & Windus, OL 23283598M
- Macalister, Robert Alexander Stewart (1910). "Damascus" . Encyclopædia Britannica. Vol. 7 (11th ed.). pp. 784–785.
- Benjamin Vincent (1910), "Damascus", Haydn's Dictionary of Dates (25th ed.), London: Ward, Lock & Co.
- R. Stephen Humphreys. "Urban Topography and Urban Society: Damascus under the Ayyubids and Mamluks." In his, Islamic History: A Framework for Inquiry. Minneapolis, 1988. pp. 209–32.
- Michael Chamberlain, Knowledge and Social Practice in Medieval Damascus, 1190–1350. Cambridge: Cambridge University Press, 1994. pp. 27–68.
- John Block Friedman; Kristen Mossler Figg (2000). "Damascus". Trade, Travel, and Exploration in the Middle Ages: an Encyclopedia. Routledge. p. 146+. ISBN 978-1-135-59094-9.

=== Published in 21st century ===
- Josef W. Meri, ed. (2006). "Damascus". Medieval Islamic Civilization. Routledge. p. 191. ISBN 978-0-415-96691-7.
- C. Edmund Bosworth, ed. (2007). "Damascus". Historic Cities of the Islamic World. Leiden: Koninklijke Brill. pp. 107–125. ISBN 978-9004153882.
- Michael R.T. Dumper; Bruce E. Stanley, eds. (2008), "Damascus", Cities of the Middle East and North Africa, Santa Barbara, USA: ABC-CLIO, p. 119+, ISBN 978-1-57607-919-5
- "Damascus". Grove Encyclopedia of Islamic Art & Architecture. Oxford University Press. 2009. pp. 513–517. ISBN 978-0-19-530991-1.
- Gabor Agoston; Bruce Alan Masters (2009). "Damascus". Encyclopedia of the Ottoman Empire. Facts on File. p. 168. ISBN 978-1-4381-1025-7.
- Pierkins, Russell S. (2017). "Damascus, Arab Conquest of (634 CE)". In Shaw, Jeffrey M.; Demy, Timothy J. (eds.). War and Religion: An Encyclopedia of Faith and Conflict. Vol. 1. ABC-CLIO. pp. 227–228. ISBN 978-1-61069-517-6.
