= Timeline of Homs =

Coordinates: 34°43′51″N 36°42′34″E

The following is a timeline of the history of the city of Homs, Syria.

== Prior to 7th century ==
- 3rd millennium BCE – Citadel of Homs was founded. Biblical scholars have identified the city with Hamath-zobah.
- 732 BCE – Syro-Ephraimite War, Assyrians in power.
- 540 BCE – Persian Achaemenid Empire in power (approximate date).
- 64 BCE – The Arab Emesani dynasty were confirmed in their rule as client kings of the Romans.
- 50 AD – Saint Mary Church of the Holy Belt was consecrated.
- 432 AD – Church of Saint Elian was consecrated.

== 7th–19th centuries ==
- 636 – Siege of Emesa, city was captured by Rashidun Caliphate.
- 750 – Abbasids wrested control of Homs.
- 855 – Christian population revolted in response to additional taxation under the reign of Caliph al-Mutawakkil.
- 891 – al-Yaqubi noted that Homs was situated along a broad river (Orontes River) which served as a source of drinking water for the inhabitants.
- 944 – Hamdanids took control of the city.
- 975 – Byzantine Empire under John Tzimiskes took control of the city.
- 1090 – Seljuk Turks occupied Homs under the leadership of Aq Sunqur al-Hajib.
- 1149 – The Mosul-based Zengids under Nur al-Din captured the city.
- 1154 – Al-Idrisi mentioned that Homs was populous, contained open markets, and was frequented by travelers. The residents were pleasant; living with them is easy. The women are beautiful and are celebrated for their fine skin."
- 1164 – Asad ad-Din Shirkuh became Homs' fief, later known as “Emir of Homs”.
- 1175 – Saladin gained control of the city.
- 1225 – Yaqut al-Hamawi mentioned that Homs was large, celebrated and walled, having a strongly fortified castle on its southern hill.
- 1355 – Ibn Batuta visited Homs, writing that it had fine trees and good markets.
- 1400 – Timur seized the city. Nevertheless, he did not sack it as he did in Aleppo, Hama and later Damascus, due to a man called “‘Amr bin al-Rawas” who conciled with him offering precious gifts to save the city.
- 1510 – al-Fadl bin Nu'ayr was sent on an expedition by the governor of Damascus to loot the city markets.
- 1516 – Ottoman Turks in power.
- 1549 – Homs Sanjak was created as part of Ottoman Aleppo Eyalet.
- 1579 – Homs is under Ottoman Tripoli Eyalet.
- 1785 – French traveler, Volney wrote of the city's once great importance and its current "miserable" condition.
- 1832–1840 – city was occupied by Muhammad Ali's Egypt led by Ibrahim Pasha.
- 1855 – National Evangelical School was founded by American missionaries.
- 1860s – The city rebelled against Egyptian rule and consequently, the citadel was destroyed when the Egyptians suppressed the revolt. Ottoman rule was soon restored.
- 1864 – Homs became part of Ottoman Syria Vilayet.
- 1870s – Homs' economic importance was boosted again during the depression of the 1870s, as its cotton industry boomed due to a decline European textile production. One British consul referred to Homs as the "Manchester of Syria."
- 1887 – Al Ghassania Orthodox School was established.

== 20th century ==
- 1907 – Population: 65,000 (estimate).
- 1908–1913 – Khalid ibn al-Walid Mosque was consecrated.
- 1918 – Homs was captured by the 5th Cavalry Division of the Allied forces in October 1918. Later on, it became part of the French Mandate of Syria.
- 1922 – Homs Museum's ground floor was established, 1st floor finished in 1949, and 2nd floor in 1963.
- 1925 – The city joined Damascus and the southern Druze chieftains in a full-blown revolt against French rule.
- 1928 – Al-Karamah SC was formed.
- 1930s
  - An oil pipeline between Tripoli and Kirkuk was built in Homs, and it followed an ancient caravan route between Palmyra and the Mediterranean.
  - The famous old Clock Tower, facing al-Hamidiya Street, was built by the French.
- 1932 – The French moved their military academy from Damascus to Homs to be established in 1933, later known as Homs Military Academy, and it remained the only military academy in Syria until 1967.
- 1937 – Al-Wathba SC was formed.
- 1959 – An oil refinery was built to process oil for domestic consumption. The city's oil refinery was bombed by the Israeli Air Force (IAF) during the 1973 Yom Kippur War.
- 1960
  - Khalid ibn al-Walid Stadium was opened.
  - Population: 136,000 (estimate).
- 1973 – Culture House Theater was established.
- 1974 – Homs Museum was inaugurated.
- 1979 – Homs University was established.
- 1981 – Population: 346,871 (estimate).
- 1994 – Population: 540,133 (estimate).
- 2000 – Bassel al-Assad Stadium with a capacity of 25,000 was inaugurated.

== 21st century ==
- 2004 – Population: 652,609 (estimate).
- 2008 – Population: 1,667,000 (estimate).
- 6 May 2011 – 9 May 2014 – Siege of Homs, Syrian Arab Army recaptured Homs.
- 2024 – Syrian opposition forces captured the city during the offensive in early December.

== See also ==
- Timelines of other cities in Syria: Aleppo, Damascus, Hama, Latakia

== Bibliography ==
- Dumper, Michael; Stanley, Bruce E.; Abu-Lughod, Janet L. (2007). Cities of the Middle East and North Africa: A Historical Encyclopedia. ABC-CLIO. ISBN 978-1-57607-919-5..
- Cook, Thomas (1907). Cook's Handbook for Palestine and Syria. Thos. Cook & Son. p. 362. "Homs population.".
- Gil, Moshe (1997) [1983]. A History of Palestine, 634–1099. Translated by Ethel Broido. Cambridge: Cambridge University Press. ISBN 0-521-59984-9..
- le Strange, Guy (1890). Palestine Under the Moslems: A Description of Syria and the Holy Land from A.D. 650 to 1500. Committee of the Palestine Exploration Fund. p. 493. ISBN 978-0-404-56288-5. "Lajjun Guy le Strange.".
- Shaw, Ezel Kural (1977). History of the Ottoman Empire and Modern Turkey. Cambridge University Press. ISBN 0-521-29166-6.
- Cleveland, William L. (2000). A History of the Modern Middle East: 2nd Edition. Westview Press. p. 215. ISBN 978-0-8133-3489-9. "Homs French."
- Commins, David Dean (2004). Historical Dictionary of Syria: 2nd Edition. Scarecrow Press. ISBN 0-8108-4934-8.
- Winckler, Onn (1998). Demographic developments and population policies in Baʻathist Syria. Sussex Academic Press. ISBN 978-1-902210-16-2.
