= Siege of Latakia (2011) =

2011 conflict

Coordinates: 35.5333°N 35.7833°E

- Part of the Early insurgency phase of the Syrian civil war
- Location: (Ba'athist Syria) Latakia, Syria
- Objective: Suppress anti-government protests
- Date: 13 – 19 August 2011 (6 days)
- Executed by: Syrian Armed Forces; Syrian Army; Syrian Navy
- Outcome: Anti-government protests suppressed
- Casualties: 6 killed (Government claim); 52+ killed (Los Angeles Times claim)

On 13 August 2011, during the early insurgency phase of the Syrian civil war, the Syrian Army and Syrian Navy launched an operation in the Syrian coastal city of Latakia in order to end an anti-Assad rebellion in the Palestinian camp. The operation resulted in dozens of people killed and wounded. Latakia has remained relatively quiet throughout the Syrian civil war subsequent to the operation.

== Background ==
The Palestinian camp in the al-Ramel area of Latakia had been a site of protest activity since March 2011. The Syrian government claimed 12 were killed there in clashes in late March, leading to the deployment of the military to restrict movement into and out of the city and the government announcing a string of reforms to appease the protesters. The Los Angeles Times claimed that hundreds of Syrians were arrested, and by late July, activists in Latakia were telling foreign media they feared a more violent crackdown was coming. Protests continued despite the increased security presence and arrests. Several civilians were allegedly killed in confrontations with security officers during this early period of the siege.

== Escalation ==
More than 20 tanks and APCs rolled into Latakia on 13 August 2011, according to the London-based Syrian Observatory for Human Rights (SOHR). It reported that activists said at least two civilians were killed in operations on 13 August.

On 14 August, the opposition Local Coordination Committees (LCC) claimed the death toll increased dramatically as the Syrian Army commenced an artillery and tank bombardment of outskirts of Latakia and the Syrian Navy fired on neighborhoods near the coast with gunboats armed with heavy machine guns. The SOHR said it had the names of 26 confirmed dead near Latakia, while SOHR said most of the deaths were caused by machine-gun fire. The Syrian government said two security officers and four armed men who were terrorizing residents were killed.

The military's assault reportedly continued on 15 August, when the Syrian Army ordered residents in southern and southeastern Latakia to evacuate. Al Jazeera reported that residents claimed soldiers were arresting Palestinians in central Latakia, transporting them with buses, and corralling them inside Al-Assad Stadium. The Syrian Revolution Coordinators Union, a coalition of opposition activists, said at least six were killed throughout the day in the camp near Latakia. The government denied it was directing gunboats against Latakia, calling the claims absolutely baseless, and said the ships off the coast of Latakia were part of an anti-smuggling patrol. The United Nations Relief and Works Agency for Palestine Refugees in the Near East (UNRWA) said more than 5,000 Palestinians had been forced to flee from a refugee camp on the outskirts of Latakia during the assault, and the LCC reported soldiers were moving from residence to residence in the camp and ordering the Palestinians to leave. The LCC also said there was random gunfire heard in the area. At least one resident reported the district containing the Palestinian camp was shelled, among others, and that heavy machine-gun fire was being directed at over half a dozen other neighborhoods in the city.

Avaaz, an international activist and human rights group, said it could name nine confirmed killed on 16 August in Latakia. Residents reported that many people were being detained as they attempted to flee the city. They also said shabiha, plainclothes pro-government militiamen, were looting homes and shops in the al-Ramel neighbourhood, where the Palestinian refugee camp is located, as well as attempting to remove any sign of shooting. One resident said he was afraid the neighbourhood would be completely destroyed.

A Los Angeles Times source that claimed to be a doctor in Latakia reported on 18 August that the claims of opposition activists, including the use of warships to attack the city and the detention of hundreds of civilians in a sports stadium, were true. He claimed more than 50 people had died since 14 August in Latakia. Sunni and Palestinian residents of the city were targeted disproportionately, according to his account, and homes were being destroyed by shelling, gunfire, and bulldozers to flush people out into the open where many were rounded up and arrested.

On 10 January 2012, video footage appeared to show a small crowd of pro-government demonstrators in Latakia surrounding and climbing onto the white vehicles used by Arab League monitors that had been sent to Syria, injuring 11 observers.
