= Timeline of Hama =

Coordinates: 35°08′N 36°45′E

The following is a timeline of the history of the city of Hama, Syria.

== Prior to 7th century ==
- 11th century BCE – Town is "capital of Aramean kingdom of Hamath."
- 854 BCE – Town taken by Assyrian Shalmaneser II.
- 743 BCE – Assyrians in power again.
- 740 BCE – Uprising.
- 720 BCE – Uprising "crushed by Sargon."
- 540 BCE – Persians in power (approximate date).
- 64 BCE – Town becomes part of the Roman province of Syria.

== 7th–19th centuries ==
- 639 CE – Town taken by Arab Muslim Abu Ubaidah ibn al-Jarrah.
- 637 – Great Mosque built.
- 10th century – Hamdanids in power.
- 968 – Town sacked by Byzantine forces of Nicephorus Phocas.
- 11th century – Town sacked by Mirdasid forces.
- 1108 – Tancred, Prince of Galilee takes town.
- 1114 – Seljuks in power.
- 1157 – Earthquake.
- 1172 – Nur al-Din Mosque built.
- 1175 – Saladin takes town from Zangids.
- 1178 – Al-Muzaffar I Umar becomes Emir of Hama.
- 1191 – Al-Mansur I Muhammad becomes Emir of Hama.
- 1221 – Al-Nasir Kilij Arslan becomes Emir of Hama.
- 1229 – Al-Muzaffar II Mahmud becomes Emir of Hama.
- 1244 – Al-Mansur Muhammad II becomes Emir of Hama.
- 1260 – Town sacked by Mongols.
- 1284 – Al-Muzaffar III Mahmud becomes Emir of Hama.
- 1299 – Mamluks in power.
- 1310 – Ayyubid Abu al-Fida becomes Emir of Hama.
- 1323 – al-Izzi Mosque built.
- 1326 – Abu'l-Fida Mosque built.
- 1331 – Al-Afdal Muhammad becomes Emir of Hama.
- 1400 – Timurlane takes town.
- 1453 – al-Mamunye (water wheel) constructed.
- 1516 – Ottoman Turks in power.
- 1556 – Khan Rustum Pasha (caravansary) built.
- 1742 – Azm Palace built.
- 1858 – Population: 30,000.
- 1864 – Town becomes capital of the Hamah sanjak (district) in the Vilayet of Sham.
- 1875 – Cholera outbreak.
- 1898 – Public library opens (approximate date).

== 20th century ==
- 1901 – Population: 45,000 (approximate).
- 1902 – Rayak-Hama railway begins operating.
- 1906 – Aleppo-Hama railway constructed.
- 1917 – Shaker al-Hanbali becomes mayor.
- 1918 – Town becomes part of French Mandate of Syria.
- 1925 – 1925 Hama uprising, early October uprising by Hama's inhabitants led by Fawzi al-Qawuqji against the French mandate, subsequent crackdown by French forces. Part of the Great Syrian Revolt.
- 1930 – Population: 60,000.
- 1941 – Al-Taliya Sport Club formed.
- 1945 – Al-Nawair Sport Club formed.
- 1946 – City becomes part of independent Syrian Republic.
- 1960 – Population: 97,390.
- 1963 – April: Anti-Baathist demonstrations.
- 1964
  - April: Conflict between Muslim Brotherhood and Baath leaders.
  - Population: 131,630 (estimate).
- 1970 – Population: 137,421.
- 1980 – February: Islamist uprising
- 1981 – April: 1981 Hama massacre.
- 1982 – February: Muslim Brotherhood uprising against Hafez al-Assad government; crackdown.
- 1985 – Population: 193,610 (estimate).
- 1989 – Apamea Cham Palace Hotel built.

== 21st century ==
- 2003 – Population: 427,369 (estimate).
- 2008 – Population: 1,508,000 (estimate).
- 2011
  - 15 March–3 July: Mass demonstrations.
  - 3 July–4 August: Army crackdown on protesters.
  - September–December: Hama Governorate clashes
- 2012
  - 14 April: City under full SAA control
  - 25 April: Explosion in Mashaa Attayar.
- 2012/13
  - Autumn–spring: Rebels in control of Hamidiyah, Tariq Halab and Al-Arbain neighbourhoods
- 2013
  - 25 April–15 June: Rest of the city captured by SAA during 2013 Hama offensive.
- 2024
  - 30 November–5 December: Syrian opposition forces captured the city following fierce clashes.

== See also ==
- Timelines of other cities in Syria: Aleppo, Damascus, Homs, Latakia

== Bibliography ==
Published in 19th century

- Abraham Rees (1819). "Hamah". The Cyclopædia. London.
- Josiah Conder (1830), "(Hamah)", The Modern Traveller, London: J.Duncan
- "Hamah", Handbook for Travellers in Syria and Palestine, London: J. Murray, 1858, OCLC 2300777
- "Hama", Palestine and Syria, Leipsig: Karl Baedeker, 1876

Published in 20th century

- "Hamah", Chambers's Encyclopaedia, London: W. & R. Chambers, 1901
- "Hamah" . Encyclopædia Britannica. Vol. 12 (11th ed.). 1910. p. 869.
- Trudy Ring, ed. (1996), "Hama", Middle East and Africa, International Dictionary of Historic Places, Routledge, ISBN 9781884964039
- N. E. Bou-Nacklie (1998). "Tumult in Syria's Hama in 1925: The Failure of a Revolt". Journal of Contemporary History. 33 (2): 273–289. doi:10.1177/002200949803300206. S2CID 159788188.

Published in 21st century

- J.L. Whitaker (2008), "Hamah", in Michael R.T. Dumper; Bruce E. Stanley (eds.), Cities of the Middle East and North Africa, Santa Barbara, USA: ABC-CLIO
- "Hama". Grove Encyclopedia of Islamic Art & Architecture. Oxford University Press. 2009.
