= Latakia Camp =

Palestinian refugee camp in Latakia, Syria

Coordinates: 35°30′28″N 35°47′45″E

The Latakia camp (Arabic: مخيم اللاذقية), also known as Al-Raml camp, is an "unofficial" Palestinian refugee camp located within the municipal boundaries of Latakia on the Mediterranean coast of Syria. Established in 1955–1956 on an area of 220,000 square meters, most of the refugees originate from the city of Jaffa and villages in northern Palestine. As of June 2002, the number of registered refugees living in Latakia camp is 6,354.

Fishing provides a small income for many refugees. Work as casual labourers in the port and seasonal employment in the tourism sector are also common.

The United Nations Relief and Works Agency (UNRWA) is working on rehabilitating shelters and upgrading the sewage system in the camp. UNRWA operates four schools in the camp and constructed a women's programme center with contributions from the government of Germany in 1997 and a new school with contributions from the government of the United States of America in 2001.

== 2011 Syrian government attack ==
On August 15, 2011, during the Siege of Latakia the camp was shelled by Syrian government forces, forcing residents to flee.
