= Private University of Science and Arts =

The Private University of Science and Arts (P.U.S.A) was a private university in Aleppo, Syria, established in 2003. It has two faculties: Architecture and Fine Arts.

The university was the first private university to open in Syria when permissions were granted. It offered tuition matched with Aleppo's Public University's curriculum in addition to visiting professors and tutors from other countries, bringing the best of local and foreign expertise to its students, and offering them ongoing links with Italian universities.

The university closed doors after the political unrest in the country which affected Aleppo and the premises of P.U.S.A.
