= Al-Madina Souq =

Souq in Aleppo, Syria

Coordinates: 36°12′N 37°09′E

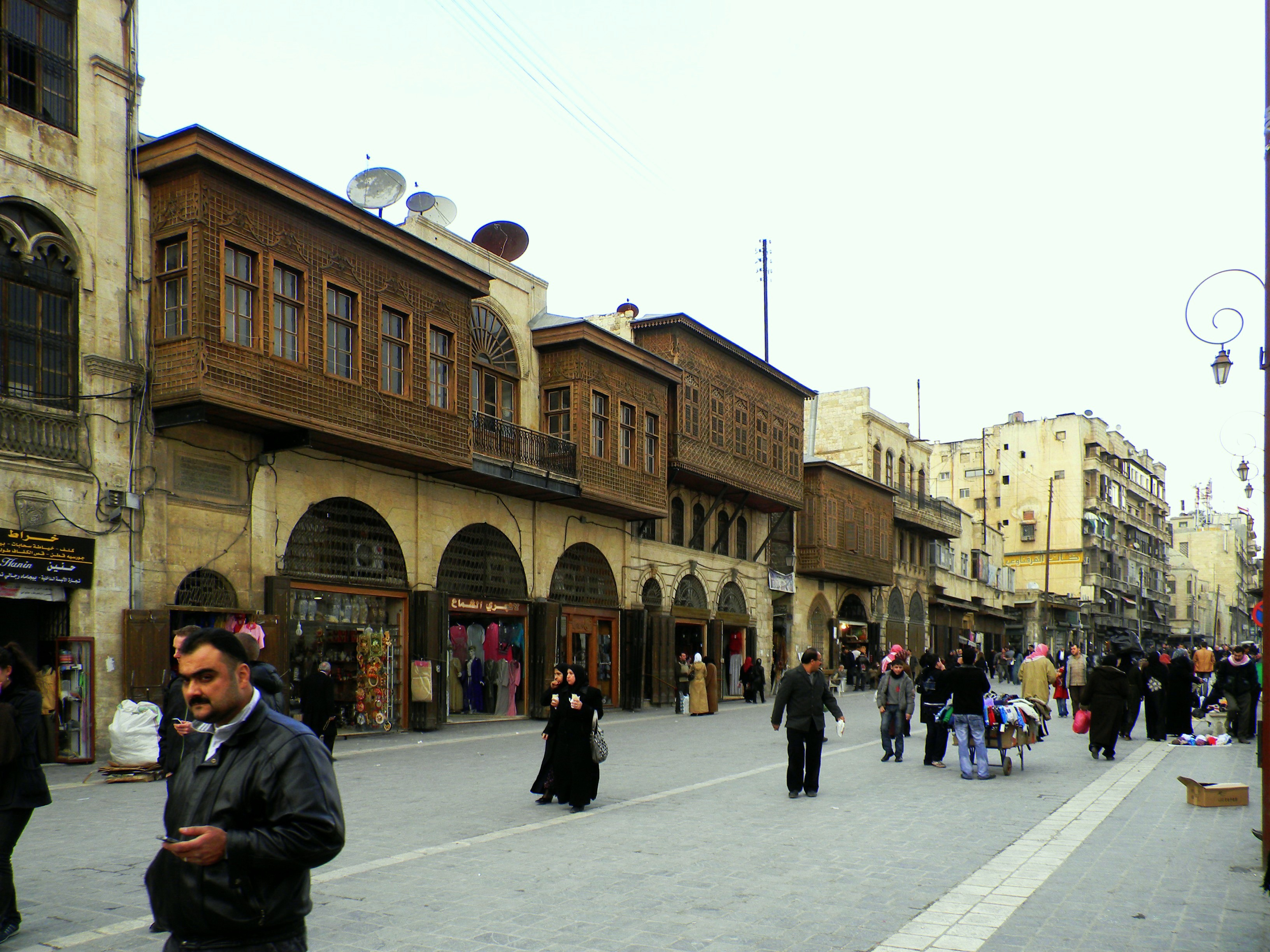
- The main road where al-Madina Souq is located on both sides
- Native name: سوق المدينة (Arabic)
- Location: Aleppo, Syria

Construction
- Completion: 14th-century

Al-Madina Souq (Arabic: سوق المدينة, romanized: Sūq al-Madīna) is the covered souq-market located at the heart of the Syrian city of Aleppo within the walled ancient part of the city. With its long and narrow alleys, al-Madina Souq is the largest covered historic market in the world, with an approximate length of 13 kilometers. It is a major trade centre for imported luxury goods, such as raw silk from Iran, spices and dyes from India and many other products. Al-Madina Souq is also home to local products such as wool, agricultural products and soap. Most of the souqs date back to the 14th century and are named after various professions and crafts, hence the wool souq, the copper souq, and so on. Aside from trading, the souq accommodated the traders and their goods in khans (caravanserais) scattered within the souq. Other types of small market-places were called caeserias (قيساريات). Caeserias are smaller than khans in size and functioned as workshops for craftsmen. Most of the khans took their names after their function and location in the souq, and are characterized by beautiful façades and entrances with fortified wooden doors.

Al-Madina Souq is part of the Ancient City of Aleppo, a UNESCO World Heritage Site since 1986.

Many sections of the souq and other medieval buildings in the ancient city were destroyed, ruined or burnt as a result of fighting between the Syrian opposition and the Syrian Armed Forces beginning on 25 September 2012.

== Souqs and khans ==
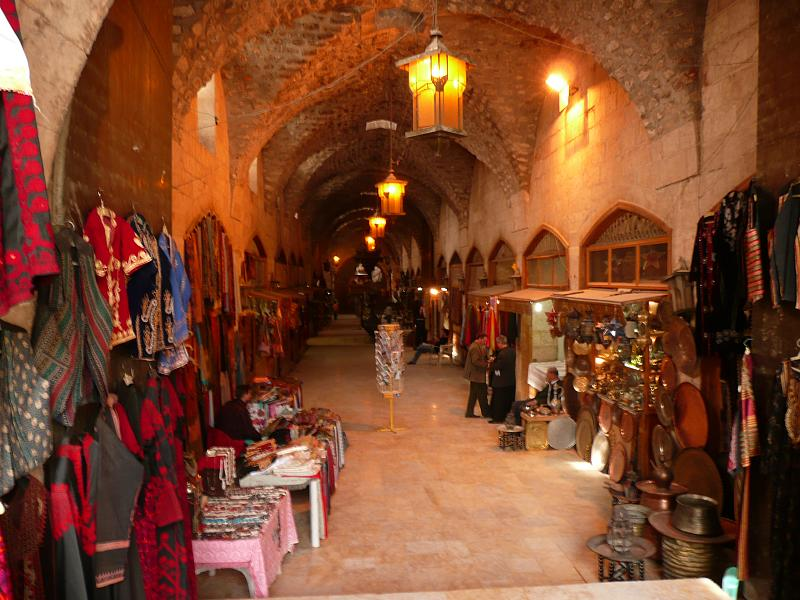
Khan al-Shouneh

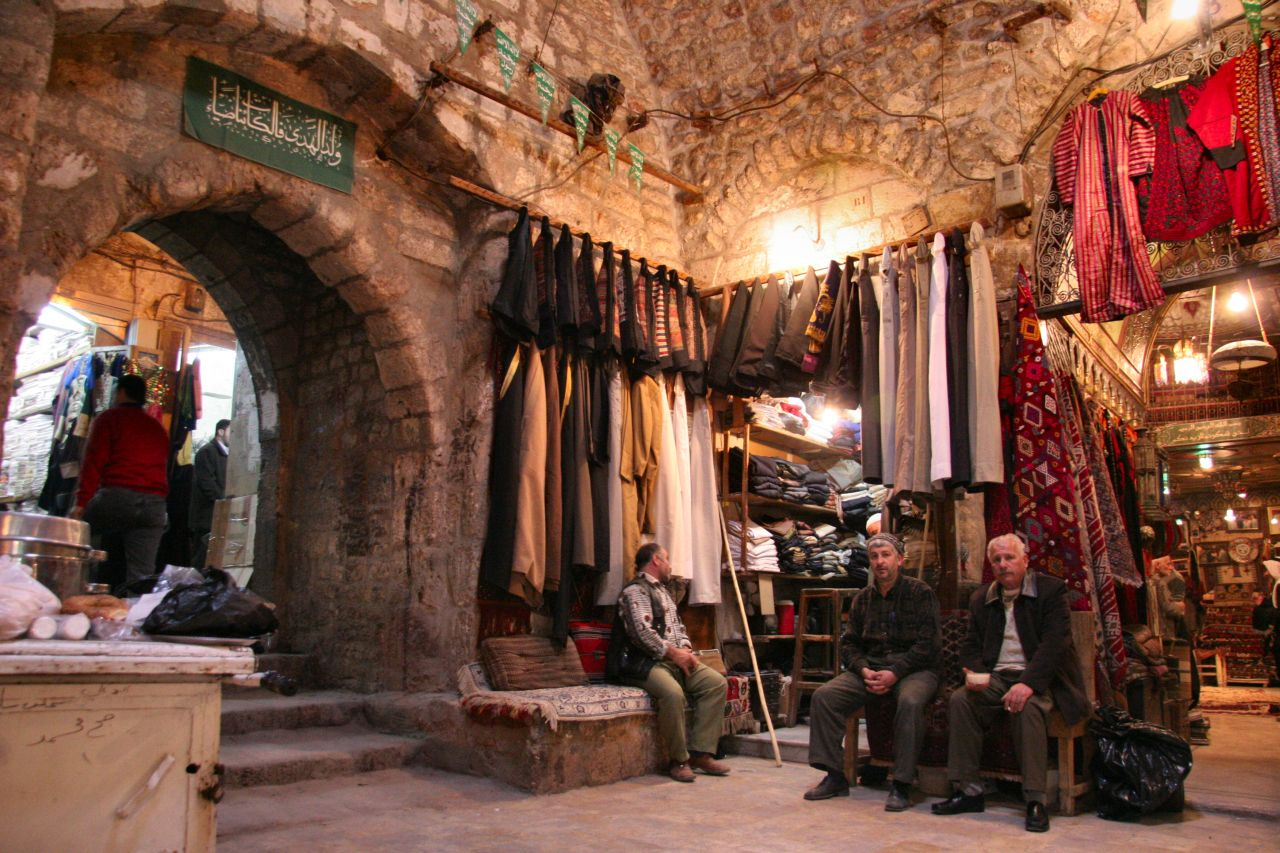
Souq al-Hiraj

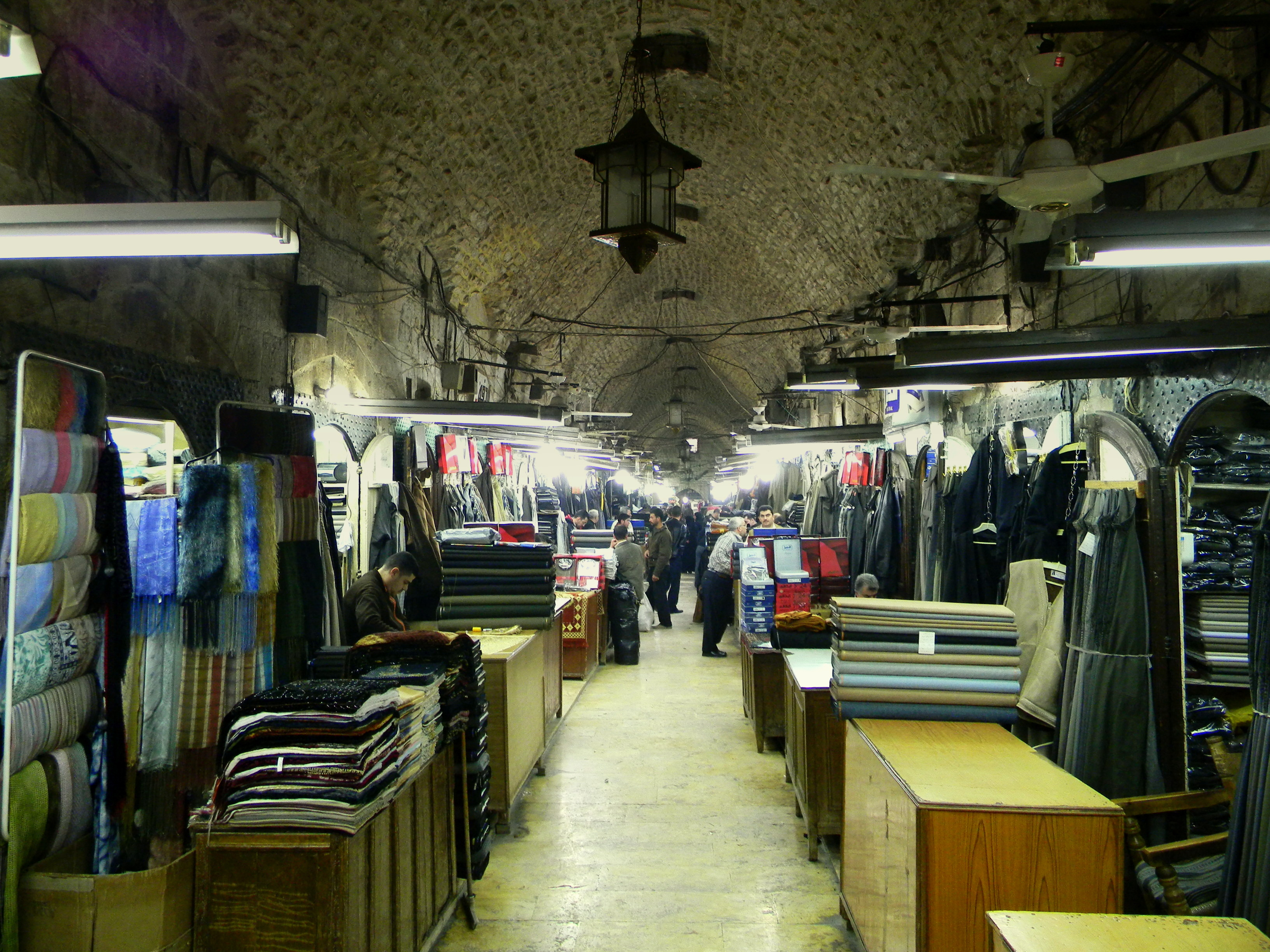
Souq al-Dira'

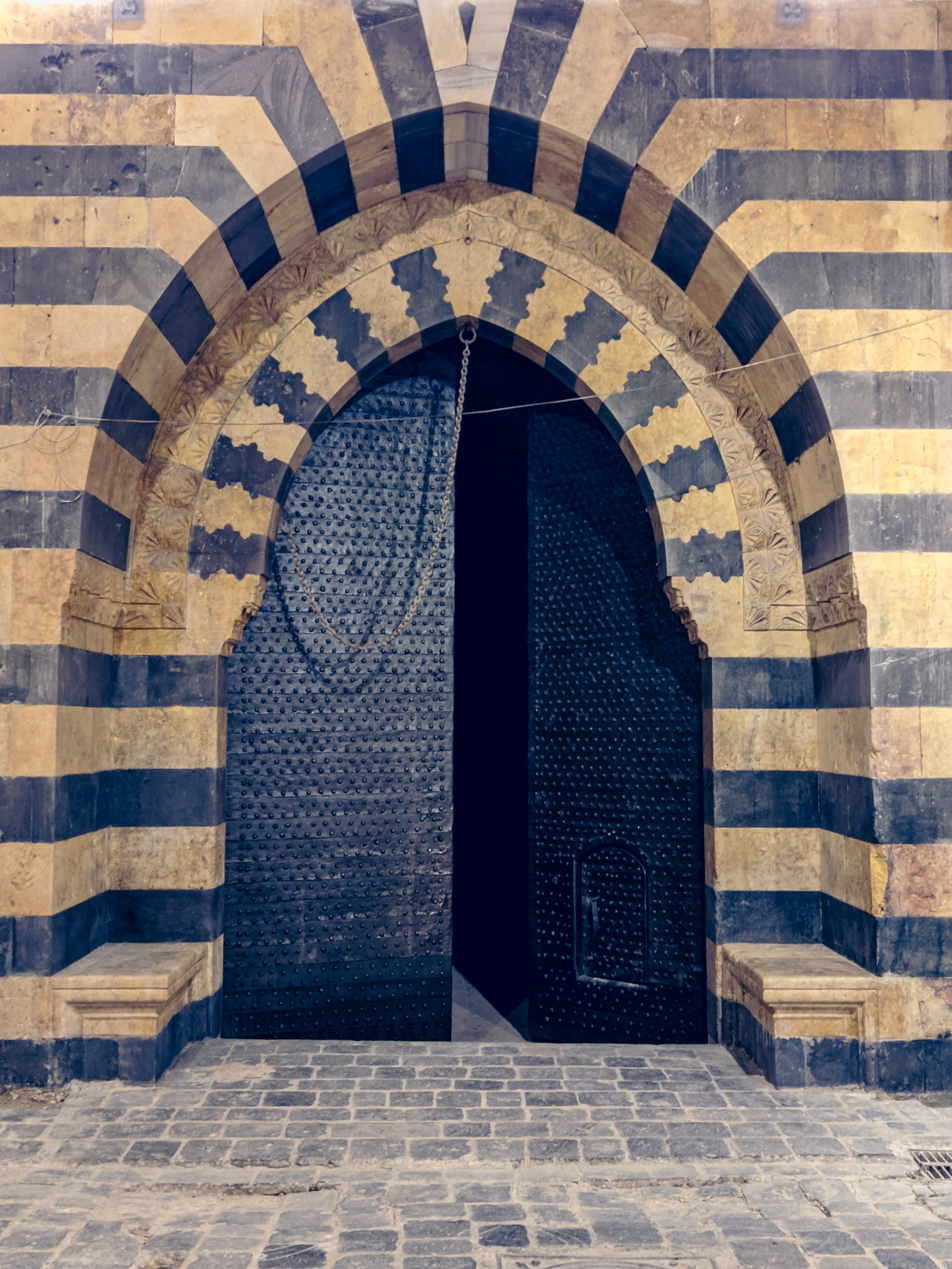
Gate of the souq Khan al-Harir after its reconstruction in 2020

The city's strategic trading position attracted settlers of all races and beliefs who wished to take advantage of the commercial roads that met in Aleppo from as far as China and Mesopotamia to the east, Europe to the west, and the Fertile Crescent and Egypt to the south.

The most significant souqs within and along the covered area of Souq al-Madina:

- Khan al-Qadi, one of the oldest khans in Aleppo, dating back to 1450.
- Khan al-Burghul (or bulgur), built in 1472, hosted the British general consulate of Aleppo until the beginning of the 20th century.
- Souq al-Saboun or the soap khan, built at the beginning of the 16th century. It is one of the main centres of Aleppo soap production.
- Souq Khan al-Nahhaseen or the coopery souq, built in 1539. It hosted the general consulate of Belgium during the 16th century. Nowadays it is known for its traditional and modern shoe shops, 84 of them.
- Khan al-Shouneh, built in 1546. Currently functions as a market for trades and traditional handicrafts of Aleppine art.
- Souq Khan al-Jumrok or the customs' khan, a textile trading centre with 55 stores. Built in 1574, Khan Al-Gumrok is considered to be the largest khan in ancient Aleppo.
- Souq Khan al-Wazir, built in 1682, believed to be the main souq for cotton products in Aleppo.
- Souq al-Farrayin or the fur market, is the main entrance to the souq from the south. The souq is home to 77 stores, mainly specializing in fur products.
- Souq al-Hiraj was traditionally the main market for firewood and charcoal. It currently has 33 stores, mainly dealing in rugs and carpets.
- Souq al-Dira', a large centre for tailoring and one of the most organized alleys in the souq with its 59 workshops.
- Souq al-Attareen or the herb market. Traditionally it was the main spice market of Aleppo. It is now a textile-selling centre with 82 stores but includes a few spice shops.
- Souq az-Zirb, originally known as Souq ad-Dharb, is the main entrance to the souq from the east. Was a place where coins were being struck during the Mamluk period. Nowadays the souq has 71 shops, most of them selling textiles and the basic needs of the Bedouins.
- Souq al-Behramiyeh, located near the Behramiyeh mosque, with 52 food shops.
- Souq Marcopoli (derived from the family name of Marcopoli, the hereditary Italian consuls in Aleppo), a center for textile trading with 29 stores.
- Souq al-Atiq or the old souq, specializing in raw leather, with 48 stores.
- Souq as-Siyyagh or the jewelry market is the main centre for jewelry shops in Aleppo and Syria with 99 stores located in 2 parallel alleys.
- The Venetians' Khan was home to the consul of Venice and the Venetian merchants.
- Souq an-Niswan or the women's market, the place where all necessary accessories, clothes and wedding equipment for the bride could be found.
- Souq Arslan Dada is one of the main entrances to the walled city from the north. With 33 stores, the souq is a centre for leather and textile trading.
- Souq al-Haddadin is one of the northern entrances to the old city. It is considered to be the old traditional blacksmiths' market with its 37 workshops.
- Souq Khan al-Harir or the silk khan is another entrance to the old city from the north. Built in the second half of the 16th century, the khan has 43 stores mainly specializing in textile trading. It hosted the Iranian consulate until 1919.
- Suweiqa (small souq in Arabic) consists of 2 long alleys: Sweiqat Ali and Suweiqat Hatem, in al-Farafira district, home to a group of khans and markets mainly specializing in home and kitchen equipment.

== Gallery ==
Al-Madina Souq

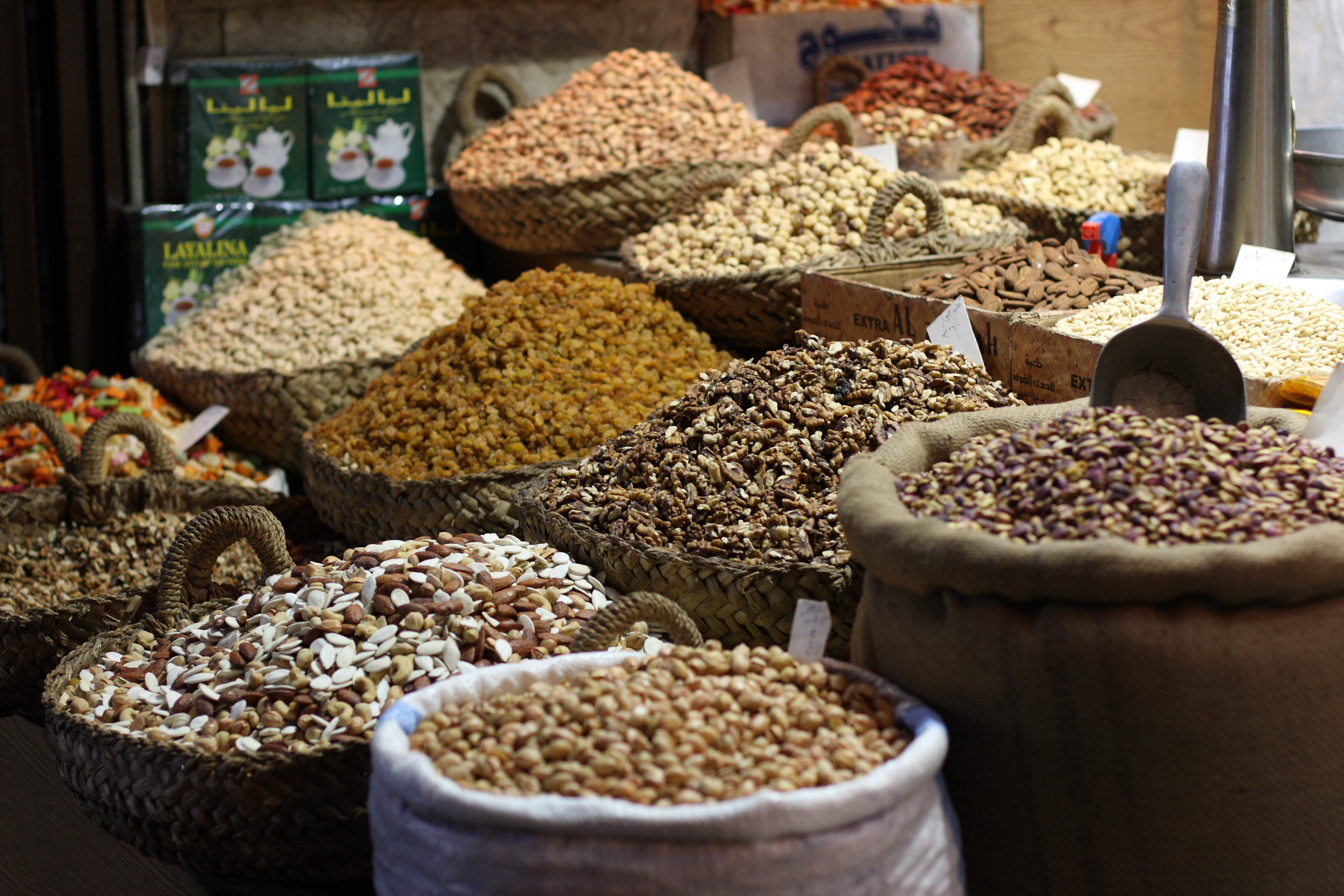
Souq al-Attareen

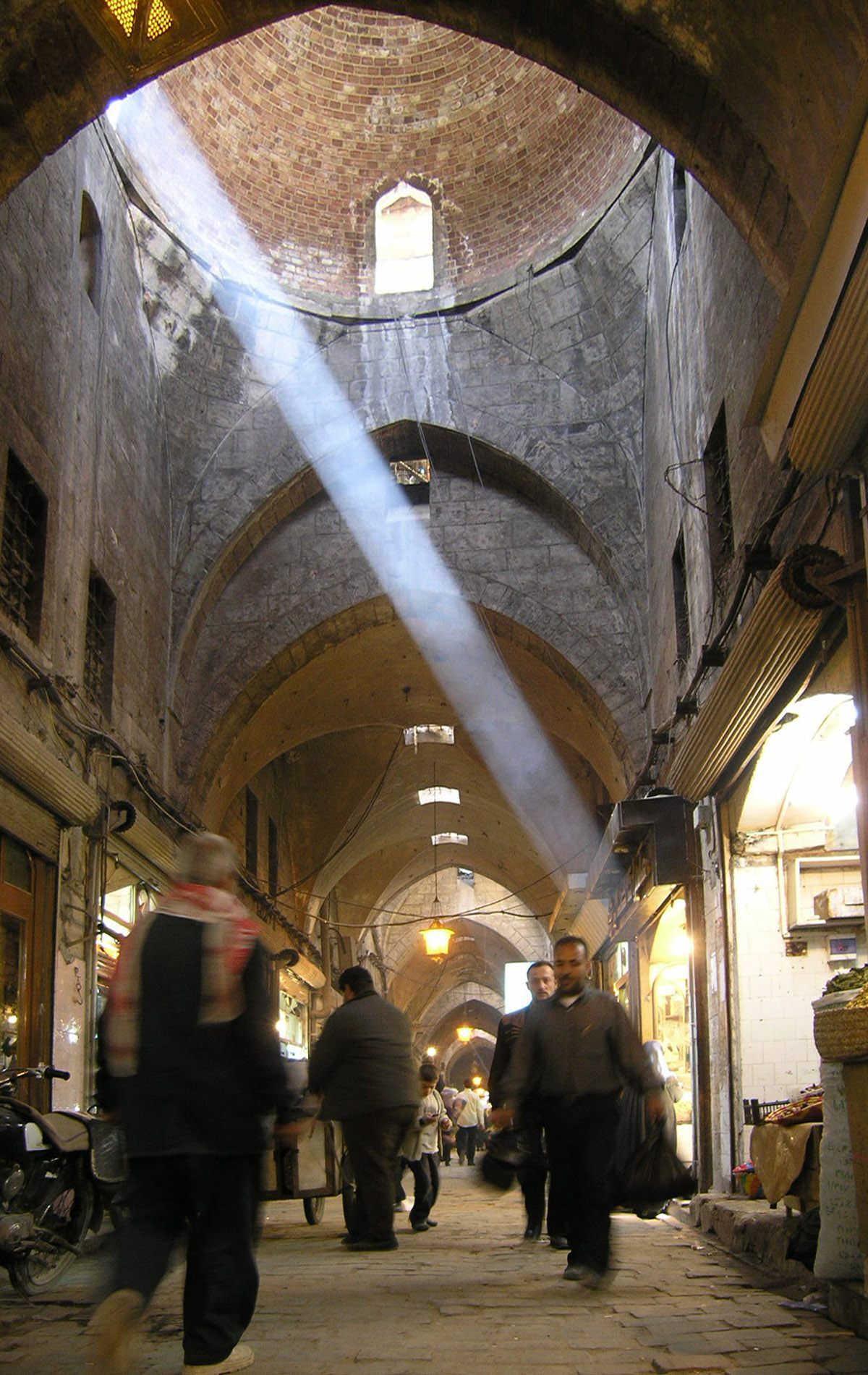
Souq al-Farrayin

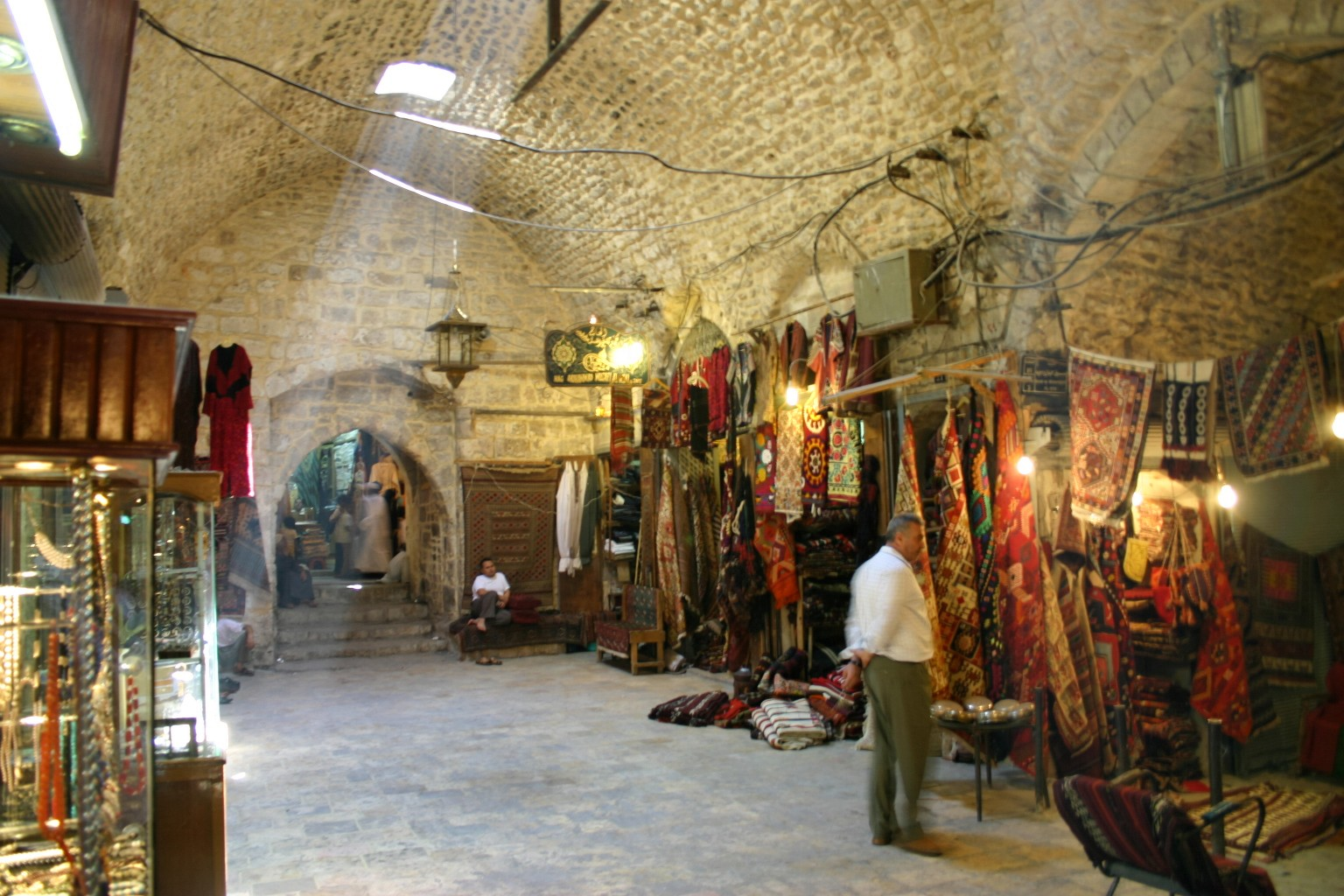
Souq al-Hiraj

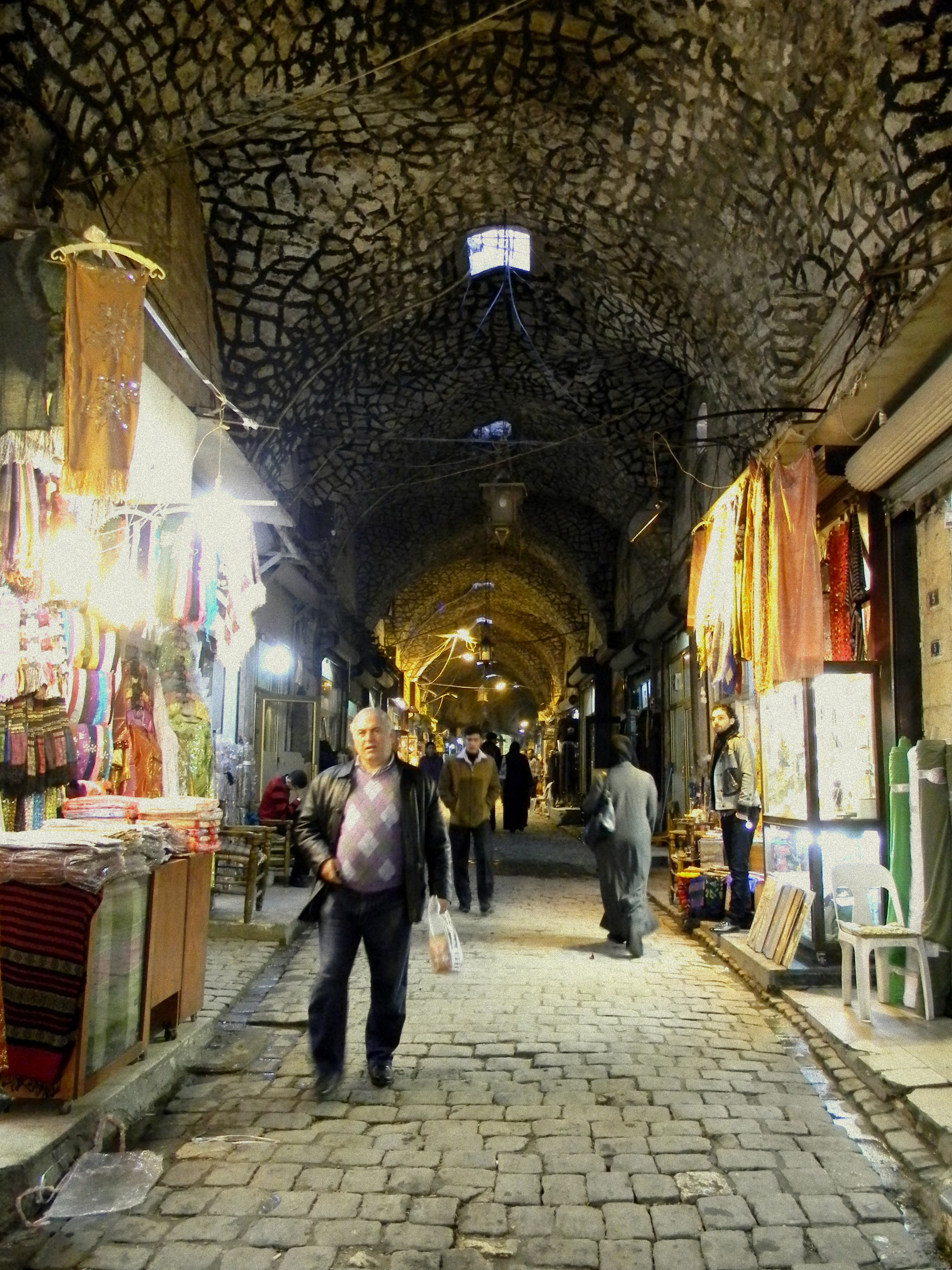
Souq al-'Atmah

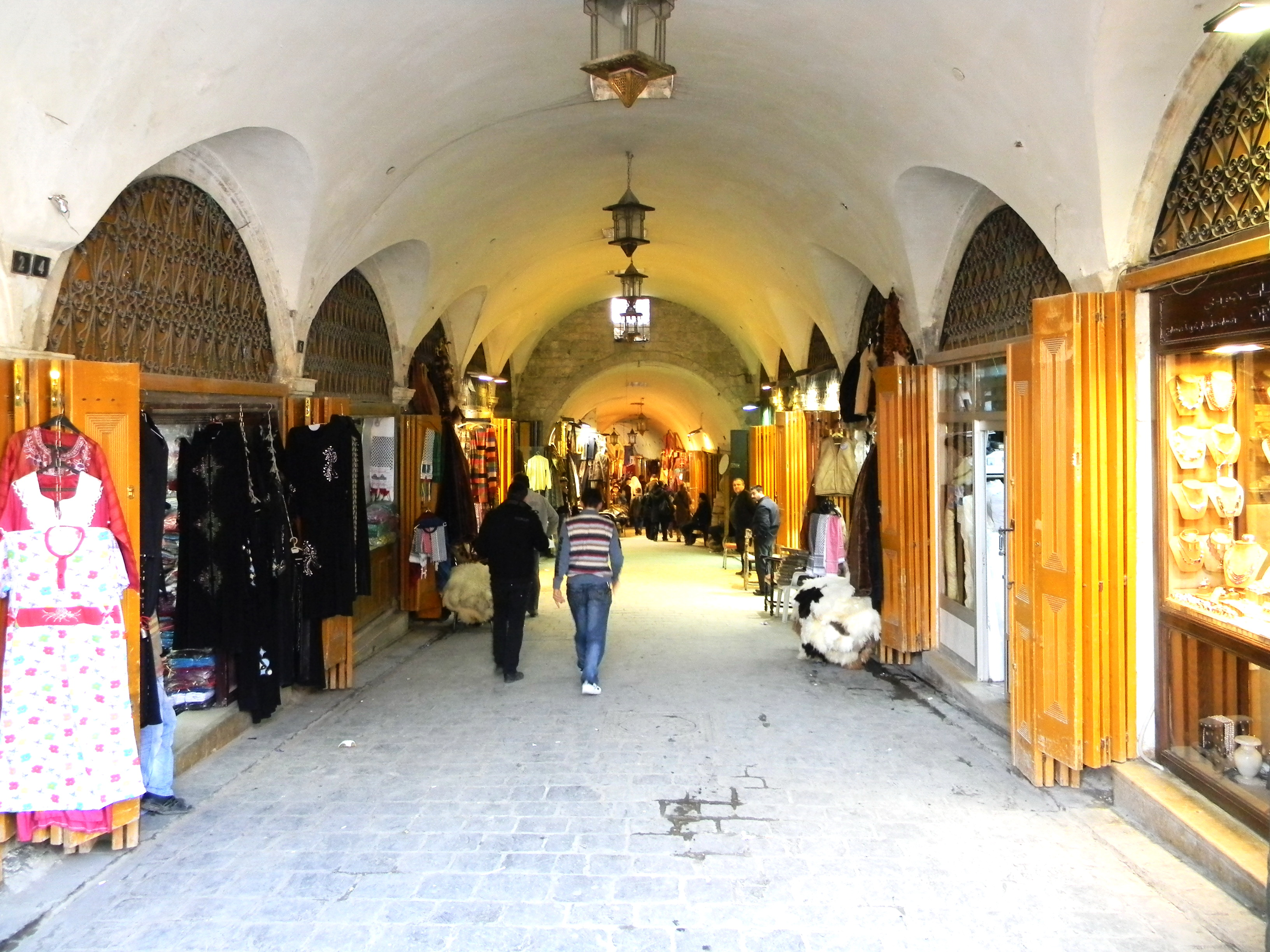
Souq az-Zirb

== See also ==
- Al-Hamidiyah Souq of Damascus
