= Aleppo Citadel Museum =

Museum in Aleppo, Syria

Aleppo Citadel Museum مَتْحَف قَلْعَة حَلَب
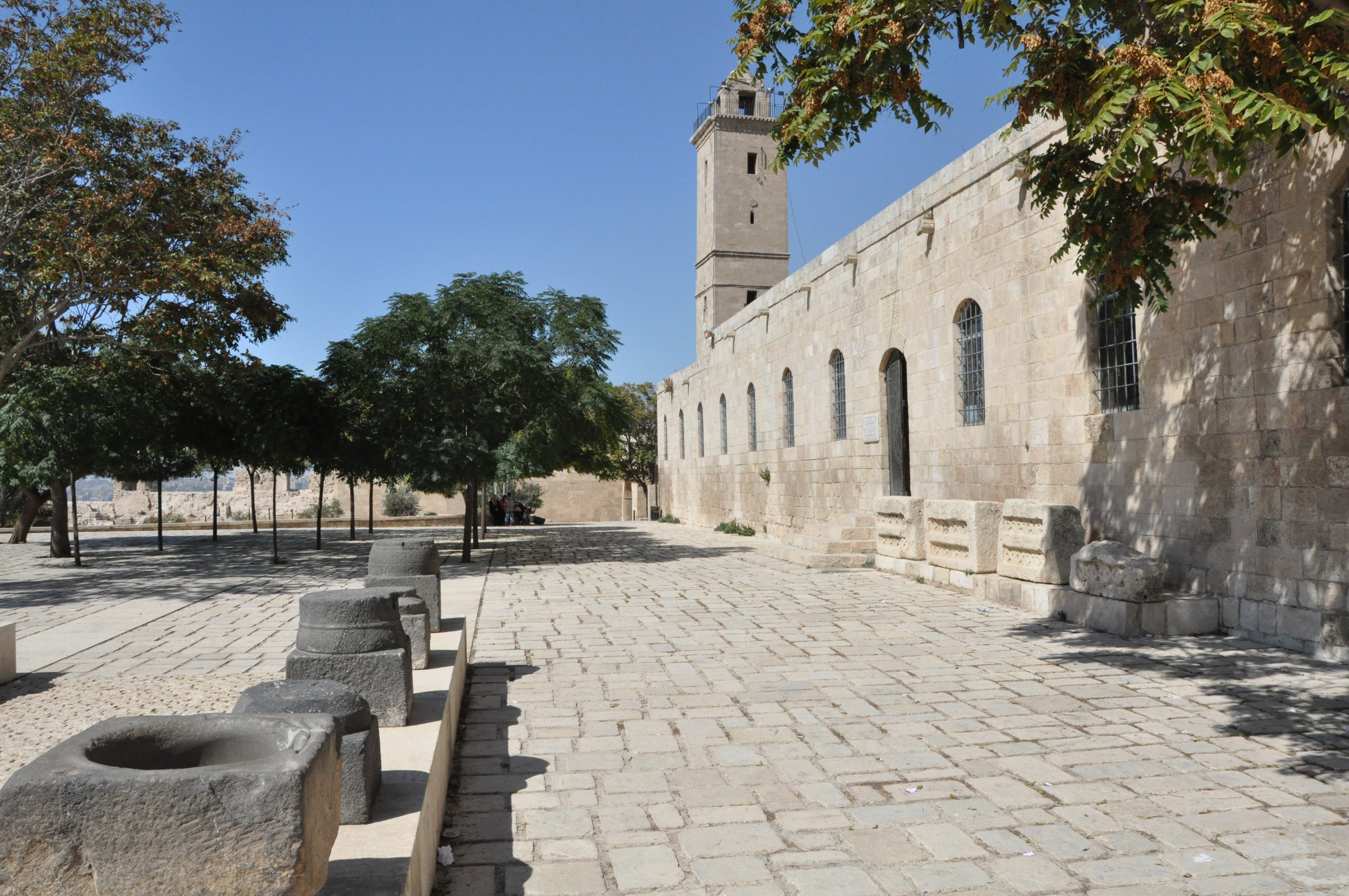
- Aleppo Citadel Museum

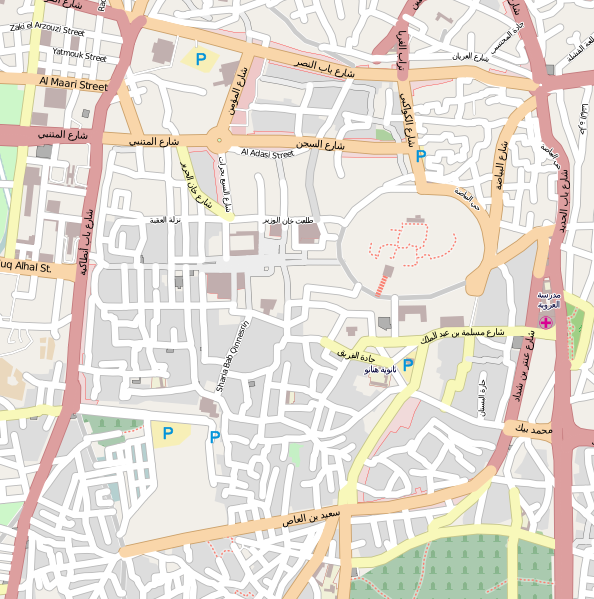
- Location in Ancient City of Aleppo
- Established: 1994
- Location: Citadel of Aleppo, Aleppo, Syria
- Coordinates: 36.2000°N 37.1630°E
- Type: Archaeological

The Aleppo Citadel Museum (Arabic: مَتْحَف قَلْعَة حَلَب, romanized: Matḥaf Qalʿat Ḥalab) is an archaeological museum located in the city of Aleppo, Syria, within the historic Citadel of Aleppo. It was opened in 1994 in the building of Ibrahim Pasha military barracks of the citadel, built in 1834. It occupies an area of 754 m² at the northern part of the citadel. The museum is home to many archaeological remains found in the citadel and belong to ancient civilizations.

== Background ==
In 1994, the building was entirely renovated by the Aleppo Directorate of Antiquities and Museums, with the assistance of the Aga Khan Cultural Services. The museum was opened on 26 September 1994 with the presence of then-minister of culture Najah al-Attar.

== History ==
The building of Ibrahim Pasha military barracks was built in 1834 by the Egyptian wāli Ibrahim Pasha, after his successful campaign in Syria against the rule of the Ottoman Empire.

The rectangular-shaped building (57 by 13 meters) is divided into three halls: the main exhibition hall is located at the centre of the building, occupying an area of 404 m². The other two halls (175 m² each) are located at the ends of the building.

The museum exhibits antiquities found during the excavations in the Citadel of Aleppo. The remnants of the museum date back to the early Syrian civilizations such as the Sumerians, Akkadians, Hittites, etc. There are also objects from the Roman and Arab Islamic periods.

A comprehensive restoration of the museum due to damage during the Battle of Aleppo began in 2021.

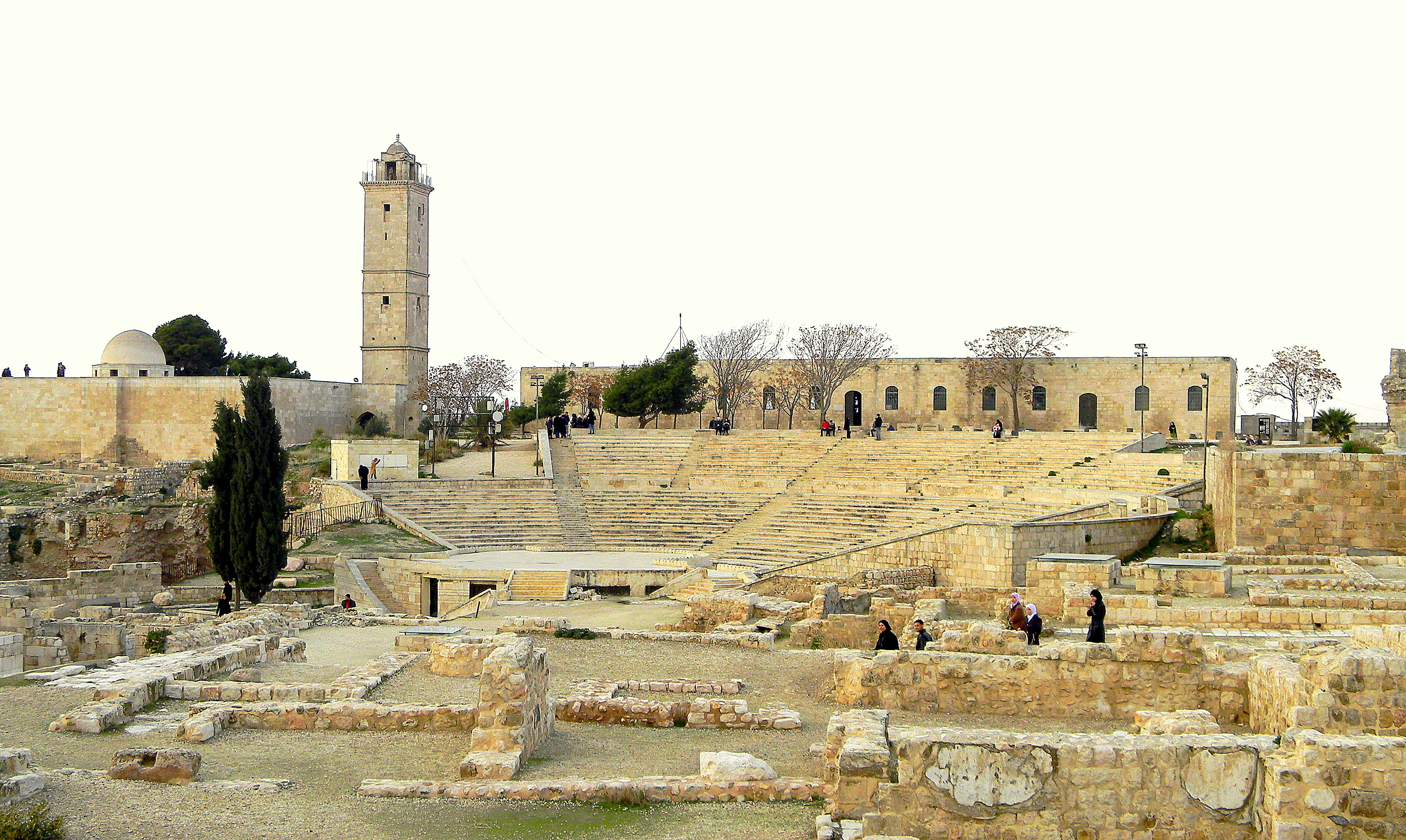
The citadel amphitheatre with the museum in the background

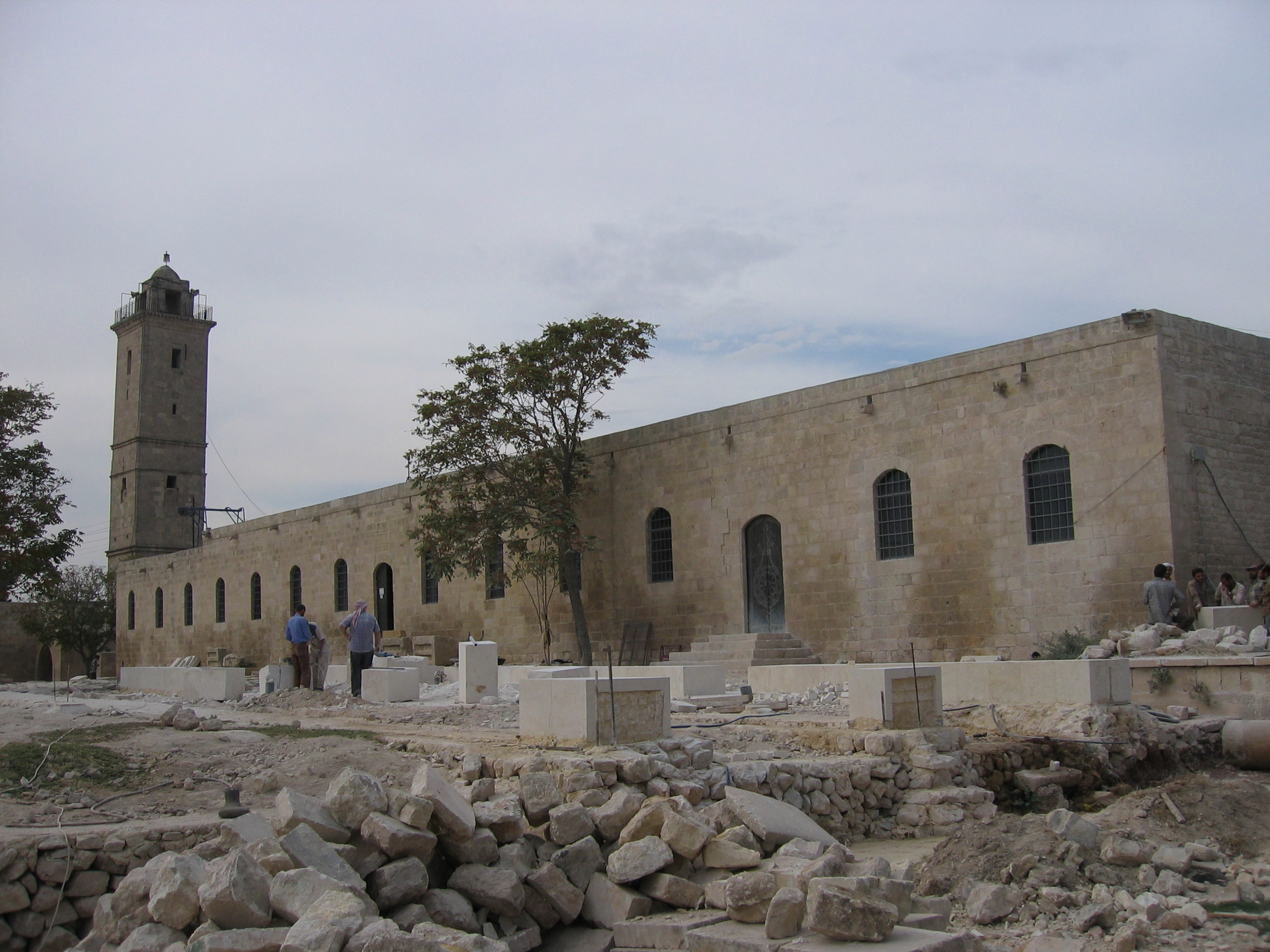
Renovation works in 2005
