= Hammam Yalbugha =

Coordinates: 36°11′51″N 37°09′49″E

- حمام يلبغا
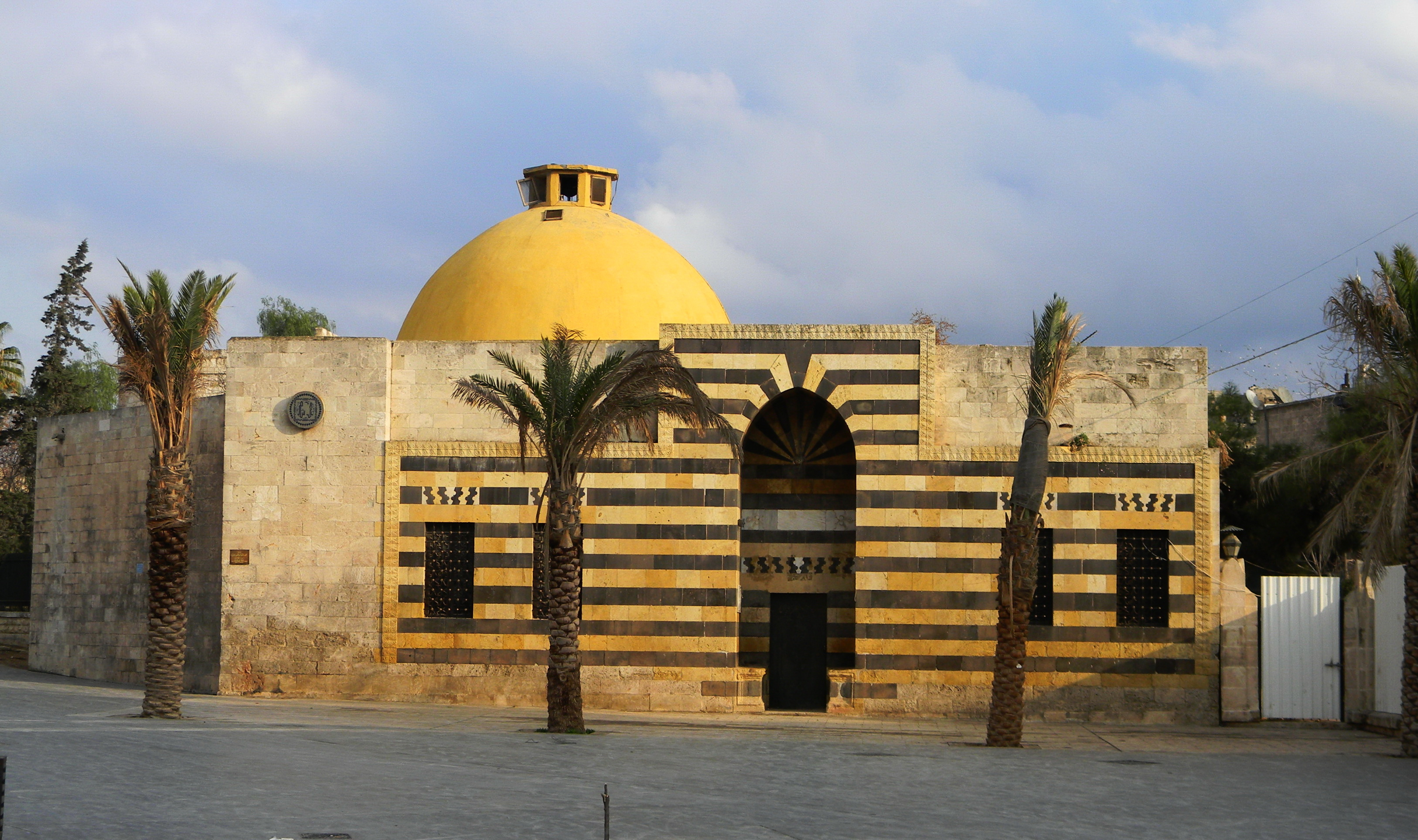
- Hammam Yalbugha al-Nasri before the war

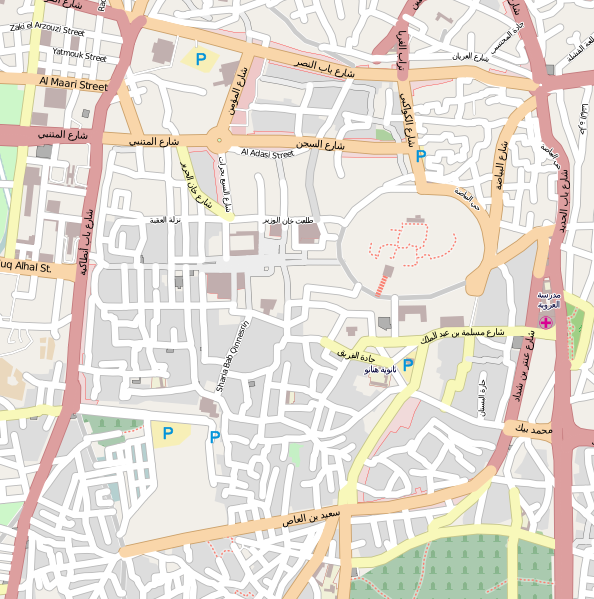
- Location within Ancient City of Aleppo
- Alternative names: Hammam Yalbugha al-Nasiri

General information
- Type: Hammam
- Architectural style: Mamluk
- Location: Aleppo, Syria
- Elevation: 400 metres (1,300 ft)
- Completed: 1491
- Renovated: 20 December 1985
- Renovation cost: ~1,041,000 USD
- Client: Saif ad-Din Yalbugha al-Nasiri
- Owner: Ministry of Tourism

Technical details
- Floor count: 1
- Floor area: 1,500 square metres (16,000 sq ft)

Renovating team
- Architect: Nabil Kassabji
- Other designers: Samir Nahhas

Hammam Yalbugha (Arabic: حمام يلبغا) is a Mamluk-era public bath ("hammam") in Aleppo, Syria. It was built in 1491 by the Emir of Alepo Saif ad-Din Yalbugha al-Naseri. It is located next to the entrance of the Citadel of Aleppo, on the banks of the Quweiq river.

The Hammam Yalbugha was damaged during the Syrian war.

== Interior (in 2001) ==
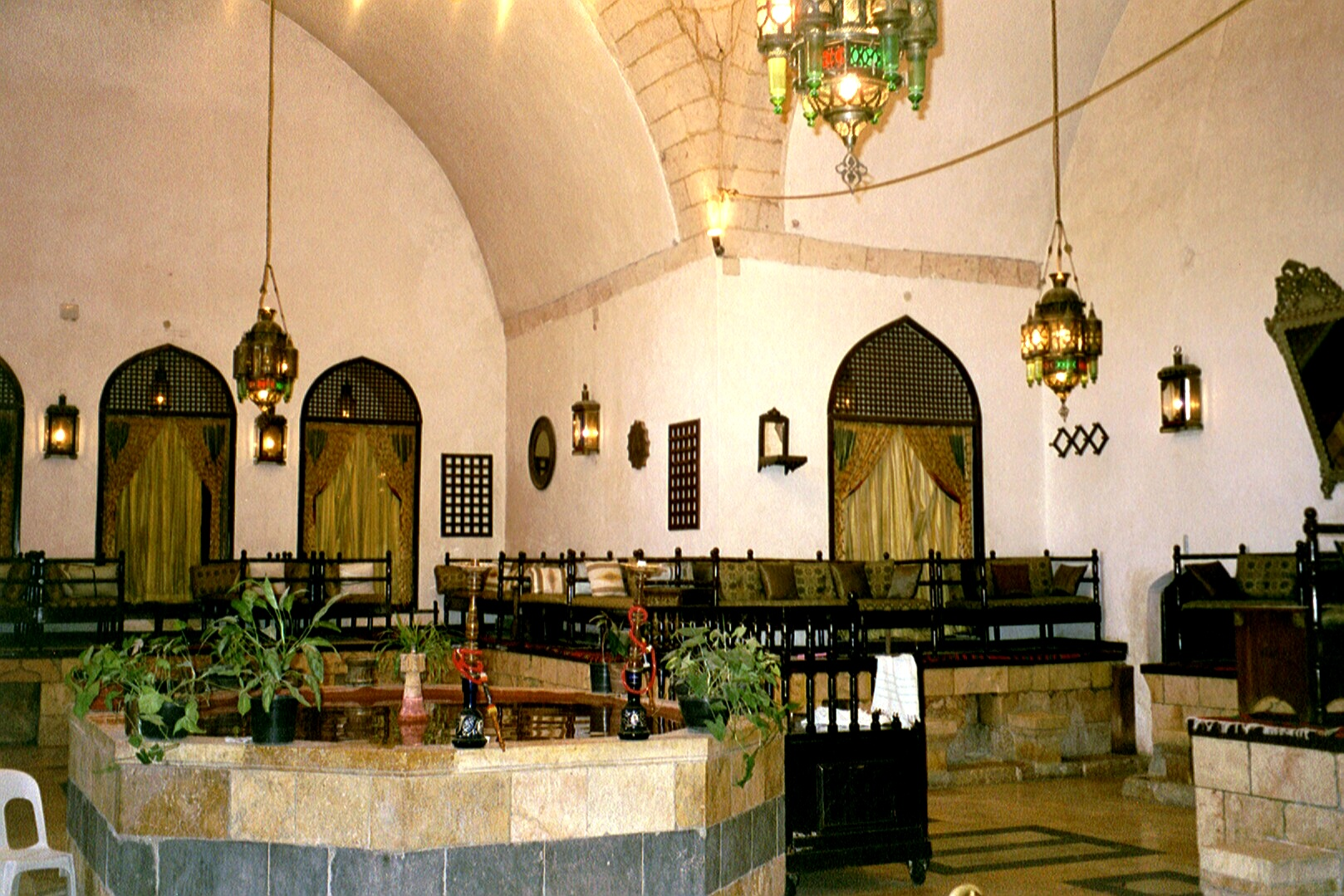

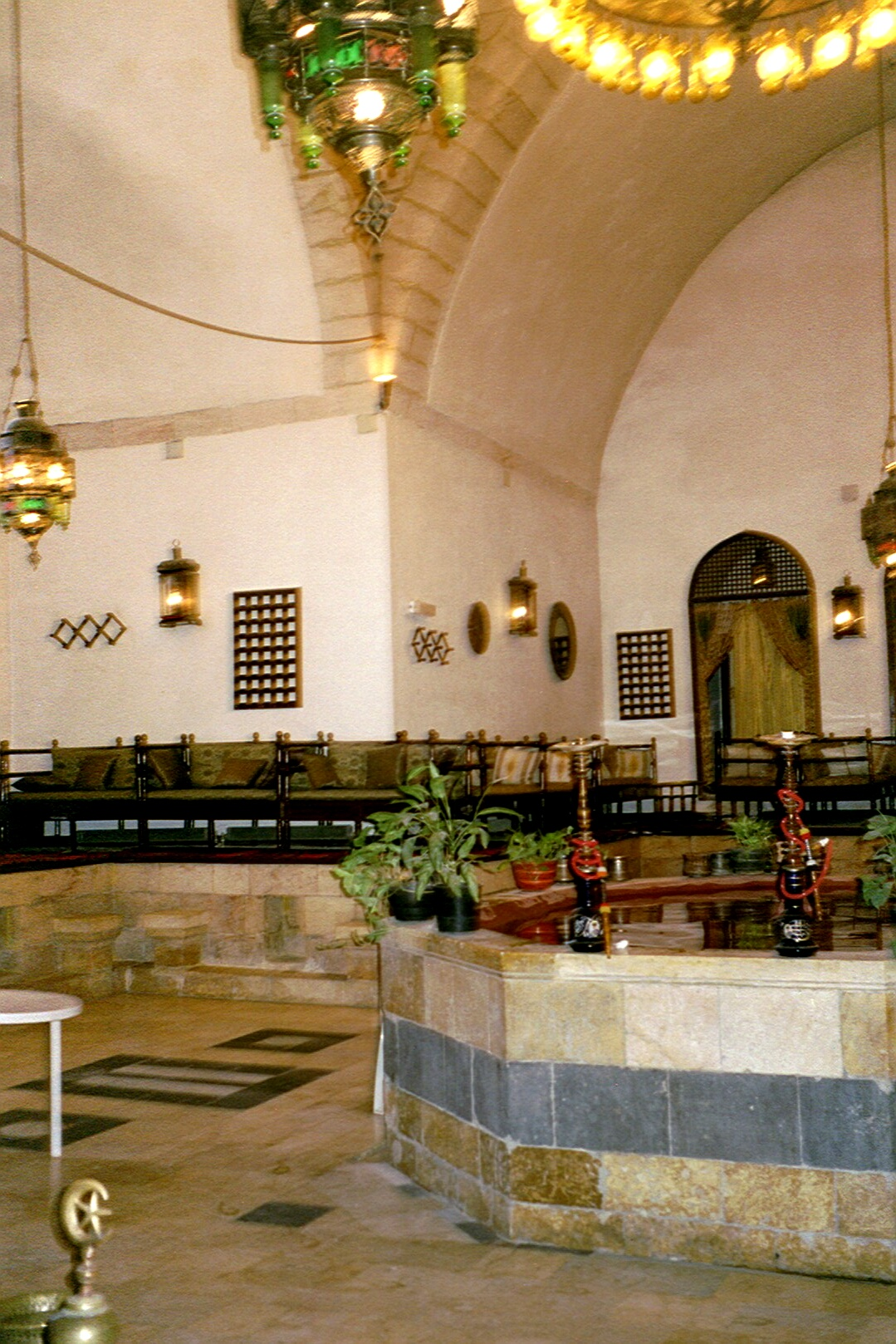

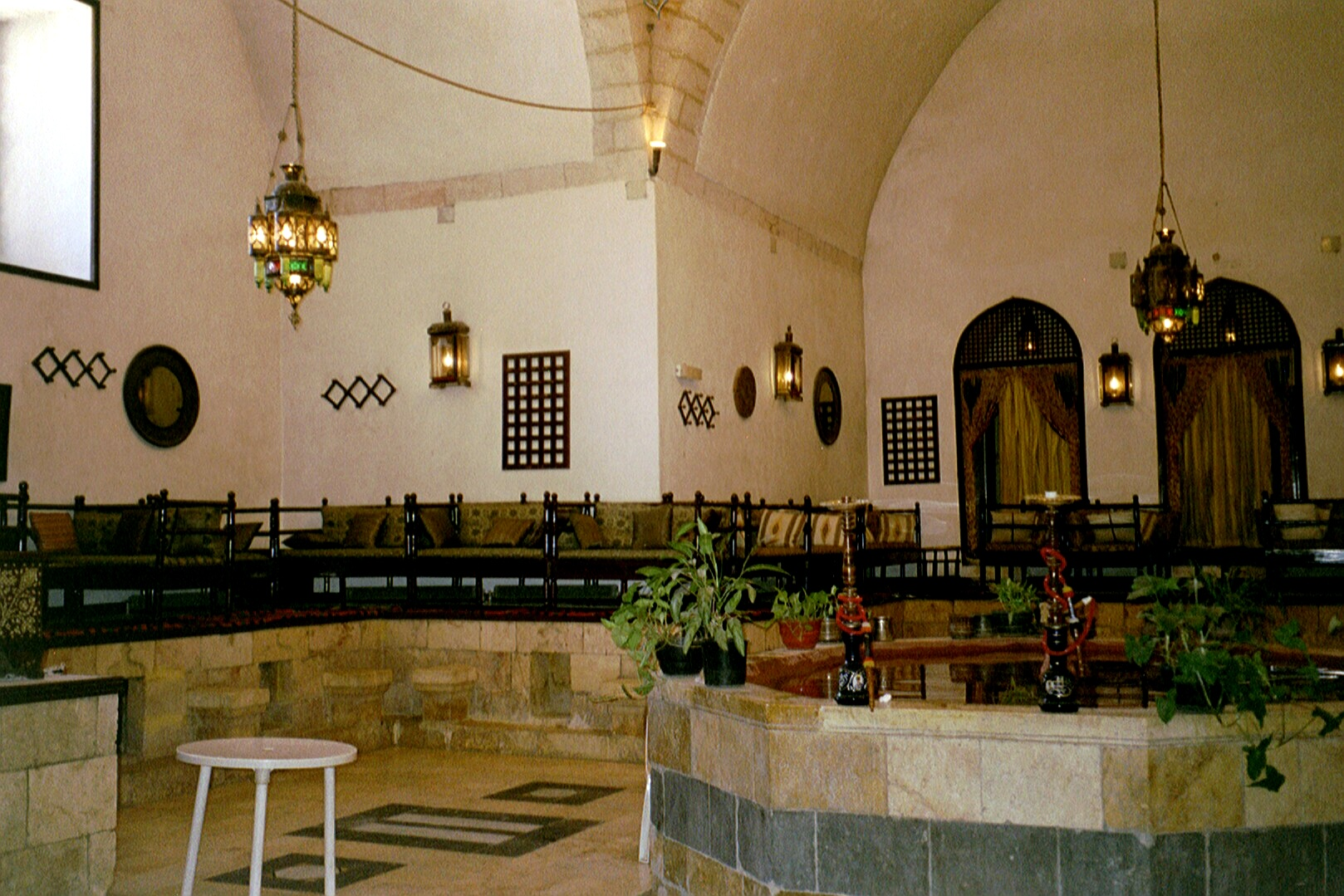

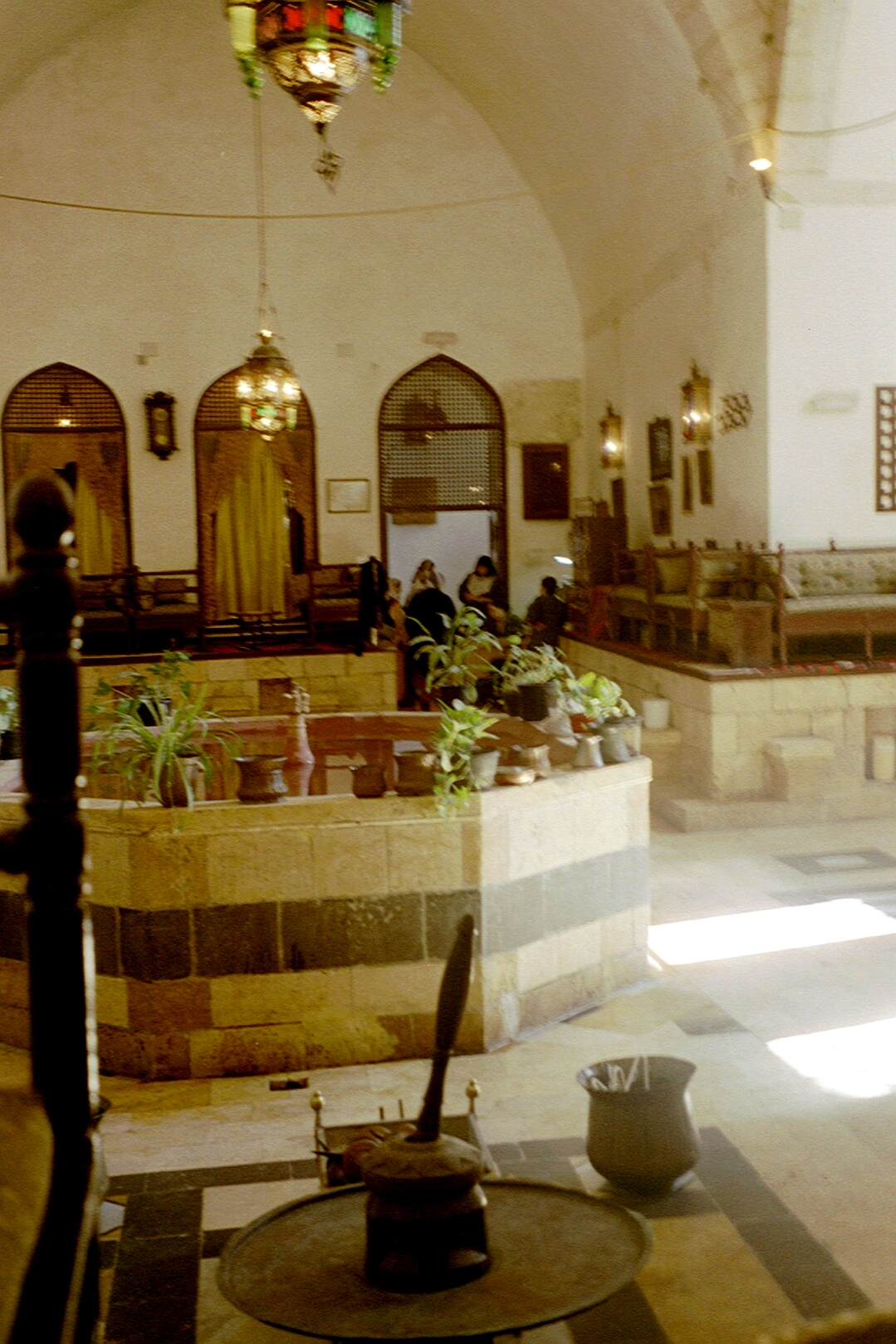

== See also ==
- Hammam Yalbugha al-Nasiri, archnet
- Yalbugha Baths Restoration, archnet
