= National Unity Brigades =

- كتائب الوحدة الوطنية; Kata'ib al-Wehda al-Watania
- Logo of the National Unity Brigades
- Leaders: Lieutenant Colonel Safi Abdel Karim; Captain Muhammad Tabnaja; Sergeant Muhammad Hammoud †; Ahmad Khdairu; Abdul Rahman Abdullah ("Abu Walid"); Hader Sheikh al-Shabab; Yusef Haj Yusef; Ali Haj Hassan; Abu Muhammad al-Maydani; Muhammad al-Hashish
- Dates active: August 2012 – mid-2014 (defunct)
- Allegiance: National Unity Movement
- Active regions: Syria: Idlib Governorate; Latakia Governorate; Hama Governorate; Rif Dimashq Governorate; Damascus Governorate; Suwayda Governorate
- Ideology: Syrian nationalism Democracy
- Size: "Few hundred" – 2,000
- Part of: (Syrian opposition) Free Syrian Army: Free Syria Front (May–December 2013)
- Wars: the Syrian Civil War

The National Unity Brigades (Arabic: كتائب الوحدة الوطنية; Kata'ib al-Wehda al-Watania) was an alliance of Syrian rebel groups that participated in the Syrian Civil War. The group was formed in August 2012. Known for its non-sectarianism, the group included rebels from minority groups such as Christians, Druze, Ismailis, and Alawites. The goal of the group was to establish a civil, democratic state for "all ethnicities and social identities".

== Member groups ==
Many of the units in the National Unity Brigades are named after Syrian nationalist and Syrian independence figures.

Subgroups in the Idlib and Latakia governorates

- Martyrs of Mount Wastani Brigade
  - Martyr Muhammad Sultan Battalion
  - Martyr Raed Sultan Battalion
  - Ansar Battalion
  - Free Detainees Battalion
- Martyrs of Janudia Battalion
- Martyrs of Bidama Brigade
- Free Men of Bidama Battalion
- Caliphate Brigade
  - Martyrs of Freedom Battalion
- Banners of the Revolution Battalion
- "We are all Syrians" Brigade
  - Hawks of Islam Battalion
  - Northern Storm Battalion
  - Loire Mountain Battalion
  - Swords of Islam Battalion

Subgroups in the Hama Governorate

- Martyrs of Salamiyah City Brigade
  - Yusuf al-'Azma Battalion
  - Fawzi al-Qawuqji Battalion
  - Rashid ad-Din Sinan Battalion
  - Salamiya Youth Battalion
- Martyr Yusuf al-'Azma Company

Subgroups in the Suwayda and Rif Dimashq governorates

- Yusuf al-'Azma Brigade
- Abd al-Rahman Shahbandar Brigade
- Martyr Tamer al-Awam Battalion
- Martyrs of the Syrian Revolution Brigade
- Ahmad Maryoud Brigade
- Damascus Martyrs Brigade

== Structure, funding, external support, and relations with other groups ==
The first plans of forming the National Unity Brigades was discussed by rebels in June 2012. Some of the rebels in the group were former activists and protesters. They began to collect money, organized the units, and announced the formation of the group in August 2012. In October 2012, the National Unity Brigades rejected foreign political support. The group was a loose coalition instead of a unified group and it received funding from various rebel military councils in Syria. The group claimed to have good relations with all other rebel groups "without exception" and have fought in battles "side by side with Islamist and Jihadist brigades".

In January 2013, 200 fighters of the Ahfad al-Rasul Brigades on Mount Zawiya requested to join the National Unity Brigades. The request was denied due to the lack of sufficient resources such as ammunition for the group.

The group recognized the Supreme Military Council, although it originally did not receive any support from it. On 18 May 2013, the Free Syria Front was formed by SMC commander Colonel Qasim Saad al-Din. Many groups in the National Unity Brigades joined the Free Syria Front. By October 2013, the NUB became an "autonomous coalition" within the FSF.

In February 2013, the National Unity Brigades refused to cooperate with the al-Nusra Front. A fighter in the group stated that "al-Qaeda is hijacking the revolution". Tensions rose between the two groups on Mount Wastani in western Idlib. On 19 June 2013, al-Nusra Front fighters killed two civilians in the area. After this, 50 al-Nusra fighters attempted to enter a village west of Darkoush, but was stopped at a checkpoint manned by the Martyrs of Mount Wastani Brigade, part of the National Unity Brigades. Following this incident, 10 rebel groups on Mount Wastani formed a coalition against al-Nusra and forced them to withdraw from the area by October 2013:

- Martyrs of Mount Wastani Brigade
- Northern Countryside Brigade
- Free Men of Mount Wastani Brigade
- Ghufran Brigade
- Glories of Islam Brigade
- Ahbad al-Rasul Brigade
- Happy Martyrs Brigade
- Free Zawiya Brigade
- Free Battalion
- Jisr al-Shughur Military Council

In July 2014, the al-Nusra Front attacked the Martyrs of Mount Wastani Brigade near the mountain range, resulting in casualties from both sides.
