= Free Syrian Army =

Former opposing coalition in the Syrian Civil War

- الجيش السوري الحر
- Founding leader: Riad al-Asaad
- Leaders: Unified Leadership (2011–2015); Riad al-Asaad (29 July 2011 – 8 December 2012); Salim Idris (8 December 2012 – 16 February 2014); Abdul-Ilah al-Bashir al-Noeimi (16 February 2014 – October 2014); Ahmed Berri (July 2015 – mid-2015, supported by SMC, disputed by SNC); Abdelkarim al-Ahmed (July 2015 – mid-2015, supported by SNC, disputed by SMC)
- Leadership: Supreme Military Council (2012–2015)
- Dates active: 29 July 2011 – 2015 (central organization); 2015 – 2025 (decentralization of organization, ad hoc use of the FSA identity)
- Allegiance: Syrian National Coalition (2013-2017)
- Group: See section
- Ideology: Anti-Assadism; Anti-authoritarianism; Democracy (from 2013); Factions: Secular nationalism; Sunni Islamism; Syrian nationalism; Religious nationalism; Jihadism; Democratic confederalism
- Political position: Big tent
- Size: 25,000 (late 2011); 75,000 (mid-2012); 87,000 (May 2013); 35,000 (December 2015)
- Part of: Syrian Revolutionary Command Council (2014–15)
- Wars: Syrian Civil War

The Free Syrian Army (FSA; Arabic: الجيش السوري الحر, romanized: al-jaysh as-Sūrī al-ḥur) was a big-tent coalition of decentralized Syrian opposition rebel groups in the Syrian civil war founded on 29 July 2011 by Colonel Riad al-Asaad and six officers who defected from the Syrian Armed Forces. The officers announced that the immediate priority of the Free Syrian Army was to safeguard the lives of protestors and civilians from the deadly crackdown by Bashar al-Assad's security apparatus; with the ultimate goal of accomplishing the objectives of the Syrian revolution, namely, the end to the decades-long reign of the ruling al-Assad family. In late 2011, the FSA was the main Syrian military defectors group. Initially a formal military organization at its founding, its original command structure dissipated by 2016, and the FSA identity was later used by several different Syrian opposition groups.

The Free Syrian Army aimed to be "the military wing of the Syrian people's opposition to the regime", through armed operations and the encouragement of army defections. In 2012, military commanders and civilian leadership of the FSA issued a joint communique pledging to transition Syria towards a pluralistic, democratic republic, after forcing Assad out of power. As the Syrian Army is highly organized and well-armed, the Free Syrian Army adopted a military strategy of guerrilla tactics in the countryside and cities, with a tactical focus on armed action in the capital of Damascus. The campaign was not meant to hold territory, but rather to spread government forces and their logistical chains thin in battles for urban centers, cause attrition in the security forces, degrade morale, and destabilize the government.

The FSA considered itself to be the armed wing of the Syrian revolution and was able to mobilise the popular anger toward Bashar al-Assad into a successful insurgency. By waging guerilla warfare across the country, it enjoyed a string of successes against far better-equipped government forces. Assad's policy of ignoring protesters' demands alongside the regime's intensifying violence on civilians and protestors led to a full-blown civil war by 2012. The FSA initially pursued a strategy of quickly eliminating the regime's top leadership; successfully assassinating intelligence chief Assef Shawkat and Defence Minister Dawoud Rajiha in July 2012. In early 2012, Iran's IRGC launched a coordinated military campaign by sending tens of thousands of Khomeinist militants to prevent the collapse of the Syrian Arab Army; polarising the conflict along sectarian lines. After 2013, the FSA became affected by decreasing discipline, absence of a centralised political leadership, lack of substantial Western support, deteriorating supply of weapons, and diminishing funds; while rival Islamist militias emerged dominant in the armed opposition. Russian military intervention in 2015 ensured Assad's survival and halted the expansion of the FSA. A series of Russian and Iranian-backed counter-offensives launched by the regime in 2016 eroded the significant territorial gains made by the FSA and severely weakened its command structure.

After the Turkish military intervention in Syria in 2016, and as other countries began to scale back their involvement, many FSA militias became more dependent on Turkey, which became a sanctuary and source of supplies. From late August 2016, the Turkish government assembled a new coalition of Syrian rebel groups, including many that were in the FSA; the core of this new coalition was the Hawar Kilis Operations Room. Initially referred to as the Turkish-backed Free Syrian Army (TFSA), this force adopted the name Syrian National Army (SNA) in 2017. A majority of the FSA militias came under the command of the Syrian Interim Government; while the rest either allied with the Syrian Salvation Government, the Autonomous Administration of North and East Syria, or were in the Al-Tanf Deconfliction Zone.

In December 2024, after the fall of the Ba'athist-led regime, the founding leader of the FSA, Riad al-Asaad, returned to the Syrian capital of Damascus. He said that the Free Syrian Army (FSA) had been working closely with Islamist group Hayat Tahrir al-Sham (HTS), and he was later promoted to the role of Brigadier General as part of the new Syrian Army.

== Flags and coat of arms ==
Flags and coat of arms of the Free Syrian Army
The coat of arms of the FSA which incorporates the old coat of arms of Syria; used from July until November 2011.

The coat of arms of the FSA which incorporates the flag of the First Syrian Republic; used after November 2011.

The flag of Ba'athist Syria, used by the FSA until November 2011.

The flag of the First Syrian Republic, used by the FSA after November 2011.

== History ==
=== 2011 – formation ===
The first defections from the Syrian Army during the Syrian uprising may have occurred at the end of April 2011 when the army was sent into Daraa to quell ongoing protests. There were reports that some units refused to fire on protesters and had split from the army.

Defections, according to unverified reports, continued throughout the spring as the government used lethal force to clamp down on protesters and lay siege to protesting cities across the country, such as Baniyas, Hama, Talkalakh, and Deir ez-Zor, and there were reports of soldiers who refused to fire on civilians being summarily executed by the army.

At the end of July 2011, with the uprising running since March 2011 and turning into a full-scale civil war, a group of defected Syrian Army officers established the 'Free Syrian Army' to bring down the Assad government. On 29 July 2011, Colonel Riad al-Asaad and a group of uniformed officers announced the formation of the Free Syrian Army or 'Syrian Free Army', with the goals of protecting unarmed protesters and helping to "bring down this regime", in a video on the Internet where Riad al-Asaad spoke alongside several other defectors.

Paying homage to the victims killed by the "criminal gangs" of regime's apparatus, Riad Al-Asaad declared the formation of Free Syrian Army:

"Proceeding from our nationalistic sense, our loyalty to this people, our sense of the current need for conclusive decisions to stop this regime's massacres that cannot be tolerated any longer, and proceeding from the army's responsibility to protect this unarmed free people, we announce the formation of the Free Syrian Army to work hand in hand with the people to achieve freedom and dignity to bring this regime down, protect the revolution and the country's resources, and stand in the face of the irresponsible military machine that protects the regime."

He called on the officers and men of the Syrian army to "defect from the army, stop pointing their rifles at their people's chests, join the free army, and form a national army that can protect the revolution and all sections of the Syrian people with all their sects." He said that those soldiers and officers who didn't defect from the Syrian army "[represents] gangs that protect the regime", and declared that "as of now, the security forces that kill civilians and besiege cities will be treated as legitimate targets. We will target them in all parts of the Syrian territories without exception"; "you will find us everywhere at all times, and you will see that which you do not expect, until we re-establish the rights and freedom of our people." Riad al-Assad urged all factions of the Syrian opposition to unite and put an end to internal disputes; until liberation from the dictatorship and formation of a "free, national, democratic" civilian government in Syria.

=== Defectors from the Syrian Arab Army ===
Desertion of soldiers to the Free Syrian Army was documented in videos. On 23 September 2011, the Free Syrian Army merged with the Free Officers Movement (Arabic: حركة الضباط الأحرار, Ḥarakat aḑ-Ḑubbāṭ al-Aḥrār); The Wall Street Journal considered the FSA since then the main military defectors group.

From 27 September to 1 October, Syrian government forces, backed by tanks and helicopters, led a major offensive on the city of Rastan in Homs province, which had been under opposition control for a couple weeks. There were reports of large numbers of defections in the city, and the Free Syrian Army reported it had destroyed 17 armoured vehicles during clashes in Rastan, using RPGs and booby traps. A defected officer in the Syrian opposition claimed that over a hundred officers had defected as well as thousands of conscripts, although many had gone into hiding or home to their families, rather than fighting the loyalist forces. The Battle of Rastan between the government forces and the Free Syrian Army was the longest and most intense action up until that time. After a week of fighting, the FSA was forced to retreat from Rastan. To avoid government forces, the leader of the FSA, Col. Riad Asaad, retreated to the Turkish side of Syrian-Turkish border.

By October 2011, the leadership of the FSA consisting of 60–70 people including commander Riad al-Assad was harbored in an 'officers' camp' in Turkey guarded by the Turkish military. In early November 2011, two FSA units in the Damascus area confronted regime forces. In mid-November, in an effort to weaken the pro-Assad forces, the FSA released a statement which announced that a temporary military council had been formed.

In October 2011, an American official said the Syrian military might have lost perhaps 10,000 to defections. By October, the FSA would start to receive military support from Turkey, who allowed the rebel army to operate its command and headquarters from the country's southern Hatay province close to the Syrian border, and its field command from inside Syria. The FSA would often launch attacks into Syria's northern towns and cities, while using the Turkish side of the border as a safe zone and supply route.

By the beginning of October, clashes between loyalist and defected army units were being reported fairly regularly. During the first week of the month, sustained clashes were reported in Jabal al-Zawiya in the mountainous regions of Idlib province. On 13 October, clashes were reported in the town of Haara in Daraa province in the south of Syria that resulted in the death of two rebel and six loyalist soldiers, according to the London-based Syrian Observatory for Human Rights. Clashes were also reported in the city of Binnish in Idlib province with a total of 14 fatalities for both affected towns, including rebels, loyalists and civilians. A few days later on 17 October, five government troops were killed in the town of Qusayr in the central province of Homs, near the border with Lebanon, and 17 people were reported wounded in skirmishes with defectors in the town of Hass in Idlib province near the mountain range of Jabal al-Zawiya, although it was unclear if the wounded included civilians. According to the London-based organization, an estimated 11 government soldiers were killed that day, four of which were killed in a bombing. It was not clear if the defectors linked to these incidents were connected to the Free Syrian Army.

On 20 October, the opposition reported that clashes occurred between loyalists and defectors in Burhaniya, near the town of Qusayr in the central province of Homs, leading to the death of several soldiers and the destruction of two military vehicles. A week later on 25 October, clashes occurred in the northwestern town of Maarat al-Numaan in Idlib province between loyalists and defected soldiers at a roadblock on the edge of the town. The defectors launched an assault on the government held roadblock in retaliation for a raid on their positions the previous night. The next day on 26 October, the opposition reported that nine soldiers were killed by a rocket-propelled grenade when it hit their bus in the village of Hamrat, near the city of Hama. The gunmen who attacked the bus were believed to be defected soldiers.

On 29 October, the opposition reported that 17 pro-Assad soldiers were killed in the city of Homs during fighting with suspected army deserters, including a defected senior official who was aiding the rebel soldiers. Two armoured personnel carriers were disabled in the fighting. Later the number of casualties was revised to 20 killed and 53 wounded soldiers in clashes with presumed army deserters, according to Agence France Presse. In a separate incident, 10 security agents and a deserter were killed in a bus ambush near the Turkish border, opposition activists reported. The Syrian Observatory of Human Rights reported that the bus was transporting security agents between the villages of Al-Habit and Kafr Nabudah in Idlib province when it was ambushed "by armed men, probably deserters".

In November 2011, the FSA operated throughout Syria, both in urban areas and countryside, in the northwest of Syria (Idlib and Aleppo Governorates), the central region (Homs and Hama Governorates, Al-Rastan District), the coast around Latakia, the south (Daraa Governorate and the Houran plateau), the east (Deir ez-Zor Governorate, Abu Kamal District), and the Damascus Governorate. FSA was then armed with rifles, light and heavy machine guns, rocket-propelled grenades and explosive devices. Their largest concentrations were in Homs, Hama and surrounding areas.

The FSA, after consultation with the Syrian National Council (SNC) in November 2011, agreed to not attack Syrian army units that are staying in their barracks, and concentrate on protecting and defending civilians.

In November 2011, "The Free Syrian Army boasts it has as many 25,000 fighters in its ranks, a number challenged by its critics who say the true figure is closer to 1,000". early December, the US International Business Times stated that the FSA counted 15,000 ex-Syrian soldiers.

On 5 November, at least nine people died in clashes between soldiers, protesters and defectors, and four Shabeeha were killed in Idlib reportedly by army deserters. On the same day, the state-news agency SANA reported the deaths of 13 soldiers and policemen as a result of clashes with armed groups. According to SANA, four policemen were also wounded in clashes with an armed group in Kanakir in the Damascus countryside while one of the armed individuals died, additionally that day, two explosive devices were dismantled.

==== Defections and checkpoint raids ====
More army defections were reported in Damascus on 10 November, three out of at least nine defectors were shot dead by loyalist gunmen after abandoning their posts. The same day, clashes reportedly resulted in the death of a fifteen-year-old boy in Khan Sheikhoun, when he was caught in crossfire between Assad loyalists and the free army. Also on 10 November "at least four soldiers in the regular army were killed at dawn in an attack, headed by armed men – probably deserters – on a military checkpoint in Has region, near Maaret al-Numan town" according to the Syrian Observatory For Human Rights. However, the number has also been put at five soldiers. A checkpoint in Maarat al-Numaan three kilometers south of Homs also came under attack by defectors, resulting in an increase in tank deployment by Syrian security forces in the city.

In November, there were conflicting reports of the number of Syrian soldiers injured and killed. On 11 November, Reuters reported that 26 soldiers were killed, while Syrian state media reported the lower figure of 20 soldiers killed at this time. For the month up until 13 November, the Local Coordination Committees reported the death of about 20 soldiers, the Syrian Observatory of Human Rights reported the death of more than 100 soldiers, and the Syrian state media SANA reported the death of 71 soldiers. Increased Clashes in Daraa province began on 14 November when 34 soldiers and 12 defectors were killed in an ambush by the free army. The death toll as a result of the fighting also included 23 civilians. One day later on 15 November, eight soldiers and security forces troops were killed by an assault on a checkpoint in Hama province, according to activists.

==== Damascus intelligence complex attack ====
On 16 November, in a coordinated attack, an air force intelligence complex in the Damascus suburb of Harasta was attacked. According to the Free Syrian Army, they did so with machine guns and rocket-propelled grenades, leading to the death of at least six soldiers with twenty others wounded. A western diplomat said the assault was "hugely symbolic and tactically new". The attack on the air force intelligence complex was a continuation of clashes in Damascus. The next day, the Free Syrian Army launched an assault against the Baath party youth headquarters in Idlib province with RPGs and small arms. The state news agency SANA reported the deaths of three Syrian troops as a result of a bomb blast, with an officer also critically wounded and two law-enforcement agents injured. Three members of the security forces were reportedly killed on between 18 and 19 November by the Free Syrian Army. Multiple attacks on 19 December by armed groups were also reported by the state news agency SANA. State news also reported that ten wanted armed individuals were captured in Maarat al-Numan. On 23 November, five defected soldiers were killed; four in a farm near Daraa where they were hiding and one near the Lebanese border, according to Reuters.

According to Reuters, two rocket propelled grenades hit a Baath party building in Damascus on 20 December, which if confirmed would indicate the FSA had a greater reach than previously believed. However, an AFP reporter went to the area and saw no signs of the claimed attack while residents said that there had been no explosions.

==== Homs airbase attack ====
According to the Syrian Observatory for Human Rights, on 24 November soldiers and Shabiha with armoured vehicles started operations in farmland west of Rastan in Homs province to track down defectors. 24 people died as a result (if they were soldiers, defectors or civilians was not stated). At least fifty tanks and other armoured vehicle opened fire with 50 cal. machine guns and anti-aircraft weapons on positions held by the Free Syrian Army on Rastan's outskirts. Deaths were also reported in Daraa and Homs On 24 November 11 defectors were killed and four wounded during clashes on the western outskirts of Homs.

In an attack on an airbase in Homs province on 25 November, six elite pilots, one technical officer and three other personnel were killed. The Syrian government vowed to "cut every evil hand" of the attackers as a result. On that same day, at least 10 troops and security service agents were killed in clashes with mutinous soldiers in the east of Syria. The Syrian Observatory for Human Rights said the deaths occurred in Deir Ezzor, while early the next day a civilian was also killed in the eastern city. Several defectors were also killed or wounded.

==== Army convoy ambushes ====
Sustained clashes in Idlib province began on 26 November between loyalist and opposition fighters. At least 8 soldiers were killed and 40 more wounded that day when the free army attacked them in Idlib, the Syrian Observatory for Human Rights reported. "A group of deserters attacked a squad of soldiers and security agents in a convoy of seven vehicles, including three all-terrain vehicles, on the road from Ghadka to Maarat al-Numaan", the Britain-based watchdog said. "Eight were killed and at least 40 more were wounded. The deserters were able to withdraw without suffering any casualties," it added. The FSA claimed to be behind the attack.

Syrian human rights activists claimed that the Free Syrian Army had killed three loyalist soldiers and captured two others on 29 November, although they did not specify where. According to the Syrian Observatory for Human Rights, seven soldiers were killed on 30 November in fighting in the town of Deal in Daraa province after security forces moved on the town in force. The fighting went on from the early morning to the late afternoon. "Two security force vehicles were blown up. Seven (troops) were killed," said Rami Abdel Rahman, head of the observatory. An activist from the town, in the province of Daraa, said some 30 busloads of security men stormed Deal and two of the buses were blown up in fighting "between security forces and defectors," the Observatory reported. One of the destroyed buses was allegedly empty.

==== Idlib intelligence building raid ====
On 1 December, FSA troops launched a raid on an intelligence building in Idlib, leading to a three-hour firefight in which eight loyalists were killed. This came the same day the United Nations announced it considered Syria to be in a state of civil war. On 3 December, clashes in the city of Idlib in the north of Syria the next day resulted in the death of seven Assad loyalist soldiers, five defectors and three civilians. On 4 December, heavy fighting raged in Homs during which at least five FSA insurgents were killed and one wounded. Defected soldiers killed four members of the security forces, including an officer, at the southern city of Deal in Daraa province on 5 December. On 7 December, there were clashes between the Syrian regular army and groups of army defectors near the radio broadcasting centre in the town of Saraqeb, in Idib district. An armoured personnel carrier (APC) of the regular army was destroyed during the clashes. Meanwhile, joint security and military forces raided the houses at the edges of Saraqeb and arrested three activists at dawn, according to the Syrian Observatory for Human Rights. Between 1 and 7 December, the Syrian state news agency SANA reported the deaths of 48 members of the state security forces.

==== Escalating clashes in Daraa ====
A military tank was destroyed in Homs on 9 December. Four defected soldiers also apparently died in fighting on 9 December. On 10 December, activists say clashes between Syrian troops and army defectors killed at least two people. The British-based Syrian Observatory for Human Rights says two army armoured carriers were burned in the pre-dawn clash in the northwestern town of Kfar Takharim. On 11 December, it was reported that a battle was fought between defectors and the Syrian army in Busra al-Harir and Lajat. Troops, mainly from the 12th Armoured Brigade, based in Isra, 40 km from the border with Jordan, stormed the nearby town of Busra al-Harir, the Reuters news agency reported. It was apparently the largest battle to take place in the conflict so far. At least five soldiers, including a military officer, are reported to have been killed the same day in an unspecified location. In one of Sunday's clashes, which took place before dawn in the northwestern town of Kfar Takharim, two of the military's armored vehicles were set ablaze, said the British-based Syrian Observatory for Human Rights. Three other vehicles were burned in another clash near the southern village of Busra al-Harir, the group said. Similar battles took place in several other parts of the south, said the Observatory and another activist group called the Local Coordination Committees.

==== Urban fighting in Homs ====
Syrian army defectors, who operate under the banner of the Free Syrian Army, say that a senior army officer was killed on 11 December after refusing to fire on civilians in Homs. Maher al-Nueimi, a spokesman for the FSA, said that Brigadier-General Salman al-Awaja was given instructions to fire on residents of al-Quseir in Homs. When he refused, Nueimi said, he was killed. The FSA says that a large number of defections took place after the killing, as clashes broke out between al-Awaja's supporters in the army and the other soldiers who killed him. The Observatory said two people were killed in the clash with defectors in Kfar Takharim and two armoured vehicles were destroyed. On 12 December, three civilians and two defectors were killed during clashes in Idlib province. Fighting in Ebita, in the northwestern province of Idlib, continued throughout the night and into the early hours on 12 December. At least one fighter was killed and another injured in the assault. The FSA killed ten troops in an ambush on a convoy in Idlib, according to the Syrian Observatory for Human Rights. This attack was allegedly done to avenge the deaths of 11 civilians previously killed. A Syrian officer was also killed in a revenge attack. Loyalist soldiers reportedly fired upon a civilian car near Homs on 14 December, killing five people, in response, the Free Syrian Army staged an ambush against a loyalist convoy consisting of four jeeps, killing eight soldiers. The same day, three anti-government military defectors were wounded in clashes with Syrian security forces in the village of Hirak in Daraa province. The FSA engaged loyalist army units and security service agents south of Damascus on 15 December, leading to 27 loyalist deaths and an unknown number of FSA casualties. The clashes broke out at three separate checkpoints in Daraa province around dawn Between 8 and 15 December, the Syrian state news agency SANA reported the deaths of 68 members of the state security forces. A lieutenant colonel of the FSA was killed by the Syrian army on 17 December according to Local Committee, and opposition source.

==== Unsuccessful defection in Idlib ====
On 19 December, the FSA suffered its largest loss of life when new defectors tried to abandon their positions and bases between the villages of Kensafra and Kefer Quaid in Idlib province. Activist groups, specifically the Syrian Observatory for Human rights, reported that 72 defectors were killed as they were gunned down during their attempted escape. The Syrian Army lost three soldiers during the clashes. The next day, S.O.H.R. stated that in all 100 defectors were killed or wounded. The clashes continued into the next day, and another report, by Lebanese human rights activist Wissam Tarif, put the death toll even higher with 163 defectors, 97 government troops and nine civilians killed on the second day alone as the military tracked down the soldiers and civilian that managed to initially escape. On 21 December, it was reported that the FSA had taken control over large swathes of Idlib province including some towns and villages. It was also reported on 24 December that the FSA stronghold in the Bab Amr neighbourhood of Homs was under attack by security forces, with two FSA soldiers killed. A week later, a minute long fire fight erupted between FSA forces and government security forces, on a road near the village of Dael in Daraa province. Four government soldiers were killed in the ambush. The FSA grew in size, to about 20,000 by December 2011.

=== Religious and ethnic character ===
In the early days of their existence, 90% of the FSA consisted of Sunni Muslims and a small minority were (Shia) Alawites, Druze, Christians, Kurds and Palestinians.

Western sources in December 2011 again gave estimates of 10,000 Syrian deserters, indicated that half the Syrian army conscripts had not reported to army duty in the last three call-ups, and that lower-level officers were deserting in large numbers; in some cases, whole units had deserted en masse. An anonymously speaking U.S. official however estimated in December 2011 1,000 to 3,500 defectors in total.

In 2011, The Turkish government provided free passage to defecting Syrian Army fighters and allowed the FSA to operate from a special refugee camp in Southern Turkey near the Syrian border. Turkey would allow the FSA to begin operating in nearby towns and encouraged foreign intervention in the Syrian Civil War.

In August 2012, the National Unity Brigades was formed. Known for its non-sectarianism. The group included rebels from minority groups such as Christians, Druze, Ismailis, and Alawites.

External videos
- Idlib, Syria, 21 February 2012, About 500 soldiers led by Afif Suleiman defect from the Syrian army's 17th Regiment and join the opposition Free Syrian Army.

=== 2012 – Height of the Free Syrian Army ===
==== January/February – high-ranked officer defections ====
On 6 January 2012, General Mustafa al-Sheikh of the Syrian Army defected from the government forces to join the FSA. General Mustafa al-Sheikh told Reuters that up to 20,000 soldiers in total had deserted the army since the beginning of the conflict, and that the FSA had taken control of large swathes of land. He said in an interview on 12 January 2012: "If we get 25,000 to 30,000 deserters mounting guerrilla warfare in small groups of six or seven it is enough to exhaust the army in a year to a year-and-a-half, even if they are armed only with rocket-propelled grenades and light weapons".

On 7 January 2012, Colonel Afif Mahmoud Suleiman of the Syrian Air Force logistics division defected from Bashar al-Assad's regime along with at least fifty of his men. He announced his group's defection on live television and ordered his men to protect protesters in the city of Hama. Colonel Suleiman declared: "We are from the army and we have defected because the government is killing civilian protesters. The Syrian army attacked Hama with heavy weapons, air raids and heavy fire from tanks. ... We ask the Arab League observers to come visit areas affected by air raids and attacks so you can see the damage with your own eyes, and we ask you to send someone to uncover the three cemeteries in Hama filled with more than 460 corpses."

Syrian forces clashed with army deserters in an area near the capital Damascus, opposition activists said. The town of Reef Damascus saw fighting on 1 January as the government forces were hunting for suspected defectors, according to the activists. There were no immediate reports of casualties. According to the London-based Syrian Observatory for Human rights, despite a self-declared ceasefire, Free Syrian Army soldiers in Idlib, on 2 January, overran two checkpoints belonging to security forces and captured dozens of loyalist troops, and launched an attack on a third checkpoint killing and wounding several loyalists. More than a dozen people, including 11 soldiers, were killed in clashes between defectors and loyalists in Basr al-Harir, a town in southern Daraa Governorate, according to the Syrian Observatory for Human Rights. Shelling and gunfire were also reported in Deir ez-Zor by the LCC. On 14 January, the Syrian Observatory For Human Rights said there was fighting between deserters and loyalist troops in Hula, Homs province, after the defectors destroyed a barricade and a number of security forces were killed or wounded.

In mid-January, the FSA managed to take control over the border town of Zabadani, just 14 miles away from the capital, Damascus. Regular army forces tried to assault the town several times but as of 16 January all attacks were repelled.

On 16 January General Mouaffac Hamzeh in the city of Qusayr in Homs province was announced to have defected to the opposition.

By 26 January, the Damascus suburb of Douma had fallen under control of the Free Syrian Army, with occasional raids by security forces failing to dislodge the rebels, mainly made of armed civilians, and some army defectors, mostly armed with assault rifles and hand grenades. Because of the growing number of defectors, some defectors managed to take their tanks with them. A spokesman for the Free Syrian Army said that more than 100 soldiers defected on 28 January 2012, bringing three tanks along with them. By the end of January and the beginning of February, videos surfaced showing BMP-2 armoured personnel carriers in Homs carrying the Syrian independence flag firing at government forces, supported by FSA soldiers.

On 29 January, there were reports of a new round of high-ranking defections after the Syrian Army was deployed to fight in the Damascus suburbs, some of them joining FSA. At least two generals and hundreds of soldiers with their weapons defected at this time.

Between 29 and 30 January, government forces massed over 2,000 troops and at least 50 tanks and launched a major offensive to reclaim the northern suburbs – held by the FSA – and drive them from the city. By the end of 30 January, it appeared that the operation had been mostly successful, and the FSA had made a tactical withdrawal. 10 FSA fighters and eight government soldiers were killed during the day in the whole country. Two of the defectors died in the Damascus suburb of Rankus, which had been retaken by the military. Another report put the day's death toll in the suburbs at 19 civilians and 6 FSA fighters, while the overall number of those killed in the previous three days, since the fighting in the area started, was 100. The same day, it was reported by opposition activists that one of the original founders of the FSA, Colonel Hussein Harmush, who was captured in late August by Syrian special forces, was executed several weeks earlier.

On 31 January, the Syrian army continued to advance to remove the last FSA pockets. The army fired into the air, as they advanced with tanks even beyond the positions from where the FSA withdrew. Activists told that the suburbs were on unannounced curfew while others were allowed to flee. The army was conducting arrests on suspected people in the district of Arbin. In some instances, curfews were defied by some citizens, who put up a large opposition flag in the centre of Damascus.

On 1 February, the Syrian army extended their operations around Damascus, with more troops moving into the mountainous area of Qaramoun, north of Damascus. Further north, the troops which took the control of Rankous, started to extend their control into farmland surrounding the city. In the eastern suburbs of Mesraba, activist reported that army snipers were positioned and that tanks were in the streets. Initially, 12 people, including six FSA rebels, were killed in fighting in Wadi Barada, located north-west of Damascus in the Rif Damashk governorate, according to the Local Committee of Coordination. Later, the death toll of FSA fighters in the area was raised to 14. The town of Deir Kanoun and Ein al Fija were also under army assaults according to the London-based SOHR. At the same time, SANA reported that, further south in the suburbs Daraa, security forces killed 11 armed fighters and wounded two when they attacked a military bus killing one army sergeant and wounding two others. Also, the Al-Watan newspaper reported that 37 rebel fighters were killed in fighting in Homs and 15 in Rastan, while four soldiers died in Bab Dreib and two in Rastan.

According to the Syrian Observatory for Human Rights, troops and army defectors clashed in the northwestern province of Idlib and the southern province of Daraa on 5 February. They report two civilians and nine soldiers killed in Idlib. Five government troops were shot in clashes with rebel fighters in Qalaat al-Madyaq town in restive Hama area, on 14 February.

On the night of 3 February and in the early hours of 4 February, government forces launched a major offensive against Homs, leading to over 200 deaths and 800 injuries. FSA forces engaged loyalist forces and threatened reprisals particularly in Damascus. On 10 February, Sky News reported that the FSA had taken full control of the northern city of Idlib. However, Syrian tanks were surrounding Idlib, and citizens and defected soldiers feared a new offensive. Renewed fighting in the Idlib province was reported on 11 February.

On 6 February 2012, Riad al-Asaad voiced his concern about the SNC's lack of political and material support for the FSA, and stated that if differences could not be resolved the FSA would break off its relations with the SNC.

Heavy fighting had taken place in the town of Al-Qusayr in Homs since 13 February, when the FSA captured the headquarters of the secret service in Homs, killing five agents in the process. Remaining government troops retreated to the town hall and hospital in the city. Four tanks came to reinforce them. However, 1 of the 4 tanks as well as 30 soldiers defected to the opposition, where the tank, aided by tractors and trucks, took out remaining government positions and the other 3 tanks. During the Battle of Al-Qusayr, FSA fighters were able to establish full control of the city. They said 20 government soldiers had been killed and 80 had fled. FSA fighters said 1 of their men had been killed and another 6 wounded during the battle.

Around 18 February 2012, General Fayez Amro of the Syrian Air Force, who was from the Bab Amr district in Homs and of Turkmen origin, defected to Turkey.

Another intelligence general from the Syrian army also defected at this time to Turkey. His name was not disclosed due to security reasons, opposition forces said.

22 February, a brigadier general defected in Idlib with 200 of his soldiers. In March, General Adnan Farzat from the city of Rastan and two other generals defected. Turkish government sources reported that same month a surge in desertions with 20,000 desertions in the past month alone bringing the total number of deserters from the Syrian army to over 60,000 soldiers.

In February 2012, Fahad Al Masri was one of the founders of the first joint command of the Free Syrian Army Interior, along with Colonel Qassem Saad Eddin and other officers, and helped strengthen the formation of military councils, at the governorate level, and the establishment of press offices. Al Masri was accredited as the movement's spokesman.

In late February 2012, the Syrian National Council established a military bureau to oversee military operations. This initiative was met with criticism by Free Syrian Army leaders who said that they had not been informed. Defected General Mustafa al-Sheikh created a similar discord in the army when he established a rival group called the Higher Military Revolutionary Council which was rejected by the FSA leadership and field units.

Earlier the Muslim Brotherhood had also tried to coopt the FSA but the leadership rejected their attempt. Colonel Al Kurdi, the deputy leader of the FSA, dismissed the internal disputes and said that despite disagreements, the opposition remained united against the government and in their call for arms.

In late 2011, the FSA established control over a number of towns and villages across Idlib province.

Later in January 2012, the Free Syrian Army succeeded in taking control of the town of Zabadani in Damascus province, following intense clashes with the regular troops.

On 21 January, the FSA temporarily captured the town of Douma, near Damascus.

The Free Syrian Army also for three months controlled around two-thirds of Homs, Syria's third largest city, according to Syrian military officers inside the city.

In January, some Damascus suburbs fell under partial opposition control. For example, the town of Saqba, an eastern suburb of Damascus fell under opposition control for a week until the FSA was forced to tactically retreat into the local population after sustaining heavy bombardment by the Syrian Army. In late February, the city of Idlib was under opposition control, with opposition flags flying in the city centre.

=== Methods and tactics ===
As deserted government soldiers had no armored vehicles and only light weaponry and munitions, FSA in August–October 2011 mostly ambushed security forces and the state's Shabiha (ghost) militia, and attacked trucks and buses bringing in security reinforcements by planting bombs or with hit-and-run attacks, but seldom confronted other regular army soldiers.

The FSA uses guerrilla warfare tactics when it fights and does not aim to occupy terrain once a fight is over, however, by late 2011 large swathes of area in Syria had fallen under partial control of the Free Syrian Army.

The Free Syrian Army's armed actions focus on the government's combat advantages, which include the ability to mount coordinated operations on a large scale, the ability to move its forces at will, and the ability to employ heavy firepower. To counter these advantages, the FSA has mounted attacks on the government's command and control and logistical infrastructure. A sabotage campaign has begun in Syria, with reports of attacks on different government assets. The FSA has mounted attacks on security service command centers, and posts information on Syrian social media sites about blocking roads, attacking logistics vehicles, cutting coaxial communications cables servicing airfields, destroying telecommunications towers, sabotaging government vehicles by sugaring fuel tanks, and attacking railways and pipelines.

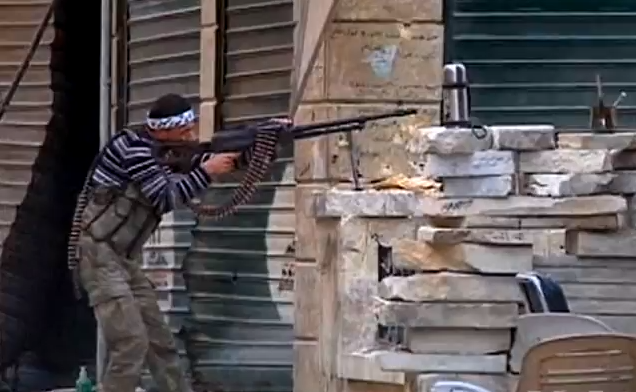
An FSA fighter engaged in a firefight in Aleppo

The Free Syrian Army on the local level engages and ambushes the state's shabiha militia and confronts the army during which it encourages defections. Some members of the Free Syrian Army have stated that the organization does not have the resources to occupy and take control of territories, and instead relies primarily on hit and run attacks to prompt the Syrian army into withdrawing. The FSA also uses improvised explosive devices to attack military convoys of buses, trucks and tanks that are transporting supplies and security reinforcements and engages in attack and retreat operations on government checkpoints. In neighborhoods opposed to the government, the FSA has acted as a defense force, guarding streets while protests take place and attacking the militias, known as shabiha, which are an integral part of the government's efforts to suppress dissent. In Deir ez-Zor, Al-Rastan, Abu Kamal and other cities the Free Syrian Army, however, engaged in street battles that raged for days with no particular side gaining the advantage. The FSA has also sought international help in bringing down the Assad government. It has asked the international community for arms and the implementation of a no fly zone and naval blockade of Syria

Communication inside the battalion unit is carried out by walkie talkie. The FSA battalion units work closely with the local population and defectors typically join units from the region or town that they come. The FSA is closely interlinked with ad hoc activist networks and it works closely with the civilian formed local councils. Around key population centers, such as Damascus, Aleppo, Daraa and Hama, the FSA operates military councils that coordinate operations in the area.

The army's command and control is exercised through a variety of means, including mobile phones, voice over IP, email, couriers and social media. In November 2011, the army spent $2 million to improve communication links between opposition fighters in Syria. The Bashar al-Assad government captured a number of sophisticated communications devices from opposition fighters, including Thuraya mobile satellite phones, very high and ultra-high frequency (VHF/UHF) devices, and Inmarsat mobile communication satellite systems. In February 2012, Qatar had supplied the army with 3,000 satellite phones. The United States has also provided communication equipment to help create a more structured army.

At the outset, the Free Syrian Army was mainly armed with AK-47s, DShKs and RPG-7s. As defecting soldiers lack air cover, deserting soldiers have to abandon their armoured vehicles. Soldiers defected carrying only their army issued light arms and hide in cities, suburbs or the cover of the countryside. Besides AK-47s, some FSA soldiers also have M16s, Steyr AUGs, G3s, FN FALs, SVDs and shotguns, and PK machine guns.

The FSA had a few heavy weapons captured from the Syrian government. In February 2012, video footage was posted online showing a captured government tank, being used in Homs by FSA forces. The tank carried Syrian opposition flags and was seen firing with armed men in civilian clothes taking cover behind it. An FSA spokesman has said that the organization received three tanks from a group of 100 deserters from the Syrian army. The FSA has also reportedly acquired a number of anti-aircraft missiles.

The Free Syrian Army later began manufacturing its own mortars and rockets. Raids on government checkpoints and arms depots are carried out to supply the FSA with much of its ammunition and new arms. The FSA also purchases weapons on the Syrian black market which is supplied by arms smugglers from neighboring countries and corrupt loyalist forces selling government arms.

There have been reports that whole arms depots have been offered for sale, although these offers were refused because of fears of a potential trap. FSA fighters are also sometimes able to purchase weapons directly from army supply bases, provided that they have enough money to satisfy the government troops guarding them. It is also reported that the FSA purchases much of its heavy weaponry from Iraqi arms smugglers.

Col. Riad Asaad has asked the international community to supply the FSA with arms to alleviate the organization's supply issues.

==== March to December – issues of organization ====
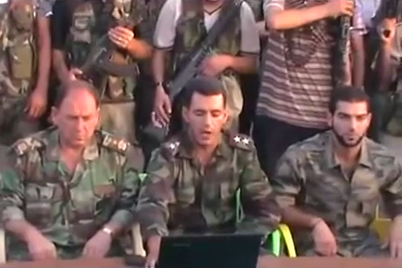
A colonel (left) and a first lieutenant (right) in the FSA announce the formation of the Conquest Brigade, part of the FSA in Tell Rifaat, north of Aleppo, 31 July 2012.

In March 2012, two reporters of The New York Times witnessed an FSA attack with a roadside bomb and AK-47 rifles on a column of armored Syrian tanks in Saraqib in Idlib Governorate, and learned that FSA had a stock of able, trained soldiers and ex-officers, organized to some extent, but were without the weapons to put up a realistic fight.

Baba Amr district in Homs fell to government forces on the morning of 1 March, as the Free Syrian Army claimed they had made a "tactical retreat" from the area, after running low on weapons and ammunition. They made the decision to withdraw from Baba Amr and into other parts of Homs because "worsening humanitarian conditions, lack of food and medicine and water, electricity and communication cuts as well as shortages in weapons."

Shortly after their retreat from Baba Amr in Homs, the FSA suffered another setback on 3 March, when a defection of 50 soldiers from the Abu Athuhoor Military Airport in Idlib province was foiled after their plans were discovered. 47 of the soldiers were executed and only three managed to escape. Their bodies were reportedly dumped in a lake.

A raid was conducted in the Mezze area of Damascus, involving machine-gun fire and rocket propelled grenades. A defecting general was escorted from the area. A military helicopter flew over the area leading to the detection and deaths of 7 FSA fighters. Also, 80 elements of the security forces including pro-government militia were reportedly killed and 200 wounded during the clashes. The deputy commander of the Free Syrian Army also said that two military tanks were destroyed during the operation. However, neither the opposition-affiliated SOHR activist group or any independent media confirmed the high number of government casualties in the clashes.

FSA fighters claimed to control the back roads in the countryside, but also admitted that no one knew for certain where the Syrian Army would be at a given time. On 24 March 2012, the Free Syrian Army united with the Higher Military Council. The groups agreed to put their differences behind them, and in a statement said: "First, we decided to unite all the military councils and battalions and all the armed battalions inside the country under one unified leadership of the Free Syrian Army and to follow the orders of the commander of the FSA, Col. Riad al-Asaad."

By late April 2012, despite a cease-fire being declared in the whole country, heavy fighting continued in Al-Qusayr, where rebel forces controlled the northern part of the city, while the military held the southern part. FSA forces were holding onto Al-Qusayr, due to it being the last major transit point toward the Lebanese border. A rebel commander from the Farouq Brigades in the town reported that 2,000 Farouq fighters had been killed in Homs province since August 2011. At this point, there were talks among the rebels in Al-Qusayr, where many of the retreating rebels from Homs city's Baba Amr district had gone, of Homs being abandoned completely.

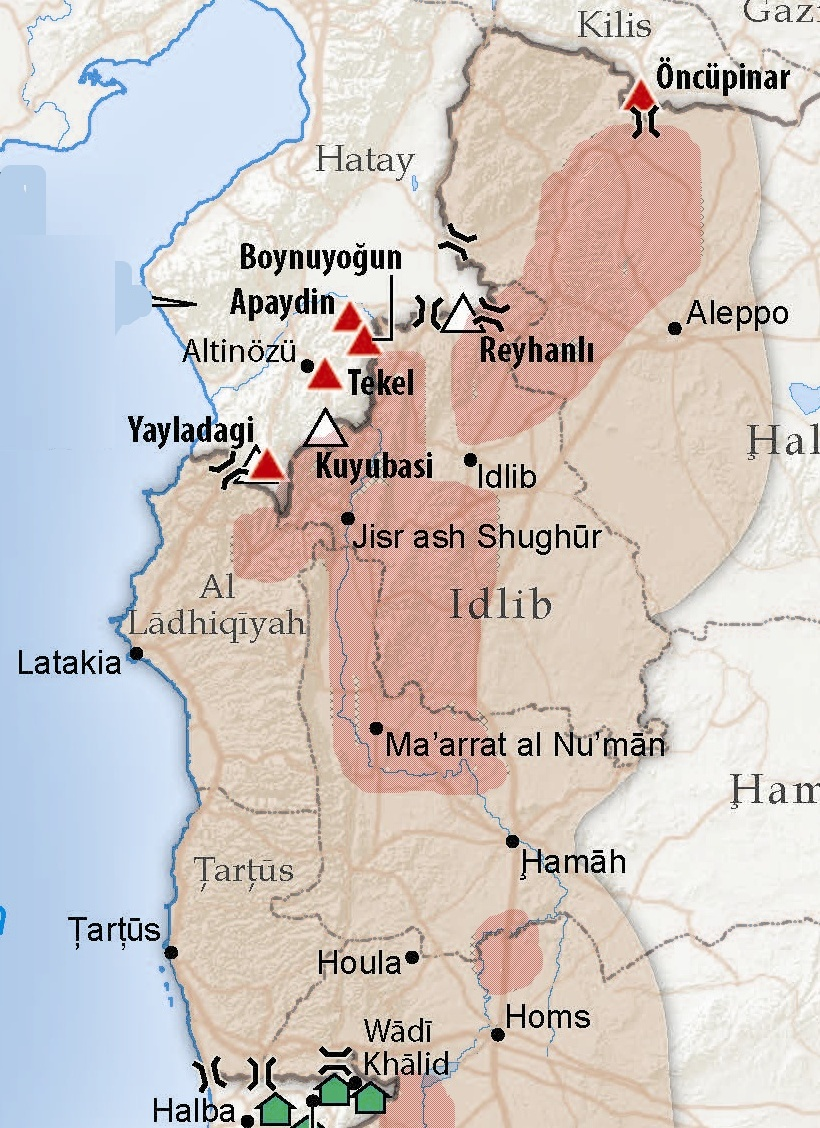
Areas of conflict and displacement (light purple), refugee camps (red triangles), displaced in host homes (green houses), FSA held territory (red), June 2012.

By late April 2012, despite a cease-fire being declared in the whole country, heavy fighting continued in Al-Qusayr, where rebel forces controlled the northern part of the city, while the military held the southern part. FSA forces were holding onto Al-Qusayr, due to it being the last major transit point toward the Lebanese border. A rebel commander from the Farouq Brigades in the town reported that 2,000 Farouq fighters had been killed in Homs province since August 2011. At this point, there were talks among the rebels in Al-Qusayr, where many of the retreating rebels from Homs city's Baba Amr district had gone, of Homs being abandoned completely.

Despite the UN ceasefire, fighting between the Free Syrian Army and Syrian government forces continued throughout May. The FSA had used much of early May to regroup and gradually launched more and more attacks on government forces as the month progressed (despite often being poorly armed) and it became clear that the ceasefire had failed. Kofi Annan himself expressed exasperation at the ongoing violence. Footage in late-May appeared to show FSA forces had been destroying Assad forces' tanks in Idlib.

In May, United Nations monitors confirmed media reports that large areas of Syria's countryside and provincial cities were under the de facto control of the FSA. The Free Syrian Army has stated that it only has partial control over its held areas, and that in a head-to-head battle with the Syrian army was unable in most cases to hold the territory. The FSA's goal as of winter was to loosen government control over areas, rather than to impose firm control of its own.

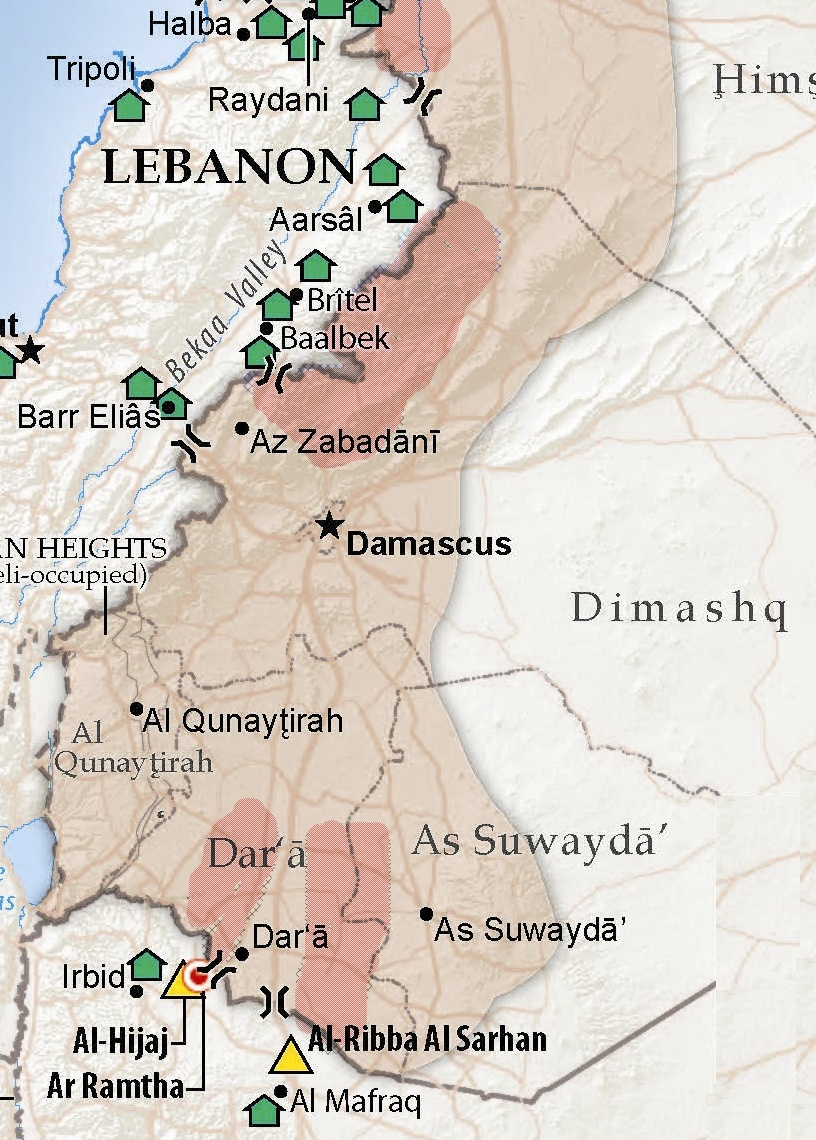
Areas of conflict and displacement (light purple), refugee camps (yellow triangles), displaced in host homes (green houses), FSA held territory (red), June 2012.

By June 2012, CNN estimated opposition forces to have grown to 40,000 men. The Free Syrian Army announced on 4 June it was abandoning its ceasefire agreement. Spokesman Sami al-Kurdi told Reuters that the FSA had begun attacking soldiers to "defend our people". At least 80 government soldiers were killed in escalating violence over that weekend. By mid-June, the FSA controlled large swathes of land in Idlib governorate and Northern Hama governorate. In these areas, the FSA and local individuals administered justice and the distribution of supplies to residents.

It was reported on 28 June that the opposition almost entirely controlled the city of Deir ez-Zor, while the government army had shelled it, trying to take it back. Human rights groups said that this assault with tanks and artillery had killed over 100 residents. The government also reportedly told doctors not to treat people at local hospitals and targeted hospitals that refused with mortar rounds. Humanitarian aid workers from the Syrian Arab Red Crescent were targeted by the army, one worker was killed. In Homs, the FSA held out against government forces bombarding large parts of the city, including the opposition bastion of Khaldiyah. Also, renewed fighting between rebels and loyalists was reported in the Baba Amr neighbourhood of Homs.

By July 2012, there were over 100,000 defectors from the armed forces reported. In July, it was reported that the Free Syrian Army had taken control of a number of suburbs north of the capital Damascus, including Zamalka and Irbeen. FSA fighters openly patrolled the streets of the suburbs, and clashes occurred less than 10 kilometers from the center of Damascus city itself.

It was reported that the Free Syrian Army also took control of a commercial crossing in Bab al-Hawa in Syria's northern frontier. FSA fighters had fought government forces there for ten days until they won. FSA fighters were seen in video footage, destroying portraits of Assad and celebrating their victory.

On 21 August 2012, Fahad Al Masri was the first to meet the international envoy to Syria, Lakhdar Brahimi, after his meeting with French President Francois Hollande as part of his mission in the Syrian file in France.

Prior to September 2012, the Free Syrian Army operated its command and headquarters from Turkey's southern Hatay province close to the Syrian border with field commanders operating inside Syria. In September 2012, the FSA announced that it had moved its headquarters to rebel-controlled territory of Idlib Governorate in northern Syria, which was later overrun by the Islamic Front in December 2013.

In October 2012, Fahad Al Masri, spokesman for the Free Syrian Army, went to Turkey to participate in meetings with several officers who had defected in areas near the Syrian-Turkish border, as well as with the French ambassador in charge of the Syrian file with several military.

According to a France 24 report in October 2012, "rich businessmen from Damascus and Aleppo support the FSA as well as political organisations like the Muslim Brotherhood." The ideology of various FSA groups depended on their sponsors and funders. "If a militia receives money from the Muslim Brotherhood, then it obviously going to be an Islamist militia", an observer stated.

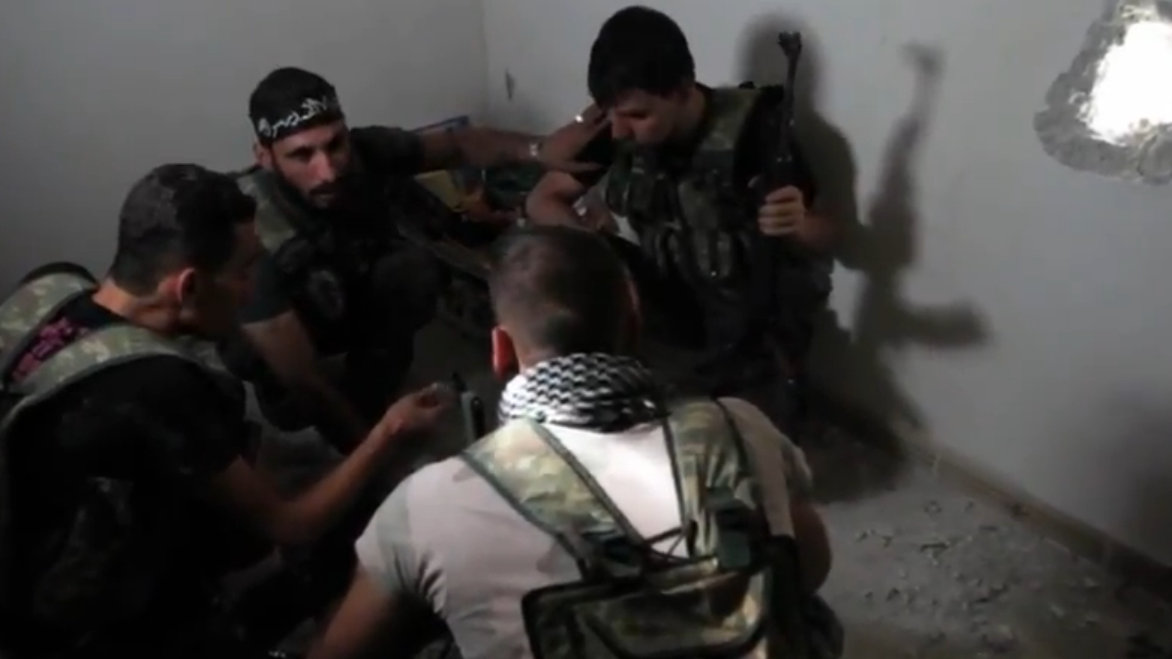
FSA fighters plan during the Battle of Aleppo (October 2012).

The Syrian National Coalition, formed in November 2012 and by September 2013 based in Istanbul, dubbed the 'main opposition alliance', was explicitly recognized by the FSA by September 2013.

On 18 November, rebels took control of one of the Syrian Army's largest military bases in northern Syria, Base 46 in the Aleppo Governorate after weeks of intense fighting with government forces. Defected General Mohammed Ahmed al-Faj, who commanded the assault, hailed the capture of Base 46 as "one of our biggest victories since the start of the revolution" against Bashar al-Assad, claiming nearly 300 Syrian troops had been killed and 60 had been captured with rebels seizing large amounts of heavy weapons and tanks.

On 22 November, rebels captured the Mayadin military base in the country's eastern Deir ez Zor province. Activists said this gave the rebels control of a large amount of territory east of the base, to the Iraqi border.

On 7 December 2012, about 260 to 550 commanders and representatives of the Syrian armed opposition met in Antalya and elected a new 30-person military council for the FSA, called Supreme Military Council. Colonel Riad al-Asaad, who was not present at the meeting, retained his formal role as Commander-in-Chief but lost effective power to Brigadier General Salim Idris, who was elected as the new Chief of Staff of the FSA and effective leader.

Security officials from the United States, United Kingdom, France, the Gulf Cooperation Council and Jordan were present at the meeting, days before a meeting of the Friends of Syria Group that had pledged non-military aid to militant rebels.

Al-Nusra Front and Ahrar ash-Sham were not invited to the meeting. Thomson Reuters stated that the new Chief of Staff Gen. Salim Idris "is not ideological", while two of his new deputy commanders, Abdelbasset Tawil from Idlib Governorate and Abdelqader Saleh from Aleppo Governorate are Islamist. FSA commanders "[appeared] to want to sideline extremist groups that have been playing a bigger role in recent months" and that there would be a total of five deputy commanders associated with five different regions of Syria.

==== Late 2012 command structure ====
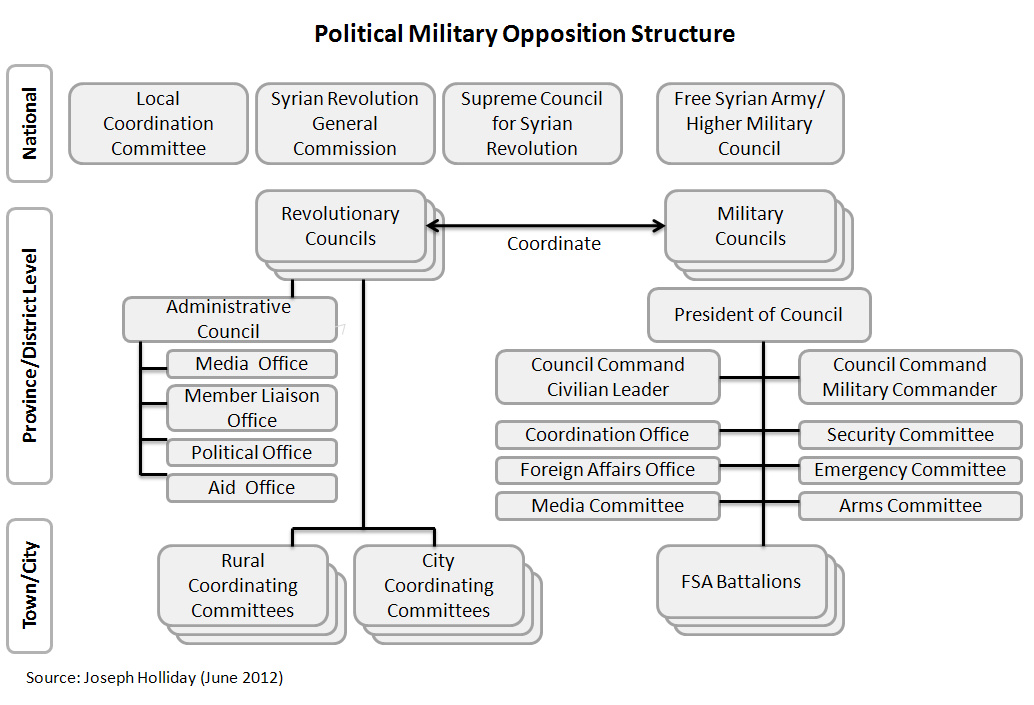

In December 2012, more than 260 Free Syrian Army rebel commanders from all over Syria agreed to a unified command structure of the Free Syrian Army. The participants elected a 30-member Supreme Military Council, which then selected General Salim Idris as chief of staff. Idris was later replaced by Abdul-Ilah al-Bashir.

The FSA's formal leader is its Commander-in-Chief Colonel Riad al-Asaad; however, the army's effective military leader is its Supreme Military Councils Chief of Staff, Brigadier General Abdul-Ilah al-Bashir. Beneath General al-Bashir there are five deputy chief of staffs who are in charge of five different regions of Syria. Two of these deputy chiefs of staff are Abdelbasset Tawil from Idlib Governorate and Abdelqader Saleh from Aleppo Governorate.

Free Syrian Army Brigade Commanders
Commander	Brigade
Abdul Rahman Sheikh Ali	Khalid bin Walid
Lt. Abdul Razzaq Tlass	Al-Farouq
Abdel Qader Saleh	Al-Tawhid
Ahmed Abu Issa	Suqour al-Sham
Mahdi Al-Harati (former)	Liwaa Al-Umma

The Free Syrian Army has field units located across the country. The field units are under the direct command of nine regional commanders which are based in the provinces of Homs, Hama, Idlib, Deir al-Zor, Damascus, Aleppo and Latakia. The regional commanders include Colonel Qasim Saad al-Din who directs military operations in Homs province and Colonel Khaled al-Haboush who directs military operations in the capital. The regional commanders are under the direct operational command of Colonel Riad Asaad and hold conference calls almost daily. For internal communication and operations, the FSA appears to have an extensive internet based communication network that state security has tried to penetrate.

Free Syrian Army Local Field Units
Battalions and Location

−

- Farouq Brigades (Homs city)
- Ammar bin Yassir battalion (Idlib province)
- Hamza al-Khateeb battalion (Idlib city)
- Al-Furqan battalion (Idlib province)
- Harmoush battalion (Idlib province)
- Martyrs Ma'arat Nu'man battalion (Idlib province)
- Shield of Islam battalion (Idlib province)
- Salaheddine Al-Ayoubi battalion (Jisr ash-Shugur)
- Qashoush battalion (Hama city)
- Aboul Fidaa battalion (Hama province)
- Saad Bin Moaz battalion (Hama province)
- Moawiyah Bin Abi Sufian (Damascus city)
- Houriyeh battalion (Aleppo city)
- Ababeel battalion (Aleppo province)
- Lions of Shahba battalion (Aleppo province)
- Saad Allah Al-Jabiri battalion (Aleppo province)
- Omari battalion (Daraa/Hauran)
- Sultan Pasha Al-Atrash battalion (As-Suwayda)
- Qassam battalion (Jableh)
- Suqur battalion (Latakia)
- Samer Nunu battalion (Baniyas)
- Mishaal Tammo battalion (Qamishli)
- Odai Al-Tayi battalion (Hasakah)
- Omar Ibn al-Khattab battalion (Deir ez-Zor city)
- Moaz Al-Raqad battalion (Deir ez-Zor province)
- Allahu Akbar battalion (Abu Kamal)
- Dawn of Freedom battalion (Homs province)
- Ramy Al-Sayeed battalion (Homs province)
- Tel Kalakh Martyrs' battalion (Homs province)
- Ahmad Nayif Al-Sukhni battalion (Raqqa)
- Abu Obeidah bin Al-Jarrah battalion (Damascus province)
- Sham Falcons, eight battalions (Jabal al-Zawiya)

Free Syrian Army Regional Military Councils
Commander	Province
Col. Khaled al-Haboush	Damascus
Col. Abdel Jabbar al-Oqaidi (25,000–30,000 troops)	Aleppo
Col. Qassim Suad al-Din	Homs
Col. Abdel Hamid Alshawi	Hama
Col. Afeef Suleiman	Idlib
Capt. Qais Qataneh, Lt. Sharif; Kayed (council members)	Daraa
Anas Abu Malik	Latakia
Unknown	Deir al-Zor

The Free Syrian Army has adopted the configuration and tactics of a guerrilla force. A typical field unit such as the Tel Kalakh Martyrs' Brigade numbers between 300 and 400 fighters split into combat units of six to 10 men. Each man in the unit is armed with a light weapon, such as an AK-47, and the combat unit as a whole is equipped with an RPG launcher and a light machine gun.

Free Syrian Army units specialize in different tasks. Units close to the borders are involved with logistics and the transport of injured soldiers out of the country and also with the transport medical equipment, material supplies and weapons into the country. Other units such as the Farouq Brigades which are based in the city of Homs are involved in protecting civilians and fending off the Syrian army. The Farouq Brigade is one of the more active FSA battalion units. It is led by Lieutenant Abdul-Razzaq Tlass, the nephew of former Defense Minister Mustafa Tlass. Lieutenant Tlass was one of the first defectors and is one of the key figures in the Syrian uprising. His unit of 500–2,000 soldiers has engaged the Syrian army in Homs and raided Syrian checkpoints and command centers. As of January 2012, the army had around 37 named battalion units, 17–23 of which appeared to be engaged in combat. In October 2012 the Time magazine reported that the FSA was "never more than an umbrella term that provided political cover for the loose franchise of defectors and armed civilians fighting Assad's regime" and some units were merely made up of a few dozen fighters.

=== 2013 – Rise of Islamists ===
Greatest extent of Syrian opposition-controlled territory, March 2013

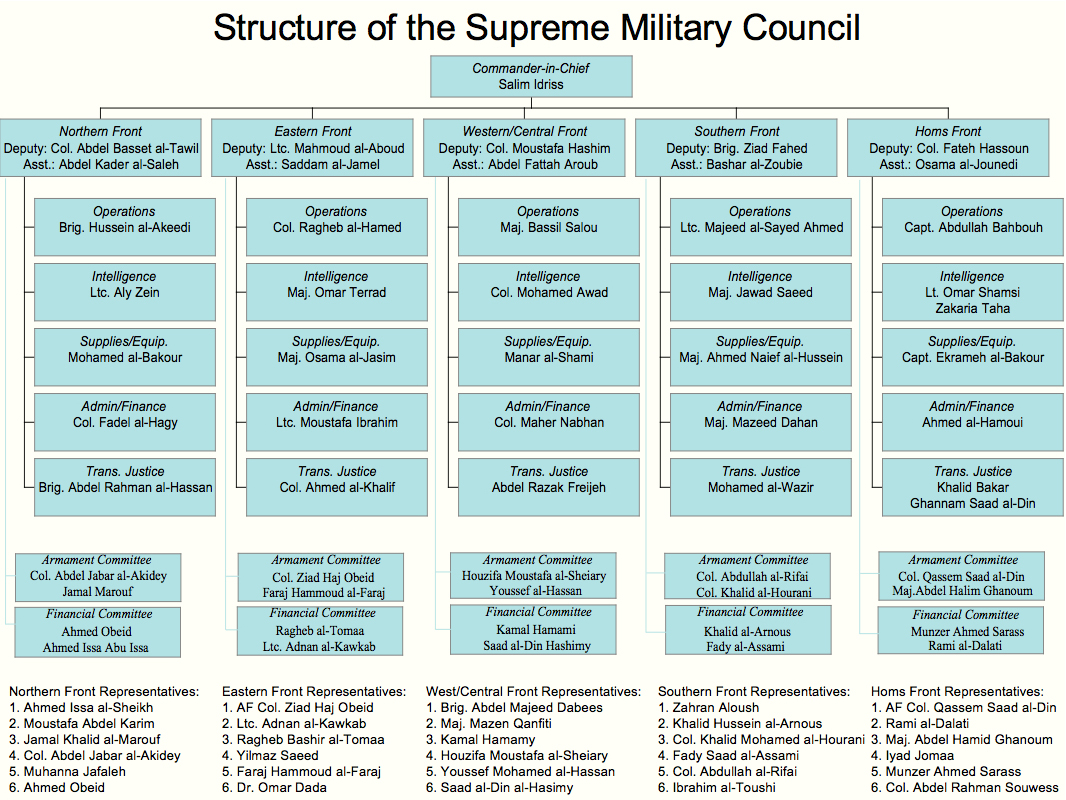
Structure of the Supreme Military Council, the Syrian National Coalition's military wing, by late 2013

In April 2013, the US announced it would transfer $123 million in nonlethal aid to Syrian rebels through the Supreme Military Council led by defected general Salim Idris, the then Chief of Staff of FSA.

In April–May 2013, FSA was losing fighters to Salafist jihadist organisation Al-Nusra Front which was emerging as the best-equipped, financed and motivated anti-Assad force, concluded The Guardian after interviewing FSA commanders across Syria. FSA commander Basha said that in the last few months 3,000 FSA fighters had gone over to al-Nusra, mainly because FSA lacks weapons and ammunition. Another FSA commander said that also the Islamic doctrine of al-Nusra attracts FSA fighters. A Western diplomat played down suggestions that Nusra would be cleaner, better and stronger: "fighters are moving from one group to another", but you can't say that Nusra has in general more momentum than others, he maintained.

In May 2013, FSA commander Salim Idris said that "the rebels" were badly fragmented and lacked the military skill needed to topple the government of President Bashar al-Assad. Idris said he was working on a countrywide command structure, but that a lack of material support—ammunition and weapons, fuel for the cars and money for logistics and salaries—was hurting that effort. "The battles are not so simple now," Idriss said. "Now it is very important for them to be unified. But unifying them in a manner to work like a regular army is still difficult." He denied any cooperation with Al-Nusra Front but acknowledged common operations with another Islamist group Ahrar ash-Sham. The growth of al-Nusra Front and other Islamist groups, during the first half of 2013, disillusioned thousands of FSA men who felt that their own revolution against the government has been stolen from them. In areas of Homs province, fighting between FSA and the Syrian army had virtually ceased.

Another major challenge to FSA arose when the Islamic State of Iraq announced its expansion into Syria on 8 April 2013, when Abubakr al-Baghdadi claimed that Al-Nusra Front was "an extension of the Islamic State in Iraq and part of it" and declared the formation of "Islamic State of Iraq and Levant". While Al-Nusra's leadership rejected the merger, a number of Al-Nusra fighters defected to ISIL and pledged allegiance to Baghdadi. ISIL loyalists and foreign fighters soon began to expand through opposition-held territories in North East Syria throughout the year and captured the city of Raqqa from Free Syrian Army by May 2013. The new developments drastically altered the dynamics of the Syrian civil war and FSA forces began regrouping with the rival Islamic Front to unite against both the Assad regime and ISIL.

On 11 July 2013, an FSA officer was assassinated by a jihadist group, north of Latakia. In mid-August 2013, a delegation of FSA met with an official of President Assad, to suggest talks between government and FSA about "a Syrian solution" to the war. The government accepted this proposal for "a dialogue within the Syrian homeland". Six weeks later, in seven rebel-held areas of Aleppo, civil employees could return to work, and government institutions and schools could reopen. Salafi-Jihadist leader Mohammed Shalabi in Jordan, also known as Abu Sayyaf, stated in July 2013 in Ammon News that irreconcilable differences exist between the aims of FSA and those of Sunni Islamist militias fighting in Syria against Assad.

Initially FSA groups were not averse to the existence of, nor co-operation with, ISIL as a fellow armed group working to remove the Assad regime. Conditions varied in different times and places, but one example of conditional co-operation in the form of joint operations was the 2013 capture of Managh Air Base. After the battle, Col. Abdul Jabbar al-Okaidi, the head of the United States-backed opposition's Aleppo military council, appeared in a video alongside Abu Jandal, a leader of the Islamic State in Iraq and Syria. FSA groups were also engaged in conflict and clashed violently with ISIL in other regions during the same period. During the capture of Managh Air Base the Northern Storm Brigade had been in clashes with ISIL as recently as the month before the base was captured and put their differences to the side to co-operate for the final battle.

Locals near the Turkish border complained in November 2013 that, in contrast with al-Nusra Front, the groups aligned with FSA were becoming increasingly corrupt. Also in 2013, U.S. senior military officials speaking on condition of anonymity indicated that the Pentagon estimates that "extreme Islamist groups" constitute "more than 50 percent" of rebel groups that identify as the Free Syrian Army with the percentage "growing by the day".

=== 2014 – FSA decline, rise of ISIL ===
The International Business Times considered the emergence of ISIL in 2014 as the beginning of the end for groups like FSA which the US had dubbed "moderate rebels". The SMC, the formal FSA command structure, slowly disintegrated within Aleppo Governorate from a lack of resources over the course of 2014. For example, according to data obtained by IBT, the Hazzm movement received a total of about $6 million from the U.S. government in 2014, which works out to just $500,000 a month for a force consisting of 5,000 soldiers.

In February 2014, Colonel Qassem Saadeddine of the FSA announced that Chief of Staff Idris had been replaced with Brigadier General Abdul-Ilah al-Bashir, due to "the paralysis within the military command these past months."

In February 2014, 49 factions came together in the Southern Front (Jabhat al-Janoubi).

In March 2014, Fahad Al Masri, then spokesman for the movement, announced in a statement published by news agencies his withdrawal from the joint command of the Free Syrian Army, due to the state of fragmentation, corruption and Islamization.

In March, FSA and Jordanian sources and video evidence suggested that the FSA received a Saudi shipment of anti-tank missiles through Jordan, and sold these to al-Nusra fighters for $15,000 each.

Abu Yusaf, a high-level commander of Islamic State of Iraq and the Levant (ISIL), said in August 2014 that many of the FSA members who had been trained by United States' and Turkish and Arab military officers were now actually joining ISIL. "In the East of Syria, there is no Free Syrian Army any longer. All Free Syrian Army people [there] have joined the Islamic State" he said.

On 25 September 2014, the Supreme Military Council united with the Syriac Military Council to fight against Assad and the newly declared Islamic State of Iraq and the Levant (ISIL).

In September/October 2014, according to the Kurdish oriented press agency ARA News and the US International Business Times, FSA brigades in Northern Syria, especially the Kobanî area (Aleppo Governorate), united with the Kurdish People's Protection Units (YPG) under the Euphrates Volcano joint operations room, more specifically the Liwa Thuwar al-Raqqa (Revolutionaries of Raqqa Brigade), to oppose ISIL and the Assad government.

In October, Syria Revolutionaries Front (SRF) – an alliance of FSA brigades defying FSA's leadership SMC—was ousted from Idlib by al-Nusra. According to retired Jordanian general Fayez al-Dweiri in November 2014, apart from southern Syria and pockets around Aleppo, "the FSA has been effectively decimated and no longer effectively exists."

The German journalist Jürgen Todenhöfer, having toured for ten days in ISIL-held territory in late 2014, told CNN that the ISIL leadership had said to him: if the FSA get a good weapon, they sell it to us; FSA are our best arms sellers.

=== 2015 – Russian intervention, rise of SDF ===
From October 2015 onwards, several groups that identify as part of the FSA in northern Syria joined the newly founded, and U.S.-supported, Syrian Democratic Forces (SDF) militia umbrella organization. In December 2015, according to the American Institute for the Study of War, groups that identify as FSA were still present around Aleppo and Hama and in southern Syria, and the FSA was still "the biggest and most secular of the rebel groups" fighting the Assad government, but had taken the brunt of the Russian air attacks in Syria since 30 September 2015. The same month, the Istanbul-based think tank Omran Dirasat estimated the FSA self-declared groups at around 35,000 fighters spread out over thousands of groups of various sizes; 27 larger factions of around 1,000 fighters each along with a myriad of smaller groups and localised militias.

=== 2016 – end of Battle of Aleppo, Turkish intervention ===
==== FSA in Turkish-led operations against ISIL and SDF ====
The Turkish military intervention in the Syrian Civil War against Islamic State of Iraq and the Levant (ISIL) and Syrian Democratic Forces, called Operation Euphrates Shield, starting 24 August 2016, was launched by sending groups identifying as FSA into Syria, backed by Turkish armor. The rebels that are active in the area allied with the Turkish army are often referred to as the Syrian National Army (SNA) by the media. Early in the morning of 24 August, Turkish forces directed intense artillery fire against ISIL positions in Jarabulus while the Turkish Air Force bombed 11 targets from the air. Later that day, Turkish main battle tanks followed by pick-up trucks, believed to be carrying Turkish-backed Syrian rebels, and the Turkish Special Forces crossed the border and were joined by hundreds of FSA fighters as the ground forces attacked the town. U.S.-led coalition planes helped the Turkish forces. The FSA said progress was slow because of mines planted by ISIL fighters.

A few hours after the offensive's beginning, Turkish Special Forces and the Sham Legion captured their first village, Tal Katlijah, after ISIL fighters retreated from it to reinforce Jarabulus, according to Faylaq Al-Sham's official media wing. Some time later, the FSA captured four more villages including Tel Shair, Alwaniyah and two other villages. Hours later, Turkish- and US-backed rebels were reported to have captured the border town of Jarabulus, with ISIL offering little resistance. The Syrian Observatory for Human Rights (SOHR) also reported that the FSA had captured almost all of the city. A FSA spokesman stated that a large number of ISIL fighters had withdrawn to al-Bab in front of the offensive.

Turkish-backed forces then began a major attack against the SDF positions, capturing Amarnah and nearby Ayn al-Bayda, according to the SOHR.

On 3 September, Turkey additionally deployed tanks to the Syrian town of al-Rai to help the Turkish-backed rebels to push east from the town towards villages captured by the rebels west of Jarabulus. The incursion was launched from Kilis Province which had been frequently targeted with rocket attacks from ISIL. The Sham Legion and the Hamza Division also announced they had captured four villages (Fursan, Lilawa, Kino and Najma) south of Arab Ezza. The United States stated that it had hit ISIL targets near the Turkey-Syria border via the newly deployed HIMARS system. The Turkish armed forces meanwhile reported that the rebels had captured two villages and an airport near al-Rai. An official of the Fastaqim Kama Umirt also stated that the rebels had captured eight villages to the east and south of the town. SOHR confirmed that the Turkish-backed rebels had captured three villages near the Sajur river with advances in two other villages. It also confirmed that the rebels had captured a village near al-Rai. The U.S. Embassy in Ankara said US forces hit ISIL targets overnight near Turkey's border with Syria using HIMARS located in Turkey.

On 4 September, Turkey declared that the Turkish-backed rebels had captured the last remaining ISIL held villages along the Turkish border, cutting off key supply lines used by the group to bring in foreign fighters, weapons and ammunition.

On 5 September, nine more villages in northern Syria were cleared of ISIL by the Turkish-backed rebels as part of Operation Euphrates Shield, according to Turkish armed forces. On 7 September, around 300 Syrians started to return to Jarabulus in Syria, after Turkish-backed rebels recaptured the region from ISIL, marking the first formal return of civilians since Turkey launched Operation Euphrates Shield.

As of 14 September, a total of 1,900 Syrian refugees returned to the area cleansed by Turkish-backed forces, mainly to Jarabulus and Al Rai. On 17 September the Mountain Hawks Brigade announced that it had withdrawn from the Jarabulus and al-Rai fronts and its fighters and equipment will be transferred to the fronts in Aleppo city, Hama, and Latakia. (see also Northern al-Bab offensive (September 2016)) On 5 October, FSA primarily driven by the Sultan Murad Division, took control of four more villages from ISIL and, with the Turkish Special Forces, reportedly entered the small and strategic town of Akhtarin, easing the way for a planned attack on the iconic town of Dabiq. The town was captured by them on 6 October.

After taking control of the supply route between Al-Bab and Dabiq by taking Akhtarin and its vicinity, on 9 October, Turkey and the affiliated rebels announced that the area between Mare, Akhtarin and Kafrghan, an area which contains two important IS-held locations, Sawran and Dabiq, a military zone. On the same day the offensive started from three different fronts towards Dabiq, from north, south and east of the city and seven villages were taken by FSA forces.

On 10 October, Turkish forces and Turkish-backed rebels made significant advances and established control in all settlements on the way to the town of Sawran from its north and northwest, and started pushing into the town of Ihtamillat, the last settlement east of Sawran. One week later, following heavy clashes around the area, on 16 October, the FSA, headed by Sultan Murad Division, first took control of Sawran and continued towards Dabiq. Soon after Sawran, Dabiq was also taken and rebel forces went as south as Asunbul to secure the newly acquired area before proceeding to the next stage of the offensive targeting Qabasin and Bab.

On 17 October, Turkish troops and SNA forces started their offensive headed towards al-Bab and captured 7 villages in the first day, namely; Guzhe, Baruze, al-Wash, Aq Burhan, Qar Kalbin, Talatayna and Shudud. On 18 October, the Northern Thunder Brigade issued an ultimatum to the "PKK" and the Army of Revolutionaries, warning them to leave Tell Rifaat within 48 hours after which they will attack the town. On 22 October, Turkish-backed rebels surrounded Shaykh Issa, just east of Tell Rifaat. Turkish artillery shelling and air strikes mainly focused on Tell Rifaat, Shaykh Issa and villages under SDF control in western al-Bab. Turkish tanks entered Syria also from the west, from Hatay region into Idlib region, to the southernmost point of the PYD-held Afrin canton and positioned on hills overlooking Tel Rifat and Afrin. By 25 October, it became evident that the SDF had repelled all assaults by Turkish-backed rebels on villages and positions under its control.

==== Participation in Aleppo offensives (September–December) ====
Mainstream Western news sources in September and October 2016 suggested that "the Free Syrian Army" still exist as considerable army or structure of militias by mentioning or suggesting a role of the FSA in two offensives around Aleppo. In the Syrian government's offensive late September 2016 on (eastern) Aleppo, according to The New York Times, some of the defending rebel groups identified themselves as Free Syrian Army (FSA).

During the October–November Aleppo offensive of rebel forces against the Syrian Assad government forces, the French Le Figaro wrote: "On 22 October 2016, violence again broke out in Aleppo between the regime forces and the rebels. (...) The insurgent groups, dominated by Al-Nusra Front ('Front for the Conquest'), have called for a general mobilization of the fighters of East-Aleppo. The moderates of the Free Syrian Army have advised the inhabitants of West-Aleppo to keep at distance from government buildings." The Dutch NRC Handelsblad wrote: "Syrian rebel groups have on 28 October started a large offensive to break the siege of East-Aleppo. The Free Syrian Army declared: "It will be a large battle, with all rebel groups taking part"." The New York Times wrote: "Syrian rebels counter-attacked the [Syrian] army on 28 October, aiming to break a siege on eastern Aleppo (...) The assault included Jabhat Fateh al-Sham and groups fighting under the Free Syrian Army banner."

On 14 November 2016, Reuters reported that earlier in November the "Zinki group and the allied jihadist Jabhat Fateh al-Sham tried to crush the Fastaqim faction, which is part of the FSA" in eastern Aleppo.

=== 2017 – internal divisions, rise of Syrian National Army ===
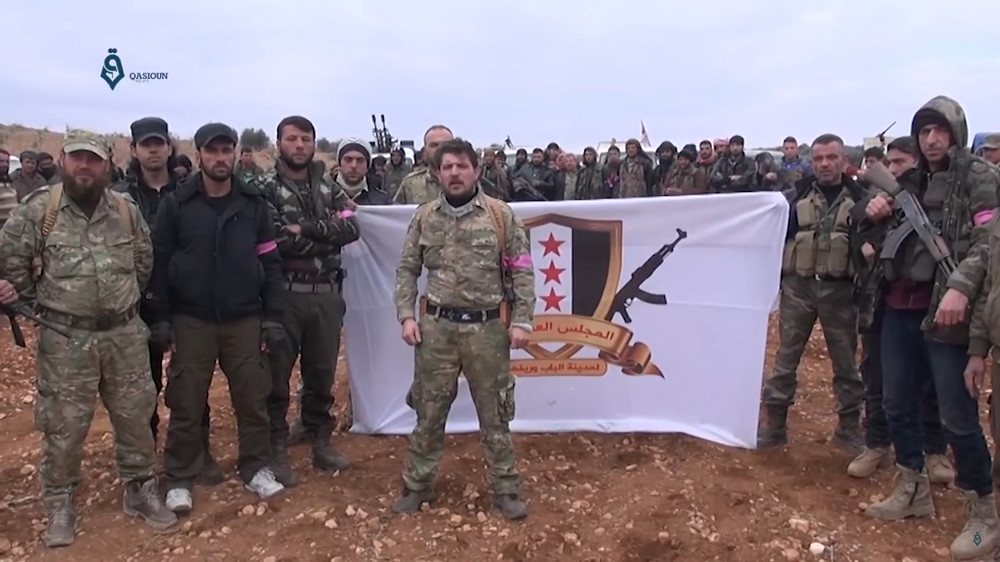
Syrian National Army fighters during the Battle of al-Bab

The year 2017 saw the FSA further divided. Rebel factions operating under the banner of the Syrian Interim Government have reorganized and merged in a unified armed group. Jawad Abu Hatab, the head of the opposition's Interim government and the Defense Minister, announced its official formation after meeting with moderate rebel commanders in the town of Azaz in Aleppo province. The newly formed body has 22,000 fighters, some of them have been trained and equipped by Turkey.

On 23 February 2017, the important city of al-Bab was completely captured from ISIL by the SNA, along with the towns of Qabasin and Bizaah. As of 25 February 2017, 50,000 Syrian refugees in Turkey have returned to the areas which were taken from ISIL by the SNA.

Also, in the south of the country at the frontier with Jordan, FSA units (the largest being Southern Front) remained on frontlines with the Syrian government and ISIL in Daraa and Quneitra Governorates.

On the other hand, in September 2017, the founder of the FSA, Col. Riad al-Asaad, was appointed as deputy prime minister for military affairs of the Syrian Salvation Government (an alternative government of the Syrian Opposition seated within Idlib Governorate).

=== 2018 – FSA moved from pockets to North, Syrian National Army conquers new territories ===
On 21 February, the Ba'athist government began an operation to capture rebel-held Ghouta east of Damascus; the operation started with an intensive air campaign. On 7 April 2018, a chemical attack was reported in the city of Douma, with 70 people killed and 500 injured. On-site medics stated the cause of those deaths was exposure to chlorine and sarin gas. Following the incident, Syrian Ba'athist government forces entered and established control over the city of Douma. On 6 July, as a result of the Southern Syria offensive, which had begun in June, the Syrian Army backed by Russian forces reached the border with Jordan and captured the Nasib Border Crossing.

On 20 January, the SNA began a cross-border operation in the Kurdish-majority Afrin Canton and the Tel Rifaat Area of Shahba Canton in Northern Syria, against the Kurdish-led Democratic Union Party in Syria (PYD), its armed wing People's Protection Units (YPG), and Syrian Democratic Forces (SDF) positions. On 18 March, on the 58th day of the operation in Afrin, Operation Olive Branch, the SNA captured Afrin from the YPG. The battle was seen as an overall strategic victory, because it would open a ground corridor into nearby Idlib province.

=== 2019 – SNA offensive into north-eastern Syria ===
On 6 May, the Syrian Government, in coordination with the Russian Aerospace Forces, launched a ground offensive against rebel-held territories in Northwestern Syria, in response to what it stated were repeated attacks on government-held areas, carried out by those groups from within the demilitarized zone.

In October, the SNA launched an offensive code-named "Operation Peace Spring" against the Kurds and the Syrian Arab Army (SAA) in northeastern Syria. The SNA captured a total area of between 3,412 square kilometres (1,317 sq mi) and 4,220 square kilometres (1,630 sq mi), and, according to the SOHR, 68 settlements including Ras al-Ayn, Tell Abyad, Suluk, Mabrouka and Manajir and cut the M4 highway

=== 2020 – FSA clashes with government troops in Daraa and Nagorno-Karabakh war ===
==== FSA clashes with government troops in Daraa ====
Map showing the Daraa insurgency attacks

On 1 March, the March 2020 Daraa clashes began. Clashes began after the start of a government security operation against FSA insurgent cells in Al-Sanamayn and other areas in the Daraa governorate that have been active since 2018. This crackdown led to actions of retaliation by rebels across the province that led to levels of fighting unseen on such a scale since the government offensive in 2018. On 29 February 2020, the Syrian military mobilized units from the 4th armored division and 9th armored division in preparation for a security operation in the western areas of the town of Al-Sanamayn, where rebels were present. The next day, on 1 March, Sanamayn was besieged by the Syrian military which launched a security operation against insurgent cells in the city, leading to heavy fighting that left three civilians dead. In response to the military operation, rebel attacks were conducted in the western and eastern countryside of Daraa. The rebels attacked and seized an Army checkpoint in the Jaleen Housing district, a suburb in western Daraa city, capturing four officers. The FSA fighters also captured two soldiers of the fourth division in Al-Karak al-Sharqi and blocked routes west of Daraa. The Syrian Army attempted to storm the town of Tafas where three rebels were killed by tank fire.

The rebels also seized checkpoints in the towns of Karak and al-Joulan, taking hostage several members of Air Force Intelligence. In the town of Muzayrib, rebels seized all entrances and took control of a government building there. They also set up roadblocks in Nawa, Muzayrib and Karak. A soldier was killed in front of his home in Daraa al-Balad by unknown gunmen and the bodies of three soldiers were found in the western countryside.

By the following day, seven rebels and seven civilians were killed in the clashes in Al-Sanamayn. The government forces withdrew from Jaleen back to their barracks after three soldiers were killed. Later that day, the Syrian Army and loyalists began shelling the town, killing eight civilians and injuring four others. The Syrian Army also shelled the town of Tasil.

Tensions escalated as violence erupted between government forces and a local Druze armed group named "Sheikh al-Karama" in the province of Suwayda. On 26 March, the group Sheikh al-Karama clashed with government forces at a checkpoint near the city of Salkhad in As-Suwayda governorate. One Syrian soldier and four local fighters were confirmed killed in the clashes. On 27 March, violent clashes took place after gunmen from Bosra al-Sham attempted to infiltrate the province and attacked the town of Al-Quraya. They were repelled by the Syrian Army and pro-government local factions. Four of the attackers and ten members of the local factions were killed in the clashes, and six fighters were captured.

==== Nagorno-Karabakh war ====
Syrian mercenaries associated with the FSA were reported by various sources fighting alongside Azerbaijan in the 2020 Nagorno-Karabakh war against Armenia prompting concerns from notable adversaries of the FSA, Russia and Iran, Turkey and Azerbaijan have denied using Syrian mercenaries, and in turn accused Armenia of using members from the Kurdistan Workers' Party (PKK) and Armenian Secret Army for the Liberation of Armenia (ASALA). The PKK denied the allegations.

The Syrian Observatory for Human Rights reported that at least 541 Syrian Rebels were killed during the 2020 Nagorno Karabakh war.

=== 2021 – continued clashes between FSA and government troops in Daraa ===
Locations of the clashes

In 2021, there were heavy clashes between FSA and Syrian government forces throughout the Daraa Governorate, particularly in the Daraa al-Balad neighborhood, which was besieged by government troops. The clashes were the fiercest Daraa had witnessed since the Syrian Army 2018 offensive. The persistent siege of government led to extortionate prices on goods and limited availability of drinking water.

The Syrian Army started to fire artillery shells towards FSA cells in Daraa city on 29 July 2021. Syrian Army sources described the attack as "start of a military operation against hideouts of terrorists who thwarted a reconciliation deal." In contrast, pro-opposition figures accused the government of failure to adhere to the agreement including promises to stay out of al-Balad district.

The government's operation led to actions of retaliation by rebels across the province. The fighters involved in the attack are former rebel fighters that surrendered to the government in 2018, as well as former rebels that defected to the government, and had been working against the government from within. Anti-government fighters seized several checkpoints and captured many surprised Syrian Army soldiers and Military Intelligence Directorate agents. While the Syrian Army's 4th Division was leading the anti-rebel operations, the overrun checkpoints mostly belonged to the 5th Division, 9th Division, and Air Force Intelligence Directorate. Overall, 18 positions in the countryside east and west of Daraa were captured by armed locals.

Both sides agreed to a ceasefire for 30–31 July after negotiations organized by the Russians and military officer Ahmad al-Awda. On 31 July, the situation remained tense, but most areas adhered to the ceasefire. There were sporadic instances of government forces firing at residential areas in Daraa al-Balad, Jasim, Muzayrib, and near Tafas, while an armed group consisting of ex-insurgents organized a curfew in al-Shajara. On 5 August, after several days of tense calm, rebels targeted a Syrian army vehicle on the road between Nahtah and Basr al-Harir in eastern Daraa countryside, leaving a soldier dead and 6 others wounded. There was also reported rocket fire by the Syrian army, targeting the town of Nahtah. On 14 August, hours before talks were set to take place between the Central Committee and Russian delegations, the Syrian Army bombarded Daraa al-Balad, killing one civilian. On 16 August, a member of the Syrian Army's 4th Division was shot dead by unknown gunmen in Maskin city in the north-western countryside of Daraa. A civilian was also killed by gunmen in al-Sanamayn city, after being accused of "dealing with the military security service and snitching on oppositionists".

On 19 August, an IED targeted a Syrian army convoy of the 112th Brigade on the al-Shabrouq road between the two towns of Nafaa and Ain Zakr in west of Daraa countryside, killing 6 Syrian soldiers and militiamen, including a brigadier. On 20 August, Syrian artillery shelling in Daraa al-Balad killed Mohamed Hilal Zatima, a reconciled commander of the Free Syrian Army. On 26 August, one Syrian soldier was killed and 4 others were wounded after an IED exploded targeting a Syrian army vehicle on the road between Nawa and Sheikh Maskeen. This follows Syrian army bombardments on Tafas city, resulting in the death of 2 civilians and the injury of several others. On 27 August 6 members of the reconciled 5th Corps, including a commander, were killed in a Syrian army ambush at al-Ruba'i checkpoint between al-Msifrah and al-Jizah. Fierce fighting between FSA and the Syrian army took place on the frontline of al-Kaziyah in al-Mansheya area in Daraa al-Balad shortly after.

Between 29 and 30 August 7 Syrian soldiers were killed in clashes with FSA along with 12 others wounded throughout Daraa province. These events come prior to Syrian army shelling on the besieged Daraa al-Balad, that left civilian casualties.

Protests were held in support of the rebels in Daraa in the opposition-held cities of Idlib and al-Bab. On 3 August, the main road connecting Arbin, Mesraba and Madira, in the Ghouta region of Rif Dimashq was cut by rebel supporters for a day before the army was deployed to the region.

=== 2024 ===
In December 2024, after the fall of the Assad government, the founding leader of FSA, Riad al-Asaad, returned to the Syrian capital of Damascus. He said that the Free Syrian Army (FSA) had been working closely with Islamist group Hayat Tahrir al-Sham (HTS), and he was later promoted to the role of Brigadier General as part of the new Syrian Army.

== Armed groups with the Free Syrian Army ==
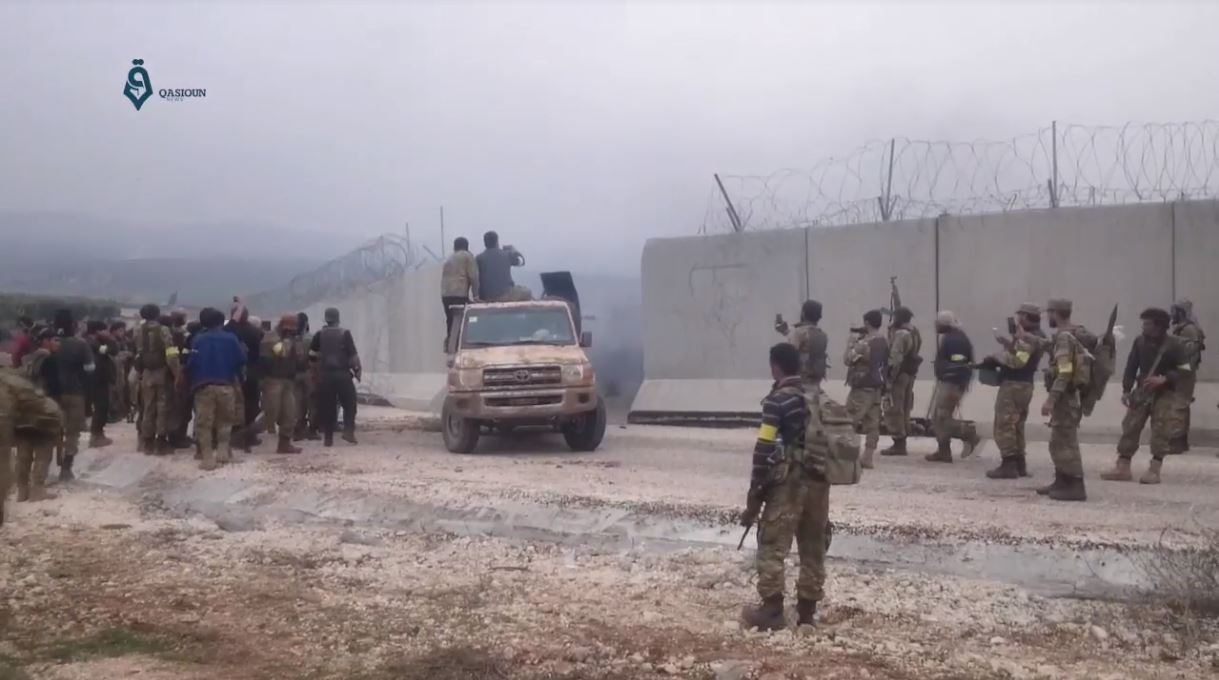
Free Syrian Army fighters near Jandiris district northern Aleppo's countryside, 11 February 2018

=== Original FSA units ===
During the announcement of the formation of the FSA by Riad al-Asaad on 29 July 2011, he listed 4 small subunits which claimed to the founding members of the FSA:

- Hamza al-Khateeb Battalion
- Freedom Battalion
- Saladin Battalion
- Al-Qashash Battalion

=== Notable FSA groups ===
==== Northwestern Syria ====
- Sultan Suleiman Shah Division is a Syrian Turkmen militia formed in 2011, previously under the name Fireline Brigade, and a member of the Syrian Turkmen Brigades supported by Turkey.
- Hamza Division is a rebel group formed in 2013 operating in Aleppo Governorate which identifies as part of the FSA. It is trained and equipped by the US and Turkey and one of its subgroup has received TOW missiles.
- Jaysh al-Izza is an Islamist rebel group mainly operating in Hama that was formed in 2013 and identifies as part of the FSA.
- Sultan Murad Division is one of the Syrian Turkmen Brigades formed in 2013 and majorly supported by Turkey since 2015.
- Sultan Mehmed the Conqueror Brigade is a Syrian Turkmen militant group formed in 2013, briefly joined the Sultan Murad Division from 2015 to 2016, and named after sultan Mehmed II, the Ottoman ruler who conquered Constantinople.
- Muntasir Billah Division is a mostly ethnic Turkmen Free Syrian Army militia active predominantly in Northern Aleppo Governorate since 2013.
- Al-Rahman Legion was a large Islamist rebel group that identifies as part of the FSA, formerly operating in the Damascus suburbs before being forced to retreat to the Northern Aleppo Governorate to join the Syrian National Army.
- 9th Special Forces Division of Aleppo is an FSA faction formed around late 2013, initially affiliated to the Syrian Revolutionaries Front, before joining the Hazzm Movement in 2014 and representing the group's only major remaining subgroup following Hazm's dissolution in 2015.
- Freedom Brigade is a rebel faction based in the Idlib Governorate, formed sometime in early-mid 2015.
- Al-Mu'tasim Brigade is a FSA group established in 2015 and has become famous for its comprehensive arsenal of U.S. provided weaponry.
- Central Division is a rebel group formed in 2015 operating in Idlib Governorate and Hama Governorate.
- Jaysh al-Nasr is a large rebel group formed in 2015 operating in northwestern Syria under the banner of the FSA.
- Jaysh al-Nukhba is a rebel group established in February 2016 and operating in Hama, Idlib, and Aleppo.
- Levant Front was originally an independent Sunni Islamist and Salafist coalition that operated around Aleppo and Azaz consisting of the Islamic Front, Harakat Nour al-Din al-Zenki, the FSA-labelled Fastaqim Union and Liwa Ahrar Souriya, and the Authenticity and Development Front. Soon after, all of the original groups left and the Levant Front became defunct. However, a new Levant Front was formed by the Hazzm Movement, the Thuwar al-Sham Battalions, the former al-Tawhid Brigade, and the Northern Storm Brigade, with the new group beginning to identify as part of the FSA in early 2016.
- Sham Legion is an alliance of Sunni Islamist rebel groups formed from 19 different groups in March 2014, and affiliated with the FSA since early 2016.
- 51st Division is a rebel militia affiliated to the FSA active since 2016 and headquartered around the village of Susyan, Aleppo Governorate.
- Jaysh al-Thani is a militia group formed from several brigades of Jaysh al-Nukhba in mid 2016, primally operating in the Greater Idlib Area.
- Ahrar al-Sharqiya is a hardline Salafist group founded in September 2016 from an Ahrar al-Sham unit, and identifies as part of the FSA
- Northern Brigade is a rebel group operating primally in Northern Aleppo Governorate formed in 2016 within the Sham Legion, before being dismissed from its ranks in May of 2017. The group continued operating under the FSA as an independent group, becoming one of Turkey's closest allies in the region.
- Jaysh al-Sharqiya is an Islamist group formed in 2017, primarily made up of Salafist fighters from Eastern Syria.
- Glory Corps is an Islamist faction formed in 2017, operating in the Northern Aleppo Governorate.
- Jaysh al-Ahfad is a rebel group formed from remnants of the Ahfad al-Rasul Brigades in either late 2016, or formed in late 2017 within the Syrian National Army.
- Al-Waqqas Brigade is an FSA militia formed around early 2018, first taking part in Operation Olive Branch as part of the SNA.
- 1st Infantry Division, is an Idlib Governorate-based FSA faction that took part in the defense of Idlib during the Northwestern Syria campaign (October 2017 – February 2018).
- Free Hayan Brigade is a small rebel militia formed in August, 2018, operating in the Idlib Governorate area.
- Liwa Ahrar al-Sham is a moderate rebel militia group in August, 2018, operating in the Idlib Governorate area.
- Peace Brigade is the non-ideological successor to the Fastaqim Union, formed in 2018 and operating in the northern Aleppo Governorate.
- 60th Infantry Division is an FSA group formed from the merger of the Free Idlib Army and the 23rd Division in November, 2023.
- Coastal Division is an FSA faction formed from the merger of the 1st Coastal Division and 2nd Coastal Division in November, 2023.

==== Southern Syria ====
- Forces of Martyr Ahmad al-Abdo is a rebel group formed in 2013 operating in Rif Dimashq Governorate, with most of its forces having relocated to northern Syria while maintiang a small contingent in the Al-Tanf US Military base in southern Syria.
- Lions of the East Army is a rebel faction established in 2014, originally active in eastern Syria that later relocated many of its fighters to northern Syria while maintaining a strategic presence at the U.S.-backed Al-Tanf base in the southeastern desert.
- Army of Free Tribes is/was an alliance of pro-FSA tribes formerly operating in the Southwest Syria Front and hosted at the Al-Tanf US military base.
- Syrian Free Army is a rebel group founded by the United States in 2015 and operating in eastern Syria which considers itself to be part of the FSA.
- Qaryatayn Martyrs Brigade is/was a rebel group formerly operating in the Eastern Qalamoun Mountains and hosted at the Al-Tanf US military base.

==== Eastern Syria ====
- Burkan al-Furat is a US-backed militia formed in 2023 from former SNA and FSA fighters, operating primarily in the Deir ez-Zor Governorate and later the Damascus and Latakia Governorates.

==== SDF Aligned ====
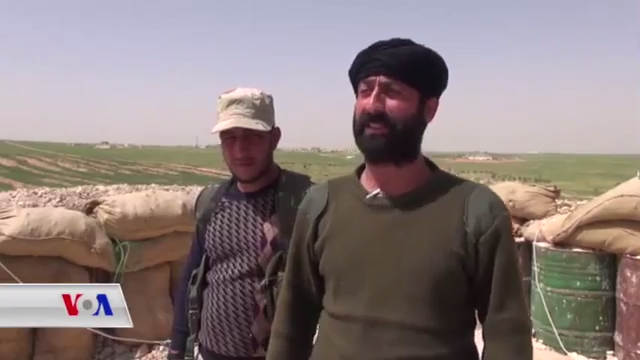
Abu Layla (right) was one of the most prominent FSA commanders among the Syrian Democratic Forces. Of mixed Kurdish–Arab origin, he fought with the Free Syria Brigade, Kurdish Front, and Northern Sun Battalion until being killed during the Manbij offensive.

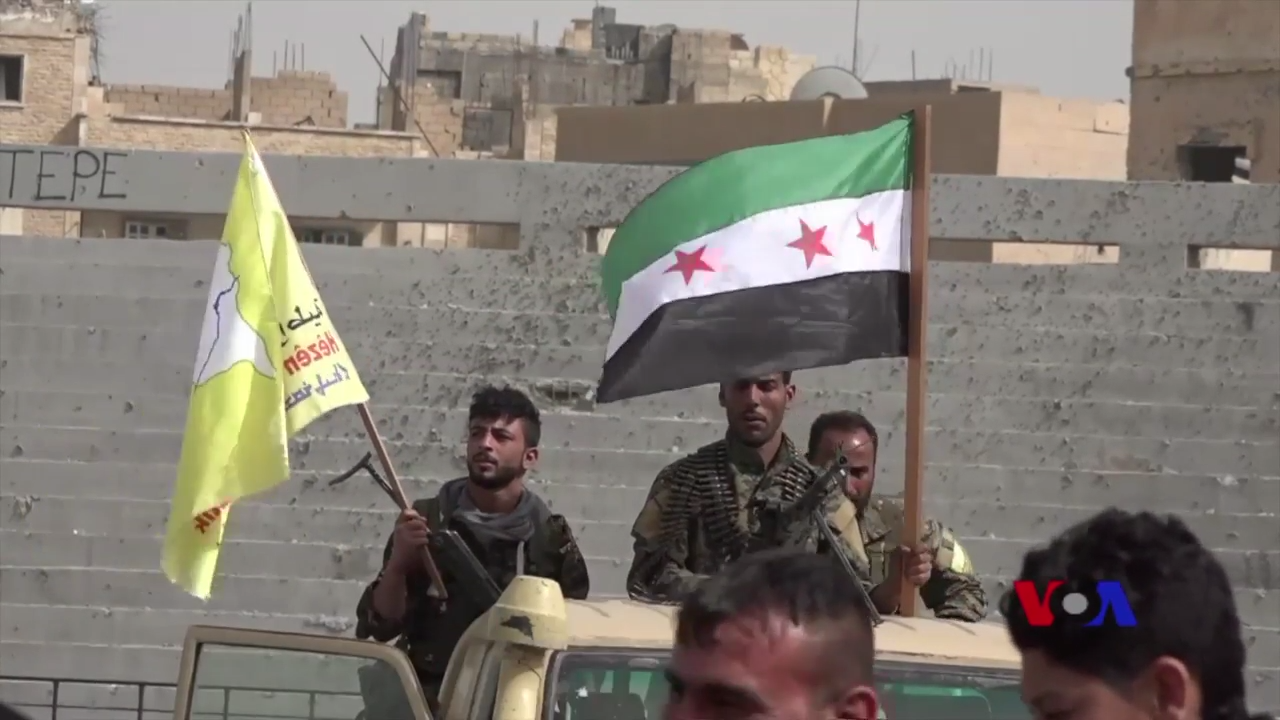
FSA SDF fighters after the capture of Raqqa stadium

- Euphrates Jarabulus Brigades continue to use the FSA designation since becoming part of the Syrian Democratic Forces in November 2015.
- Liwa Ahrar al-Raqqa is a FSA unit originating from the Raqqa Governorate, but also active in the eastern Aleppo Governorate and part of the SDF since 2015.
- Liberation Brigade is a rebel militia formed in the city of Ras al-Ayn, part of the northern Hasakah Governorate in September 2014, joining Euphrates Volcano, the precursor to the SDF, in 2014.
- Army of Revolutionaries is a rebel coalition established in May 2015 and operating throughout northwestern Syria, part of the Syrian Democratic Forces since its October 2015 founding, and continues to identify as part of the FSA.
- Northern Democratic Brigade is an FSA group formed in 2013, joining the SDF in 2015, along with aligning itself with the ideology of democratic confederalism

==== Unknown Status ====
- 21st Combined Force was a rebel group that was an early operator of TOW missiles, with the group's last public statement being in January 2017.
- Sham Liberation Army was/is a FSA group founded in 2015 by a Syrian Army captain defector, Firas Bitar, with their primary theater being along the Lebanon–Syria border, up until their retreat from the Eastern Qalamoun Mountains to Northern Aleppo Governorate.
- 1st Regiment was/is an Islamist rebel group formed in 2015 and primarily active in the Aleppo Governorate. The group's activities as part of the Syrian National Army haven't been documented since late 2019.
- Authenticity and Development Front was/is a moderate Islamist rebel faction formed in November, 2012, and aligned under the FSA umbrella since 2016. The ADF's status is currently unclear as the group hasn't been reported on since October, 2019.

==== Former groups ====
- Suqour al-Sham Brigades is a coalition of is an Islamist brigades that fought under the Free Syrian Army Umbrella up until their departure from the group to join the Islamic Front in late 2013
- Jaysh al-Islam is a Salafi Islamist group that fought as an early FSA group before breaking away and joining the Islamic Front in late 2013
- Al-Tawhid Brigade identified as part of the FSA in mid-2012, joined the Syrian Islamic Liberation Front Islamist FSA coalition in 2012 and later left the FSA for the Islamic Front in late 2013.
- Syrian Revolutionaries Front was an alliance of 14 relatively moderate religious and some secular armed groups fighting under the banner of the FSA, formed in December 2013, with its northern sector dissolving following major clashes with Al-Nusra Front in 2015, while its southern sector was defeated by the Syrian Army in July, 2018 during the 2018 Southern Syria offensive.
- Syrian Salvation Front was a rebel faction formed around 2014, and active in the Northwest Syria area until dissolving after a major FSA defeat in 2015 during the Al-Nusra Front–SRF/Hazzm Movement conflict.
- Hazzm Movement was a US-backed rebel group armed with TOW missiles which was devastated by clashes with Al-Nusra Front and dissolved in March 2015.
- Fastaqim Union was an Islamist group in primarily operating in Aleppo, with the group getting picked apart by the Nour al-Din al-Zenki Movement capturing their main bases and headquarters in late 2016.
- Army of Mujahideen was an Islamist coalition faction composed of moderate Islamist FSA groups, before joining Ahrar al-Sham in 2017.
- Descendants of Saladin Brigade was a Kurdish majority group operating primarily in the Northern Aleppo Governorate, with the faction being forced to dissolve due to major attacks from Turkish-backed groups due to alleged affialtion with al-Qaeda and the Democratic Union Party
- Nour al-Din al-Zenki Movement is an Islamist group that was aligned with the FSA since at least 2012, ending its affiliation with the FSA in 2017 to join HTS.
- Southern Front was an alliance of rebel groups in southern Syria, ranging from secularist to moderately Islamist, and considers itself to be the southern branch of the FSA. It had 54 affiliated groups in mid-2015 and 25–30,000 fighters in 58 groups by mid-2016. The coalition would dissolve due to a crippling defeat at the hands of the Syrian Army during the 2018 Southern Syria offensive.
- Free Idlib Army was a group created in September 2016 as an umbrella for three FSA-identified groups in northwestern Syria and fought primarily in the Idlib Governorate up until 2023, where it merged with the 23rd Division into the 60th Infantry Division.
- 23rd Division, formerly known as the 16th Division, was a rebel group operating around the city of Aleppo and the Idlib Governorate up until 2023, where it merged with the Free Idlib Army into the 60th Infantry Division.
- 1st Coastal Division was a rebel FSA unit made up of a mix of Arabs and Syrian Turkmen that was an early operator and among the most prolific and effective users of TOW missiles, supplied by the US and Qatar up until 2023, where it merged with the 2nd Coastal Division into the Coastal Division.
- 2nd Coastal Division was a Pan-Turkist FSA group, affiliated with the Syrian Turkmen Brigades and with its origins in the Latakia Governorate, up until 2023, where it merged with the 1st Coastal Division into the Coastal Division.

== International support for Free Syrian Army groups ==
The Obama administration of the United States admitted to militarily supporting some, so-called "moderate", groups fighting under the banner of the FSA. FSA is said to have received substantial weapons, financing and other support from the Obama administration of the United States, Turkey, the United Kingdom, Saudi Arabia and the other Gulf states. Hamas was also reported to have trained some elements of the FSA but its rival the Palestinian Authority maintained good relations with the Syrian President throughout the Syrian Civil War.

Israel's stance on the Free Syrian Army changed throughout the Syrian civil war as the FSA had elements who claimed they supported the Palestinians and rejected normalizing relations with Israel. In 2012, Free Syrian Army accused Israel of helping and aiding the Syrian government. But in 2019, a former IDF Chief alleged that Israel funded a Syrian rebel faction called Fursan al-Joulan which claimed to be loosely affiliated with the Free Syrian Army. This is despite the fact that Israel stated in 2015 that it had become neutral in ousting Bashar al-Assad from power

Norway has also supported the Free Syrian Army with anti-terror co-operation, military training and more. Norwegian forces did also fight off an extensive attack from ISIS, on the Tanf-base, near the Jordanian and Iraqi border. Support for the FSA in the United States ceased under the Trump administration beginning in 2017.

=== Arms deliveries from U.S., Turkey, Qatar, Saudi Arabia, others ===
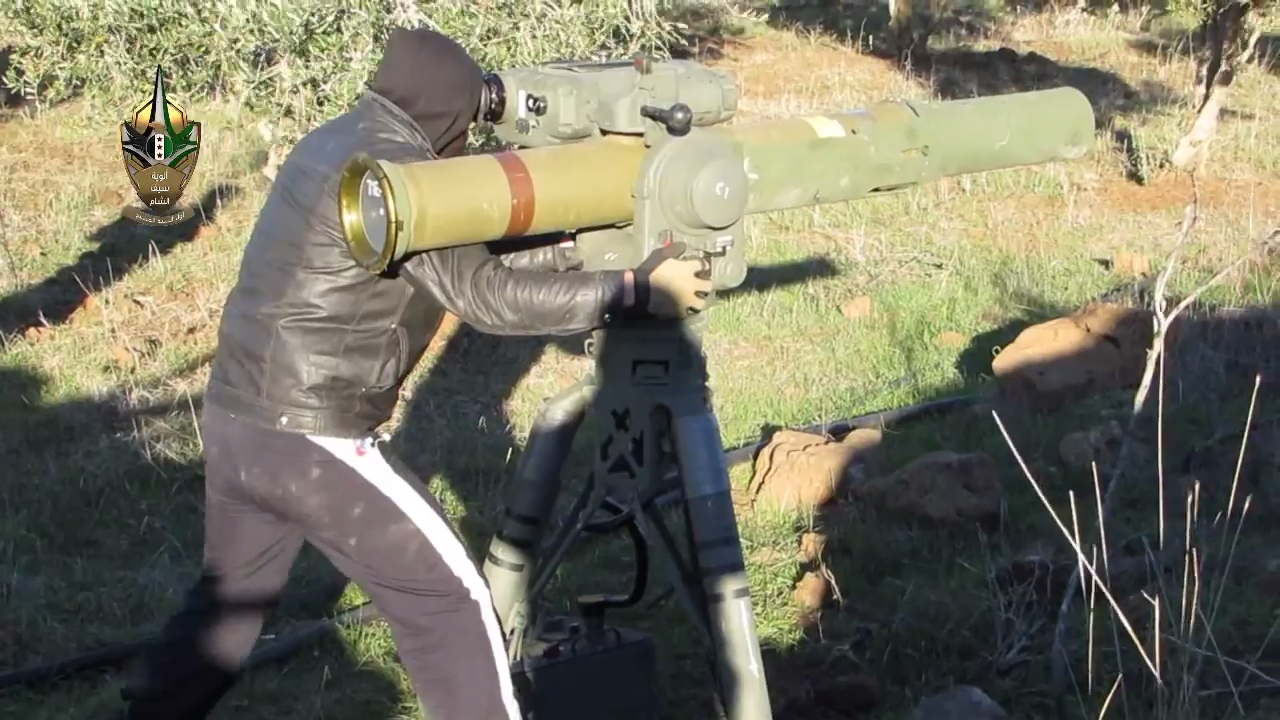
An FSA fighter in Jesus Christ Brigade prepares to launch an American-made anti-Tank BGM-71 TOW missile

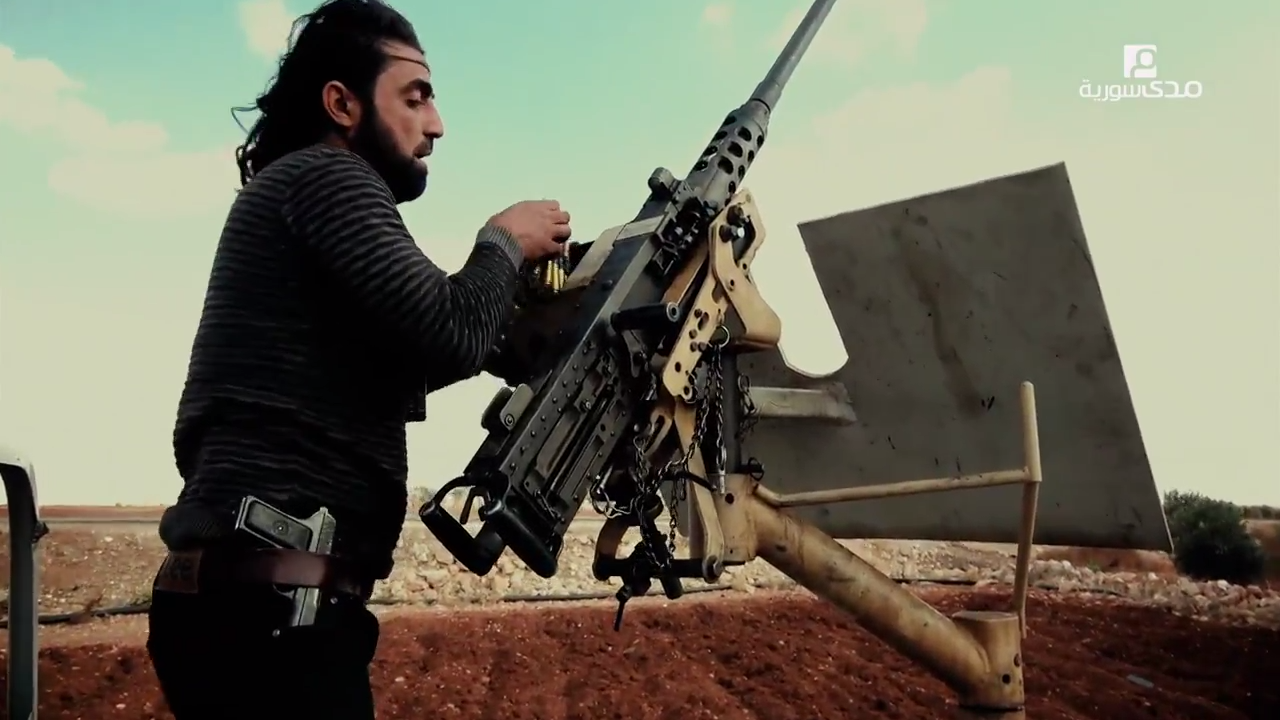
An FSA fighter loads a US-made M2 Browning heavy machine gun in northern Aleppo, November 2016.

In February 2012 Britain pledged to send advanced communications equipment to the FSA to help them coordinate their forces. On 1 March 2012, Kuwait's parliament declared support for the FSA. By mid-May, it was reported that, according to opposition activists and foreign officials, the FSA had started to receive significant financial support from the Persian Gulf nations for the purchase of arms.

In April 2012, the Lebanese Navy intercepted a Sierra Leone-registered vessel carrying a large number of arms and ammunition believed to be destined for the Free Syrian Army. Some of the arms were labeled as Libyan.

In July 2012 the Syrian Support Group based in Washington DC received clearance from the U.S. Treasury Department to fund the Free Syrian Army. As of August 2012, US President Obama started funding 'Syrian rebels' – presumably FSA—with money, weapons and goods.

In December 2012, security officials from the United States, United Kingdom, France, Germany, the Gulf Cooperation Council and Jordan were present at an FSA meeting that elected a new leadership council. By December 2012 the international diplomatic collective 'Friends of Syria Group' had pledged non-military aid to unspecified militant rebels.

Since December 2012, Saudi Arabia has supplied groups identifying with the FSA, in addition to other rebel groups, with weapons from Croatia. In April 2013, the US promised to funnel $123 million nonlethal aid to Syrian rebels through the Supreme Military Council, a then coordination body of FSA groups. In June 2013, rebels reported to have received 250 9M113 Konkurs anti-tank missiles with a range of 4 kilometers and accuracy of 90%.

In April 2014, according to Charles Lister at the U.S. Brookings Institution, 40 different rebel groups first began receiving U.S.-made BGM-71 TOW missiles costing $50,000 each, through the CIA. FSA-identified and other rebel groups posted videos of TOW missile launches online. In December 2014, the Institute for the Study of War reported that the U.S.-led Military Operations Command was leading training and assist missions for FSA groups in Daraa, at the Jordanian border.

The Washington Post stated in late 2014 that the US and European friends had "in recent years" given training, financial and military support to Syrian "rebel groups", more or less suggesting that FSA was among them. Also an ISIL commander then stated that FSA rebels who in 2014 ran over to ISIL had received training from United States', Turkish and Arab military officers at a NATO base in southern Turkey.

The Dutch government stated in December 2014 that the 59 countries strong US-led coalition that had convened in Brussels that month was militarily supporting "the moderate Syrian opposition". After being pressed by their Parliament to be more precise, they admitted that 'moderate Syrian opposition' meant: some, but not all, groups that are part of the Free Syrian Army – but squarely refused to name the FSA groups that were being supported.

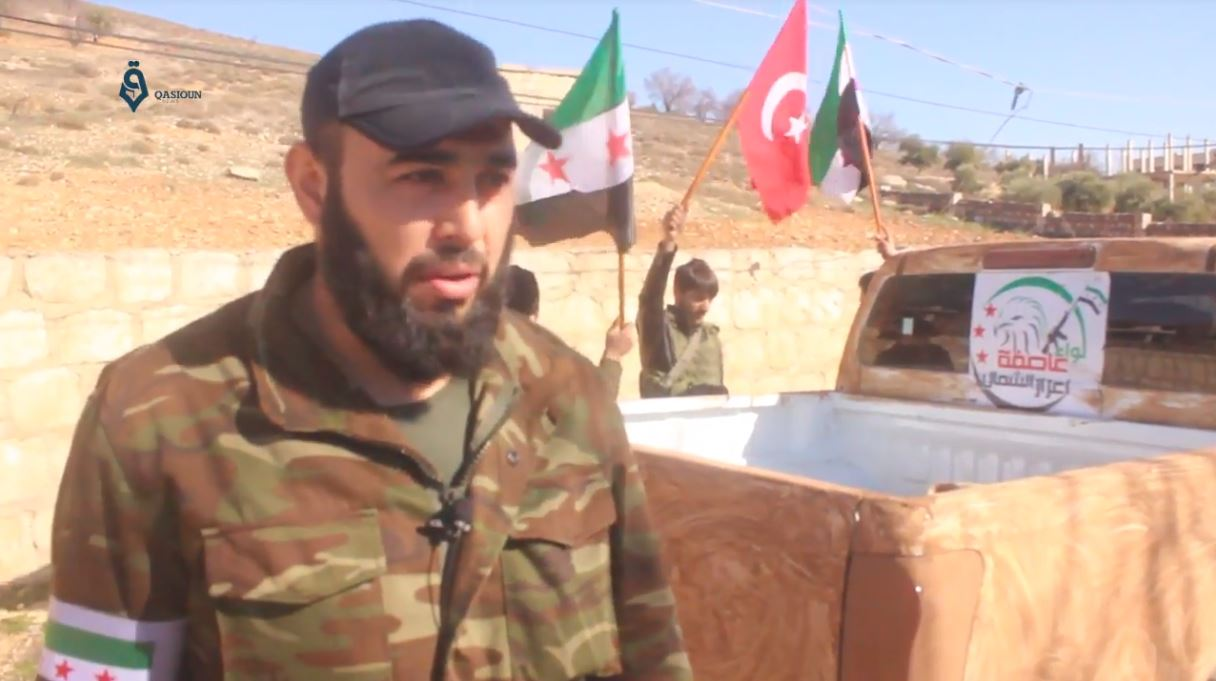
Fighters of the Northern Storm Brigade during the Turkish military operation in Afrin, February 2018

Since 2014, dozens of rebel groups that identified as part of the FSA in southern, central, and northern Syria have been provided with BGM-71 TOW missiles. In February 2015, The Carter Center listed 23 groups within the Southern Front of the Free Syrian Army that have been documented using US-supplied TOWs. Groups provided with TOWs in northern and central Syria include the Hazzm Movement, the 13th Division, Syria Revolutionaries Front, Yarmouk Army, Knights of Justice Brigade, and the 101st Division.

In 2015, the International Business Times wrote the U.S. has sent weapons shipments to FSA-identified groups through a U.S. CIA program for years. In October 2015 Reuters reported that the U.S. (CIA) and allied countries had broadened the number of rebel groups clandestinely receiving TOW missiles. The International Business Times reported that TOW missile attacks against Syrian government tanks increased by 850% between September and October 2015. Rebel groups associated with the FSA in November 2015 released numerous videos showing them launching TOW missiles against Syrian government forces. According to Russian and Syrian sources, the missiles were delivered through Turkish territory.

In October 2015 Reuters reported that the U.S., Saudi Arabia and Qatar had broadened the number of rebel groups clandestinely receiving TOW missiles. Also the BBC reported in October 2015 that a Saudi official confirmed the delivery of 500 TOW missiles to FSA fighters.

The U.S. supplied a considerable amount of weapons and ammunition, generally of Soviet-type from Eastern Europe, to Syrian rebel groups under operation Timber Sycamore. For example, Jane's Defence Weekly reported a December 2015 shipment of 994 tonnes of weapons and ammunition (including packaging and container weight) to Syrian rebel groups. A detailed list of weapon types and shipment weights had been obtained from the U.S. government's Federal Business Opportunities website.

=== Foreign combatants ===
The Libyan National Transitional Council in November 2011 reportedly dispatched 600 fighters or more of the Libyan National Liberation Army to the Free Syrian Army, entering Syria through Turkey.

The number of foreign militants active within the FSA is hard to assess. In late May 2012, based on interviews with FSA fighters, it was reported that 300 Lebanese had joined the FSA. The presence of Algerians, Tunisians, Jordanians and fighters from Saudi Arabia was also confirmed. A leader of the FSA told an AFP correspondent that five Libyan combatants have been killed in clashes with the Syrian Army. The same leader, while denying the presence of many foreign fighters, said that there are few of different nationalities. Peter Harling, from the International Crisis Group, told the AFP that the proportion of foreign fighters is currently very small, but might grow after Saudi Arabia and Qatar announced their support for arming the rebels.

Croatian General Marinko Krešić confirmed that there are between 80 and 100 Croat mercenaries between the ages of 40 and 60 helping the Free Syrian Army. They are veterans from the Croatian War of Independence (1991–95) or Bosnian War (1992–95), but also fought as mercenaries in Iraq War (2003–11), Libyan Civil War, Tunisian revolution and Egyptian revolution. Krešić stated that some are serving as security, instructors while others are killing. He also stated that they are very well trained and that "they are the one who will probably kill rather than be killed". Krešić stated that their payment is up to 2,000 US$ a day due to "rich foreign donators". He also added that the majority of the volunteers coming from the Balkans to help the FSA are Croats and citizens of Bosnia and Herzegovina. Sources close to the Belgrade military circles confirmed that the former members of the Kosovo Liberation Army are also aiding the FSA. They are mostly instructors who train the rebels mostly for the urban and the guerrilla warfare. A first reported death of a member of the Kosovo Liberation Army was announced on 13 November. Naman Demoli, a former member of the KLA was killed near Syrian-Turkish border. According to Al Monitor, there exist also Turkmen Brigades within the FSA.

Dozens of Kuwaiti volunteers entering from Turkey fought in the ranks of the FSA. The volunteers were given Syrian IDs as a precautionary measure in case of arrest, before being armed and sent to fight in various locations in Syria.

== Decentralised fighting force: 2015–present ==
In September 2013, the U.S. broadcast network NBC News reported about the structure of FSA:

[FSA] is an army in name only. It is made up of hundreds of small units, some secular, some religious – whether mainstream or radical. Others are family gangs, or simply criminals. The FSA is by far the largest Syrian rebel force... Publicly, the FSA says it wants to oust Assad so that it can create a state that is prosperous and tolerant of its religious minorities, including the Alawites, who have ruled Syria for decades even though they make up less than 15 percent of the population. It also rejects, leaders say, the radical philosophy of al Qaeda-linked groups like the al-Nusra Front.

Since 2015, some journalists from The Independent began dismissing the unity of the command structure of FSA. In October 2015, Robert Fisk stated that the FSA had fallen to pieces and their fighters had defected to al-Nusra Front or ISIL or retired to the countryside maintaining a few scattered checkpoints, and stated that the US government had already admitted the disappearance of the FSA two months before. In the same month, his colleague Patrick Cockburn stated that "The Free Syrian Army was always a mosaic of factions and is now largely ineffectual."

In March 2015, Rami Jarrah, a prominent Syrian-British activist, claimed: "There is no such thing as the Free Syrian Army, people still use the term in Syria to make it seem like the rebels have some sort of structure. But there really isn't." In May 2015, an al-Nusra Front spokesman said that fighters identifying as FSA in southern Syria alone numbered roughly 60,000, although another Nusra leader in December 2015 denied the existence of the FSA to the astonishment and intense displeasure of FSA fighters throughout Syria on social media.

In June 2015, the International Business Times stated that since the emergence of ISIL on the Syrian battlefield in 2014, the FSA had "all but dissipated", and reported that the remnants of the FSA had joined the coalitions of the Army of Conquest (Islamist) and the Southern Front (ranging from secularist to moderate religious) in their assault on Dera'a, south of Damascus. In September 2015 a rebel colonel told CBS News that only a small proportion of US-approved fighters under a $500 million US aid program received training, weapons, and ammunition, and much of this material got taken over by the al-Nusra Front.

=== Cooperation with Russia against ISIS ===
According to Western sources – including the BBC and Reuters – on 30 September 2015, as part of its military intervention in Syria, Russia started air strikes on groups identified as part of the FSA despite offering "help" to the FSA in order to fight ISIS. Examples of attacked groups included ones such as the Mountain Hawks Brigade and the Army of Glory that had confirmed being hit by missiles from Russia airstrikes on the same day in September 2015. Various other FSA militia commanders also condemned Putin and Russian generals as "a bunch of liars", accusing them of striking their military checkpoints and headquarters.

Early October 2015, Russian state media reported Vladimir Putin's foreign minister Sergey Lavrov stating on Russia's cooperating with FSA on fighting ISIS:

"They tell us about the Free Syrian Army, but where is it? It remains a phantom group, nothing is known about it (...) I've asked [US Secretary of State] John Kerry to provide us with information about the whereabouts of this Free Syrian Army and who commands it".

Condemning Russian intervention as an illegal invasion, Issam al-Rayes, spokesman of FSA's Southern Front stated:

"Vladimir Putin, is assisting a regime that indiscriminately kills their own people.. How could we trust the Russians' help?.. If the Syrians stood with Assad he would not ask for invaders to come to Syria."

== Accusations of war crimes ==
On 20 March 2012, Human Rights Watch issued an open letter to the opposition (including the FSA), calling on them to stop carrying out unlawful kidnappings, torture and executions. The United Nations-sponsored "Independent International Commission of Inquiry on the Syrian Arab Republic" has documented war crimes in Syria since the start of the civil war. It said that rebels had committed war crimes, but that they "did not reach the gravity, frequency and scale" of those by state forces.

In 2012, the FSA was accused of summarily executing numerous prisoners who it claims are government soldiers or shabiha, and people who it claims are informers. A rebel commander in Damascus said that over the months his unit had executed perhaps 150 people that the "military council" had found to be informers. He explained: "If a man is accused of being an informer, he is judged by the military council. Then he is either executed or released". Nadim Houry, a Middle East researcher for Human Rights Watch argued that "Intentionally killing anyone, even a shabiha, once he is outside of combat is a war crime, regardless of how horrible the person may have been". On 10 August 2012, a report indicated that Human Rights Watch was investigating rebel forces for such killings. The FSA, for its part, stated that they would put those fighters that had conducted the unlawful killings on trial.

In 2012, witnesses also reported rebels conducting 'trial by grave' in which an alleged government soldier was given a mock trial next to a pre-made grave and executed on the spot by members of the FSA Amr bin al-Aas brigade. One rebel said: "We took him right to his grave and, after hearing the witnesses' statements, we shot him dead".

The Daoud Battalion, operating in the Jabal-al-Zawiya area, reportedly used captured soldiers in proxy bombings in 2012. This involved tying the captured soldier into a car loaded with explosives and forcing him to drive to an army checkpoint, where the explosives would be remotely detonated.

In 2012, the UN noted some credible allegations that rebel forces, including the FSA, were recruiting children as soldiers. One rebel commander said that his 16-year-old son had died fighting government troops.

In a video uploaded to the Internet in early August 2012, an FSA representative announced that, in response to international concerns, FSA units would follow the Geneva Convention's guidelines for the treatment of prisoners and would guarantee its captives food, medical attention and holding areas away from combat zones. He also invited Red Cross workers to inspect their detention facilities. On 8 August, after videoes showed FSA rebels conducting summary executions, FSA commanders distributed an 11-point code of conduct paper that states that all fighters must respect human rights.

Timeline of some prominent war crimes by groups considered to be part of the FSA:

- On 22 May 2012, the Northern Storm Brigade kidnapped 11 Lebanese pilgrims coming from Iran. Four of them were killed in an airstrike by the Syrian Air Force and the rest were released unharmed.
- On 20 July 2012, Iraq's deputy interior minister, Adnan al-Assadi, said that Iraqi border guards had witnessed the FSA take control of a border post, detain a Syrian Army lieutenant colonel, and then cut off his arms and legs before executing 22 Syrian soldiers.
- On 21 July 2012, Turkish truck drivers said that they had their trucks stolen by members of the FSA when it captured a border post. They said that some of the trucks were burnt and others sold back to their drivers after the goods were looted.
- The United Nations report on war crimes states that the FSA's execution of five Alawite soldiers in Latakia, post-July 2012 was a war crime. The report states, "In this instance, the FSA perpetrated the war crime of execution without due process."
- On 13 August 2012, a series of three videos surfaced showing executions of prisoners by rebel forces, in Aleppo province. In one video, six postal workers were being thrown off the main postal building in Al-Bab to their deaths by FSA fighters. The gunmen claimed they were shabiha.
- On 9 September 2012 the FSA exploded a car bomb near al-Hayat Hospital and the Central Hospital in Aleppo. According to Syrian state media, at least 30 people were killed and more than 64 wounded. The FSA claimed that the army had occupied the hospital buildings and were using them as a base.
- On 10 September 2012 the FSA's Hawks of Syria brigade executed more than 20 Syrian soldiers captured in Hanano military base.
- On 2 November 2012 the FSA's al-Siddiq Battalion kidnapped and executed prominent Syrian actor Mohammed Rafeh, claiming he was a member of the shabiha and was carrying a gun and military ID.
- In May 2013, a video was posted on the internet showing a rebel cutting organs from the dead body of a Syrian soldier and putting one in his mouth, "as if he is taking a bite out of it". He called rebels to follow his example and terrorize the Alawite sect, which mostly backs Assad. Humans Rights Watch (HRW) confirmed the authenticity of the footage, and stated that "The mutilation of the bodies of enemies is a war crime". The rebel was Khalid al-Hamad, known by his nom de guerre "Abu Sakkar", a commander of the Independent Omar al-Farouq Brigade. The BBC called it an offshoot of the FSA's Farouq Brigades, while HRW said it is "not known" whether the brigade is part of the FSA. The incident was condemned by the FSA's Chief of Staff and the Syrian National Coalition said that Abu Sakkar would be put on trial. Abu Sakkar said the mutilation was revenge. He claimed to have found a video on the soldier's cellphone in which the soldier sexually abuses a woman and her two daughters, along with other videos of Assad loyalists raping, torturing, dismembering and killing people, including children. He further stated that if the war was to continue, "all Syrian people" would be like him. He was killed in northwest Latakia province on 6 April 2016 by the Syrian Army, while being affiliated to the al-Qaeda linked Al-Nusra Front.
- In December 2012, militants abducted an NBC News Team of six journalists around NBC's chief foreign correspondent Richard Engel. Engel initially blamed pro-regime Shabiha militants, but it turned out the perpetrators were most likely the FSA-affiliated rebel group North Idlib Falcons Brigade.
- Since July 2013, the al-Nusra Front, at times in coordination with other armed groups, carried out a series of killings of Kurdish civilians in al-Youssoufiyah, Qamishli and al-Asadia (al-Hasakah). During a raid by ISIL, al-Nusra, the Islamic Front and FSA groups, fighters killed a Kurdish Yazidi man in al-Asadia who refused to convert to Islam.
- After their capture of the town of Jarabulus from ISIL in September 2016, opposition militias of the Sultan Murad Division published pictures of themselves torturing four YPG members prisoners of war, who were captured by the rebel group while, according to YPG claims, trying to evacuate civilians.
- The FSA group Army of Victory have taken civilians, including children, as prisoners, mainly from Latakia. 112 of them were released in February 2017 as part of a prisoner exchange.

=== Child soldiers ===
The FSA was mentioned in a 2014 Human Rights Watch report detailing the widespread practise of using child soldiers by non-state armed groups; the report interviewed children as young as 14 who fought with the FSA.

In 2014, the United Nations verified that the Free Syrian army had recruited more than 142 child soldiers. The UN reported stated "fragmentation of FSA resulted in localized and variable recruitment, training and salary practices. During armed battles, children were used for fighting, attending to the wounded or for recording events for propaganda purposes."

In 2016, the United Nations verified another 62 cases where Free Syrian Army had recruited and used child soldiers.

== See also ==
- List of armed groups in the Syrian Civil War
- Syrian Armed Forces
- Syrian Democratic Forces
- Army of Conquest
- Islamic State of Iraq and the Levant
