= Daraa Governorate clashes (2011–2013) =

Series of military confrontations in Syria

2011–2013 Daraa Governorate clashes
- Part of the Early insurgency phase of the Syrian civil war and 2012–2013 phase of the Syrian civil war
- Approximate situation in Daraa governorate, mid-August 2012
| Date | 14 November 2011 – 3 January 2013 (1 year, 1 month, 2 weeks and 6 days) |
| Location | Daraa Governorate, Syria |
| Result | Syrian opposition victory: FSA captures several districts Daraa City, and other towns in the Daraa Province; 2012 Army counter-offensives; FSA forces launch an offensive to capture the entire governorate. |

Belligerents
| (Syrian opposition) Free Syrian Army (Syrian opposition) Opposition protesters | Ba'athist Syria; Syrian Arab Armed Forces |

Commanders and leaders
| (Syrian opposition) LTC. Yasser al-Abboud (Syrian opposition) Muammar Kaif | Gen. Mohsin Makhlouf; Col. Saleh Nejdah |

Units involved
| (Syrian opposition) Free Syrian Army; (Syrian opposition) Daraa Military Council | Syrian Arab Armed Forces; Syrian Arab Army; 5th Mechanized Division; 15th Mechanized Brigade; 4th Armoured Division; 555th SF (Airborne) Regiment; 61st Army Regiment; Syrian Arab Air Force; Air Force Intelligence Directorate; Syrian Public Security Police; Shabiha |

Strength
| 2,500 | 3,000 |

Casualties and losses
| ≈470 killed | 526 killed |
- at least 470 civilians and protesters killed, several dozen wounded and 190 detained

The Daraa 2011–2013 Daraa Governorate clashes were a series of military confrontations between the Syrian Arab Armed Forces and the Free Syrian Army in Daraa Governorate, Syria, which began in November 2011, after widescale protests and crackdown on protesters in Daraa had lasted since April 2011. The clashes had been ongoing as part of the Syrian civil war, until the U.N. brokered cease fire came into effect on 14 April 2012. Sporadic clashes continued since then, however.

Although there were some civilian protests, Arab League observers have been posted in the area, and one of them claimed to see snipers in the city. "We saw snipers in the town, we saw them with our own eyes," the observer told residents in a conversation filmed and posted online. "We're going to ask the government to remove them immediately. We'll be in touch with the Arab League back in Cairo. If the snipers are not gone in 24 hours, then there will be other measures taken." Civilian protesters have died.

On 16 February 2012, the army reportedly attacked Daraa, shelling the city heavily. This was apparently because, "Deraa has been regaining its role in the uprising. Demonstrations have resumed and the Free Syrian Army has been providing security for protests in some parts of the city." The attack was part of a security force push "to regain control of areas they lost in recent weeks", indicating FSA in Daraa had taken control of parts of the city. Security forces attacked at least three districts, but FSA fighters fought back, firing at army roadblocks and buildings housing security police and militiamen. An activist said that there had been a military build-up near Daraa for the previous two weeks. Images taken by residents appears to have shown military tanks in Daraa, and at least three security force members were initially killed in the fighting.

On 14 March 2012, fighters from the Free Syrian Army controlled at least 1 main district in the city of Daraa (Al-Balad district) which made the Syrian army attack it by firing anti-aircraft guns into buildings of the FSA-controlled district.

== Timeline ==
=== 2011 ===
On 14 November, Syrian army defectors ambushed regular Syrian army forces near the Jordanian border in the province of Daraa, which led to heavy fighting. The clashes went on for four hours. An opposition activist near the town of Khirbet Ghazaleh stated that he saw two destroyed armored personnel carriers and the bodies of 12 civilians. A total of 23 civilians were reported killed in the area. According to an opposition rights group, "Twenty-three people were shot dead by security forces posted along the road between the towns of Kherbet Ghazale and Hirak". 34 soldiers and 12 defectors were also killed in the fighting.

On 30 November, clashes occurred once again as security forces attempted a raid on the town of Dael, suffering seven dead and 19 wounded when their convoy of buses came under fire by the Free Syrian Army. According to the head of the Syrian observatory for human rights, Rami Abdel Rahman, two of the security force vehicles were blown up.

On 5 December, clashes in the province once again occurred, with four soldiers, (including an officer), being killed by Syrian army defectors.

On 11 December, fighting raged in the village of Busra al-Harir and in Lujah, an area of rocky hills north of the town, where defectors had been hiding and attacking military supply. Troops of the 12 Armored engaged hundreds of military defectors. Three military tanks were reportedly destroyed during the fighting.

In December, civilians in Daraa went on strike, in protest of the government, and Al Jazeera reported on 11 December that they heard reports that troops burned down at least 178 stores and shops in Daraa to try and take revenge against civilians who have shut down their stores and shops and are basically observing the general strike.

On 12 December, opposition sources reported army operations in the southern province of Deraa, very near the Jordanian border. SANA, the state news agency, reported three members of the security forces were killed in a clash with what they described as a "terrorist gang". Four "terrorists" were also killed, it said.

Three anti-regime military defectors were wounded in clashes with Syrian security forces in the village of Hirak in Daraa province on 14 December.

The FSA engaged loyalist army units and security service agents in Daraa on 15 December, leading to 27 loyalist deaths and an unknown number of FSA casualties. The clashes broke out at three separate checkpoints in the province around dawn.

Fourteen members of the security forces were killed on 20 December in the province.

The UK-based Syrian Observatory for Human Rights said at least 22 people were killed in clashes in the southern Deraa province on 21 December.

"Twenty-two people – six deserters, a civilian and 15 members of the armed forces and security forces – were killed and several dozen civilians were wounded in their homes," the group said.

On 28 December, clashes in Deraa were once again renewened, video surface and the Syrian Observatory for Human Rights reported that army defectors killed at least four Syrian soldiers in an ambush.

=== 2012 ===
Around 1 January, six protesters were shot dead by Syrian security forces.

On 4 January The British-based Syrian Observatory for Human Rights said that as dozens of soldiers were defecting in the southern village of Jassem, they came under fire from security forces in a clash that killed at least 18 government troops and an unknown number of FSA casualties. The Observatory said security forces later launched raids in the area, detaining more than 100 people. Also, the Syrian government claimed a bomb blast targeted a police patrol in the Daara countryside which killed a policeman and wounded five soldiers.

On 6 January, the Syrian Government claimed that men in military uniform launched an assault on Sur Police station in Daara province. This attack was said to have killed two policemen and wounded six others. The chief of the police station was allgedely one of those killed in the attack.

On 8 January, S.O.H.R. reported eleven Syrian soldiers were killed in heavy clashes between pro- and anti-government troops in Daraa, alongside another 20 wounded in the village of Basr al-Harir. Then nine soldiers were said to have defected to join the opposition. On the same day, heavy machinegun exchanges were heard in the town of Dael in Deraa.

On 20 January, fighting continued and the "Chief Warrant Officer" of Daraa province was allegedly killed after having been abducted by the opposition.

On 26 January, an army lieutenant was killed in Deraa, and 14-year-old boy was shot dead by security forces.

On 27 January, six security force members were killed and five wounded in the province of Daraa by deserters who ambushed two buses transporting security personnel.

On 31 January, rebel soldiers attacked a minibus carrying six security officers on their way to make arrests in Hirak, near Daraa, killing all of the passengers.

On 1 February, SANA reported that, further south in the suburbs of Deraa, security forces killed 11 gunmen and wounded two when they attacked a military bus, killing one army sergeant and wounding two others.

On 2 February, in Daraa city, SANA reported that in a suburb of Daraa, three soldiers including an officer were killed and five injured.

On 3 February, SOHR reported that eight soldiers were killed in clashes in the southern Deraa province with fighters of the Free Syrian Army. Another soldier was also killed earlier in the village of Jasem, also in Deraa province.

On 9 February, SOHR reported the deaths of at least seven soldiers and dozens wounded in an ambush by opposition fighters near the town of Deraa. "The security forces were travelling on board two buses when they were ambushed on a bridge by dissident soldiers," Rami Abdulrahman, told AFP.

On 11 and 12 February at least 22 civilians and 8 FSA fighters and were killed, including the town's chant leader, when government heavy weapons shelled a town, called Msaifara, LCC activists reported. They also reported that the military arrested 90 residents, including children, and refused to give dead bodies back to their relatives.

On 14 February, activists reported that security forces heavily shelled the southern town of Taybeh.

17 February, 12 defecting soldiers were executed in Jassem, Daraa, according to opposition sources.

On 24 February, SANA reported that 3 of the government soldiers were killed and 5 injured in al-Sad area in Daraa city.

On 26 February, S.O.H.R reported that 3 members of the security services were killed in the city of Daraa as their vehicle was targeted by FSA troops, while 2 soldiers were shot dead in the village of Dael as they mounted a minaret. At least 1 member of the security services was shot dead and 4 others wounded when their vehicle was attacked in the city of Nawa.

27 February 5 deserters were killed in the Daraa province by the Assad army according to Syrian government media.

On 28 February, S.O.H.R reported that five soldiers were killed in Dael, in Daraa.

Situation in Daraa, mid-March 2012

On 3 March, six soldiers were killed and nine wounded when armored personnel carriers and military buses were attacked near Daraa.

On 6 March, the military launched an assault on the town of Hirak in Daara. S.O.H.R reported that "Large military forces, including tanks and armoured troop carriers, launched an assault on Herak. Explosions and heavy machinegun fire were heard," the Britain-based monitoring group said, citing residents. The Local Coordination Committees, a network of activists on the ground, denounced the heavy shelling of Herak, which it said targeted houses and mosques, as well as a search operation that saw troops burn homes, loot and carry out arrests. FSA members in the city fought back, leaving 5 soldiers dead. S.O.H.R reported that a young girl was shot dead by a government sniper in the town.

On 10 March, it was reported that 5 soldiers died when an armoured personnel carrier was attack in Daraa province.

On 13 March, FSA fighters killed 12 members of Assad's forces in an attack in Deraa, according to the Syrian Observatory for Human Rights.

On 14 March, the Syrian Army stormed Daraa with 150 armored vehicles, despite a much weaker FSA presence in the city than in Homs or in Idlib, activists said. 7 army defectors and 13 civilians were killed in the operation by the army.

On 21 March, SANA reported a number of security officials and civilians were killed in a car bombing in Daraa. "The blast caused big damages in some surrounding buildings" and left behind a two-metre crater, the agency said in English, but without giving any specific casualty toll, whilst the SOHR organization reported 2 soldiers had been killed in Daraa on 20 March.

On 22 March, 1 soldier was killed in the town of Saida, and two others were killed elsewhere in Daraa province.

On 24 March, 1 soldier was killed in Daraa.

On the 4 April 2012, the FSA in Daraa province killed 2 soldiers.

5 soldiers were killed on 5 April in two different attacks.

=== April 2012 – October 2012 ===
On 15 April, SANA, government-controlled state media, reported the deaths of two soldiers on a highway, and that the bodies of two army officers were found in the Daraa countryside.

On 17 April 2012, despite an agreed ceasefire, government forces shelled Bursa al-Harir, a town controlled by the opposition, killing two civilians.

On 18 April 2012, SANA reported a policeman was shot dead in Deeraa.

On 20 April, SANA reported the deaths of ten security force personnel due to a roadside bomb in southern Syria. Another five soldiers were killed in a bomb attack in the village of Karak. State media claimed the bomb in the first explosion was over 100 kg, and that a bus was blown up near the village of Heit in Daraa province. Also, state media reported that a police station was attacked by a group of men with machine guns, causing one security force member's death and that a chief warrant officer was killed in Daraa.

On 23 April, SANA reported that a lieutenant colonel was killed in an ambush in the Daraa countryside.

On 27 April 2012, the state-run news, SANA, reported that 21 soldiers and security forces had died in the space of two days in Daraa city. Firstly, it was alleged that armed men had shot dead 15 members of the security forces on 25 April, and then shot 6 more on 27 April.

On 2 May, an explosion on a highway killed a soldier and a policeman was killed by gunfire in central Daraa according to SANA, government-controlled media. Meanwhile, two chief warrant officers were also reported to have been killed.

On 15 May, S.O.H.R reported heavy clashed between the military and defectors in Daraa, which saw five soldiers and two civilians dead by the end of the day.

On 16 May, state media reported that two security force members were killed by two explosions and gunfire. One of them was an officer.

Situation in Daraa city, mid-August 2012

On 2 June it was reported that 6 soldiers were killed in Deraa.

On 9 June, the Syrian army was reported to kill at least 17 civilians, including women and children during fighting in Deraa, activists said.

On 10 June it was reported that opposition fighters were gaining ground in Daraa.

On 16 June, state media said that three opposition fighters were killed in Daraa countryside when they tried to attack a checkpoint, while the following day two others were killed by the Syrian army which allegedly seized 3 machines guns and 8 explosives devices.

On 28 June, 17 rebels were killed and 13 others arrested, SANA reported. On 3 August, 16 rebels were killed by helicopter fire near Daraa.

On 16 September 2012, Syrian state-run media reported that one police officer was killed and four wounded when they were shot at in Busra al-Harir, a village in Daraa Governorate.

On September 29, Local Coordinating Committees claimed that FSA fighters carried out a successful attack on a government air defense site in the town of al-Ghariya.

On 13 October 2012, the British-based Syrian Observatory for Human Rights said six soldiers and two army deserters were killed in fighting in the southern town of Haara, as well as one civilian.

=== November 2012 ===
On 10 November twin suicide car bomb attacks struck the Syrian Army Officers' Club in Daraa, killing at least 20 soldiers. SANA also reported the attack but did not mention casualties.

=== December 2012 ===
On 17 December Clashes are ongoing between regime and rebel fighters in the Tariq al-Sad neighbourhood of Dera'a, the area is also under bombardment, early reports of 1 regular soldier dead; clashes also took place in the refugee camp. 1 man was killed by a sniper in Ariha. Clashes took place when rebels attacked an army brigade in the al-Lijah area, early reports that 2 defected officers were killed.

On 18 December, rebel forces stormed the base of the Syrian Army's 34th Brigade near Deraa, capturing several tanks.

On 30 December, 6 people were killed by the airforce bombardment on the town of Kafarnbouda, 2 of them were children and a 2 women; the number is likely to rise due to the large number of seriously injured. 1 civilian was killed by the bombardment on the town of Tibat al-Imam.

== See also ==
- Daraa Governorate campaign
