= 2012–2013 escalation of the Syrian civil war =

Part of the Syrian Civil War

- Part of the Syrian civil war
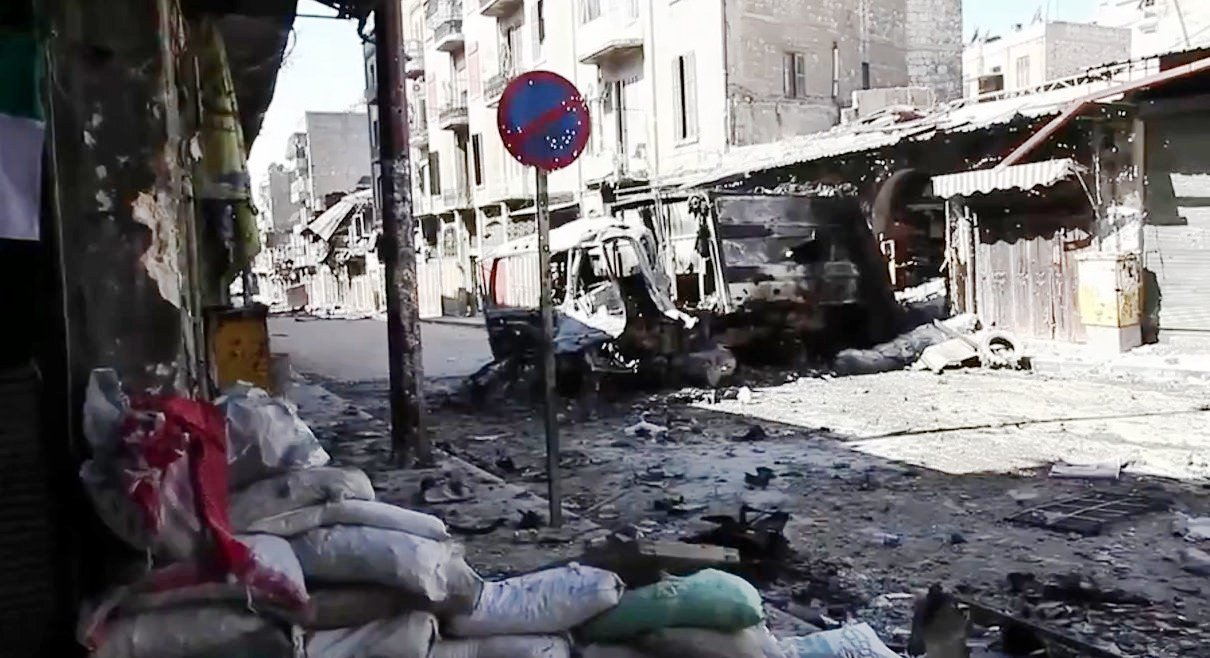
- For a war map of the current situation, see here.
Date	21 April 2012 – 2 January 2014 (1 year, 8 months, 1 week and 5 days)
Location	Syrian territories, with minor spillovers in neighboring countries
Result	Inconclusive

Belligerents
(Ba'athist Syria) Syrian government; Ba'ath Party; Syrian Arab Armed Forces; National Defense Forces; People's Army; Ba'ath Brigades; Syrian Police; Military Intelligence Directorate; Air Force Intelligence Directorate; General Intelligence Directorate; Iran; Iranian Revolutionary Guards; Quds Force; Allied armed groups: Al-Abbas Brigade; Hezbollah; (Palestine) Palestinian Syrian militias; Popular Mobilization Forces; Rojava (DBK & TEV-DEM); People's Protection Units (YPG); Women's Protection Units (YPJ); Syriac Military Council (MFS); Asayish; Sutoro; Allied armed groups: Kurdish Front^{[a]}; Army of Dignity; PKK	Syrian opposition; Al-Nusra Front; (Syrian opposition) Free Syrian Army; (Syrian opposition) Syrian Martyrs' Brigades; (Syrian opposition) Idlib Military Council; Jaysh al-Izza; (Syrian opposition) Knights of Justice Brigade; Islamic Front; Liwa al-Islam; Ahrar al-Sham; Al-Tawhid Brigade; Suqour al-Sham Brigades; Nour al-Din al-Zenki Movement; Other rebel groups; Islamic State of Iraq and the Levant (from 7 April 2013)

Commanders and leaders
Bashar al-Assad (President of Syria); Maher al-Assad (WIA) (4th Division Commander); Dawoud Rajiha † (Defense Minister); Fahd Jassem al-Freij (Chief of the General Staff); Assef Shawkat † (Deputy Defense Minister); Ali Abdullah Ayyoub (Deputy Chief of Staff); Issam Hallaq (Chief of Air Force Staff); Rafiq Shahadah (Military Intelligence head); Jamil Hassan (Air Force Intelligence head); Mohammad al-Shaar (WIA) (Interior Minister); Walid Muallem (Foreign Minister) (Ba'athist Syria) Mohammed Dib Zaitoun (General Intelligence head) (Democratic Autonomous Administration of North and East Syria) Salih Muslim (Democratic Union Party chairman); Sipan Hamo (People's Protection Units commander); Abu Layla (Kurdish Front leader); Humaydi Daham al-Hadi (Army of Dignity leader)	Abu Mohammad al-Julani (WIA) (Al-Nusra Front commander) (Syrian opposition) Riad al-Asaad (WIA) (Free Syrian Army commander) (Syrian opposition) Jamal Maarouf (Syrian Martyrs' Brigade commander) (Syrian opposition) Afif Suleiman (Idlib Military Council commander); Jamil al-Saleh (Jaysh al-Izza commander) (Syrian opposition) Fares Bayoush (Knights of Justice Brigade commander); Zahran Alloush (Liwa al-Islam commander); Hassan Aboud (Ahrar al-Sham commander); Abdul Qader Saleh † (al-Tawhid Brigade commander); Ahmed Issa al-Sheikh (Suqour al-Sham Brigades commander); Sheikh Tawfiq Shahabuddin (Nour al-Din al-Zenki Movement commander) Abu Bakr al-Baghdadi (ISIL commander)

Strength
Syrian Armed Forces: 178,000 (by Aug 2013); General Intelligence Directorate: 8,000; Shabiha: 10,000 fighters National Defense Force: 60,000 soldiers Jaysh al-Sha'bi: 50,000 fighters al-Abbas brigade: 10,000 fighters Hezbollah: 3,000–5,000 fighters Iran: 150–1,500 IRGC; Asa'ib Ahl al-Haq: 1,000 fighters People's Protection Units (YPG): 15,000 – 35,000	Free Syrian Army: 40,000 – 50,000; Islamic Front: 45,000 – 60,000; Al-Nusra Front: 5,000–7,000 Islamic State of Iraq and the Levant: 3,000–5,000

Casualties and losses
Syrian government 15,000–31,174 soldiers and policemen killed 19,256 militiamen killed 1,000 government officials killed 5,000 soldiers and militiamen captured Hezbollah; 232–250 killed Other non-Syrian Shiite fighters 265 killed Iranian IRGC; 16 killed Rojava; 265+ fighters killed	27,746–50,930 fighters killed^{[c]} 979 protesters killed 16,000–46,601 opposition fighters and supporters captured
- 120,000 killed overall (September 2013 French estimate) 91,875–125,835 deaths documented by opposition groups December 2013**; 165,835 killed overall (December 2013 SOHR estimate)^{[d]} 760–1,806 foreign civilians killed (Iraq) 16 Iraqi soldiers killed (Lebanon) 5 Lebanese soldiers killed (Turkey) 3 Turkish servicemen killed (Jordan) 1 Jordanian soldier killed 4.5 million (UN, Sep 2013) – 5.1 million (iDMC, Sep 2013) internally displaced 3,000,000 refugees (by November 2013) 130,000 missing or detained Notes: The Kurdish Front was part of the FSA, but opposes ISIL & al-Nusra.; The al-Nusra Front and ISIL cooperated with various other rebel groups during this time, while fighting other groups.; Number of rebel fighters possibly higher due to the opposition counting rebels that were not defectors as civilians.; Number of fatalities includes foreign fighters from both sides, as well as foreign civilians

The 2012–2013 escalation of the Syrian civil war refers to the third phase of the Syrian civil war, which gradually escalated from a UN-mediated cease fire attempt during April–May 2012 and deteriorated into radical violence, escalating the conflict level to a full-fledged civil war.

Following the Houla massacre of 25 May 2012, in which 108 people were summarily executed, and the subsequent Free Syrian Army (FSA) ultimatum to the Syrian Ba'athist government, the ceasefire practically collapsed as the FSA began nationwide offensives against government troops. On 1 June 2012, President Bashar al-Assad vowed to crush the anti-government uprising. On 12 June 2012, the UN for the first time officially proclaimed Syria to be in a state of civil war. The conflict began moving into the two largest cities, Aleppo and the capital Damascus.

Following the failure of another ceasefire in October 2012, during the winter of 2012–2013 and early spring of 2013 the rebels continued advances on all fronts. In mid-December 2012, American officials said that the Syrian military began firing Scud ballistic missiles at rebel positions in Syria. On 11 January 2013, Islamist groups, including the al-Qaeda-linked al-Nusra Front, took full control of the Taftanaz air base in the Idlib Governorate, after weeks of fighting. In mid-January 2013, as clashes re-erupted between rebels and Kurdish forces in Ras al-Ayn, YPG forces moved to expel government forces from oil-rich areas in the Hasakah Governorate. By 6 March 2013, the rebels had captured the city of Raqqa, making it the first provincial capital to be lost by the Assad government. In early April 2013, the powerful jihadist insurgent group, the Islamic State of Iraq, expanded from Iraq into Syria and adopted the new name ad-Dawlah al-Islāmiyah fī 'l-ʿIrāq wa-sh-Shām (الدولة الإسلامية في العراق والشام), variously translated as "Islamic State of Iraq and al-Sham", "Islamic State of Iraq and Syria" (both abbreviated as ISIS), or "Islamic State of Iraq and the Levant" (abbreviated as ISIL).

The rebel advances were finally stopped in April 2013, as the Syrian Arab Army reorganized and then initiated offensives. On 17 April 2013, government forces breached a six-month rebel blockade on the Wadi Deif base near Idlib. Heavy fighting was reported around the town of Babuleen after government troops attempt to secure control of a main highway leading to Aleppo. The break in the siege also allowed government forces to resupply two major military bases in the region which had been relying on sporadic airdrops. In April 2013, government and Hezbollah forces, who have increasingly become involved in the fighting, launched an offensive to capture areas near al-Qusayr. On 21 April, pro-Assad forces captured the towns of Burhaniya, Saqraja and al-Radwaniya near the Lebanon–Syria border.

From July 2013, the situation became a stalemate, with fighting continuing on all fronts between various factions with numerous casualties, but without major territorial changes. On 28 June 2013, rebel forces captured a major military checkpoint in the southern city of Daraa. Shortly after, some Syrian rebel groups declared war on the Islamic State of Iraq and the Levant which was becoming increasingly dominant. A major advance took place on 6 August 2013, as rebels and ISIL captured Menagh Military Airbase after a 10-month siege. On 21 August a chemical attack took place in the Ghouta region of the Damascus countryside, leading to thousands of casualties and several hundred dead in the opposition-held stronghold. The attack was followed by a military offensive by government forces into the area. The attack, largely attributed to Assad forces, caused the international community to seek the chemical disarmament of the Syrian Army.

Late 2013 was marked by increased initiative on the part of the Syrian Army, which led offensives against opposition groups on several fronts. The Syrian Army along with its allies, Hezbollah and al-Abbas Brigade, launched an offensive on Damascus and Aleppo in November. Fighting between Kurdish forces, rebels and al-Nusra front continued in other locations.

== Background ==
On 23 February 2012, the evening before an international "Friends of Syria" conference organised by the Arab League in Tunisia, The United Nations and the Arab League together appointed Kofi Annan as their envoy to Syria. 70 nations were present on the conference, Russia and China not among them; Syria called those nations attending "historic enemies of the Arabs". On 16 March, Kofi Annan submitted a six-point peace plan to the UN Security Council (see below), basically asking the Syrian government "to address the legitimate aspirations and concerns of the Syrian people", stop fighting, pullback military concentrations from towns, while simultaneously the Envoy would seek similar commitments from the Syrian opposition and other “elements”.

On 5 April 2012, Annan told the UN General Assembly that the cease-fire deadline for the Syrian government would be 6 am local time on Tuesday 10 April, and for the rebels 6 am local time on 12 April. On 12 April 2012, both sides, the Syrian Ba'athist government and rebels of the FSA and some other factions, entered a UN-mediated ceasefire period.

== Timeline ==
=== Ceasefire attempt (April–May 2012) ===
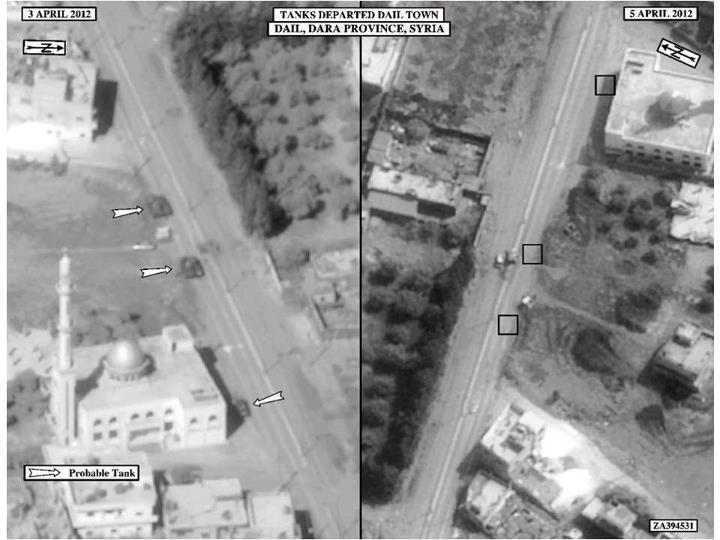
Syrian Army tanks during the clashes in Daraa Governorate in April 2012.

On 14 April 2012, the UN Security Council meeting adopting Resolution 2042 stated that the Envoy assessed that “as of 12 April, the parties appeared to be observing a cessation of fire”.

The UN-mediated cease fire attempt had eventually turned into a failure, with infractions of the ceasefire by both sides resulting in several dozen casualties. In a bombing in Idlib on 30 April, several dozen people were killed and many more wounded in two car bomb attacks targeting Syrian military facilities in the city, not far from where some of the UN observers in the city had been staying. By the beginning of May, over 500 people had been killed in hostilities all across Syria since the ceasefire was declared on 12 April. Acknowledging the failure of the ceasefire, Kofi Annan called for Iran to be "part of the solution", though the country has been excluded from the Friends of Syria initiative.

Following the Houla massacre of 25 May 2012, in which 108 people were summarily executed, and the subsequent FSA ultimatum to the Syrian Ba'athist government, the ceasefire entirely collapsed, as the FSA began nationwide offensives against government troops. The peace plan practically collapsed by early June and the UN mission was withdrawn from Syria. Annan resigned in frustration on 2 August 2012.

=== Renewed fighting (June–October 2012) ===
==== June ====
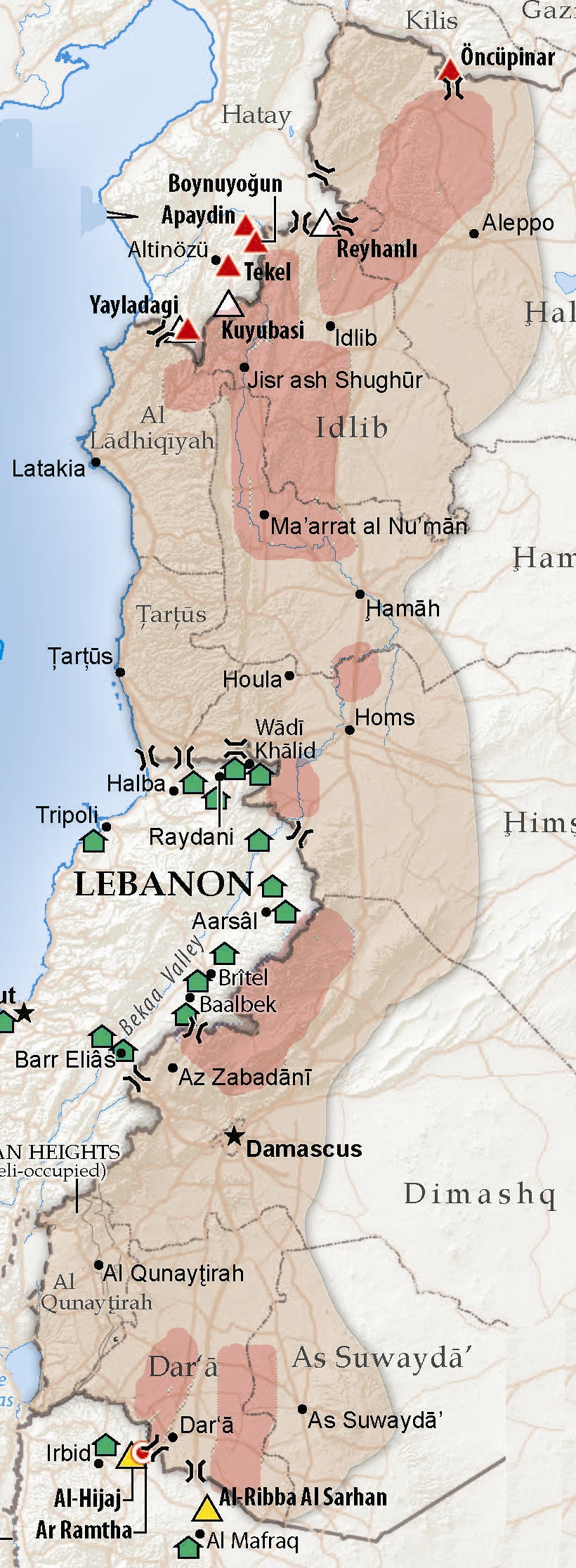
Areas in western Syria under control of the Free Syrian Army and other rebel groups in June 2012 (dark red).

On 1 June 2012, President Assad vowed to crush the anti-government uprising. On 5 June 2012, fighting broke out in Haffa and nearby villages in the coastal governorate of Latakia Governorate. Government forces were backed by helicopter gunships in the heaviest clashes in the governorate since the revolt began. Syrian forces seized the territory following days of fighting and shelling. On 6 June 78 civilians were killed in the Al-Qubeir massacre. According to activist sources, government forces started by shelling the village before the Shabiha militia moved in. UN observers headed to Al-Qubeir in the hope of investigating the massacre, but they were met with a roadblock and small arms fire and were forced to retreat.

On 12 June 2012, the UN for the first time officially proclaimed Syria to be in a state of civil war. The conflict began moving into the two largest cities, Damascus and Aleppo. In both cities, peaceful protests – including a general strike by Damascus shopkeepers and a small strike in Aleppo were interpreted as indicating that the historical alliance between the government and the business establishment in the large cities had become weak. On 22 June, a Turkish F-4 fighter jet was shot down by Syrian government forces, killing both pilots. Syria and Turkey disputed whether the jet had been flying in Syrian or international airspace when it was shot down. Bashar al-Assad publicly apologised for the incident.

==== July ====
By 10 July 2012, rebel forces had captured most of the city of Al-Qusayr, in Homs Governorate, after weeks of fighting. By mid-July, rebels had captured the town of Saraqib, in Idlib Governorate. By 15 July 2012, with fighting spread across the country and 16,000 people killed, the International Committee of the Red Cross declared the conflict a civil war. Fighting in Damascus intensified, with a major rebel push to take the city. On 18 July, Syrian Defense Minister Dawoud Rajiha, former defense minister Hasan Turkmani, and the president's brother-in-law General Assef Shawkat were killed by a suicide bomb attack in Damascus. The Syrian intelligence chief Hisham Ikhtiyar, who was injured in the same explosion, later succumbed to his wounds. Both the FSA and Liwa al-Islam claimed responsibility for the assassination.

Situation in Syria, mid-August 2012

In mid-July, rebel forces attacked Damascus and were repelled over two weeks, although fighting still continued in the outskirts. After this, the focus shifted to the battle for control of Aleppo. On 25 July, multiple sources reported that the Assad government was using fighter jets to attack rebel positions in Aleppo and Damascus, and on 1 August, UN observers in Syria witnessed government fighter jets firing on rebels in Aleppo. In early August, the Syrian Army recaptured Salaheddin district, an important rebel stronghold in Aleppo. In August, the government began using fixed-wing warplanes against the rebels. On 19 July, Iraqi officials reported that the FSA had gained control of all four border checkpoints between Syria and Iraq, increasing concerns for the safety of Iraqis trying to escape the violence in Syria.

==== September ====
On 6 September 2012 Kurdish activists reported that 21 civilians were killed in the Kurdish neighborhood of Sheikh Maqsud in the city of Aleppo, when the Syrian Army shelled the local mosque and its surroundings. Despite the district being neutral during the Battle of Aleppo and free of clashes between government and FSA forces, local residents believed that the district was shelled as retaliation for sheltering anti-government civilians from other parts of the city. In a statement released shortly after the deaths, the Kurdish People's Protection Units (YPG) vowed to retaliate. A few days later, Kurdish forces killed 3 soldiers in Afrin (Kurdish: Efrîn) and captured a number of other government soldiers in Ayn al-Arab (Kurdish: Kobanî) and Al-Malikiyah (Kurdish: Dêrika Hemko) from where they drove the remaining government security forces. It was also reported that the government had begun to arm Arab tribes around Qamishli in preparation for a possible confrontation with Kurdish forces, who still did not completely control the city.

On 19 September 2012, rebel forces seized a border crossing between Syria and Turkey in Raqqa Governorate. It was speculated that this crossing could provide opposition forces with strategic and logistical advantages due to Turkish support for the Syrian opposition, whose headquarters subsequently relocated from southern Turkey into northern Syria. At least 8 government soldiers were killed and 15 wounded by a car bomb in the al-Gharibi district of Qamishli on 30 September 2012. The explosion targeted the Political Security branch.

==== October ====
In October 2012, rebel forces seized control of Maarat al-Numan, a town in Idlib Governorate on the highway linking Damascus with Aleppo and captured Douma, marking increased influence in Rif Dimashq. Lakhdar Brahimi arranged for a ceasefire during Eid al-Adha in late October 2012, but it quickly collapsed.

=== Rebel offensives (November 2012 – April 2013) ===
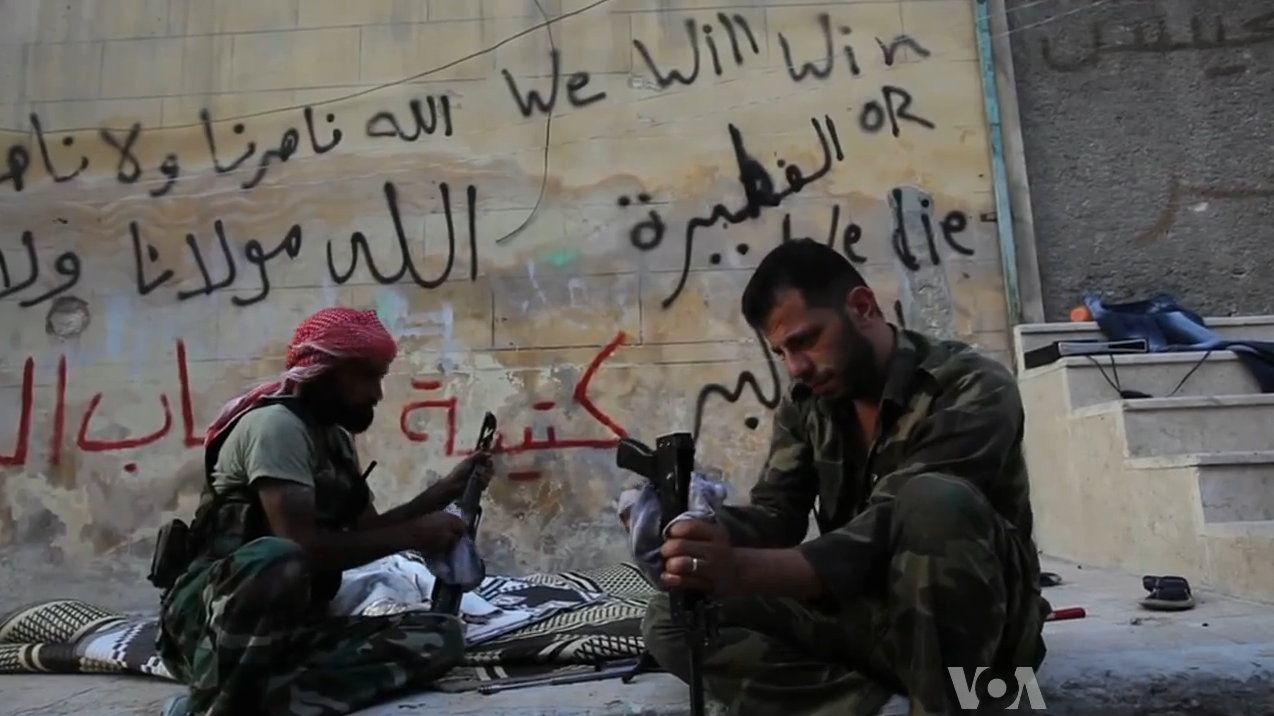
Free Syrian Army fighters clean their weapons during the Battle of Aleppo.

After Brahimi's ceasefire agreement ended on 30 October 2012, the Syrian military expanded its bombing campaign in Damascus. The district of Jobar suffered the first bomb hit from a fighter jet in Damascus. The following day, Syrian Air Force commander Gen. Abdullah Mahmud al-Khalidi was assassinated by opposition gunmen in the Damascus district of Rukn al-Din. In early November 2012, rebels made significant gains in northern Syria. The rebel capture of Saraqib in Idlib Governorate, which lies on the M5 highway, further isolated Aleppo. Due to insufficient anti-aircraft weapons, rebel units attempted to nullify the government's air power by destroying landed helicopters and aircraft on air bases. On 3 November, rebels launched an attack on the Taftanaz air base.

On 18 November 2012, rebels took control of Base 46 in the Aleppo Governorate, one of the Syrian Army's largest bases in northern Syria, after weeks of intense fighting. Defected General Mohammed Ahmed al-Faj, who commanded the assault, stated nearly 300 Syrian troops had been killed and 60 had been captured, with rebels seizing large amounts of heavy weapons, including tanks. On 22 November, rebels captured the Mayadin military base in the country's eastern Deir ez-Zor Governorate. This gave the rebels control of much territory east of the base, stretching to the Iraqi border. On 29 November, at approximately 10:26 UTC, the Syrian internet and phone service was shut off for two days. Syrian officials blamed the blackout on terrorists having cut "a main fiber optic cable connecting Damascus to the rest of the world"; Edward Snowden in August 2014 claimed that this internet breakdown had been caused, though unintendedly, by hackers of the NSA during an operation to intercept internet communications in Syria.

In mid-December 2012, American officials said that the Syrian military had fired Scud ballistic missiles at rebel fighters inside Syria. Reportedly, six Scud missiles were fired at the Sheikh Suleiman base north of Aleppo, occupied by rebel forces. It is unclear whether the Scuds hit the intended target. The government denied this claim. Later that month, a further Scud attack took place near Marea, a town north of Aleppo near the Turkish border, apparently missing its target, and the FSA penetrated into Latakia Governorate's coast through Turkey. In late December, rebel forces pushed further into Damascus, taking control of the adjoining Yarmouk and Palestine refugee camps, pushing out pro-government Popular Front for the Liberation of Palestine-General Command fighters with the help of other factions. Rebel forces launched an offensive in Hama Governorate, claiming to have forced army regulars to evacuate several towns and bases, and stating that "three-quarters of western rural Hama is under our control." Rebels also captured the town of Harem near the Turkish border in Idlib Governorate, after weeks of heavy fighting.

Situation in Syria, mid-March 2013

On 11 January 2013, Islamist groups, including al-Nusra Front, took full control of the Taftanaz air base in the Idlib Governorate, after weeks of fighting. The base had been used by the Syrian military to carry out helicopter raids and deliver supplies. The rebels claimed to have seized helicopters, tanks and rocket launchers, before being forced to withdraw by a government counter-attack. The leader of the al-Nusra Front said the amount of weapons they took was a "game changer". On 11 February, Islamist rebels captured the town of Al-Thawrah in Raqqa Governorate and the nearby Tabqa Dam, Syria's largest dam and a key source of hydroelectricity. The next day, rebel forces took control of Jarrah air base, located 60 kilometres (37 mi) east of Aleppo. On 14 February, al-Nusra Front fighters took control of Shadadeh, a town in Al-Hasakah Governorate near the Iraqi border.

On 20 February 2013, a car bomb exploded in Damascus near the Ba'ath Syrian Regional Branch headquarters, killing at least 53 people and injuring more than 235. No group claimed responsibility. On 21 February, the FSA in Quasar began shelling Hezbollah positions in Lebanon. Prior to this, Hezbollah had been shelling villages near Quasar from within Lebanon. A 48-hour ultimatum was issued by a FSA commander on 20 February, warning the militant group to stop the attacks.

On 2 March 2013, intense clashes between rebels and the Syrian Army erupted in the city of Raqqa, with many deaths reported on both sides. On the same day, Syrian troops regained several villages near Aleppo. By 3 March, rebels had overrun Raqqa's central prison and freed hundreds of prisoners, according to the SOHR. The SOHR also stated that rebel fighters had taken control of most of an Aleppo police academy in Khan al-Asal, and that over 200 rebels and government troops had been killed fighting for control of it.

By 6 March 2013, the rebels had captured the city of Raqqa, effectively making it the first provincial capital to be lost by the Assad government. Residents of Raqqa toppled a bronze statue of his late father Hafez al-Assad in the centre of the city. The rebels also seized two top government officials. On 18 March, the Syrian Air Force attacked rebel positions in Lebanon for the first time, at the Wadi al-Khayl Valley area, near the town of Arsal. On 21 March, a suspected suicide bombing in the Iman Mosque in Mazraa district killed as many as 41 people, including the pro-Assad Sunni cleric, Sheikh Mohammed al-Buti. On 23 March, several rebel groups seized the 38th division air defense base in southern Daraa Governorate near a highway linking Damascus to Jordan. On the next day, rebels captured a 25-kilometre (16-mile) strip of land near the Jordanian border, which included the towns of Muzrib, Abdin, and the al-Rai military checkpoint. On 25 March, rebels launched one of their heaviest bombardments of Central Damascus since the revolt began. Mortars reached Umayyad Square, where the Ba'ath Party headquarters, Air Force Intelligence and state television are located.

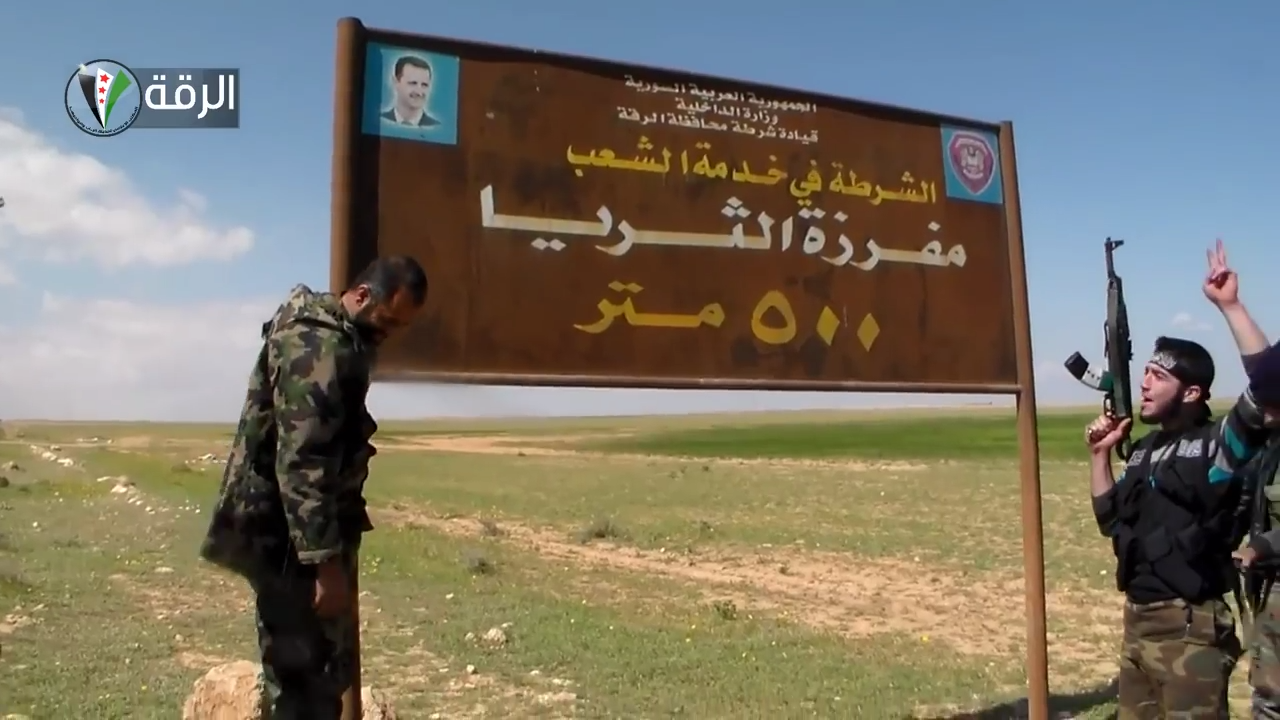
Fighters of the al-Tawhid Brigade deface an image of President Bashar al-Assad on the road between Hama and Raqqa on 27 March 2013.

On 26 March 2013, near the Syrian town of al-Qusayr, rebel commander Khaled al Hamad, who commanded the Al Farooq al-Mustakilla Brigade and is also known by his nom de guerre Abu Sakkar, ate the heart and liver of a dead soldier and said "I swear to God, you soldiers of Bashar, you dogs, we will eat from your hearts and livers! O heroes of Bab Amr, you slaughter the Alawites and take out their hearts to eat them!" in an apparent attempt to increase sectarianism. Video of the event emerged two months later and resulted in considerable outrage, especially from Human Rights Watch which classified the incident as a war crime. According to the BBC, it was one of the most gruesome videos to emerge from the conflict to-date. On 29 March, rebels captured the town of Da'el after fierce fighting. The town is located in Daraa Governorate, along the highway connecting Damascus to Jordan. On 3 April, rebels captured a military base near the city of Daraa.

In mid-January 2013, as clashes re-erupted between rebels and Kurdish forces in Ras al-Ayn, YPG forces moved to expel government forces from oil-rich areas in Hassakeh Province. Clashes broke out from 14 to 19 January between the army and YPG fighters in the Kurdish village of Gir Zîro (Tall Adas), near al-Maabadah (Kurdish: Girkê Legê), where an army battalion of around 200 soldiers had been blockaded since 9 January. YPG forces claimed to have expelled government after the clashes. One soldier was reportedly killed and another eight injured, while seven were captured (later released) and 27 defected. Fighting at the oil field near Gir Zîro ended on 21 January, when government forces withdrew after receiving no assistance from Damascus. In Rumeilan, directly west of al-Maabadah, another 200 soldiers had been surrounded by YPG forces, and 10 soldiers were reported to have defected.

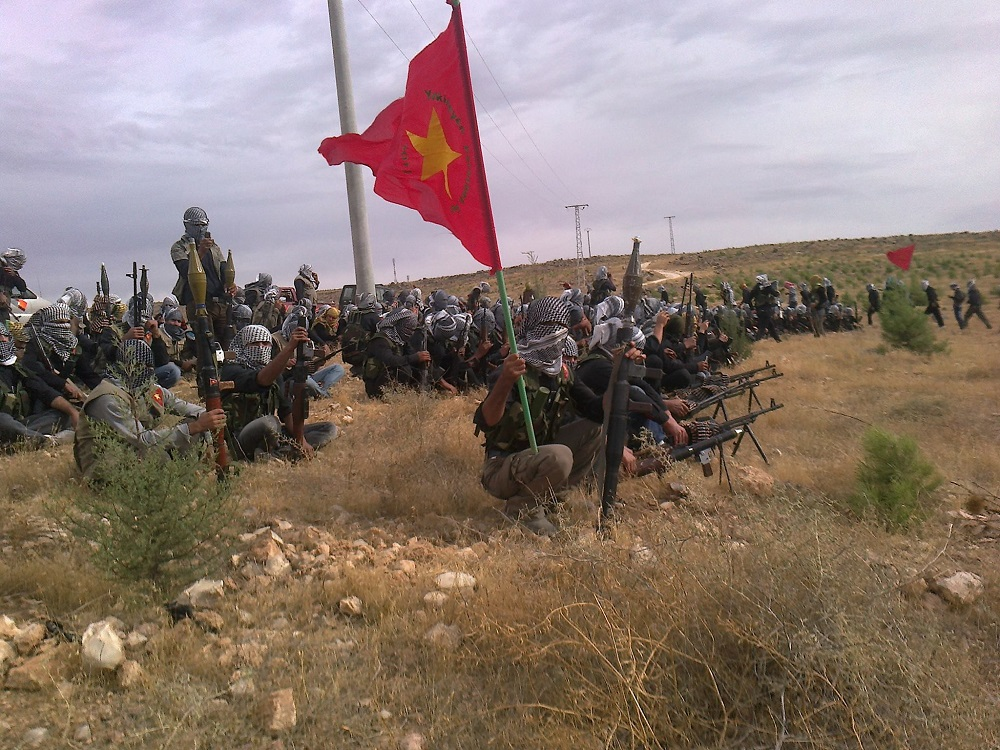
YPG fighters in 2013

From 8 to 11 February 2013, heavy clashes broke out between the YPG and government troops in the PYD/YPG-held district Ashrafiyah where, according to SOHR, at least 3 soldiers and 5 pro-government militiamen were killed. The fighting followed deadly shelling on 31 January on Ashrafiyah, in which 23 civilians were killed after FSA units moved into the Kurdish sector of Aleppo. According to its own reports, the YPG lost 7 of its members in the fighting, while also claiming that 48 soldiers were killed and 22 captured, and a further 70 injured. In early March, YPG forces established full control of oil fields and installations in north-east Syria after government forces posted there surrendered. Also, YPG assaulted government forces and took control of the towns of Tall ʿAdas, which is adjacent to Rumeilan oil fields, and Al-Qahtaniya (Kurdish: Tirbespî).

In April 2013, the powerful jihadist insurgent group, the Islamic State of Iraq, expanded from Iraq into Syria and adopted the name ad-Dawlah al-Islāmiyah fī 'l-ʿIrāq wa-sh-Shām (الدولة الإسلامية في العراق والشام). As al-Shām is a region often compared with the Levant or the region of Syria, the group's name has been variously translated as "Islamic State of Iraq and al-Sham", "Islamic State of Iraq and Syria" (both abbreviated as ISIS), or "Islamic State of Iraq and the Levant" (abbreviated as ISIL).

=== Government offensives (April–June 2013) ===
On 17 April 2013, Ba'athist government forces breached a six-month rebel blockade in Wadi al-Deif, near Idlib. Heavy fighting was reported around the town of Babuleen after government troops attempt to secure control of a main highway leading to Aleppo. The break in the siege also allowed government forces to resupply two major military bases in the region which had been relying on sporadic airdrops. On 18 April, the FSA took control of Al-Dab'a Air Base near the city of al-Qusayr. The base was being used primarily to garrison ground troops. Meanwhile, the Syrian Army re-captured the town of Abel. The SOHR said the loss of the town would hamper rebel movements between al-Qusayr and Homs city. The capture of the airport would have relieved the pressure on the rebels in the area, but their loss of Abel made the situation more complicated. The same day, rebels reportedly assassinated Ali Ballan, who was a government employee, in the Mazzeh district of Damascus. On 21 April, government forces captured the town of Jdaidet al-Fadl, near Damascus.

The Syrian government and allied Hezbollah forces won a major strategic victory during the Al-Qusayr offensive.

In April 2013, government and Hezbollah forces launched an offensive to capture areas near al-Qusayr. On 21 April, pro-Assad forces captured the towns of Burhaniya, Saqraja and al-Radwaniya near the Lebanese border. By this point, eight villages had fallen to the government offensive in the area. On 24 April, after five weeks of fighting, government troops re-took control of the town of Otaiba, east of Damascus, which had been serving as the main arms supply route from Jordan. Meanwhile, in the north of the country, rebels took control of a position on the edge of the strategic Mennagh Military airbase, on the outskirts of Aleppo. This allowed them to enter the airbase after months of besieging it.

On 2 May 2013, government forces captured the town of Qaysa in a push north from the city's airport. Troops also retook the Wadi al-Sayeh central district of Homs, driving a wedge between two rebel strongholds. SOHR reported a massacre of over 100 people by the Syrian Army in the coastal town of Al Bayda, Baniyas. However, this could not be independently verified due to movement restrictions on the ground. Yet the multiple video images that residents said they had recorded – particularly of small children, were so shocking that even some government supporters rejected Syrian television's official version of events, that the army had simply "crushed a number of terrorists." On 15 June, the Syrian Army captured the Damascus suburb of Ahmadiyeh near the city's airport. On 22 June, the Syrian Army captured the rebel stronghold town of Talkalakh.

=== Continued fighting (July–October 2013) ===
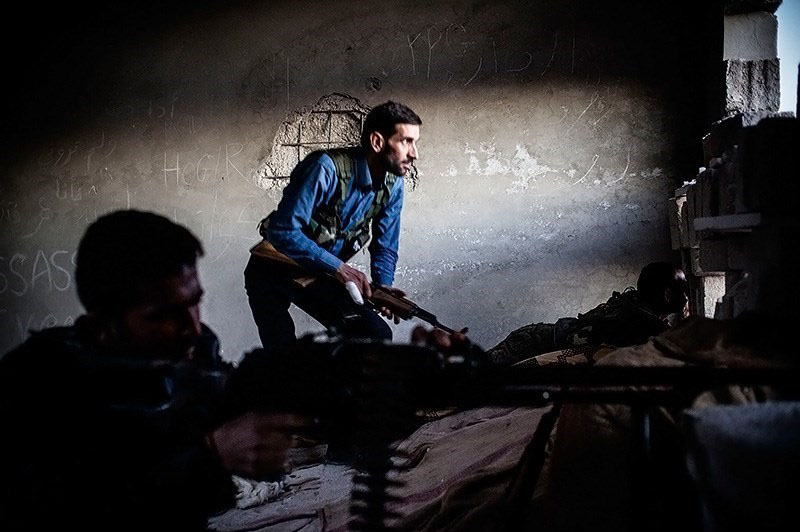
YPG fighters battle mujahideen and the Free Syrian Army at Ras al-Ayn.

On 28 June 2013, rebel forces captured a major military checkpoint in the city of Daraa. On 12 July FSA reported that one of its commanders, Kamal Hamami, had been killed by Islamists a day before. The rebels declared that the assassination by the Islamic State of Iraq and Levant, was tantamount to a declaration of war. On 17 July, FSA forces took control of most of the southern city of Nawa after seizing up to 40 army posts stationed in the city. On 18 July, Kurdish YPG forces secured control of the northern town of Ras al-Ayn, after days of fighting with the al-Nusra Front. In the following three months, continued fighting between Kurdish and mainly jihadist rebel forces led to the capture of two dozen towns and villages in Hasakah Governorate by Kurdish fighters, while the Jihadists made limited gains in Aleppo and Raqqa governorates after they turned on the Kurdish rebel group Jabhat al-Akrad over its relationship with the YPG. In Aleppo Governorate, Islamists massacred the Kurds leading to a mass migration of civilians to the town of Afrin.

On 22 July 2013, FSA fighters seized control of the western Aleppo suburb of Khan al-Asal. The town was the last government stronghold in the western portion of Aleppo Governorate. On 25 July, the Syrian Army secured the town of al-Sukhnah, after expelling the al-Nusra Front. On 27 July, after weeks of fighting and bombardment in Homs, the Syrian Army captured the historic Khalid ibn al-Walid Mosque, and two days later, captured the district of Khaldiyeh. On 4 August, around 10 rebel brigades, launched a large-scale offensive on the government stronghold of Latakia Governorate. Initial attacks by 2,000 opposition members seized as many as 12 villages in the mountainous area. Between 4 and 5 August 20 rebels and 32 government soldiers and militiamen had been killed in the clashes. Hundreds of Alawite villagers fled to Latakia. By 5 August, rebel fighters advanced to a position 20 kilometres (12 miles) from Qardaha, the home town of the Assad family. However, in mid-August, the military counter-attacked and recaptured all of the territory previously lost to the rebels in the coastal region during the offensive. A Syrian security force source "told AFP the army still had to recapture the Salma region, a strategic area along the border with Turkey." According to a Human Rights Watch report 190 civilians were killed by rebel forces during the offensive, including at least 67 being executed. Another 200 civilians, primarily women and children, were taken hostage.

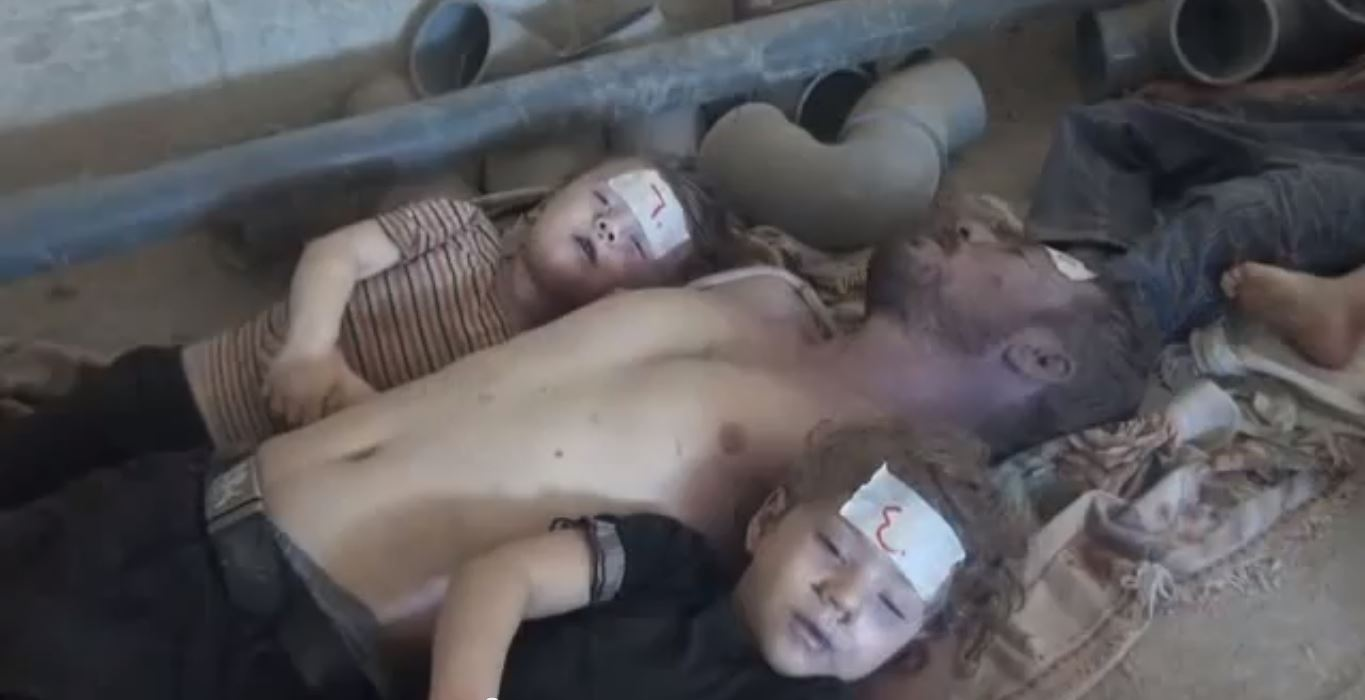
Victims of the Ghouta chemical attack, which killed hundreds and wounded over three thousand.

On 6 August 2013, rebels captured Menagh Military Airbase after a 10-month siege. The strategic airbase is located on the road between Aleppo city and the Turkish border. On 21 August a chemical attack took place in the Ghouta region of the Damascus countryside, leading to thousands of casualties and several hundred dead in the opposition-held stronghold. The attack was followed by a military offensive by government forces into the area, which had been hotbeds of the opposition. On 24 August, rebels captured the town of Ariha. However, government forces recaptured Ariha on 3 September. On 26 August, rebel forces took over the town of Khanasir in Aleppo Governorate which was the government's last supply route for Aleppo.

On 8 September 2013, rebels led by the al-Nusra Front captured the Christian town of Maaloula, 43 kilometres (27 miles) north of Damascus, The Syrian Army launched a counterattack a few days later, recapturing the town. On 18 September, the Islamic State of Iraq and the Levant (ISIS) overran the FSA-held town of Azaz in the north. The fighting was the most severe since tensions rose between militant factions in Syria earlier in the year. Soon after ISIS captured Azaz, a ceasefire was announced between the rival rebel groups. However, in early October, more fighting erupted in the town.

On 20 September 2013, Alawite militias including the NDF killed 15 civilians in the Sunni village of Sheik Hadid in Hama Governorate. The massacre occurred in retaliation for a rebel capture of the village of Jalma, in Hama, which killed five soldiers, along with the seizure of a military checkpoint which killed 16 soldiers and 10 NDF militiamen. In mid-September, the military captured the towns of Deir Salman and Shebaa on the outskirts of Damascus. The Army also captured six villages in eastern Homs. Fighting broke out in those towns again in October. On 28 September, rebels seized the Ramtha border post in Daraa Governorate on the Syria Jordan crossing after fighting which left 26 soldiers dead along with 7 foreign rebel fighters. On 3 October, AFP reported that Syria's army had managed to re-take the town of Khanasir, which is located on a supply route linking central Syria to the city of Aleppo. On 7 October, the Syrian Army managed to reopen the supply route between Aleppo and Khanasir.

On 9 October 2013, rebels seized the Hajanar guard post on the Jordanian border after a month of fierce fighting. Rebels were now in control of a swath of territory along the border from outside of Daraa to the edge of Golan Heights. The same day, Hezbollah and Iraqi Shiite fighters, backed up by artillery, air-strikes and tanks, captured the town of Sheikh Omar, on the southern outskirts of Damascus. Two days later, they also captured the towns of al-Thiabiya and Husseiniya on the southern approaches to Damascus. The capture of the three towns strengthened the government hold on major supply lines and put more pressure on rebels under siege in the Eastern Ghouta area. On 14 October, SOHR reported that rebels captured the Resefa and Sinaa districts of Deir ez-Zor, as well as the city's military hospital.

=== Government offensives (October–December 2013) ===
In a large-scale offensive in late 2013, Syrian government forces made major advances in Aleppo.

The Syrian Arab Army along with its allies, Hezbollah and the al-Abbas brigade, launched an offensive on Damascus and Aleppo. On 16 October, AFP reported that Syrian troops recaptured the town of Bweida, south of Damascus. On 17 October, the Syrian government's head of Military Intelligence in Deir ez-Zor Governorate, Jameh Jameh, was assassinated by rebels in Deir ez-Zor city. SOHR reported that he had been shot by a rebel sniper during a battle with rebel brigades. On 24 October, the Syrian Army managed to retake control of the town of Hatetat al-Turkman, located southeast of Damascus, along the Damascus International Airport road.

On 26 October 2013, Kurdish rebel fighters seized control of the strategic Yarubiya border crossing between Syria and Iraq from al-Nusra in Al Hasakah Governorate. Elsewhere, in Daraa Governorate, rebel fighters captured the town of Tafas from government forces after weeks of clashes which left scores dead. On 1 November, the Syrian Army retook control of the key city of Al-Safira and the next day, the Syrian Army and its allies recaptured the village of Aziziyeh on the northern outskirts of Al-Safira. From early to mid-November, Syrian Army forces captured several towns south of Damascus, including Hejeira and Sbeineh. Government forces also recaptured the town of Tel Aran, southeast of Aleppo, and a military base near Aleppo's international airport.

On 10 November 2013, the Syrian Army had taken full control of "Base 80", near Aleppo's airport. According to the SOHR, 63 rebels, and 32 soldiers were killed during the battle. One other report put the number of rebels killed between 60 and 80. Army units were backed-up by Hezbollah fighters and pro-government militias during the assault. The following day, government forces secured most of the area around the airport. On 13 November, government forces captured most of Hejeira. Rebels retreated from Hejeira to Al-Hajar al-Aswad. However, their defenses in besieged districts closer to the heart of Damascus were still solid.

On 15 November 2013, the Syrian Army retook control of the city of Tell Hassel near Aleppo. On 18 November, the Syrian troops stormed the town of Babbila. On 19 November, government forces took full control of Qara. The same day, the Syrian Army captured al-Duwayrinah. On 23 November, al-Nusra Front and other Islamist rebels captured the al-Omar oil field, Syria's largest oil field, in Deir al-Zor Governorate causing the government to rely almost entirely on imported oil. On 24 November, rebels captured the towns of Bahariya, Qasimiya, Abbadah, and Deir Salman in Damascus's countryside. On 28 November, the Syrian Army recaptured Deir Attiyeh.

On 2 December 2013, rebels led by the Free Syrian Army recaptured the historic Christian town of Ma'loula. After the fighting, reports emerged that 12 nuns had been abducted by the rebels. However, the FSA disputes this and said that the nuns had been evacuated to the nearby rebel held town of Yabrud due to the Army shelling. In early December, the Islamic Front seized control of Bab al-Hawa border crossing with Turkey, which had been in hands of FSA. The groups also captured warehouses containing equipment delivered by the U.S. In response, the U.S. and Britain said they halted all non-lethal aid to the FSA, fearing that further supplies could fall in hands of al-Qaeda militants. On 9 December, the Free Syrian Army took full control of Nabek, with fighting continuing in its outskirts.

== See also ==
- Timeline of the Syrian Civil War
