= Battle of Damascus (2012) =

During the Syrian civil war

Battle of Damascus (2012) معركة دمشق
- Part of the Syrian civil war (Rif Dimashq Governorate campaign)
- Situation in the city during the battle of Damascus. Pink indicates a conflict area.
Date	15 July – 4 August 2012 (2 weeks and 6 days)
Location	Damascus, Syria 33°30′44″N 36°17′54″E
Result	Syrian government victory (Note: Sources:): Rebel offensive on Damascus repelled by government forces; President Bashar al-Assad and his government remain in power; Four senior government officials killed in a bombing attack; Sporadic insurgent attacks continue leading to a military offensive into the countryside in mid-August

Belligerents
(Syria) Syrian Government	Syrian Opposition; Al-Nusra Front; Free Syrian Army; Ahrar al-Sham

Commanders and leaders
(Syria) Bashar al-Assad (Syria) Dawoud Rajiha X (Syria) Assef Shawkat X (Syria) Fahd Jassem al-Freij (Syria) Ali Abdullah Ayyoub (Syria) Maher al-Assad (WIA) (Syria) Mohammad al-Shaar (WIA)	Abu Mohammad al-Julani; Riad al-Asaad; Khaled al-Haboush; Qasem Saadedine; Zahran Alloush; Hassan Aboud

Units involved
Syrian Armed Forces; Syrian Army; Syrian Army Command; Republican Guard; 3rd Armoured Division; 4th Armoured Division; 7th Mechanized Division; Elements of other divisions; Syrian Air Force; Ministry of Interior; Damascus Police	Free Syrian Army; Damascus Military Council; Jaysh al-Islam; Rebel elements from Idlib, Raqqa, Hama and Homs; Abu Ubaidah ibn al-Jarrah Battalion; Muawiyah bin Abi-Sufyan Battalion; (Palestine) Several local Palestinian militias; Ahrar al-Sham; Battalions of Hamza ibn Abdul-Muttalib

Strength
(Syria) Unknown	2,500–5,000 militants (start of the battle); 1,500 militants from Idlib

Casualties and losses
(Syria) 92–97 soldiers and policemen killed (Syria) 130 soldiers and policemen wounded (Syria) 3 tanks and 1 armored car destroyed (Syria) 1 armored car captured (Syria) 3 Mil Mi-8 helicopters shot down (Syria) 300 soldiers and policemen killed (opposition claim)	300 militants killed Hundreds arrested 14 vehicles destroyed (government claim)
- 140+ civilians killed
- Figures updated to 19 July
- Location within Syria

The Battle of Damascus (Arabic: معركة دمشق), also known as Operation Damascus Volcano (Arabic: عملية بركان دمشق), started on 15 July 2012 during the Syrian civil war. Thousands of rebels infiltrated Damascus from the surrounding countryside. Following this, according to some reports, the opposition forces launched an operation to capture the capital, while according to other reports, the military learned of the large-scale rebel operation beforehand and made a preemptive strike. Some reports even suggested the rebels launched the operation prematurely due to their plans being discovered by the security forces.

After the rebels initially captured half a dozen districts and killed four high-ranking government ministers in a bombing, opposition forces were forced to retreat following a military counter-attack, leaving the army in control of the capital after three weeks of fighting. It was the first time tanks and helicopters had been deployed in central Damascus and left parts of the city as a warzone.

== Battle ==
=== Operation Damascus Volcano ===
Attack routes of the Free Syrian Army during Operation Damascus Volcano

On 15 July, fierce fighting was reported in some quarters of central Damascus as the army moved in to dislodge rebels. The rebels fighting were the ones who were routed from Douma and other suburbs and fled to Damascus itself. Fighting also closed the road leading from central Damascus to the airport. The rebels were also on the offensive, attacking the Hajar al-Aswad district.

On 16 July, for a second day, heavy clashes in the southern Midan and Tadhamon districts of Damascus raged with the military managing to surround the rebel forces in the area and sending tanks and other armored vehicles into the neighbourhoods. The FSA had reportedly taken control of the two districts earlier and the military was making attempts to overrun it. The rebels called the clashes a raid by them against the capital, while the government called it a 48-hour military operation to clear the area of any opposition forces. There were also indications that the government knew about the planned rebel raid and acted on the information. According to state TV, the military killed over 80 rebel fighters during the fighting.

On 17 July, shooting was reported in one of the main central streets and machine-gun fire was reported in nearby Sabaa Bahrat Square, site of the Central Bank of Syria, which was the scene of several major pro-government demonstrations. A brief firefight also erupted near the Syrian parliament building. Fighting was ongoing in the southern Midan and Kfar Sousa districts and the northern Barzeh and Qaboun districts. Artillery shelling was reported in all of them and specifically in Midan it was reported to be "hysterical", according to activists. At the same time, in Barzeh and Qaboun, helicopter rocket strikes were reported. Later, helicopter strikes were reportedly hitting all four neighbourhoods. The state-run news agency reported that rebel forces had retreated from the Nahr Aisha district to Midan, where fighting was continuing. Army reinforcements were sent from the Golan Heights to help defend the capital. This was confirmed by Israeli army intelligence. "The Syrian military is acting very brutally, which shows the regime is desperate. Its control of Damascus is getting weaker", Major General Aviv Kochavi told a parliamentary committee in Israel.

The rebels claimed to have killed 70 soldiers and pro-government militiamen in the previous two days of clashes, while the government reported 14 rebel vehicles were destroyed and an army officer stated that they killed 33 rebels, wounded 15 and captured 145 in the day's fighting in the Qaboun area, where the majority of opposition forces were reportedly. An activist, Shakeeb al-Jabri, claimed that more than 200 soldiers had been killed or wounded in total. A deputy police chief, Brigadier General Issa Duba, was said to have died from wounds sustained during the clashes, according to a pro-Assad website. The FSA stated they destroyed one armored vehicle and captured another and that, among the members of the Syrian military who were killed, were several rooftop snipers. The opposition also claimed to have shot down an army helicopter in the Qaboun district.

There were contradictions among the rebels themselves on the nature of the conflict. One FSA commander declared that the "battle for liberation of Damascus had begun". The FSA dubbed their assault Operation Damascus Volcano. But Tarek, the rebel spokesman in Damascus, stated the clashes were still only skirmishes. He also said the FSA didn't start the battle, which would be in line with earlier reports that the military made a preemptive strike on the opposition forces, after learning of their plan for the attack on the capital. Government Information Minister Omran Zoabi stated that the military confronted rebel forces who infiltrated the city, surrounded them and forced many to retreat, while the rest were still being dealt with. RT reporter Maria Finoshina stated that fighting was nowhere near the level she experienced during the government assault on the suburb of Douma the previous week. She said that except for continuing occasional gunfire and military patrols "it doesn't seem like final or decisive battle for the capital". Several videos of the fighting in the capital emerged during the day.

=== Damascus bombing ===
On 18 July, Syrian state TV reported that a suicide attack that targeted National Security headquarters in Damascus killed Syrian defense minister General Daoud Rajha during a meeting of ministers and a number of heads of security agencies. Many other VIPs were wounded and killed in the attack as well. Also killed were Assef Shawkat, Bashar al-Assad's brother-in-law and deputy defense minister, the assistant to the vice president general Hassan Turkomani and Hafez Makhlouf, head of investigations at the Syrian Intelligence Agency. The country's intelligence chief Hisham Bekhityar was seriously wounded (died two days later). There were conflicting reports on the fate of the Interior minister Mohammad Ibrahim al-Shaar with initial accounts stating that he had also been killed, but later state TV reported that he survived although wounded. Additional reports stated that he was in stable condition. The bomber was reportedly a bodyguard of one of the meeting attendant. The opposition meanwhile claimed that the cause of the explosion was not a suicide bomber, but that a rebel insider planted bombs inside of the building and detonated it remotely from a distant location.

Also, during the night, residents reported that an army barracks near the Presidential Palace, about a hundred metres from the presidential palace itself, came under heavy fire with residents posting video showing a fire, but no explosions were heard. Earlier in the day, SANA stated that government troops were pushing into the Midan district. At the same time, SOHR relayed that the Barzeh and Qaboun districts were under helicopter attack. Fighting was also reported in the Kfar Souseh and Nahr Aisha districts.

After the bombing, the Free Syrian Army claimed that army troops had withdrawn from the Midan district. However, less than an hour later, state TV claimed to be broadcasting live footage of clashes in the neighbourhood. According to Al Jazeera, the military shelled the district. Early in the evening, opposition activists reported that Midan was raided by the military. The FSA meanwhile moved its troops to the al-Sabina area. Residents in the Barzeh district, where rebels were holding out earlier, reported that only government troops were to be found in the neighbourhood's streets.

Opposition activists claimed that Syrian army commander Mohammad al-Bardan defected to the rebel side along with his soldiers and Al Arabiya reported that soldiers from 3rd Armored Division were withdrawing from several Damascus districts and leaving their tanks behind following the bombing. However, this was not independently confirmed or relayed by other news media. Reuters reported that the Syrian Army escalated its response to the bombing by firing on suburbs from artillery batteries located on a mountain overlooking Damascus. Al Jazeera, meanwhile, reported that FSA was able to shoot down two helicopters that had been shelling Tadamon and Al-Hajjar al-Aswad districts. As before, this report could not be independently verified due to restrictions placed on the journalists. A monitoring group, SOHR, reported that 60 soldiers had been killed on the third and fourth day of fighting.

The security forces gave residents 48 hours to flee the fighting area. One military source told that the army exercised restraint in its response in Damascus but that after the bombing, they would use all their weapons to finish the rebels.

=== Military counter-attack ===
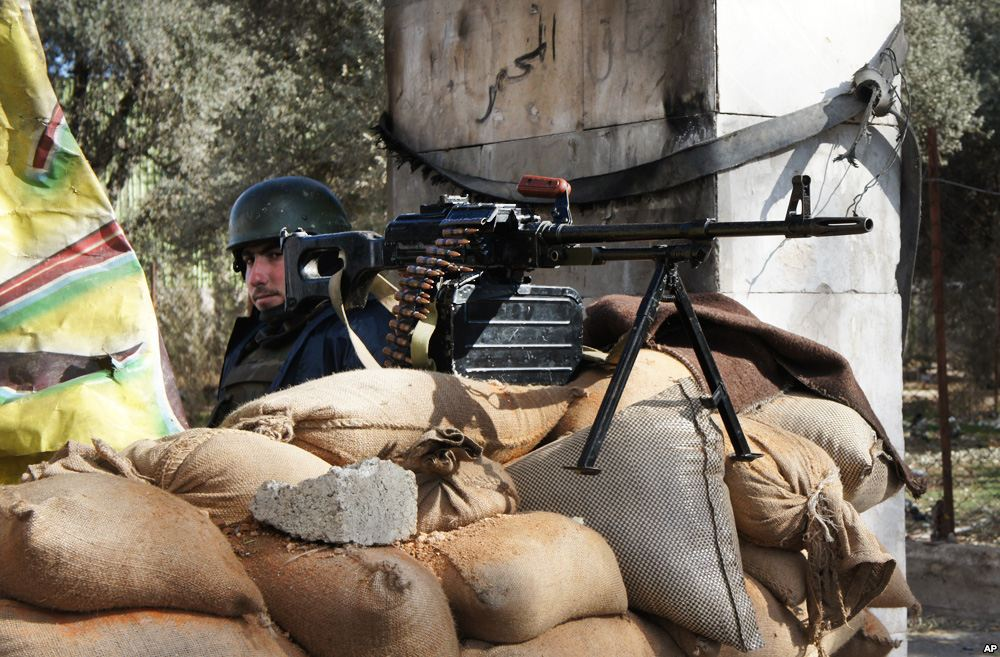
Syrian soldier manning a checkpoint with a PK machine gun

On 19 July, the military launched an offensive to push back rebel forces that infiltrated Damascus. Damascus residents reported ongoing shelling of several districts, including Midan and Kafr Souseh. Residents were meanwhile arming themselves, with many citizens fleeing districts which were hit by ongoing battles. The army removed its checkpoints around Midan district and the ancient Old City for reasons unknown.

Afterwards, opposition groups accused the Syrian army in massacring 100 civilians that had been shot and killed by security forces gunfire during a funeral procession in al-Sayida Zainab on the outskirts of Damascus. However, later reports by opposition groups revised the toll to at least 60. Meanwhile, the FSA reportedly shelled Damascus International Airport with mortars 20 times.

It was reported that the president, Bashar al-Assad, was in the coastal city of Latakia, directing the fighting in Damascus. However, it was unclear if he traveled there from Damascus before or after the bombing attack. One opposition official stated that they had information he may have been in Latakia for days. Meanwhile, following the Damascus bombing, his mother and sister went to Tartus. Also, rumors circulated around Damascus that al-Assad's wife, Asma, had gone to Russia. During the day, al-Assad was shown on state TV attending the swearing-in of his new defense minister.

An activist based in the eastern Damascus district Mezze said in interview with The Guardian that rebels had taken control over the Midan and Qaboun districts with fighting raging in Kafr Souseh and Mezze. He also claimed three tanks were destroyed in Kafr Souseh by the FSA.

Later that day, the Syrian Army stormed the Qaboun district with a large number of tanks, according to the opposition group Syrian Observatory, who said the army's move stoked fears of an imminent massacre in the area. Earlier, rebels attacked the central police command in Old Damascus, killing five officers. That night, Syrian state TV broadcast footage of Qaboun, showing the corpses of about 20 dead rebels. The opposition group, Syrian Observatory, said that 23 rebels and 47 alleged civilians were killed in Damascus during the day.

The following day, security sources told AFP that the Army had launched a general offensive in Damascus. The Syrian Army continued its counter-attack, storming the quarter of Jobar in Damascus, searching for rebels. The Syrian official press agency stated that the army inflicted heavy losses on the rebels in Qaboun and that the Syrian Army regained control of Midan. The rebels confirmed this stating they had been forced to withdraw from Midan after the army assault.

Rebel fighters stormed and burned the Sa'iqa military camp, which was being used as a training facility, in the Basateen al-Mezzeh district in central Damascus according to activists.

At the end of 20 July, Damascus center and areas beyond were reported to be under firm government control with some fighting continuing only in the outskirts. The rebels who were fighting near the Yarmouk camp were overrun by the Army and the Palestinian factions loyal to the government.

On 21 July, a security source told AFP that the Army took control of Tadamon, Qaboun and Barzeh, in addition to Midan, the previous day, but that fighting was still ongoing in the Jobar, Kfar Sousa and Mazeeh quarters. It was later confirmed that Barzeh was still rebel-held. Activists claimed that fighting was still reported in Damascus proper, with clashes in the northern Barzeh and Rukneddine districts and that a police station was attacked on Khaled bin Waleed street, with an activist saying rebels in Damascus were staging hit-and-run attacks as opposed to controlling areas. Still, during the morning, the city was largely calm according to residents. SOHR said the military bombarded the Al-Kaddam and Assali neighbourhoods of Damascus. Residents also reported fighting in the Al-Hajar Al-Aswad and Tadamon districts.

Undated online video posted by activists appeared to show the local police station being overrun at Yarmouk and clashes were reported in the Northern suburb of al-Tal, where the head of the local Political Security Directorate (PSD) branch and all his staff reportedly surrendered to FSA fighters. Twelve civilians were reported killed during the day, seven of them by sniper fire. However, Reuters confirmed that the city was calm and that the police checkpoints which had been abandoned during the fighting were back.

During the day, Brig. Gen. Nabil Zougheib, a Christian, was assassinated along with his wife and two sons. The Brigade of Islam rebel group claimed responsible for the killings. Islamist fighters from the Muslim Brotherhood also reportedly attacked Iraqi refugees in the southeastern part of the city.

On 22 July, fierce fighting was reported along with intense shelling by reporters. Activists said that helicopter gunships fired rockets into a southern Damascus neighbourhood. A journalist reported that helicopters were also shelling Barzeh.

Later, the Syrian Army led by the Fourth division stormed the district of Barzeh. The Fourth division also routed the rebels out of Mezzeh after 1,000 troops entered the district backed up by armoured vehicles, tanks and bulldozers. The military continued their advance by forcing the rebels to withdraw from Rukn al-Din. State media reported that the soldiers were pursuing the last remnants of the rebels. By the end of the day, activists confirmed that Barzeh was also overrun by government troops and that at least five young men, possibly rebels, were summarily executed. The rebel operation to capture Damascus seemed close to collapse according to a journalist and activists reported that army soldiers executed at least 20 unarmed men in Mezzeh that they suspected of aiding rebels.

Syrian State media showed graphic images of foreign Arab fighters killed in Qaboun, including two Egyptians and three Jordanians, identified by their identity papers. The next day, the bodies of 23 people, who were reportedly "executed" in Mezze and Barzeh, were found, some of which had torture marks.

Meanwhile, the Israeli military confirmed that president Assad, along with his family, was still in the capital, contradicting earlier reports that they left the city for Latakia.

=== FSA retreat ===
On 23 July, the government declared most of the rebel forces that attacked the capital to be defeated. An opposition activist confirmed this by saying that government troops had taken control of almost all of the capital. Following this, there were disagreements between rebel commanders about the opportunity of having launched the Damascus battle as rebel colonel Riad al-Asaad disagreed with rebel colonel Qasem Saadedine who started the operation. The opposition activist group SOHR stated that 94 people were killed during the previous two days of fighting.

A man claiming to be a civilian from Midan said, "Midan is back to normal. There were some militias who tried to control the neighbourhood, but the army came in. The [rebel] fighters were from outside Midan. Now it is free of all military opposition presence." In regards to the reported executions he said, "I can't confirm or deny it. But I don't think execute is the right word. These people are fighters. They are not civilians. If they were killed it doesn't mean they were executed, and they were not captured and then killed. They were killed during the operation." He also added that Mezzeh was not fully under government control, with the eastern orchard being a hideout for rebels. He added, "People are being encouraged to come back to Damascus. There's been a big media campaign by al-Jazeera and al-Arabiya making people believe that the whole area was under rebel control, but they only controlled some streets." Asked about Assad's whereabouts he said, "I know he is in Damascus. The new minister of defence took the oath of office in the presidential palace with the president. This is the same room they have used for years." However, other civilians were terrified for Government reprisals to speak openly in front of a camera. Alex Thompson stated that in his journey to Midan terrified locals told him that "They used cannons, mortar, machine guns, tanks, they used helicopters—they use everything against us." Others said that the pro-government militia—shabiba—massacred a family of sixteen in the district. Thompson claimed that the incident resembled the same "story we heard of Al-Houla" with "The familiar pattern of heavy shelling and bombardment followed by militia going house to house looting and massacring." Thompson described a scene in Midan of pulverised buildings and bodies lying on the streets.

The corpses of 24 executed rebel fighters were found on 24 July in the suburbs of Daraya. Meanwhile, several shells hit the southern suburb of Hajar al-Aswad. The opposition reported that the Syrian Army attacked the last rebel pockets in the Damascus districts of Qaddam and al Hajar-Aswad. In other parts of the city, journalist Alex Thompson described that the battle as a victory for the Syrian Army, and a morale boost for the regime. In the evening, activists confirmed that most of the rebels had withdrawn from the capital.

=== The battle concludes ===
The rebel-held town of Al-Tal, on the outskirts of Damascus, was heavily bombarded on 25 July by the 216th Mechanized Battalion of the Syrian Army. Residents and opposition activists reported that residential buildings were hit. On the same day, opposition activists released amateur footage of what they claimed were the bodies of 23 people in various houses who were "massacred" during the previous days in the Qaboun district.

On 26 July, fighting was reported in the Hajar al-Aswad district of the capital, a place described as one of the last rebel strongholds in Damascus. The FSA withdrew to the district which was subsequently shelled by government forces. According to an opposition activist, clashes continued across most of the southern part of the city. Five civilians were reportedly killed. The army also attacked the Yarmouk Palestinian refugee camp, despite there being no rebel presence. Residents mentioned tanks, helicopter gunships and snipers who shot at anyone in the street. The FSA were reported to be in the district of Tadamon and shelling was still reported in the neighbourhoods of Orouba and Thalathin.

On 29 July, SANA reported that government troops had cleared the Hajar al-Aswad district of rebel forces and the government declared "victory" in the capital.

Following the retreat of rebel forces from much the city, fighting continued. Rebel remnants, that did not pull back from Damascus with the other opposition forces, converged on the Tadamon district, where they made the area their final stronghold. The military launched an operation on 1 August to clear them out and by 3 August dozens of military vehicles had entered the district. During the fighting, on 2 August, mortars hit the nearby Yarmouk Palestinian refugee camp, killing 15 to 21 people.

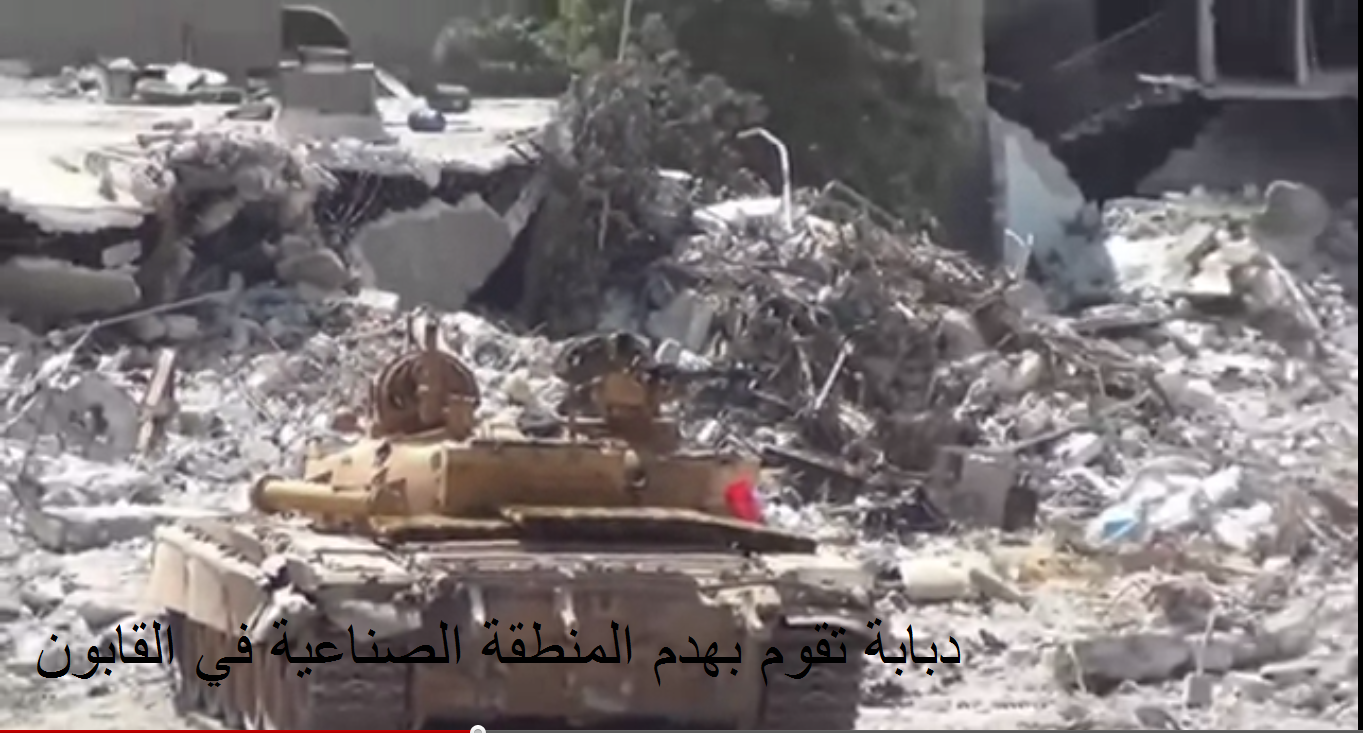
Tank of the government forces in Qaboun, 2012

On 1 August, at the same time as the Tadamon operation started, the military raided the town of Jdaidet Artuz, southwest of Damascus, rounding up around 100 people suspected of being rebel sympathisers or opposition activists. The detainees were taken to a school where they were reportedly tortured and 43 of them were executed, according to SOHR. Syrian state media reported that the armed group located in the city was defeated, with dozens of insurgents killed, and that most of the others surrendered later. A picture of some prisoners was then published. The State media also reported that similar successful operations on Yalda and Babila took place against the insurgents. On 4 August, the Tadamon district was cleared of insurgents and the general who led the operation, which involved special forces, announced during a press tour of the quarter that the whole of Damascus had been secured and was under the full control of the Syrian Army. The Syrian Army reported that there were 800 rebels in Tadamon, and that 300 of them had been killed in the last assault.

Upon retaking the capital Damascus, the Syrian government began a campaign of collective punishment against the civilian residents of suburbs in-and-around the capital, massacring at least 41 civilians.

== Aftermath ==
Situation in Damascus 15 August 2012

Following the battle, the FSA stated that they were to conduct guerrilla hit-and-run attacks against security forces in the capital in the future.

On 11 August, the Syrian army clashed with rebels in the heart of Damascus near the Syrian central bank according to state TV and residents. An explosion was followed by fighting which appeared to be spreading, said the resident, who asked not to be named for fear of arrest. "The explosion was huge. There has been fighting for the past half an hour along Pakistan Street. I am very close. Can you hear that?" she asked, to the sound of a loud bang.

On 15 August, the Free Syrian Army claimed it was behind a bomb attack on a military base near the UN hotel in central Damascus. Three people were injured. Afterwards, fighting between rebels and government forces took place in Mezzeh, near the Iranian embassy, and in the districts of Tadamon and Yarmouk. Also, al-Qadam and al-Asali were reportedly bombarded by the military and residents reported heavy gunfire. The military also freed the Al-Ikhbariya TV news team after an operation in the Damascus countryside. Another nine people were also reportedly freed in other operations.

The same day, the military launched a new offensive, with the aim of clearing rebel forces from towns around Damascus. During the operation, the Army captured the rebel-held towns of Al-Tall, Mouadamiya and Daraya, and the southern Damascus districts of Kfar Souseh and Nahr Aisha. During the attack on Daraya, the army reportedly committed a massacre, putting the blame on FSA (see Darayya massacre).

On 26 September, Iranian state-sponsored Press TV correspondent Maya Nasser was shot and killed by a sniper while reporting live.

In the later half of 2012, Qasem Soleimani assumed personal control of the Iranian involvement in the Syrian civil war, when the Iranians became deeply concerned about the Assad government's inability to fight the opposition, and the negative consequences to the Islamic Republic if the Syrian government fell. Soleimani reportedly coordinated the war from a base in Damascus, as the rebels came close to government headquarters by digging underground tunnels, according to Hossein Amir-Abdollahian.

== See also ==
- Battle of Aleppo (2012–2016)
- Siege of Deir ez-Zor (2014–2017)
- Fall of Damascus (2024)
