= Abyad wa Aswad =

Political magazine in Syria

- Categories: Political magazine
- Frequency: Weekly
- Founded: 2001
- First issue: 22 July 2002; 23 years ago
- Country: Syria
- Based in: Damascus
- Language: Arabic
- Website: https://www.abyadwaaswad.com/

Abyaḍ wa Aswad (Arabic: أبيض وأسود, lit. 'Black and White') is an Arabic independent weekly political culture magazine published in Damascus, Syria. The magazine is privately owned.

== History and profile ==
Abyad wa Aswad was established in early 2001. Publication license was granted in 2002, making the magazine the first independent political weekly in Syria. The first issue appeared on 22 July 2002. The magazine, headquartered in Damascus, is a privately owned publication. Bilal Turkmani, former defense minister Hasan Turkmani's son, is the owner of Abyad wa Aswad.

The magazine adopts a critical attitude towards the activities of the Syrian government and contains reform-oriented articles. For instance, the magazine criticized the Syrian foreign ministry in 2003 for not attending the special session of the UN Security Council during which UN Security Council resolution 1483 that was about ending the sanctions against Iraq had been voted. It further argued that both the foreign ministry and other governmental bodies had no dynamism and flexibility.
