= Syrian Crisis =

Syrian Crisis may refer to:

- Levant Crisis of 1945
- Syrian Crisis of 1957
- Syrian Civil War (2011–2024)
- Syrian Crisis Cell, a security committee established by the Syrian government to coordinate the response to the Syrian Civil War
- Aftermath of the Syrian civil war (2024–present)
