= Ali Aslan =

Former Chief of the General Staff of the Syrian Army

- علي أصلان
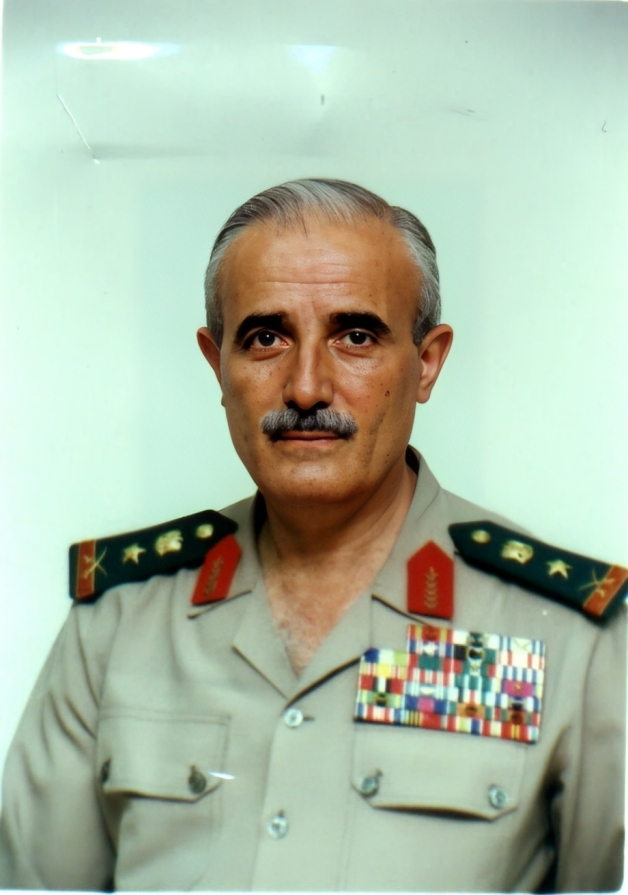
- Aslan in 2000

Chief of the General Staff of the Syrian Arab Army
- In office 8 July 1998 – 23 January 2002
- President: Hafez al-Assad; Bashar al-Assad
- Preceded by: Hikmat al-Shihabi
- Succeeded by: Hasan Turkmani

Military Advisor to the Presidency of the Syrian Arab Republic
- In office 2003–2023
- President: Bashar al-Assad
- Succeeded by: Ali Mamlouk

Personal details
- Born: 1932 (age 93–94) Latakia, French Mandate of Syria
- Party: Ba'ath Party
- Spouse: Almaza Kamel Hassan (d. 2024)

Military service
- Allegiance: Second Syrian Republic (1954–1958); United Arab Republic (1958–1961); Second Syrian Republic (1961–1963); Ba'athist Syria (1963–2002)
- Branch/service: Syrian Army
- Years of service: 1954–2002
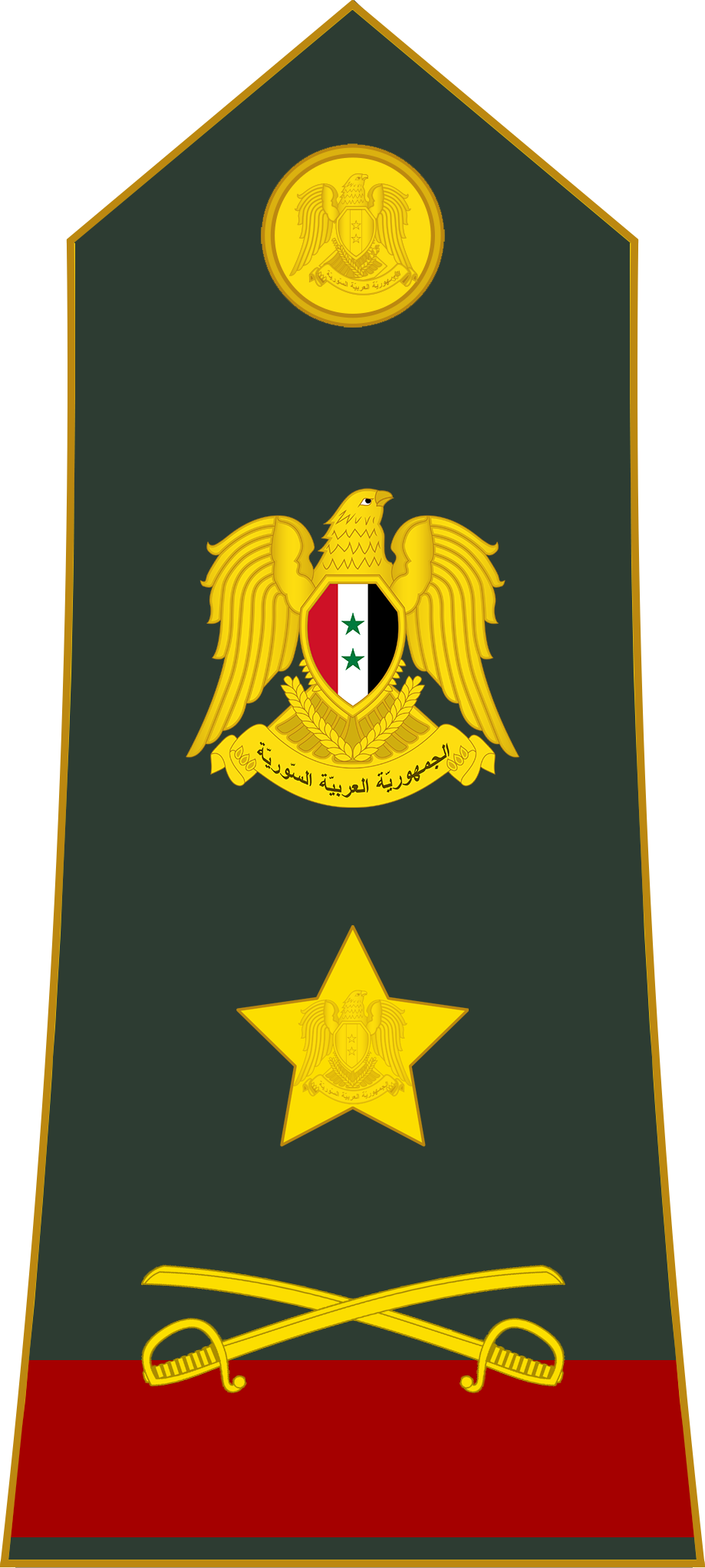
- Rank: Lieutenant general
- Unit: 8th Infantry Brigade; 1st Infantry Division; 5th Mechanized Division; 2nd Corps
- Battles/wars: Six-Day War; Yom Kippur War; Lebanese Civil War; Syrian intervention; 1982 Lebanon War; Islamist uprising in Syria

Ali Aslan (Arabic: علي أصلان; born 1932) is a retired Syrian military officer. He served as chief of staff of the Syrian Arab Armed Forces, and was a member of the Central Committee of the Ba'ath Party and a close confidant of the late Syrian president Hafez al-Assad.

Aslan was not only considered to be powerful member of the late Hafez al-Assad's inner circle, but he was also regarded by outside observers as having significantly improved Syrian military readiness while operating under severe financial constraints.

== Early life ==
Aslan hails from an Alawite family which is part of the same Kalbiyya tribe as Hafez al-Assad. He was born in 1932.

== Career ==
Aslan commanded 5th mechanized infantry in 1973.

At the beginning of the 1980s Aslan was deputy chief of staff and head of operations.

After the death of Hafez al-Assad in 2000, a 9-member committee was formed to oversee the transition period, and Aslan was among its members. In addition, he became a member of the Baath Party's central committee in the Summer of 2000. Aslan was one of the senior officials, who contributed to secure the rule of Bashar al-Assad. However, he was relieved from his post as chief of staff by Bashar al-Assad in January 2002, as part of the younger president's program of reform and after reported clashes with Assef Shawkat regarding personnel changes. Aslan was replaced by his then deputy, Hassan Turkmani. Aslan was later appointed military advisor to the president. In June 2005, Aslan was removed from the central committee of the Baath Party, and he retired from politics.

His nephew Qusay was married to Bashar al-Assad's cousin, Falak Jamil, but they divorced.

== Honours ==
=== National honours ===
- Syria:
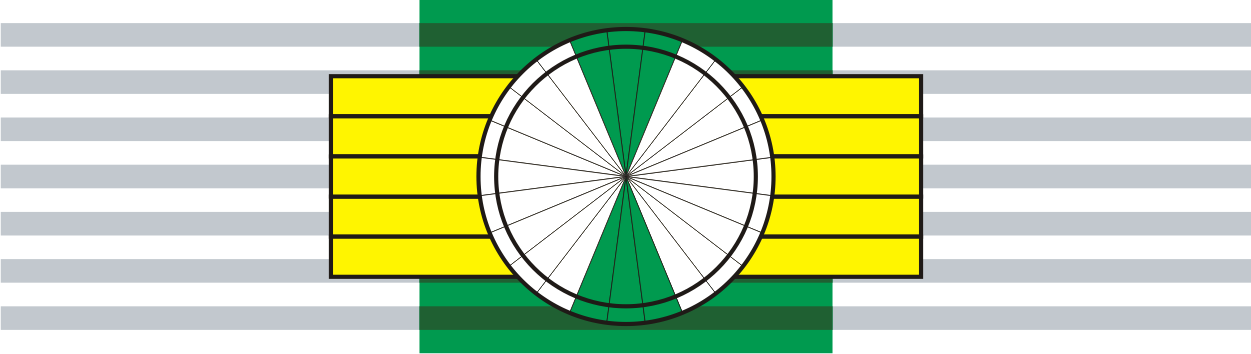
  - Order of Civil Merit (Excellent class) (2021)
