= Hasan Turkmani =

Syrian politician (1935–2012)

Lieutenant General Hasan Turkmani
- حسن توركماني

Deputy Vice President for Military Affairs
- In office 3 June 2009 – 18 July 2012
- President: Bashar al-Assad
- Prime Minister: Muhammad Naji al-Otari; Adel Safar; Riyad Farid Hijab

13th Minister of Defense
- In office 12 May 2004 – 3 June 2009
- Preceded by: Mustafa Tlass
- Succeeded by: Ali Habib Mahmud

18th Chief of Staff of the Syrian Army
- In office 23 January 2002 – 12 May 2004
- Preceded by: Ali Aslan
- Succeeded by: Ali Habib Mahmud

Member of the Regional Command of the Syrian Regional Branch
- In office 9 June 2005 – 18 July 2012

Personal details
- Born: Hasan Ali Turkmani; 1 January 1935 Aleppo, French Mandate of Syria
- Died: 18 July 2012 (aged 77) Damascus, Syria
- Party: Ba'ath Party

Military service
- Allegiance: Second Syrian Republic (1955–1958); United Arab Republic (1958–1961); Second Syrian Republic (1961–1963); Ba'athist Syria (1963–2012)
- Branch/service: Syrian Arab Army
- Years of service: 1955–2012
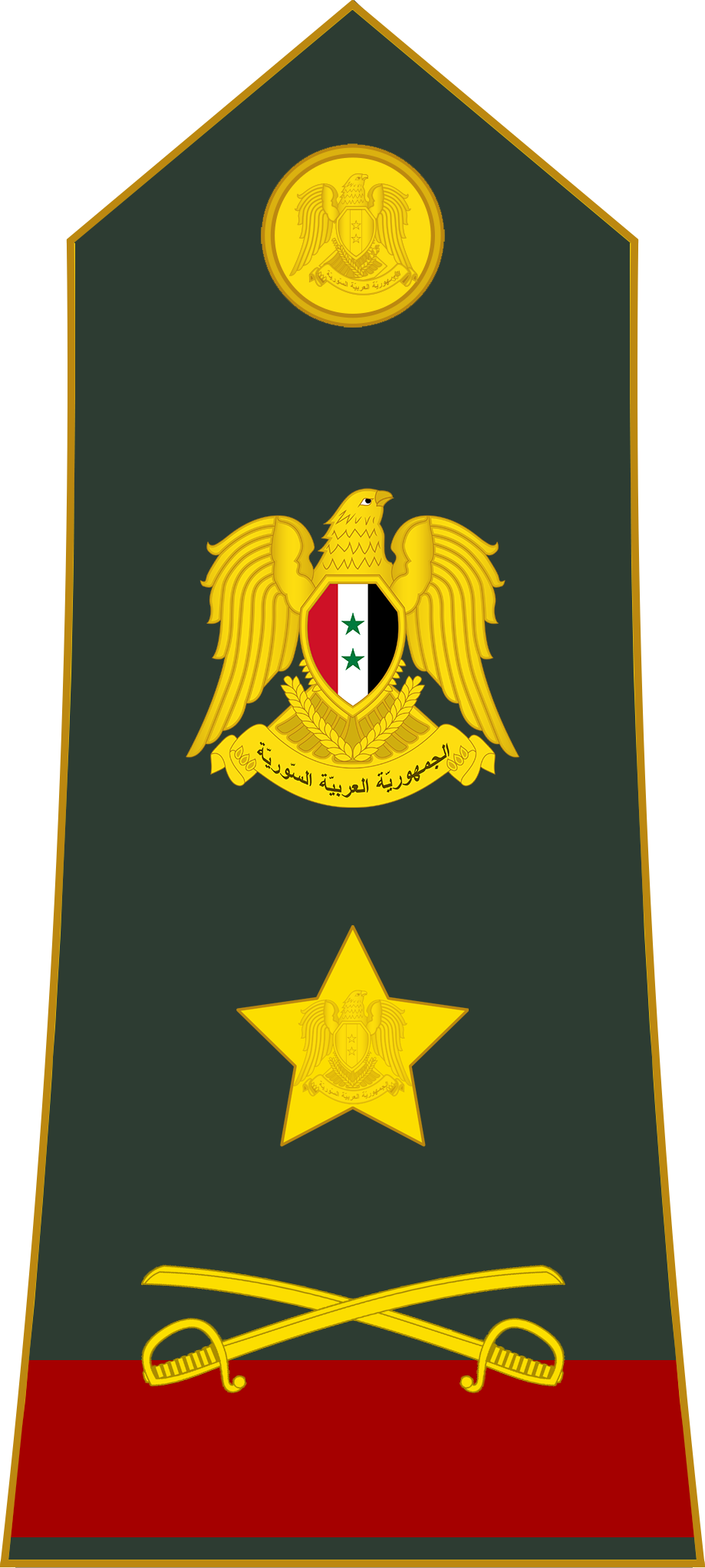
- Rank: Lieutenant General
- Battles/wars: Six-Day War; Yom Kippur War; Syrian Civil War

Hasan Ali Turkmani (Arabic: حسن توركماني; 27 January 1935 – 18 July 2012) was a Syrian military officer and politician who served as Syria's Minister of Defense from 2004 to 2009.

He was among four top Syrian government officials killed in a bombing in Damascus on 18 July 2012.

== Early life ==
Hasan Turkmani was born in Aleppo in 1935 into a Syrian Sunni Muslim family of Turkmen origin.

== Career ==
Turkmani joined the Syrian Army in 1955 as an infantry officer. He was one of the first officers to graduate on the new mechanized units of the BMP-1 and BTR-60 armoured vehicles. He completed a staff course for combined arms operations from East Germany in 1965, and a Command and Staff Course from Egypt in 1969. He commanded the 9th Mechanized Infantry Division which fought a crucial rearguard action around Damascus in 1973. He was promoted to the rank of major general in 1975. Turkmani also began to serve as a member of the central committee of the Baath Party beginning in 2000. He was the deputy chief of staff in the Syrian army until 2002. He was appointed chief of staff on 23 January 2002, replacing Ali Aslan. Since he was a Sunni Muslim, his appointment was considered as a move to restore a touch of sectarian diversity to Syria's military-intelligence establishment, which had been dominated by Alawites.

On 12 May 2004, he became defense minister, replacing Mustafa Tlass. On the other hand, Ali Habib Mahmoud succeeded Turkmani as chief of staff. In June 2006, Turkmani visited Tehran and signed a strategic alliance agreement with his Iranian counterpart Mustafa Mohammad Najjar to form a joint defense committee.

Turkmani was replaced in June 2009 by the former army chief Ali Habib Mahmud as defense minister. On 3 June 2009, President Bashar Assad appointed Turkmani as assistant vice president with the rank of minister. He was also appointed chief of crisis operations and was widely blamed for the campaign of torture in Syria. In addition, Turkmani was a military advisor to Vice Fresident Farouk Sharaa.

In June 2011, President Bashar al-Assad send a special military and security delegation led by General Hasan Turkmani to the Turkish capital of Ankara to meet Turkish Prime Minister Recep Tayyip Erdoğan. On 15 June 2011, Turkmani said that they would discuss relations between Turkey and Syria, congratulate Erdoğan on his election victory and thank him welcoming Syrian refugees into the country.

== Rumoured death ==
On 19 May 2012, the Free Syrian Army's (FSA) Damascus council announced that one of their operatives from the FSA's Al Sahabeh battalion had successfully poisoned all eight members of Bashar Assad's Central Crisis Management Cell (CCMC), a group of top military officials who ran the Syrian army's daily operations. The Free Syrian Army's Damascus council said they believed at least six of the eight members, including Turkmani, Assef Shawkat, Mohammad al-Shaar, Daoud Rajha, Hisham Ikhtiyar and Mohammad Said Bakhtian, had been killed. Mohammad al-Shaar, then interior minister, and Hasan Turkmani, then assistant vice president, denied their rumoured deaths on State TV, calling it "categorically baseless".

== Assassination and funeral ==
Hasan Turkmani was assassinated on 18 July 2012 in a bombing by opposition militants on a meeting of the Central Crisis Management Cell (CCMC) at the national security building in Rawda Square, north-west Damascus, where the minister of defense Dawoud Rajiha, his deputy Assef Shawkat and other top officials were also killed. Turkmani died of his wounds after the attack. Dozens of civiliants were injured. A state funeral was held for him, Dawoud Rajiha and Assef Shawkat in Damascus on 20 July 2012.

== Personal life ==
Hasan Turkmani's son Muhammad Bilal owned the weekly political magazine Abyad wa Aswad ("Black and White" in English).
