= 18 July 2012 Damascus bombing =

Bombing in Damascus

- Part of the 2012 Battle of Damascus during the Syrian Civil War
- Location within Syria
- Location: 33°30′51″N 36°16′43″E; Rawda Square, Damascus, Syria
- Date: 18 July 2012; 14 years ago
- Target: Syrian president Bashar al-Assad and his Cabinet members
- Attack type: Assassination
- Deaths: At least 4
- Injuries: At least 4
- Perpetrator: Undetermined

The 18 July 2012 Damascus bombing, widely known as the "Crisis Cell" bombing, of the National Security headquarters in Rawda Square, Damascus, killed and injured a number of top military and security officials of the Syrian government. Among the dead were the Syrian defense minister and deputy defense minister. The bombing occurred during the Syrian civil war, and is considered to be one of the most notorious events to affect the conflict. Syrian state-controlled television reported that it was a suicide attack while the opposition claimed it was a remotely detonated bomb. The bombing remains unsolved.

== Bombing ==
The attack, during a meeting of the Central Crisis Management Cell comprising ministers and a number of heads of security agencies, resulted in the death of the Syrian Defense Minister General Dawoud Rajiha. Also killed were Assef Shawkat, president Bashar al-Assad's brother-in-law and deputy defense minister, the assistant to the vice president General Hasan Turkmani, and Hafez Makhlouf, head of investigations at the Syrian Intelligence Agency. However, Hafez Makhlouf was also reported to be wounded. The country's intelligence and national security chief Hisham Ikhtiyar was seriously wounded. There were conflicting reports regarding the Interior minister Mohammad al-Shaar with initial accounts stating that he had been killed, but later state TV reported that he had survived although wounded. Additional reports stated that he was in stable condition. Al-Shaar was reported dead later, according to Al Jazeera. Mohammed Saeed Bekheitan, the national secretary of the Ba'ath Party, was also wounded in the bombing. On 20 July 2012, the death of Hisham Ikhtiyar was confirmed by Syrian authorities.

=== Victims ===
- General Dawoud Rajiha – Defense Minister – confirmed dead.
- General Assef Shawkat – President Bashar al-Assad's brother-in-law and Deputy Defense Minister – confirmed dead.
- General Hasan Turkmani – Assistant to the Vice President Farouk al-Sharaa and former Defense Minister – confirmed dead.
- General Hisham Ikhtiyar – Director of the National Security Bureau – confirmed dead.
- General Maher al-Assad – President Bashar al-Assad's younger brother and the commander of the Republican Guard – wounded, reports of him losing a leg.
- Colonel Hafez Makhlouf – President Bashar al-Assad's cousin and head of investigations at the General Security Directorate – wounded
- General Mohammad al-Shaar – Interior Minister – wounded
- General Mohammed Saeed Bekheitan – Assistant National Secretary of the Ba'ath Party and former chief of the National Security Bureau – wounded

=== Perpetrators ===
The bomber was reportedly a bodyguard of one of the meeting's participants. The opposition, meanwhile, claimed that the cause of the explosion was not a suicide bomber, but a rebel insider who planted a bomb inside the building and detonated it remotely from a distant location. Another report said that the bomb was hidden in the briefcase of Syrian Interior Minister Mohammad al-Shaar, who was injured in the blast.

The Salafist Liwa al-Islam ("Brigade of Islam") and the Free Syrian Army both claimed responsibility for the bombing. Louay Almokdad, the Free Syrian Army's logistical coordinator, claimed that the attack was perpetrated by a group of Free Syrian Army members in coordination with drivers and bodyguards working for Assad's high-ranking officials. It was further stated that the two explosive devices, one made of 25 pounds of TNT, and the other a smaller C-4 plastic-explosive device, had been put in the room days before the meeting by a person working for Hisham Ikhtiyar.

According to a 2016 Daily Beast article, former Syrian general Mohamad Khalouf claimed Iran and Assad were actually responsible for the bombing. Khalouf said that the officials killed were more moderate members of the regime whom Iran wanted removed. Bassam Barabandi, a former Syrian diplomat, also blamed Iran. The same Daily Beast article also quoted Syrian intelligence sources that said Assad believed the dead officials were planning a coup against him, and that all investigations into the bombing were blocked. Former US ambassador Robert Stephen Ford said of the bombing, "I don't think we know how it was done."

== Reaction ==
=== Domestic ===
Although there were no statements from President Assad himself, Syrian TV said after the attack that a decree from him named Gen. Fahd Jassem al-Freij, who used to be the army chief of staff, as the new defense minister. Syrian state television said foreign-backed terrorists had carried out the attack. The country's armed forces said in a statement that Syria was "determined to confront all forms of terrorism and chop off any hand that harms national security".

On 19 July 2012, Syrian state television broadcast images of President Assad at the Presidential Palace in Damascus, cutting short speculation fueled by his silence following the attack against his inner circle the previous day. In the images broadcast by the television, Assad was seen in blue suit, receiving the new defense minister, Fahd Jassem al-Freij, after the swearing ceremony. According to Israeli newspaper Haaretz, the state TV announcement appeared aimed at sending the message that Assad is alive, well and still firmly in charge. It said Assad wished the new defense minister good luck but it did not say where the swearing-in took place. Nor did it show any photos or video of the ceremony, as it usually would.

=== International ===
- Iran – The Ministry of Foreign Affairs condemned the bombing, adding that "the only way of resolving the current crisis in Syria is through talks." Iranian ambassador claimed that the bombing had been a work of foreign intelligence agencies and ruled out the possibility of FSA being able to carry out such operation.
- Israel – Defense Minister Ehud Barak urgently summoned intelligence and security officials to discuss possible implications of the rapidly deteriorating situation in Syria. They included Chief of the General Staff of the IDF Lt. Gen. Benny Gantz and heads of the Northern Command, Military Intelligence Department, the Planning Directorate and the various IDF branches.
- Jordan – King Abdullah II stated that this assassination of members of Assad's inner circle is a "tremendous blow to the regime."
- Lebanon – Lebanese foreign minister Adnan Mansour condemned the Damascus bombing.
- Russia – Press secretary of Russian president Vladimir Putin, Dmitry Peskov, said "As a whole the existing exchange of opinions shows that the appraisals of the situation in Syria and final goals of regulating (violence) for both sides coincide".
- South Africa – South Africa strongly condemned the attack and stated that it is opposed to all forms of terrorism and violence.
- Turkey – Prime Minister Recep Tayyip Erdoğan reacted negatively to Syria's explanation of the event.
- United Kingdom – Prime Minister David Cameron said that Assad should step down and added "It is time for the United Nations Security Council to Pass clear and tough messages about sanctions, I believe under Chapter 7 of the U.N., and be unambiguous about it." Foreign Secretary William Hague said that the "incident, which we condemn, confirms the urgent need for a chapter VII resolution of the UN Security Council on Syria."
- United States – Defense Secretary Leon Panetta said that the country was "rapidly spinning out of control", adding that "the international community must bring maximum pressure on Assad to do what's right, to step down and to allow for that peaceful transition".
- Venezuela – The Foreign Ministry condemned the bombing in Damascus and urged foreign powers against military intervention.
- United Nations – UN Secretary-General Ban Ki-moon has strongly condemned the attack and reminded that "acts of violence committed by any party are unacceptable and a clear violation of the six-point plan".

== See also ==
- List of bombings during the Syrian Civil War
