= Ali Habib Mahmud =

Syrian military officer (1939–2020)

Colonel General Ali Habib Mahmud
- علي حبيب محمود
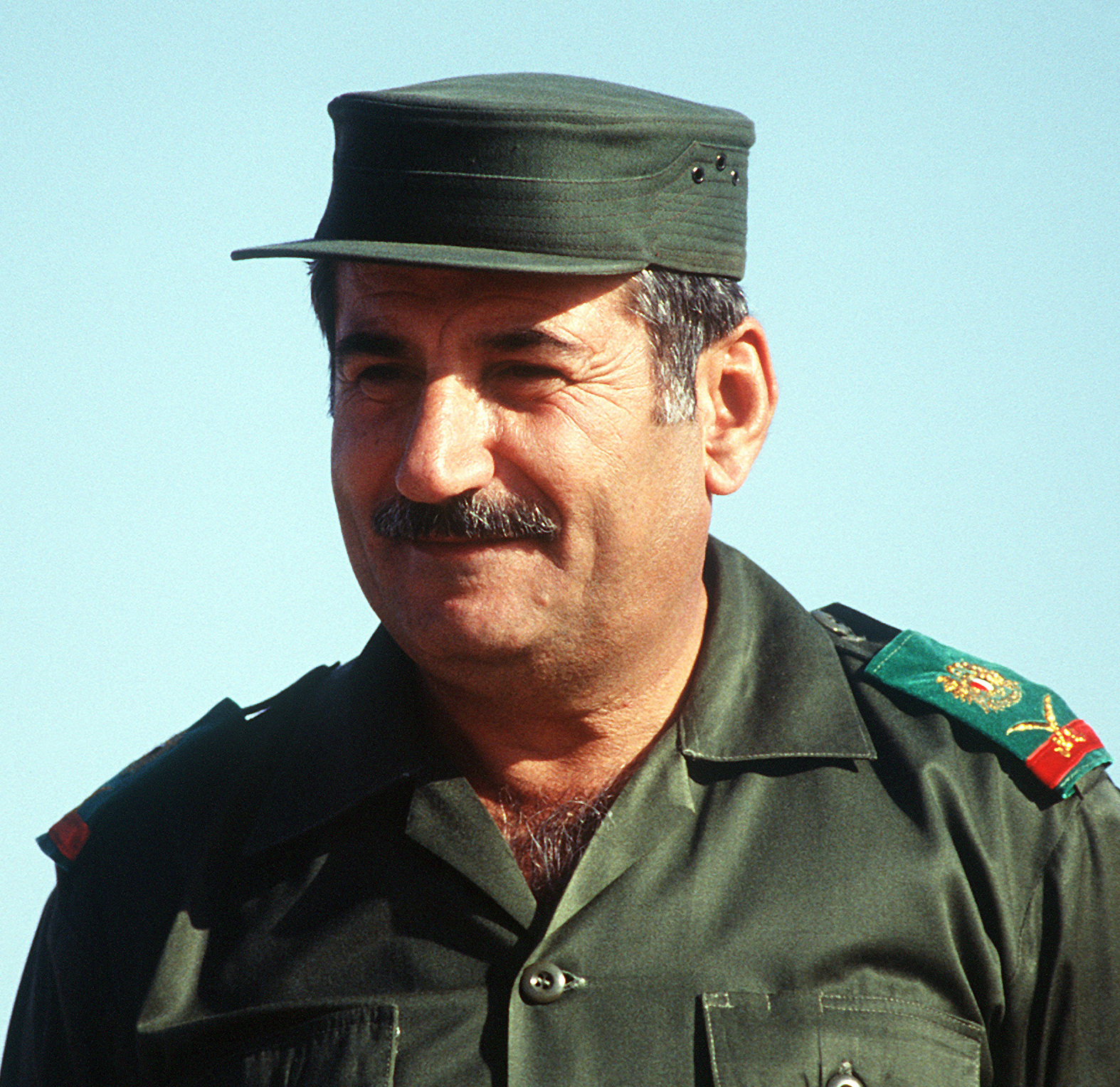
- Mahmud in 1990

14th Minister of Defense
- In office 3 June 2009 – 8 August 2011
- President: Bashar al-Assad
- Prime Minister: Mohammad Najji Outri; Adel Safar
- Preceded by: Hasan Turkmani
- Succeeded by: Dawoud Rajiha

19th Chief of Staff of the Syrian Army
- In office 12 May 2004 – 3 June 2009
- President: Bashar al-Assad
- Preceded by: Hasan Turkmani
- Succeeded by: Dawoud Rajiha

Personal details
- Born: 1 January 1939 Tartus, Syria
- Died: 20 March 2020 (aged 81) Damascus, Syria
- Party: Ba'ath Party

Military service
- Allegiance: United Arab Republic (1959–1961); Second Syrian Republic (1961–1963); Ba'athist Syria (1963–2011)
- Branch/service: Syrian Arab Army
- Years of service: 1959–2011
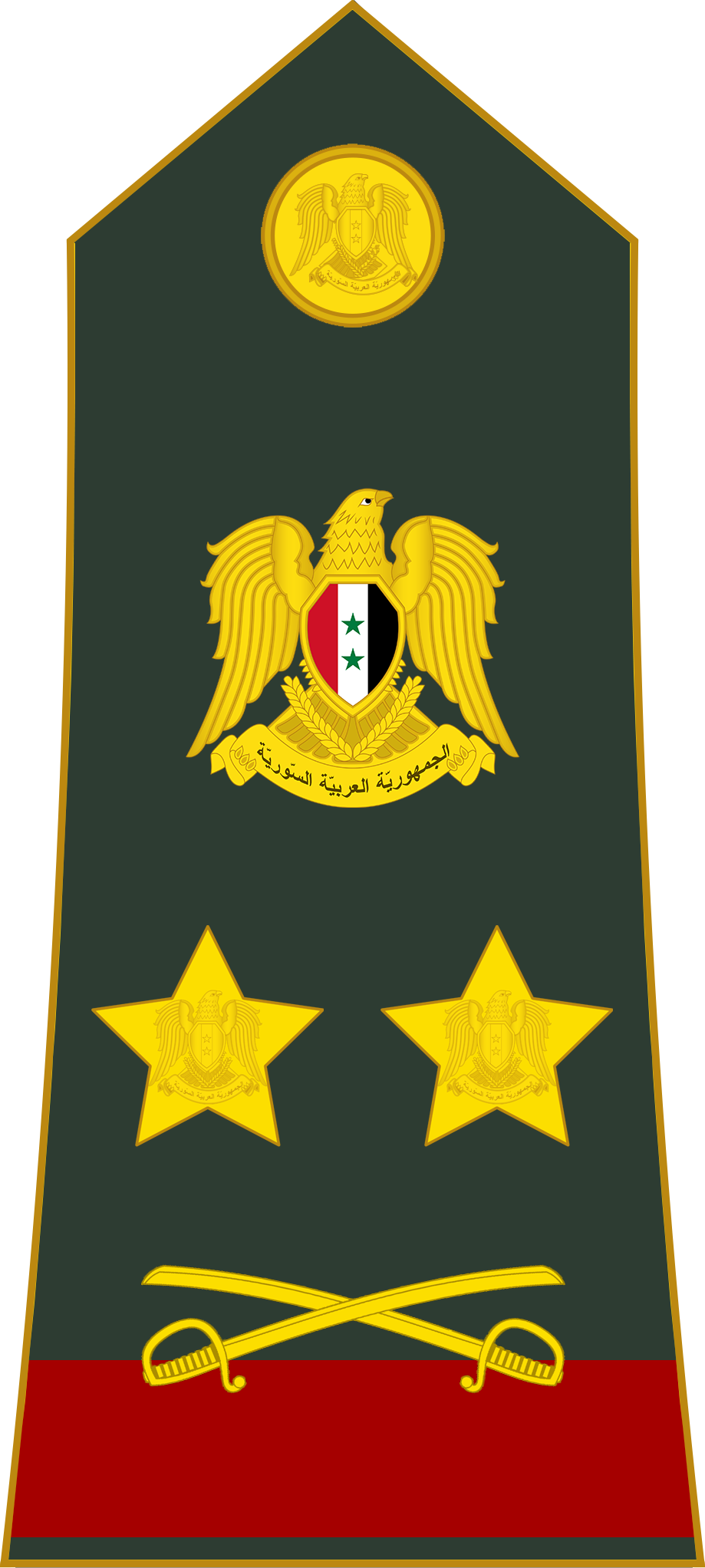
- Rank: Colonel General
- Commands: 1st Armoured Division; 7th Mechanized Division; 14th Special Forces Division
- Battles/wars: Six-Day War; Yom Kippur War; Lebanese Civil War; 1982 Lebanon War; Battle of Sultan Yacoub; Gulf War

Ali Habib Mahmud (Arabic: علي حبيب محمود; 1 January 1939 – 20 March 2020) was a Syrian military officer who served as Syria's minister of defense from June 2009 to August 2011. As one of Syria's most celebrated generals, he was part of President Bashar al-Assad's inner circle.

== Early life and education ==
Mahmud was born into an Alawite family on 1 January 1939 in Tartus and joined the army in 1959. In 1962, he graduated from the military academy.

== Career ==
Mahmud fought in Yom Kippur War against Israel. As a commander of the 1st Division, he also led forces against Israeli troops invading Lebanon in 1982, including the Battle of Sultan Yacoub. He commanded 7th mechanized infantry in 1985. In 1986, Mahmud became a general. He also participated in the Gulf War as part of the international coalition that liberated Kuwait from Saddam Hussein's Iraq in 1991. In 1994, he was appointed commander of the special forces. In 1998, he was promoted to the rank of major general. He was appointed deputy chief of staff in 2002. On 12 May 2004, he was appointed chief of general staff of the Syrian army and the armed forces. He replaced Hasan Turkmani, who was appointed defense minister. In addition, Mahmud was a member of the Baath Party.

On 3 June 2009, President Bashar al-Assad appointed Mahmud as defense minister, replacing again Hasan Turkmani. Mahmud's term ended on 8 August 2011, and he was replaced by Dawoud Rajha in the post.

On 4 September 2013, the opposition wrongly claimed that Mahmud had defected and escaped to Turkey. In fact, he remained in Syria.

=== Sanctions ===
In May 2011, the United States accused Habib of human rights abuses, and announced a travel ban and asset freeze.

== Death ==
On 20 March 2020, Mahmud died in Al Assad University Hospital, Damascus.

Military offices
| Preceded by Hasan Turkmani | Deputy Chief of Staff of Army; 2002–2004 | Succeeded by Dawoud Rajiha |
| Preceded by Hasan Turkmani | Chief of Staff of Army; 2004–2009 | Succeeded by Dawoud Rajiha |
Political offices
| Preceded by Hasan Turkmani | Minister of Defense; 2009–2011 | Succeeded by Dawoud Rajiha |
