= Shaykh Hadid =

Shaykh Hadid شيخ حديد Sheikg Hadid
- Village
- Location in Syria
- Coordinates: 35°21′13″N 36°29′0″E
- Country: Syria
- Governorate: Hama
- District: Mahardah
- Subdistrict: Karnaz

Population (2004)
  - Total: 1,958
- Time zone: UTC+3 (AST)
- City Qrya Pcode: C3467

Shaykh Hadid (Arabic: شيخ حديد) is a Syrian village located in the Karnaz Subdistrict of the Mahardah District in Hama Governorate. According to the Syria Central Bureau of Statistics (CBS), Shaykh Hadid had a population of 1,958 in the 2004 census. Its inhabitants are predominantly Sunni Muslims.
