= Culture Magazine =

American cannabis magazine

- Editor-in-Chief: Jamie Solis
- Associate Editor: Ashley Kern
- Editorial Coordinator: Benjamin M. Adams
- Frequency: Monthly
- Founder: Jeremy Zachary
- Founded: 2009
- Company: High Times
- Country: United States
- Based in: Corona, California
- Language: English
- Website: www.culturemagazine.com

CULTURE Magazine was an American monthly magazine covering entertainment and lifestyle trends in the medical cannabis community. Based in Corona, California, it is owned by High Times which also publishes and own several alternative newspapers and magazines. CULTURE magazine that was distributed throughout California, Colorado, Washington, Michigan, Oregon, South America and Europe.

== History ==
The magazine was founded in 2009 by Jeremy Zachary with the stated mission of informing and entertaining the estimated 500,000-plus medical-cannabis patients in the Greater Southern California area. The first issue was published in June 2009.

Zachary developed his concept for CULTURE after noting a lack of cannabis publications that directly addressed the interests of the average medical-marijuana patient. Most either promoted cannabis cultivation and/or the "stoner" lifestyle. With Southern California’s medical-cannabis industry growing rapidly, Zachary believed a publication was needed that eschewed politics and the "pothead" image and, instead, focused on the general interests and lifestyles of those who used cannabis medicinally.

The Washington edition debuted April 2012, while Bay Area and Colorado started circulation in earlier that January. Michigan premiered later in July 2012, and Oregon which began in late 2013.

On June 21, 2018, it was announced that Culture Magazine was acquired by High Times. Culture Magazine is no longer published.

== Content ==
CULTURE's editorial coverage includes profiles of significant individuals in the medical-cannabis community (scholars, activists, patients, advocates, etc.) as well as news, legal advice, event previews, music, a Destination Unknown travel column, strain and edible reviews, CD/DVD/film/book reviews, recipes, photo galleries and an extensive events calendar. The magazine also highlights users who have overcome life-threatening ailments in their monthly Profiles in Courage segment. Artists, entertainers and celebrities that have appeared on CULTURE's covers have included Whoopi Goldberg, Kathy Bates, Snoop Lion, Dita Von Teese, Mike Epps, Tegan and Sara, Toni Braxton and Melissa Etheridge, in addition to noted cannabis advocates and icons such as Sanjay Gupta, Bill Maher, and Tommy Chong.
