= Dawoud Rajiha =

Minister of Defense (1947–2012)

Colonel General Dawoud Rajiha
- داود راجحة

15th Minister of Defense
- In office 8 August 2011 – 18 July 2012
- President: Bashar al-Assad
- Prime Minister: Adel Safar; Riyad Farid Hijab
- Deputy: Assef Shawkat
- Preceded by: Ali Habib Mahmud
- Succeeded by: Fahd Jassem al-Freij

20th Chief of Army Staff
- In office 3 June 2009 – 8 August 2011
- President: Bashar al-Assad
- Minister: Ali Habib Mahmud
- Preceded by: Ali Habib Mahmud
- Succeeded by: Fahd Jassem al-Freij

Personal details
- Born: Dawoud Abdallah Rajiha; 1947 Damascus, Syria
- Died: 18 July 2012 (aged 64–65) Damascus, Syria
- Cause of death: Assassination
- Party: Ba'ath Party

Military service
- Allegiance: Ba'athist Syria
- Branch/service: Syrian Arab Army
- Years of service: 1967–2012
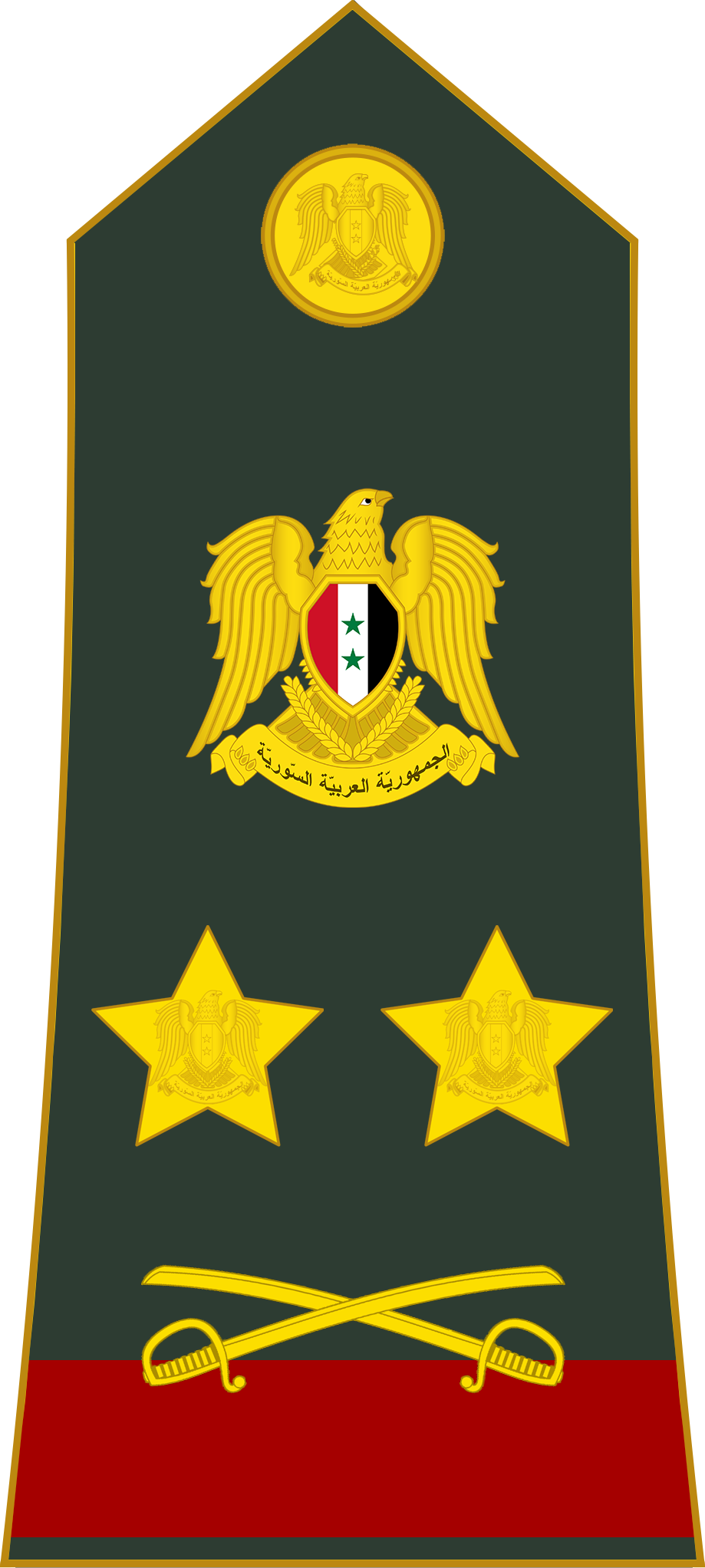
- Rank: Colonel General
- Unit: 3rd Armoured Division, Artillery
- Battles/wars: Yom Kippur War; Lebanese Civil War; Syrian intervention in the Lebanese Civil War; Syrian occupation of Lebanon; Islamist uprising in Syria; 1982 Lebanon War; Gulf War; Syrian Civil War

Dawoud Abdallah Rajiha (Note: forename sometimes transliterated as Dawood or Daoud, surname sometimes transliterated Rajha) (Arabic: داود راجحة; 1947 – 18 July 2012) was a Syrian military officer who served as the Minister of Defense of Syria from August 2011 to July 2012 when he was assassinated along with other senior government officials and military officers in a bombing claimed by Syrian rebel forces during the country's Civil War. From 2009 to 2011, Rajiha served as chief of staff of the Syrian Army.

== Early life ==
Rajiha, a Greek Orthodox Arab Christian, was born in Damascus in 1947. A specialist in artillery, he graduated from Syria's military academy in 1967.

== Military education ==
Dawoud Abdallah Rajiha attended different courses and a higher military education:

- Bachelor in Military Sciences, Field Artillery Officer, Syrian Military Academy
- Staff Course
- General Command and Staff Course
- Higher Staff Course (War Course)

== Career ==
Rajiha attained the rank of colonel general in 1998 and was appointed as the Syrian Army's deputy chief of staff six years later, in 2004. In 2005, he received a promotion to the rank of general called Imad (a rank in the Syrian armed forces between major general and lieutenant general). When Ali Habib Mahmud was named to head the ministry of defense in 2009, Rajiha was given the position of army chief of staff. He held this position in 2011, when the Syrian civil war began. On 8 August 2011, he was chosen by President Bashar al-Assad to replace Mahmud as minister of defense.

== Rumored death ==
On 20 May 2012, the Damascus council of the Free Syrian Army, among the rebel organizations opposed to the Assad government, alleged that it had assassinated Rajiha and the seven other members of the government's Central Crisis Management Cell (CCMC). It was since proven that the allegations were false and were rebels propaganda. Members of the unit, including former minister of defense Hasan Turkmani, were shown on Syrian television to be alive, and the rebels later stated that only Rajiha's deputy, General Assef Shawkat, and a second official who was not named. Shawkat, the brother-in-law of President Assad, was later shown to have survived, as well. In June 2012, the matter of Rajiha's alleged death was permanently resolved when it was confirmed that he remained Assad's defense minister in the newly formed cabinet.

== Assassination and funeral ==
Almost two months after the date of his alleged death, Rajiha was assassinated in a bombing of a meeting of the Central Crisis Management Cell held at the Syrian National Security Building at Rawda Square, Damascus. Among the others killed in the bombing were Hasan Turkmani and Assef Shawkat. Fahd Jassem al-Freij was named by President Assad as Rajiha's successor as minister of defense, while it was announced that Addounia TV would broadcast the minister's funeral. A state funeral was held for him, Hasan Turkmani and Assef Shawkat in Damascus on 20 July 2012. Bashar al-Assad did not participate in the ceremony and was represented by vice president Farouk al-Sharaa. A military ceremony was also held for him and other two senior officials, Hassan Turkmani and Assef Shawkat, in the Tomb of the Unknown Soldier on Mount Qasioun, overlooking Damascus.

== Personal life ==
Rajiha was married and had four children.

== Notes ==
Military offices
Preceded by Ali Habib Mahmud	Deputy Chief of Staff of Army; 2004–2009	Succeeded by Assef Shawkat
Preceded by Ali Habib Mahmud	Chief of Staff of Army; 2009–2011	Succeeded by Fahd Jassem al-Freij
Political offices
Preceded by Ali Habib Mahmud	Minister of Defense; 2011–2012	Succeeded by Fahd Jassem al-Freij
