= Assef Shawkat =

Syrian intelligence officer and politician (1950–2012)

- آصف شوكت
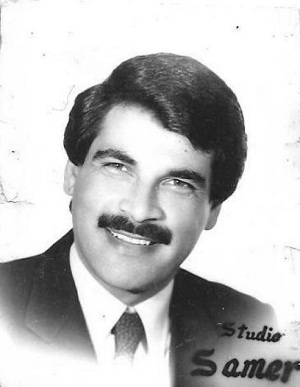

Deputy Minister of Defense
- In office September 2011 – 18 July 2012
- President: Bashar al-Assad
- Minister: Dawoud Rajiha

Deputy Chief of Staff of the Syrian Armed Forces
- In office 2009–2011

Head of Military Intelligence Directorate
- In office 2005–2009
- Preceded by: Hassan Khalil
- Succeeded by: Abdel-Fatah Qudsiyeh

Personal details
- Born: 15 January 1950 Al-Madehleh, Tartus, Syria
- Died: 18 July 2012 (aged 62) Damascus, Syria
- Cause of death: Assassination
- Party: Ba'ath Party
- Spouse: Bushra al-Assad (m. 1995)
- Children: 5
- Relatives: Hafez al-Assad (father-in-law); Bassel (brother-in-law); Bashar (brother-in-law); Majd (brother-in-law); Maher (brother-in-law)

Military service
- Allegiance: Ba'athist Syria
- Branch/service: Syrian Arab Army; Defense Companies
- Years of service: 1970s–2012
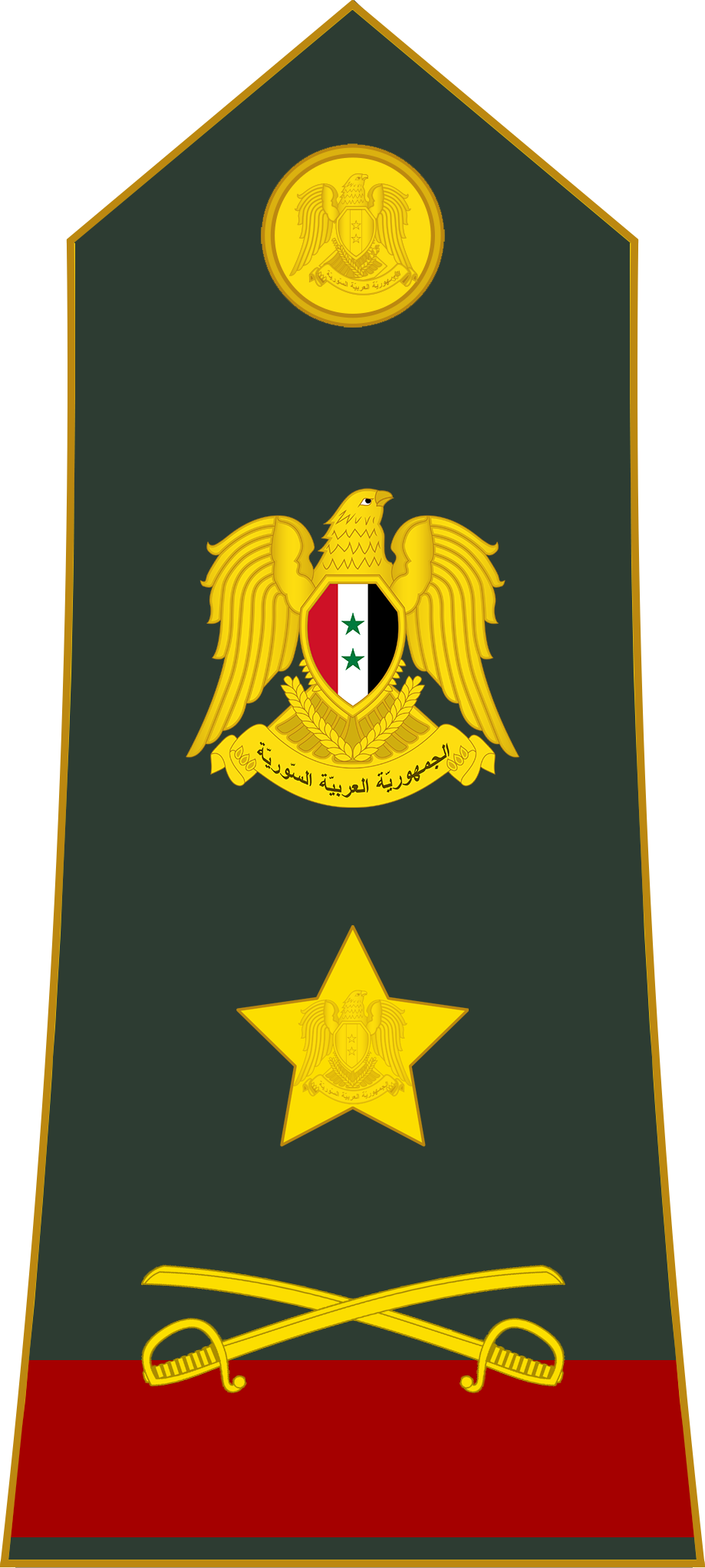
- Rank: Lieutenant general
- Conflicts: Yom Kippur War; Lebanese Civil War; Syrian intervention; 1982 Lebanon War; Islamist uprising in Syria; Syrian Civil War

Assef Shawkat (Arabic: آصف شوكت, romanized: ʾĀṣif Šawkat; 15 January 1950 – 18 July 2012) was a Syrian military officer and intelligence chief who was the Deputy Minister of Defense of Syria from September 2011 until his death in July 2012. He was the brother-in-law of former Syrian President Bashar al-Assad, having married his older sister Bushra.

He and three other top Syrian government officials were killed on 18 July 2012 in Damascus during a deadly bomb attack allegedly organized by the Free Syrian Army, a coalition of Syrian opposition rebel groups. Shawkat was a key suspect in a terrorist attack in Beirut that killed Lebanese Prime Minister Rafic Hariri on 14 February 2005. US Department of Treasury had sanctioned Shawkat in 2006 for orchestrating the assassination, describing him as "a key architect" of the Syrian occupation of Lebanon.

== Early life and education ==
Assef Shawkat was born into a Alawite family in the village of Al-Madehleh, a predominantly Alawite village, in the Tartus Governorate of Syria on 15 January 1950. He grew up in modest comfort and studied law and history at Damascus University before joining the Syrian Army in the early 1970s. During this time, Shawkat married and had five children.

== Military career ==
After joining the army, Shawkat began working his way up through the ranks, and by 1982 he was an officer in the Defense Companies paramilitary force headed by Rifaat al-Assad, the brother of Syrian President Hafez al-Assad. The Defense Companies were responsible for putting down an Islamist uprising in the city of Hama in 1982.

In 1983, after Hafez al-Assad suffered an apparent heart attack, he named governing council of six men he believed were unlikely to seize power to run the country in his absence. Rifaat al-Assad was not among them. Hafez al-Assad's prolonged absence caused supporters of Rifaat al-Assad to rally around him, and in 1984 Rifaat launched a bid to take control of Damascus which nearly escalated into a civil war. The tensions only eased when Hafez al-Assad, still ill, addressed the nation and the attempted coup d'état collapsed. Shawkat remained loyal to Hafez al-Assad throughout this period, and he was rewarded with a promotion to colonel.

== Marriage to Bushra al-Assad ==
In the early 1980s, Shawkat met Bushra al-Assad, who was at that time studying pharmacy at Damascus University. Bushra was the first child and only daughter of Hafez al-Assad, and she had a close relationship with her father. Bushra's father and her younger brother Bassel al-Assad were strongly opposed to Bushra's relationship with Shawkat, who was ten years her senior and a divorced father of five from a modest background. Bassel briefly had Shawkat jailed in 1993 to block their relationship. However, there is another report stating that the reason for his imprisonment was related to his wrongdoing.

However, in January 1994, Bassel died in a car crash, and a year later, in 1995 Shawkat and Bushra al-Assad eloped. Despite failing to obtain her father's blessing prior to the marriage, Hafez al-Assad accepted Shawkat into the family, and Shawkat was soon promoted in rank to Major-General. Assef and Bushra had five children, all named for immediate members of Bushra's family: Bushra, Anisa, Bassel, Naya and Hafez.

After his marriage to Bushra al-Assad, Shawkat built a close relationship with her brother Bashar, who had recently been recalled from London after his brother Bassel's death to be groomed as his father's successor. Bushra reportedly nurtured this relationship. On the other hand, he is said to have had a fractious relationship with Bushra's and Bashar's younger brother Maher al-Assad, who is alleged to have shot him in the stomach in 1999.

== Political career ==
By the time Bashar al-Assad became President of Syria in June 2000 after the death of his father, Hafez al-Assad, Shawkat was widely considered one of the most powerful people in Syria. In 2001, Shawkat was named Deputy Director of Military Intelligence, one of the main branches of the Syrian intelligence apparatus. His portfolio included liaising with militant Palestinian groups, such as Hamas and Islamic Jihad, and he was a key architect of Syria's dominance of Lebanon. After the 11 September 2001 attacks, Shawkat was a primary contact with intelligence agencies in the United States and Europe and coordinated a US intelligence operation in Syria, which was shut down after relations between the two countries irremediably deteriorated.

=== Implication in Rafik Hariri assassination ===
In February 2005, Shawkat was promoted to Director of Military Intelligence, replacing Hassan Khalil. Shortly before his promotion, former Lebanese Prime Minister Rafik Hariri was assassinated by a car bomb in Beirut on 14 February 2005. The size and sophistication of the device used in the blast was considered to have involved a state intelligence agency, and United Nations investigators implicated Shawkat in the plot. immed In 2006, Shawkat was named a Specially Designated National (SDN) by the US, allowing his assets to be frozen in the US.

He was also implicated in the assassination of Imad Mughniyah in Damascus on 12 February 2008. He was subsequently administratively detained, and in July 2009, he was dismissed as head of military intelligence, 'thus ridding the regime of the key suspect in the international investigation into Hariri's assassination', given the rank of general and named as deputy chief of staff of the armed forces.

He held this post until September 2011, when he was appointed deputy defense minister, ostensibly under General Dawoud Rajiha. After the appointment of General Dawoud Rajiha to head the ministry of defense, Shawkat became an important figure in the ministry of defense, though the army was under the de facto control of Maher al-Assad, the president's brother. However, Shawkat had more than one conflict with Maher al-Assad.

== Syrian uprising ==
Together with President Bashar al-Assad and his brother Maher al-Assad, Shawkat was a principal architect of the crackdown that followed in response to the Syrian uprising that began in March 2011. He was a member of a military crisis unit created by President al-Assad, which included Defense Minister Dawoud Rajiha, intelligence chief Hisham Bekhityar, special security advisor Ali Mamlouk, head of military intelligence Abdel-Fatah Qudsiyeh, and Mohammed Nasif Kheirbek, a veteran operator from the era of Assad's father.

In May 2012, the Free Syrian Army's (FSA) Damascus council claimed that one of their operatives from its Al Sahabeh battalion had poisoned the eight members of Bashar Assad's military crisis unit, including Assef Shawkat, who was inaccurately reported to have died.

== Assassination ==
On 18 July 2012, Shawkat attended a meeting of the Central Crisis Management Cell (CCMC) at the headquarters of Syria's national security council in the Rawda Square of Damascus. There he was killed in a bomb attack along with Dawoud Rajiha, the defense minister, and Hassan Turkmani, the former defense minister and a military adviser to Vice President Farouk al-Sharaa. As'ad AbuKhalil, a California State University professor, argues that Shawkat was the key man in the group assassinated.

Syrian state television reported that an honorific state funeral ceremony was held for him, Turkmani, and Rajha at the Tomb of the Unknown Soldier in Damascus on 20 July 2012. Bashar al-Assad and his brother Maher al-Assad did not attend the ceremony. Bashar al-Assad was represented by Vice President Farouk al-Sharaa in the ceremony. Shawkat was buried in the Tartus region following a funeral attended by his wife Bushra al-Assad and his mother-in-law, Anissa al-Assad, the widow of Hafez al-Assad.

Iraqi President Jalal Talabani sent his condolences to Bashar al-Assad upon death of Assef Shawkat.

== See also ==
- Assad family
