= Mohammad al-Shaar =

Syrian politician and military officer

His Excellency Mohammad al-Shaar
- محمد الشعار

Vice President of the National Progressive Front
- In office 26 November 2018 – 11 December 2024
- President: Bashar al-Assad

Minister of the Interior
- In office 14 April 2011 – 26 November 2018
- President: Bashar al-Assad
- Prime Minister: Adel Safar; Riyad Farid Hijab; Wael Nader al-Halqi; Imad Khamis
- Preceded by: Said Mohammad Sammour
- Succeeded by: Mohammad Khaled al-Rahmoun

Commander of the Syrian Military Police
- In office ? – 14 April 2011
- President: Bashar al-Assad
- Succeeded by: Abdulaziz al-Shalal

Personal details
- Born: 1950 (age 75–76) Al-Haffa, Latakia Governorate, Syria
- Party: Ba'ath Party
- Other political affiliations: National Progressive Front
- Children: 5

Military service
- Allegiance: Ba'athist Syria
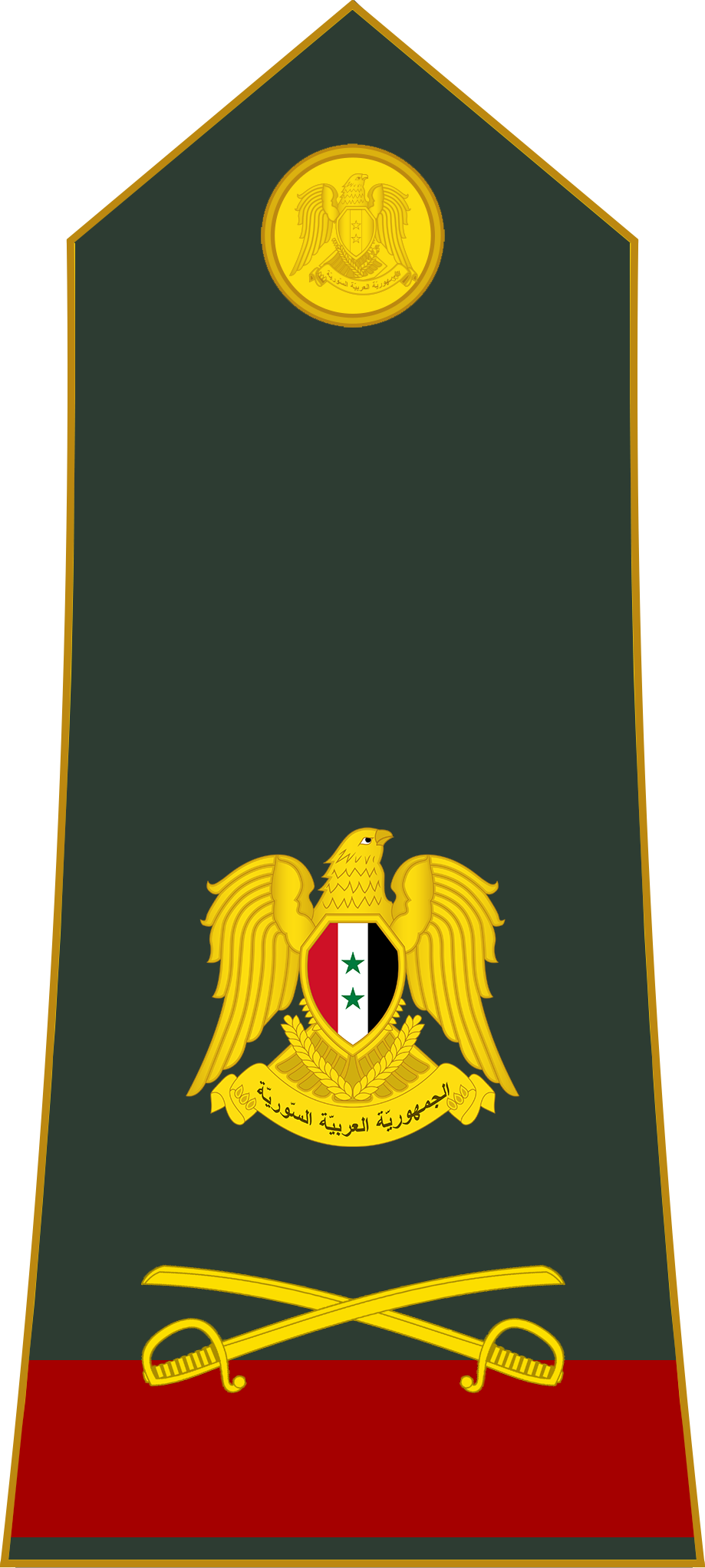
- Rank: Major General
- Battles/wars: Syrian Civil War

Mohammad Ibrahim al-Shaar (Arabic: محمد إبراهيم الشعار; born 1950) is a Syrian military officer who served as Minister of the Interior from 2011 to 2018. He also served as the vice president of the National Progressive Front.

== Early life ==
Shaar was born into a Sunni family in the village of Hafa in Latakia Governorate in 1950.

== Career ==
Shaar joined the armed forces in 1971 and held a number of security positions, including chief of the military security in Tartous, the chief of the military security in Aleppo, and the commander and chief of the Syrian military police. He was the commander of the military police prior to being appointed minister of interior in April 2011, replacing Said Mohammad Sammour.

== Sanctions ==
On 9 May 2011, the European Union (EU) placed sanctions on Shaar along with 12 others. The Official Journal of the European Union states the reason for sanctions against him as "involvement in violent treatment of demonstrators". The Swiss government had also put him into their sanction list in September 2011, citing the same reason given by the EU.

== Personal life ==
Shaar is married and has two sons and three daughters. He is a Sunni Muslim.

== Reports of death or injury ==
On 18 July 2012, there were conflicting reports on his fate, with CNN reporting that Syrian state run television confirmed that Shaar was killed following a bombing of a meeting of the Central Crisis Management Cell (CCMC) at the National Security headquarters in Damascus. However, later state TV reported that he survived although wounded. Additional reports stated that he, along with the country's intelligence chief, was in stable condition.

On 19 December 2012, reports surfaced that Shaar had been admitted to the American University in Beirut hospital in Lebanon a few days earlier, after sustaining unspecified injuries in a bombing. The attack took place in front of the ministry of interior in Damascus on 12 December, killing several and injuring more than 20. Shaar's injuries were not believed to be serious.

On 26 December 2012, Shaar was reported to have cut his treatment short in Beirut due to a belief that he might be arrested by Lebanese officials for his role in a massacre of hundreds of people in Tripoli in 1986 and that he may be subject to international arrest warrants. He then returned to Damascus.

== Surrender ==
Following the fall of the Assad regime, al-Shaar voluntarily surrendered himself to the new authorities on 4 February 2025.

== See also ==
- Cabinet of Syria

Political offices
Preceded by Said Mohammad Sammour	Interior Minister; 14 April 2011 – 26 November 2018	Succeeded by Mohammad Khaled al-Rahmoun
