= Central Crisis Management Cell (Syria) =

Security committee at the top of Syrian government security chain of command

The Central Crisis Management Cell (CCMC) (Arabic: خلية إدارة الأزمة السورية), also known as the Syrian Crisis Cell, was a secret security committee established by the Syrian government in March 2011 to coordinate the response to civilian protest and internal dissent. It was headed by Syrian President Bashar al-Assad, and its members included the heads of the National Security Office, Military Intelligence Directorate, Air Force Intelligence Directorate, Political Security Directorate, and General Intelligence Directorate, as well as the Ministers of Interior and Defense.

The CCMC met regularly in an office on the first floor of the Baath Party's Regional Command in central Damascus. It focused on identifying opposition figures and taking the necessary steps to crush dissent. CCMC members agreed on a plan at the end of each meeting, and minutes were sent via courier to Bashar al-Assad at the presidential palace, who approved and signed proposals, then returned them to the CCMC for implementation.

== Members ==
The CCMC is headed by Syrian President Bashar al-Assad and comprises the following members

- Maher al-Assad, head of the Presidential Guard and the Fourth Armored Division
- Minister of Defense
- Minister of Interior
- Head of National Security Office
- Head of Military Intelligence Directorate
- Head of Air Force Intelligence Directorate
- Head of Political Security Directorate
- Head of General Intelligence Directorate

== Bombing attack ==
On 18 July 2012, a meeting of the CCMC at the National Security headquarters in Damascus was subject to a bombing attack that led to the deaths of the Syrian Defense Minister Dawoud Rajiha, Deputy Defense Minister Assef Shawkat, and the assistant to the vice president General Hasan Turkmani.

== Meeting minute leaks ==
In 2012, Abdulhalim Barakat, a secret member of the Syrian government opposition employed by the CCMC to process confidential security memos, leaked detailed minutes from CCMC meetings to Al Jazeera.
