= Rawda Square =

Square in Damascus, Syria

Coordinates: 33°31′16.09″N 36°16′58.15″E

Al-Rawda Square (Arabic: ساحة الروضة / ALA-LC: sāḥat ar-Rawḍah) is a square in north-west Damascus. The square is the location of the National Security Building, where the Defence Minister as well as President Bashar al-Assad’s brother-in-law were assassinated on July 18, 2012 during the Syrian civil war.
