= Foreign involvement in the Syrian civil war =

Map of states with military/paramilitary forces deployed in Syria until the fall of the Assad regime on 8 December 2024. Syria States supporting the Syrian government with troops in Syria States with a militia supporting the Syrian government in Syria States supporting Syrian rebels or a non-government faction with troops in Syria

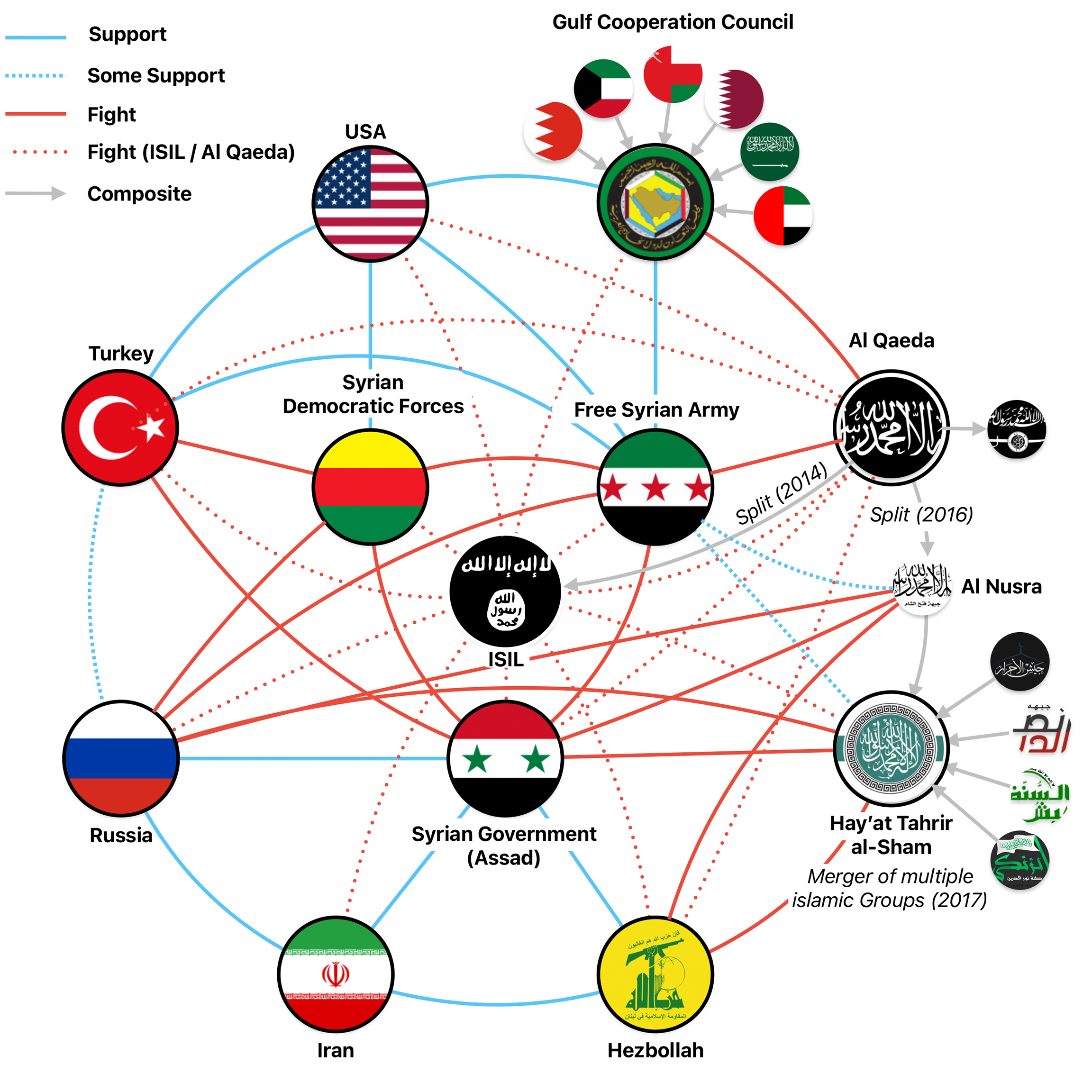
Local, regional and international actors involved in the Syrian civil war.

Most factions in the Syrian civil war received support from countries, groups, and entities based outside of Syria. As a result of such interventions, the war in Syria became a series of overlapping proxy conflicts, including between Russia vs the US, Iran vs Saudi Arabia, Iran vs Israel, Israel vs Turkey, and Russia vs Turkey. The war led to spillover fighting in countries including Lebanon, Iraq, and Libya. The final years of the war also served as a part of the Middle Eastern crisis.

The Syrian government was supported by Russia and Iran: both intervened militarily. Iranian proxies including the Lebanese paramilitary group Hezbollah as well as Palestinian and Iraqi militias provided additional military presence. Iraq intervened to support Assad, mostly fighting the Islamic State.

Russia became embroiled in clashes and diplomatic incidents with Turkish, American, and Israeli forces, while Iran engaged in direct conflict with Israel. Egypt supported Assad.

The various factions that made up the Syrian opposition had wider international support, receiving financial, political and military aid from Middle Eastern powers (Turkey, Saudi Arabia, Qatar, the UAE, Jordan, Israel) and Western countries (US, United Kingdom, France, Germany, Netherlands). Beginning in 2016, Turkey began a series of cross-border operations to support the Syrian National Army. The US, UK, and France supported the Revolutionary Commando Army, with troops stationed in Al-Tanf while also attacking the Syrian government. Support for the Syrian opposition waned following 2017 as a result of increasing internal divisions and the defeat of the Islamic State. Turkey was the main supporter of the opposition, sponsoring the campaign that led to the fall of the Assad regime; Ukraine supported the opposition due to the Russo–Ukrainian war. Israel attacked Iranian and Syrian government forces throughout the war, while repeatedly denying supporting the opposition.

The Syrian Democratic Forces (SDF) of Rojava mainly received military and financial support from the American-led coalition fighting the Islamic State. The SDF received military support from Kurdish militant groups based in Kurdistan, as well as by left-wing foreign fighters. From 2015 onward, Turkey began to attack the SDF as a result of the Kurdish–Turkish conflict, leading to the Turkish occupation of northern Syria and for Iran and Russia to provide limited support to the SDF in order to prevent opposition territorial gains. Israel offered diplomatic support to Rojava in an effort to counter Iranian influence. The US remained the SDF's foremost sponsor.

== Support for the Assad government ==
=== Russia ===
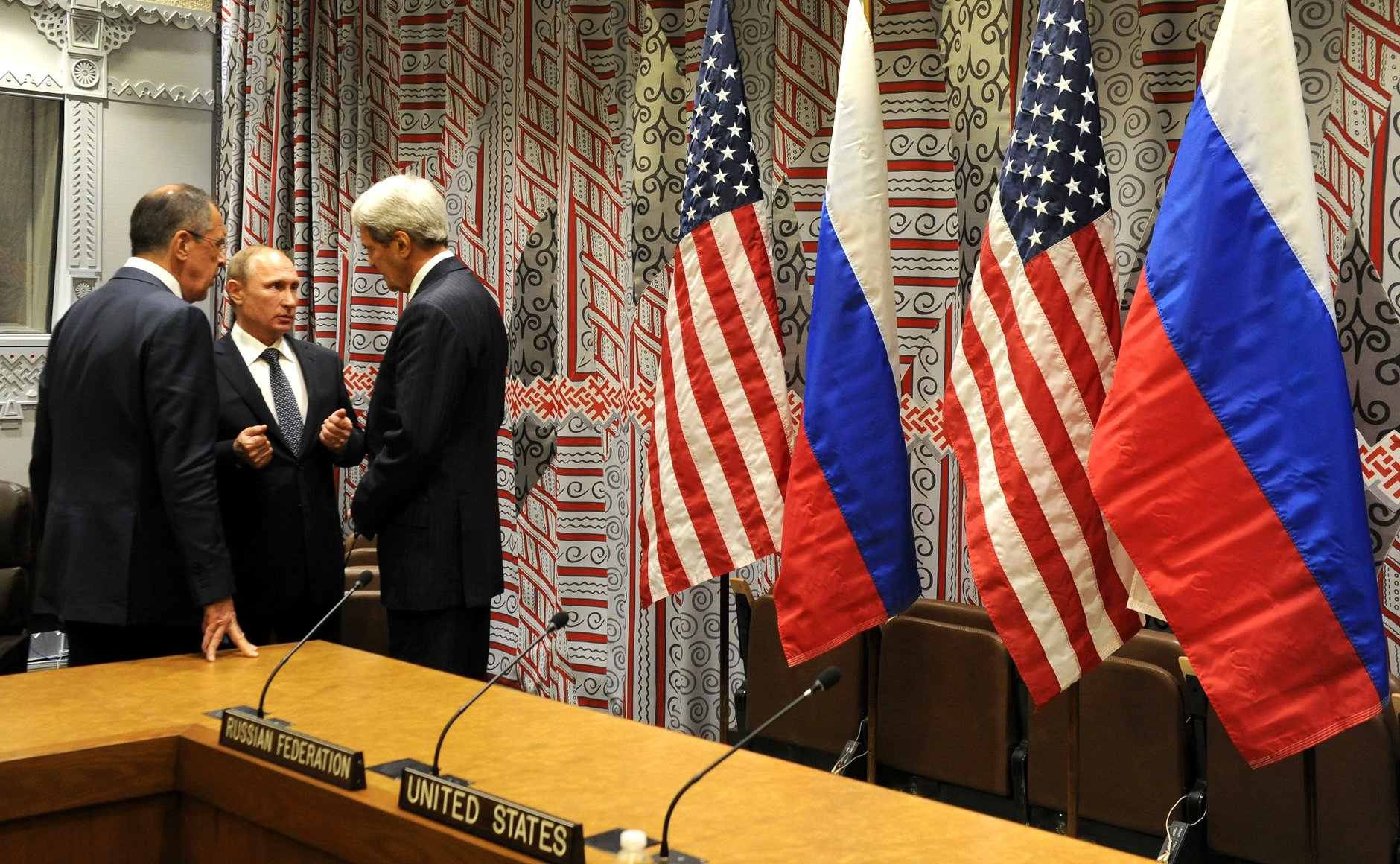
Russian (Lavrov, Putin) and US (Kerry) representatives meet, in the United Nations headquarters in New York, to discuss the situation, 29 September 2015

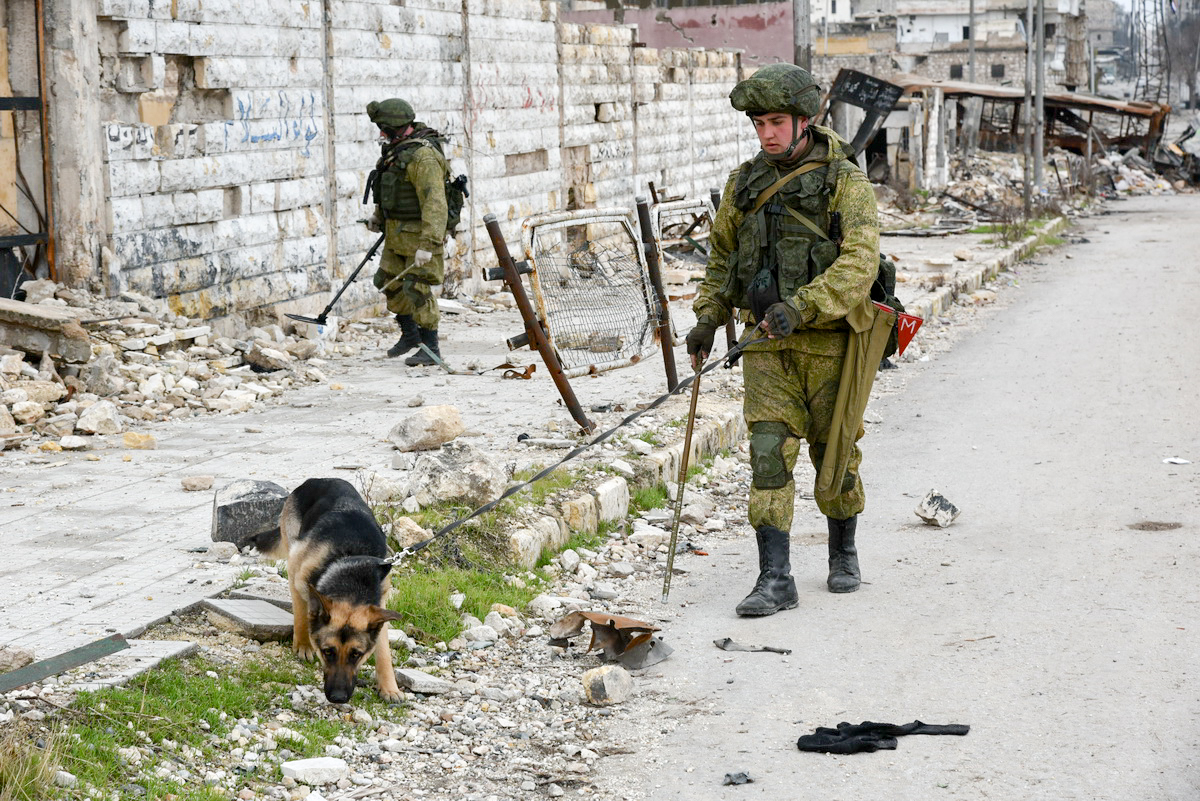
Russian sappers in Aleppo, December 2016

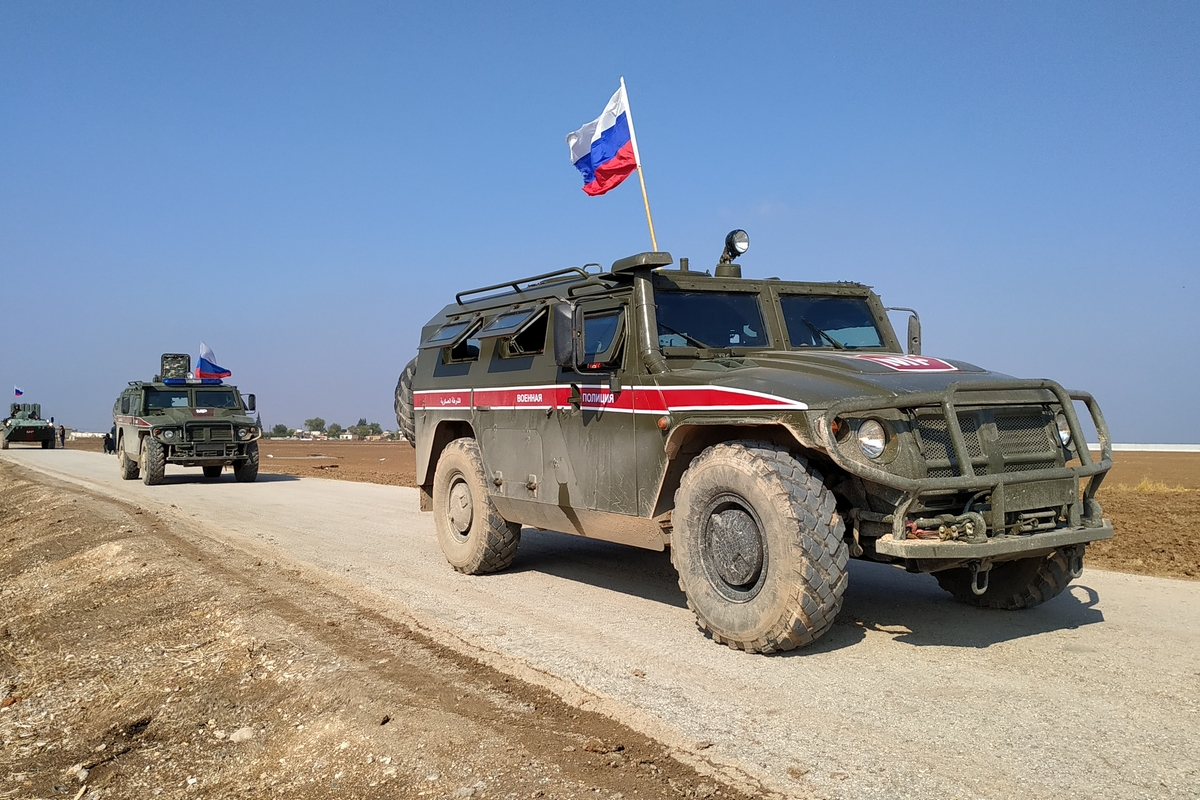
Russian Military Police in Kobanî, October 2019

Russia became a military ally of Syria in 1956, and continued supplying Syria's government with arms, sending military and technical advisers to train Syrian soldiers, and helping to repair and maintain weapons. Investigations suggest that Russia transported hundreds of tonnes of banknotes into the country.

In December 2012, it was reported that Russian military personnel were inside Syria, manning anti-aircraft systems. The depth and sophistication of Syria's air defences was cited as a reason for the US not to intervene militarily or impose a no-fly zone, despite President Obama's commitment to do so if the Assad government crossed the "red line" of using chemical weapons.

Western leaders repeatedly criticized Russia's support of the Syrian government; Russia claimed that its actions had not violated international law. In June 2012, Russian president Vladimir Putin said Russia did not support "any side" in the conflict.

In December 2013, Russia was reported to have supplied armored vehicles, surveillance equipment, radars, electronic warfare systems, spare parts, and weapons such as guided bombs.

On 30 September 2015, Russia conducted air strikes against ISIS, the Al-Nusra Front, and other perceived enemies. The Russian Orthodox Church official spokesman called the intervention a "holy fight" (or holy struggle) against terrorism. Russia claimed the attacks were against ISIL. However, Russian air strikes also targeted positions held by the Army of Conquest coalition, including Saudi/Turkish-backed Al-Nusra Front and by ash-Sham.

In autumn 2015, the US ruled out military cooperation with Russia. On 20 October 2015, the US and Russia signed a secret technical memorandum of understanding to avoid air incidents.

On 22 November 2015, Assad said that with two months of air strikes, Russia had achieved more than the US-led coalition had achieved in a year. Two days later, Obama said, "Russia right now is a coalition of two, Iran and Russia, supporting Assad. Given Russia’s military capabilities and given the influence they have on the Assad regime, them cooperating would be enormously helpful in bringing about a resolution of the civil war, and allow us all to refocus our attention on ISIL."

As of Summer 2023, Russia had 20 military bases in Syria as well as 85 other military outposts, the majority in Hama, Al-Hasakah, Latakia and Aleppo. The main bases were Hmeimim Air Base in Latakia, designed for vertical take-off and landing operations, and used for military operations since 2015. Tartus Naval Base was Russia's only Mediterranean naval base. In March 2023, Assad told Russian media that "increasing the number of Russian military bases in Syrian territory might be necessary in the future because Russia's presence is linked to the global balance of power."

In January 2025, the Syrian caretaker government ended the treaty allowing Russian military presence in Syria, including a contract with Russian company Stroytransgaz to manage the commercial areas of the Tartus port. In February, Syrian defence minister Murhaf Abu Qasra stated that Russia would be allowed to maintain the base "if we get benefits for Syria out of this". By October, Russia was using the port for resupplying its airbase while negotiations over its fate continued.

=== Iran ===
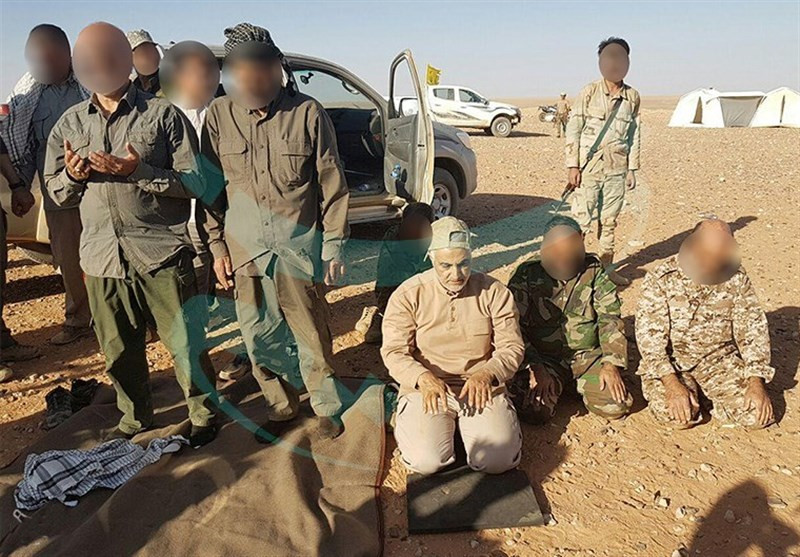
Iranian Major General Qasem Soleimani praying alongside Liwa Fatemiyoun militiamen in the Syrian Desert in 2017

Iran and Syria were strategic allies. Iran provided significant support. This included technical support, combat troops, and $9bn. Iran viewed the civil war as a critical front in an existential battle that directly affected its geopolitical security. Iran's supreme leader, Ali Khamenei, was reported in September 2011 to vocally support the Syrian government. Zabadani was important to Assad and to Iran because, as late as June 2011, the city served as the Islamic Revolutionary Guard Corps's (IRGC) logistical hub for supplying Hezbollah.

In the civil uprising phase of the war, Iran provided Syria with technical support. As the uprising expanded, reports of Iranian military support increased, partly in response to reports of increasing opposition support from Persian Gulf states. On 30 January 2013, ~10 jets bombed a convoy believed to be carrying Russian-made SA-17 anti-aircraft missiles to Lebanon. The attack, attributed by media reports to the Israeli Air Force, did not result in counterattacks from Syria, who reserved the right to retaliate. Western intelligence sources reported that Iranian general Hassan Shateri was killed in the airstrike. Iran acknowledged his death without details. Israel did not comment on its involvement.

In autumn 2015, Iran signed the road map based on the 2012 Geneva Communique that was worked out during two rounds of talks in Vienna. After a meeting between Vladimir Putin and Ali Khamenei in Tehran on 23 November 2015, Iran was said to have decided to match Russia's stance vis-a-vis the Syrian leadership.

In 2024, Iran maintained 55 military bases in Syria and 515 other military points, the majority in Aleppo and Deir Ezzor and the Damascus suburbs; these comprised 70% of the foreign military sites in the country.

=== Hezbollah ===
Hezbollah was a longtime ally of the Ba'ath Party and helped the Syrian government fight the opposition. As early as November 2011, protesters burnt Hezbollah flags and images of its leader Hassan Nasrallah, while pro-government protesters carried posters of him.

In August 2012, the US sanctioned Hezbollah for its alleged role in the war. Nasralla denied fighting on behalf of the government, stating in a 12 October 2012 speech that "right from the start the Syrian opposition has been telling the media that Hezbollah sent 3,000 fighters to Syria, which we have denied". However, he said that Hezbollah fighters had gone to Syria independently and died there doing their "jihadist duties". Hezbollah stated it supports a reform process and is against what it called US plots.

In January–February 2012, Hezbollah fighters were reported to have helped the government fight in Damascus and in the Battle of Zabadani. Later that year, Hezbollah fighters took over eight villages in the Al-Qusayr District. Nasrallah said that Hezbollah fighters helped the government maintain control of ~23 Lebanese Shiite villages. In September 2012, Hezbollah's commander in Syria, Ali Hussein Nassif, was killed along with other Hezbollah militants in an ambush by the Free Syrian Army (FSA ) near Al-Qusayr.

According to the US, the Assad loyalist militia known as Jaysh al-Sha'bi was created and maintained by Hezbollah and IRGC, providing money, weapons, training and advice. Also, according to Israeli intelligence sources, Hezbollah worked to forge loyalist militias into a 100,000-strong irregular army.

Hezbollah was involved in the Siege of Homs (2011–14), the Battle of Zabadani (2012), the Battle of al-Qusayr (2012) and the Battle of Aleppo (2011–16). On 16–17 February 2013, Syrian opposition groups claimed that Hezbollah/Syrian military forces attacked three FSA -controlled Sunni villages in Al-Qusayr. An FSA spokesman said, "Hezbollah's invasion is the first of its kind in terms of organisation, planning and coordination with the Syrian regime's air force". Hezbollah said three Lebanese Shias, "acting in self-defense", were killed in the clashes. Lebanese security sources said that the three were Hezbollah members. In response, FSA attacked two Hezbollah positions on 21 February; one in Syria and one in Lebanon. Five days later, it said it destroyed a convoy of Hezbollah fighters and Syrian officers traveling to Lebanon, killing all the passengers. The leaders of the March 14 alliance and other prominent Lebanese figures called on Hezbollah to lend its involvement. Subhi al-Tufayli, Hezbollah's former leader, said "Hezbollah should not be defending the criminal regime that kills its own people and that has never fired a shot in defense of the Palestinians". The Consultative Gathering, a group of Shia and Sunni leaders in Baalbek-Hermel called on Hezbollah not to "interfere". Walid Jumblatt, leader of the Progressive Socialist Party, called on Hezbollah to end its involvement.

Hezbollah was involved in the Al-Qusayr offensive (mid-2013) and the Battle of Qalamoun (late 2013).

In February 2015, Israeli research centre Jerusalem Center for Public Affairs published what it said was an Israeli intelligence assessment document that referenced a document allegedly produced by FSA 's United Al-Sham Front and purportedly exposed ″the military and terrorist infrastructure that the Iranian Revolutionary Guard Corps and Hizbullah have built on the Syrian Golan, which, according to the IDF’s intelligence branch, is also directed at Israel".

In the 2015-18 period, Hezbollah was involved in the Daraa Governorate campaign, the Battle of Zabadani (2015), Aleppo offensive (October–December 2015), Northern Aleppo offensive (2016), Wadi Barada offensive (2016–17), Aleppo offensive (June–August 2016), Daraa offensive (June 2017), Qalamoun offensive (July–August 2017), 2017 Abu Kamal offensive, Central Syria campaign (2017), the Beit Jinn offensive (2017–18), and the East Hama offensive (2017).

In September 2017, a Hezbollah commander said the group had 10,000 fighters in southern Syria ready to confront Israel.

=== Iraq ===
Iraq sent Assad financial support beginning in 2011. It opened its airspace to Iranian planes ferrying support to the Syrian government, and granted passage to trucks bound for Syria carrying supplies from IRGC. The Iraqi government signed a deal to provide Syria with diesel fuel. Iraq repeatedly struck ISIL in Deir ez-Zor. In December 2018, the Syrian government officially gave Iraq permission to strike ISIL inside Syrian territory without permission.

=== Egypt ===
Following the ouster of Mohamed Morsi in 2013, Egypt expressed support for Assad, and President Abdel Fattah el-Sisi expressed support for Assad against ISIL. However, on June 30, 2020, Egypt deployed 150 troops to Idlib. Egypt had been discussing this possibility since 2018.

=== Business ===
Greece-based trading company Naftomar was reputedly the last firm to arrange deliveries of liquefied petroleum gas (LPG), but, unlike fuel sent from Venezuela and Russia, LPG is vital in countries such as Syria that have limited infrastructure for piping gas. International sanctions do not apply to LPG for humanitarian reasons.

The release of WikiLeaks' "Syria Files" beginning in July 2012 led to accusations that a subsidiary of an Italian arms company had provided communications equipment to the Syrian military in May 2011, and that, as late as February 2012, its engineers gave training on the use of the technology, including helicopter installation. The company said the equipment was for civilian use and that it had not sold technology to Syria since the beginning of the uprising.

In 2013, the UK government revealed that from 2004 to 2010, British companies sold sodium fluoride, which has many civil applications, such as water fluoridation, but is also a key ingredient in the manufacture of sarin, to a Syrian firm. Between July 2004 and May 2010, the British government issued export licenses to two companies, ending in May 2010. The licenses were obtained prior to manufacture and the industry standard required four to five months before the chemicals were delivered, thus allowing them to sell Syria sodium fluoride. In 2014, the UK government said that these chemicals had probably been used to manufacture chemical weapons.

== Support for Syrian opposition ==
=== US ===
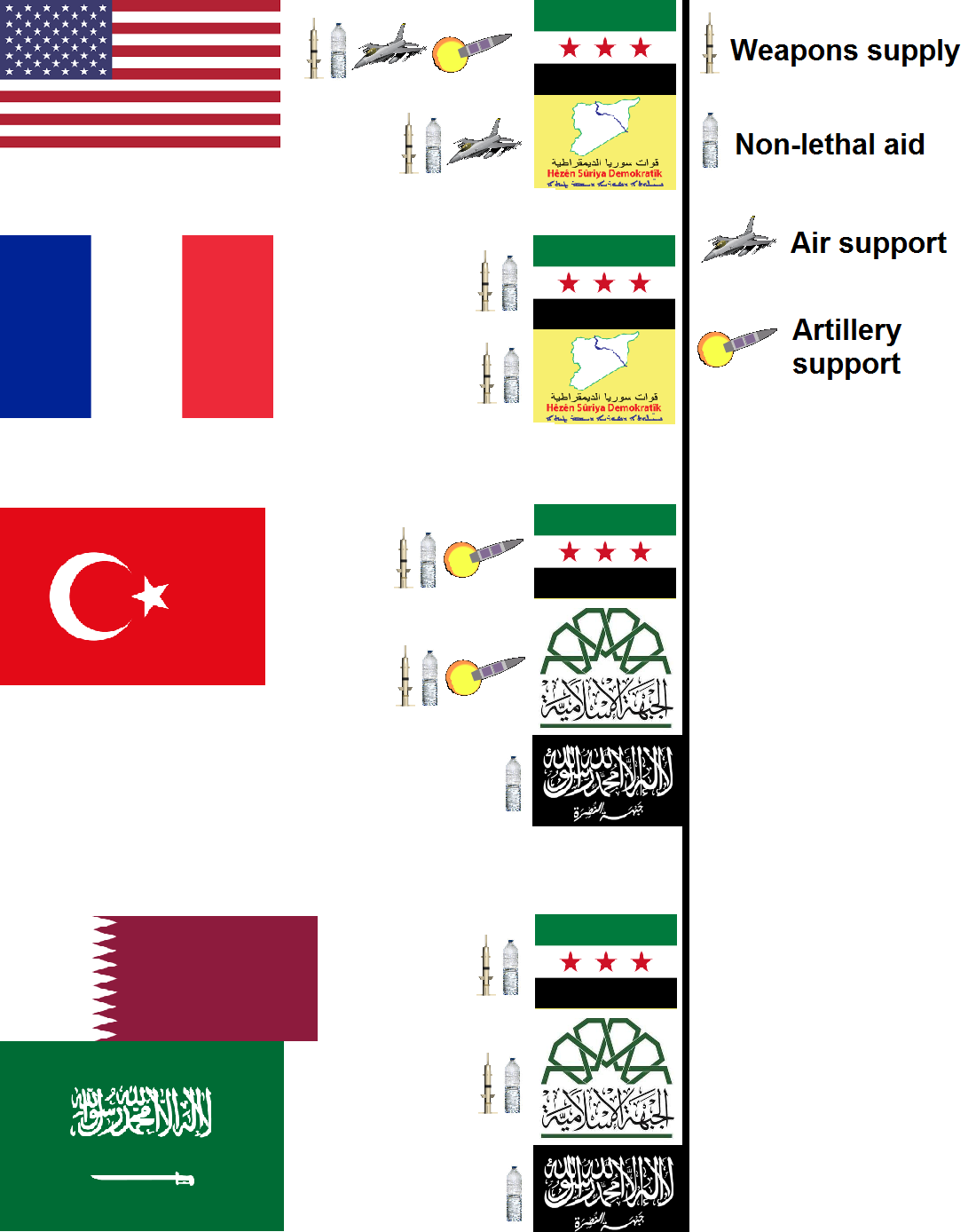
Main countries that support the Syrian opposition

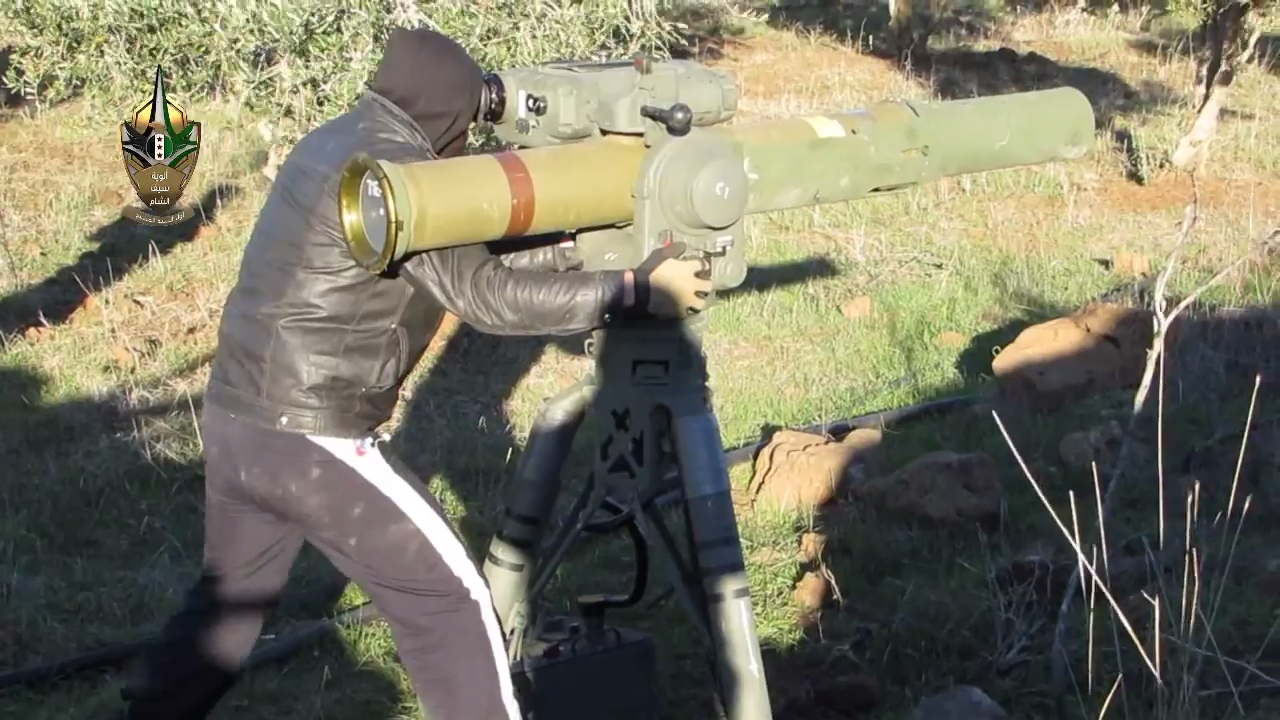
Sword of al-Sham Brigades fighter operating the American anti-tank missile BGM-71 TOW

For several initial months of the Syrian uprising that began in March 2011, the US, despite pressure, refrained from outright calls for Assad′s ouster, a move then opposed by key US allies such as Turkey and Saudi Arabia. Limited sanctions against Assad came in April 2011, followed by Obama′s executive order on 18 May specifically targeting Assad and six other senior officials. In July, US Secretary of State Hillary Clinton said president Assad had “lost legitimacy". On 18 August, Barack Obama issued a written statement echoed by the leaders of the UK, France, and Germany, that inter alia said: “The future of Syria must be determined by its people, but President Bashar al-Assad is standing in their way. His calls for dialogue and reform have rung hollow while he is imprisoning, torturing, and slaughtering his own people....the time has come for President Assad to step aside." On the same day Obama signed executive orders that froze all Syrian government assets under US jurisdiction; barred Americans from doing business with the government, and prohibited the import of Syrian oil and petroleum products. The US sanctions were called by Syria’s U.N. ambassador Bashar Jaafari "a humanitarian and diplomatic war against us". The State Department was in charge of supplying nonlethal aid (including food and trucks, but not tanks or bullets), while the Central Intelligence Agency (CIA) ran a covert program to arm and train rebels.

In June 2012, the CIA was reported to be involved in covert operations along the Turkish-Syrian border, where agents investigated rebel groups, recommending groups for arms providers to aid. Agents helped opposition forces develop supply routes, and provided them with communications training. CIA operatives distributed assault rifles, anti-tank rocket launchers and other ammunition to the opposition. The State Department had reportedly allocated $15 million for civilian opposition groups. In July 2012, the US granted Syrian Support Group a license to fund FSA . In 2016, US officials revealed that the CIA in 2012 proposed a covert action plan designed to remove Assad from power, but Obama did not approve it.

In early March 2013, a Jordanian source revealed that the US, Britain, and France were training non-Islamist rebels in Jordan in an effort to strengthen secular elements against Islamic extremism, and to begin building security forces to maintain order if Assad fell. In April 2013, also in Jordan, the US set up a $70 million program that was "training the kingdom's special forces to identify and secure chemical-weapons sites across Syria should the regime fall and the wrong rebels look like getting their hands on them."

In April, Obama promised to double non-lethal aid to rebels, to $250 million. On 13 June, US officials said it had approved providing lethal arms to the Supreme Military Council (SMC). The decision was made shortly after the administration concluded that the Assad government had used chemical weapons on opposition forces. The arms included small arms and ammunition, and possibly anti-tank weapons, but not anti-aircraft weapons, something repeatedly requested by the opposition. Such weapons would be supplied by the US "on our own timeline". In mid-June, the US said it would arm rebels and consider establishing a no-fly zone on Syria′s southern border.

The US reaction to the use of chemical agents in Ghouta on 21 August, which was formally attributed by Obama to the Syrian government, prompted the media to report that "the US was on the verge of military strikes against the Assad regime". Nevertheless, the US opted not to strike.

During September, US officials reported that small arms and anti-tank weapons had begun reaching moderate rebel groups. Although FSA Commander Salim Idris denied receiving lethal aid, some analysts commented that information on US arms may not have reached Idris due to poor communications as FSA command was based in Northern Syria whilst weapons were reportedly reaching rebel groups in the south.

In late 2013, Islamist groups left SMC to form the Saudi-backed Islamic Front, which fought SMC brigades. In December, the US temporarily suspended shipments of non-lethal military aid after warehouses were seized by Islamic Front.

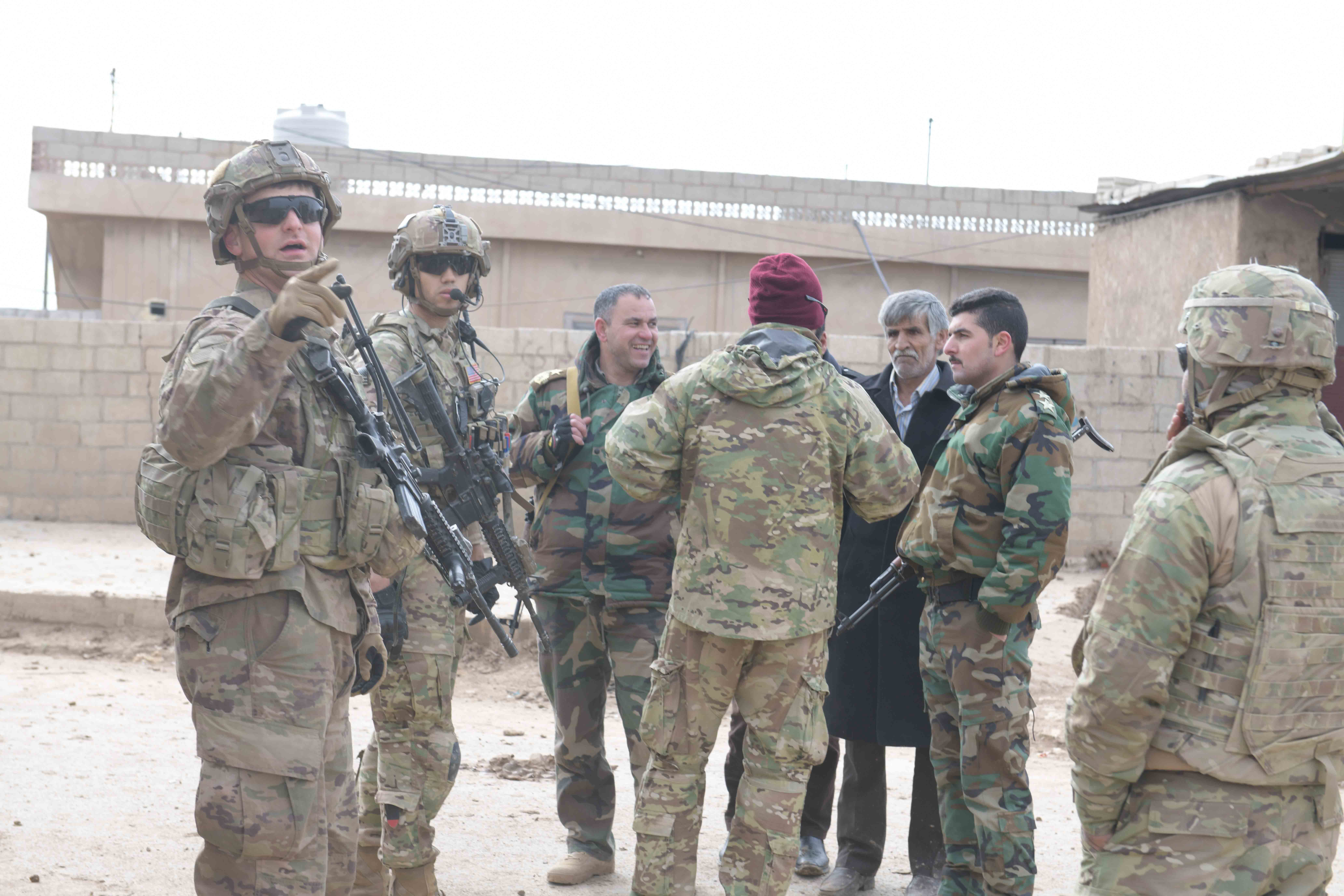
US soldiers converse with pro-Assad militiamen near Qamishli, 12 February 2020

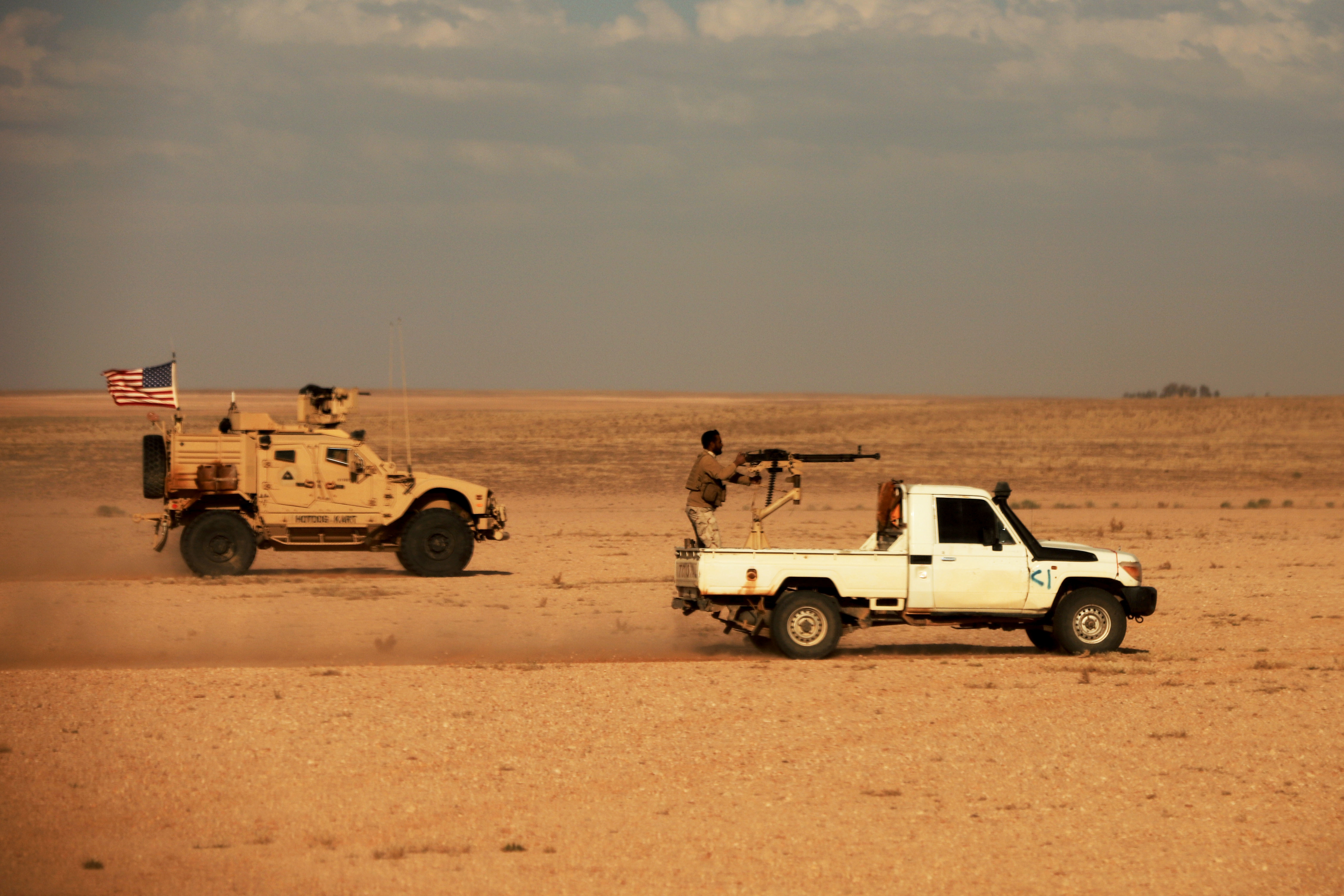
US Green Berets and Revolutionary Commando Army rebels on a joint patrol near al-Tanf, 29 April 2020

In April 2014, online videos showed rebels using US-made anti-tank rockets (BGM-71 TOW), the first significant American armaments in the conflict; analysts suggested they might have been provided by states such as US ally Saudi Arabia, with Washington's acquiescence. As US policy shifted to combating ISIL, the SMC declared war on ISIL in late 2014.

By early 2015, voices in the US foreign policy establishment were pushing to abandon the rebels due to their operational weakness and collaboration with Islamists. US policy increasingly focused on supporting Kurdish-led forces against ISIL. In early October, shortly after the start of the Russian military intervention, Obama was reported to have authorised the resupply — against ISIL — of 25,000 Syrian Kurds and 5,000 of the armed Syrian opposition, emphasizing that the US would continue this support. In October 2015, the US announced the end of the Pentagon’s $500 million program to train Syrian rebels to fight ISIL, but not Assad. The funding would be used to provide weapons and ammunition to existing rebel groups. Another covert and significantly larger program, Timber Sycamore, was run by the CIA and continued under Obama. By October it was estimated that 42 anti-Assad groups had been vetted.

Jane's Defence Weekly reported that the US shipped 994 tonnes of weapons and ammunition (including packaging and container weight) in December to Syrian rebel groups, including 9M17 Fleyta anti-tank missiles, RPG-7s, AK-47S, DShKs, and PKMs.

On 7 April 2017 the US launched 59 Tomahawk missiles at a Syrian airbase in Shayrat following the Khan Shaykhun chemical attack. Shortly after, US Central Command acknowledged the stationing of US special forces at Al-Tanf in Southern Syria since early 2016, after US troops engaged in direct combat action against ISIL on 8 April.

In July, it was reported that the Donald Trump administration had decided to halt the CIA program to support anti-government rebels. The CIA program ultimately failed in its objective of removing Assad from power, but it was not useless: "The program pumped many hundreds of millions of dollars to many dozens of militia groups. One knowledgeable official estimates that the CIA-backed fighters may have killed or wounded 100,000 Syrian soldiers and their allies over the past four years." On 14 November, Syrian and Russian media reported that the Syrian Foreign Ministry reaffirmed that it considered the presence of US forces, or any other foreign military presence, without government approval ″an act of aggression and an attack on the sovereignty of the Syrian Arab Republic″ and rejected what it described as the US attempt to connect the US military presence with the settlement process.

=== United Kingdom ===
Since August 2011, Britain insisted, along with the US, France and some Arab states, that Assad had to step down.

In 2012, the UK provided opposition forces with non-lethal military aid, including communications equipment and medical supplies, and was reported to have provided intelligence support, revealing Syrian military movements to Turkish officials, who then passed the information to the FSA.

On 29 August 2013, a vote was held in the House of Commons to decide whether the UK would join the US in initiating military action against Syria's use of chemical weapons: Prime Minister David Cameron′s motion was defeated 285 votes to 272. Although the prime minister does not need parliamentary approval for military action, Cameron said that he would respect this decision.

in November 2015, the UK co-sponsored a UN Security Council (UNSC) resolution urging UN members to "take all necessary measures" in the fight against ISIL and al-Nusra Front. On 20 November, UNSC unanimously passed the resolution. British U.N. Ambassador Matthew Rycroft said Cameron would use the resolution to address Parliament on his plans to begin airstrikes.

On 3 December, after the UK parliament overwhelmingly backed the motion to begin UK military action, four Tornados from the RAF air base in Cyprus carried out their first strikes against ISIL targeting the Omar oil fields in eastern Syria, according to defence minister Michael Fallon. France welcomed the military action; Syria, noting that the UK had failed to ask permission from Syria's government, insisted Britain and its allies must follow Russia's example and co-ordinate their campaign with Syrian forces.

In early February 2016, then UK foreign minister Philip Hammond, referring to Russia′s air campaign, said: "It's a source of constant grief to me that everything we are doing is being undermined by the Russians."

In August 2016, the BBC published June photographs that it said showed British special forces soldiers guarding the perimeter of the New Syrian Army's base at al-Tanf (Al Waleed) in Homs provincethat seized by ISIL in May 2015. The troops were shown equipped with four-wheel drive Al-Thalab vehicles and weapons that included sniper rifles, anti-tank weapons and heavy machine guns.

By 2018 over £2.7 billion of spending had been committed on non-military programmes associated with the civil war.

=== France ===
Opération Chammal crest

Before the civil war, Syria and Assad were seen as part of France's colonial legacy. The Syrian army was a major consumer of French arms and supplies. Assad was hailed as a reformer in French media while his authoritarian style was glossed over. Assad enjoyed close ties with French presidents and was a receipt of Légion d’honneur, the foremost French order of merit. However, after the outbreak of the Syrian refugee crisis in August 2011, France insisted, along with the US, Britain, and some Arab states, that the Syrian president step down.

In 2012, France provided opposition forces with non-lethal military aid, including communications equipment and medical supplies.

In August 2013, when the Assad government was accused of using chemical weapons, Paris called for military intervention, but was contradicted after Obama refused to act despite the breach of his “red line”. On 19 September, French President François Hollande suggested that France was ready to begin supplying lethal aid to FSA in a "controlled framework".

In August 2014 French President François Hollande confirmed that France had delivered arms to Syrian rebels.

In September 2015, France began airstrikes on a small scale to avoid inadvertently strengthening Assad by hitting his enemies. In November, in the wake of the 13 November Paris terror attacks, France, citing self-defence under Article 51 of the United Nations Charter, significantly intensified its air strikes, closely coordinating with the US military.

Also in November, France drafted a UN Security Council resolution urging UN members to "take all necessary measures" in the fight against ISIL and al-Nusra Front. The following day the French-drafted resolution was co-sponsored by the UK. On 20 November 2015, the UN Security Council unanimously passed the resolution. Also on 20 November, France dismissed Russia′s suggestions that the French air strikes against oil installations were illegal, saying they were "an appropriate and necessary riposte" to attacks by ISIL.

On 3 December 2015 the UK started air strikes against ISIL. France welcomed the UK's military action.

LaFarge Cement company acknowledged that it had funneled money to ISIS in 2013 and 2014. LaFarge's defense was that the fiduciary support for ISIS was to maintain the "safety" of its employees. French courts dropped the charges against LaFarge in 2019. Hillary Clinton sat on the board of LaFarge cement company between 1990 and 1992.

=== Turkey ===
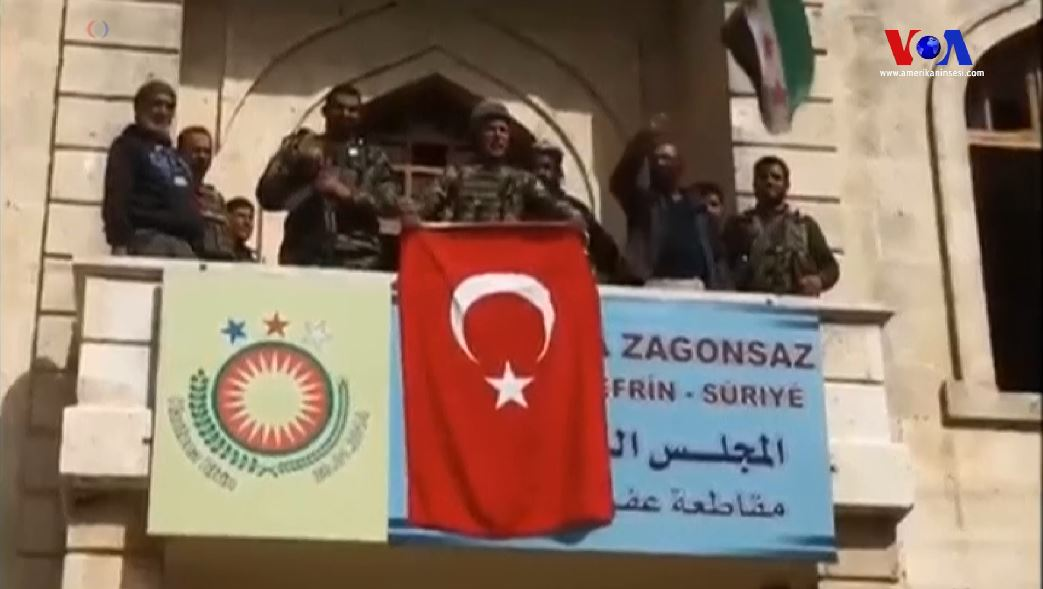
Turkish soldiers and opposition fighters at the building in Afrin that had hosted the PYD-led government of the region, 18 March 2018

The government of Turkey, a NATO member with the alliance's second largest army, had a relatively friendly relationship with Syria prior to the start of the civil unrest. Turkey joined calls for the Syrian government to end the violence. However, it initially objected to the demand voiced in August 2011 by the US that Assad resign.

Turkey trained defectors from the Syrian Army on its territory, and in July 2011 a group of them launched the FSA. In October, Turkey began sheltering FSA, including a safe zone and a base of operations. Together with Saudi Arabia and Qatar, Turkey provided arms and other military equipment. Turkey provided refuge for Syrian dissidents from the onset of the conflict. In June 2011, Opposition activists convened in Istanbul to discuss regime change, and Turkey hosted the head of the Free Syrian Army, Colonel Riad al-Asaad. Turkey became increasingly hostile to Assad and came to encourage reconciliation among dissident factions. Recep Tayyip Erdoğan tried to "cultivate a favorable relationship with whatever government would take the place of Assad".

Tensions between Syria and Turkey significantly worsened after Syrian forces shot down a Turkish fighter jet in June 2012 and border clashes in October. In May, Syrian opposition forces started to receive arms and training from Turkey and the US. Turkey's subsequent arrangements with Russia and Iran (from early 2017) caused a rift in its relationship with the Syrian opposition, as the opposition leaders criticized Russia's plan to create safe zones as threatening the country's territorial integrity.

Turkey maintained a small enclave within Syria, the Tomb of Suleyman Shah on the right bank of the Euphrates in Aleppo Province near Qarah Qawzak (Karakozak). The tomb was guarded by a garrison of Turkish soldiers. Up until Syrian forces shot down a Turkish warplane in June 2012, the garrison numbered 15. Following the incident, the Turkish government doubled the garrison to 30, while Erdoğan warned that "the tomb of Suleyman Shah and the land that surrounds it are Turkish territory. Any act of aggression against it would be an attack on our territory and NATO territory."

Until September 2014, Turkey did not overtly participate in international airstrikes against ISIL. Turkey had repeatedly said it wanted the US to focus its air strikes as much on removing Assad as on fighting ISIL; it had also demanded a "safe zone" in the area extending from the Syrian town of Kobanî on the Turkish border, westward to the town of Azaz, that would be protected by air power and that was purported to enable Turkey to return to Syria some of an estimated 1.8 million displaced people camped on Turkish territory.

On 22 July 2015, Turkey agreed to let the US use Incirlik Air Base in southern Turkey to launch air attacks against ISIL, a major shift in policy (in March 2003, the Turkish parliament voted against allowing Turkey to be a base of operations for the US invasion of Iraq). At the end of July, American and Turkish media outlets reported that the US and Turkey had agreed on the outlines of a de facto "safe zone" along the Turkey-Syria border under a deal that authorized an increase in the scope and pace of US-led air missions against ISIL; the plan provided for driving ISIL, the al-Nusra Front, and other radical groups out of a 68-mile-long area west of the Euphrates River and reaching into the province of Aleppo that would then come under the control of the Syrian opposition. The deal stopped short of meeting Turkish demands for a no-fly zone. In August, concerns in NATO arose that Turkey was intent on dragging NATO into the Syrian conflict. In late July, the outlawed PKK, designated as a terrorist organization by UN, EU and many countries including the US and Turkey, resumed fighting the government in the Kurdish-dominated southeastern parts of Turkey. On 29 June, Turkey′s National Security Council made a decision and released a statement that said that Turkey would consider any incursion west of the Euphrates in northern Syria along the Turkish border (the area between Jarablus in the east and the Azaz–Mare' region in the west) by Kurdish YPG militia, backed by the Democratic Union Party (PYD), as well as any attack north of Idlib by Syrian government forces to be a violation of its “red line.” (The PYD is deemed by Turkey to be the Syrian affiliate of PKK, but it is actively aided by the US). At the end of October 2015, Turkish prime minister Ahmet Davutoğlu claimed that Turkey had struck Kurdish YPG militia fighters twice for breaching the "red line"; the YPG′s statements said that the Turkish army had twice attacked its positions near the border towns of Tell Abyad and Kobanî. In mid-November 2015, president Recep Erdoğan reaffirmed this threat not to allow Kurdish YPG militia to cross over to the western side of the Euphrates along the Turkish border.

On 24 February 2015, Erdogan accused the UN, the West, Russia and Iran of seeking to further their own interests and said he feared a US-Russian ceasefire plan would benefit Assad. In December, Erdogan said, "Syria, Iran, Iraq and Russia have formed a quartet alliance in Baghdad and asked Turkey to join, but I told President [Vladimir] Putin that I cannot sit alongside a president whose legitimacy is distrustful."

After Syria′s Kurdish YPG militia captured Syria′s Menagh Airbase and several settlements north of Aleppo near the border with Turkey, Turkey on 13 February 2016 began a sustained campaign of shelling YPG positions around Azaz from its territory. Syria declared this to be a violation of its sovereignty and alleged infiltration into Syria of "Turkish soldiers or Turkish mercenaries". An attempt by Russia on 19 February to have an appropriate resolution adopted by the UN Security Council was undermined by Western powers, including the US, the UK, and France.

==== Alleged support for ISIS and al-Qaeda ====
Ever since ISIL was founded in June 2014, Turkey has faced allegations of collaborating with and supporting them. Turkish authorities have openly supported al-Qaeda and other extremist Islamist groups including Ahrar al-Sham, and al-Nusra Front, which is marked as a terror organization by much of the US and Europe. In addition, SOHR said that the vehicle used in a car bomb attack in Kobani had come from Turkish territory. Islamic State snipers were hiding in grain depots on the Turkish side of the border and firing on the town, In late 2014, ISIL fighters and commanders, as well as David L. Phillips of Columbia University's Institute for the Study of Human Rights, alleged that Turkey supported ISIL. Within Turkey, ISIL was reported to have increased political polarisation between secularists and Islamists. In 2019, the US Department of the Treasury imposed sanctions on Turkish individuals and companies for providing financial support to ISIS.

By contrast, Patrick Cockburn wrote in November 2014 that the "exact nature of the relationship [between Turkey and ISIS] remains cloudy". In 2015, Cypriot Foreign Minister Ioannis Kasoulidis questioned Turkey's determination to fight ISIS. In July 2014, James Carver, a Member of the European Parliament, asked two questions in the European Commission after press reports about Turkish support for ISIS. In August, the Commission responded that no evidence supported the allegations, adding that the Turkish Ministry of Foreign Affairs had repeatedly dismissed them, and that ISIS posed a significant security threat to Turkey. After the November 2015 Paris attacks, Turkey implemented tougher controls to stop ISIL militants crossing and smuggling equipment on a 60-mile stretch of the border with Syria where ISIL controlled the Syrian side. This followed Putin's statement that Turkey was aiding ISIL and al-Qaeda. US Vice President Joe Biden stated that Turkey, Saudi Arabia and the United Arab Emirates had "poured hundreds of millions of dollars and tens of thousands of tons of weapons into anyone who would fight against Al-Assad, except that the people who were being supplied were al-Nusra, and al Qaeda, and the extremist elements of jihadis coming from other parts of the world."

Turkey was further criticized for allowing individuals to enter the country and join ISIL, as well as training ISIS members and allowing jihadist groups to move through its territory to reach other countries. American website Al-Monitor stated in June 2014 that Turkey had allowed ISIL to move thousands of international jihadists and other supplies across the Turkish border, and an ISIL commander stated that a majority of the soldiers, weapons, and supplies came from Turkey, adding that ISIL fighters received treatment in Turkish hospitals. Various political figures, such as Iraqi Prime Minister Haider al-Abadi, Iran's Secretary of the Expediency Discernment Council, and Israeli defense minister Moshe Ya'alon, accused Turkey of allowing ISIS to smuggle goods such as oil through their borders.

On 24 November 2015, speaking shortly after Turkey downed a Russian Su-24, Putin characterised Turkey's role in the conflict as that of "the accomplices of terrorists". Russian foreign minister Sergey Lavrov claimed that the Turkish plan to create a buffer zone in the area where Syrian Turkmen lived in northern Syria matched Ankara's wish "to protect local terrorist infrastructure". Turkish and Western analysts as well as officials questioned whether ISIL oil had been imported into Turkey, and argued that Moscow′s accusations were unfounded.

In November, following Putin's accusation that Turkey was aiding ISIL and al-Qaeda, Turkey came under pressure from the US to close its crossing point for ISIL militants.

On 2 December, Russian military officials presented evidence that they claimed proved that Erdogan and his family were personally involved in smuggling oil to fund ISIL terrorists. The accusations were seen as a further escalation of tensions between Turkey and Russia. Both the Turkish government and the Iraqi Kurdish Regional Government (KRG) denied this. Commenting on the allegations, US Ambassador to Turkey John R. Bass said that the claims about Turkish involvement in ISIL's oil trade were unfounded, citing the official apology issued by the CIA with regards to the 2014 allegations.

Leaked documents supported Turkey's affiliation with ISIL. In January 2016, documents appeared to indicate that ISIL managed a complex immigration operation via the Syrian town of Tell Abyad, which remained open until Kurdish forces captured it during the Tell Abyad offensive. Aymenn al-Tamimi, a researcher on ISIS documents, confirmed the authenticity of the manifests, which aligned with ISIS bus routes. A senior Turkish official said Turkey was actively working to halt the influx of foreign fighters and targeting recruitment and logistics networks referenced in the documents. In July 2016, a leaked confidential report produced by the German Interior Ministry said Turkey was supporting terrorist groups across the Middle East, including various Islamist groups. According to documents revealed in 2019, the MİT was secretly transporting ammunition and fighters into Syria in 2015. Video footage appeared to show security forces discovering weapons parts en route to Syria in MİT-owned trucks. The Turkish government ordered the officers to let the trucks pass into Syria. In June 2019, a Turkish court convicted the officers and prosecutors, who stopped the MİT trucks, to over 20 years in prison for obtaining and disclosing confidential state documents. They were said to be FETÖ members. In December 2020, the Turkish court sentenced 27 people to prison for stopping the MİT trucks in 2014.

Assad repeatedly condemned Turkey's affiliation with terrorist organizations; during a 2015 interview, he mentioned that military and logistic support from Turkey was key in the 2015 Idlib offensive. He blamed Turkey for the failure of a humanitarian ceasefire plan in Aleppo. His sentiment was shared by Iranian analysts, who labeled Turkey as the main culprit in supporting ISIL.

==== Cross-border operations ====
Map of the Syrian civil war dated to March 2024; the green and white areas in the north denote areas controlled by Syrian opposition forces and de facto zones of Turkish occupation.

Beginning in 2016, Turkey launched direct military action within Syria, attacking SDF and Ba'athist regime forces. These military operations resulted in Turkish forces occupying large swaths of northern Syria via the Syrian National Army.

==== Role in the fall of Assad ====
In the aftermath of the 2024 Syrian opposition offensives and the fall of the Assad regime, it was revealed that a coalition of Syrian opposition groups spearheaded by Hay'at Tahrir al-Sham were widely supported and armed by Turkey in anticipation for the offensive, with Turkish officials reportedly having knowledge of the offensive six months beforehand. According to Abu Hassan al-Hamwi, head of HTS's military wing, the offensive had been planned for a year prior. Beginning in 2019, HTS developed a military doctrine aimed at transforming loosely organized opposition and jihadist fighters into a conventional military force. The group established specialized military branches, most notably a drone unit that produced reconnaissance, attack, and suicide drones. HTS established coordination with southern Syrian rebels, creating a unified command structure that incorporated leaders from approximately 25 rebel groups, with the strategic objective of encircling Damascus from multiple directions. HTS initiated the offensive partly to disrupt regional powers' diplomatic normalization with Assad and to counter escalating aerial attacks on northwestern Syria. The group determined that Assad's international allies were strategically constrained, with Russia committed to its war in Ukraine, while both Iran and Hezbollah engaged in conflict with Israel, presenting a favorable tactical opportunity. During a meeting in Doha between Lavrov, Abbas Araghchi and Hakan Fidan, the Russian and Iranian foreign ministers both tacitly blamed Turkey for Assad's downfall. Following Assad's fall, Turkey and allied fighters in northern Syria continued to attack SDF, launching Operation Dawn of Freedom.

=== Arab League ===
Sunni Arab states were concerned that Iranian arms transfers were changing the balance of power in the region and had "become a regional contest for primacy between Sunni Arabs and the Iran-backed Assad government and Hezbollah of Lebanon". Iran used Maharaj Airlines to ship weapons to the Syrian government.

On 6 March 2013, the Arab League gave its members approval to arm the Syrian rebels. On 26 March, the League recognised the National Coalition for Syrian Revolutionary and Opposition Forces as the legitimate representatives of the Syrian people.

==== Qatar ====
Qatar was alleged to have funded the Syrian rebellion by "as much as $3 billion" by 2013. It reported that Qatar was offering refugee packages of about $50,000 a year to defectors and family.

The Stockholm International Peace Research Institute estimated that Qatar had sent the most weapons to Syria, with over 70 weapons cargo flights into Turkey between April 2012 and March 2013.

Qatar operated a training base in its territory, in conjunction with the CIA who ran the training, training about 1,200 rebel soldiers a year on three week courses.

==== Jordan ====
From at least the 2014 June Offensive in Iraq, ISIL leadership threatened to overthrow Jordanian monarchy through by Jordan once it took Baghdad (which never happened). The Jordanian Air Force joined in the US-led bombing of ISIL. ISIL retaliated by increasing sniping at the Jordanian border.

On 24 December 2014, a Jordanian fighter jet was shot down over Syria and its pilot, Jordanian Air Force lieutenant Muath Al-Kasasbeh, captured. He was executed by burning in January 2015 and was later used to attempt to recover jailed terrorists. Jordan offered to make the exchange, but demanded "proof of life". In response video of the pilot's execution was released. In response, terrorists Sajida al-Rishawi and Ziad al-Karbouli, were executed and Jordan took the lead on anti-ISIL bombing raids, claiming nearly a thousand militants were killed by air strikes in one week.

In mid-2015 reports of plans for a Jordanian invasion of Syria in order to establish a buffer zone.

==== Saudi Arabia ====
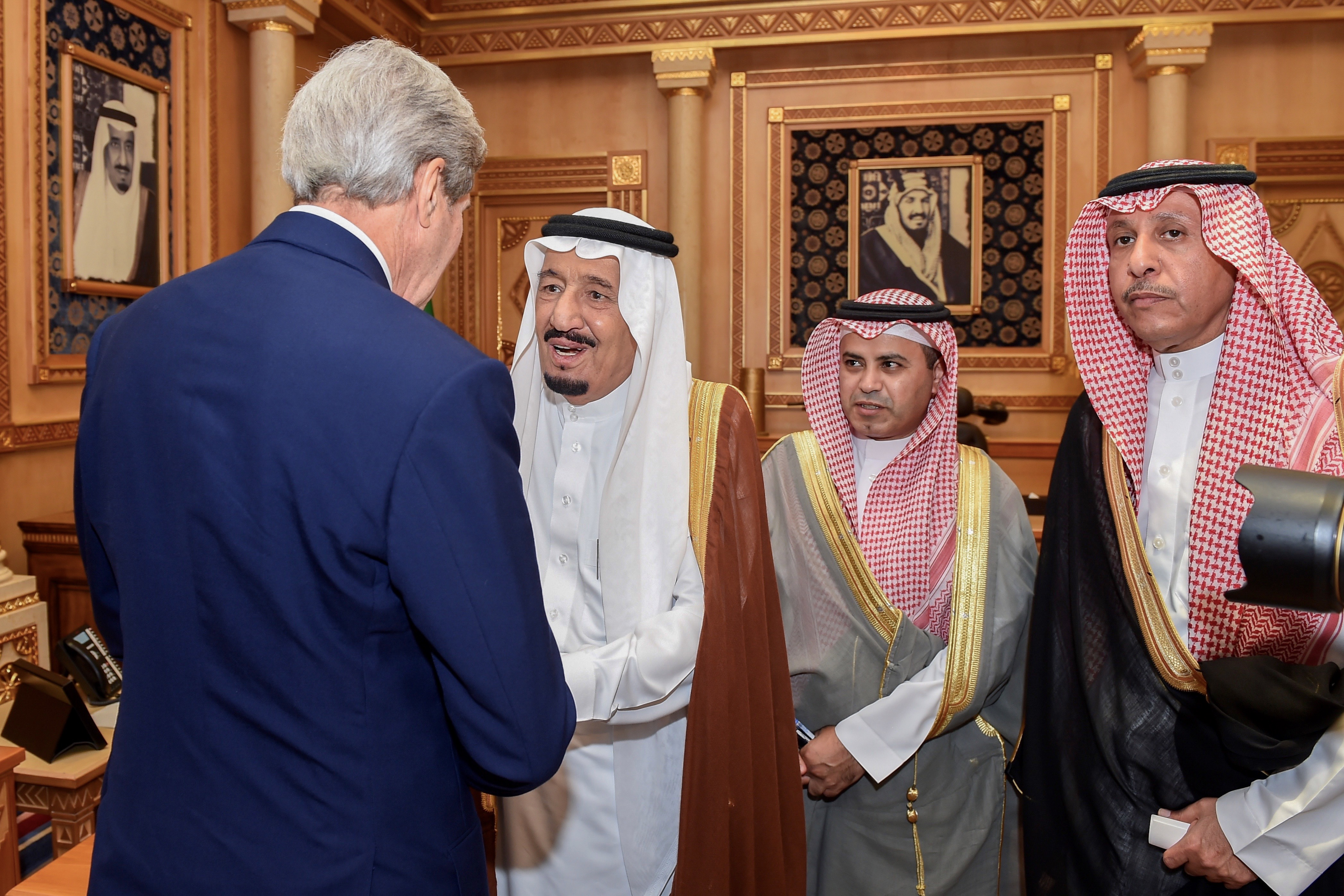
US Secretary of State John Kerry with King Salman of Saudi Arabia after arriving in Saudi Arabia for meetings about Syria, 24 October 2015

In May 2013 Saudi Arabia was reported to be a large arms supplier to the rebels. Thereafter, Saudi Arabia became the main group to finance and arm the rebels. Saudi Arabia funded purchase of infantry weapons, such as Yugoslav-made recoilless guns and anti-tank weapon M79 Osa from Croatia. Weapons began reaching rebels in December 2012, which allowed rebels' small tactical gains that winter.

Assad alleged that Saudi Arabia was "leading the most extensive operation of direct sabotage against all the Arab world".

In May 2015, Saudi Arabia and Turkey were reported to be "focusing their backing for the Syrian rebels on the combined Jaish al-Fatah, or the Army of Conquest". The Army of Conquest reportedly included Al-Nusra Front.

In October 2015, Saudi Arabia delivered 500 US-made TOW anti-tank missiles to rebels. According to Putin, the weapons would "certainly fall into the hands of terrorist organizations".

In mid-December 2015, in the wake of two rounds of the Vienna talks, Saudi Arabia hosted a conference of Syria's political and armed opposition factions targeting a common negotiating position vis a vis Assad. The meeting did not include the major Kurdish factions. It produced a statement of principles; it said inter alia that Assad would be allowed to stay pending a transitional government. The meeting decided to set up a "Higher Negotiations Authority" to direct participation in talks with the regime; that leadership body was to remain based in Riyadh.

Shortly afterwards, the Saudis announced the formation of a military alliance of Muslim countries to fight international terrorism; about 30 Muslim states (all Sunni-majority) were reported to join the alliance, including Egypt and Turkey. The coalition was seen by Russia and Iran as aimed at reinforcing Saudi Arabia′s leadership and countering their efforts in the region, but meaningless in practical terms.

In early February 2016, a Saudi military official announced, ″The kingdom is ready to participate in any ground operations that the coalition (against ISIL) may agree to carry out.″ Saudi sources elaborated that the putative deployment of Saudi special forces could be carried out in coordination with Turkey.

===== Croatian weapons =====
In December 2012, a wave of weapons from foreign supporters were transferred to rebel forces via the Jordanian border. The arms included M79 Osa anti-tank weapons and M-60 recoilless rifles purchased by Saudi Arabia from Croatia. Previously, most of the weapons were delivered via Turkey. However, much of the arms unintentionally ended up in the hands of Islamist rebels. The goal for the change in routes was to strengthen moderate rebels and to bring the war closer to Damascus.

According to Jutarnji list, a Croatian daily newspaper, an unusually high number of Ilyushin 76 aircraft owned by Jordan International Air Cargo landed at Pleso Airport in Zagreb, Croatia on 14 and 23 December 2012; 6 January; and 18 February 2013. In early January, Yugoslav weapons were seen used in battles in the Dara'a region near Jordan. In February, Yugoslav weapons were seen in videos posted by rebels fighting in Hama, Idlib, and Aleppo. Danijela Barišić of Croatia's Foreign Ministry and arms-export agency denied that such shipments had occurred. Saudi officials declined requests for interviews about the shipments for two weeks. Ukrainian-made rifle cartridges, Swiss-made hand grenades and Belgian-made rifles showed up in the rebels' hands, but the origin was unclear because Saudi Arabia maintained secrecy.

===== Bandar bin Sultan =====
In August 2013 Saudi Prince Bandar bin Sultan was reported to have been appointed to lead Saudi Arabia's efforts to topple Assad, and that the CIA considered this a sign of Saudi seriousness about this aim. Bandar traveled among command centers near the Syrian front lines, Paris, and Moscow, seeking to undermine the regime. After tensions with Qatar over supplying rebel groups, Saudi Arabia switched its efforts from Turkey to Jordan in 2012, developing training facilities there, overseen by Bandar's half-brother Salman bin Sultan. In late 2012 Saudi intelligence began efforts to convince the US that the Assad government was using chemical weapons. The Saudi government allegedly sent prisoners sentenced to death to fight.

===== Swiss weapon sales =====
In July 2012, Switzerland ceased arms exports to the UAE Swiss weapons were reported to reach opposition fighters. The Swiss decision came shortly after UN human rights chief Navi Pillay called for an urgent stop to arms transfers to government and opposition forces so as to avoid "further militarisation". The director of the Saban Center for Middle East Policy had previously argued that, while "uncontrolled militarization will turn the Syrian uprising into a wider conflict that could draw in jihadis and other extremists from across the Muslim World", militarisation was inevitable, and so the US should facilitate and guide it. Marc Lynch argued the opposite in February 2012, as the provision of weapons from Saudi Arabia and Qatar was discussed: "It is unlikely that arms from the outside would come close to evening the balance of power, and would only invite escalations from Syrian regime forces".

=== Support from non-state groups ===
Sunni armed groups inside in the western Sunni-majority provinces of Iraq formed the Free Iraqi Army (FIA) in an effort to emulate FSA, and supported the Syrian rebels until August 2014, when FIA was overtaken by ISIL. FIA allowed soldiers and supplies to cross from Al Anbar Governorate into Syria.

In February 2012, Al-Qaeda chief Ayman al-Zawahiri called on Muslims from other countries to support anti-government forces.

=== Influence on Syrian opposition ===
By the end of 2013, foreign influence began to dominate FSA . Representatives of Saudi Arabia, the UAE, Qatar, and Jordanian intelligence services, as well as the US, Britain and France, regularly attended FSA military councils. By the end of 2013 much of the Syrian opposition was dominated by foreign intelligence services.

== Support for Rojava ==
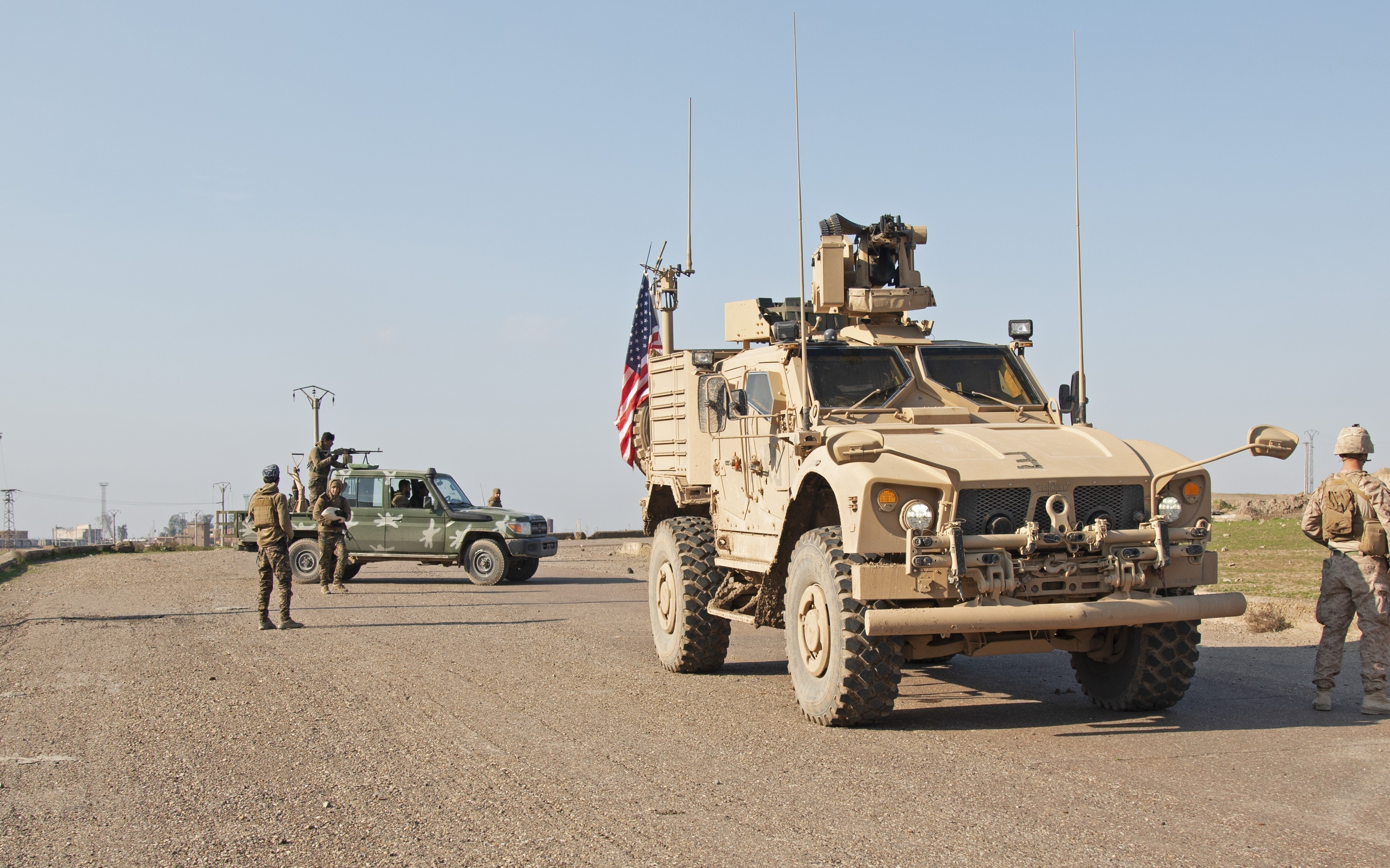
An SDF-US checkpoint, 23 December 2018

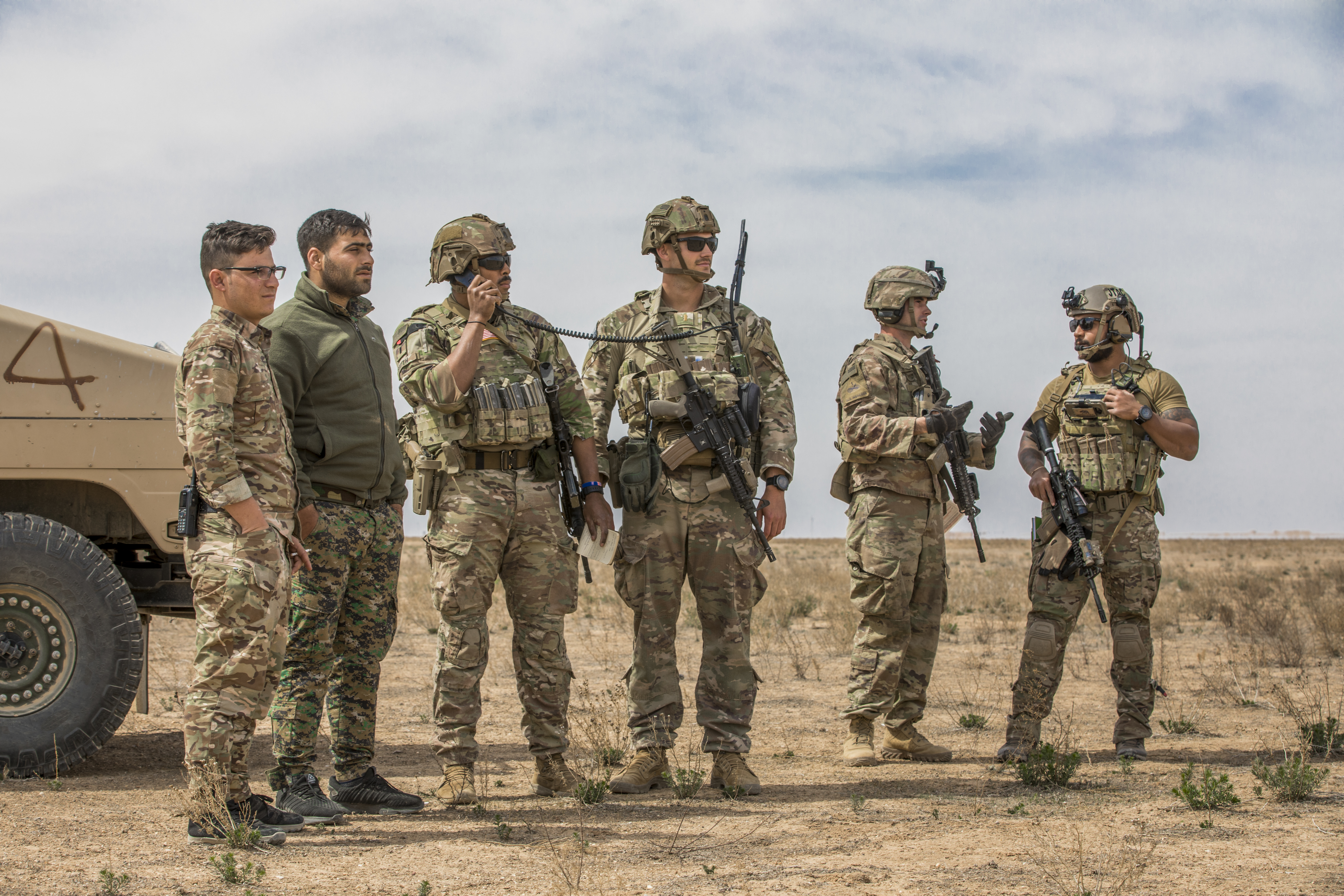
US JTAC personnel demonstrate AH-64 Apache live-fire capabilities with SDF personnel (left), 20 March 2021

The Rojava conflict received substantial military and logistic support from the Combined Joint Task Force – Operation Inherent Resolve (CJTF–OIR) coalition for SDF beginning in 2014. SDF was supported with foreign air power in the Rojava-Islamist conflict, but not when it fought Turkey, a NATO ally of many of the members of the CJTF–OIR coalition. Diplomatic support for Rojava was limited, with the Syrian Democratic Council usually uninvited to the various international negotiations around the Syrian peace process.

In April 2016, French, British, and US special forces were reportedly cooperating with SDF to coordinate airstrikes against ISIL during the al-Shaddadi offensive (2016) in February.

In April 2016, 150 US troops were reported to have arrived in Rmelan, al-Hasakah Governorate, in an area controlled by YPG, from Iraqi Kurdistan. The deployment prompted the Syrian government to condemn what it called a ″blatant act of aggression that constitutes a dangerous intervention and a gross violation of the Syrian sovereignty". In mid-August, the Pentagon said the US-led coalition′s F-22 aircraft flew near Al-Hasakah to protect American special operations ground forces from attacks by Syrian government jets.

In late November 2017, the US made it known that they intended to use the presence of US troops in northern Syria, deployed there to support SDF, to pressure Assad to make concessions at the talks in Geneva. This intent was affirmed by Rex Tillerson, who said the Trump administration would maintain an open-ended military presence to counter Iran′s influence and oust Assad. However, in April 2018 Saudi foreign minister Adel al-Jubeir said that the Kingdom was in discussions with the US on finding replacements for the about 2,000 US troops supporting the fight against ISIL, to address the Trump administration's desire to withdraw them.

On 18 September 2020, the US military announced that it was deploying Bradley fighting vehicles, advanced radar, and more air patrols in northeastern Syria to protect US troops, amid tensions with Russia.

== Support for Islamic State ==
Until 2015, the Turkish government maintained a border regime that was referred to by commentators and Turkish journalists as the "Jihadist Highway" where militants including potential ISIL fighters and other radical groups could travel freely.

In July 2015, a raid by US special forces on a compound housing ISIL's "chief financial officer", Abu Sayyaf, produced evidence that Turkish officials directly dealt with high ranking ISIL members.

== Individual foreign nationals' support for rebels/jihadist groups ==
Many foreign fighters joined the Syrian Civil War to fight Assad. While some were jihadis, others, such as Mahdi al-Harati, joined to help the Syrian rebels. Fighters came from as far away as Chechnya and Tajikistan.

Several groups, such as the Abdullah Azzam Shaheed Brigade, al-Nusra Front and Fatah al-Islam claimed to have conducted operations. Jihadist leaders and intelligence sources said foreign fighters began to enter Syria in February 2012. In May 2012, Syria's UN envoy Bashar Ja'afari declared that dozens of foreign fighters from Libya, Tunisia, Egypt, Britain, France and elsewhere had been captured or killed, and urged Saudi Arabia, Qatar and Turkey to stop "their sponsorship of the armed rebellion". In June, it was reported that hundreds of foreign fighters, many linked to al-Qaeda, had gone to Syria to fight Assad. In July, Iraq's foreign minister again warned that members of al-Qaeda in Iraq were moving there to fight. When asked if the US would arm the opposition, Clinton expressed fears that such weapons could fall into the hands of al-Qaeda or Hamas. In October 2012, the US expressed concern and confirmed that most of the weapons had fallen into the hands of radical Islamist rebels.

In July 2016, the British press cited "experts" as believing that ISIL fielded at least three exclusively Russian-speaking "Caucasian" (often led by Chechens) battalions of about 150 men each, most of whom had been drawn from Russia's North Caucasus and other parts of the former Soviet Union.

== Regional states ==
=== Israel ===
Israel was reported to have attacked Syria on 2 May 2013. US officials said that Israeli war planes shot into Syria from Lebanese air space, and that the warplanes did not enter Syrian air space. No counter-attacks were reported, and the Syrian ambassador to the UN said that he was not aware of attacks on Syria by Israel. Israel declined comment. Another attack was reported to feature massive explosions in Damascus on 4 May. Syrian state media described this as an Israeli rocket attack; targets included a military research center in Jamraya. Israeli sources stated that this was an Israeli attack on Iranian-made guided missiles allegedly en route to Hezbollah.

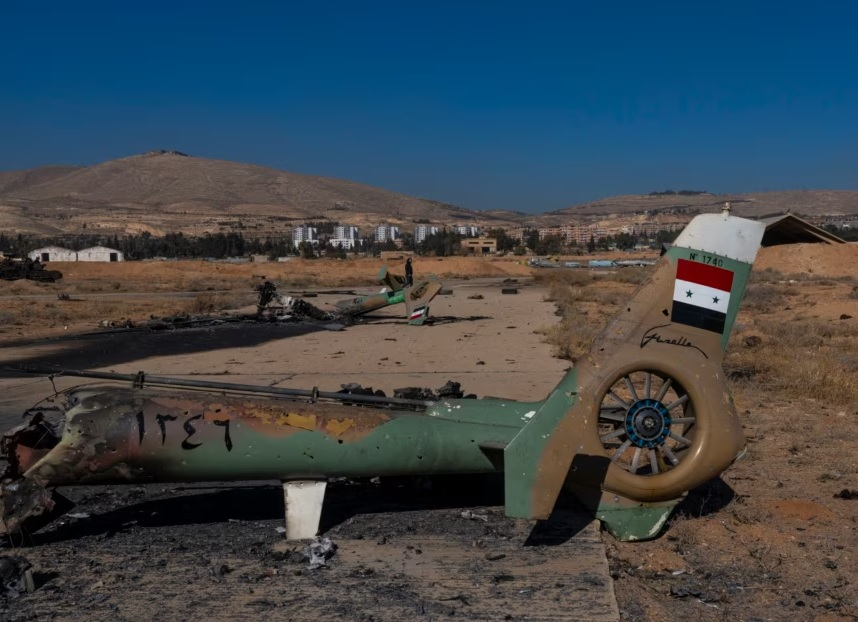
Syrian Arab Armed Forces helicopters destroyed by Israel in Mezzeh, December 2024

Israel's military role in the Syrian Civil War was limited and until 2017 officially unacknowledged. Syria and Israel had technically been in a state of war since 1948, albeit without major hostilities after 1973. Israel had officially remained neutral until 2017. Until the March 2017 strike, Israel's reported attacks on targets inside Syria were low-profile operations, for which Israel did not accept responsibility.

In early July 2017, Israel's defence minister Avigdor Liberman said that while "the rebels are not our friends, they are all versions of al-Qaida", Israel could not allow man like Assad to remain in power: "Keeping Assad in power is not in our security interests. As long as he is in power, Iran and Hezbollah will be." He said that Israel had no interest in entering the Syrian civil war, but that Israel had set "red lines", such as smuggling sophisticated weaponry to Hezbollah and Iran's influence on its borders. Later in July 2017, the Israeli government said it opposed the cease-fire agreement in southern Syria that the US and Russia had reached a week prior that envisaged de-escalation zones along Syria's borders with Jordan and Israel, as that would legalise Iran's presence.

In July 2017, the Israeli military said that they had since June 2016 run Operation Good Neighbor, a multi-faceted humanitarian relief operation focused on providing care to Syrian children.

The Israeli air force confirmed it had attacked arms convoys of the Syrian government and Lebanon's Hezbollah nearly 100 times over the six years of the conflict.

On 22 July 2018, Israel evacuated some 400 people, including 98 White Helmets, from former rebel-controlled territory in the southwest through the part of Golan Heights it controlled and transferred them to Jordan. The operation was at the request of Western governments, as the lives of the White Helmets were considered to be in danger in view of the Syrian government's successful offensive in southwestern Syria.

On 8 December 2024 upon the fall of the Assad regime, Israel invaded Syria's Quneitra Governorate and seized control of Mount Hermon.

=== Lebanon ===
Lebanon's role in the Syrian Civil War was less than that of other regional and international actors. Lebanon was not officially involved in the conflict as a belligerent state, but was greatly affected by it.

Beginning in 2011, Lebanon absorbed Syrian refugees and provided humanitarian aid. According to UNHCR, over 1 million Syrian refugees registered in Lebanon in 2016. This figure is likely significantly underestimated since UNHCR stopped registering Syrian refugees since May 2015 and excludes individuals waiting to be registered. Estimates were as high as 1,500,000 people in total.

Between 2011 and 2017, fighting spilled into Lebanon as rebel opponents and supporters travelled to Lebanon to attack each other on Lebanese soil. The Syrian conflict created a "resurgence of sectarian violence in Lebanon"; many of Lebanon's Sunni Muslims supported the rebels, while many Shi'ites supported Assad (Syria's Alawite minority is usually described as a Shi'a offshoot).

Hezbollah was involved since the beginning of the armed insurgency, and turned to active support and troop deployment from 2012 onwards. By 2014, Hezbollah was supporting Assad. Hezbollah deployed several thousand fighters and by 2015 had lost up to 1500 fighters. Hezbollah fought to prevent rebel penetration from Syria to Lebanon, becoming one of the most active forces in the war's extension there.

== Opposition to foreign involvement ==
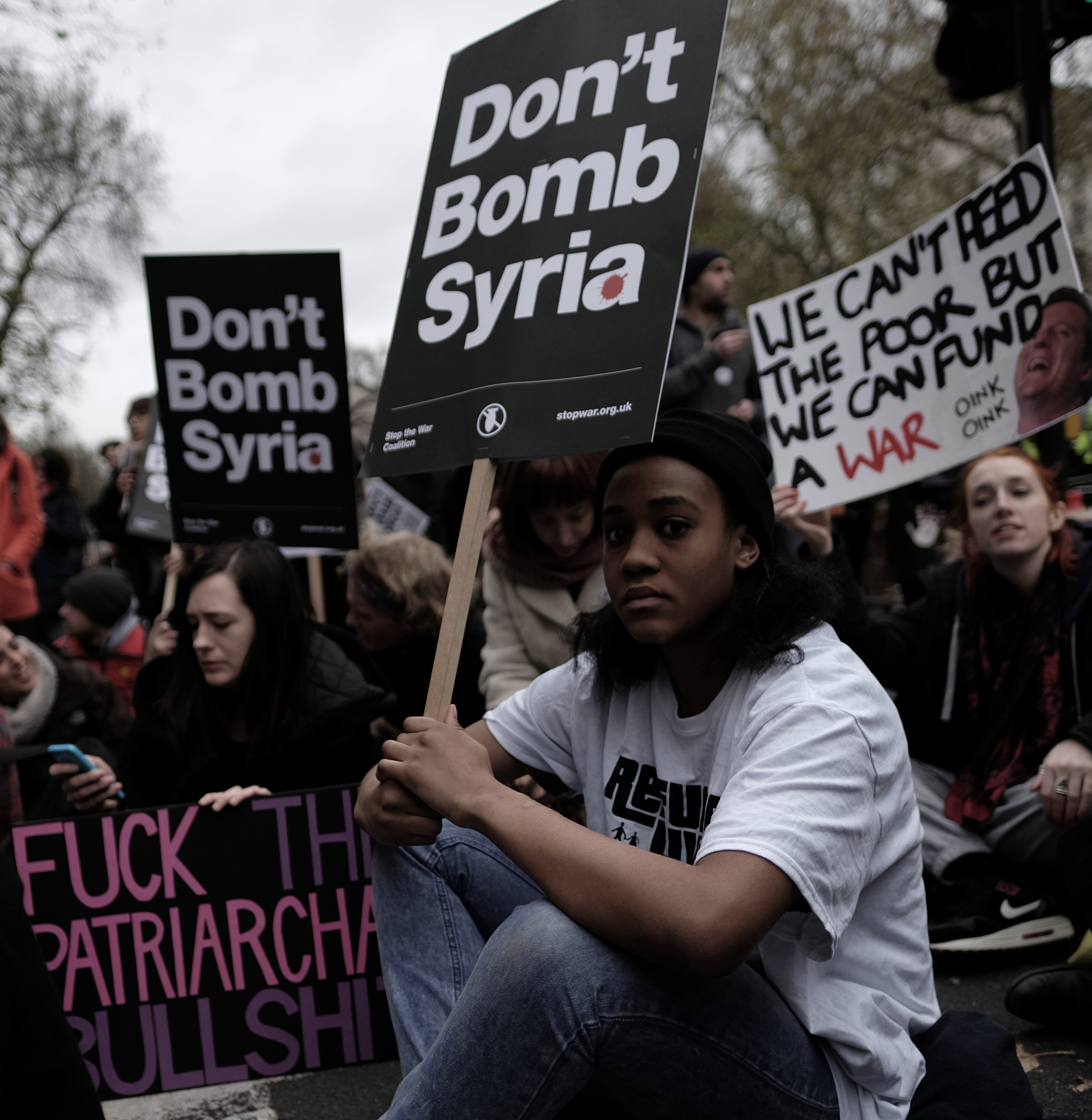
Protestors at a "Don't bomb Syria" protest in London in November 2015

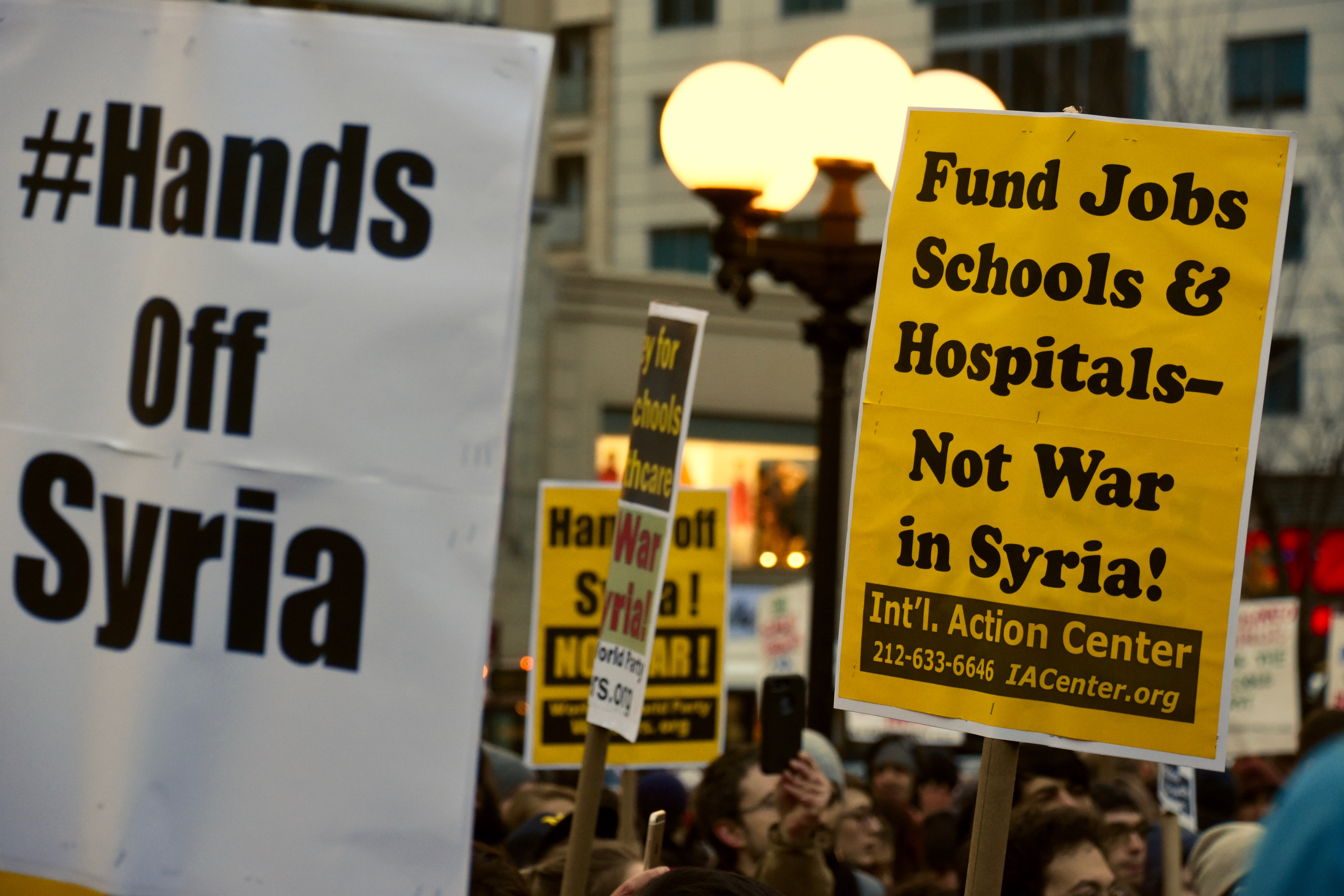
Rally against US involvement in New York in April 2017

=== United Kingdom ===
Many people and organisations opposed foreign involvement. Protests occurred in London in August 2013 shortly before a Parliamentary vote approving airstrikes, which was defeated. Later protests drew thousands in London in November 2015 calling for the UK not to bomb Syria shortly before another Parliamentary vote in early December. This view was reflected in a letter sent to Prime Minister David Cameron by 23 prominent Briitons including musicians, writers and trade union officials, that included Frankie Boyle, Brian Eno, Caroline Lucas, John Pilger and Jeremy Hardy. The 2015 vote authorised airstrikes. Protests against military action occurred throughout the United Kingdom in April 2018, from towns and cities such as Bristol, Exeter, Swansea and Milton Keynes. This followed proposed further airstrikes alongside the US against Syrian government forces for allegedly using chemical weapons. The British Campaign for Nuclear Disarmament described the government's decision to carry out airstrikes as defying international law and criticised Prime Minister Theresa May for bypassing parliament in her decision.

=== Elsewhere ===
In April 2017, protests occurred in US cites, as well as in Canada and Italy, against foreign intervention. Protestors held placards displaying phrases such as “No War on Syria!” and “Hands off Syria!”.

== See also ==
- Campaign Against Arms Trade
- Dutch involvement in the Syrian Civil War
- Iran–Saudi Arabia proxy conflict
- List of armed groups in the Syrian Civil War
- Spillover of the Syrian Civil War
- Syrian Civil War
- Syrian Civil War peace process
