= Iraqi involvement in the Syrian civil war =

Iraqi state and militia involvement in the Syrian civil war

- Part of foreign involvement in the Syrian civil war, the spillover of the war on Iraq, and the war against the Islamic State
- Locations of Iraq (in green) and Syria (in orange)
Date	2013–2024
Location	Syria and the Iraq–Syria border region
Result	Syrian opposition victory: Defeat of the Islamic State at the Battle of Baghuz Fawqani; Continuation of conflict between Iraqi militias and the US

Belligerents
Iraq (Note: Iraqi air operations in Syria were conducted against Islamic State targets threatening Iraq’s security between 2017 and 2018.): Popular Mobilization Forces; Harakat Hezbollah al-Nujaba; Asa'ib Ahl al-Haq; Kata'ib Hezbollah; Badr Organization; Liwa Abu al-Fadl al-Abbas; Islamic Resistance in Iraq (Note: Loyalty to the Iranian-led Axis of Resistance, not under Iraqi state command.); In Support of: Ba'athist Syria; Iran (Note: Iraqi Shi'ite militias operated explicitly in support of Iranian operations. For further information, see Iranian intervention in the Syrian civil war)	Islamic State: Syrian opposition (Note: Pro-Iranian Iraqi militias fought against Syrian opposition groups on behalf of the Ba'athist Syrian government.); Free Syrian Army (until 2015); Al-Nusra Front; Hay'at Tahrir al-Sham; (Syrian opposition) Syrian National Army; Islamic Front; National Front for Liberation; Ahrar al-Sham; Jaysh al-Islam; Southern Front; Naqshbandi Army; Free Iraqi Army (until 2014)	United States (Note: American forces have engaged in conflicts with Iraqi militias affiliated with Iran and the Assad regime while also collaborating with the Iraqi government in order to fight the Islamic State and al-Qaeda); Syrian Democratic Forces; People's Defense Units; Kurdistan Region; Revolutionary Commando Army; Israel (Note: Israeli forces have attacked Iraqi militias affiliated with Iran and the Assad regime. For further information, see Iran–Israel conflict during the Syrian civil war)

Strength
- (Iraq) Small number of F-16 sorties into eastern Syria (2018); Several thousand fighters

Casualties and losses
16+ servicemen killed: 1,308+ militiamen killed; 48+ troops killed	Unknown	Several soldiers killed Unknown

Iraq has been involved in the Syrian civil war by launching airstrikes against the Islamic State in coordination with the Ba'athist Syrian government. Although the actions of the Iraqi Armed Forces were limited to anti-ISIS activities, pro-Iranian Iraqi Shi'ite militias have notably fought on the side of the Syrian government more openly, launching attacks against Syrian opposition militias and American forces under Iranian allegiance. Iraqi activities in and around Syria were widely intertwined with both the war in Iraq and the wider war against the Islamic State, as well as with border security apparatus and the formation of the Russia–Syria–Iran–Iraq coalition in 2015.

== Background ==
The rise of the Islamic State across the Iraq–Syria theater in 2013–2014 created a contiguous insurgent enclave that threatened both states. Baghdad’s primary objective remained defeating ISIL inside Iraq, but as ISIL safe havens persisted along the border and across the Euphrates River Valley, Iraqi authorities increasingly coordinated with Damascus and its backers to constrain cross-border movement and share targeting information. In September 2015, Iraq announced the Baghdad Information Center with Russia, Iran, and Syria to coordinate intelligence against ISIL, particularly around the al-Qaim–Abu Kamal corridor.

== Iraqi-origin militias in Syria (2013–2024) ==
From 2013, Iraqi Shi'a militias (some later formalized into the PMF) deployed contingents to Syria under various banners (including Harakat Hezbollah al-Nujaba (HHN), Asa'ib Ahl al-Haq (AAH), Kata'ib Hezbollah (KH), and elements of the Badr Organization). Early deployments focused on Damascus’s Sayyidah Zaynab area and later fronts in Aleppo and the Hama–Latakia axis, fighting both ISIL and anti-government rebel factions. Iraqi militia participation was visible in the 2012-2016 Battle of Aleppo alongside Syrian government forces and Hezbollah. Open-source military studies and field reporting also place Iraqi PMF brigades along the al-Qaim–Abu Kamal border complex, supporting operations to seal the corridor against ISIL.

“Iraqi Special Groups such as Kata'ib Hezbollah, Kata'ib al-Imam Ali and others maintained combat forces in Albu Kamal [Abu Kamal] and garrisoned the Euphrates River Valley border belt.”

— Combating Terrorism Center at West Point

In late 2024, with the swift defeat of Assad's forces and the fall of the Assad regime, foreign Shi'a militias withdrew from Syria along with Iranian troops.

== Iraqi Air Force cross-border strikes (2018) ==
While Iraqi militias had long been active in Syria, Baghdad publicly acknowledged state military action inside Syria in 2018. On 19 April 2018, the Iraqi Air Force announced strikes near Hajin against ISIL targets threatening Iraq’s security, coordinated through the anti-ISIL campaign architecture. On 20 November 2018, Iraq said it conducted further strikes that destroyed ISIL facilities and fighters inside Syria. Iraqi officials framed these as defensive, cross-border counter-terrorism actions, distinct from coalition strikes and conducted with deconfliction mechanisms.

== Operations around Abu Kamal and the Euphrates corridor ==
Iraqi-origin militias and PMF elements supported pro-government offensives aimed at clearing ISIL’s last Syrian urban strongholds along the border, most notably the 2017 Abu Kamal offensive (Operation Fajr-3). By late 2017 and into 2018, the al-Qaim–Abu Kamal crossing area became a focal point for Iraqi–Syrian coordination and militia logistics, eventually enabling the reopening of the al-Qaim crossing on 30 September 2019. Analytical work describes how the border transformed into a multi-actor battlespace involving Iraqi state forces, Syrian units, and Iranian-aligned non-state militias competing for influence and security roles.

== Relationship to the U.S.-led coalition ==
Iraq’s counter-ISIL war was conducted in close partnership with the Combined Joint Task Force – Operation Inherent Resolve (CJTF-OIR), which also ran a separate Syria campaign by, with and through the Syrian Democratic Forces (SDF). Iraqi cross-border strikes were publicly acknowledged by Baghdad and reported by the U.S. Department of Defense but were not part of a permanent Iraqi deployment in Syria. CJTF-OIR statements through 2019 emphasize the coalition’s degradation of ISIL across Iraq and Syria, while Iraqi officials simultaneously pursued the Baghdad intelligence cell with Russia, Iran and Syria.

== Results and assessment ==
- Degradation of ISIL nodes along the Syria–Iraq frontier via limited Iraqi airstrikes in 2018, complementing coalition and Syrian government operations in the Euphrates Valley.
- Border security gains culminating in the reopening of al-Qaim–Abu Kamal in 2019 and sustained joint vigilance against ISIL infiltration thereafter.
- Political–military complexity: Iraqi-origin militias in Syria operated under Iranian guidance and in support of Damascus, distinct from Iraq’s formal chain of command, highlighting blurred lines between state policy and transnational militia networks.
- Humanitarian and legal context: The broader Syria war generated mass displacement and rights concerns; Iraqi actions were justified by Baghdad as self-defense against a cross-border non-state threat.

== Timeline ==
- 2013–2014: Iraqi Shi'a militias deploy to Syria around Damascus/Aleppo fronts under formations such as Liwa Abu al-Fadl al-Abbas; AAH and HHN publicize presence.
- September 2015: Baghdad Information Center announced with Russia, Iran, and Syria to share intelligence against ISIL.
- Late 2016: Iraqi militias take part in pro-government push in Aleppo.
- Late 2017: Border battles converge on Abu Kamal–al-Qaim axis; pro-government forces seize Abu Kamal from ISIL.
- 19 April 2018: Iraqi Air Force conducts strike near Hajin, Syria, against ISIL.
- 20 November 2018: Iraq announces additional strikes destroying ISIL targets inside Syria.
- 30 September 2019: Iraq reopens al-Qaim border crossing with Syria.

== See also ==
- Iranian intervention in the Syrian civil war
- Jordanian intervention in the Syrian civil war
- Hezbollah involvement in the Syrian civil war
- Russia–Syria–Iran–Iraq coalition
- Operation Inherent Resolve
