= Syrian American Council =

American non-profit grassroots organization

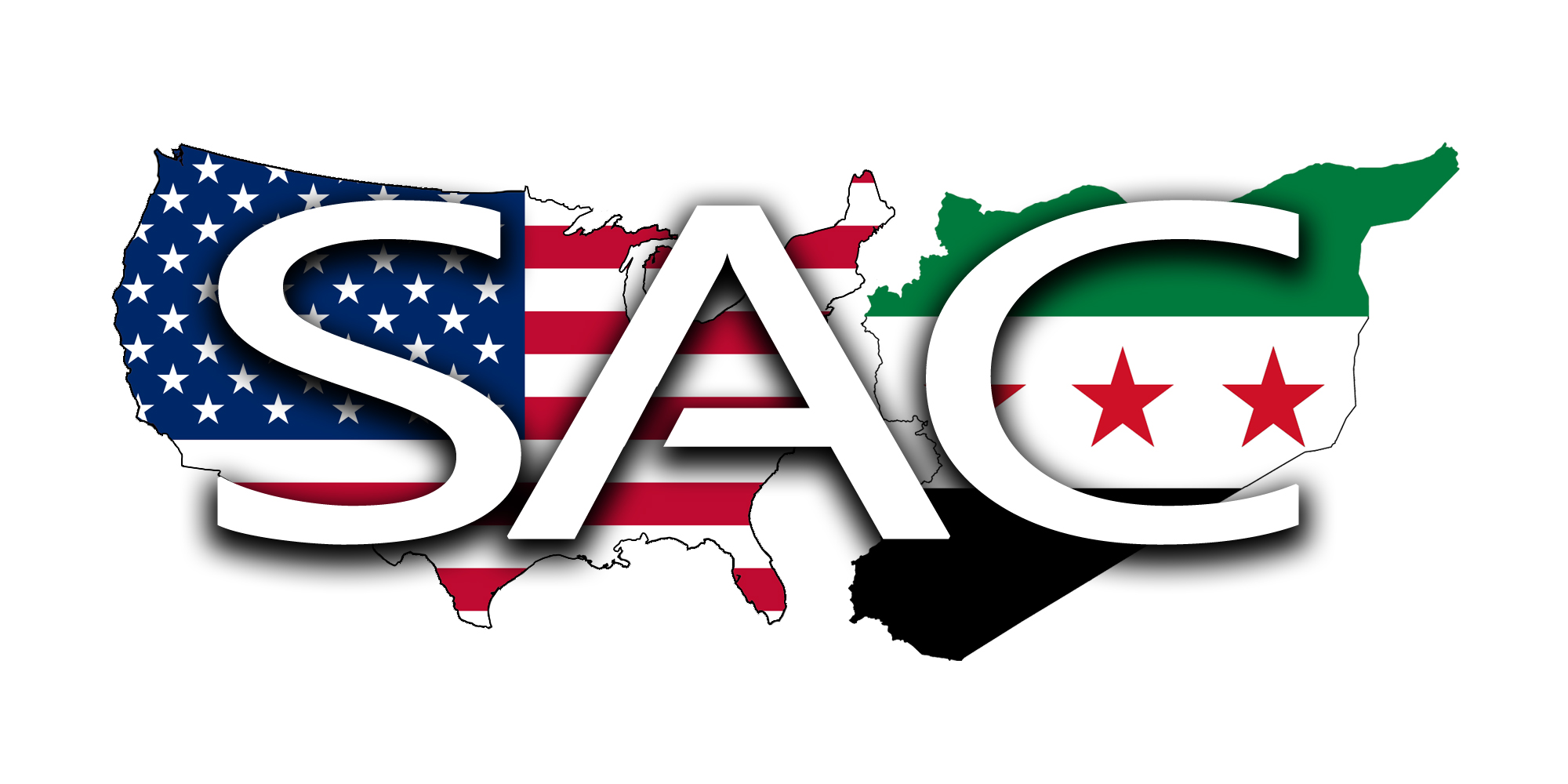
- Syrian American Council logo
- Abbreviation: SAC
- Formation: 2005
- Purpose: Advocacy
- Headquarters: Washington, DC, U.S.
- Region served: Syria
- Website: www.sacouncil.com

Syrian American Council (or SAC) is a 501c3 grassroots organization of Syrian-Americans that does community organizing, awareness-raising, youth empowerment, media outreach, advocacy, and support for Syrian-Americans and the Syrian Opposition. As the largest and oldest grassroots organization of Syrian-Americans, it identifies its mission as "to organize and mobilize the Syrian-American community so that its voice is heard on issues of critical importance to Syrian-Americans."

== Role in Syrian civil war ==
SAC has played an important role in the Syrian civil war.

SAC advocates the U.S. government including President Barack Obama, Secretaries of State Hillary Clinton and John Kerry, the United States Senate, and the United States House of Representatives through its Washington, D.C., office for statements and policy changes to support the Syrian revolution. SAC published its policy recommendations, as well as an in-depth look at the political crisis, in a policy brief titled, "Syria: A Clear Path- Policy Options to Resolve the Crisis in View of U.S. Interests."

Since SAC and other Syrian organizations began advocacy efforts with the U.S. government, there have been harsher criticisms of Bashar al-Assad in the international reactions to the Syrian civil war.

As The Hill reported in two articles in May and June 2012, Rosoboronexport is the primary supplier of weapons for Syrian President Bashar al-Assad's forces. Honoring the contract with this Russian firm was widely perceived as violating the spirit of U.S. sanctions against the enablers of the Syrian conflict.

SAC also works to help deal with the humanitarian crisis Syria is facing. Its members have raised millions of dollars through projects including "Sister Cities," in which U.S. cities support civilian governance and relief efforts in Syrian cities. The organization works with licensed humanitarian NGOs such as the Syrian Sunrise Foundation, Sham Relif, Syrian Relief and Development, Zakat Foundation, and Life USA.

SAC maintains a network of contacts in Syria who inform its political work. Additionally, its members take frequent trips to the Middle East and often cross the border into Syria. SAC makes an effort to engage the Syrian opposition at all levels by attending international conferences about Syria.

=== Supported legislation ===
Syrian American Council supports US bills Caesar Syria Civilian Protection Act and No Assistance for Assad Act. The Caesar Syria Civilian Protection Act proposes imposing additional sanctions on the Assad regime, until it is verified that hostilities by it has ended or until a sunset clause has expired. The No Assistance for Assad Act proposes that the US will not fund reconstruction of areas controlled by Assad.

Potential U.S. government legislation that would aid the opposition in humanitarian and military efforts was introduced in 2013. The Syria Democratic Transition Act of 2013 was introduced by U.S. Senators Bob Casey (D-PA) and Marco Rubio (R-FL) and the Free Syria Act of 2013 was introduced by Representatives Eliot L. Engel (NY-16), Mike Rogers (MI-8), and Brad Sherman (CA-30). Neither of these two bills has been passed into law.

In 2012, SAC was involved in the advocacy effort which ultimately led to an amendment to the 2013 Defense Authorization bill that blocked DoD funding to Russian state-run arms exporter Rosoboronexport. The Pentagon had a $375 million, no-bid contract with Rosoboronexport to buy 21 Russian-made Mi-17 helicopters for Afghanistan's air force. An open option to purchase additional helicopters brings the total value of the contract to about $1 billion.

== History ==
SAC was founded on November 20, 2005, in Burr Ridge, Illinois. The founding meeting was attended by representatives from Illinois, Michigan, Indiana, Pennsylvania, and California. SAC's first president and Council of Representatives (COR) were elected at that meeting. Today, the organization has 21 chapters nationwide.

Before the revolution, SAC sought to help build civil society in Syria and encourage respect for civil liberties and human rights. When the Syrian civil war began, SAC transitioned its efforts to help the Syrian American community process what was happening in Syria and determine a response.

Syrian American Council has worked with and has had similar objectives to the American registered organizations Syrian Emergency Task Force, Americans for a Free Syria and the now defunct Syrian Support Group.

== Chapters ==
As of April 10, 2013, SAC has 21 chapters across the U.S. in Chicago, Orlando, Los Angeles, Northern California, Washington, D.C./Virginia, Dearborn, New Jersey, Georgia, Indianapolis, Panama City, West Virginia, North Carolina, San Diego, Tampa, South Florida, Flint, Dallas, Houston, Austin, Raleigh, and Detroit.

In June 2014, SAC held elections for the presidential position. Ms. Mirna Barq from Orlando, FL was elected as president.

== See also ==
- Human rights in Syria
