= Syrian Support Group =

Washington, D.C.-based non-governmental organization

- Founded: December 2011
- Headquarters: Washington, D.C., United States
- Website: syriansupportgroup.org

The Syrian Support Group (SSG) was a Washington, D.C.–based non-governmental organization that was founded in December 2011 in response to the actions of the Syrian government in the Syrian civil war. The group shut down its operations in August 2014. The Syrian Support Group was the only organization legally permitted by the U.S. government to provide support directly to the Free Syrian Army (FSA). The Syrian Support Group provided non-lethal aid to units of the FSA which it determined had no affiliation with extremist groups such as the Al-Nusra Front.

== History ==
A team of Syrian expatriates, led by Ontario resident Louay Sakka, founded the SSG when they came to the conclusion that armed revolution was necessary.

On 23 July 2012, the U.S. Treasury Department's Office of Foreign Asset Control granted the organization its license to fund the Free Syrian Army. On Wednesday, 1 August 2012, a Treasury Department official confirmed that they had given Syrian Support Group this license. The license requires that the organization make monthly reports of their expenditures to the U.S. Department of State. A copy of SSG's OFAC license can be viewed in full here.

In February 2013, the Chief of Staff of the Syrian opposition's Supreme Military Council, General Salim Idris, agreed to work with international governments via the Syrian Support Group in order to secure equipment for his fighters. General Idris also signed the Syrian Support Group's Proclamation of Principles on behalf of the Supreme Military Council.

On 30 April 2013, the Syrian Support Group provided logistics and transport for United States aid to the Free Syrian Army. The aid, which included $8 million in MREs and WALK kits (Warrior Aid and Litter Kits), is currently being distributed from warehouse facilities in northern Aleppo. This aid distribution has expanded into several additional shipments of food and medical supplies, totaling over $10 million.

In July 2013, a Daily Telegraph article reported that the U.S. State Department warned the SSG that any funds it gathered could not be used for weapons. The article reported that this event lead to a decline in SSG's private donations, with the group never having more than $200,000 in its accounts. The article also claimed that in June 2013 the head of the SSG in Washington resigned after the group failed to gain traction with US Government officials. In a publicized rebuttal, SSG denied that such a warning had ever occurred, citing its ongoing relationship with the State Department as the "implementing partner" for aid shipments, as well as Ambassador Robert Ford's letter of appreciation. The SSG also maintained that the support of its donor base had not waned, and in fact this support had led to the organization's hiring of new staff members.

The Daily Telegraph article reported that the group's former European government affairs director, David Falt, alleged that the SSG spent months trying to negotiate deals to sell rights to Syrian oil output worth hundreds of millions of dollars. This effort was reportedly headed by former NATO official Brian Sayers. According to Mazen Asbahi, the president of SSG, the group's board eventually cancelled these attempted oil deals after becoming uncomfortable with them. Additionally, in a letter to the editor of the Daily Telegraph, Sayers denied that oil transactions were intended to benefit the organization itself, stating that SSG explored "using revenues from petroleum" and other materials for the direct benefit of the Free Syrian Army. Sayers also asserted that "forged and fraudulent emails" were used to form the article.

== Funding ==
The Syrian Support Group relied on private donations to support its operations.

== See also ==
- Americans for a Free Syria
- Syrian American Council
- Syrian Emergency Task Force
