= Russia–Syria–Iran–Iraq coalition =

Former joint intelligence-sharing cooperation between opponents of ISIL

Russia–Syria–Iran–Iraq Coalition
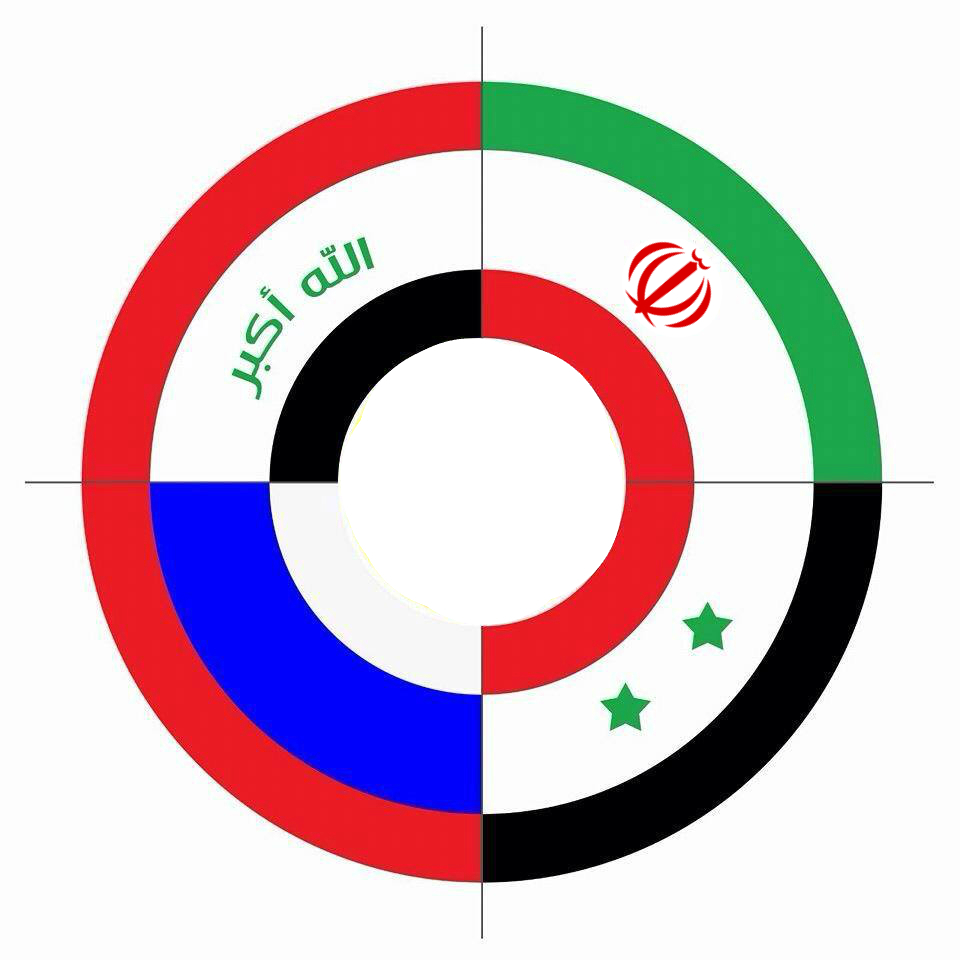

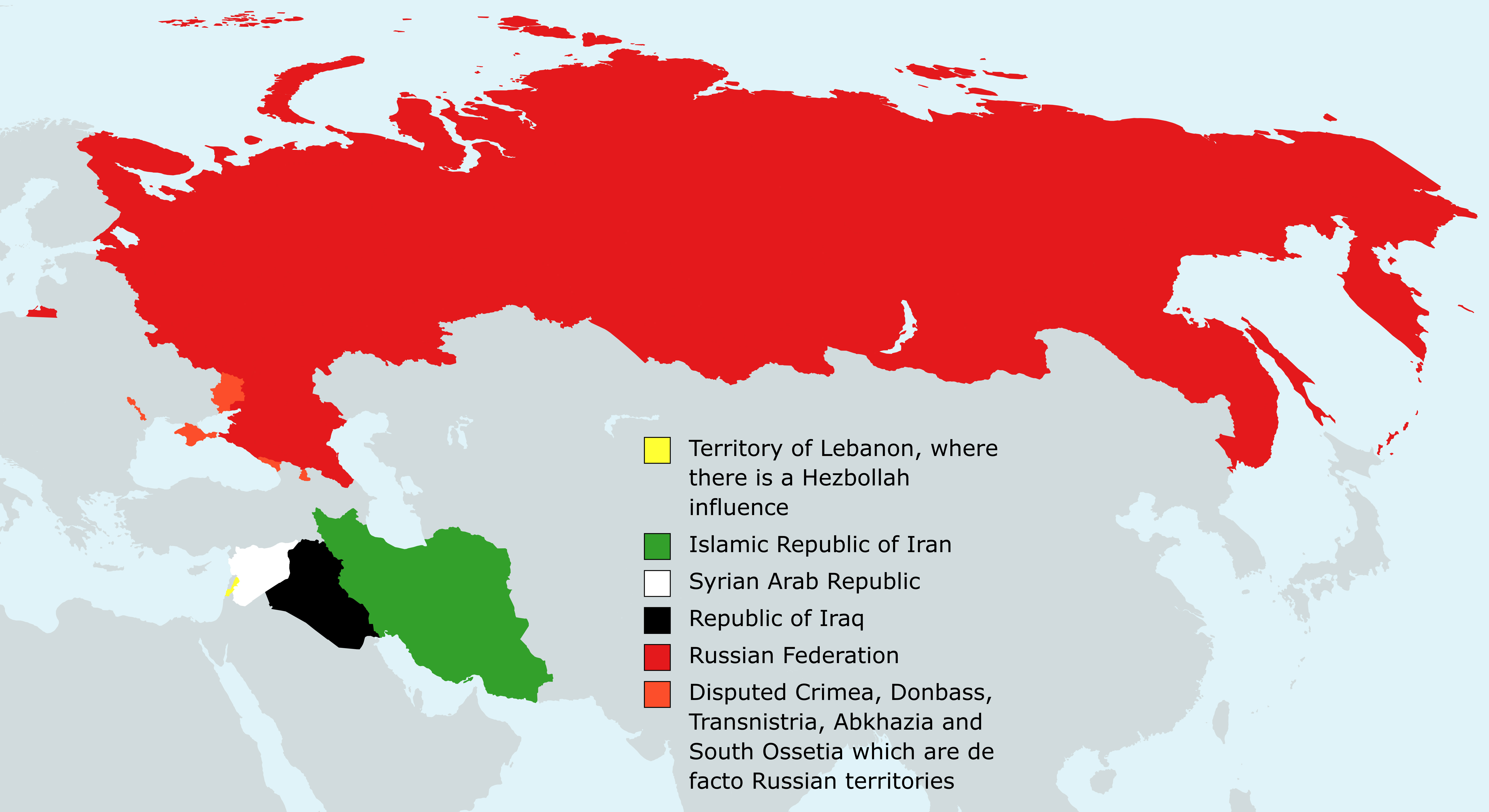
- Members on the map
- Formation: September 2015
- Type: Military alliance
- Purpose: Anti-IS
- Headquarters: Damascus
- Region served: West Asia
- Members: Hezbollah; Iran; Iraq; Russia; Ba'athist Syria
- Affiliations: Axis of Resistance

The Russia–Syria–Iran–Iraq coalition (RSII coalition), also referred to as 4+1 (in which the "plus one" refers to Hezbollah of Lebanon), was a joint intelligence-sharing cooperation between opponents of the Islamic State (IS) with operation rooms in Syria's Damascus and Iraq's Green Zone in Baghdad. It was formed as a consequence of an agreement reached at the end of September 2015 between Russia, Iran, Iraq and the Syrian Arab Republic to "help and cooperate in collecting information about the terrorist Daesh group" (ISIS) with a view to combatting the advances of the group, according to the statement issued by the Iraqi Joint Operations Command. The statement also cited "the increasing concern from Russia about thousands of Russian terrorists committing criminal acts within ISIS."

In October 2015, it was suggested that the Russia–Syria–Iran–Iraq coalition may have been devised during the visit by Qasem Soleimani, commander of the Iranian Quds Force, to Moscow in July 2015. During the early days of the operation, the Russian Air Force were backed by the Syrian Arab Armed Forces, Iranian Islamic Revolutionary Guard Corps, and other allied militias. The United States of America, which has been particularly hostile to the Iranian intervention, Russian military action and Hezbollah's activities in Syria since the start of the civil war, has criticized this coalition.

After the fall of the Assad regime in Syria and the withdrawal of Iran from the country, it is unclear if the alliance is still active as it could possibly be dissolved.

== Background ==
=== Russia and Iran ===
For two and a half decades, the Russian elite were split on Iran. Some, like Russian Prime Minister Dmitry Medvedev, saw Iran as a bargaining chip in possible deals with the Western world. On the other hand, Eurasianists like political analyst Aleksandr Dugin wanted a Russo-Iranian alliance to counter Western influence.

=== Syrian civil war ===
Syria's civil war started when opposing groups in the country protested against Assad's rule in early 2011, the protests ultimately turning violent and drawing-in regional opponents and supporters of Assad. The war is being conducted between numerous opponents and government parties. More than 250,000 people have been killed and more than 10 million displaced. With most opponents, and their western allies, demanding Assad's leaving as a prerequisite for talks, efforts to find a solution have failed thus far. Recently Western countries have said Assad could play some role in a transition. Regarding the transitional period Assad has asserted that it was not western countries' job to decide on Syria's future. He has accused the US and its allies of hypocrisy for their support for insurgents, saying that air raids by Syrian jets, now combined by Russia, have been far more productive than anything performed by the year-long air operations by the US-led coalition. According to Assad the countries involved in US-led coalition, themselves support terrorism, thus they cannot fight terrorism. That is why, he says, several months of fighting against terrorism, has resulted in spreading it.

==== After 2015 ====
After the loss of Idlib province to a rebel offensive in the first half of 2015, the situation was judged by Assad's allies to have become critical for Assad's survival. High level talks were held between Moscow and Tehran in the first half of 2015 and a political agreement was achieved. In October 2015, it was suggested that the Russian operation in Syria may have been devised during the visit by Qasem Soleimani, commander of the Iranian Quds Force, to Moscow in July 2015, which was then denied by Russian officials. Responding to an official request by Syrian government, in September 2015, Russia sent its warplanes and other military hardware and combat troops to Latakia International Airport to be ready for their operation. In 2016, Russia declared it would send humanitarian aid to Aleppo with the help of the Syrian government. Russia also claimed that it would allow civilians to leave the city, and urged the Syrian government to offer the chance for militants to surrender.

The Russian Air Force has used Iranian airbases for refueling namely the Hamadan Airbase.

== Agreement ==
At the end of September 2015, a joint information center in Baghdad was set up by Iran, Iraq, Russia, and Syria to coordinate their operations against ISIL. According to Russian foreign minister Sergey Lavrov's statement made in mid-October 2015, prior to the start of its operations in Syria, Russia invited the U.S. to join the Baghdad-based information center but received what he called an "unconstructive" response. Putin's proposal that the U.S. receive a high-level Russian delegation and that a U.S. delegation arrive in Moscow to discuss co-operation in Syria was likewise declined by the U.S. Following an official request from the Syrian government for martial help against rebel and jihadist groups in Syria, the coalition started its work. It was generally thought that Iran would play a leading role in the ground operations of Syria's army and allies, whilst Russia would be leading in the air in conjunction with the Syrian air force, thereby establishing a complementary role. For Western countries and the Russia–Syria–Iran–Iraq coalition ISIS has been a common enemy, although each country has very different friends and opposing views of how to solve the crisis.

In an interview with Iranian TV, Assad said that the success of this agreement was vital to save the Middle East from destruction. He said that the year-long air campaign by the US-led coalition had been counterproductive and had helped terrorism to spread and win new recruits, but that the new coalition of Russia, Syria, Iran, and Iraq, could achieve real results.

== Iranian role ==
Other than being a crucial thoroughfare to Hezbollah in Lebanon, Syria has been the only consistent ally for Iran since the 1979 Islamic revolution in Iran. Iran has provided significant support for the Syrian government in the Syrian civil war, including logistical, technical and financial support. In April 2014, Hossein Amir-Abdolahian, the Iranian deputy foreign minister, said: "We aren't seeking to have Bashar Assad remain president for life. But we do not subscribe to the idea of using extremist forces and terrorism to topple Assad and the Syrian government." On 24 July General Qasem Soleimani visited Moscow to devise the details of the plan for coordinated military action in Syria. In October 2015, it was suggested that the Russia–Syria–Iran–Iraq coalition may have been devised during his visit.

Citing two Lebanese sources, Reuters reported on 1 October 2015 that hundreds of Iranian troops arrived in Syria over the previous 10 days and would soon join Syrian government forces and their Lebanese Hezbollah allies in a major ground offensive backed by Russian airstrikes. Iran has also been training the Popular Mobilization Forces who are fighting ISIS.

== See also ==
- Foreign involvement in the Syrian civil war
- Iran–Israel proxy conflict
- Iran–Israel conflict during the Syrian civil war
- Iran–Saudi Arabia proxy conflict
- Axis of Resistance
