= Americans for a Free Syria =

Americans for a Free Syria is a nonpartisan American nonprofit organization that campaigns for human rights in Syria and advocates for humane treatment of Syrian refugees.

This organization often coordinates with Syrian Emergency Task Force and Syrian American Council.

== Supported legislation ==
Americans for Free Syria promotes US bills: Caesar Syria Civilian Protection Act, No Assistance for Assad Act and Stop UN Support for Assad Act. These bills intend to impose further financial restrictions on the Assad regime for committing war crimes against the Syrian civilian population.

This organization considers sanctions of Caesar Syria Civilian Protection Act of 2019 as a way of bringing a form of accountability to Assad's regime.
