= Iranian intervention in the Syrian civil war =

- Part of foreign involvement in the Syrian civil war and the Iran–Saudi Arabia proxy conflict
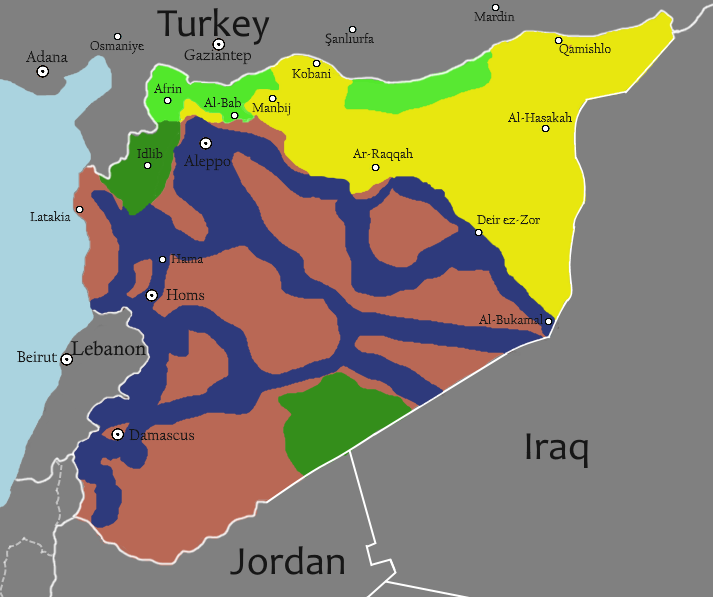
- Iranian and Hezbollah's (marked in blue) military presence and influence in Syria in December 2020
Date	9 June 2013 – 6 December 2024 (11 years, 5 months, 3 weeks and 6 days)
Location	Syria and Lebanon
Result	Syrian opposition victory

Belligerents
Islamic Republic of Iran; Islamic Revolutionary Guard Corps; Quds Force; Basij; Aerospace Force; Army; Ground Forces; Air Force; Iran-backed militias: Hezbollah; Syrian Hezbollah; Liwa Fatemiyoun; Liwa Zainabiyoun; Hüseynçilər; Hashemiyoun; PMF; Harakat Hezbollah al-Nujaba; In support of: (Syria) Syrian Arab Republic; Syrian Arab Armed Forces; Supported by: Russia (airstrikes); Russian Armed Forces; Russian Air Force	Syrian Salvation Government: Hay'at Tahrir al-Sham (HTS); Ajnad al-Sham (2013–17); Jaysh al-Sunna (2013–17); Islamic Front: Ahrar al-Sham; Jaysh al-Islam; Supported by: Qatar; Saudi Arabia (2013–18); (Syrian opposition) Syrian Interim Government: (Syrian opposition) Free Syrian Army; (Syrian opposition) Syrian National Army (2017–present); Supported by: Turkey; United States (2013–17); United Kingdom (2013–17)	Al-Qaeda: Al-Nusra Front (2013–17); Turkistan Islamic Party; Hurras al-Din; Islamic State	Syrian Democratic Forces: YPG; YPJ; Iraqi Kurdistan (limited involvement) Supported by: CJTF-OIR (2014–present): United States; Canada; United Kingdom; France; Netherlands

Commanders and leaders
Ali Khamenei (Supreme Leader of Iran); Qasem Soleimani (until 2020) (Quds Force chief commander); Dariush Dorosti † (IRGC commander); Abolghassem Zahiri (WIA) (102nd Imam Hossein Battalion commander); Ahmad Gholami † (Iranian paramilitary commander); Razi Mousavi † (IRGC commander)	Ahmed al-Sharaa (Emir of Hay'at Tahrir al-Sham); Abu Jaber Sheikh (Head of HTS Shura Council); Zahran Alloush † (Military Chief of Islamic Front); Hassan Aboud † (Political Chief of Islamic Front); Hassan Soufan (Commander of Ahrar al-Sham) (Syrian opposition) Riad al-Asaad (Founder of FSA) (Syrian opposition) Salim Idris (Chief of Staff of SMC) (Syrian opposition) Hassan Hamada (Chief of Staff of SNA)	Abu Khayr al-Masri † (al-Qaeda deputy leader); Abu Hajer al-Homsi (al-Nusra Front top military commander); Abu Humam al-Shami (al-Nusra Front military chief); Khalid al-Aruri (Hurras al-Din leader) (Islamic State) Abu Bakr al-Baghdadi † (Founder of ISIL)	Zoran Birhat (YPJ senior commander) (Democratic Autonomous Administration of North and East Syria) Ciwan Ibrahim (Asayish head)

Strength
(Iran) 15,000+ troops (2015): 2,000 Quds Force officers (2021); 14,000+ fighters (2017) (Hezbollah) 10,000+ fighters (2017) c. 2,000 al-Nujaba fighters (Russia) 120+ Naval Infantry advisors, several BMPs	Unknown	Unknown	Unknown

Casualties and losses
10,600+ killed: 2,300+ killed; 2,000+ killed; (Hezbollah) 1,800+ killed; Iraqi Shia Militia: 1,308+ militiamen killed	Unknown	Unknown	Unknown

From the 2000s until the fall of the Assad regime, the Islamic Republic of Iran and the Syrian Arab Republic were close strategic allies, and Iran provided significant support for the Syrian Ba'athist government in the Syrian civil war, including logistical, technical and financial support, as well as training and combat troops. Iran saw the survival of the Assad regime as being crucial to its regional interests. When the uprising developed into the Syrian civil war, there were increasing reports of Iranian military support, and of Iranian training of the National Defence Forces both in Syria and Iran. From late 2011 and early 2012, Iran's IRGC sent tens of thousands of Iranian troops and Shi'ite foreign paramilitary volunteers in coordination with the Syrian government to prevent the collapse of the regime; thereby polarizing the conflict along sectarian lines.

Iranian security and intelligence services advised and assisted the Syrian military in order to preserve the erstwhile Syrian President Bashar al-Assad's hold on power. Those efforts included training, technical support, and combat troops. Estimates of the number of Iranian personnel in Syria ranged from hundreds to tens of thousands. Iranian government backed Shia Hezbollah fighters, had taken direct combat roles from 2012 until 2024. From the summer of 2013, Iran and Hezbollah provided important battlefield support for Assad, allowing it to make advances on the opposition.

In 2014, coinciding with the peace talks at Geneva II, Iran stepped up support for Assad. Estimates of financial assistance rendered by Iran to the Ba'athist Syrian government ranged from tens to hundreds of billions of dollars. Tehran's objectives included Shi'ification attempts through forced conversions, Shia missionary activities, establishment of shrines and demographic transformations by bringing in foreign Twelver Shia settlers in regime-controlled territories.

Iranian troops and allied militias on the ground were supported by ballistic missiles and air forces, including armed drones utilizing smart munitions. By October 2018, Iranian drones had launched over 700 strikes on Islamic State forces alone. At the height of its intervention in 2015–18, an estimated 10,000 IRGC forces and 5,000 Iranian Army members were stationed in Syria alongside tens of thousands of Iranian-led foreign militias. In 2018, 2,000 officers of the Quds Forces commanded an estimated 131 military garrisons and tens of thousands of Iran-backed Shia jihadists across regime-controlled regions. During 2020, Unit 840 played a role in supporting the Assad regime during the Syrian conflict. Their involvement includes training pro-government militias, providing strategic guidance, and establishing a military presence near the Israeli border. This positioning aims to create a strategic advantage against Israel and to support Hezbollah's operations in the region. In 2023, Iran maintained 55 military bases in Syria and 515 other military points, the majority in Aleppo and Deir Ezzor governorates and the Damascus suburbs; these were 70% of the foreign military sites in the country. On December 6, 2024, after severe military setbacks due to a series of rebel offensives, Iran and its proxies withdrew from Syria.

== Background ==
Iran saw the survival of the Syrian government as being crucial to its interest. Its only consistent ally since the 1979 Islamic revolution, Syria provided a crucial route to supply arms for Hezbollah in Lebanon. IRGC presence in Syria had boasted Syria as being Iran's major geopolitical ally, in addition to viewing Bashar al-Assad's Alawite dominated Ba'athist government as a crucial buffer against the influence of Saudi Arabia and the United States.

The Syrian city of Zabadani was vitally important to Assad and to Iran because, at least as late as June 2011, the city served as the Islamic Revolutionary Guard Corps's logistical hub for supplying Hezbollah in neighboring Lebanon. Prior to the civil war, Iran had between 2,000-3,000 IRGC officers stationed in Syria, who helped to train local troops and manage supply routes of arms and money to Hezbollah.

In April 2014, Hossein Amir-Abdollahian, Iranian deputy foreign minister said, "We aren't seeking to have Bashar al-Assad remain president for life. But we do not subscribe to the idea of using extremist forces and terrorism to topple Assad and the Syrian government". Using its increased leverage during the civil war, Iranian government had been recruiting Alawites by setting up Khomeinist religious centers to convert them to Twelver Shi'ism. It had also been attempting demographic shifts by bringing in foreign Shia settlers and families of IRGC soldiers across Syria.

== Timeline ==
=== 2011 ===
In the civil uprising phase of the Syrian civil war, Iran was said to be providing Syria with technical support, based on Iran's capabilities developed following the 2009–2010 Iranian election protests.

In April 2011 U.S. President Barack Obama and U.S. Ambassador to the United Nations Susan Rice accused Iran of secretly aiding Assad in his efforts to quell the protests, and there were reports of Syrian protesters hearing security-force members speaking Persian.

The Guardian reported in May 2011 that the Iranian government was assisting the Syrian government with riot control equipment and intelligence monitoring techniques. According to US journalist Geneive Abdo writing in September 2011, the Iranian government provided the Syrian government with technology to monitor e-mail, cell phones and social media. Iran developed these capabilities in the wake of the 2009 protests and spent millions of dollars establishing a "cyber army" to track down dissidents online. Iran's monitoring technology is believed to be among the most sophisticated in the world, perhaps only second to China.

=== 2012 ===
In May 2012, in an interview with the Iranian Students News Agency which was later removed from its website, the deputy head of Iran's Quds Force said that it had provided combat troops to support Syrian military operations. It was alleged by the Western media that Iran also trained fighters from Hezbollah, a Shia militant group based in Lebanon. Iraq, located between Syria and Iran, was criticized by the U.S. for allowing Iran to ship military supplies to Assad over Iraqi airspace.

Haaretz said that Iran had, by February 2012, sent the Syrian government more than $1 billion to help it withstand international sanctions. It has also shipped fuel to the country and sent two warships to a Syrian port in a display of power and support.

In March 2012, anonymous U.S. intelligence officials claimed a spike in Iranian-supplied arms and other aid for the Syrian government. Iranian security officials also allegedly traveled to Damascus to help deliver this assistance. A second senior U.S. official said members of Iran's main intelligence service, the Ministry of Intelligence and Security, were assisting Syrian counterparts in charge of the crackdown.

According to a U.N. panel in May 2012, Iran supplied the Syrian government with arms during the previous year despite a ban on weapons exports by the Islamic Republic. Turkish authorities captured crates and a truck in February 2012, including assault rifles, machine guns, explosives, detonators, 60 mm and 120 mm mortar shells as well as other items on its border. It was believed these were destined for the Syrian government. The confidential report leaked just hours after an article appeared in The Washington Post revealing how Syrian opposition fighters started to receive more, and better, weapons in an effort paid for by Persian Gulf Arab states and co-ordinated partly by the US. The report investigated three large illegal shipments of Iranian weapons over the past year and stated "Iran has continued to defy the international community through illegal arms shipments. Two of these cases involved [Syria], as were the majority of cases inspected by the Panel during its previous mandate, underscoring that Syria continues to be the central party to illicit Iranian arms transfers." More anonymous sources were cited by the UN in May 2012, as it claimed arms were moving both ways between Lebanon and Syria, and alleged weapons brought in from Lebanon were being used to arm the opposition. The alleged spike in Iranian arms was likely a response to a looming influx of weapons and ammunition to the rebels from Gulf states that had been reported shortly before.

On 24 July 2012, Islamic Revolutionary Guards Corp commander Massoud Jazayeri said Iranians would not allow enemy plans to change Syria's political system to succeed.

In August 2012, Leon Panetta accused Iran of setting up a pro-Government militia to fight in Syria, and chairman of the joint chiefs of staff General Martin Dempsey compared it to the Mahdi Army of Iraqi Shia leader Muqtada al-Sadr. Panetta said that there was evidence that the Iranian Revolutionary Guards were attempting to "train a militia within Syria to be able to fight on behalf of the regime". 48 Iranians were captured by the FSA in Damascus, and U.S. officials said that the men who were captured were "active-duty Iranian Revolutionary Guard members".

In September 2012, Western intelligence officials stated that Iran had sent 150 senior members of the Iranian Revolutionary Guards to preserve the Assad government, and had also sent hundreds of tons of military equipment (among them guns, rockets, and shells) to the Assad government via an air corridor that Syria and Iran jointly established. These officials believed that the intensification of Iranian support had led to increased effectiveness against the Free Syrian Army by the Assad government.

According to rebel soldiers speaking in October 2012, Iranian unmanned aerial vehicles had been used to guide Syrian military planes and gunners to bombard rebel positions. CNN reported that the UAV or drones—which the rebels refer to as "wizwayzi" were "easily visible from the ground and seen in video shot by rebel fighters".

Rebels have displayed captured aircraft they describe as Iranian-built drones — brightly colored, pilotless jets. They're accompanied by training manuals emblazoned with the image of Iran's revolutionary leader, the late Ayatollah Ruhollah Khomeini.

=== 2013 ===
In January 2013, a prisoner swap took place between the Syrian Rebels and the Syrian Government authorities. According to reports, 48 Iranians were released by the Rebels in exchange for nearly 2,130 prisoners held by the Syrian Government. Rebels claimed the captives were linked to the IRGC. US State Department spokeswoman Victoria Nuland described the Iranians as "members of the Iranian Revolutionary Guard," calling it "just another example of how Iran continues to provide guidance, expertise, personnel, technical capabilities to the Syrian regime."

Iran decided in June 2013 to send 4,000 troops to aid the Syrian government forces, described as a "first contingent" by Robert Fisk of The Independent, who added that the move underscored a Sunni vs. Shiite alignment in the Middle East. IRGC soldiers, along with fellow Shi'ite forces from Hezbollah and members of Iran's Basij militia participated in the capture of Qusair from rebel forces on 9 June 2013. In 2014, Iran increased its deployment of IRGC in Syria. Iran also proposed to open a new Syrian front against Israel in the Golan Heights, this coming a day after Egyptian President cut off diplomatic relations with Syria and demanded that Iran support for the pro Syrian-government Hezbollah end. A Syrian official called the severing of relations by Morsi "irresponsible" and said it was part of a move by the U.S. and Israel to exacerbate divisions in the region.

According to American officials questioned by journalist Dexter Filkins, officers from the Quds force have "coordinated attacks, trained militias, and set up an elaborate system to monitor rebel communications" in Syria from late 2012 to 2013. With help from the Hezbollah, and under the leadership of Quds Force general Qasem Soleimani, the Assad government won back strategic territory from rebels in 2013, in particular an important supply route during the Al-Qusayr offensive in April and May.

In the fall of 2013 Iranian Brigadier General Mohammad Jamali-Paqaleh of the Revolutionary Guards was killed in Syria, while volunteering to defend a Shia shrine. In February, General Hassan Shateri, also of the Revolutionary Guards, had been killed while travelling from Beirut to Damascus.

=== 2014 ===
Iran has stepped up support on the ground for Syrian President Assad, providing hundreds more military specialists to gather intelligence and train troops. This further backing from Tehran, along with deliveries of munitions and equipment from Moscow, is helping to keep Assad in power. This surge of support was in part a decision strongly promoted by Qasem Soleimani, the head of the Quds force, to exploit the outbreak of infighting between rebel fighters and the al-Qaeda inspired Islamic State of Iraq and Syria (ISIS).

A former Iranian Revolutionary Guard forces commander said that "top Quds force commanders were tasked with advising and training Assad's military and his commanders", adding that "Revolutionary Guards directed the fighting on the instructions of the Quds Force commanders". In addition there are thousands of Iranian paramilitary Basij volunteer fighters as well as Shi'ites from Iraq. Former Iranian officials and a Syrian opposition source also put the count of those auxiliary forces in the thousands.

A Syrian opposition source said in recent months Iranian led forces had begun operating in coastal areas including Tartous and Latakia. They have local ID cards, wear Syrian military fatigues and work with the elite Syrian Air Force intelligence unit.

=== 2015 ===
The Wall Street Journal reported on 2 October 2015 that Iran's Revolutionary Guard (the IRGC) has had some 7,000 IRGC members and Iranian paramilitary volunteers operating in Syria and was planning to expand its presence in the country through local fighters and proxies. The Journal also reported that some experts estimate 20,000 Shiite foreign fighters are on the ground, backed by both Shiite Iran and Hezbollah.

At least 121 IRGC troops, including several commanders, have been killed in the Syrian Civil War since it began.

Key victories were achieved with substantial support provided by the Quds force, namely the al-Ghab plains battles, Aleppo offensives, Dara'aya offensives of 2015 and the al-Qusayr offensives which established government and Hezbollah control over the northern Qalamoun region and the border crossings from Lebanon to Syria. In June 2015, some reports suggested that the Iranian military were effectively in charge of the Syrian government troops on the battlefield.

After the loss of Idlib province to a rebel offensive in the first half of 2015, the situation was judged to have become critical for Assad's survival. High level talks were held between Moscow and Tehran in the first half of 2015 and a political agreement was achieved. On 24 July General Qasem Soleimani visited Moscow to devise the details of the plan for coordinated military action in Syria.

In mid-September 2015, the first reports of new detachments from the Iranian revolutionary guards arriving in Tartus and Latakia in west Syria were made. With much of the Syrian Arab Army and National Defence Forces units deployed to more volatile fronts, the Russian Marines and Iranian Revolutionary Guard (IRG) have relieved their positions by installing military checkpoints inside the cities of Slunfeh (east Latakia Governorate), Masyaf (East Tartus Governorate) and Ras al-Bassit (Latakia coastal city). There were also further reports of new Iranian contingents being deployed to Syria in early October 2015.

On 1 October 2015, citing two Lebanese sources, Reuters reported that hundreds of Iranian troops had arrived in Syria over the previous 10 days to join Syrian government forces and their Lebanese Hezbollah allies in a major ground offensive backed by Russian air strikes that started on 30 September 2015 and were welcomed as vital by Bashar al-Assad.

On 8 October 2015, brigadier general Hossein Hamadani, the deputy to General Qasem Soleimani in Syria was killed. On 12 October, two more senior commanders of the Iranian Revolutionary Guard Corps, Hamid Mokhtarband and Farshad Hassounizadeh, were reported by Iranian media to have been killed in Syria.

At the end of October 2015, Iran agreed to take part in the Syria peace talks in Vienna. The talks for the first time brought Iran to the negotiating table with Saudi Arabia, which are said to be engaged in a proxy war in Syria. The talks however were promptly followed by an exchange of sharp rebukes between Iran's and Saudi Arabia's top officials that cast doubt on Iran's future participation in those.

=== 2016 ===
In November 2016, Iranian government announced the deaths of over a thousand of its military troops deployed to Syria, a rapid spike from the 400 deaths announced a few months earlier.

=== 2017 ===
In June 2017, Iran attacked militants' targets in the Deir Ezzor area in eastern Syria with ballistic missiles fired from western Iran. As a result of these attacks (in an operation which was named as the missile operation of "Laylat al-Qadr"), more than 170 forces of ISIS among a number of its commanders were killed.

=== 2018 ===
The Supreme leader of Iran Ali Khamenei in a meeting with Syrian Islamic scholars, six years before the Fall of the Assad regime (3 March 2018)

In May 2018, Iranian Quds forces based in Syria launched a 20 rockets attack on Israel. None of the rockets hit any targets and Israeli aircraft responded by extensively hitting both Syrian and Iranian military sites in Syria.

=== 2019 ===
In January 2019, the Israel Defense Forces confirmed that it had carried out strikes against Iranian military targets in Syria several hours after a rocket was intercepted over the Golan Heights. The Israeli military claimed in a statement that Quds Force positions were targeted and included a warning to the Syrian military against "attempting to harm Israeli forces or territory."

=== 2020 ===
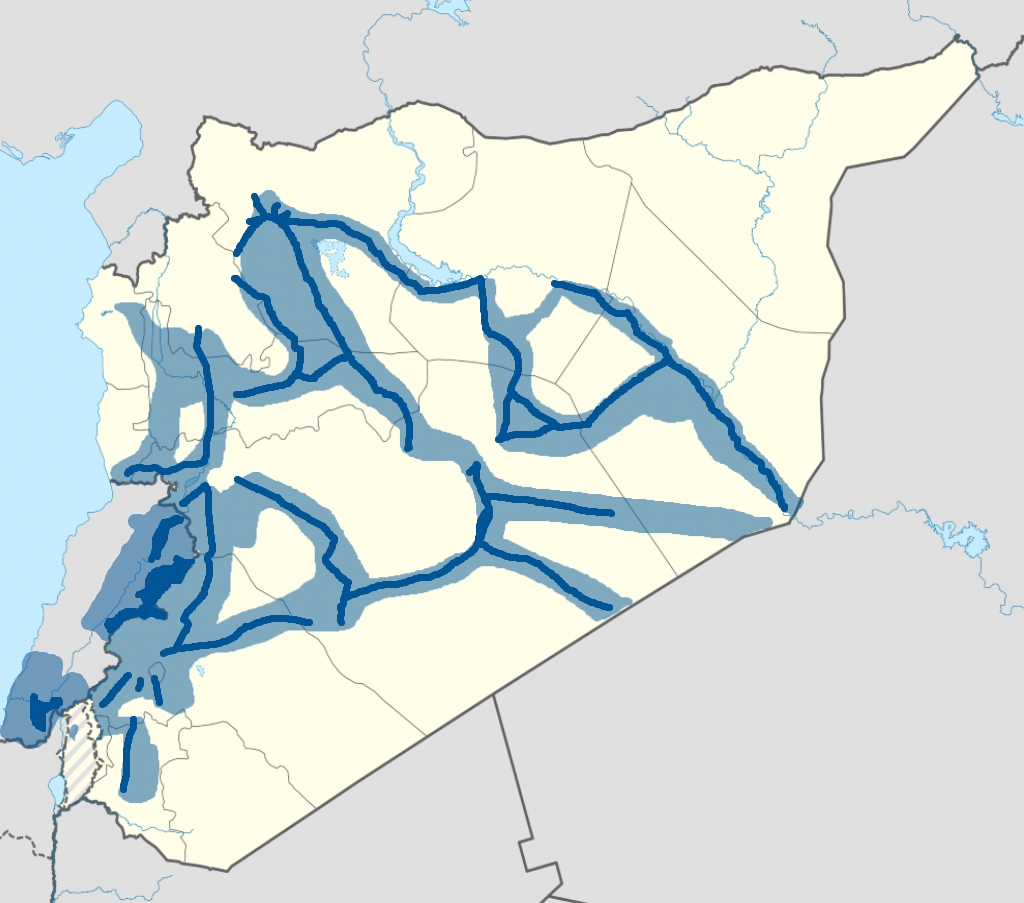
Map depicting the extent of Iranian control across various regions of Syria and Lebanon in 2021

Between 27 February and 3 March, 4 Iranians were killed by Turkish forces. On 7 March, an IRGC commander, Farhad Dabirian, was reported to be killed a day earlier in the Sayyidah Zaynab neighborhood in Damascus, without giving details on the circumstances of his death. On 18 March, it was announced that an Iranian commander, Mehran Azizani, was killed by Jabhat al-Nusra in Syria. On 15 May, it was announced that another commander, Abu al-Fadl Sarlak, was killed, probably by an Israeli airstrike in Khanasir.

=== 2021 ===
After a year of cease-fire deals and emergence of a frozen conflict, many high-ranking members of the Ba'athist leadership like Maher al-Assad and First Lady Asma al-Assad has been seeking the end of Iranian military presence and demanding the withdrawal of Shia militias. This was part of their reconciliation plan with other Arab countries of the region. Head of IRGC in Syria, Javad Ghaffari, was dismissed by Bashar al-Assad in November 2021 to curtail Iranian influence in regime-held territories; demonstrating growing resentment within government circles over continued Iranian presence.

=== 2024 ===
On 6 December, amid the collapse of Syrian government forces due to the rebel offensive launched in late November, the Iranian government began evacuating military commanders and personnel from Syria. Among those evacuated included several Quds Forces commanders, IRGC members, diplomatic staff and their families as well as Iranian citizens. Flights to Tehran, as well as land routes to Lebanon, Iraq and the port of Latakia were being utilized to transport the outgoing Iranians from the country.

== Public opinion ==
The fierce insistence of Iran's ruling clerics to engage actively in the Syrian crisis is driven by a sectarian strategy which depicts the conflict as a "religious war", despite the considerable doctrinal differences between the Alawites and the Twelver Shiites and the traditional Arab nationalist and secular orientation of the ruling Baathist party.. Although the Assad government has enjoyed a political alliance with ruling clerics in Iran from the time of its establishment, this alliance is not driven by any common religious/sectarian causes; the Ba'athist regime in Syria does not participate in Iranian religious issues, and the Ayatollah in Iran do not consider Assad a Shia partner.

In a March 2018 ORB International poll of 1,011 adults across all of Syria's 14 governorates, 64% of Syrians said that Iran's influence on their country was "negative only", while 32% replied Iran's influence was "positive only". Various factions of the Assad regime and many Ba'ath party supporters have also demanded the withdrawal of Hezbollah and other Iran-backed Khomeinist militant groups from Syria.

== Casualties ==
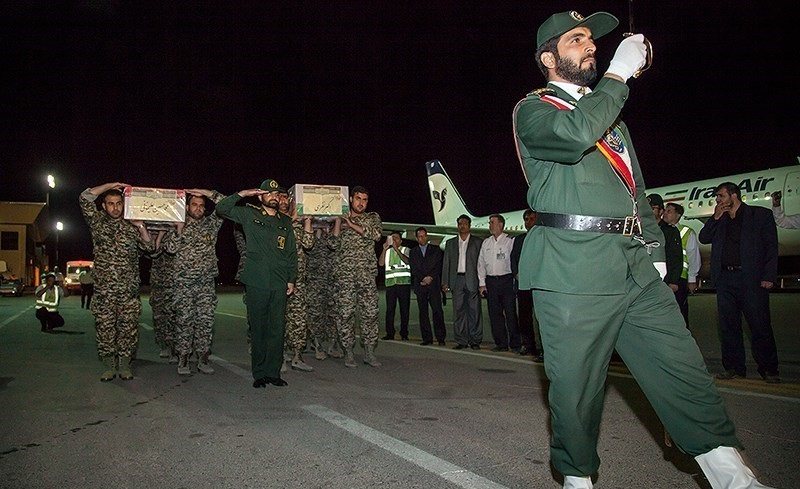
Iranian casualties bodies return to Kermanshah, August 2016

Despite Iran's costly presence in Syria, public support for military involvement in Syria was strong among the Iranian population because of religious motivations and security concerns. From January 2013 to March 2017, the Islamic Revolutionary Guard Corps lost 2,100 soldiers in Syria and 7,000 wounded, according to Iran's veterans' affairs office. These included 418 ranking officers and several generals. In August 2017, Brigadier General Hamid Abazari stated that 25% of the soldiers that Iran had sent to Syria had been killed or wounded, implying several tens of thousands had served. In March 2019, IRGC officer and strategist Hassan Abbasi stated that 2,300 Iranians "went to Syria where they were martyred in recent years." Ali Alfoneh of The Washington Institute for Near East Policy documented a minimum of 559 Iranian combat fatalities as of early 2018 based on surveying funeral services in Iran.

Thousands of Iranian-backed Afghan, Lebanese, Iraqi, Yemeni, Pakistani and other militia fighters have also been killed after joining IRGC-sponsored paramilitary organizations. SOHR estimated a total of 10,600 Iranians or Iranian-led foreign militia had been killed in Syria by early 2024. The Afghans are recruited largely from Hazara refugees in Iran, and some had combat experience before joining; their relation to the Iranian military is only vaguely acknowledged and sometimes denied, despite the troops being uniformed fighters led by IRGC officers, trained and equipped in Iran, with state funerals involving uniformed IRGC personnel. Among the dead were 2,000+ Afghans and at least 160 Pakistanis. Officially, the Afghan paramilitaries were part of the independent Liwa Fatemiyoun group, while the Pakistanis were part of the Liwa Zainabiyoun group. These militias incurred heavy losses, with Liwa Fatemiyoun alone reporting over 10,000 casualties (2,000+ killed, 8,000+ wounded) by January 2018 all over Syria.

=== Notable officer deaths ===
==== Iran ====
Name	Rank and affiliation	Date	Place
Qodratollah Mansouri	Brigadier general, Islamic Revolutionary Guard Corps	15 December 2018	Syria–Iraq border
Shahrokh Daipour	Brigadier general, Islamic Revolutionary Guard Corps	17 June 2018	Albu Kamal District, Syria
Mohsen Hojaji	Third lieutenant, Islamic Revolutionary Guard Corps	9 August 2017	Al Waleed border crossing, Syria
Ahmad Gholami	Brigadier general, Islamic Revolutionary Guard Corps	30 August 2016	Aleppo, Syria
Mohsen Ghitaslou	First lieutenant, 65th Airborne Special Forces Brigade	11 April 2016	Syria
Mohsen Qajarian	Brigadier general, 1st Reza Armored Brigade	3 February 2016	Abu Kamal District, Syria
Abdolreza Mojiri	Brigadier general, Islamic Revolutionary Guard Corps	29 November 2015	Aleppo, Syria
Reza Khavari	Brigadier general, Islamic Revolutionary Guard Corps	23 October 2015	Hama, Syria
Hossein Hamadani	Major general, Islamic Revolutionary Guard Corps	7 October 2015	Aleppo, Syria
Abdul Karim Ghobash	Brigadier general, Islamic Revolutionary Guard Corps	18 January 2015	Al-Zabadani, Syria
Mohammad Ali Allahdadi	Brigadier general, Islamic Revolutionary Guard Corps	18 January 2015	Quneitra province, Syria
Hamid Taqavi	Brigadier general, Islamic Revolutionary Guard Corps	27 December 2014	Samara, Iraq
Jabbar Darisawi	Brigadier general, Islamic Revolutionary Guard Corps	14 October 2014	Damascus Governorate, Syria
Abdullah Eskandari	Brigadier general, Islamic Revolutionary Guard Corps	May 2014	Damascus Governorate, Syria
Mohammad Jamali-Paqaleh	Brigadier general, Islamic Revolutionary Guard Corps	November 2013	Syria
Hassan Shateri	Major general, Islamic Revolutionary Guard Corps	12 February 2013	Syria
Farhad Dabirian	Commander, Islamic Revolutionary Guard Corps	6 March 2020	Syria
Razi Mousavi	Brigadier general, Islamic Revolutionary Guard Corps	25 December 2023	Sayyidah Zaynab, Rif Dimashq, Syria
Sadegh Omidzadeh	General, Islamic Revolutionary Guard Corps	20 January 2024	Mezzeh, Damascus, Syria
Mohammad Reza Zahedi	Commander of Quds Force in Syria and Lebanon	1 April 2024	Damascus, Syria
Kioumars Pourhashemi	Brigadier general, Islamic Revolutionary Guard Corps	24 November 2024	Aleppo, Syria

==== Afghanistan ====
Name	Rank/Affiliation	Date	Place
Ali Reza Tavassoli	Afghan Shia commander of Fatemiyoun Brigade	28 February 2015	Daraa, Syria

== See also ==
- Russian intervention in the Syrian civil war
- Hezbollah involvement in the Syrian civil war
- Iran and the Islamic State
- Iran–Syria relations
- Iranian involvement in the Iraq War
- Russia–Syria–Iran–Iraq coalition
- Foreign involvement in the Syrian civil war
- Iranian intervention in Sudan (2023–present)
