= Mustafa Al-Sheikh =

Syrian Military Officer

Mustafa Ahmad al-Sheikh
- مصطفى أحمد الشيخ
- Born: 2 June 1957 (age 69); Atme, Idlib Governorate, Second Syrian Republic
- Children: 4
- Military career
- Allegiance: Ba'athist Syria (1979–2011); Syrian opposition (2012)
- Branch: Syrian Army (1979–2011); Free Syrian Army (March–December 2012)
- Service years: 1979–2012
- Rank: Brigadier general
- Commands: Head of the Higher Military Council (February–December 2012)
- Conflicts: Lebanese Civil War; Syrian intervention; 1982 Lebanon War; Syrian Civil War

Mustafa Ahmad al-Sheikh (Arabic: مصطفى أحمد الشيخ) is a Syrian former military officer and rebel commander who was the founder and head of the Free Syrian Army's Higher Military Council in 2012, during the Syrian Civil War. He was a brigadier general in the Syrian Army prior to his defection in December 2011.

== Biography ==
=== Early life and service in the Syrian Army ===
Mustafa Ahmad al-Sheikh was born in the village of Atme, in the Idlib Governorate in northwestern Syria, on 2 June 1957. In 1976, Sheikh joined a Syrian Armed Forces military academy and graduated in 1979 with the rank of lieutenant. He served in the Syrian Army as a battalion commander, and was a member of the Arab Deterrent Force in Tripoli, Lebanon between 1979 and 1983. Following the end of the ADF's mandate in Lebanon, Sheikh was transferred to the Syrian Army's northern command as a security officer, a position he maintained until his defection in December 2011.

=== Defection and rebel commander ===
On 16 December 2011, Brigadier General Mustafa al-Sheikh, along with his brother, secretary of the Arab Socialist Ba'ath Party – Syria Region in the Idlib Governorate, and his son, a lieutenant in the army, defected from the Syrian government. On 6 January 2012, Sheikh announced his defection in a televised statement on Al Jazeera.

In an interview in February 2012, Mustafa al-Sheikh said he battled with his conscience before defecting, mindful of his 37 years of service in the Syrian Army and of possible retribution against his extended family. He said the final straw had been a sexual assault by soldiers who took turns raping a young bride in a village near Hama.

On 5 February 2012, Mustafa al-Sheikh announced the formation of the Supreme Revolutionary Military Council for the Liberation of Syria. This move was condemned by the Free Syrian Army. Colonel Riad al-Asaad, commander of the FSA, rejected Sheikh's formation and stated that Sheikh "represents himself. He has nothing to do with the Free Syrian Army." Malik al-Kurdi, a deputy commander in the FSA, called Sheikh's announcement "a knife in the back of the revolution". Bassma Kodmani, spokeswomen of the Syrian National Council, stated that the SNC was "wary" of Sheikh's announcement, and acknowledged tensions between Sheikh and the FSA. Lama al-Atassi, a Syrian opposition figure affiliated with the FSA, also condemned Sheikh's announcement.

Despite his previous disputes with the FSA and Col. Riad al-Asaad, Sheikh and Asaad jointly announced the formation of the Higher Military Council, under the leadership of the Free Syrian Army, on 24 March 2012. Previously based in Turkey, Asaad and Sheikh moved the FSA's headquarters to rebel-held areas in northwestern Syria in late September 2012.

Al-Sheikh stated that "We want very urgent intervention, outside of the security council due to the Russian veto. We want a coalition similar to what happened in Kosovo and the Ivory Coast." On 26 May 2012, al-Sheikh said government opponents had lost all faith in the United Nations Security Council, on which Damascus has Russia as a powerful backer. In another interview in November 2012, Sheikh warned "If there’s no quick decision to support us, we will all turn into terrorists."

Sheikh opposes the Muslim Brotherhood of Syria. He was not present during a meeting of rebel leaders, most of them Sunni Islamists, in December 2012 in Antalya. The meeting established the Supreme Military Council, and Brig. Gen. Salim Idris was appointed as its chief of staff.

=== Post-military activities ===
In November 2013, it was reported that al-Sheikh and his son had applied for political asylum in Sweden.

In January 2017, Mustafa al-Sheikh visited Moscow and met Mihhail Bogdanov, the deputy foreign minister of Russia. Sheikh praised the Russian military intervention in Syria, saying that "The intervention of Russia is different from the intervention of the rest of parties involved [that] have other agendas. Russia is a great nation and doesn't need to occupy Syria", and "Aleppo became safe haven. I personally hope that [Russia] enters, in the same way it did Aleppo, all other regions [in Syria]." His visit and statements in Russia were condemned by other former FSA commanders, including Col. Hassan Hamada. Riad al-Asaad once again denounced Sheikh and claimed that they were enemies from the start, accusing Sheikh of being an agent for the Syrian government.

Khaled al-Halabi, another brigadier general in the Syrian Army who served between 2009 and 2013, was granted asylum in Austria with assistance from Mossad in 2015 despite his record of war crimes and crimes against humanity including torture and sexual violence. Al-Sheikh, who described al-Halabi as his "best friend", denied these charges and defended al-Halabi as "one of the best people in the Syrian revolution".

== See also ==
- Free Syrian Army
