= Mohammad Jamali-Paqaleh =

Iranian military officer

- محمد جمالی پاقلعه
- Born: 1963; Paqaleh, Kerman, Iran
- Died: 2013 (aged 49–50); Damascus, Syria
- Burial place: Kerman, Iran
- Military career
- Allegiance: Iran
- Branch: IRGC
- Rank: Brigadier general
- Units: 41st Sarallah Division of Kerman; Quds Force
- Conflicts: Iran–Iraq War; Syrian Civil War †

Brigadier general Mohammad Jamali-Paqaleh (Persian: محمد جمالی پاقلعه; 1963–2013) was an Iranian commander in the Revolutionary Guards who died in Syrian civil war.

== Biography ==
Jamali-Paqaleh was born in 1963 in Paqaleh in Shahr-e Babak County, Kerman province. When he was two years old, his father died. He completed primary school in the village and then migrated to Rafsanjan to continue his education.

== Iran–Iraq War ==
Jamali-Paqaleh was a veteran of the Iran–Iraq War and was a member of the Sarallah division, the same division outfitted that had trained by General Qasem Soleimani. He had participated in several operations such as Operation Tariq al-Qods, Fath ol-Mobin, Beit ol-Moqaddas, Ramadan, Dawn 8, and Karbala-5,4,1.

== Syrian Civil War ==
The Iranian news outlet Mehr News Agency reported that Jamali voluntary went to Syria to protect the Sayyidah Zaynab Mosque and another holy shrine against Assad-opposing forces in the Syrian civil war.

Jamali-Paqaleh was reported to have been killed by Syrian rebels either in the final days of October or early November 2013. He was buried on 5 November in Kerman with full military honors.

== See also ==
- Hossein Hamadani
- Mohsen Ghitaslou
- Ali Reza Tavassoli
