= General Berry =

General Berry may refer to:

- Hiram Gregory Berry (1824–1863), Union Army major general
- Lucien Grant Berry (1863–1937), U.S. Army brigadier general
- Sidney Bryan Berry (1926–2013), U.S. Army lieutenant general

== See also ==
- Albay Ahmed Berri (fl. 2010s), Free Syrian Army brigadier general
