= Mohamed Fawzi =

Mohamed Fawzi may refer to:

- Mohamed Fawzi (general) (1915–2000), Egyptian general
- Mohamed Fawzi (singer) (1918–1966), Egyptian composer and singer
- Mohamed Fawzi (footballer) (born 1990), Emirati football player

== See also ==
- Mahmoud Fawzi (1900–1981), Egyptian diplomat and political figure
- Mohamed Fawzy (born 1993), Egyptian football player
- Fauzi Mohammed Ayub, Lebanese-Canadian Hisbollah member
- Fawzi
- Muhammad (disambiguation)
