= Daraa offensive (February–May 2014) =

Campaign during the Syrian Civil War

- Part of the Syrian civil war
Date	3 February – 27 May 2014 (3 months, 3 weeks and 3 days)
Location	Daraa Governorate, Quneitra Governorate, and As-Suwayda Governorate, Syria
Result	Indecisive: Rebels capture the Gharaz central prison, Daraa grain silos, three villages, five strategic hills, Battalion 508 and Brigade 61 HQ.; Rebels temporarily lift the siege of Nawa, before it was besieged again; Rebel attack on Busra al-Sham repelled; Army captures two areas south of Quneitra city, and Tal Buraq hill

Belligerents
Free Syrian Army; Islamic Front; Al-Nusra Front	(Syria) Syrian Arab Republic: Syrian Armed Forces; National Defense Force; Hezbollah Arab Nationalist Guard

Commanders and leaders
Brig. Gen. Abdul-Ilah al-Bashir (FSA Chief of Staff, 16 February 2014–present); Col. Ahmad Al-Na’meh; Brig. Gen. Salim Idris (FSA Chief of Staff, until 16 February 2014)	Maj. Gen. Suheil Salman Hassan (5th Armoured Division) Fauzi Ayub † (Senior Hezbollah commander)

Units involved
58 light armament battalions	Syrian Army; 5th Armoured Division (Syria); 12th Armored Brigade; 15th Mechanized Brigade; 112th Mechanized Brigade; 132nd Mechanized Brigade; 175th Artillery Regiment; 9th Armored Division; 52nd Armored Brigade

Strength
30,000 fighters, according to unnamed "opposition websites"	17,000 soldiers and militiamen

The 2014 Daraa offensive (also known as the Battle of Geneva Houran) was a campaign during the Syrian Civil War launched by rebel forces, including the Free Syrian Army and the Islamic Front and Al-Nusra Front, to push back government forces in the Daraa Governorate, Quneitra Governorate, and As-Suwayda Governorate, in southwestern Syria, and thus opening the road to Damascus.

The offensive was launched on 3 February 2014 and declared after a meeting between FSA battalions and Islamic factions, which established a joint operations room. It was also reported that the FSA operations rooms in Daraa, Damascus and Quneitra were incorporated in this joint operations room as well. Local rebel commanders stated that thousands of rebels who had western military training would be involved in the Daraa offensive. The Persian Gulf states had promised to send rebels in Daraa large amounts of weaponry, including anti tank weapons and air missiles.

== Offensive ==
=== Start of the offensive, Army counter-attack and stalemate ===
In the first days of the offensive, it was reported that rebels captured the Atman checkpoint in Daraa, destroying another one and captured Army positions around the town of Atman.

On 14 February 49 rebel groups affiliated with the FSA announced that they united under one armed entity called Southern Front. That same day a car bomb killed at least 33 people (including 12 rebel fighters) in the rebel-held village of Yabuda. Activists accused the Syrian government to be behind the attack. It was also reported that 22 people (including 19 civilians) were killed by air strikes on rebel-held areas in Daraa province.

On 16 February, Brigadier General Salim Idris was dismissed and replaced by Brigadier General Abdul-Ilah al-Bashir as FSA Chief of Staff. The same day, rebels captured an Army checkpoint in the village of Western Gharia, but lost it the next day.

On 18 February, rebels from the town of Busra al-Harir, in the eastern part of Daraa province attacked and captured the military outpost known as the Chemicals Battalion or Kimyaa Battalion, west of Dwera village, but the Syrian Army recaptured it hours later. During the fighting, 22 soldiers and dozens of rebels were killed or injured. In conjunction with the attack on the post, rebels attacked the city of Busra al-Sham, near Daraa's border with the southwest of Suwaida province. However, government forces were able to repulse the attack. For its part, the Army launched a surprise offensive during the morning using tanks and air strikes against the villages of al-Hajjeh, al-Dawayeh al-Kubra, al-Sughra, Bir Ajam and al-Buraika in the central and southern parts of al-Quneitra.

On 19 February, the Syrian Air Force began heavy air raids on rebel positions in Daraa governorate, as rebel fighters were preparing for a major push towards Damascus in the following days.

On 22 February, according to a military source, government forces captured the areas of Rasm al-Hour and Rasm al-Sad, south of the town of Quneitra. The SOHR confirmed troops were on the offensive, with the Air Force also taking part in the attack.

On 23 February, nine rebel groups (including Jabhat Al-Nusra and Ahrar Al Sham) announced the start of a new battle focused on eight military zones belonging to the 61st Brigade in western Daraa countryside.

On the night of 25 February, rebels, led by the Al-Nusra Front, made an attempt to capture the Tal al-Jabiyah military facility, which reportedly contained chemical weapons. International military commanders based in Jordan warned the rebels to leave the weapons alone and hand them over to them in the case they capture the bunker complex or an Israeli airstrike would be called in on the location. The rebels agreed. However, by the next day, rebels were still pushing to take control of Tal Al Jabiyeh. The Amman command centre than halted all weapons supplies to the assaulting forces, apparently in a successful effort to delay their advance on the bunker. Without supplies, the rebels were forced to consolidate their positions around the base and not seek to capture it. Over the next two days, government reinforcements arrived and by 1 March the military managed to push back the rebels.

On 26 February, the Syrian Army tried to advance towards the towns of Inkhil and Nawa and reinforced their positions to the south of the village of Al-Nuaimeh the next day, while the rebels tightened the siege they had imposed on Army checkpoints in the area, in an attempt to block reinforcements from reaching government troops.

On 11 March, the Syrian Air Force conducted seven airstrikes on rebel-held areas in southern Daraa province, while the district of Daraa al-Balad was bombarded by the 285th battalion.

On 19 March, the rebels took control of the central Gharaz prison in Daraa province after the Syrian Army retreated towards the grain silos. An opposition source stated that 294 prisoners were freed. Other sources stated that about 300 to 400 prisoners were freed and claimed that the vehicle training grounds to the south of the prison and a “secret facility” were also captured by the rebels. After the capture of the prison, the battlefront shifted towards the silos in an attempt by the rebels to take control of them.

As of 20 March, rebels in Daraa were unable to progress north past the line of government-held towns at Nawa, Sheikh Maskeen and Izraa. The Army had also taken up defensive positions, but it could not attack from these positions. Overall, a stalemate ensued. The main reason for the lack of a rebel advance was said to be that no new weapons had arrived across the border from Jordan.

On 21 March, rebels captured the grain silos and the Gharz gas station, located near the Daraa Gharaz prison. Rebels also claimed to have seized armoured vehicles after the fighting. After the capture of the silos, heavy clashes broke out on the perimeter of the Qussad military checkpoint, while the Syrian Air Force bombarded the Gharz area. The SOHR reported by the end of the day that the rebels also took the Qussad military checkpoint.

=== Renewed rebel advance and FSA-Nusra tension ===
On 7 April, rebels captured one of the twin military hills of Tulul al-Humur in Quneitra province after it was besieged for weeks.

On 14 April, rebels advanced towards Tal al-Jabiyah hill, which is one of several that are part of the Brigade 61 Army base and is the main one protecting the base from the west, after capturing several bunker positions throughout the area earlier in the year. By 24 April, rebels captured Tal al-Jabiyah hill and the village of Al Sekkariyyi, near Nawa. The rebels seized two tanks and large caches of weapons. The Army reportedly retreated to a nearby base after losing the hill. The next day the Army made an attempt to recapture the hill which was unsuccessful. Overall 49 rebels and 62 government fighters were killed during the two days of fighting for the hill. On 26 April, it was reported that the Army started to retreat from areas surrounding Tal al-Jabiyah hill, while rebels were focusing on capturing Tal Jamu hill, five kilometers from Tal al-Jabiyah, in an attempt to link up their territory in Daraa with rebel territory in Quneitra province. Later that day, rebels reportedly seized Brigade 61 and the Tayroz checkpoint near Nawa.

On 27 April, rebels reportedly took control of large parts of the strategic area of eastern Tal al-Ahmar. It was later reported that the rebels fully captured eastern Tal Al Ahmar, while the Army captured 'Tal Buraq' hill, near Mashara, without any resistance, on the 29th.

On 1 May, it was reported that rebels captured 508 Antitank Battalion, the village of Tira and the 'Tal Ashtara' hill. The same day, the FSA-affiliated Southern Syrian Revolutionary Front was established, consisting of some 20 rebel groups. Three days later, several rebel commanders belonging to this front (including the commander: Colonel Ahmad Al-Na’meh) were arrested by the al-Nusra front. This incident evoked tension in Daraa, with some moderate rebels saying that they will attack al-Nusra Front if the commanders are not released from custody. A mediation committee had been set up to deal with the case, involving leading figures from both sides, as well as tribal sheikhs. Colonel Ahmad Al-Na’meh was forced to make a confession on video after four days of detainment.

On 5 May, rebels announced the start of a new offensive called "Allahu Akbar” in the aim to capture the Matouq al-Kabir hill, Matouq al-Saghir hill and Kharbat Fadi area on the perimeter of Inkhil city. Heavy clashes erupted on the perimeter of these hills and the 115th division, resulting in casualties on both sides and a damaged ZSU-23-4 "Shilka". Both hills were captured after three days of fighting. It was also reported that seven rebels were killed by a pipeline explosion between Nasib and the Gharz area, and that one of the previously arrested rebel leaders was released by the Al-Nusra Front.

On 6 May, rebels captured the Syrian Colonel Mohammad Hassan Kanaan on the highway between Damascus and Daraa. Kanaan was one of the 24 people who nominated themselves to stand in the 3 June presidential election. It was also reported that an emir in the al-Nusra Front and his wife were assassinated by a car bomb.

On 8 May, rebels launched a military operation against al-Qahtania, al-Hamedia, Quneitra Crossing and the al-Rawadi checkpoint in Quneitra province. The Army launched a counter-attack after rebels captured al-Qahtania village.

On 15 May, rebels detonated a 'tunnel bomb' in the Al-Manshiyah district of Daraa city after announcing a new offensive.

=== New Army counter-attack ===
On 16 May 2014, the Army launched a counter-attack, firing 100 rockets and carrying out 15 air strikes on Nawa. The focus of the government offensive were Nawa, Inkhil, Jasem and Deraa city. The next day, the military recaptured Tal al-Jabiyah hill. The military was also attempting to advance towards western and eastern Tal al-Ahmar in an attempt to prevent rebels from advancing toward Quneitra. A deal was also reportedly reached under which 2,000 rebels would be granted safe passage to evacuate from Jassem, which overlooks southern Daraa. The deal was set to expire within 48 hours. The same day, the Iranian Fars news agency claimed government troops had captured Um Al-Awsaj, opening the road connecting al-Sanamein-Zamreen-Tal al-Hara.

On 19 May, the Fars news agency reported that government troops had recaptured the headquarters of Battalion 74. The next day, the agency also claimed that government forces gained full control over the area of Old Sajna Neighborhood in Daraa al-Balad and completed the encirclement of Nawa, with the Army seizing control of the Eastern neighborhood and was moving towards the National Hospital on the north-west side of the city. On the same day, rebels blew up a building used by government forces, killing dozens.

On 20 May, it was confirmed the Army had entered Nawa from the west and east, with fighting raging in the city. At least 15 soldiers were killed in the afternoon amid clashes with rebels in the town.

On 22 May 2014, a mortar attack on a tent where approximately 100 government supporters and civilians had gathered in the city to discuss the upcoming 3 June 2014 presidential election killed at least 21 and injured scores more. It is not verified who conducted the attack, but Ahmad Masalma, an opposition activist in Daraa, said rebels from the Free Syrian Army umbrella group fired a mortar shell at the tent in a government-held area after repeatedly warning civilians to stay away.

On 23 May, according to the SOHR, rebels captured an Army checkpoint west of Tell Umm Hawran. Four days later, it was reported that Fauzi Ayub, a senior Hezbollah commander on the FBI Most Wanted Terrorists list, was killed during fighting in Nawa.

== Aftermath ==
On 14 June, rebels captured the strategical al-Jomou' hill base, located between Tsil and Nawa, after a siege and captured 10 pro-government fighters during the fighting.

On 15 July, several rebel formations announced the start of an operation against military installations in the Al-Shaykh Saad area. Later that day, according to the SOHR, rebels managed to capture the transportation battalion base, 26th Battalion base and the tank battalion base (all belonging to the Brigade 61 base complex) in Al-Shaykh Saad. The next day, 13 rebel groups announced the formation of a single operation room for Daraa province.

On 20 July, several rebel groups announced the start of the battle "Qat’e Al Watin" (Cutting the Aorta) in Daraa province. 13 rebel fighters were killed on the first day of the operation.

On 26 August, at least 30 rebel fighters were killed by an army ambush near the town of al-Harra. Rebels were able to take control of the nearby town of Zimrin, but were unable to advance further towards Harra and its military base.

Also, during August, Bedouin tribes in northeastern Suwayda province took up arms against the Syrian Army and the National Defence Force. The town of Eib in Lajat area fell into rebel hands. Fighters from Jabhat al-Nusra reinforced rebel positions in the area after National Defence Force units retook the villages of Dama and Deir Dama from Bedouin rebels. Mortar fire was still directed at the towns, however, by rebel fighters.

On 10 September, the Syrian army also mobilized reinforcements to move toward the government-held cities of al-Harra, al-Sanamayn, al-Jidiya and Zimrin in Daraa province.
