= Quneitra Military Council =

- Leaders: Brig. Gen. Abdul-Ilah al-Bashir (until 16 February 2014)
- Group: Grandsons Brigade
- Active regions: Quneitra Governorate
- Part of: Free Syrian Army; Southern Front
- Wars: the Syrian civil war

The Quneitra Military Council is a Syrian rebel coalition affiliated with the Free Syrian Army that was armed with U.S.-made BGM-71 TOW anti-tank missiles. It operates in the Quneitra Governorate. The group's leader, Brigadier General Abdul-Ilah al-Bashir was appointed the Chief-of-Staff of the Supreme Military Council (SMC) on 16 February 2014.

== See also ==
- List of armed groups in the Syrian Civil War
