= Abdul-Ilah al-Bashir al-Noeimi =

Former Chief of Staff of the Free Syrian Army

- عبد الإله البشير النعيمي
- Born: c. 1960; Idlib
- Military career
- Allegiance: Ba'athist Syria (until 2012) (Syrian opposition) Free Syrian Army (2012–2025)
- Branch: (Syria) Syrian Army (until 2012) (Syrian opposition) Free Syrian Army
- Rank: Brigadier general
- Conflicts: Syrian Civil War: Quneitra Governorate clashes; 2014 Daraa offensive; 2014 Latakia offensive

Abdul-Ilah al-Bashir al-Noeimi (Arabic: عبد الإله البشير النعيمي; c. 1960) is the former Chief of Staff of the Supreme Military Council (SMC) of the Free Syrian Army. He was succeeded by Albay Ahmed Berri in October 2014.

== Background ==
Noeimi comes from a large Arab tribe called the al-Noeim. The tribe is spread across the Middle East, and is prominent in the villages of the Golan Heights and the Quneitra countryside. Prior to the Syrian Civil War, Noeimi served as a career officer in the Syrian Army where he was Brigadier General.

== Syrian Civil War ==
Noeimi defected from the Syrian Army on 13 July 2012, alongside several other officers from the Noeimi tribe, including Saleh Al-Hammada Al-Noeimi, and Hashem Al-Bashir Al-Noeimi. He was later appointed Chief of the FSA Military Council in Quneitra.

Noeimi has called for support from the European Union and the United States, either through the supply of weapons, or through direct military intervention. Noeimi has also met with Iranian opposition groups such as the MEK, and has expressed his support for the overthrow of the Iranian government and the velayat-e faqih style of governance.

His son, Talal, was killed during clashes with the Syrian Army in the Quneitra countryside, on 26 November 2013.

Noeimi was appointed to the position of Chief of Staff on 16 February 2014, taking over from Salim Idris. His appointment was confirmed by the FSA on 8 March 2014. Colonel Heitham Afeisi, a co-founder of the Syria Revolutionaries Front and the Commander of the Maarat al-Naaman Martyrs Brigade, was appointed as Noeimi's deputy.

The United States has sidelined Noeimi's office, and American officials have called his title a "business card".

Military offices
Preceded by Salim Idris	Commander of the Free Syrian Army; 16 February 2014 – October 2014	Succeeded by Ahmed Berri
