= Ahmed Berri =

Former Chief of Staff of the Free Syrian Army

- أحمد بري
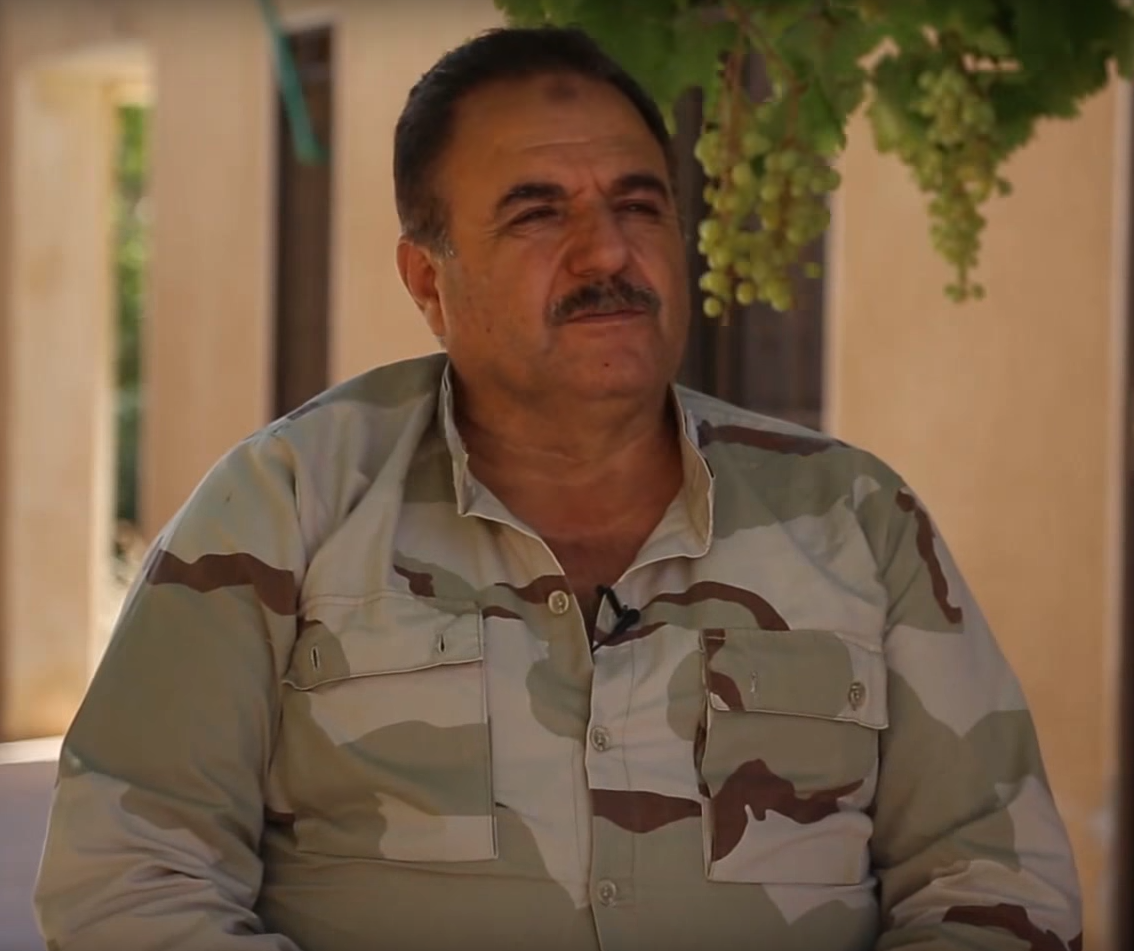
- Berri in 2016
- Military career
- Allegiance: Ba'athist Syria (until 2012) (Syrian opposition) Free Syrian Army (2012–2025)
- Branch: (Syria) Syrian Army (until 2012) (Syrian opposition) Free Syrian Army
- Rank: Brigadier general
- Conflicts: Syrian Civil War: 2015 Northwestern Syria offensive

Ahmed Berri (Arabic: أحمد بري) was the Chief of Staff of the Free Syrian Army. Berri was appointed to the position of Chief of Staff in October 2014, taking over from Abdul-Ilah al-Bashir.

== Syrian Civil War ==
Since 2012, Berri was commander of the infamous Hama Military Council. Free Syrian Army forces under its command committed the Aqrab massacre in December 2012, resulting in 125-300 civilians killed, most of them from the Alawite minority. On December 31, 2013, while on his way to Taftanaz, he was arrested with two of his soldiers at Islamic State of Iraq and the Levant's checkpoint and was put near Saraqeb, a city in northern Idlib. Following Idlib Military Council's push for his release and a demonstration of people in Maaret al-Numan, he was set free in Hama.

By the time of April 2015, Berri had reached the position of Deputy Chief of staff for the Free Syrian army.

In July 2015, during a dispute between the Supreme Military Council and the Syrian National Coalition, Berri was considered to be the concurrent chief of staff at the time by the SNC, while Abdelkarim al-Ahmed was considered the commander and chief of the FSA by the SMC. This dispute was seemingly never resolved, as the FSA would continue to further decentralize.

Military offices
Preceded by AbdulIlah al-Bashir	Commander of the Free Syrian Army; October 2014 – December 2014 July 2015 - present (disputed)	Succeeded by Abdelkarim al-Ahmed
