= Hassan Hamada =

Syrian general (born 1968)

Brigadier General Hassan Hamada
- حسن حمادة

Deputy Chief of Staff of the Syrian Air Force
- Incumbent
- Assumed office 9 October 2025
- President: Ahmed al-Sharaa
- Chief of staff: Mustafa Bakour

Defence Minister of the Syrian Interim Government
- In office 15 November 2021 – 30 January 2025
- Preceded by: Salim Idris
- Succeeded by: Position abolished

Personal details
- Born: Hassan Mirei al-Hamada c. 1968 Kafr Takharim, Idlib Governorate, Syria

Military service
- Allegiance: Syria (2024–present); Formerly: Ba'athist Syria (1991–2012); (Syrian opposition) Free Syrian Army (2011–2024); (Syrian opposition) Syrian Interim Government (2017-2025)
- Branch/service: Syrian Air Force (until 2012); Syrian National Army (2017–2025); Syrian Air Force (since 2025)
- Years of service: 1991–2012; 2017–2024 (Syrian opposition); 2025– (Syrian transitional government)
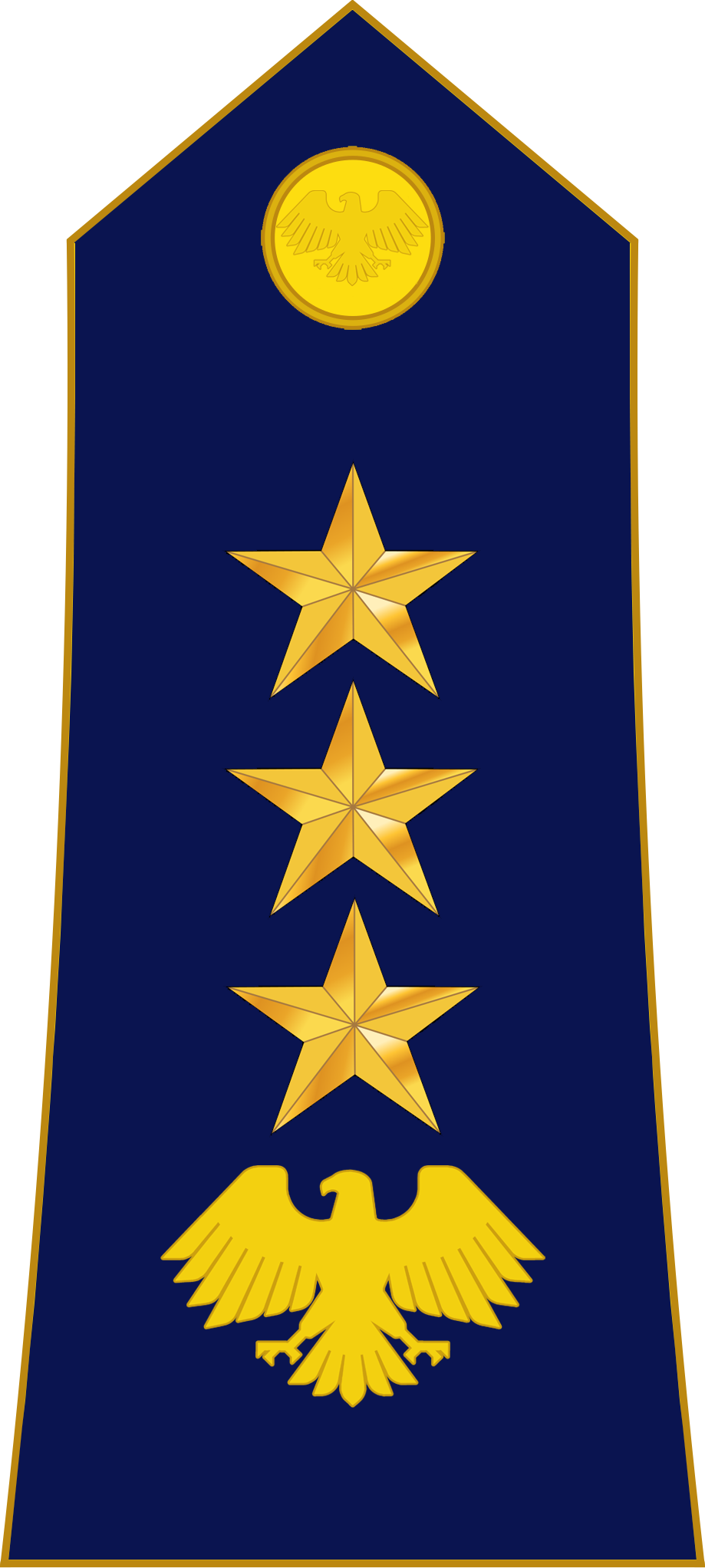
- Rank: Brigadier general
- Unit: 93rd Brigade (until 2012); 101st Infantry Division (2014–2017)
- Battles/wars: Syrian civil war

Hassan Hamada (Arabic: حسن حمادة; born c. 1968), full name Hassan Mirei al-Hamada (Arabic: حسن ميري آل حمادة،), also spelled as Hammadeh, is the Deputy Chief of Staff of the Syrian Air Force. As a former colonel in the Ba'athist Syrian Air Force who, together with his MiG-21, defected to Jordan on 21 June 2012 during the Syrian civil war. Prior to the fall of the Assad regime, he had served as defense minister in the Syrian Interim Government and chief of staff of the Syrian National Army.

== Military service ==
Before his defection in June 2012, Col. Hassan Hamada served in an airbase in the as-Suwayda Governorate as the head of the Scientific Research group in the 93rd Brigade.

== Defection ==
A Jordanian security source said Hamada flew from al-Dumayr Military Airport northeast of Damascus and landed at King Hussein Air Base at 11 a.m. Syrian state television said communications were lost with his plane at 10:34AM while he was on a training mission near the border with Jordan. Right after he landed, he reportedly removed his Air Force insignia and requested political asylum in Jordan, which the country later granted on 'humanitarian grounds'. There had been other defections and desertions from the Syrian military, but no Syrian Air Force pilots had been known to defect with their aircraft.

An anti-Assad activist reached in Syria, who spoke on condition of anonymity, said the pilot flew into Jordan after refusing orders to bomb targets in Syria. A Syrian government paramilitary force known as the Shabiha retaliated by setting fire to the homes of Hamada, his brother and his mother. Opposition sources said he had smuggled his family to Turkey before his defection.

Hamada’s defection raised questions about whether fealty to President Bashar Assad was fraying in the air force, the military branch regarded as closest to the Assad family. Hamada, like most Syrian pilots, belongs to the Sunni Muslim majority so his defection generated speculation that Sunni pilots would face new restrictions on any flying missions. Hamada’s defection also created additional tensions between Jordan and Syria. Syria has demanded the return of the plane and the pilot to Syria from Jordan. Jordan has sought to avoid becoming involved in the conflict in Syria, an important trading partner.

According to some sources, the MiG-21 aircraft flown by Col. Hamada was modified as an 'Optionally Piloted Aircraft', thought to be used in remotely controlled unmanned configuration for carrying chemical weapons.

After his defection in Jordan, Hassan Hamada sought refuge in the border town of Reyhanlı, Turkey.

== Military activities since defection ==
In March 2014, Hassan Hamada returned to the Idlib Governorate in northwestern Syria and formed the 101st Infantry Division of the Free Syrian Army. The group was supported by the Syrian Military Council and supplied with BGM-71 TOW anti-tank missiles from the United States and Saudi Arabia. The group was also in communication with the political National Coalition for Syrian Revolutionary and Opposition Forces.

Due to his previous service in the Syrian Air Force, in 2016, Hassan Hamada was involved in the development of improvised short-range surface-to-air missiles in the 101st Division.

On 15 November 2021, he was appointed defense minister in the Syrian Interim Government and chief of staff of the Syrian National Army, succeeding Salim Idris.

On 9 October 2025, following the fall of the Ba'athist-led regime, he was appointed Deputy Chief of Staff of the Syrian Air Force.
