= Hassan Shateri =

Iranian army officer (1955–2013)

Sardar Hassan Shateri
- حسن شاطری
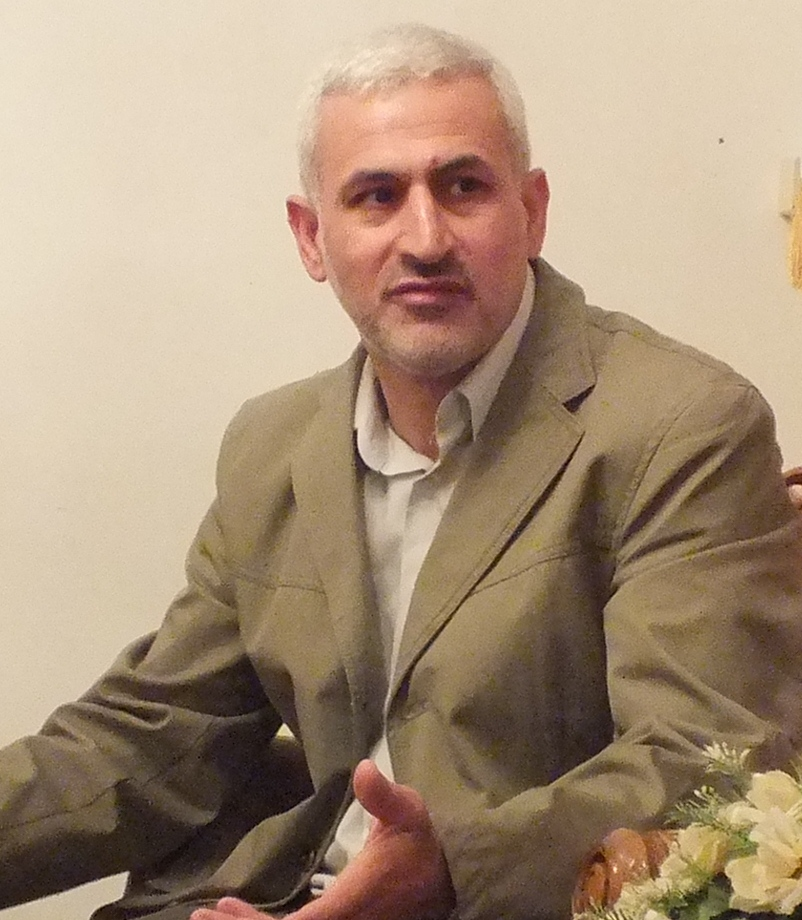
- Born: 1955; Semnan Province, Imperial State of Iran
- Died: February 12, 2013 (aged 57–58); Damascus–Beirut Highway, Syria
- Cause of death: Israeli airstrike
- Burial place: Iran
- Education: Urmia University (civil engineering)
- Military career
- Allegiance: Iran
- Rank: Major General
- Nickname: Hessam Khoshnevis
- Units: Basij; Quds Force
- Conflicts: 1979 Kurdish Rebellion; Iran–Iraq War

Hassan Shateri (Persian: حسن شاطری; 1955 – February 12, 2013), also known as Hesam Khoshnevis (حسام خوشنویس), was an Iranian military officer and Major General of Iran's elite IRGC Quds Force. He was a veteran of the Iran–Iraq war and head of the Iranian Committee for the Reconstruction of Lebanon after the 2006 Lebanon War, according to Iranian media. He was assassinated in February 2013.

Hojatoleslam Panahian said that "Our Shateri was no less than Mughniyeh", in his meeting with Shateri some years ago in Lebanon's embassy.

== Life ==
Shateri was born in Semnan, Iran, in 1955 to a religious family. In his teens, he actively participated in demonstrations against the Shah. He studied civil engineering. Following the Islamic revolution in Iran, he joined Basij in 1979. In 1980, when anti-revolution forces had captured Sardasht, he went there to participate in the fighting against them.

He was a battalion commander in 1981; head of logistics and operations of Hamza Sayyed al-Shohada Headquarters in 1983; head of logistics and operations, and chief of staff, of the Sardasht deployed the army in 1984; commander of operations of Sardasht in 1985–87; head of the engineering unit in Hamza Sayyed al-Shohada Headquarters in 1988; engineering unit deputy commander of the Hamza Sayyed al-Shohada Headquarters in 1990; and commander of the Isfahan Corps engineering unit.

== Assassination ==
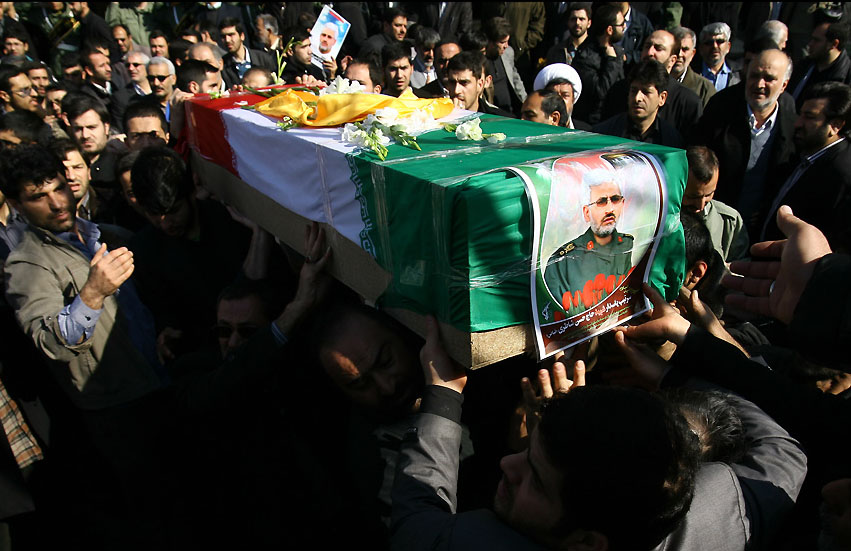
Funeral of Hassan Shateri

He was assassinated in Syria on February 12, 2013. According to a report by The Sunday Times, he was killed in an alleged IAF airstrike on a Hezbollah weapons convoy in Damascus, that contained the Russian-made SA-17 air defence missile system. Other reports said he was killed inside Syria by rebel militants battling the Syrian government. Iranian news outlets blamed his death on "Zionist agents". IRGC spokesman Ramezan Sharif claimed that Shateri had been murdered by Israeli agents. He had been in Aleppo before being killed.

He had been an Israeli assassination target for a long time. According to the Sunday Times, despite his caution, Shateri was very closely followed and his movements watched in Damascus by Mossad agents. But it appears that there was no time to mount a classic "hit and run" killing on the ground. Instead, it was decided the only option was airpower. According to information passed on by the agents, Shateri would be on his way to Beirut imminently and there was no time to lose. "He was a fox, a clever man, who gave us a hard time," said a well-informed Israeli intelligence source. "His death postponed the delivery of strategic weapons to Hezbollah, but I doubt if it will hold them up for long."

=== Funeral ===
He was buried in Tehran. IRGC General Mohammad Ali Jafari, Qods Force Major General Qasem Soleimani, and other Iranian officials attended his funeral.
