= Mohsen Gheytaslou =

Iranian military personnel

- Born: 1990; Pakdasht County, Iran
- Died: April 11, 2016 (aged 26); Syria
- Military career
- Allegiance: Iran
- Branch: Ground Forces of Islamic Republic of Iran Army
- Service years: ?–2016
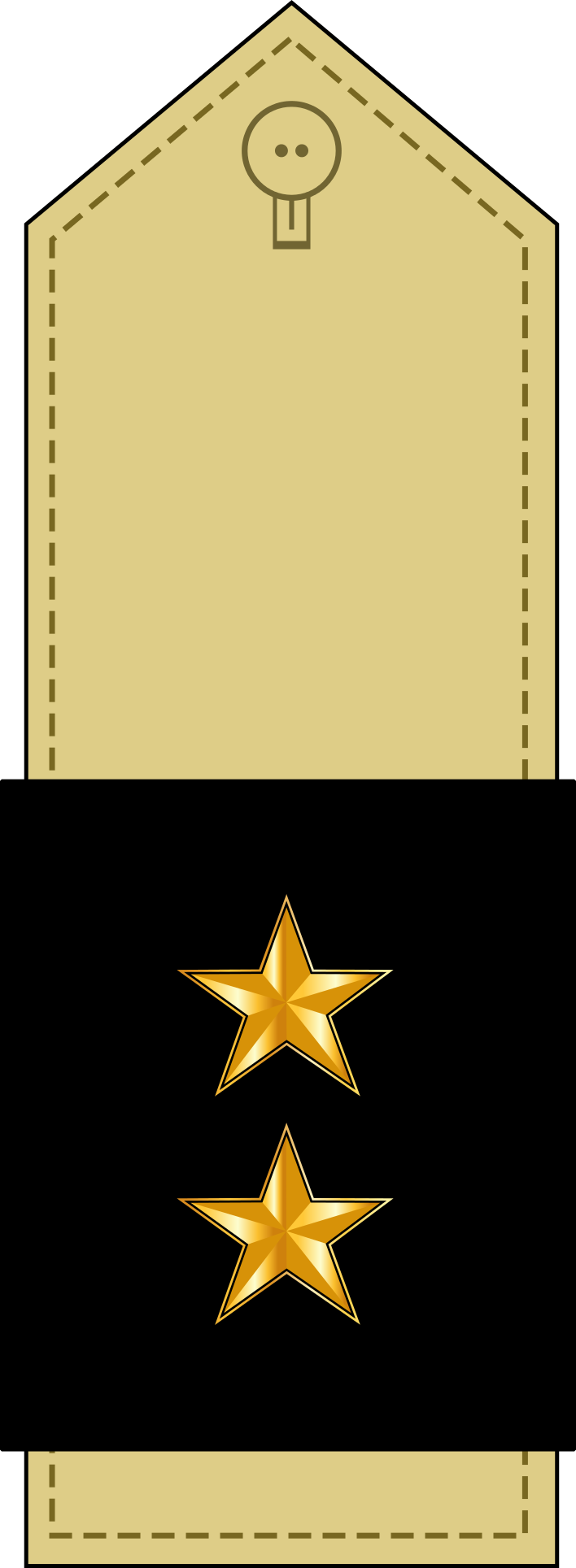
- Rank: Second lieutenant
- Unit: 65th NOHED Brigade
- Conflicts: Syrian Civil War; Iranian involvement in the Syrian Civil War; Battle of Aleppo (2012–2016); 2016 Southern Aleppo campaign †

Mohsen Gheytaslou (Persian: محسن قیطاسلو; 1990 - April 11, 2016) was an Iranian Takavar and the first member of the 65th Airborne Special Forces Brigade to be killed in the Syrian Civil War. He was deployed to Syria in an advisory capacity and to protect holy shrines in the Syria. Ghitaslou was killed on 11 April 2016 in Syria.

== Early life and military service ==
Born in 1990 in Pakdasht, Tehran Province, Qotaslou joined the regular Iranian armed forces in 2009. After completing airborne and commando qualification courses, he was assigned to the 65th Airborne Special Forces Brigade, a unit based in Tehran.

== Deployment to Syria and death ==
Until 2016, Iranian personnel deployed to Syria belonged almost exclusively to the Islamic Revolutionary Guard Corps (IRGC) and affiliated volunteer militias. In early 2016, the Iranian Army dispatched elements of the 65th Brigade to Syria in an advisory capacity.

Qotaslou was killed on 11 April 2016 during clashes with Al-Nusra Front militants near Khan Tuman, a town south of Aleppo. Three other commandos from the 65th Brigade died in the same series of engagements. Qotaslou's death was the first combat fatality recorded by the NOHED brigade outside Iran since the Iran–Iraq War ended in 1988.

== Burial and legacy ==
His remains were repatriated to Iran and buried in Section 50 of Tehran's Behesht-e Zahra cemetery. Iranian authorities and press outlets designated him a "Defender of the Shrine" (Modafe-e Haram), the official term applied to Iranian and allied fighters killed in Syria and Iraq. Mohsen Sadeghnia wrote a biography of Qotaslou titled Ma'muriyat-e Makhsus (Special Mission), and Islamic Republic of Iran Broadcasting (IRIB) covered his deployment in the documentary Ma'muriyat 2257.
