= Pa Qaleh, Shahr-e Babak =

Village in Kerman, Iran

Pa Qaleh پاقلعه
- Village
- Location within Iran
- Coordinates: 30°15′39″N 55°28′42″E
- Country: Iran
- Province: Kerman
- County: Shahr-e Babak
- Bakhsh: Central
- Rural District: Pa Qaleh

Population (2006)
  - Total: 138
- Time zone: UTC+3:30 (IRST)
  - Summer (DST): UTC+4:30 (IRDT)

Pa Qaleh (Persian: پاقلعه, also Romanized as Pā Qal‘eh; also known as Pā’īn Qal‘eh, Pāi Qal‘eh, and Pa yi Qal‘eh) is a village in Pa Qaleh Rural District, in the Central District of Shahr-e Babak County, Kerman Province, Iran. At the 2006 census, its population was 138, in 37 families.
