= Hossein Hamadani =

Islamic revolutionary guard corps commander

Sardar Hossein Hamedani
- حسین همدانی
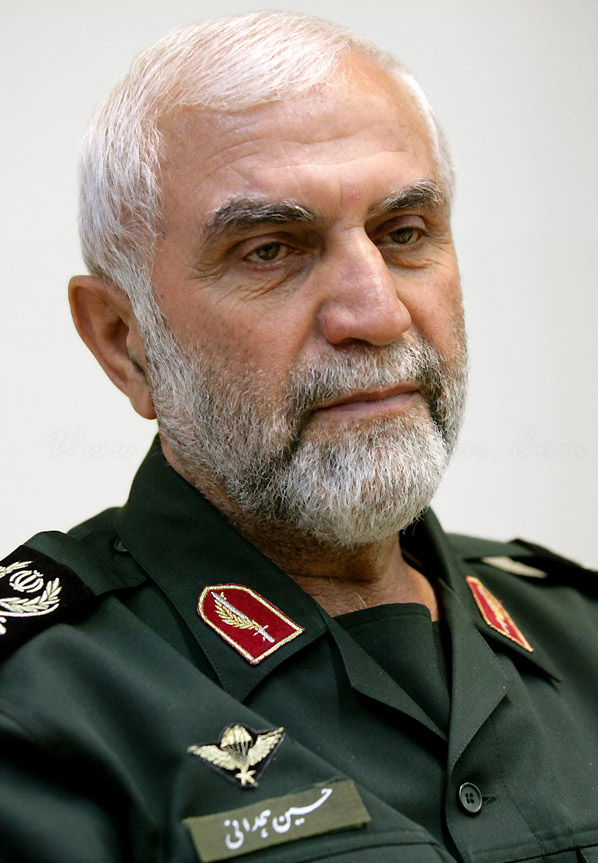
- Born: 15 December 1950; Abadan, Imperial State of Iran
- Died: 7 October 2015 (aged 64); Aleppo, Syria
- Burial place: Hamedan, Iran
- Military career
- Allegiance: Iran
- Branch: Islamic Revolutionary Guard Corps
- Service years: 1979–2015
- Rank: Brigadier general Major General (posthumously)
- Unit: Quds Force
- Commands: Ansar-al-Hossein Division of Hamedan; Rassoulollah Corps (2009–2014)
- Conflicts: 1979 Kurdish Rebellion; Iran–Iraq War (WIA); Operation Before the Dawn; Operation Mersad; Syrian Civil War †
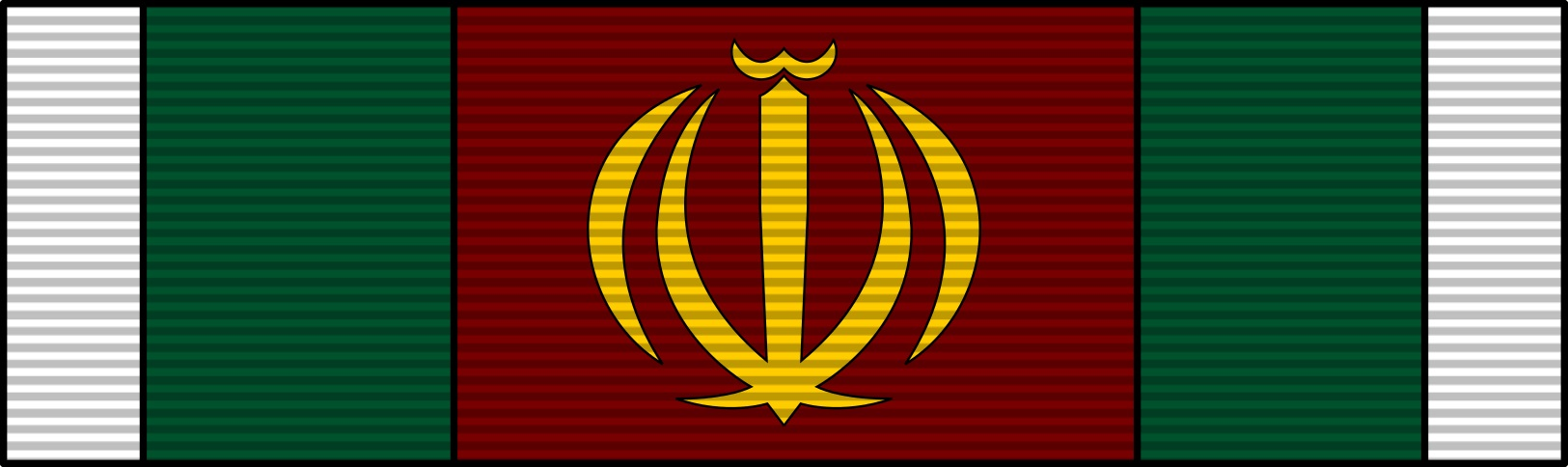
- Awards: Order of Fath (2)

Hossein Hamadani, also spelled Hamedani (Persian: حسین همدانی; 15 December 1950 – 7 October 2015), was an Iranian Revolutionary Guard commander. He was posthumously promoted to a Major General.

== Biography ==
Hamadani was born in Abadan, Iran. His parents were originally from Hamadan.

Hamadani first rose to prominence during the 1979 Kurdish rebellion in Iran and the Iran–Iraq War, where he helped suppress the Communist rebellion in Iranian Kurdistan. Mohammad Ali Jafari appointed him as Deputy Commander of the IRGC in 2005, and together they planned how to deal with any attempted "velvet revolution" in Iran. Hamadani subsequently helped to suppress the 2009 election protests in Iran. He had been head of the IRGC's Rassoulollah Corps in charge of Greater Tehran from November 2009 until January 2014, and had been subject to international sanctions since 14 April 2011.

Hamadani had written three books:

- Moonlight of Khayyen (مهتاب خین), narrating the Iranian Revolution, conflicts in Kordestan, and the Iran–Iraq War.
- Conquerors of Khorramshahr (فاتحان خرمشهر), narrating the Liberation of Khorramshahr.
- Brother, It's Duty (تکلیف است برادر), an autobiography.

Hamadani also served in Syria as both an advisor to the Syrian army during the Syrian Civil War and as overseer for Quds Force operations in support of the Syrian government.

Hamadani was killed in an ISIL attack in Aleppo, Syria on 7 October 2015.
