= Riad al-Asaad =

Syrian military officer and politician (born 1961)

Brigadier General Riad al-As'aad
- رياض موسى الأسعد

Personal details
- Born: 2 February 1961 (age 65) Idlib, Syria

Military service
- Allegiance: Syria (2026–present); Formerly: Ba'athist Syria (1980-July 2011); (Syrian opposition) Syrian National Coalition (2012-2014); Syrian Salvation Government (2017-2024)
- Branch/service: Syrian Air Force (1980–2011) (Syrian opposition) Free Syrian Army (2011–14) Syrian Army (2026–)
- Years of service: 1980–2014; 2026–
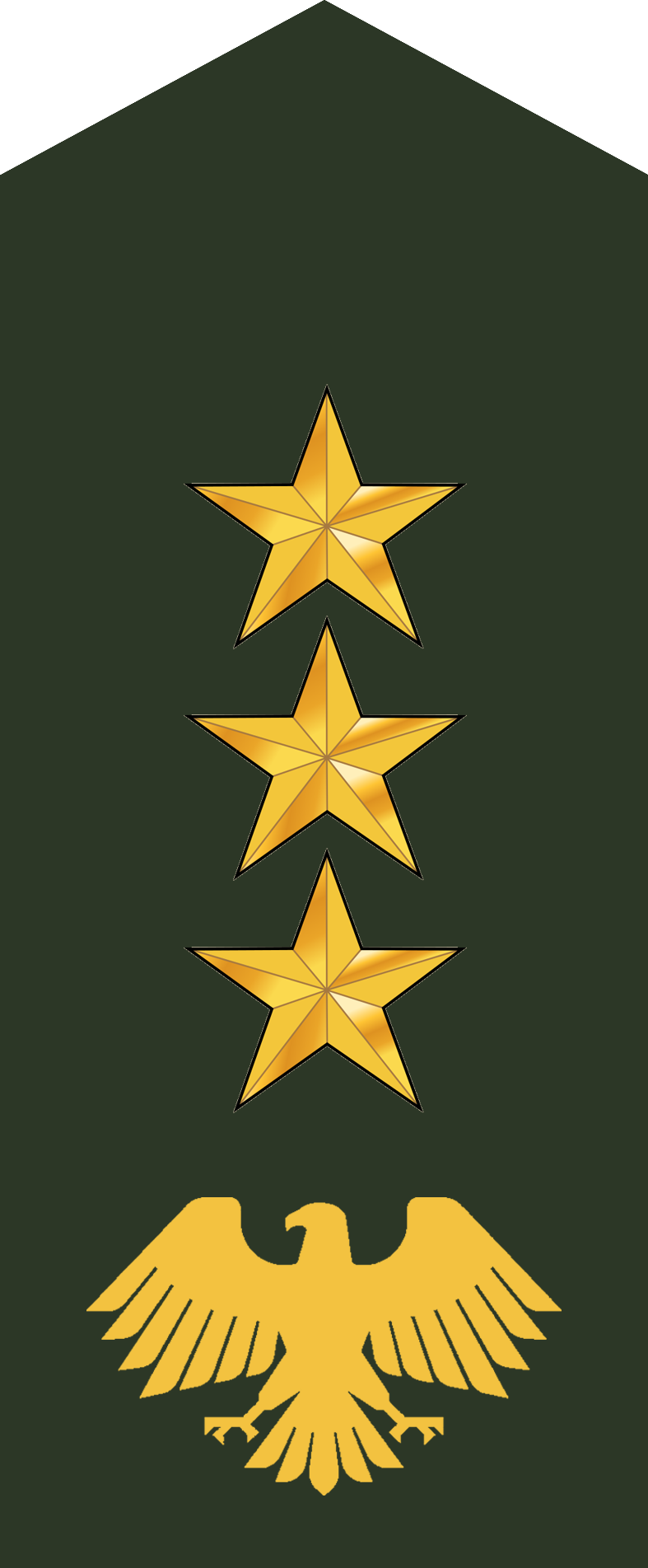
- Rank: Brigadier general
- Commands: Free Syrian Army
- Battles/wars: Syrian Civil War

Riad Mousa al-As'aad (Arabic: رياض موسى الأسعد, pronounced [riˈjɑːdˤ ˈmuːsa lˈʔæsʕæd]; born 2 February 1961) is a Syrian military officer and politician who is the founding leader of the Free Syrian Army. One of the prominent faces of the Syrian civil war, he led armed resistance to the Assad regime as commander-in-chief of the FSA, during the early phase of the Syrian Civil War. Under Riad al-Asaad's command, the FSA expanded into a paramilitary force of 75,000 guerilla fighters and insurgents in March 2012; capable of ousting regime forces from Damascus. He served as deputy prime minister for Military Affairs of the Syrian Salvation Government, a position he has held from 2 November 2017 to 2024. He was a former colonel in the Syrian Air Force who defected to the opposition in July 2011 and became the first Acting Commander-in-chief of the Free Syrian Army.

Some of his family members were executed by the regime of Bashar al-Assad.

== Establishment of the Free Syrian Army ==
Following the outbreak of violence in Syria in March 2011, Colonel Riad al-Asaad announced his defection from the Syrian Air Force on 4 July 2011. He initially joined the Free Officers Movement after this defection.

On 29 July 2011, al-Asaad along with other defectors declared the establishment of the Free Syrian Army, with the intention of fighting an insurgent war to overthrow the government of Bashar al-Assad. Colonel Asaad opposed any exile solution for Syrian president Bashar al-Assad, and vowing to fight until his government was overthrown.

On 22 September 2012, the Free Syrian Army (FSA) announced that it had moved its command centre from Turkey to liberated areas inside Syria. Alongside other military commanders of the FSA, Riad al-Asaad also hinted plans for initiating an offensive on Damascus, stating:

"To the Syrian people, its freedom fighters and all the armed factions, we are glad to let you know that the leadership of the FSA has moved into Syria following arrangements made with other brigades that included securing liberated areas with the hope of launching the offensive on Damascus."

== UN ceasefire attempt 2012 ==
After UN military observers entered Syria, al-Asa'ad announced a ceasefire for all forces, committed to the Kofi Annan peace plan for Syria. However, after a few days he reannounced continuation of attacks led by rebels because the government of Bashar al-Assad, according to him, did not make peace as promised. On 31 May 2012, al-Asa'ad urged Kofi Annan to scrap his peace plan which he claims failed.

== Position within the Free Syrian Army ==
Colonel Kasim Saaduddin, a member of the FSA, stated that al-Asaad did not have control over the Free Syrian Army, which al-Asaad himself denied in the interview.

On 8 December 2012, in Antalya, Turkey, Asaad was replaced by Brigadier General Salim Idris as effective military commander of the Free Syrian Army.

== Criticism from opposition protesters ==
Riad al-Asaad received criticism from some opposition protesters in the city of Salamiyah. A protest on 3 August 2012 claimed that "Mr. General Riad al-Asaad, while our city protested for the first time, you were working for Assad's regime".

== Assassination attempts ==
In an interview with the Voice of Russia made in early August 2012, al-Asaad claimed that the Syrian government attempted to assassinate him several times and for that reason, he was being guarded by Turkish intelligence.

On 25 March 2013, he was the victim of a car bomb explosion near Mayadin, in eastern Syria. He was taken to Turkey for treatment, where his right leg was amputated. In his 2015 book, The Syrian Jihad, analyst Charles Lister cites a "senior Ahrar al-Sham leader" as telling him the rebel group had "secretly traced the assassination attempt on Riad al-Asaad back to Jabhat al-Nusra."

== Syrian Salvation Government ==
In late August 2017, Riad al-Asaad attended a conference in Idlib, held by Tahrir al-Sham, which established the Syrian Salvation Government on 2 November. Riad al-Asaad said that "Tahrir al-Sham has previously declared that it will be dissolve itself, which is an external and internal demand". He said that they "did not attend the conference and we did not communicate with them after it ended, either". However, the Hawar Kilis Operations Room, part of the Turkish-backed Free Syrian Army, condemned al-Asaad and accused him of conspiring with al-Qaeda.

On 2 November 2017, Riad al-Asaad was appointed Deputy Prime Minister for Military Affairs of the Syrian Salvation Government (a de facto alternative government of the Syrian opposition).

== Fall of the Assad regime ==
In December 2024, after the fall of the Assad government, Asaad returned to Damascus and said that the Free Syrian Army (FSA) had been working closely with Islamist group Hay'at Tahrir al-Sham (HTS), which led to the overthrow of the Assad regime.

== Opinions ==
Al-Asaad has made controversial statements such as suggesting that suicide bombing is "an integral part of revolutionary action, of Free Syrian Army action."

In an undated video uploaded on 26 March 2013, Colonel Riad al-Asaad defended al-Nusra Front, describing them as, "our brothers in Islam". As part of the interview, he asserted that the FSA had provided direct support for al-Nusra in order to aid their fight against the Ba'ath government.

In a 2016 interview with Turkish daily newspaper Yeni Şafak, Asaad said that the Democratic Union Party (PYD) was more dangerous than ISIL, adding that ISIL was a temporary fraction in the area while the PYD is a cause of permanent devastation which brings long term crisis to the region. He asserted that the existence of PYD and ISIL violence was connected with the continuation of the Assad regime and that extremism in Syria would vanish if Assad left power. He stated that the PYD and its armed wing People's Protection Units (YPG) aimed to establish a separate Kurdish state in northern Syria but it would not be possible. The group, he said, was spreading hatred among Turkmens, Arabs, Alawites and Kurds living in the area. He also asserted that the group, which claims to defend Kurds, was supported by both the U.S. military and regime forcess and had killed hundreds of Arabs, Turkmens, and even Kurds who opposed their Marxist-Socialist strategy. "U.S. is equally responsible as Assad, Russia and Iran for killing hundreds of thousands of civilians in Syria," the FSA commander said. He stated that PYD was a plan by the U.S. and Europe to sabotage the Syrian people's resistance, especially the Free Syrian Army.

Military offices
Preceded by Office established	Commander of the Free Syrian Army; 29 July 2011 – 8 December 2012 (as of 8 December 2012 only symbolically Head of State)	Succeeded by Salim Idris
