= Supreme Military Council (Syria) =

Leadership of the Free Syrian Army, 2012–2014

- المجلس العسكري الأعلى
- Official logo of the council
- Leaders: Brig. Gen. Salim Idris (first commander, 2012–14); Brig. Gen. Abdul-Ilah al-Bashir al-Noeimi (second commander, 2014-2015); Brig. Gen. Ahmed Berri (third commander, supported by SMC, disputed by SNC, 2015-2015); Abdulkerim el Ahmed (third/fourth commander, supported by SNC, disputed by SMC, 2015-2015); Col. Qassem Saadeddine (spokesman)
- Dates active: 7 December 2012 – unclear (seemingly inactive since July, 2015)
- Allegiance: National Coalition for Syrian Revolutionary and Opposition Forces
- Active regions: Syria
- Size: 30 officers, representing 5 fronts
- Part of: Free Syrian Army
- Wars: the Syrian Civil War

The Supreme Military Council (SMC) (Arabic: المجلس العسكري الأعلى, also called the Supreme Military Command) was the highest military leadership of the Free Syrian Army (FSA) from late 2012 to at least mid-2015. The establishment of the organisation was announced on 7 December 2012 with the backing of western and Arab powers as a means of financing and arming Syrian rebel forces.

The Supreme Military Council of the FSA recognized the National Coalition for Syrian Revolutionary and Opposition Forces as the "civil authority" of the Syrian opposition.

== History ==
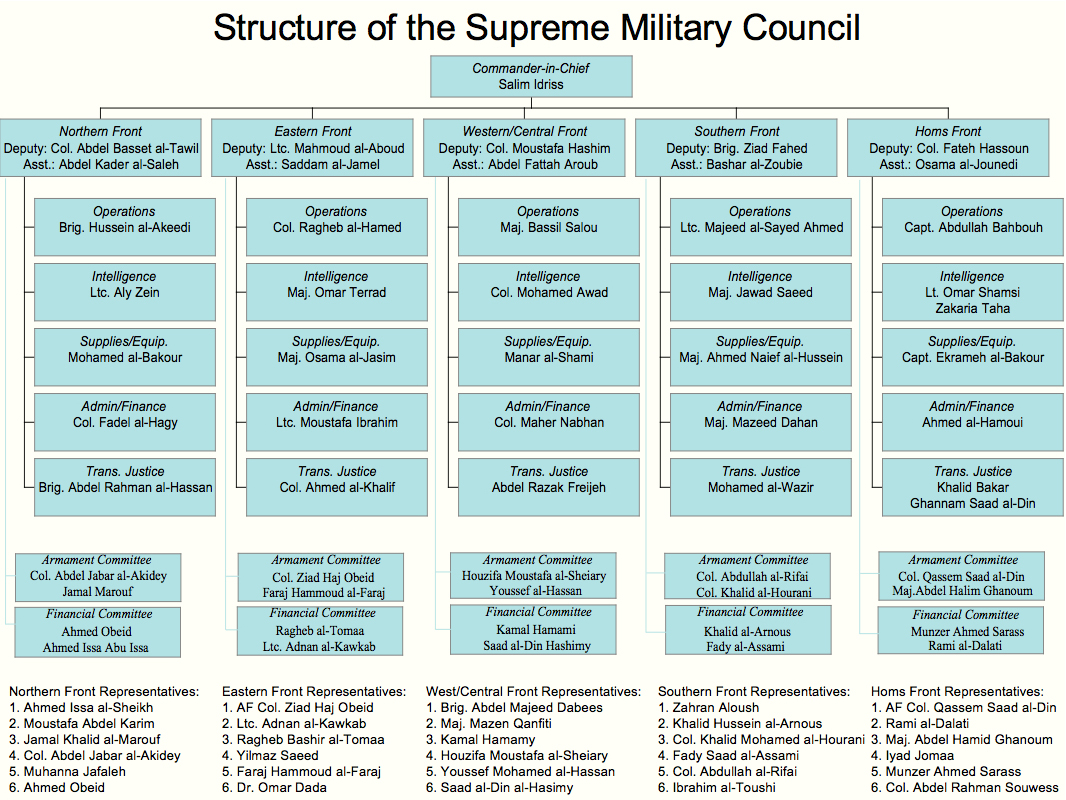
Structure of the SMC by late 2013

On 7 December 2012, 260 rebel commanders from all over Syria agreed to a unified command structure of the Free Syrian Army. The participants elected a 30-member Supreme Military Council, which then selected Brigadier General Salim Idris as Chief of Staff. The 30 members of the council were divided in groups of six, with each group representing one of five fronts: Southern (Daraa, Damascus, and as-Suwayda), Western (Hama, Latakia and Tartus), Northern (Aleppo and Idlib), Eastern (Deir ez-Zor, al-Hasakah and Raqqa), and Central (Homs and al-Rastan). The council was created with the backing of western powers and many Arab states as a vehicle to finance and arm rebel groups.

On 11 July 2013, a commander of the SMC's Western Front, Kamal al-Hamami, met with the Islamic State of Iraq and the Levant (ISIL) in the Latakia Governorate, which resulted in him being killed by ISIL. ISIL then threatened to kill all SMC members.

In September 2013, the al-Tawhid Brigade, Islam Brigade, and Suqour al-Sham Brigade, the largest militias in the SMC, joined with al-Qaeda's al-Nusra Front and several Salafi jihadist and other Sunni Islamic fundamentalist groups to form the Islamic Coalition. The SMC-affiliated groups in the coalition stressed that they were not breaking with SMC, but only the political exile wing in the National Coalition for Syrian Revolutionary and Opposition Forces. This left official SMC commander Salim Idriss formally in control of just a few small units.

Between 6 and 7 December 2013, the al-Nusra Front and/or the ISIL raided warehouses under direct control of the SMC at the Bab al-Hawa Border Crossing with Turkey and captured weapons and equipment. The warehouses, one of the largest held by the rebels at the time, held numerous weapons and equipment supplied to the SMC by Saudi Arabia, Qatar, the United States, United Kingdom, France, and other foreign supporters of the opposition. The SMC leadership requested the Islamic Front, formed by most member groups of the Islamic Coalition two weeks earlier, for help, which the IF rejected as it refused to fight al-Nusra. The IF offered to raise its flag over the warehouses to protect it from attack, before proceeding to storm the warehouses and capture them from SMC units, the SMC-affiliated Ahfad al-Rasul Brigades, and ISIL. Following the takeover, the US and UK announced that they would temporarily suspend their supplies of non-lethal equipment for the SMC through the crossing.

On 16 February 2014, the Supreme Military Council announced that Idris was replaced with Colonel Abdul-Ilah al-Bashir, head of the FSA's Quneitra Military Council. 4 months later on 26 June 2014, Abdullah al-Bashir was sacked by the SNC, and SNC's chief, Ahmad Tohme, said in a statement that he "disbanded the Supreme Military Council".

On June 27, 2014, the Syrian National Coalition made the decision to disband the SMC and sack Abdul-Ilah al-Bashir. However this decision would be annulled by the leader of the SNC, Ahmed al-Jarba.

On 25 September 2014, according to CNN, Bashir led the Supreme Military Council in forming an alliance with the Syriac Military Council against the Syrian government and ISIL.

By April 2015, Ahmed Berri had reached the position of Deputy Chief of staff for the Free Syrian Army, presumably under Bashir.

In July 2015, the SMC met with several other opposition leaders in Hatay, hoping to form a High Military council to further unify the opposition. During the meeting, the SMC was led by Abdulkerim el Ahmed, who described himself as the commander-in-chief of the FSA. This notion would be disputed by the SNC, as they declare that Ahmed Berri was the concurrent commander in chief, with Bashir having seemingly been replaced sometime between April and July. The SNC further stated that they had no connection with the meeting at Hatay.

The leadership dispute would seemingly never be resolved, as the SMC would go dark following this point, and the FSA as a whole would continue to decentralize further.

== See also ==
- Armed factions in the Syrian civil war
