= Fauzi Ayub =

Lebanese-Canadian member of Hezbollah

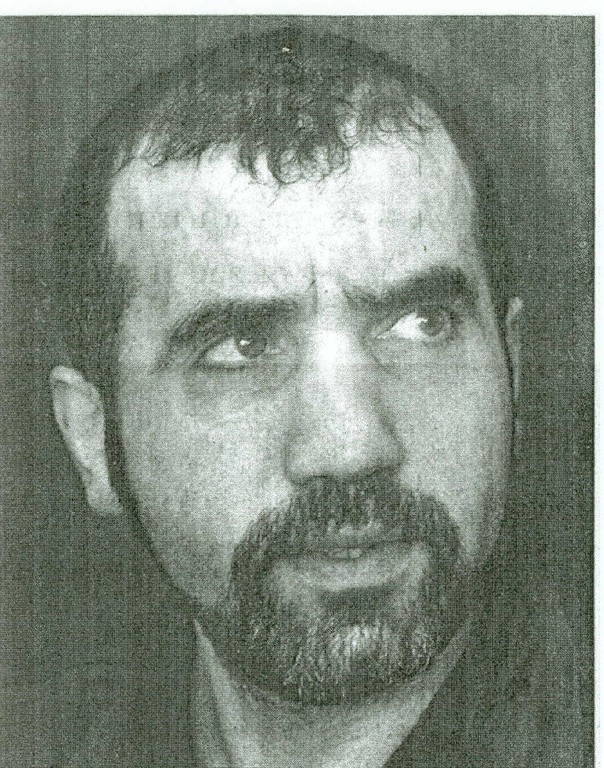
Black-and-white mugshot of Faouzi Ayoub (2011)

Fauzi Mohammed Ayub (Arabic: فوزي محمد أيوب), (also Fawzi), (5 October, 1966 – May 2014) was a Lebanese-Canadian who was a member of Hezbollah and arrested in 2002 by the Israeli Defence Forces. Two years later he was released to his wife and three children in Lebanon in a prisoner exchange that saw 436 Palestinians and Lebanese released in exchange for Elhanan Tannenbaum and the bodies of three Israeli soldiers abducted four years earlier.

His arrest brought debate to Canada over whether to declare Hezbollah a "terrorist" organisation, and whether to continue judging its military branch separately from its political and social service branches.

He was killed in May 2014 while fighting in the Syrian Civil War by a Free Syrian Army ambush in the Battle of Aleppo (2012–2016).

== Life ==
I saw dead people, women and children. It affected me. I saw that the miserable ones have to be protected.

— Fauzi Ayub, before an Israeli court

Ayub joined the Amal Movement in 1975 while studying, claiming that it was necessary to protect his family. In 1983, he formally joined Hezbollah, and three years later was part of a hijacking plot that targeted Iraqi Airways Flight 163 in Romania, hoping to exchange the airline hostages for Lebanese prisoners held by Iraq. However, the man designated to hand over small firearms to Ayub's group in the airport, named Sh'alan, was arrested, and confessed to the plot - leading Romanian authorities to immediately arrest Ayub when he entered the building. However, a second wave team targeted the same flight the following day and successfully hijacked it, although it crashed in the Arabian Desert, killing 62 people aboard.

Ayub was sentenced to 7 years' imprisonment, but was released after only ten months.

== Life in Canada ==
In 1988, his uncle sponsored him to move to Canada under the auspice of a program designed specifically for displaced Lebanese to immigrate to the country. He received his Canadian citizenship four years later.

He married a woman from Detroit, and began working at a grocery store, while taking night courses at University.

In 1994, his marriage fell apart due to arguments concerning his wife's desire to avoid having children; he remarried a Lebanese woman, and they had a son, Abbas, the following year. In 1997, a second son, Mohamed, was also born. He found work at a computer company, but moved back to Lebanon in 2000, citing his wife's unhappiness away from their home country. A third child was also born to the couple.

== Return to Lebanon ==
After returning to Lebanon, Ayub and his wife opened a bakery and ran a construction supply outlet, but his businesses began to falter, and the family found themselves in increasing debt. Around this time, he was contacted by old friends in Hezbollah who suggested there was still a place for him in the organisation.

Several months later, Ayub flew from Lebanon to Greece, and there obtained a forged American passport under the name Frank Bushy with which he sailed to Haifa, Israel in October 2000. Upon arriving in Israel, he headed for the West Bank.

While in the West Bank, he launched a failed attempt to free three prominent prisoners, Mustafa Dirani, Abdel Karim Obeid and Jihad Shuman, leaving twelve people dead.

In late 2002, Ayub was questioned by Israeli authorities, and explained he was in the region to help oppressed Muslims as a volunteer.

He was arrested on June 25 after Israeli forces stormed the police station where he was located, and Canada was informed of his arrest eight days later. He received three consular visits from Canada, and was tried in Tel Aviv district court by judge Zacharia Caspi.
