= Salim Idris =

Syrian military officer (born 1958)

- سليم إدريس
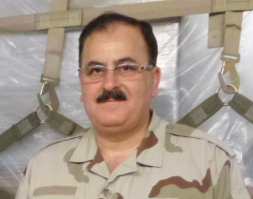

Defense Minister of the Syrian Interim Government
- In office 31 August 2019 – 15 November 2021
- Preceded by: Jawad Abu Hatab
- Succeeded by: Hassan Hamada

Personal details
- Born: 1958 (age 67–68) Al-Mubarakiya, Homs Governorate, Syria

Military service
- Allegiance: Syria (2025–present); Formerly: Ba'athist Syria (1979-July 2012); (Syrian opposition) Syrian National Coalition (December 2012– February 2025); (Syrian opposition) Syrian Interim Government (2016-2021)
- Branch/service: Syrian Army (1979 – July 2012); Free Syrian Army (July 2012–2016) Syrian National Army (2016–2021)
- Years of service: 1979–2021
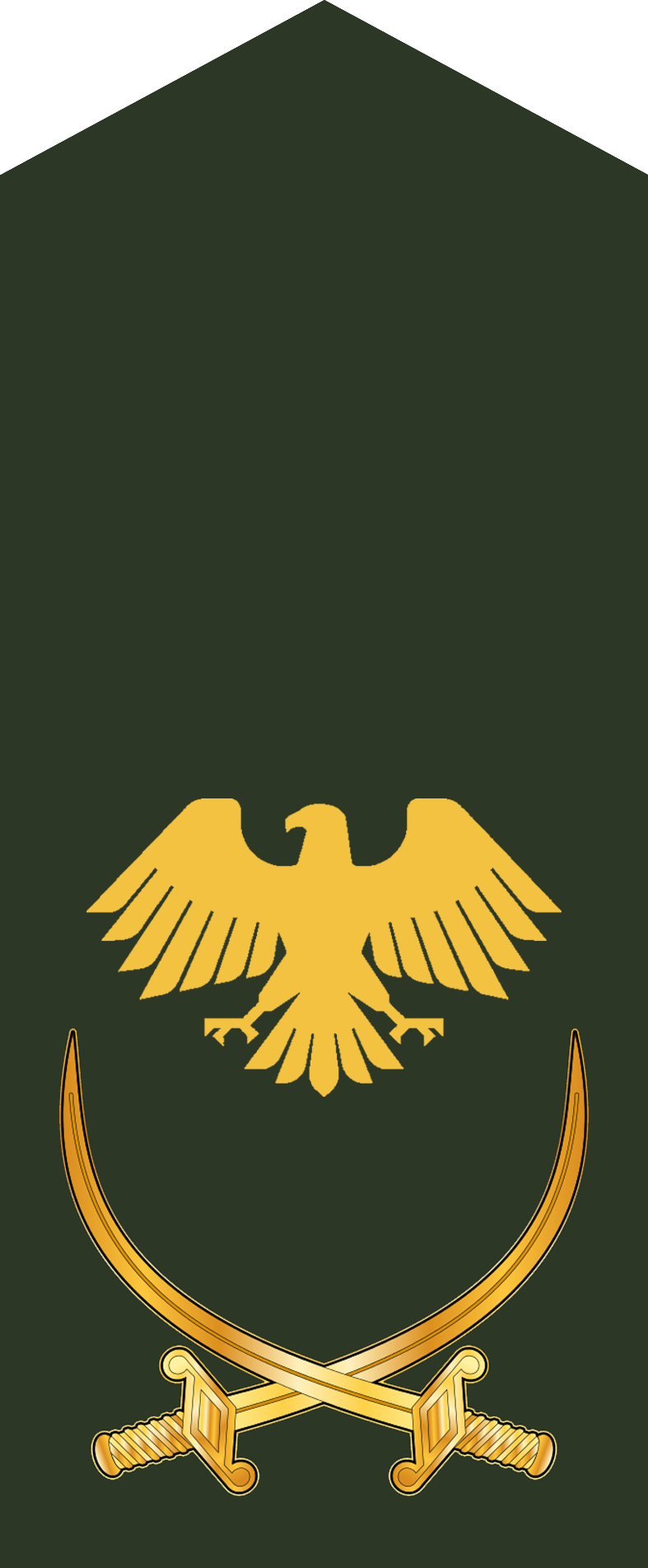
- Rank: Major general
- Unit: Corps of Engineers
- Battles/wars: Syrian Civil War; Daraa offensive (February–May 2014); 2019 Turkish offensive into north-eastern Syria; Northwestern Syria offensive (December 2019–March 2020)

Salim Idris (Arabic: سليم إدريس, romanized: Salīm Idrīs; born 1958) is a Syrian military officer and former rebel leader during the Syrian Civil War. He served as the minister of defense of the Syrian Interim Government and chief of staff of the Supreme Military Council (SMC) of the Syrian National Army, a Syrian rebel faction.

He has a PhD in electrical engineering and speaks five languages, including English. An East German-trained electronics professor, he was a brigadier general in the Syrian Army when he defected in July 2012. During the civil war against the Assad regime, Idris was widely considered to represent the moderate elements of the Syrian opposition, as armed opposition leaders under his leadership subscribed to the pro-democracy Proclamation of Principles.

== Military activities ==
Idris was elected as the Chief of Staff of the Supreme Military Council following its establishment in a conference held in Turkey on 15 December 2012. At the conference, over 550 members of the Syrian revolutionary council, brigades, and battalion commands elected 261 representatives to form the Revolutionary Force Authority. Thirty members were elected to form the SMC, which includes five combat Fronts covering Syria's 14 provinces.

In December 2013, Idris was initially reportedly driven out of his headquarters in northern Syria by the Islamic Front into exile in Doha, Qatar, but U.S. officials later said he was in Turkey throughout the incursion. However, the FSA has denied that Idris has left Syria. A few days later, Syrian National Coalition (SNC) Chief of Staff Monzer Akbik said that Idris "has failed to make an institution, I don't think everything can continue in the same way."

Idris was removed from his position as Chief-of-Staff of the FSA's Supreme Military Council in an announcement on 16 February 2014. He was replaced by Brigadier General Abdul-Ilah al-Bashir al-Noeimi.

== Political activities ==
Idris has become increasingly engaged with soliciting aid from Western nations since his initial request of specialized training and non-lethal material support from the United States in February 2013. On 30 April 2013 the United States began deliveries of ready-to-eat rations and Warrior Aid and Litter Kits (WALK) to the Free Syrian Army under the oversight of Idris, in what was the first U.S. delivery of tangible aid to Syria's armed opposition.

In May 2013, U.S. Senator John McCain crossed into Syria from Turkey to meet with Idris. Idris has issued letters and statements to Secretary of State John Kerry, President Barack Obama, and the United Nations Security Council to encourage international intervention and support in the ongoing Syrian Civil War. In an 8 June 2013 interview with The New York Times, Idris outlined that continued international support for the Free Syrian Army, including "game-changing weapons," were required as a precondition for his attendance at planned negotiations with Bashar al-Assad in Geneva.

On 31 August 2019, Idris was appointed to the post of Minister of Defence of the Syrian Interim Government and was thus appointed as commander-in-chief of the Syrian National Army. As such, he led the SNA into the 2019 Turkish offensive into north-eastern Syria, alongside the Turkish Armed Forces. Idris stated that Turkey-backed Syrian rebels "stand in full force in support of our Turkish brothers in fighting all forms of terrorism represented by the PKK gangs." He was replaced by Hassan Hamada on 15 November 2021.

On 9 October 2025, following the fall of the Assad regime, he was appointed as advisor to the National Academy of Military Engineering.

Military offices
Preceded by Riad al-Asaad	Commander of the Free Syrian Army; 8 December 2012 – 16 February 2014	Succeeded by Abdul-Ilah al-Bashir
