= Battle of Al-Shaykh Maskin (2014) =

Military operation

Battle of Al-Shaykh Maskin (2014) معركة الشيخ مسكين (2014)
- Part of the Syrian Civil War
- Map showing the rebel advances and government counterattacks
Date	1 November 2014 – 15 December 2014 (1 month and 2 weeks)
Location	Daraa Governorate, Syria
Result	Rebel victory

Belligerents
Southern Front; Al-Nusra Front	(Syria) Syrian Arab Republic: Syrian Armed Forces; National Defence Force; Hezbollah; Kata'ib Sayyid al-Shuhada

Commanders and leaders
Brig. Gen. Ibrahim Fahad Al Naimi (Southern Command commander); Gen. Assad al Zubi; Capt. Abdul Hakim (Lions of Islam Brigade commander); Abu Humam Jazrawi † (local Nusra leader)	Col. Mohammad Jaber (Suqur al-Sahara commander); Hassan Hazbawi † (IRGC 64th Artillery Group); Unknown Hezbollah leader †

Units involved
Southern Front: Southern Command; First Corps; Liwa Burj al-Islam; Lions of Islam Brigade; Syria Revolutionaries Front; Yarmouk Martyrs Brigade; Two al-Nusra battalions	5th Mechanized Division: 12th Brigade; 175th Brigade; 7th Mechanized Division: 69th Brigade; Suqur al-Sahara

Strength
Unknown	1,900+ fighters (reinforcements)

Casualties and losses
200 killed (pro-government claim; by 10 November)	58 killed (pro-government claim; by 10 November)

The Battle of Al-Shaykh Maskin (Arabic: معركة الشيخ مسكين الأولى) was a military engagement during the Syrian civil war in the Daraa Governorate, where Syrian government forces attempted to capture Al-Shaykh Maskin to secure the Daraa–Damascus highway. Two days later, rebel forces launched two joint offensives, code-named "Edkholo Alayhem al-Bab" (Enter upon them through the gate) and "Hadm al-Jedar" (Demolition Of The Wall), to take control of Al-Shaykh Maskin and the nearby town of Nawa.

== The battle ==
=== Initial Syrian Army assault ===
Situation in Shaykh Maskin, before the battle

On the morning of 1 November 2014, the Army attacked the town, quickly capturing the majority of the eastern part of the town after the rebels retreated towards the cemetery in the Eastern District. By the early afternoon, government forces had secured the cemetery, thus taking control of the whole Eastern District. They then pressed forward towards the Western District and captured the city center.

=== FSA-led offensive ===
On 3 November, the rebels announced the beginning of the battle of "Edkholo Alayhem al-Bab", with the aim of controlling Al-Shaykh Maskin. Three days later, rebels advanced inside the town after they launched an operation to capture the strategic Tel Hamad hill base on the west side of the town, ending up controlling most of Shaykh Maskin, before the Army managed to recapture ground in the east and reached the town cemetery. According to Al-Masdar news, Al-Jazeera correspondent Mohammad Nour was wounded on 7 November while covering the battle. It also claimed that the rebels retreated from the Southern District to Ibta'a and confirmed that the Army retreated from the checkpoints it captured in the Western District the day before. The next day, rebels captured the "8 March Tower" inside the town and Tell al-Hamad.

On 9 November, rebels captured the al-Hesh northern and southern hills, the Army training ground, al-Rahba battalion base, "al-Konkors" battalion base, the medical base, "al-Hejajia" tanks battalion base and Hawi checkpoint around the city of Nawa. Later that day, rebels took control over the entire city after the Army retreated towards Brigade 112 HQ base (located between the two towns) as well as Shaykh Maskin. Brigade 112 HQ was eventually captured by the rebels according to two Arab news agencies. Both local rebel groups and the al-Nusra Front claimed credit for the opposition advance. Syrian State Television "SANA" said troops were "redeploying and reorganizing in the Nawa area... in order to prepare for upcoming fighting." At the end of the day, the Army advanced inside Shaykh Maskin.

As of 10 November, according to a military source the Army was still present in the South and East Districts of Shaykh Maskin, and reportedly cleared the two besieged areas surrounding base 82 and Brigade 112. The next day, rebels advanced in Shaykh Maskin and took control of new positions and eventually captured the eastern neighborhood on 12 November. In response to the rebel gains, the Army decided to reassign the Suqur al-Sahara (Desert Falcons Special Forces Unit) led by col. Mohammad Jaber.

On 13 November, an Army convoy from Homs under command of Colonel Mohammad Jaber headed towards Nawa, Shaykh Maskin and Izraa. The reinforcements were described by Al-Masdar as much-needed as the Army lacked the manpower to conduct counter-attacks to restore lost ground in the province of Daraa. The next day, rebels announced the start of the second phase of the offensive in Shaykh Maskin against the Brigade 82 main base, the eastern neighborhood, al-Jardat and al-Sakran buildings, the northern checkpoint and the officers housings. That day, rebels advanced in the Brigade 82 area of Shaykh Maskin.

On 15 November, rebels took wide parts of the al-Dalli area (north of Shaykh Maskin) as the Army retreated from it. At least 11 rebels were killed that day. The next day, rebels captured the 60th Battalion base near al-Seheleyyi and al-Dalli villages.

On 17 November, Al-Masdar reported that the Army recaptured the village of al-Dalli and Tal ‘Areed (hill). The recapture of the hill was confirmed by pro-opposition sources. Al-Masdar also claimed that the Army ambushed a large al-Nusra contingent in the Northern District of Shaykh Maskin.

As of 18 November, the Syrian rebels were "slowly" capturing the Daraa Governorate and seized the headquarters of the 82 Brigade Base.

=== Syrian Army counter-offensive ===
In late November, heavy fighting took place in Shaykh Maskin after the Army launched a counter-offensive, supported by Hezbollah, to recapture lost ground.

On 25 November, a military source reported that the 12th Brigade of the 5th Division of the Syrian Army had re-established their supply route in the strategic town of Sheikh Miskeen after recapturing the Nawa-al-Dawaar road. The source also claimed that a large number of Al-Nusra fighters, including the leader of "Kateeb Ansar Al-Shariah" (Nusra offshoot) Sami Al-Safadi and 16 others were killed in the area and that three T-55 tanks, taken from the Army in Nawa, were destroyed. On the same day, the same military source claimed that the 175th Brigade was on the outskirts of Nawa, where it looked to breach "Jabhat Al-Nusra" defenses and recapture the surrounding hills overlooking this large city in the Daraa province. However, opposition news agent SLN News claimed that the rebels repelled the army attack from the eastern district of Shaykh Maskin, leaving "scores" of pro-government fighters dead.

On 26 November, a Hezbollah military leader was killed in Shaykh Maskin, according to the SOHR.

On 30 November, Army units recaptured the eastern neighborhood of Sheikh Miskeen, forcing the rebels to pull back to the rear-lines of defense. That day, local Iranian media announced the burial of the Hassan Hazbawi, the second highest-ranking commander from Khuzestan province killed in Syria. He was killed in Daraa.

By 3 December, the Army, backed by Hezbollah and Iraqi volunteers, was gaining ground in Sheikh Miskeen and controlled the northeast neighborhoods and the area east of the town on the road to Izraa. A reporter of the pro-opposition news agency Syria Mubasher accused the Army of using "human shields". Later that day, rebels reportedly advanced in the military housing area. Seven rebels, including a brigade commander, were killed.

=== Rebel counter-offensive ===
Situation in Shaykh Maskin, after the battle

On 7 December, the al-Nusra Front detonated two car-bombs in the military housing area—resulting in an advance for the rebels in the area and the eventual capture of the military housing by rebel forces. One of the armored cars used in the attack previously belonged to the U.N. UNDOF mission. According to the al-Nusra media outlet, the driver made it safely back; the vehicle was remotely detonated after it was parked near the officers' quarters.

On 9 December, two reporters and a cameraman of the pro-opposition Orient TV were killed in the town after their car was hit by a rocket.

On 15 December, Syrian intelligence official, General Rustom Ghazaleh destroyed his own villa in the nearby village of Garfa as rebels were approaching it after they captured the eastern district of Sheikh Maskin in a recent push.

== Aftermath ==
More than a month later, rebel forces launched a new offensive and subsequently captured the Brigade 82 base and overran most of Al-Shaykh Maskin.

== See also ==
- Daraa Governorate campaign
- Battle of Al-Shaykh Maskin (2015–16)
