= Daraa offensive (February–June 2017) =

Military operation

- Part of the Daraa Governorate campaign of the Syrian Civil War
- Map of the situation in Daraa city, as of 21 April 2017
Date	First Phase: 12 February – 8 March 2017 (3 weeks and 3 days); Second Phase: 6–26 April 2017 (2 weeks and 6 days); Third Phase: 24 May – 6 June 2017 (1 week and 6 days)
Location	Daraa, Daraa Governorate, Syria
Result	Rebel victory: Rebels initially captures a large part of the al-Manishiyah District, but the offensive soon stalled; The Syrian Army recaptures almost all lost positions, leaving less than 25% of al-Manishiyah rebel-held; Renewed rebel attack leaves the rebels in control of 95% of al-Manishiyah

Belligerents
al-Bunyan al-Marsous Operations Room: Hay'at Tahrir al-Sham; Ahrar al-Sham; (Syrian opposition) Free Syrian Army; Jaysh al-Islam; Jabhat Ansar al-Islam; Alwiya al-Furqan; (Islamic State) Jamaat Bayt al-Maqdis al-Islamiya	(Syria) Syrian Arab Republic: Syrian Armed Forces; Iran; Russia; Hezbollah; Fatah al-Intifada

Commanders and leaders
Ibrahim Abdullah (senior rebel commander); Abu Shaimaa (Banyan al-Marsous operations room spokesman & commander) (Syrian opposition) Umran Tawfiq Al-Amri †(Ahfad Al-Rasoul Brigade commander)	(Syria) Brig. Gen. Issa Abdul Karim Mohammed † (Syria) Unidentified Syrian Army lieutenant colonel (executed) (Iran) Col. Mustafa Zal Nejad † (IRGC commander)

Units involved
(Syrian opposition) Free Syrian Army; Southern Front; Alliance of Southern Forces; Omari Brigades; Free Nawa Division; Houran Column Division; Revolution Army; Mu'tazz Billah Army; First Corps; Dawn of Liberation Division; Youth of Sunna Forces; Southern Brigades; Aisha, Mother of Believers Brigade; 18 March Division; Engineering and Rocket Battalion; Army of Free Tribes; Ahrar al-Sham	Syrian Armed Forces; Syrian Army; 5th Armoured Division; 15th Mechanized Brigade; Republican Guard; Syrian Air Force; National Defence Forces; (Iran) IRGC; IRGC Ground Forces; Syrian auxiliaries; 313 Battalion; Ali Sultan Battalion; Russian Armed Forces; Russian Air Force

Casualties and losses
278+ killed (per gov. sources)	~300 killed, 500+ wounded (per the rebels)
- 12+ civilians killed

The Daraa offensive (February–June 2017), code named as the battle of "Death Rather than Humiliation" (Arabic: الموت ولا المذلة) by the rebels, was a military operation launched by Syrian rebels against positions of the Syrian Arab Army in the Manshiyah District of Daraa city, in southern Syria, during the Syrian Civil War.

== Background ==
In the first half of 2016, heavy fighting had taken place between (and also within) factions connected to ISIS, on one side, and Jabhat al-Nusra and Free Syrian Army factions, on the other. At the end of this period, the rebels emerged victorious but ISIS had made some advances. Several rebel groups formed the al-Bunyan al-Marsous Operations Room (BM) in June 2016, composed of several Southern Front factions and Islamist groups Jaish al-Islam, Ahrar al-Sham and a small al-Nusra contingent. In February 2017, this coalition (with al-Nusra now re-constituted as Tahrir al-Sham or HTS) started advancing on government-held territory in Daraa.

== The offensive ==
=== Initial rebel gains ===
On 12 February 2017, two suicide bombers from Hayat Tahrir al-Sham, at least one of them a Jordanian foreign fighter, launched two car bombs at Syrian Army positions in the Al-Manshiyah district of southern Daraa city. Syrian government sources reported that both vehicles were destroyed before they could reach their target, while the rebel coalition al-Bunyan al-Marsous Operations Room (BM) claimed four government fighters were killed. The frontlines in the city were lined with fortifications, and the rebels did not make any gains. The Army launched artillery and "Elephant" lob bombs at rebel positions after they repelled the assault.

On 13 February, the rebels claimed to have captured several buildings in Manshiyah. After the rebel advance, the Russian Air Force conducted dozens of airstrikes on rebel positions in Daraa. The next day, the Army launched a counter-attack that they said resulted in the recapture of several points in Manshiyah. By 14 February BM had claimed to have captured significant territory, including Manshiyah Mosque, and that Hezbollah and National Defense Force reinforcements arrived in the city.

On 15 February, Tahrir al-Sham fighters captured some areas in the northeastern part of Manshiyah; however, later in the day the Army said it had recaptured all of the lost points and launched a counter-offensive capturing the eastern part of the district. According to Farhan Haq, deputy spokesman for the UN Secretary General, over 9,000 civilians fled the city of Daraa as of 15 February. By 17 February, pro-government sources had reported 36 deaths on the pro-government side, including one Iranian and eleven officers, and the next day BM announced the successful completion of the “First Phase” of its offensive.

=== Offensive stalls and Army counter-attack ===
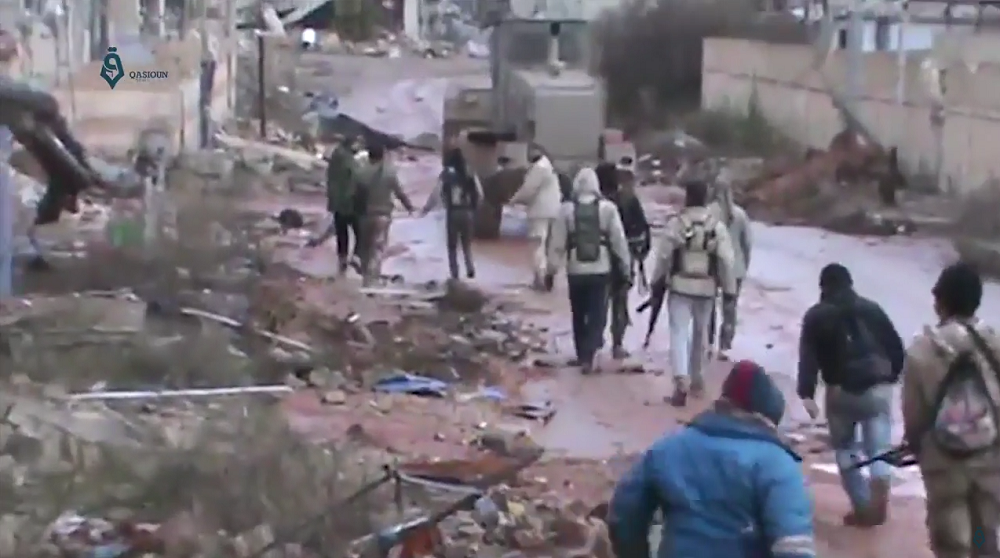
Rebel fighters advance in the al-Manshiyah District.

On 20 February, the rebels launched the "third phase" of their offensive with fighting intensifying. However, the same day, an Islamic State affiliate, the Khalid ibn al-Walid Army, took advantage of the rebels' redirection of personnel for the assault on Manshiyah and launched its own offensive west of Daraa against the rebels. The Khalid ibn al-Walid Army captured Tasil, as well as four other towns and villages and a hill. The rebels managed to recapture only two towns. Over a period of three days, 132 people were killed in the jihadi offensive, mostly combatants. Due to the attack on rebel positions, the offensive in Daraa city stalled.

The Syrian Army reportedly recaptured some positions in a joint Hezbollah, NDF, and 5th Armored Division counter-attack on 23 February. However, the same day, a rebel suicide-bomber blew himself up near an Army checkpoint amid a renewed rebel attempt to break through government fortifications in the city. The following day, the Russian Navy launched long-range ballistic missiles at rebel positions in the al-Bilad district in retaliation for the suicide-bombing.

On 24 February, a rebel Omar rocket strike targeted Muawiyas in the Manshiyah district; government sources claimed a school was destroyed. The same day, Republican Guard reinforcements arrived in Daraa, numbering 500 troops, ahead of a major Army counter-attack. Pro-rebel sources later claimed that Jordan expelled families of rebel fighters killed in the offensive.

On 5 March, the Army launched a new counter-attack, and reported capturing several buildings in Daraa Al-Bilad neighborhood, taking advantage of the lack of rebel manpower which was diverted to repel the Khalid ibn al-Walid Army's offensive. The next day, the 5th Armoured division of the Republican Guard recaptured a few building blocks in Manshiyah, thus almost completely reversing rebel gains made in February. The Army made additional gains in the Al-Bilad neighborhood and seized some areas around the Al-Musarif Roundabout on 8 March.

=== Interlude ===
On 12 March, BM announced the "fourth phase" of its offensive. The government reported that a rebel suicide car-bomber killed and injured several soldiers in Manshiyah. Following this, the rebels recaptured a building in the district. On 13 March, the rebels captured the Abu-alraha building block in Manshiyah. After this, fighting eased for some days, although BM continued to report minor territorial advances eastward.

On 16 March, the Syrian Army attacked multiple rebel-held districts of the city, reportedly killing at least 14 rebel fighters.

On 25 March, the government renewed its counter-attack. Artillery and missile attacks were launched by the Army in Daraa and its north-eastern countryside; according to pro-government sources these destroyed three rebel bases, resulting in the deaths of over 20 fighters. The following day, the 5th Division of the Republican Guard with the support of Hezbollah and the special forces of the 15th Division stormed Manshiyah, reportedly seizing numerous buildings and causing around 40 rebel casualties. BM, however, claimed there was no territorial change and released the names of new pro-government deaths in action, including a general from the 15th Suweida Paratroopers, a Colonel, and a Lieutenant.

On 27 March, BM again renewed its attack. Tahrir al-Sham fighters continued to attack Army positions in the Manshiyah neighborhood. The military was also attacking rebel positions throughout the city and the sporadic clashes continued into early April.

=== Renewed rebel offensive ===
On 4 April, BM launched a new eight-day assault on the southern and western sections of Manshiyah. BM media claimed multiple Hezbollah casualties, then on 5–6 April significant territorial gains and destruction of government military infrastructure. Both BM and government sources reported that the rebels detonatated a VBIED inside the government-held parts of the Manshiyah District on 6 April, killing scores of government troops and forcing them to retreat. A second VBIED hit another building in the same area. During the fighting the rebels seized three security buildings which served as HQ for the Syrian Army.

On 8 April, the rebels launched another assault on the Manshiyah District, capturing large parts of the district after a fierce battle. The rebels broke through the Army’s defenses around the western perimeter of the Manshiyah District, giving them the upper-hand in the battle and getting them close to capturing the district. By 9 April, rebels claim to have killed 103 Syrian government fighters, nine Hezbollah fighters, and one Iranian as well as destroyed six tanks and six Shilkas since 12 February.

Still, two days later, the Army reported it had launched a counter-attack supported by the Russian Air Force. Despite the Army's counter-attack, the rebels claimed they captured the "15 Residential Block" after hours of fierce fighting.

On 12 April, the rebels recaptured the territory they lost to the Army in their counter-attack, including several building blocks near the district’s center.

On 14 April, rebels launched a new 11-day offensive, with further advances in Manshiyah, capturing the Al-Maqsem Checkpoint and its nearby building blocks. By 15 April, the rebels were in control of between 70 and 90 percent of the Manshiyah district. However, government sources reported that further rebel progress was halted on 16 April by heavy Russian airstrikes.

On 18 April, the Army, backed by Russian airstrikes, launched a counter-offensive in the Manshiyah district, and reported recovering some points during the fighting. However, the rebels remained in control of over 60 percent of the district. Over the next two days, the rebels counter-attack continued and recaptured several positions, leaving them once again in control of 80 percent of Manshiyah.

On 25 April, the rebels started another attack on Army positions in the Manshiyah District by using an explosive hose. While the rebels failed to take the strategic Al-Arshadiyah Checkpoint, they did capture 12 buildings during the fighting. The next day, heavy artillery shelling and airstrikes reportedly caused heavy casualties among rebel forces.

On 5 May a ceasefire, brokered by Russia, comes into effect in four regions of Syria, including Dara’a, and fighting paused.

=== Final rebel push ===
Fighting broke out again on 17 May. Pro-government media reported a failed rebel offensive in which two HTS and one FSA Saif al Haq commander were killed, “Bilal Abu Zaid and Abu Hashem al-Tabuki (a Saudi national) of HTS, as well as Moetaz al-Nabwani.” BM claimed that the government attempted to regain lost positions under the cover of heavy shelling, calling the attack “a major breach of the agreement to ease the escalation” in the city. The Carter Center claimed that regime forces failed to advance in the district.

In late May, the rebels and a pro-opposition journalist reported that despite Russia's declaration of a "de-escalation zone" in the area multiple airstrikes were conducted on Daraa by pro-government forces.

On 24 May, the rebels captured 34 to 40 buildings in Manshiyah after they claimed to have repelled more than two Army attempts to advance in the district. In response to the rebels' advance, the Syrian Air Force launched 22 airstrikes on rebel-held positions. The latest advance reportedly left the rebels in control of 95 percent of Manshiyah.

On 2 June, BM reported a new government offensive and fierce fighting, but no territorial changes, while the following day pro-government media reported a new rebel attack in Manshiyah was repelled. Thirty-one fighters were killed on both sides amid the fighting, including 16 soldiers and 15 rebels. In retaliation for the attack, the Army heavily shelled rebel-held parts of the city the following day. It was also reported the shelling was part of preparations for an upcoming offensive against the rebels in Daraa Fighting continued up until 6 June.

== Aftermath – Government offensive ==
On 7 June, a Syrian Army offensive was launched against the rebels in Daraa city. However, frontlines remained unmoved by the end of June, and there was little significant fighting over the summer.

== See also ==
- Daraa Governorate campaign
