= Daraa offensive (January 2015) =

Syrian Civil War military operation

- Part of the Syrian Civil War
- Map of the battle for Shaykh Maskin
Date	24–31 January 2015 (1 week)
Location	Daraa Governorate, Syria
Result	Rebel victory: Rebels capture the Brigade 82 base and Shaykh Maskin; Army claims to have recaptured the Faroun Storage Facility, Oxygen Plant and Niqta Al-Masarat

Belligerents
Free Syrian Army; Islamic Front; Al-Nusra Front	(Syria) Syrian Arab Republic; Syrian Armed Forces; Syrian Army; National Defence Force; Hezbollah; Popular Mobilization Forces

Commanders and leaders
Brig. Ibrahim Fahad Al Naimi (Southern Command commander); Brig. Assad al Zubi; Col. Saber Safar; Capt. Abdul Hakim Eid (Black Islam Brigade commander)	Maj. Gen. Nadeem Squir Ayman † (Brigade 82 commander); Col. Mohammad Jaber (Suqur al-Sahara commander)

Units involved
Free Syrian Army; Southern Front; First Army; First Corps; Liwa Burj al-Islam; Black Islam Brigade; Southern Command; Two al-Nusra battalions	Syrian Armed Forces; Syrian Army; 5th Mechanized Division; 12th Brigade; 175th Brigade; 7th Mechanized Division; 69th Brigade; Suqur al-Sahara; Popular Mobilization Forces; Kata'ib Sayyid al-Shuhada

Strength
Hundreds	Unknown

Casualties and losses
77–97 killed	17+ killed

The Daraa offensive (January 2015), was a rebel offensive launched in Daraa Governorate during the Syrian Civil War, in an attempt to capture the remaining Army positions in Shaykh Maskin, and thus secure the Daraa–Damascus highway, and other positions in Daraa province.

== Rebel offensive ==
On 24 January 2015, the rebels announced three battles in Daraa Governorate:

- "Fidak Ya Rasola Allah", meaning "We can sacrifice our lives for you, Messenger of Allah", also known as "Victory only comes from Allah"
- "Kick their Doors in"
- "Charge of the United"

That day, 10 rebel fighters (including a field commander) were killed. The next day, rebels breached Brigade 82 and captured its HQ, with fighting ongoing around the area. According to the news agency Alaan, rebels also captured the radar base in the northwest of the town. At least 40 fighters from both sides were killed in the clashes. According to Al-Masdar News, 14 soldiers were killed before the Army retreated from Brigade 82. The rebels declared the town of Shaykh Maskin as "liberated" soon after the Army retreated from the base. According to Al-Arabiya news agency, rebels overran most of the town after they captured Brigade 82.

On 29 January, rebels advanced near Al-Suhayliyyeh and Dilli, capturing farms adjacent to the northern part of Shaykh Maskin. However, according to Al-Masdar, the Army recaptured the Faroun Storage Facility and positions in Dilli after these initial gains. The same source also claimed that the Army repelled a rebel attack on Al-Atash village. Two days later, the Army launched a counter-offensive on Brigade 82, claiming that it recaptured the Oxygen Plant and Niqta Al-Masarat and advanced to the base's northern entrance in its outskirts. However, the Army was forced to retreat from the north of the base "in order to regroup". Meanwhile, rebels advanced in Dilli village towards the centre. On 31 January, an Al Jazeera film crew visited the Brigade 82 radar base in the northwest of Shaykh Maskin, confirming that the base was taken during the initial phase of the offensive.

== See also ==
- Daraa Governorate campaign
- Battle of Al-Shaykh Maskin
