= Eastern Qalamoun offensive (April 2018) =

Military operation

- Part of the Rif Dimashq Governorate campaign (Syrian Civil War) and the Russian military intervention in the Syrian Civil War
- Map of the operation
Date	17–25 April 2018 (1 week and 1 day)
Location	Eastern Qalamoun Mountains, Rif Dimashq Governorate, Syria
Result	Decisive Syrian Army and allies victory: Syrian Army captures the entirety of the rebel-held eastern Qalamoun pocket; Rebels surrender and evacuate from eastern Qalamoun

Belligerents
(Syria) Syrian Arab Republic; Russia	Unified Military Command of Eastern Qalamoun (surrendered); Jaysh Tahrir al-Sham (surrendered); Hay'at Tahrir al-Sham (surrendered)

Commanders and leaders
(Syria) Maj. Gen. Suheil al-Hassan (Tiger Forces) (Syria) Col. Ghiath Dalla (42nd Armored Brigade)	Shaher Juma † (head of rebel negotiations committee in Dumayr)

Units involved
Syrian Armed Forces; Syrian Army; National Defence Forces; Syrian Air Force; Russian Armed Forces; Aerospace Forces; Special operations forces advisors	Unified Military Command of Eastern Qalamoun; Ahrar al-Sham; Jaysh al-Islam; Al-Rahman Legion; Forces of Martyr Ahmad al-Abdo; Lions of the East Army; Qaryatayn Martyrs Brigade

Strength
Unknown	1,500

On 17 April 2018, rebel groups in the eastern Qalamoun Mountains pocket, led by Jaysh al-Islam, reached a surrender agreement with the Syrian Army and Russia. The agreement came after 2 weeks of negotiations that began with a Syrian Army ultimatum on 3 April. Around 1,500 rebels handed over heavy weapons and equipment to the Syrian Army, and were evacuated by 124 buses in 4 convoys to Turkish-held areas in the northern Aleppo Governorate along with their families, totaling around 5,000 people. On 25 April, the last batch of rebels and their families left the eastern Qalamoun pocket, and the region came under full Syrian government control.

== Background ==
Rebels in the town of al-Dumayr and the rest of the eastern Qalamoun pocket have been in a state of ceasefire with government forces throughout 2016, with both sides focusing on fighting the Islamic State of Iraq and the Levant. In mid-2017, however government forces launched an offensive against rebels in the Syrian Desert to the east of the pocket, following a previous rebel offensive against ISIL in the region.

In late March 2018, the Levant Liberation Army launched an attack on Syrian Army positions in the eastern Qalamoun Mountains. This came amidst the Syrian Army offensive in eastern Ghouta.

== Rebel surrender and evacuation ==
On 3 April 2018, rebel groups in the eastern Qalamoun pocket formed a unified military command, which met with a Russian and Air Force Intelligence Directorate officer, the latter issued an ultimatum to the rebels, demanding that they either disarm and reconcile, or leave the eastern Qalamoun pocket entirely. The rebel committee refused to leave and demanded the release of prisoners. The Levant Liberation Army stated that it was not part of the unified military command, denied any coordination with it, and rejected negotiations with Russia. On 8 April, the rebel unified command again met with Russian and Syrian Army officers, and reached a preliminary agreement.

On 17 April, the government-run Syrian Arab News Agency announced that Jaysh al-Islam and the Forces of Martyr Ahmad al-Abdo in Dumayr have surrendered, and began to hand over heavy and medium weapons to the government. 5,000 people, which included 1,500 rebel fighters and 3,000 civilians, prepared to leave. Clashes also continued in the nearby mountains. On 18 April, Shaher Juma, head of the rebel negotiations committee in Dumayr, was assassinated by unidentified gunmen.

On 19 April, the rebel unified command agreed to hand over weapons and surrender the entire eastern Qalamoun pocket, including the towns of Dumayr, Jayrud, and al-Naseriyah. Russian officers pledged to pardon people who evaded conscription in the towns. The first batch of 2,500 people, including 600 rebels, were then transported by 44 buses from Dumayr to Jarabulus. The second convoy of at least 30 buses departed in the early hours of 22 April, and included 1,200 Tahrir al-Sham and Ahrar al-Sham fighters and their families, who arrived in the Afrin District. The 3rd convoy arrived in the al-Bab area on 24 April, and the 4th and final batch of 60 buses arrived in northern Aleppo on 25 April. With this, the eastern Qalamoun Mountains came under full government control, and the flag of the Syrian Arab Republic was raised in Jayrud's main square. Along with the territory, the Syrian Arab army said that it also gained back several heavy weapons including a dozen of tanks. After further territorial sweeps on 17 May, pro-government media reported that eight more tanks were found.

== See also ==
- Rif Dimashq Governorate campaign
- Eastern Qalamoun offensive (September–October 2016)
- Syrian Desert campaign (December 2016–April 2017)
- Syrian Desert campaign (May–July 2017)
- Rif Dimashq offensive (February–April 2018)
- Southern Damascus offensive (April 2018)
