= National Front for the Liberation of Syria =

Syrian rebel group

- الجبهة الوطنية لتحرير سوريا
- Leader: Muhammad Sufian Hassan
- Dates active: 22 July 2017 – July 2018
- Active regions: Daraa Governorate (2017–18); Quneitra Governorate (2017–18); Rif Dimashq Governorate (2017–18); Homs Governorate; Hama Governorate; Idlib Governorate
- Ideology: Syrian nationalism
- Size: 100+ officers, along with other members (initial strength)
- Part of: (Syrian opposition) Free Syrian Army
- Wars: the Syrian Civil War

The National Front for the Liberation of Syria (Arabic: الجبهة الوطنية لتحرير سوريا) was a Syrian rebel alliance formed in southwestern Syria. It was formed by 11 rebel groups on 22 July 2017 as a "unified national, military, and political unit" in the region.

On 16 August 2017, Muhammad Sufian Hassan, commander of the Dawn of Unity Division, was appointed as the commander of the National Front for the Liberation of Syria.

== Ideology ==
In its formation statement, the group supported the Syrian people's "right to self-determination" and rejected ideas that "contradict the interests of the revolution". It also rejected foreign involvement in the Syrian Civil War that are not consistent with the group's goals, and called on all opposition militias and political bodies in the region to unite. A number of the group's units were part of the Southern Front.

== Member groups ==
The groups in italic were part of the Southern Front. See Southern Front former groups for additional information.

- Jabhat Ansar al-Islam
- Martyr Majid al-Khatib Brigade
- Beit Sahem Hawks Brigade
- Soldiers of Asima Battalion
- Dawn of Unity Division
- 16th Special Forces Division
- Golan Hawks Brigade
- Desert Hawks Brigade
- Unity of Houran Battalions Brigade
- Sabtain Martyrs Brigade
- Saladin Division
- Shield of the Nation Brigade
- Damascus Martyrs Brigade
- Qadisiya Division
- Revolutionary Commando Division
- Freemen of the South Brigade
- 1st Commando Division
- Ahbab Omar Brigade
- Thunder Brigade
- Al-Musayfirah Martyrs Brigade
- 56th Infantry Brigade
- Western Miliha Martyrs Brigade
- al-Raya Brigade
- 1st Storm Brigade
- Houran Brigade
- Swords of Victory Brigade
- Punishment Brigade
- Lions of the Euphrates Gathering
- Martyr Abu Mansur al-Amel Brigade
- Kafar Shams Martyrs Brigade
- Free Golan Brigade
- Golan Commando Brigade
- Special Tasks Brigade
- Shield of the Revolution Brigade
- Free Yarmouk Brigade
- Supporters of Justice Union
- Revolutionary Commando Battalion
- al-Luj Hawks Brigade
- al-Naimi Commando Brigade
- Lions of War Battalion
- Al-Battar Brigade
- Badia Martyrs Brigade
- Khalid ibn al-Walid Battalion
- Bani Sakhr Battalion
- Anas ibn Malik Battalion
- Martyr Abu al-Zahra
- Martyr Ahmad al-Ahir
- Othman Bin Affan Brigade
- Lions of Clans
- Al-Naser Brigade
- Martyrs of al-Ghab
- Martyrs of Baarbo
- Men of God
- Hawks of al-Twina
- Omar ibn al-Khattab Brigade
- Wolves of Shaabsho
- Free Euphrates Brigades
- Revolutionary Council of Clans

== See also ==
- Alliance of Southern Forces
- Revolutionary Army (Syria)
