= Daraa Governorate campaign =

Syrian Army offensive

- Part of Syrian Civil War
Date	14 November 2011 – 7 December 2024 (13 years, 3 weeks and 2 days)
Location	Daraa Governorate, Syria
Status	Syrian opposition victory: Pro-government forces withdraw to Damascus Governorate; Southern rebels from Daraa, Suwayda and Quneitra form a military alliance called the Southern Operations Room
Territorial changes	Rebels fully capture both the Daraa Governorate and Quneitra region.

Belligerents
(Syria) Syrian Arab Republic; Iran; Russia; Palestine Liberation Army; Hezbollah; LAAG Support: Iraq; Lebanon	(Syrian opposition) Free Syrian Army; Southern Operations Room (since 2024); Hay'at Tahrir al-Sham (since 2017); Al-Nusra Front (until 2017); Ahrar al-Sham; Jaysh al-Islam; Al-Bunyan al-Marsous Operations Room	Islamic State of Iraq and the Levant (ISIL): Khalid ibn al-Walid Army; Wilayat Hawran

The Daraa Governorate campaign was a military campaign in the Syrian Civil War for the control of the southern Syrian Daraa Governorate (province) between the Syrian Armed Forces and the Syrian opposition, which ended with the capture of the province by the Southern Operations Room.

== Offensives ==
- Daraa Governorate clashes (2011–13): Series of military clashes that started since the Civil Uprising phase of the Syrian Civil War in 2011, until late 2013. The FSA captures several districts.
- 2013 Daraa offensive: Launched by the Opposition to seize border areas in the governorate.
- Daraa offensive (October 2014): Rebels seize more Syrian Army-held territories.
- First Battle of Al-Shaykh Maskin: Rebels capture part of Al-Shaykh Maskin from the Syrian Arab Army.
- Daraa offensive (January 2015): Rebels finally capture all of Al-Shaykh Maskin.
- 2015 Southern Syria offensive: Syrian army retakes Deir al-Adas and surrounding areas.
- Battle of Bosra (2015): Rebels capture Bosra.
- Battle of Nasib Border Crossing: Rebels capture the Nasib Border Crossing and take control of the Syrian-Jordan border.
- Daraa and As-Suwayda offensive (June 2015): Rebel take Brigade 52, al-Rakham, al-Meleha al-Gharbia, al-Koum checkpoint, and Sakakah.
- Daraa offensive (June–July 2015): Syrian army withstand rebel attack across Daraa city.
- Second Battle of Al-Shaykh Maskin: The Syrian Government forces recapture Al-Shaykh Maskin from rebels control.
- Daraa offensive (March–April 2016): Rebels capture ISIL-controlled territory.
- Daraa offensive (February–June 2017): A joint Tahrir al-Sham, Jaish al-Islam, Ahrar al-Sham and Southern Front attack captures most of the al-Manishiyah District of Daraa city.
- Southwestern Daraa offensive (February 2017): ISIL captures rebel-controlled territory.
- Daraa offensive (June 2017): Syrian army captures at least 50% of the Daraa Refugee Camp.
- 2018 Southern Syria offensive: Syrian army captures majority of the Daraa province.
- Daraa insurgency (March 2020 Daraa clashes, 2021 Daraa offensive): An insurgency waged by rebel remnants in Daraa largely suppressed, only low level violence continues. Large-scale clashes occur in 2020 and 2021.
- Southern Syria offensive (2024): Southern Syrian opposition groups capture Daraa Governorate and As-Suwayda Governorate in Southern Syria, two southern provinces along the nation's border with Jordan.

Resume of Battles/Offensives from Rif Dimashq Governorate Campaign
Battle	Timespan	Government	Opposition	Civilians	Total
1st Daraa	14 November 2011 – 3 January 2013	526 killed	~950 killed	470 killed	~1,946 killed
2nd Daraa	3 March – 10 April 2013	10+ killed	40+ killed	29+ killed	79+ killed
3rd Daraa	3 – 6 October 2014	53+ killed	63+ killed	26+ killed	142+ killed
1st Al-Shaykh Maskin	1 November 2014 – 15 December 2014	58 killed	200 killed	Unknown	258+ killed
4th Daraa	24 – 31 January 2015	17+ killed	77–97 killed	Unknown	94-114+ killed
Daraa and As-Suwayda	9 – 18 June 2015	28–83 killed	36–125 killed	Unknown	64-208+ killed
5th Daraa	25 June – 10 July 2015	28–34+ killed	200+ killed	11 killed	239-245+ killed
2nd Al-Shaykh Maskin	27 December 2015 – 25 January 2016	98 killed	210 killed	Unknown	308+ killed
6th Daraa	21 March – 8 April 2016	None (Did not participate in offensive)	93 killed (Includes rebels and ISIS)	25 killed	118 killed
7th Daraa	12 February – 8 March 2017 (First phase) 6–26 April 2017 (Second phase) 24 May – 6 June 2017 (Third phase)	~300 killed	278+ killed	12+ killed	590+ killed
8th Daraa	20 – 27 February 2017	None (Did not participate in offensive)	210+ killed (Includes rebels and ISIS)	9 killed	219+ killed
9th Daraa	7 – 23 June 2017	27–40 killed	19+ killed	88+ killed	134-147+ killed
Southern Syria offensive	18 June – 31 July 2018	309 killed	515 killed	236 killed	1,060 killed
Total Casualties	14 November 2011 – 31 July 2018	1,454–1,528+ killed	2,891–3,000+ killed (+439 ISIL and unknown forces killed)	906 killed+	5,251-5,434 killed+
