= Daraa offensive (June 2017) =

Military operation

- Part of the Daraa Governorate campaign of the Syrian Civil War
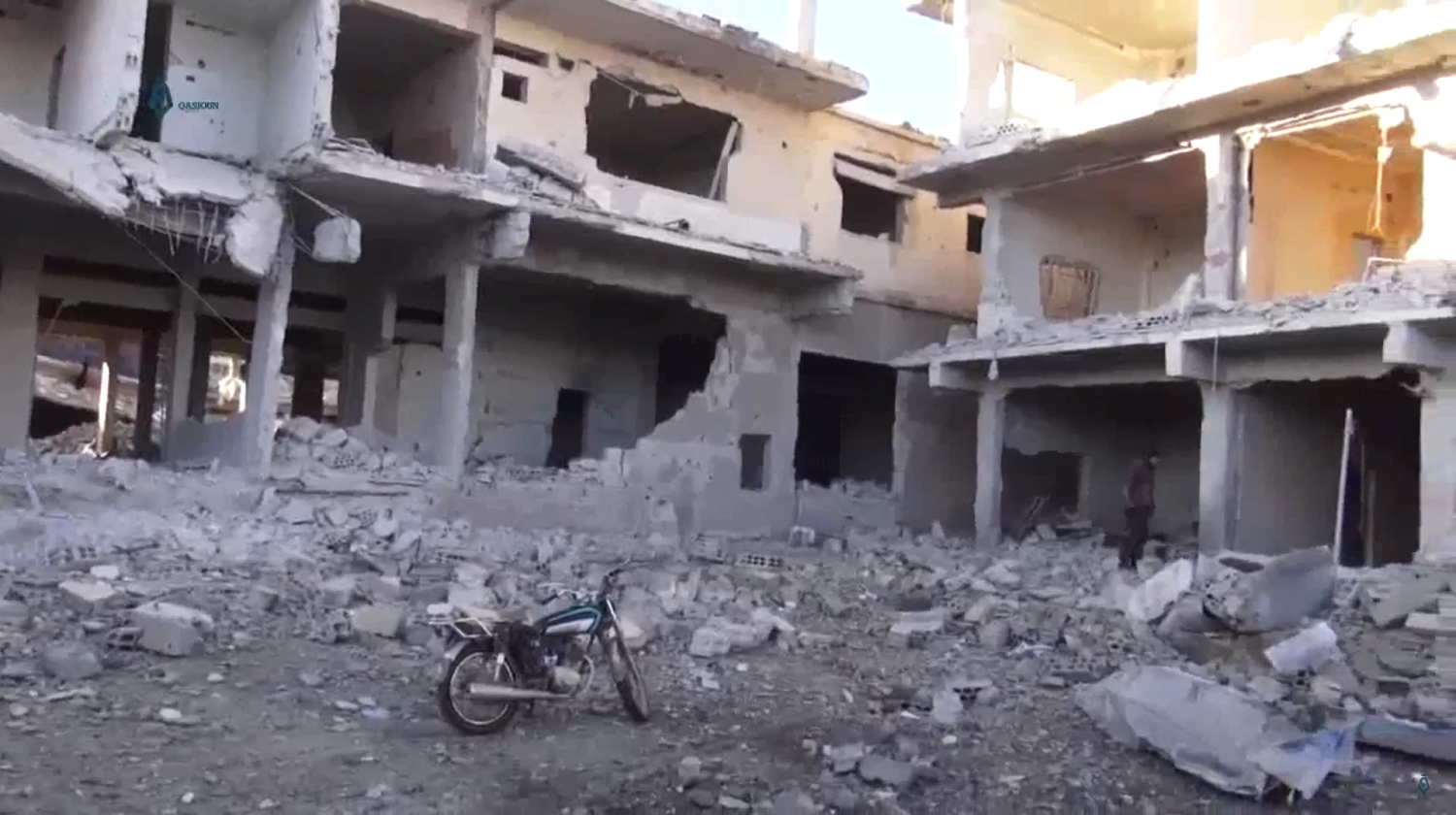
- Area of al-Balad district, Daraa, that was destroyed during the offensive
Date	7–23 June 2017 (2 weeks and 2 days)
Location	Daraa, Daraa Governorate, Syria
Result	Indecisive: Syrian Army captures at least 50% of the Daraa Refugee Camp

Belligerents
(Syria) Syrian Arab Republic: Syrian Armed Forces; Iran; Russia; Allied militias: Hezbollah; Lebanese Ba'ath Party; Liwa Fatemiyoun	al-Bunyan al-Marsous Operations Room: Tahrir al-Sham; Ahrar al-Sham; (Syrian opposition) Free Syrian Army; Jaysh al-Islam; Jabhat Ansar al-Islam; Alwiya al-Furqan; Jamaat Bayt al-Maqdis al-Islamiya; Soldiers of the Epic Battles

Commanders and leaders
Haidar Jalilund † (chief military adviser); Hussein Ali Rabiha † (Lebanese Ba'ath Party commander)	Ibrahim Abdullah (senior rebel commander); Abu Shaimaa (al-Bunyan al-Marsous operations room spokesman & commander)

Units involved
Syrian Army: 4th Armoured Division; 5th Armoured Division; 15th Mechanized Brigade; Republican Guard; Syrian Air Force; National Defence Forces (Iran) Iranian Armed Forces: IRGC; IRGC Ground Forces; Russian Armed Forces: Russian Air Force	Southern Front: 18 March Division; Engineering and Rocket Battalion; Tahrir al-Sham: Jabhat Fatah al-Sham

Strength
Unknown c. 400 Lebanese Ba'ath Party fighters (alleged)	Unknown

Casualties and losses
17+ killed (pro-rebel claim by 13 June)	Unknown

The Daraa offensive (June 2017) was a military operation launched by the Syrian Arab Army and allies against rebel positions in the southern half of Daraa city. Rebels and government forces fought for control of the city's Palestinian refugee camp, a built-up residential area of the city.

== Background ==
In mid-February 2017, the Syrian rebels launched a major offensive against government forces in Daraa city. Rebels initially captured a large part of the al-Manshiyah District, but the offensive soon stalled. By mid-March, the Syrian Army claimed to have regained almost all of the positions it had lost, with less than 25% of Manishiyah remaining under rebel control. However, a renewed rebel attack in early April left the rebels in control of 80% of Manshiyah. Fighting continued, with multiple airstrikes on Daraa by pro-government forces in mid-May. By the end of May, rebel control had extended to a reported 95%.

On 3 June, the rebels launched a new attack in Manshiyah, but were repelled. In retaliation for the attack, the Army heavily shelled rebel-held parts of the city the following day. The shelling was part of preparations for an upcoming offensive against the rebels in Daraa, and the government deployed forces including Hezbollah and Shiite Iraqi militias as well as the army's elite 4th Armored Division. What followed has been described as "two weeks of some of the most intense aerial bombardments and clashes the city has seen since 2015."

== The offensive ==
The offensive began on 7 June, with more than 20 airstrikes, as well as surface-to-surface missiles, hitting the rebel strongholds of Daraa al-Balad and al-Sad Road. Final preparations were also concluded for a ground attack with the arrival of the Syrian Army's Fourth Division.

Between 10 and 11 June, five FSA commanders were reported killed in Daraa. According to pro-government sources, some of these were as a result of a direct rocket strike on a rebel headquarters amid an intensified bombing campaign by the Army. On 11 June, government forces reportedly made their first territorial advance by capturing most of the School Complex area in the Daraa Camp suburb, a former Palestinian refugee camp.

On 12 June, vicious fighting took place in the Palestinian camp, with reports stating the Syrian Army had captured between 30% and 50% of the neighborhood. Rebel forces responded with mortar shelling of government-held neighborhoods of the city. On the same day, a government missile hit the civil defense center in the city, rendering the building and one ambulance inoperable, according to the Syrian Network for Human Rights. Opposition activists launched the "Act for Daraa" social media campaign that day.

It was reported by Al-Araby Al-Jadeed that in the first week of the offensive, government forces had dropped more than 300 barrel bombs and fired 350 surface-to-surface missiles on the rebel-held part of the city. On 14 June, citizen journalists reported 10–12 civilians killed in Syrian-Russian airstrikes and artillery attacks that hit a school housing IDPs, in Tafas, on the northern edge of Daraa, a strike later verified by Human Rights Watch.

The Syrian Army announced a 48-hour truce at noon on 17 June. In the two-week period up til then, government forces were alleged by Syria Civil Defence to have carried out 645 barrel-bomb attacks, 199 airstrikes, 645 mortar attacks and 91 napalm rocket attacks, causing the death of at least 88 civilians, including 18 children and seven women.

After the truce expired on 20 June, air strikes and artillery fire against rebel-held areas of Daraa city resumed. The Army renewed its efforts to break rebel lines in the east of the city and in the old quarter – with aerial support from Russian forces, according to rebel sources. Clashes also took place near a former air defence base southwest of the city and near the border with Jordan, which was briefly captured by government forces, potentially splitting rebel territory in the Daraa Governorate in two, but were repelled.

On 23 June, an attempt at a reconciliation deal fell apart, thus the Syrian Army resumed their offensive in the Palestinian Camp district, accompanied by airstrikes. Rebels affiliated to the al-Bunyan al-Marsous Operations Room claimed to have stormed the SAA 4th Division headquarters, with multiple casualties.

In early July, the government announced a ceasefire in the region. This was formalised on 7 July. However, there was government shelling in the town of Saida in eastern Daraa overnight on 9 July, according to the Syrian Observatory on Human Rights, as well as rebels/government exchange of fire in the village of Al Naeema, shelling of the Al-Balad area in Daraa province, and brief clashes in Daraa city. A barrel bomb was reported by opposition media activists the following day.
