= Quneitra offensive (June 2017) =

Military operation

- Part of the Syrian Civil War and Israeli–Syrian military incidents during the Syrian Civil War
Date	24 June – 1 July 2017 (1 week)
Location	Madinat al-Baath, Quneitra Governorate, Syria
Result	Syrian government victory

Belligerents
Syrian Opposition; (Syrian opposition) Free Syrian Army; Hay'at Tahrir al-Sham; Supported by: Israel	(Syria) Syrian Government

Commanders and leaders
Abu Osamah Al-Karar †; Duraid al-Shuneibli †	Unknown

Units involved
(Syrian opposition) Free Syrian Army; Southern Front; (Syrian opposition) Alliance of Southern Forces; 46th Infantry Division; (Syrian opposition) Revolutionary Army; (Syrian opposition) Quneitra Military Council; Grandsons Brigade; Southern Brigades; Tawhid Army; (Syrian opposition) Sword of al-Sham Brigades; Ezz Brigade; Alwiya al-Furqan; Golan Knights Brigade; Israel Defense Forces; Israeli Air Force	Syrian Armed Forces; Syrian Army; National Defence Forces; Golan Regiment; Quneitra Hawks Brigade; Syrian Air Force

Casualties and losses
(Syrian opposition) 75+ rebels killed (Syrian opposition) 150+ rebels wounded (per SAA)	(Ba'athist Syria) ~12 soldiers killed (per SAA) (Ba'athist Syria) 42–37 soldiers killed (per Bellingcat) (Ba'athist Syria) 120+ soldiers and militiamen killed (per the rebels)

The Quneitra offensive (June 2017), code-named "Road to Damascus", was a military operation launched by rebel forces against the Syrian Arab Army at the town of Madinat al-Baath, in the Quneitra Governorate, during the Syrian Civil War.

== The offensive ==
The offensive, by rebels organised in the Jaish al-Mohammed (Army of Mohammed) operations room, including the Salafist jihadist rebel group Tahrir al-Sham (HTS) as well as Free Syrian Army (FSA) fighters, was launched on 24 June, against Madinat al-Baath, also known as Baath City. HTS was reportedly the leading group in the offensive. As the attack was underway, Israeli warplanes bombed Syrian military positions at the entrance to the town, destroying a tank and a Shilka SPAAG according to the Syrian military. Israel stated the strikes were in retaliation for errant rocket fire that hit the Israeli-controlled part of the Golan Heights and that it destroyed two tanks, one as it was preparing to fire. Israeli journalist Ron Ben-Yishai reported the errant fire as notable for including an unusual number of "10 mortar shells and tank projectiles" landing in an open area in Israeli territory. As a result of the air-strikes, the rebels captured several positions near Baath City.

By the next day, government forces managed to recapture all lost positions. However, later in the day, Israel once again conducted air-strikes against government positions, hitting two artillery positions and an ammunition truck. The strikes, which killed two Syrian army soldiers, were again in retaliation for reported rocket strikes hitting the Israeli part of the Golan Heights. Following the strikes, the Syrian government said rebels launched a new attack on Baath City and a pro-opposition activist claimed the rebels managed to break through the government's first line of defence.

Israel conducted a third round of air-strikes on 26 June. According to Israeli sources, a shell from fighting in Syria landed on Israeli-occupied territory as Israeli Prime Minister Benjamin Netanyahu was touring the area, although there were no injuries or damage. Syrian military sources reported the Israeli strikes hit the Mafrazeh Al-Jisr checkpoint, killing two soldiers. Subsequently, according to Syrian military sources, rebels unsuccessfully attacked the "key" hilltop of Tal Ahmar, clashing with Syrian military and National Defense Forces and "allied paramilitaries". The Syrian Observatory on Human Rights reported at least four Syrian or allied soldiers killed in the three days of Israeli air-strikes.

28 June saw a fourth round of Israeli air-strikes and further ground clashes erupted in the early hours, accompanied by air-strikes by the Syrian Air Force as well. Later in the day, shelling between both sides took place and in the evening a major government counter-attack retook all remaining territory that the rebel forces had captured during the offensive. The Syrian Army and its allies then attempted to advance westwards into rebel-held areas, but reported that they abandoned their advance when the Israeli Air Force raided their positions at Al-Samdaniyah Al-Sharqiyah. According to Israel, the attack was in retaliation for a stray mortar shell hitting their territory – the 16th time stray fire from Syria struck Israeli territory in the week – and that they were firing back at the source of the fire. The next morning, the rebels hit Madinat al-Baath with a barrage of TOW anti-tank missiles in an attempt to restart their offensive.

On 1 July, the Syrian Army, supported by the National Defence Forces, continued their counter-attack, reporting they had recaptured the quarries area west of Baath City and thus reversing all rebel gains during the offensive. During the fighting, two stray artillery rounds hit the Israeli-occupied Golan Heights, prompting Israeli forces to target the Syrian government positions for the fifth time, targeting an artillery position they said was the source of the firing.

A four-day unilateral ceasefire was announced by the Syrian Army to take place between midday 2 July and midnight on 6 July. Although exchange of fire between Israel and Syria largely ceased, clashes renewed near Baath City on 3 July, with Israeli helicopters attacking Syrian Army positions according to Syrian military sources.

== Aftermath ==
On 8 July, the Syrian Army reported that, along with its allies, it had captured several points near Al-Samdaniyah Al-Gharbiyah.

As a precursor to Astana 5 peace talks, on 9 July 2017, at 0900 GMT, an American-Russian-Jordanian brokered ceasefire commenced. Besides minor violations from all sides involved, including machine gun fire on an Irish base on the Golan Heights, the ceasefire held though mid-July. The Southern Front boycotted the Astana 5 talks.

On 14 July, according to pro-government media, opposition groups in the "Death over Humiliation" operations room, including HTS and FSA groups participating in the Quneitra, offensive rejected the ceasefire, with clashes resuming across Southern Syria.

In early August, rebel sources reported that Russian forces were replacing government troops in Daraa and Quneitra, while pro-government sources reported that Russian military policemen had been deployed in the region and were now stationed in positions shared by the Syrian army and only the 4th Division was withdrawing. Both reported a new Russian base in the area, acting as a buffer between government/Hezbollah troops and Israeli occupied land and to enforce the ceasefire.

On 8 September, Tahrir al-Sham (HTS) fighters launched an offensive in the direction of the town of Hader, reportedly showering the town with missiles before launching a ground assault resulting in the capture of Tal al-Hira hilltop. However, later in the day the Syrian Army, alongside National Defense Forces, reported it had recaptured the high-point.

Despite the truce, government shelling was reported by the Syrian Observatory for Human Rights in late September 2017.

In mid-October 2017, the Syrian Army launched an operation in the nearby region known as Western Ghouta, capturing Tal Bard’ayyah hill and thus securing fire control over the town of Beit Jinn, held by HTS. However, the rebels recaptured all positions they had lost two days later. During this time, Israel conducted several strikes against Syrian Army artillery positions due to errant rocket fire hitting Israeli-held parts of the Golan Heights.

In mid-2018, the Syrian military was preparing to launch an offensive against rebel forces in the Quneitra Governorate, as part of a greater campaign in Southern Syria. As preparations were underway, the rebels burned farms near the frontline. The potential offensive was the subject of controversy with Israel due to the presence of Iranian backed groups in the region, with the Israeli government pressuring Russia to force Iranian backed groups out of the region.

== See also ==
- 2018 Southern Syria offensive
- Daraa offensive (June 2017)
- Daraa offensive (February–June 2017)
- Quneitra offensive (September 2016)
