= Syrian Desert campaign =

Syrian Desert campaign may refer to:

- Syrian Desert campaign (December 2017–December 2024)
- Syrian Desert campaign (May–July 2017)
- Syrian Desert campaign (December 2016–April 2017)
