= Eastern Qalamoun offensive (September–October 2016) =

2016 military offensive

- Part of the Rif Dimashq Governorate campaign of the Syrian Civil War
Date	3 September – 15 October 2016 (1 month, 1 week and 5 days)
Location	Eastern Qalamoun Mountains, Rif Dimashq Governorate, Syria
Result	Both sides capture or recapture territory; Government forces bombard ISIL positions in the region

Belligerents
Syrian Opposition; (Syria) Syrian Government	Islamic State of Iraq and the Levant

Commanders and leaders
Harith Siwar (WIA) (Eastern Qalamoun Jaysh al-Islam commander); Salih Nouman † (Eastern Qalamoun Jaysh al-Islam commander) (Syrian opposition) Abdul Rahman Abu Mansour (Al-Rahman Legion deputy commander) (Syrian opposition) Abu Barzan (Lions of the East Army deputy commander)	(Islamic State) Unknown

Units involved
(Syrian opposition) Free Syrian Army; Southern Front; (Syrian opposition) Forces of Martyr Ahmad al-Abdo; Lions of the East Army; (Syrian opposition) Sham Liberation Army; Al-Rahman Legion; Jaysh al-Islam; Ahrar al-Sham; Jabhat Fateh al-Sham; Syrian Armed Forces; Syrian Air Force	(Islamic State) Military of ISIL; Wilayat Dimashq

Strength
(Syrian opposition) 600–1,500 fighters (Ba'athist Syria) Helicopters and fighter jets	(Islamic State) Unknown

Casualties and losses
(Syrian opposition) 24 fighters killed (Note: (ISIL claim)) (Ba'athist Syria) 1 MiG-23 crashed	(Islamic State) 23–62 militants killed (Note: (Rebel claim))

The Eastern Qalamoun offensive was a large-scale military offensive against Syrian rebel positions in the eastern Qalamoun Mountains of the Rif Dimashq Governorate launched by the Islamic State of Iraq and the Levant along a frontline of more than 15 kilometers in the region.

== Offensive ==
On 3 September 2016, ISIL sent two car bombs towards rebel positions in the mountains, but both were destroyed before they could reach their targets. Following this, ISIL forces stormed the rebel-held territory from three different axes, overrunning several positions and reportedly killing more than 20 rebels.

Three days later, an ISIL convoy was deployed as they launched a second assault in the area. During the clashes, the rebels destroyed an ISIL T-72, a bulldozer, and a ZU-23-2, the latter with a BGM-71 TOW missile. The next day, Jaysh al-Islam recaptured a hill near Dumayr from ISIL.

On 9 September, ISIL launched a third attack against rebel forces in the mountains. Rebels led by Jaysh al-Islam and various Free Syrian Army factions repelled the assault and dozens of ISIL fighters were killed. Hundreds of rebel reinforcements reportedly arrived in the region the next day. On 13 September, ISIL recaptured the three hilltops of Jabal Zubaydi, Tall Daba'a and Jabal al-Afa'i. On 14–15 September, rebels launched a counter-attack to regain Jabal al-Afa'i. On 17–18 September, ISIL forces launched a successful assault against rebel positions at Badiya, killing four and capturing forty defenders, while losing two vehicles in return. Heavy fighting between rebels and ISIL in the area was reported on 19 September, as the ISIL offensive entered its 3rd week.

On 21 September, Ahrar al-Sham and the Forces of Martyr Ahmad al-Abdo recaptured the Rajem al-A'ali area, giving them the control of 40% of the al-Afa'i Mountains, while a Syrian Air Force MiG-23 targeting ISIL crashed in the region. Rebel forces made further progress later that day, retaking several positions at Jebal Batra. The pilot of the crashed government jet landed in rebel territory in the mountains and as a result of a truce in the area, the rebels handed him over to the Syrian Armed Forces and reportedly received small arms and ammunition from government forces in return. By 23 September, the rebels were in control of 70% of Jabal al-Afa'i.

On 26 September, unknown gunmen attempted to assassinate Harith Siwar, commander of Jaysh al-Islam in the Eastern Qalamoun Mountains. On 29 September, ISIL forces launched a new attack in the eastern Qalamoun Mountains, leading to heavy clashes with the rebel defenders. In the night of 1–2 October, ISIL fighters stormed eastern Jabal al-Afa'i amid heavy fighting with FSA forces. Two days later, Jaysh al-Islam repelled another major ISIL attack on Jabal al-Afa'i and al-Naqab. On 9 October, 12 ISIL fighters and an unknown number of rebels were killed in clashes after an attack by ISIL on al-Khandaq and al-Naqab mountain. Five rebels were killed in clashes on the following day. On 15 October, rebels launched an assault on Kahil Tes and Mahol areas.

== Aftermath ==
On 26 October, Syrian military bombarded areas under ISIL control in the region. On 2 November, clashes renewed between ISIL and rebels, concentrated in the area of Jabal al-Afa'i.

On 6 November, the rebels launched their own offensive, attacking ISIL positions. The rebels stated they had captured three checkpoints, with 7 ISIL fighters and 4 rebels being killed in the clashes. With the recent advances, rebels broke the siege imposed by ISIL on them in the region and had started advancing northwards to retake territory previously captured by the group.

On 29 December, FSA forces launched an offensive toward ISIL lines in the eastern Qalamoun and captured five villages.

== See also ==
- Al-Dumayr offensive (April 2016)
