= 7th Mechanized Division (Syria) =

- فرقة المشاة الآلية السابعة
- 7th Mechanized Division Flag
- Active: 1970–2024
- Country: Ba'athist Syria
- Allegiance: Syrian Arab Armed Forces
- Branch: Syrian Arab Army
- Type: Mechanized infantry
- Role: Conventional warfare
- Size: up to 14,000 soldiers (2019)
- Part of: 1st Corps
- Garrison/HQ: Aleppo; Quneitra (90th Brigade)
- Engagements: Yom Kippur War; Valley of Tears; Syrian Civil War; Rif Dimashq clashes (November 2011–March 2012); Battle of Damascus (2012); Quneitra Governorate clashes (2012–2014); 2014 Quneitra offensive; Daraa offensive (October 2014); Battle of Al-Shaykh Maskin (2014); Daraa offensive (January 2015); 2015 Southern Syria offensive; Khan al-Shih offensive (October–November 2016); Siege of Eastern Ghouta; Syrian Desert campaign (May–July 2017); Beit Jinn offensive; Rif Dimashq offensive (February–April 2018); Southern Damascus offensive (April–May 2018); Daraa offensive (June 2018); Northwestern Syria offensive (April–August 2019)

Commanders
- Current Commander: Maj. Gen. Akram Hawija
- Notable commanders: Col. Gen. Ali Habib Mahmud # Maj. Gen. Hossam Louka; Maj. Gen. Saleh al-Abdullah; Brig. Gen. Omar Abrash †

The 7th Mechanized Division (Arabic: فرقة المشاة الآلية السابعة) was a mechanized infantry division of the Syrian Arab Army. It was established in 1970. The division was part of the Syrian Army's 1st Corps.

== Command structure ==
7th Mechanized Division (2021)

- 88th Mechanized Brigade
- 90th Mechanized Brigade
- 121st Mechanized Brigade
- 78th Armored Brigade
- 70th Artillery Brigade

== Combat history ==
=== Yom Kippur War ===
The division, formed as 7th Infantry Division, was a key component of the Syrian attack force in the 1973 Yom Kippur War, involved in some of the heaviest fighting in the Golan Heights, especially in the aptly named 'Valley of Tears'. The division, with its attached armoured brigade, lost a great number of tanks when trying on many accounts to rush the Israeli defenses. Brig. Gen. Omar Abrash was serving as the division commander.

In 1973, the division's equipment, organisation, tactics, and training were virtually identical to those of the 5th Infantry Division during its action in Jordan. In the later stages of the war, the 81st Armored Brigade (from the 3rd Division) and the 1st Moroccan Mechanized Brigade were also attached to the ranks of the division and fought within it.

Although Syrian division had a nominal strength of around 10,000 men, 200 tanks, 72 artillery pieces and similar numbers of SAMs and anti-aircraft guns, the 7th Infantry Division had only 80% of its tanks and APCs during the war. Furthermore, although designated as an infantry division, the division was essentially mechanised. Because of the extensive losses suffered by the division during the battle of the Valley of Tears, one of the division's brigades had to be pulled out of action for 3 days before being reorganized as a battalion.

=== Syrian Civil War ===
During the civil war the 7th Division lost at least four unit commanders:

- Major General Abdelrahman Ibrahim, commander of the 88th Infantry Brigade, killed in Jabal Zawiya, Idlib, June 24, 2013;
- Brigadier General Sam Sultan, next commander of the 88th Infantry Brigade, killed in Kafir, Idlib, late July 2014;
- Brigadier General Muhail Ahmad, commander of the 68th Mechanized Brigade, killed in Beit Tema in Rif Dimashq on August 9, 2014;
- Brigadier General Rakan Diab, commander of the 137th Artillery Regiment, killed in Quneitra July 15, 2018.

In August 2012, Gen. Mohamed Moussa al-Khairat, reported as the division commander, defected to Jordan. In 2015, the 68th Brigade was transferred from the 7th Division to the 1st Division. Elements of the brigade also deployed with the 7th Division's 137th Artillery Regiment to Deir ez-Zor and then to Beit Jinn in the second half of 2017. The 241st Mechanized Battalion of the 68th Brigade was one of the first units deployed to Deir ez-Zor in 2011. The remnants of the battalion remained here until 2017.

The 88th Brigade, long stationed in northern Hama/Idlib, became part of the newly created 6th Division of the 4th Volunteer Assault Corps in late 2015, but suffered significant losses during the rebel offensive in the spring of 2016. The rest of the 7th Division has fought almost exclusively in southern Syria since at least late 2017, although elements of the 137th Artillery Regiment have been deployed to Deir ez-Zor Governorate in March 2017 and participated in the Syrian Desert campaign.

On 10 May 2018, the SAA High Command appointed Major General Hussam Louka in charge of the reorganization of the 7th Division. Louka turned the remaining four brigades of the 7th Division into "elite units" as well as moved the division’s headquarters from Damascus to Aleppo. In November 2018, he was promoted again to director of the Political Security Directorate of Syria. In May 2019, elements of the 121st and 78th Brigades of the 7th Division were ordered to north Hama and participated in the Northwestern Syria offensive (April–August 2019).
