= Jamaat Bayt al-Maqdis al-Islamiya =

- جامعات بيت المقدس الإسلامية
- Dates active: ~2013 – 2017
- Country: Syria
- Allegiance: Islamic State (2014)
- Active regions: Daraa Governorate; Al-Qahtaniyah
- Ideology: Jihadism
- Part of: Al-Bunyan al-Marsous Operations Room
- Wars: Syrian civil war; Daraa Governorate campaign; 2015 Southern Syria offensive; Quneitra offensive (September 2016); Daraa offensive (February–June 2017); Daraa offensive (June 2017)

Jamaat Bayt al-Maqdis al-Islamiya (Arabic: جامعات بيت المقدس الإسلامية, romanized: Jamaat Bayt al-Maqdis al-Islamiya, lit. 'Islamic universities of Jerusalem') was a jihadist organization in the Syrian Civil War.

== History ==
It was believed by some to be linked to the Islamic State based on its flag and logo, but the organization claimed that it was an "Islamic group...[working] to support the religion of God and make His word highest". Many of its fighters joined the Islamic State in Daraa. It was part of Al-Bunyan al-Marsous Operations Room.
