= Zubi (name) =

Zubi (and its variant Zoubi (Arabic: الزعبي)) is a name which is used as both a given name and a surname. Notable people with this name include:

== Given name ==
- Zubi (born 1993), Spanish footballer

== Name origin ==
Spanish, originated from Arabic

== Surname ==
- Abdullah Al-Zubi (born 1989), Jordanian football player
- Ahmed Zoubi, Libyan volleyball player
- Anwar al-Zoubi (born 1975), Syrian politician
- Assad al Zubi (born 1956), Free Syrian Army general
- Ghaleb Zu'bi (born 1943), Jordanian lawyer and politician
- Mahmoud Al-Zoubi (1935–2000), Syrian politician
- Musa Al-Zubi (born 1993), Jordanian professional footballer
- Omran al-Zoubi (1959–2018), Syrian politician and government minister
- Seif el-Din el-Zoubi (1913–1986), Israeli-Arab politician

== See also ==
- Al-Zoubi, a Levantine family
