= Quneitra Governorate clashes =

Quneitra Governorate clashes may refer to:

- Quneitra Governorate clashes (2012–2014)
- Quneitra Governorate clashes (2024)

== See also ==
- Quneitra offensive (disambiguation)
