= Abu Kamal offensive =

Abu Kamal offensive may refer to:

- 2016 Abu Kamal offensive
- 2017 Abu Kamal offensive
