= Majid al-Sayid Ahmed =

Free Syrian Army lieutenant colonel

- Born: Syria
- Military career
- Allegiance: Syria (previously) Syrian National Council (present)
- Branch: (Syria) Free Syrian Army
- Rank: Lieutenant colonel
- Unit: Southern Front
- Conflicts: Syrian civil war

Majid al-Sayid Ahmed is a Free Syrian Army lieutenant colonel, who defected from the Syrian Army to the FSA. He holds the position of head of the Operations Department for the Southern Front and is also head of the Ghouta Commandos Brigade. He was elected for his current position in December 2012 during a conference held in Turkey.
