= Quneitra offensive =

Quneitra offensive may refer to several actions of the Syrian civil war:

- 2014 Quneitra offensive, The Real Promise or Chargers of Dawn
- Quneitra offensive (June 2015)
- Quneitra offensive (October 2015)
- Quneitra offensive (September 2016), at Hader
- Quneitra offensive (June 2017) or Road to Damascus, at Madinat al-Baath

== See also ==
- Quneitra Governorate clashes (2012–2014)
- Quneitra Governorate clashes (2024)
