= Tawhid Kataʼib Horan =

Syrian rebel group

- Leader: Maj. Mohammad al-Turkmani †
- Active regions: Daraa Governorate; Quneitra Governorate
- Part of: Free Syrian Army; Southern Front
- Wars: the Syrian civil war

The Tawhid Kataʼib Horan (توحید کتائب حوران) is a Syrian rebel group that operates in the Daraa and Quneitra governorates of the Horan region. The group has been supplied with BGM-71 TOW anti-tank missiles. Its founder, major Mohammad al-Turkmani, was killed in clashes with loyalists.

== See also ==
- List of armed groups in the Syrian Civil War
