= Battle of Nasib Border Crossing =

Military operation

- Part of the Syrian Civil War
- Map showing the rebel offensive to seize the Nasib Border Crossing
Date	1 April 2015
Location	Nasib Border Crossing, Jordanian–Syrian border, Daraa Governorate, Syria
Result	Rebel victory
Territorial changes	Rebels capture the Nasib border crossing and the border area between Nasib and Amman

Belligerents
Free Syrian Army al-Nusra Front	(Syria) Syrian Arab Republic: Syrian Armed Forces; National Defense Force

Commanders and leaders
Col. Mohammed Khaled al-Duhni (Falcons of the South leader); Gen. Bashar al-Zoubi (Yarmouk Army leader); Abu Hadi al-Aboud (Faloujat Houran Brigade leader); Abu Salah al-Ansari (Nusra Front Daraa commander)	Unknown

Units involved
Southern Front: Falcons of the South; Yarmouk Army	Nasib border crossing garrison

The Battle of Nasib Border Crossing took place on 1 April 2015 during the Syrian Civil War that resulted in anti-government rebels capturing the Nasib Border Crossing, the last Syria government-held border crossing with Jordan.

== The battle ==
On 1 April 2015, rebel forces launched an offensive against government positions in and around the semi-besieged Nasib Border Crossing, forcing the Army to retreat from its last official border crossing with Jordan. Rebels also captured the border guard posts "62", "63" and "67". At least one BMP-1 was captured by the rebels.

The military acknowledged losing the border crossing and the three posts, but stated that it was still in control of the "Amman brigade" 12.5 miles (20 km) east of Nasib. However, video footage showed that the base was also captured.

The Syrian government stated that any use of the rebel-held crossing "will be considered illegitimate". The border crossing was closed by Jordan authorities.

== Aftermath ==
The next day, the Syrian Arab Air Force raided areas around the border crossing, killing eight people, including five rebels. The border crossing was looted by hundreds of rebels and civilians. The FSA accused al-Nusra Front of taking part in the looting and told them to leave. Furthermore, the Southern Front of the Free Syrian Army claimed al-Nusra participated only in the last stages of the fighting for the border crossing, not in the planning or initial attack. It also stated to have opened an investigation into the looting.

As of 3 April, the al-Nusra Front was in control of the crossing and deciding who can go through it. The al-Nusra Front held around ten Lebanese truck drivers, after their vehicles were stranded in 'no man's land'. According to the Lebanese Refrigerated Truck Union, between 30 and 35 Lebanese truck drivers were still stuck in the area. The SOHR stated that there were around 300 vehicles held up at the border crossing, while Seer al-Dinnieh Mayor Ahmad Alam confirmed that "many tons" of items were stolen during the looting.

On 4 April, the al-Nusra Front pulled back from the border crossing, leaving it to a civil administration. According to the SOHR, al-Nusra Front abducted at least 35 truck drivers from the border crossing. It was agreed in the 'courthouse of Horan' that all abducted truck drivers will be released within 24 hours that the border crossing must be managed by a civil administration. As of 6 April, two truck drivers were still being held captive. On 11 April, al-Nusra Front pulled back from the duty-free zone between the Syrian and Jordanian crossings at the request of the Southern Front. A spokesperson for the Southern Front said they would not cooperate militarily with al-Nusra Front.

== Analysis ==
The Nasib border crossing was the last major government-held border crossing with Jordan, and vital for transporting goods from Lebanon and Syria to Jordan and Gulf countries. The capture would possibly affect Lebanon's, Syria's and Jordan's economies greatly, according to the Lebanon's Economy Minister. It was a heavy blow to the government's efforts to rebuild Syria's export trade crippled by the civil war since the post was a conduit for $2 billion of bilateral trade annually. Muhanad al-Asfar, a senior member of the Syrian Exporters' Union, described the loss of the border post as a "catastrophe" for the Syrian economy.

An analysis by the Heinrich Böll Foundation suggested that Jordan gave approval to the Southern Front to take over the crossing, Jordan thereby putting its political interests over its economic interests, as the seizure would have a negative economic impact on Jordan, as well as on the Syrian government, and damaged Jordan's remaining diplomatic relations with the Syrian government.
