= Syrian Desert campaign (December 2016 – April 2017) =

Military campaign

Syrian Desert campaign (December 2016–April 2017)
- Part of the Deir ez-Zor Governorate campaign, the Opposition–Islamic State conflict during the Syrian civil war, and the International military intervention against ISIL
- Map of the advances in Southern Syria from 6 February to 30 April; Rebel advancements during the campaign are shown in green.
Date	First offensive: 29 December 2016 – 8 January 2017 (1 week and 3 days) Second offensive: 15 March – 2 April 2017 (2 weeks and 4 days) Third offensive: 20 – 30 April 2017 (1 week and 3 days)
Location	Syrian Desert, Syria: As Suwayda Governorate; Rif Dimashq Governorate; Eastern Homs Governorate; Eastern Deir ez-Zor Governorate
Result	Rebel victory: Syrian opposition captures more than 1,800 square kilometres (~695 square miles) of territory from ISIL; Syrian government captures more than 300 square kilometres (~116 square miles) of territory from ISIL in north-eastern Suwayda Governorate; ISIL expelled from the Suwayda Governorate and the eastern slopes of the Qalamoun mountains

Belligerents
Syrian Opposition; Supported by: CJTF–OIR; Jordan; United States	Islamic State

Commanders and leaders
(Syrian opposition) Abu Hamza al-Tayeb (Army of Free Tribes field commander) (Syrian opposition) Capt. Ahmad al-Tamer (Forces of Ahmad al-Abdo commander) (Syrian opposition) Talas Salama (Lions of the East Army general commander) (Syrian opposition) Lt. Col. Muhannad Talaa (Forces of Martyr Ahmad al-Abdo commander)	Unknown

Units involved
(Syrian opposition) Free Syrian Army; Southern Front; Forces of Martyr Ahmad al-Abdo; Lions of the East Army; Army of Free Tribes; Revolutionary Commando Army; Al-Qaratayn Martyrs Brigade; Eastern Qalamoun only: Ahrar al-Sham; Jaysh al-Islam; Al-Rahman Legion; Hay'at Tahrir al-Sham (pro-government claim)	(Islamic State) Military of ISIL; Wilayat Damascus; Wilayat Suwayda (until April 2017)

Casualties and losses
117 killed	21+ killed

The Syrian Desert campaign (December 2016–April 2017) was a military campaign launched by Syrian rebel forces affiliated with the Free Syrian Army's Southern Front and their allies in the southern Syrian Desert and the eastern Qalamoun Mountains. The aim of the offensive was to expel the Islamic State of Iraq and the Levant from the desert in southern Syria and to open a supply route between two rebel-held areas.

== The campaign ==
=== First FSA offensive (December 2016 – January 2017) ===
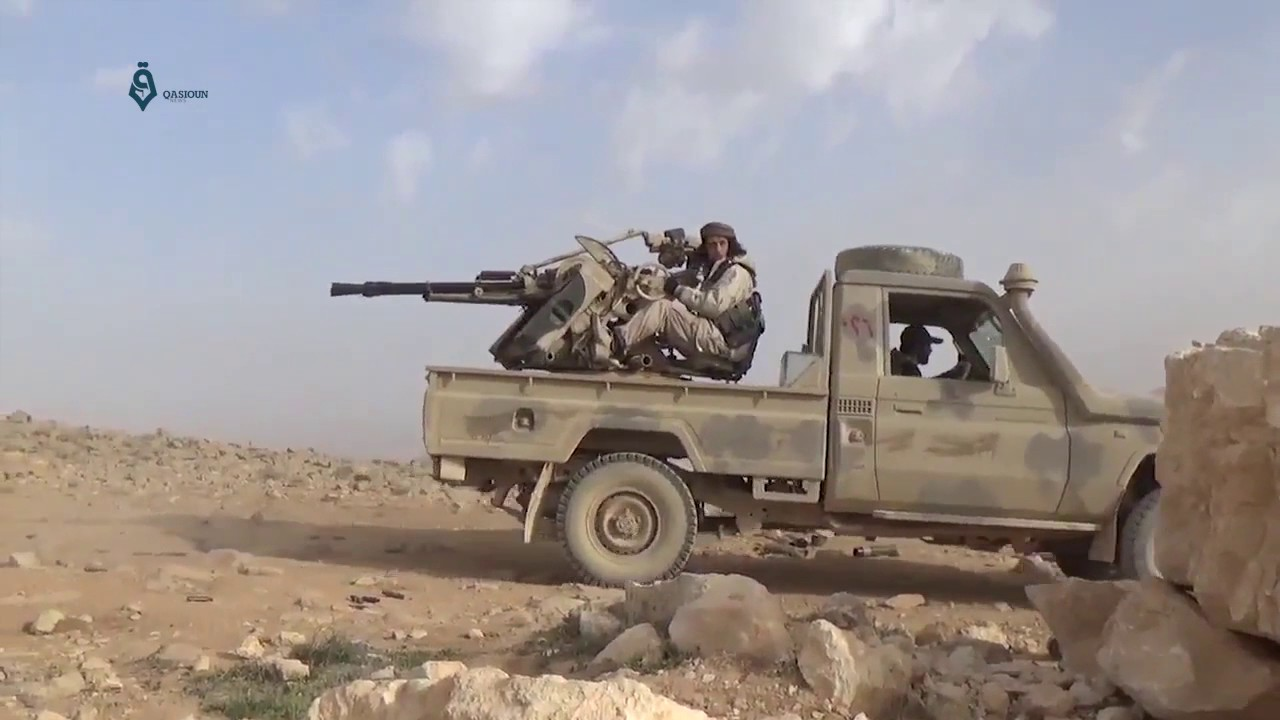
A Free Syrian Army technical in the eastern Qalamoun Mountains during clashes with ISIL

On 29 December 2016, Southern Front groups led by the Forces of Martyr Ahmad al-Abdo launched an offensive against ISIL positions in the eastern Qalamoun Mountains. The offensive was code named as the "Battle to Restore Dignity" by the rebels. The rebel forces captured the Abu Risha dam as well as five villages. Five days later, the rebels attacked the last bastions of ISIL in the Badia al-Sham area of the desert.

On 3 January 2017, the Army of Free Tribes announced the capture of the Zelaf dam east of as-Suwayda, the village next to it, and an ancient grotto used as a black site by ISIL. On 8 January, the Forces of Ahmad al-Abdo captured more than 18 positions in the eastern Qalamoun Mountains from ISIL.

=== Interlude ===
On 8 February, rebel forces advanced in the eastern Qalamoun, which resulted in heavy clashes with ISIL. On 13 February, rebel forces led by the Lions of the East Army advanced in the as-Suwayda Governorate near the Jordan–Syria border and captured al-Kraa and al-Dayathah from ISIL.

=== Second FSA offensive (15 March – 2 April 2017) ===
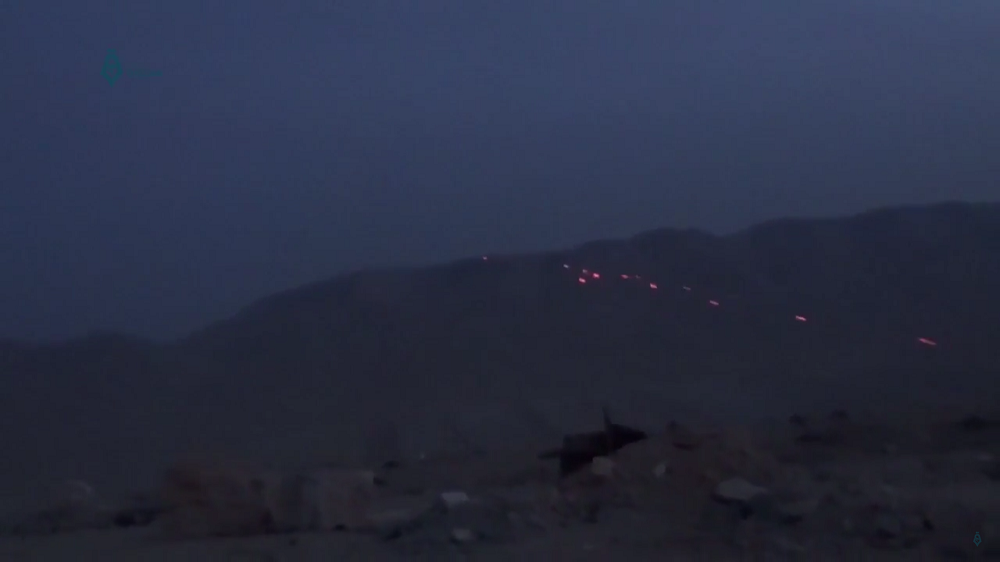
Free Syrian Army units shoot at ISIL positions in the Qalamoun Mountains during the night.

The Free Syrian Army's Martyr Ahmad al-Abdo Forces launched a night assault between 15 and 16 March against ISIL in the Eastern Qalamoun Mountains. The offensive was launched on two fronts, the eastern Qalamoun Mountains and the Syrian Desert along the Jordan–Syria border. The rebels code-named the former as the "Battle for the Expulsion of Agressors" while the latter was termed the "Saddle of horses". The rebels seized several points in the al-Afai Mountain.

Rebel factions attacked ISIL on 18 and 19 March near al-Badia and captured several areas, including a former Scientific Research Battalion base. They captured several areas including the strategic Mount Naqab on 20 March. By 21 March, the rebels had captured more than 25 square kilometres of territory in the eastern Qalamoun and more than 1,800 square kilometres overall since the start of the campaign. ISIL forces were routed from the majority of eastern Qalamoun. Ahrar al-Sham announced that its fighters had captured al-Afai mountain range.

Rebels continued clashing at a rest stop near Baghdad-Damascus highway, amid advancement for the rebels in the region. It was reported on 24 March that ISIL was withdrawing from southern Syria to focus on the Raqqa offensive and had withdrawn from several areas of eastern Qalamoun without putting up any resistance. Two days later, FSA forces seized three more villages from ISIL near the Iraqi border.

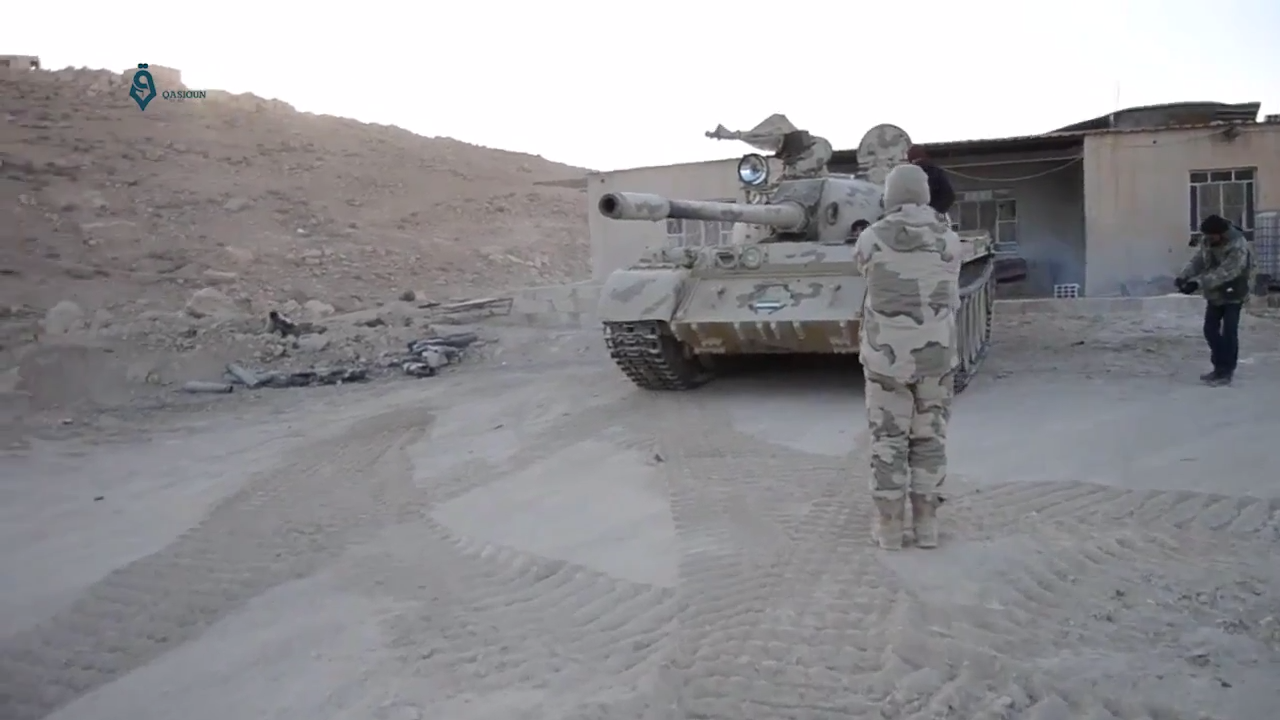
An FSA T-55 in the eastern Qalamoun Mountains during the second phase of the campaign

The Syrian Arab Army, backed up by the National Defence Forces and the Air Force Intelligence Directorate, attacked ISIL in the countryside of eastern Suwayda on 26 March as the militants were withdrawing. SAA captured several villages and sites during the advance. The FSA made a large advance at the same time, reaching the front lines with SAA the next day. The FSA announced that they had captured al-Badia area and more than a dozen sites near Bir al-Qasab, which were the main ISIL strongholds in southeastern Syria. Many villages including Bir Qasab were captured from ISIL in the rebel advance. The rebels captured the Dakwa mountain area on 28 March, After midnight, areas in Bir Qasab were targeted by an air raid. The rebel advances fully expelled ISIL forces from the southwestern part of the Syrian Desert.

On 29 March, the rebels announced that ISIL had been expelled from the entire countryside of Damascus. Orient News stated that ISIL had withdrawn from areas of Jabal al-Makhul, Tal Dakwa and its surroundings, al-Qeseb Be'r, al-Seraikhi and Tal al-Dukhan after the Syrian opposition groups attacked them.

ISIL attacked the Al-Tanf military base near the Al Waleed border crossing on 8 April, first striking the base with a car bomb and then attacking both the base and a convoy of the Lions of the East Army with 20-30 infantry. The attack was repelled first by gunfire from the rebels and U.S. special operations forces, then by multiple airstrikes from the anti-ISIL coalition which killed most of the ISIL force and destroyed their vehicles. Rebels stated that four of their fighters and eight ISIL fighters were killed.

=== Third FSA offensive (20–30 April 2017) ===
Map of rebel advances in the Syrian Desert

On 20 April, FSA rebels led by the Lions of the East Army captured Alalianih, along with an abandoned military base, in the Syrian Desert. Four days later, the FSA launched an offensive around the eastern slopes of Qalamoun mountains, targeting the area around the villages of Al-Mahsaa and Abou Al-Shamat in order to lift ISIL's siege on eastern Qalamoun. The official media wings of FSA stated they captured many points during the day.

On 29 April, ISIL launched a counter-attack against the rebels of Osoud Al-Sharqiya in Eastern Qalamoun. The group recaptured several sites in the region. The next day, the FSA launched a counterattack in the region and its official media wing later stated that it had recaptured several sites.

== Aftermath ==
Map of rebel advances in Deir ez Zor

During the campaign, some rebel groups started to advance into the Homs and Deir ez-Zor governorates. A rebel spokesman stated that their goal was the expulsion of ISIL from the region and reaching the city of Deir ez-Zor. They would be supported by the anti-ISIL Coalition, rather than having the Syrian Democratic Forces capture it. The FSA also wanted to capture the border town of al-Bukamal, the last border crossing under ISIL control between Iraq and Syria which they had also tried to capture in their failed 2016 offensive.

On 30 April, the Revolutionary Commando Army attacked and advanced into eastern Syria, reaching the Deir ez-Zor Governorate and capturing the village of Humaymah to the south of the T2 pumping station. Two days later, the rebels attacked and captured several sites in the region, including: Tarwazeh Al-Wa`er, Sereit Al-Wa`er, Jabal Ghrab, Sawab desert, al-Kamm Sawab, the T2 Pumping Station, Me`izeileh and Tarwazeh al-Attshaneh. On 6 May, the FSA captured several sites in the Badiya region of Homs Governorate to the south of Palmyra including Dahlous and Al-Halbah areas.

On 7 May, the Syrian Arab Army launched an attack on the FSA, in the Badiya region of the southeastern countryside of Damascus, advancing some 45 kilometers along the Baghdad-Damascus highway towards the Iraqi border. On 18 May, a mechanized convoy of SAA soldiers and Iraqi Shi'ite militiamen was struck by several U.S. airstrikes northwest of the Zarqa Junction, destroying 5 tanks and a 1 Shilka, as well as killing 8-12 Iraqi militiamen. The advance along the Damascus-Baghdad Highway was halted.
