= Kafir, Idlib =

Kafir, Idlib الكفير
- Village
- Location in Syria
- Coordinates: 35°46′57″N 36°19′19″E
- Country: Syria
- Governorate: Idlib
- District: Jisr al-Shughur District
- Subdistrict: Jisr al-Shughur Nahiyah

Population (2004)
  - Total: 1,567
- Time zone: UTC+2 (EET)
  - Summer (DST): UTC+3 (EEST)
- City Qrya Pcode: C4205

Kafir, Idlib (Arabic: الكفير) is a Syrian village located in Jisr al-Shughur Nahiyah in Jisr al-Shughur District, Idlib. According to the Syria Central Bureau of Statistics (CBS), Kafir, Idlib had a population of 1,567 in the 2004 census.

== Syrian Civil War ==
On 8 February 2015, the Syrian army and allied militia forces stormed the village, displacing the residents and subsequently looting the town.
