= 2016 Abu Kamal offensive =

2016 military operation of the Syrian civil war

Abu Kamal offensive (2016)
- Part of Opposition–Islamic State conflict of the Syrian civil war and the international military intervention against ISIL
- Map of the offensive
Date	28–29 June 2016 (1 day)
Location	Abu Kamal District, Deir-Ez-Zor Governorate, Syria 34.4463°N 40.9210°E
Result	ISIL victory: The FSA withdraws from all positions it had captured back to its base at al-Tanf

Belligerents
(Syrian opposition) Free Syrian Army; Pro-NSA Arab clans Supported by: CJTF–OIR: United States; CIA; Jordan	Islamic State: Wilayat al-Furat

Commanders and leaders
(Syrian opposition) Khazal al-Sarhan (New Syrian Army commander) (Syrian opposition) Mozahem al-Saloum (NSA spokesman)	Abu Ruqayya al-Ansari

Units involved
(Syrian opposition) Authenticity and Development Front; (Syrian opposition) Syrian Free Army; (Syrian opposition) Southern Front; (Syrian opposition) Lions of the East Army; (Syrian opposition) Forces of Martyr Ahmad al-Abdo	Unknown

Strength
(Syrian opposition) 125–200 NSA fighters	Unknown

Casualties and losses
40 killed, 15 captured (ISIL claim); 25+ killed or captured (SOHR claim); 5–40+ killed (NSA claim)	20 killed (NSA claim)

The 2016 Abu Kamal offensive, also known as Operation Day of Wrath, was launched on the town of Abu Kamal on the Syrian–Iraqi border led by the US-backed New Syrian Army (NSA).

== The offensive ==
On 28 June 2016, the New Syrian Army rebels launched the offensive from at-Tanf and occupied the village of al-Sukkariya north of Abu Kamal, the nearby Hamdan Military Airfield, and the Ayshat al-Khayri Hospital in northern Abu Kamal, all of which were unguarded by ISIL. They also established several positions in the desert between the Tanf border crossing and Abu Kamal. Some NSA troops were airlifted to the area by three Coalition helicopters while a sizable convoy of US provided vehicles made its way from the at-Tanf garrison toward Abu Kamal. The NSA advance was aided by FSA covert supporters inside the city. At the same time as the operation started, it was reported that Iraqi Federal Police forces were preparing to simultaneously attack the town of al-Qa'im, on the Iraqi side of the border. However, Iraqi Sunni tribesmen were the ones in fact involved in the operation, and acted ”precipitously and insufficiently in their role”, alerting ISIL of the offensive. ISIL then proceeded to cut power and communications in Abu Kamal, followed by digging trenches around the city.

On the next day, US air support was withdrawn to take part in the Third Battle of Fallujah. ISIL recaptured the airbase, pushed the rebels back from the outskirts of Abu Kamal, and attacked the supply lines of the NSA through the empty desert. ISIL fighters encircled the rebels in a surprise ambush. They inflicted heavy casualties on the rebels, and NSA weapons and vehicles were seized by the jihadists. The rebels initially retreated to the outlying desert areas, before fully pulling back to their base at the at-Tanf border crossing, 200 miles away. The lack of US air support was blamed as the key factor contributing to the NSA's defeat, but without coalition air controllers on the ground, it was unlikely the air support would have made any significant contribution.

The offensive was described by some as a ”crippling defeat” and a ”Bay-of-Pigs-style fiasco” for the rebels, while the Syrian Observatory for Human Rights director stated after the defeat that the whole operation ”was more a media show than anything else”. The U.S. Secretary of Defense Ash Carter stated, in regards to the pulling back of the air support for the rebels, ”We missed an opportunity”.

== Losses ==
In an ISIL propaganda video, the NSA suffered 2 known deaths on the battlefield along with 3 fighters from the Ahmad al-Abdo Martyr group who were killed in an ISIL ambush while retreating from Abu Kamal. ISIL, however, claimed 40 NSA deaths and 15 captured along with the seizure of a large amount of weaponry consisting of mostly heavy machine guns, mortars, and assault rifles. In addition, ISIL suffered 20 deaths according to the NSA in a combination of a total of 13 Coalition air-strikes and their ground offensive operation. In one instance, a pro-NSA sleeper cell group in Abu Kamal detonated a car bomb that killed 3 ISIL fighters.

== See also ==
- Syrian Desert campaign (December 2016 – April 2017)
- 2017 Abu Kamal offensive
- As-Suwayda offensive (August–November 2018)
- Deir ez-Zor Governorate campaign
