= Assad al Zubi =

Syrian army general

Asaad al Zoubi
- Born: 1956 (age 69–70); Maliha al-Atash, Daraa, Second Syrian Republic
- Military career
- Allegiance: Ba'athist Syria (1974–2011) Syrian National Council (2011–present)
- Branch: Syrian Air Force
- Service years: 1974–2011; 2011–present
- Rank: General
- Unit: Southern Front
- Conflicts: Syrian civil war

Asaad al Zoubi (Arabic: أسعد الزعبي; born 1956) is a Syrian rebel leader and former military officer who serves as the head of the Southern Front, a coalition of rebel groups operating in southern Syria up until the 2024 fall of the Assad regime. Before his defection in 2011, he served in the Syrian Air Force and was the head of the air force branch of the Supreme Syrian Military Academy.

He joined Syria's air force academy in 1974, graduating in 1977 with the rank of lieutenant and then rose through the ranks to become a brigadier general.

In January 2016, al-Zoubi was named Head of the opposition delegation team to the 3rd Geneva conference on the future of Syria.

He also worked as a military consultant in Yemen for more than two years.
