= Sham Liberation Army =

Armed rebel group active in the Syrian Civil War

- جيش تحرير الشام; Jaysh Tahrir al-Sham
- Logo of Saraya Ahl al-Sham, which the Sham Liberation Army is a member group
- Leaders: Abu Muwaffaq al-Shami (commander-in-chief); Abu Mohsen al-Qalamouni (military commander); Col. Abdullah al-Rifai † (Western Qalamoun Union); Capt. Firas Ibn Bitar (Levant Liberation Army); Zuhair Mohammad (LLA second-in-command)
- Dates active: 30 September 2015 – 2019?
- Headquarters: Afrin, Aleppo Governorate, Syria (Since 2018)
- Active regions: Eastern Qalamoun Mountains (until 25 April 2018); Western Qalamoun Mountains, Lebanon–Syria border (until August 2017); Damascus Governorate (Levant Liberation Division, 2012–2014)
- Size: 400 (August 2017 - Saraya Ahl al-Sham total)
- Part of: Free Syrian Army
- Wars: the Syrian Civil War

The Sham Liberation Army (Arabic: جيش تحرير الشام, romanized: Jaysh Tahrir al-Sham), originally called the Sham Liberation Brigade (Arabic: لواء تحرير الشام, romanized: Liwa Tahrir al-Sham), was a paramilitary organisation, active in early phases of the Syrian Civil War. It was founded and led by Firas Bitar, a former Syrian Army captain who defected from the Syrian Army in 2012. Until 2016, its sole opponent was the Syrian Armed Forces and its allied militias; it rejected any fighting with the Islamic State of Iraq and the Levant until ISIL attacked its fighters in February 2016.

In September 2015, the Sham Liberation Army and other militant organisations in the Qalamoun Mountains formed Saraya Ahl al-Sham (Arabic: سرايا أهل الشام; Companies of the People of the Levant).

== History ==
In November 2014, Colonel Abdullah al-Rifai of the 11th Special Forces Division of Sham Liberation Army was arrested by the Lebanese Armed Forces near Arsal. He was detained by the General Directorate of General Security and released on 2 January 2015. On 14 August, he was assassinated in Arsal.

On 30 September 2015, Sham Liberation Army, along with 12 other FSA and Islamist rebel factions, formed Saraya Ahl al-Sham in the western Qalamoun Mountains. The group maintained "good" relations with al-Qaeda's al-Nusra Front and other groups in the former Army of Conquest's Qalamoun branch.

In February 2016, the SLA along with Saraya Ahl al-Sham rejected the inter-rebel conflict during the Syrian Civil War against the Islamic State of Iraq and the Levant, remaining neutral in the conflict and stating that its only opponent is the Syrian government. However, during the eastern Qalamoun offensive (September—October 2016), the group joined with the other rebels in fighting ISIL.

In February 2017, negotiations between Saraya Ahl al-Sham and Hezbollah began in order to install a ceasefire and for residents to return to the contested towns and villages between Hezbollah and the rebels.

On 27 July 2017, a ceasefire agreement was reached by Hezbollah with Tahrir al-Sham and Saraya Ahl al-Sham in the Lebanese portion of the Qalamoun Mountains. The agreement called for Tahrir al-Sham forces to withdraw from Lebanon to Idlib, Saraya Ahl al-Sham forces to withdraw to the eastern Qalamoun Mountains, where opposition forces maintain a pocket of control, and exchanges of prisoners from both sides.

On 14 August 2017, the last 400 fighters of Saraya Ahl al-Sham coalition and their families departed the Lebanon–Syria border and headed to the eastern Qalamoun Mountains.

In April 2018, the SLA, along with the rest of Saraya Ahl al-Sham evacuated to Afrin.

On 7 April 2018, the group published a statement condemning the Syrian Government, the Russian intervention and Hezbollah involvement in the war and requested that the United Nations send in military forces to intervene.

== Saraya Ahl Al-Sham Member groups ==
- Western Qalamoun Union
- Levant Liberation Division
  - Levant Liberation Brigade (Sham Liberation Army)
  - Sadik Unit
  - Martyr Mohammed Qassem Brigade
- al-Ghouta Martyrs Battalion
- Omar Haider Brigade
- 11th Special Forces Division (formerly part of the Southern Front)
- Itasimou Bihabl al-Lah Rally
- al-Ghurabaa Brigade
- The Men from Qalamoun Brigade
- Western Qalamoun Rally
- Martyrs of Qastal Brigade
- Dira al-Qalamoun Battalion
- Martyrs of Nabek Battalion
- Ibn Taymiyyah Battalion

== See also ==
- Armed factions in the Syrian civil war
