= Omari Brigades =

- Alwiyat al-Omari
- Logo of the Omari Brigades
- Leaders: Capt Qais Al Qatahneh. †; Fares Adib al-Baydar (formerly)
- Headquarters: Lajat region, Syria
- Active regions: Daraa Governorate
- Part of: Free Syrian Army: Southern Front; Alliance of Southern Forces; Syrian Revolutionaries Front southern branch (former)
- Wars: the Syrian Civil War

The Omari Brigades was a Syrian rebel group formed in the Lajat region in Daraa Governorate as the first FSA group formed in the province. It received TOW missiles and was supplied and funded by Saudi Arabia. It was part of the Alliance of Southern Forces. The group was named after the Omari Mosque in Daraa city.

== History ==
The group's leader, Captain Al Qatahneh, was killed in a gun battle with an opposition activist named Qaisar Habib on 28 August 2014. The activist, severely wounded and admitted to a hospital, was murdered on 19 October by Omari Brigades fighters. In 2016, the group participated in the fight between the Syrian opposition and two Islamic State of Iraq and the Levant-affiliated groups, the Yarmouk Martyrs Brigade and the Islamic Muthanna Movement. On 1 April, ISIL attempted to assassinate Fares Adib al-Baydar, the former brigade leader.

== See also ==
- List of armed groups in the Syrian Civil War
