= Baarbu =

Baarbu بعربو
- Village
- Location in Syria
- Coordinates: 35.49167°N 36.47139°E
- Country: Syria
- Governorate: Idlib
- District: Maarrat al-Nu'man District
- Subdistrict: Khan Shaykhun Nahiyah

Population (2004)
  - Total: 954
- Time zone: UTC+2 (EET)
  - Summer (DST): UTC+3 (EEST)
- City Qrya Pcode: C3992

Baarbu (Arabic: بعربو) is a Syrian village located in Khan Shaykhun Nahiyah in Maarrat al-Nu'man District, Idlib. According to the Syria Central Bureau of Statistics (CBS), Baarbu had a population of 954 in the 2004 census.
