= Southern Front (Syrian rebel group) =

Rebel alliance in the Syrian Civil War active from 2014 to 2018

- الجبهة الجنوبية
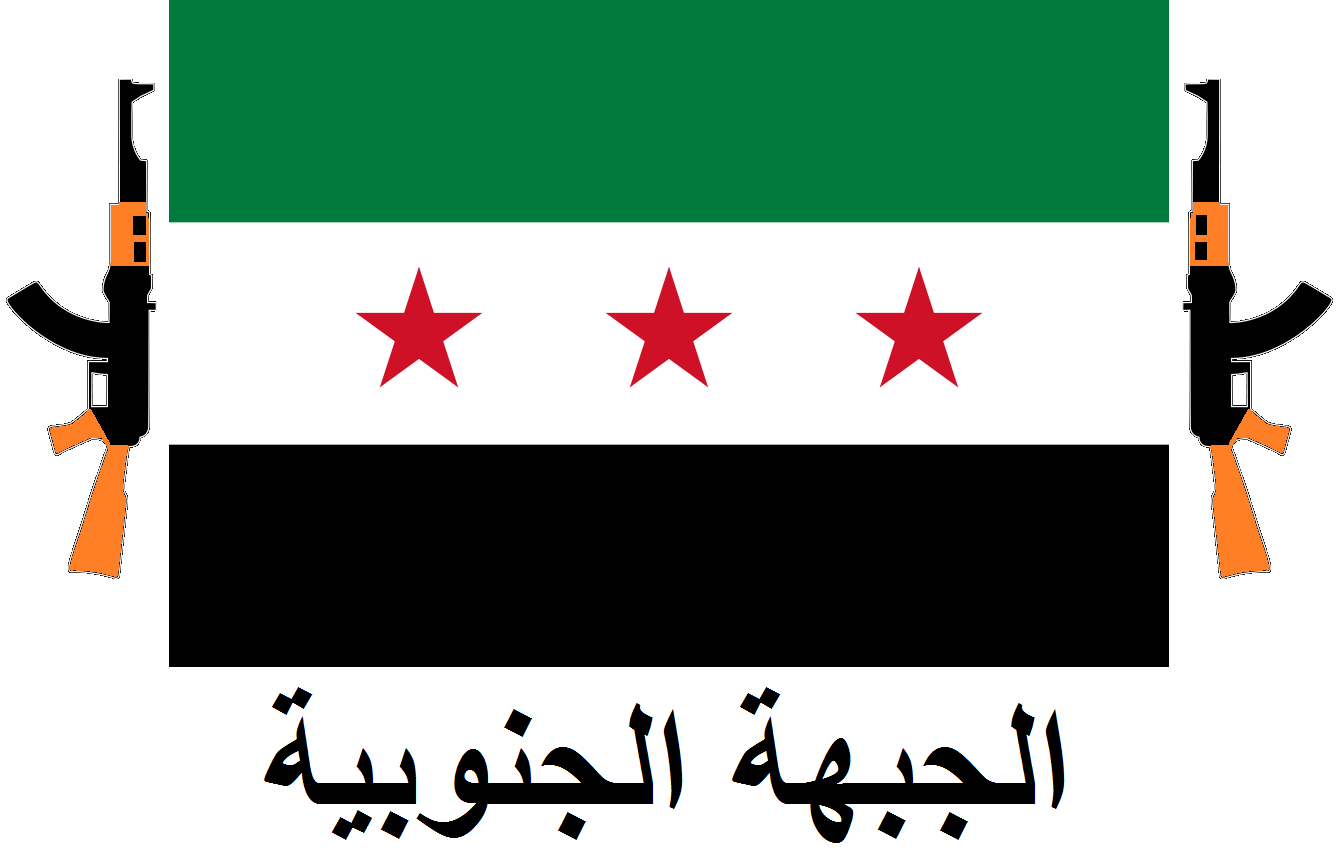
- Logo of the Southern Front: the Syrian independence flag flanked by an AK-47 on each side
- Leader: See Leadership
- Dates active: 13 February 2014 – 23 July 2018
- Headquarters: Amman
- Active regions: Daraa Governorate; Quneitra Governorate; As Suwayda Governorate; Damascus
- Ideology: Nationalism; Anti-authoritarianism; Democracy; Factions: Islamism; Secularism
- Size: 30,000 (June 2014); 25,000 (Nov. 2015) 30,000 (July 2018)
- Part of: (Syrian opposition) Free Syrian Army (disputed) See Nature of the Front
- Wars: the Syrian Civil War

The Southern Front (Arabic: الجبهة الجنوبية) was a Syrian rebel alliance consisting of 54 or 58 Syrian opposition factions affiliated with the Free Syrian Army (FSA), established on 13 February 2014 in southern Syria. By June 2015, the Southern Front controlled about 70 percent of Daraa Governorate, according to the International Institute for Strategic Studies; by 2018, the front was defunct, with most of its fighters either reintegrating into the Syrian Army or fleeing to other FSA-held lands in the north.

The coalition was described by Western officials as "the best organized of the mainstream opposition". The constituent groups ranged from secularist groups to moderate religious groups, and the Southern Front has been described as a "non-hardline Islamist rebel group" that rejects extremism.

== Nature of the front ==
The Southern Front is an alliance of over 50 rebel groups, ranging from secularist to moderately religious. Bashar al-Zoubi, head of the Yarmouk Army, said to the BBC in 2014 that the groups or factions of the Southern Front are militarily coordinated by a moving command center with a unified leadership but with no overall commander and no centralised command—which is contradictory.

The Carter Center, a private organization in the U.S. promoting human rights globally, in February 2015 also described the Southern Front as a loose coalition of self-described moderate armed groups without leadership or organizational structure, that agreed on the name ‘Southern Front’ to receive support from the inter-governmental Friends of Syria through the southern MOC ("Military Operations Center") in Amman.

The relationship between the Southern Front and the Syrian armed rebel group Free Syrian Army (FSA) has been described differently by different news sources. Remarks of news sources about such relation are in some cases more or less compatible, in other cases incompatible. Some statements in chronological order:

1. The Syrian Observer on 14 February 2014 stated that 49 rebel groups in southern Syria had announced in a statement the establishment of ‘The Southern Front’ and suggested vaguely that Southern Front was affiliated with FSA.
2. The Carnegie Endowment for International Peace mentioned on 21 March 2014 that the ‘Omari Brigades’, one of the FSA units from 2011, became a member faction of 'Syrian Revolutionaries Front' (created in December 2013) which was in mid-February 2014 one of the 49 factions that banded together as the Southern Front signing a statement.
3. The Huffington Post stated on 15 May 2014 that a loose coalition of about 50 rebel units including the largest FSA units in southern Syria in February 2014 had announced the establishment of the Southern Front.
4. The National Interest stated on 6 July 2015 that the Southern Front is a coalition of Free Syrian Army brigades, which had made significant gains in Daraa Governorate.
5. Dutch newspaper NRC Handelsblad wrote on 10 October 2015: "Saudi Arabia is increasing its weapons deliveries to Syrian rebels. That concerns three different groups: Jaish al-Fatah, the Free Syrian Army, and the Southern Front."
6. The International Business Times on 12 March 2016 made mention of a ‘Southern Front’ which it describes as a group of Syrian opposition groups formerly members of FSA, focusing primarily on the Daraa and Quneitra governorates.

== History ==
=== Formation ===
In mid-February 2014, according to a Syrian rebel brigade officer, the Military Operations Command (MOC) in Jordan designed for channeling Western and Gulf aid to moderate rebel forces in southern Syria convened a meeting with leaders of nearly 50 southern rebel groups and directed them to create a new umbrella coalition. This resulted in the "Southern Front" being formed on 13 February 2014.

The formation of the front and its backing by Western forces challenged al-Nusra's military and political success in the region, though Southern Front units continued to cooperate with al-Nusra forces.

The Southern Front quickly became the largest rebel fighter umbrella organization in Southern Syria, comprising 25–30,000 fighters, the great majority of the South's rebel groups and manpower.

=== Initial growth ===
On 13 November 2014, it was reported that 15 factions of the Southern Front drew up a political program as an alternative to the exile-led opposition in Turkey, in which they planned to turn the Southern Front into a civilian security force. At the same time a provincial council was established. This political program was intended to have "broad appeal among Syrian civilians and to undercut support for more extreme interpretations of Islam that has been spreading".

Around that time, almost 40 small rebel groups joined the First Corps in the south.

On 27 December 2014, the 18 March Division, Yarmouk Army, Fallujah of Houran Brigade and Lions of Sunna Brigade merged under the command structure of the Hawks of the South coalition to strengthen the Southern Front.

On 1 January 2015, the Hamza Division, Syria Revolutionaries Front (SRF) southern command and 1st Artillery Regiment merged under the command structure of the First Army.

As of February 2015, Southern Front operations were executed through seven 'Southern Front operation rooms'.

On 15 May 2015, the Southern Front unified under one military council, chaired by 7 senior members. On 1 June 2015, the Southern Front paraded for the graduation of one thousand new members.

In June 2015, the SF launched Operation Southern Storm to take Deraa city's northern and eastern districts from government control. The operation was largely unsuccessful.

=== Decline from late 2015 ===
After Operation Southern Storm, SF declined in size and lost some of its support from the MOC. In late 2016, 58 groups were re-organized around four of the largest units with close ties to the MOC: Youth of Sunnah Brigade, Yarmouk Army, 24th Infantry Division and Amoud Houran Division.

On 18 June 2018, the Southern Front was hit by "Operation Basalt", a pro-government offensive in Daraa and Quneitra province. By 23 July the forces of the Southern Front were fully defeated and lost all territory that was under their control. Surrendering fighters either agreed to reconciliation deals or were relocated to Idlib.

=== Aftermath ===
Many of the "reconciled" fighters went on to participate in the Daraa insurgency, starting on 23 November 2018 (including the March 2020 Daraa clashes).

The rebranded Youth of Sunna Forces, known as the 8th Brigade, formed part of the Southern Operations Room in December 2024 and participated in the Fall of Damascus that same month.

== Support and funding ==
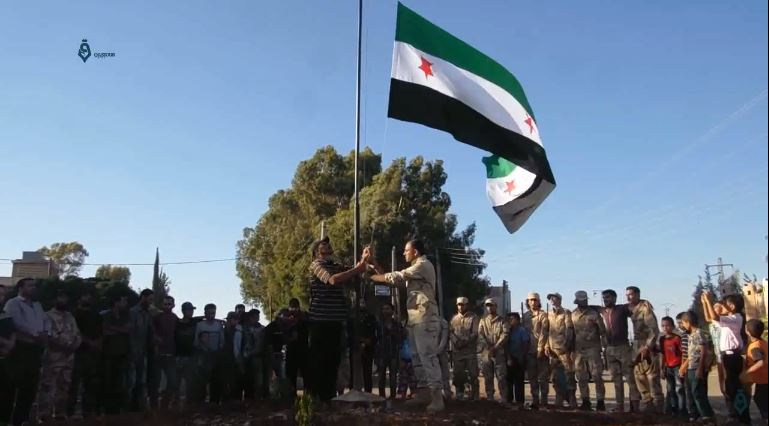
Southern Front fighters raise the Syrian independence flag, 2 August 2017.

General Ibrahim Jbawi, spokesperson for the Southern Front, stated in November 2014 that his group received money and weapons from the US, France, Jordan, and Saudi Arabia. Activists said that Jordan also facilitated the Southern Front by allowing them to cross freely to and from Jordan.

The Abu Dhabi (United Arab Emirates) based newspaper The National stated in November 2014 that the Military Operations Command center (MOC) in Amman, Jordan, staffed by "western and Arab military officials", had sent out food baskets to six rebel factions in southern Syria, presumably members of the Southern Front. The BBC stated in December 2014 that the Southern Front was "backed" through the Military Operations Center in Jordan, "a logistics and supply hub" run by the US with European and Arab allies. The German Heinrich Böll Foundation stated in 2015 that the Southern Front was being "funded" by a Military Operations Center (MOC) in Amman, Jordan which is run by "the US and its allies." No American official has yet admitted to the US supporting the Southern Front. The MOC has reportedly been inactive since 2017.

The National also reported that Southern Front members participating in the fight against the Syrian government receive $50–$100 per month while those who fight against ISIL receive $100–$250 per month from the MOC. However, the MOC threatened to cut funds unless the SF launched an offensive against ISIL.

The Southern Front itself, and media in Britain, Germany, and the United Arab Emirates, have stated that the Southern Front was funded by the US and its allies, possibly through a US-led Military Operations Center (MOC) based in Amman, Jordan. Since its formation, rebels said field operation rooms have been added inside Syria to improve coordination between units.

== Leadership ==
- Brig. Gen. Bashar al-Zoubi
  (former overall Leader)
- Brig. Gen. Ziad Fahd
  (Deputy Chief of Staff)
- Lt. Col. Majid al-Sayid Ahmed
  (Head of the Operations Department)
- Col. Saber Safar
  (Member of the Military Council)
- Col. Bakur Salim al-Salim †
  (Member of the Military Council)
- Col. Khaled al-Nabulsi
  (Member of the Military Council)
- Maj. Hassam Ibrahim
  (Member of the Military Council)
- Capt. Said Nakresh
  (Member of the Military Council)
- Ahmad al-Awda
  (Member of the Military Council)
- Samer al-Haboush
  (Member of the Military Council)
- Maj. Issam Rayes
  (Spokesperson)

== Military activities ==
=== Overview ===
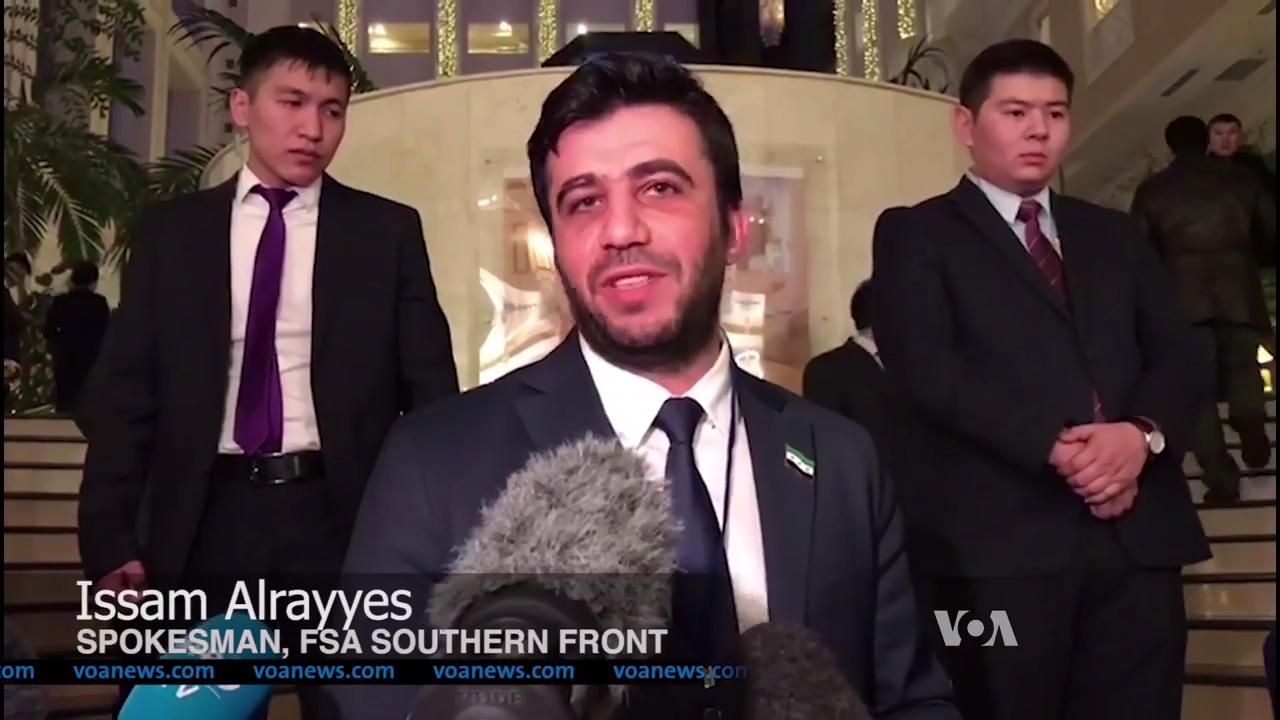
Maj. Issam Rayes, spokesperson of the Southern Front, during the Astana talks in January 2017

On 25 March 2015, the Southern Front captured the town of Bosra after a 3-day long battle.

On 1 April 2015, the Southern Front captured the Nasib border crossing, the last government-controlled border crossing into Jordan.

After the Southern Front's strategic victory at the capture of Brigade 52 in early June 2015, an analyst from the Institute for Strategic Studies stated that "The Southern Front is now showing itself as an increasingly effective buffer against Islamist rebels as well as an effective means for applying pressure on the Assad regime", and Southern Front spokesman Issam al-Reis stated that "We have most of Daraa liberated, our lines of defense behind us are solid, and now we can start the operation toward Damascus and the highway leading to it".

On 17 June 2015, the Southern Front launched an offensive to take all of Quneitra province.

On 25 June 2015, the Southern Front announced "Southern Storm", an offensive to capture Daraa city, where the Syrian Revolution began in 2012. By mid-August the offensive had failed to make significant advances, but the government had responded by increasing attacks on civilian neighborhoods, killing dozens of civilians, leading to public demonstrations against the Southern Front's failed strategy. An analysis by the Heinrich Böll Foundation suggested that the Southern Front had failed to receive significant support from the Military Operations Center in Jordan.

In July and August 2016, more than 200 rebels from the Southern Front defected to Jabhat Fateh al-Sham, successor to al-Nusra Front, and Ahrar al-Sham due to better pay and more willingness to fight government forces.

In the second half of 2016, Southern Front member groups were involved in failed operations against ISIS, those being the 2016 Abu Kamal offensive and the Eastern Qalamoun 2016 offensive.

On 12 February 2017, Free Syrian Army groups (Southern Front and the Army of Free Tribes), Tahrir al-Sham, Ahrar al-Sham, Jaysh al-Islam, Jabhat Ansar al-Islam, and Alwiya al-Furqan - working together as part of the Unified Ranks operations room - launched an offensive in Daraa. A week into the first phase of the offensive, ISIL also started an offensive against the Daraa-based rebels, lasting a week and resulting in an ISIL victory. Clashes between the Southern Front-led rebels and ISIL continued for the next few months.

After three phases, the rebels' Daraa offensive concluded on 6 June, resulting in a partial rebel victory. The following day, the government launched a counter-offensive. On 23 June, pro-government media reported that an attempt at a reconciliation deal fell apart, thus the Syrian Army resumed their offensive in the Palestinian Camp district, accompanied by airstrikes. The operation ended on the same day, with the government reportedly capturing at least 50% of the Daraa Refugee Camp

From 29 December 2016 to 30 April 2017, a myriad of groups that allegedly included Tahrir al-Sham launched a multi-phase operation in the Eastern Qalamoun Mountains and the Syrian Desert to expel the Islamic State of Iraq and the Levant from the desert in southern Syria and to open a supply route between two rebel-held areas. The operation was successful in pushing back ISIL, though they were unable to connect the two rebel-held areas due to heavy resistance from ISIS. During the operation, the government was also able to take territory from ISIL.

On 7 May, the government launched their desert campaign that initially started along the highway from Damascus to the border with Iraq against rebel forces. Its first intended goal was to capture both the highway and the al-Tanf border crossing, thus securing the Damascus countryside from a potential rebel attack, later, multiple other fronts were opened as part of the operation throughout the desert, as well as operation "Grand Dawn" against ISIL to reopen the Damascus-Palmyra highway and prepare for an offensive towards Deir ez-Zor. The operation resulted in the Syrian Army encircling the rebel-held Eastern Qalamoun pocket and at the same time erasing the front line between rebel forces and ISIL in the An-Tanf area.

On 24 June 2017, Tahrir al-Sham, FSA groups, and other rebels reportedly established the Army of Muhammad operations room and launched a new Quneitra offensive, targeting the town of Madinat al-Baath, also known as Baath City. The offensive lasted a week, resulting in a government victory, reversing all rebel gains during the offensive. During the fighting, two stray artillery rounds hit the Israeli-occupied Golan Heights, prompting Israeli forces to target the Syrian military artillery position which according to them was the source of the firing.

On 3 July 2017, a four-day ceasefire was announced by the government, in opposition-held southern Syria.

As a precursor to Astana 5 peace talks, on 9 July 2017 at 0900 GMT, an American-Russian-Jordanian brokered ceasefire commenced, though on 14 July, opposition groups participating in the Quneitra offensive rejected the ceasefire, with clashes resuming across Southern Syria. Besides minor violations from all sides involved, as of 15 July, the ceasefire as held. The Southern Front boycotted these talks.

Many of the "reconciled" fighters have gone on to participate in the Daraa insurgency, starting on 23 November 2018 (including the March 2020 Daraa clashes).

=== List of battles ===
Date	Battle	Place	Against	Result
3 February – 27 May 2014	Daraa offensive (February–May 2014)	Daraa Governorate, Quneitra Governorate, and As-Suwayda Governorate, Syria	(Syria) Syrian Arab Republic: Syrian Armed Forces; National Defense Force; Hezbollah; Arab Nationalist Guard	Indecisive: Rebels capture the Gharaz central prison, Daraa grain silos, three villages, five strategic hills, Battalion 508 and Brigade 61 HQ.; Rebels temporarily lift the siege of Nawa, before it was besieged again; Rebel attack on Busra al-Sham repelled; Army captures two areas south of Quneitra city, and Tal Buraq hill
27 August – 23 September 2014	2014 Quneitra offensive	Quneitra Governorate and Daraa Governorate, Syria	(Syria) Syrian Arab Republic: Syrian Armed Forces; National Defense Force; (United Nations) UNDOF	Rebel victory: Rebels take control of about 80 percent of towns and villages in Quneitra province and seize the Syrian-controlled side of the Golan.; Rebels capture the Quneitra Crossing, Rebels pull back from western Damascus countryside into northern Daraa countryside; Al-Nusra Front takes 45 U.N. peacekeepers hostage on 28 August; Army counter-attack on Mashara repelled.
3–6 October 2014	Daraa offensive (October 2014)	Daraa Governorate, Syria	(Syria) Syrian Arab Republic: Syrian Armed Forces; National Defense Force; Supported by: Russia (alleged)	Rebel victory: Army counter-attack on Deir al-Adas repelled; Rebels capture al-Harrah town, two villages, three checkpoints, Tell al-Harrah and its radar base
1 November 2014 – 15 December 2014	Battle of Al-Shaykh Maskin (2014)	Daraa Governorate, Syria	(Syria) Syrian Arab Republic: Syrian Armed Forces; National Defence Force; Hezbollah; Kata'ib Sayyid al-Shuhada	Partial rebel victory: Rebels capture Nawa, three strategical hills, seven bases, the Hawi checkpoint and the al-Dalli area; Rebels break the siege of Al-Shaykh Maskin and Nawa; Al-Shaykh Maskin divided between a rebel-held west and government-held east
24–31 January 2015	Daraa offensive (January 2015)	Daraa Governorate, Syria	(Syria) Syrian Arab Republic: Syrian Armed Forces; Syrian Army; National Defence Force; Hezbollah; Iraqi Kata'ib Sayyid al-Shuhada	Rebel victory: Rebels capture the Brigade 82 base and Shaykh Maskin; Army claims to have recaptured the Faroun Storage Facility, Oxygen Plant and Niqta Al-Masarat
7 February – 13 March 2015	2015 Southern Syria offensive	Daraa Governorate, Rif Dimashq Governorate and Quneitra Governorate, Syria	Pro-government forces; (Syria) Syrian Arab Republic; Syrian Armed Forces; National Defence Force; IRGC; Quds Force; Liwa Fatemiyoun; Allied Militias: Hezbollah; Kata'ib Sayyid al-Shuhada; Jaysh al-Wafaa	indecisive: Phase one: Syrian Army and allies victory; Phase two: Stalemate; Government forces capture seven towns and villages and eight hills
21–25 March 2015	Battle of Bosra (2015)	Bosra, Daraa Governorate, Syria	(Syria) Syrian Arab Republic: Syrian Arab Army; National Defense Force Hezbollah Lions of Hussein Iranian IRGC Imam Ali Brigades	Rebel victory: Rebels capture Bosra
1 April 2015	Battle of Nasib Border Crossing	Nasib Border Crossing, Jordanian–Syrian border, Daraa Governorate, Syria	(Syria) Syrian Arab Republic: Syrian Armed Forces; National Defense Force	Rebel victory: Rebels capture the Nasib border crossing and the border area between Nasib and Amman
9–18 June 2015	Daraa and As-Suwayda offensive (June 2015)	Daraa Governorate and As-Suwayda Governorate, Syria	(Syria) Syrian Arab Republic; Druze armed groups	Partial Southern Front-led rebel victory: Rebels capture Brigade 52, al-Rakham, al-Meleha al-Gharbia, al-Koum checkpoint and Sakakah; SAA recaptures Sakakah; Rebels temporally seized the western half of the Al-Tha'lah airbase, before being forced to retreat the next day
16–26 June 2015	Quneitra offensive (June 2015)	Quneitra Governorate, Syria	(Syria) Syrian Arab Republic: Syrian Armed Forces; National Defense Force; Golan Regiment	Indecisive; Minimal rebel gains
25 June – 10 July 2015	Daraa offensive (June–July 2015)	Daraa, Daraa Governorate, Syria	(Syria) Syrian Arab Republic; Hezbollah	Syrian Army victory
2–24 October 2015	Quneitra offensive (October 2015)	Quneitra Governorate, Syria	(Syria) Syrian Arab Republic: Syrian Armed Forces; National Defense Force	Syrian Army victory: Rebels capture the 4th Battalion base, Tall Ahmar and UN hill; Army recaptures all territory lost
27 December 2015 – 25 January 2016	Battle of Al-Shaykh Maskin (2015–2016)	Al-Shaykh Maskin, Daraa Governorate, Syria	(Syria) Syrian Arab Republic: Syrian Armed Forces; National Defense Force; Hezbollah; Palestine Liberation Army; Russia: Russian Air Force	Syrian Army victory: The Army captures Al-Shaykh Maskin town and the Brigade 82 base
3 – 5 March 2016	Al-Tanf offensive (2016)	Al-Tanf, Homs Governorate, Syria	ISIL	FSA victory: Rebels capture the Al-Tanf border post and immediate surroundings
21 March – 8 April 2016	Daraa offensive (March–April 2016)	Daraa Governorate, Syria	Islamic State	Rebel victory: ISIL captures nine towns and villages; Rebels recapture all towns and villages from ISIL; Pro-opposition "al-Murabitin Brigade" defects from the pro-ISIL Islamic Muthanna Movement; Islamic Muthanna Movement loses almost all of its territory and merges with the Yarmouk Martyrs Brigade
28–29 June 2016	2016 Abu Kamal offensive	Abu Kamal District, Deir-Ez-Zor Governorate, Syria	Islamic State: Wilayat al-Furat	ISIL victory: The FSA withdraws from all positions it had captured back to its base at al-Tanf
3 September – 15 October 2016	Eastern Qalamoun offensive (September–October 2016)	Eastern Qalamoun Mountains, Rif Dimashq Governorate, Syria	Islamic State of Iraq and the Levant	Both sides capture or recapture territory; Government forces bombard ISIL positions in the region
29 December 2016 – 30 April 2017	Syrian Desert campaign (December 2016 – April 2017)	Syrian Desert, Syria: As Suwayda Governorate; Rif Dimashq Governorate; Eastern Homs Governorate; Eastern Deir ez-Zor Governorate	Islamic State	Rebel victory: Syrian opposition captures more than 1,800 square kilometres (~695 square miles) of territory from ISIL; Syrian government captures more than 300 square kilometres (~116 square miles) of territory from ISIL in north-eastern Suwayda Governorate; ISIL expelled from the Suwayda Governorate and the eastern slopes of the Qalamoun mountains
12 February – 6 June 2017	Daraa offensive (February–June 2017)	Daraa, Daraa Governorate, Syria	(Syria) Syrian Arab Republic: Syrian Armed Forces; Iran; Russia; Hezbollah; Fatah al-Intifada	Rebel victory: Rebels initially captures a large part of the al-Manishiyah District, but the offensive soon stalled; The Syrian Army recaptures almost all lost positions, leaving less than 25% of al-Manishiyah rebel-held; Renewed rebel attack leaves the rebels in control of 95% of al-Manishiyah
20–27 February 2017	Southwestern Daraa offensive (February 2017)	Southwestern Daraa Governorate, Syria	Islamic State	ISIL victory: ISIL captured Tasil, four other towns and villages, two bases and two hills; Rebels recaptured two villages
7–23 June 2017	Daraa offensive (June 2017)	Daraa, Daraa Governorate, Syria	(Syria) Syrian Arab Republic: Syrian Armed Forces; Iran; Russia; Allied militias: Hezbollah; Lebanese Ba'ath Party; Liwa Fatemiyoun	Indecisive: Syrian Army captures at least 50% of the Daraa Refugee Camp
24 June – 1 July 2017	Quneitra offensive (June 2017)	Madinat al-Baath, Quneitra Governorate, Syria	(Syria) Syrian Government	Syrian government victory
7 May – 13 July 2017	Syrian Desert campaign (May–July 2017)	Syrian Desert, Syria: South, eastern and central Homs Governorate; Eastern as-Suwayda Governorate; South and eastern Rif Dimashq Governorate	(Syria) Syrian Arab Republic: Syrian Armed Forces; Pro-gov. militias; Russia; Allied militias: PMF-affiliated militias Hezbollah; Liwa Fatemiyoun; Supported by: UAE; Egypt Islamic State of Iraq and the Levant (since 23 May)	Decisive Syrian Army and allies victory: In late May, Syrian Army captured over 20,000 km2 of territory, including the Damascus–Palmyra highway and a large part of the eastern half of As-Suwayda province; Syrian Army secured part of Syrian–Iraqi border for the first time since 2015, at the same time erasing the frontline between US-backed forces and ISIL; Syrian Army approaches and enters the province of Deir ez-Zor Governorate from the south, cutting the Al-Qaim-Al-Sukhnah road[citation needed]; By mid-July, Syrian Army captured 3,000 km2 of territory from the FSA in the northeastern part As-Suwayda province and southern Rif Dimashq province
18 June – 31 July 2018	2018 Southern Syria offensive	Southern Syria: Daraa Governorate; Western Suwayda Governorate; Quneitra Governorate	(Syria) Syrian Government; Russia (since 24 June); Iran; Allied militias: Palestine Liberation Army; Liwa al-Quds; Shia Iraqi militias Hezbollah (rebel claim); Liwa Abu al-Fadhal al-Abbas; Liwa Fatemiyoun; Ba'ath Brigades; As-Sa'iqa; SSNP; Druze militias Islamic State (since 10 July)	Decisive Syrian Army victory: Syrian Army brings the entire Daraa border with Jordan and the Golan Heights frontier under its full control

== Member groups ==
- First Corps
  - 8th Infantry Brigade
  - 19th Infantry Brigade
  - 21st Infantry Division
  - 55th Infantry Brigade
  - 99th Infantry Division
  - Victory Division
  - Dawn of Liberation Division
  - Knights of Freedom Division
  - Oasifat Free South Division
  - Sajeel Division
  - Company of Dignity Division
  - Harra Martyrs Brigade
- Revolutionary Army
  - Yarmouk Army
  - Mu'tazz Billah Brigade
  - Muhajireen and Ansar Brigade
  - Hasan ibn Ali Brigade
  - Dawn of Islam Division
  - Firqat Ahrar Nawa
- First Gathering
  - 3rd Brigade
  - 86th Infantry Brigade
  - Ansar al-Haqq Battalion
  - Barq Islam Brigade
  - Bayareq Islam Battalion
  - Norman Bin Monther Battalion
  - Osod Yarmouk Battalion
  - Shabab Horiyah Brigade
  - Shahid Tareq Sbihi Battalion
  - Soyof Tahrir
- Southern Brigades
  - Al Mukhtar Brigade
  - Descendants of Ibn al-Walid Brigade
  - Free Daraa Brigade
  - Supporters of the Sunna Brigade
  - Farouq Mujahideen Brigade
  - Al-Amryn al-Islami Brigade
  - Northern Commandos Brigade
  - Qastat of Muslims Brigade
  - Soldiers of Islam Brigade
  - Al-Murabitun Brigade
  - Servants of al-Rahman Division
  - Tawhid Army
- Alliance of Southern Forces
  - Omari Brigades
  - 18 March Division
  - Salvation Army
  - Division of Decisiveness
  - 46th Infantry Division
  - 1st Special Tasks Brigade
  - Brigade of Dignity
- Southern Alliance
  - Syria Revolutionaries Front
    - Jaydour Horan Brigade
    - Coming Victory Brigade
    - 7th Division
    - Riyad al-Salehin Battalions of Damascus
    - Special Assignments Regiment of Damascus
    - Helpers Brigades
    - Southern Swords Division
    - Martyr Captain Abu Hamza al-Naimi Union
    - 63rd Southern Division
  - 1st Infantry Division
- Saif al-Sham Brigade
- Hamza Division
- Lions of Sunna Brigade
- Tawhid Kataʼib Horan
- Quneitra Military Council
- Youth of Sunna Forces
- Alwiya al-Furqan
- 406th Infantry Division
- Quneitra and the Golan Heights Military Council

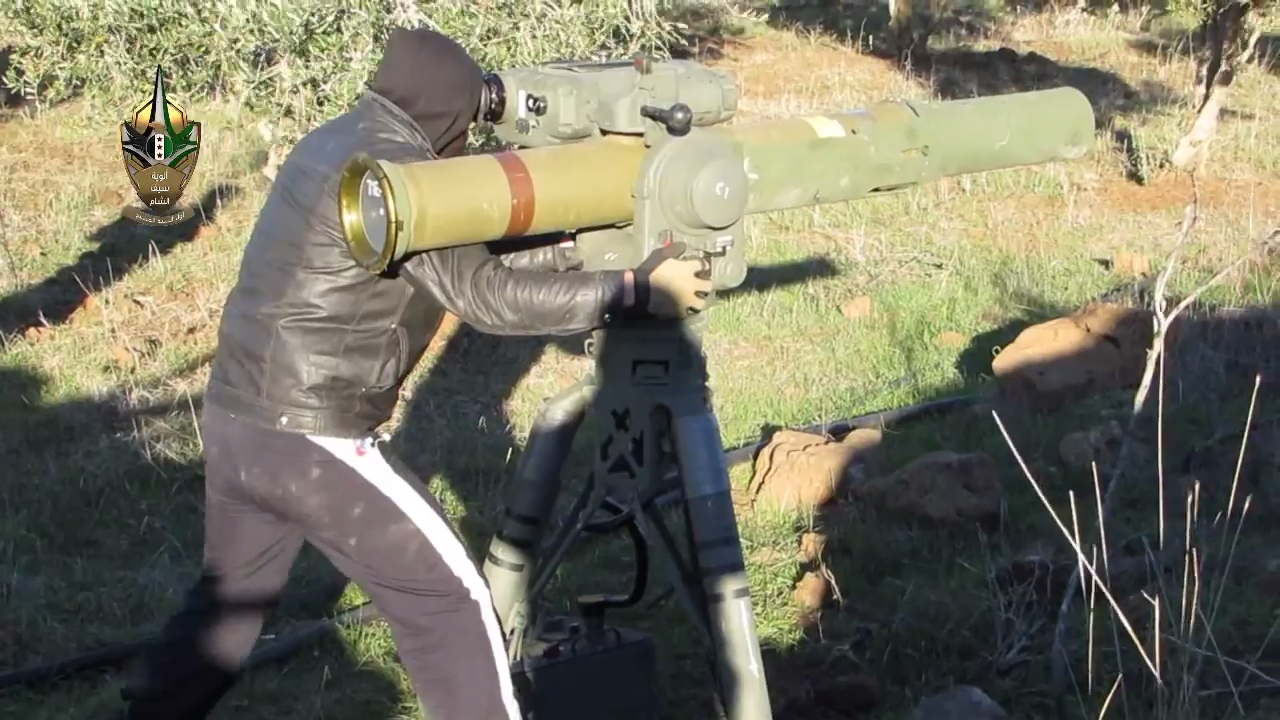
A Sword of al-Sham Brigades (Ezz Brigade's Jesus Christ Brigade) fighter prepares to launch a BGM-71 TOW missile.

- Golan Knights Brigade
- Supporters of al-Huda
- Mutasim Billah Brigadel
- Western Countryside Freemen Battalion
- Martyrs of Damascus Brigades
- Martyrs of Al-Hara Brigade
- Al-Sabtain Brigade

== Former groups ==
- First Army (dissolved)
- Hawks of the South (dissolved)
- Daraa Military Council (dissolved)
- 11th Special Forces Division (left in September 2015 during the establishment of the Company of the People of the Levant, joining the Sham Liberation Army).
- Douma Martyrs Brigade (left to form Jaysh al-Ummah, which dissolved in 2015)
- 1st Brigade of Damascus (left in May 2016, joined al-Rahman Legion, became independent shortly after)
- Yarmouk Martyrs Brigade (joined ISIL)
- Martyrs of Islam Brigade (left after the September 2016 Daraya evacuation)
- Lions of the Asima Brigade (left the Lions of the East Army to join the 8th Brigade of Jaysh al-Islam)
- Aisha, Mother of Believers Brigade (left the Southern Brigades to join Jaysh al-Islam's 8th Brigade)
- Commandos of the Desert Brigade (defected from the Lions of the East Army to join the SAA)
- Omar Bin Al-Khattab Brigade (defected from the SRF around 2017 to join the SAA)
- National Front for the Liberation of Syria member groups
  - Jabhat Ansar al-Islam
  - Dawn of Unity Division (left the Division of Decisiveness of the Alliance of Southern Forces)
  - Saladin Division (left the Alliance of Southern Forces)
  - Damascus Martyrs Brigade
  - Qadisiya Division
  - Shield of the Nation Brigade
  - 1st Commandos Division
- Forces of Martyr Ahmad al-Abdo (left after the April 2018 Eastern Qalamoun evacuation)
- Lions of the East Army (left after the April 2018 Eastern Qalamoun evacuation)
- Jaysh al-Ababil left the Southern Alliance in July 2018 to establish the Army of the South, in response to the encirclement of Daraa city that same month.

== See also ==
- List of armed groups in the Syrian Civil War
