= Alliance of Southern Forces =

Syrian rebel coalition

- تحالف قوات الجنوب
- Leaders: Col. Qassem al-Hariri (Division of Decisiveness); Col. Ahmed al-Omar (Division of Decisiveness); Col. Jihad Saad al-Din (Division of Decisiveness); Col. Mohammed Khaled al-Duhni (18 March Division); Col. Yusuf al-Mir’i (46th Infantry Division); Mohamed al-Asaad (46th Infantry Division); Mazen Jawad † ("Abu Walid" – Free Nawa Division)
- Dates active: 9 February 2017 – 31 July 2018
- Active regions: Daraa Governorate; Quneitra Governorate
- Part of: (Syrian opposition) Free Syrian Army: Southern Front
- Wars: the Syrian Civil War

The Alliance of Southern Forces was a Syrian rebel coalition consisting of 8 rebel factions from the Free Syrian Army's Southern Front. The group operated in southwestern Syria. The coalition supported the High Negotiations Committee and its participation in the Geneva peace talks on Syria.

== Member groups ==
- Omari Brigades
- 18 March Division
  - Martyr Houran
  - Liberation of Houran
  - Engineering and Rocket Battalion
- Division of Decisiveness
  - Houran Column Division
  - Subject of Islam Brigade
  - Martyrs of Freedom Division
- Division of Righteousness
- 46th Infantry Division
  - 24th Infantry Division
  - 69th Special Forces Division
    - Free Men of Inkhil Brigade
    - Murabitun Brigade
    - Lions of Islam Brigade
    - Fath al-Mubin Brigade
  - Al-Bayt Brigade
- 1st Special Tasks Brigade
- Salvation Army
  - Free Nawa Division
    - 8th Infantry Division
  - Martyr Jamil Abu Zain Sharaf Division
  - Special Task Force Division
- Brigade of Dignity

== History ==
On 19 May 2017, Mazen Jawad, also known by his nom de guerre Abu Walid, a commander of the Free Nawa Division of the Alliance of Southern Forces, was assassinated by unknown assailants at his home in Inkhil.

== See also ==
- First Army (Syrian rebel group)
- Hawks of the South
