= Forces of Martyr Ahmad al-Abdo =

Syrian armed group

- قوات الشهيد أحمد العبدو
- Leaders: Colonel Bakur Salim al-Salim †; Captain Ahmed al-Tamer
- Dates active: August 2013–January 2025
- Group: Syrian Desert Brigade
- Active regions: Rif Dimashq Governorate (until April 2018); Al-Tanf base (since March 2016); Northern Aleppo Governorate (since April 2018)
- Size: 2,500 (2017, self-claim)
- Part of: (Syrian opposition) Free Syrian Army: Southern Front (until April 2018)
- Wars: the Syrian civil war
- Website: http://www.qalamon.com/

The Forces of Martyr Ahmad al-Abdo was a Syrian rebel group previously affiliated with the Free Syrian Army's Southern Front. The group was named after either Ahmad al-Abdo al-Saeed, a Syrian civilian who was killed in the early 2011 protests, or first lieutenant Ahmad al-Abdo, a rebel commander who was killed in action during the war. The group received support from the Friends of Syria Group.

== Structure and equipment ==
As of 2017, the group claimed to have 2,000 fighters, including 500 defected soldiers and 30 officers from the Syrian Arab Armed Forces. The head of the group was the "joint command council", led by Captain Ahmed al-Tamer.

Fighters in the group typically operated in groups of 10. Its main equipment were Toyota Land Cruiser and Toyota Hilux gun trucks mounted with various weaponry including autocannons, heavy machine guns, recoilless rifles, and multiple rocket launchers. It also operated at least 1 T-62 and 2 T-55s.

The group received BGM-71 TOW missiles as one of the first rebel groups to do so in May 2014 and was also in possession of Chinese HJ-8 and Russian 9M133 Kornet anti-tank missiles paid by Qatar and supplied from Sudan.

== History ==
The group was involved in the capture of the Brigade 559 and the siege of al-Dumayr airbase. It primarily operated in the eastern Qalamoun Mountains and northern Damascus countryside regions. In March 2016, the group and the US-backed New Syrian Army captured the al-Tanf border crossing from the ISIL in a cross-border raid.

On 9 June 2016, the group's leader, Colonel Bakour Salim, who was also the commander of the Damascus Military Council from 2012 to 2013, died in an ISIL suicide bombing after the group advanced and captured several ISIL positions. Later in June, the FMAA and the NSA were hit by air strikes from 2 Russian Sukhoi Su-34s and participated in the failed 2016 Abu Kamal offensive against the ISIL.

A new commander, Captain Ahmed al-Tamer, was appointed on 30 August 2016 after the previous commander was dismissed for alleged corruption.

Since 2016, the opposition local council of towns in the eastern Qalamoun Mountains has negotiated a ceasefire agreement with the Ba'athist government forces. As a result, the group abided by it and focused its fighting against the ISIL. As part of the Southern Front, the group also abided by a ceasefire in effect since the January 2017 Astana talks. In an interview with the group's commander in February 2017, he announced that the group would support an international attempt for a ceasefire in Syria.

In April 2018, along with other rebel groups in the eastern Qalamoun, some fighters of the Forces of Martyr Ahmad al-Abdo were evacuated to the Turkish-occupied zone in the northern Aleppo Governorate, while others retreated to the al-Rukban camp and al-Tanf Garrison.

In August 2022, the Forces of Martyr Ahmad al-Abdo repaired two wells in Al-Rukban, after locals complained the water was mixed with sediment.

== See also ==
- List of armed groups in the Syrian Civil War
- List of military units named after people
