= Lions of Sunna Brigade =

Free Syrian Army group fighting under the banner of the Southern Front

- The flag has three stripes. It is green, white, and black with three red stars in the center.
- Leader: Capt. Abdul Hakim
- Dates active: 2014-2018
- Active regions: Daraa Governorate
- Part of: Free Syrian Army; Southern Front; Hawks of the South (formerly)
- Wars: the Syrian civil war

The Lions of Sunna Brigade (Arabic: لواء أسود السنة, romanized: Liwā Aswād as-Sunnah) was a Free Syrian Army group fighting under the banner of the Southern Front. It joined the Hawks of the South coalition on 27 December 2014.

== See also ==
- List of armed groups in the Syrian Civil War
