= 18 March Division =

- Arabic: فرقة 18 آذار
- Leaders: Col. Mohammed Khaled al-Duhni; Hosam Abazid †
- Dates active: 11 April 2013 – 31 July 2018
- Groups: Martyr Houran; Liberation of Houran; Engineering and Rocket Battalion; Southern Tawhid Brigade (former)
- Active regions: Daraa Governorate
- Part of: Free Syrian Army: Southern Front; Alliance of Southern Forces
- Wars: the Syrian Civil War

The 18 March Division (Arabic: فرقة 18 آذار) was a rebel group part of the Free Syrian Army. The 18 March Division named after the 18 March 2011 protests in Daraa and was active during the Syrian Civil War. The group was created on 11 April 2013 by Colonel Mohammed Khaled al-Duhni out of three affiliated groups. On 18 July 2013, the Southern Tawhid Brigade, one of the affiliated groups, left the 18 March Division due to internal disputes. It joined the Southern Front on 14 February 2014, and also joined the Hawks of the South alliance on 27 December 2014.

== History ==
In April 2015, after five Southern Front groups unilaterally rejected all forms of cooperation with the al-Nusra Front, the 18 March Division clashed with al-Nusra in the Daraa al-Balad district of Daraa. Conflicting reports stated that the al-Nusra Front captured a member of the Southern Tawhid Brigade and threw a grenade at the latter group's headquarters.

On 28 September 2016, one of the group's field commanders, Hosam Abazid, was assassinated in the eastern Daraa countryside. Hosam Abazid was previously a member of the al-Nusra Front, then defected to the Southern Tawhid Brigade, then to the Islamic Muthanna Movement, and re-defected back to the 18 March Division.

== See also ==
- List of armed groups in the Syrian Civil War
