= Hawks of the South =

Free Syrian Army coalition

- صقور الجنوب; Tahalaf Suqour al-Janoub
- The flag has three stripes. It is green, white, and black with three red stars in the center.
- Leader: Col. Mohammed Khaled al-Duhni
- Dates active: 27 December 2014 - ? (inactive)
- Active regions: Daraa Governorate
- Size: 5,000+
- Part of: Free Syrian Army; Southern Front
- Wars: the Syrian Civil War

The Hawks of the South (Tahalaf Suqour al-Janoub) was a Free Syrian Army coalition that was active during the Syrian Civil War. It was created on 27 December 2014 by Colonel Mohammed Khaled al-Duhni to strengthen the Southern Front. The coalition operated in eastern Daraa Governorate. According to the colonel, the Falcons of the South was the biggest rebel group operating in Daraa Governorate in regard to arms and fighters.

== Former member groups ==
- 18 March Division
- Yarmouk Army
- Fallujah of Horan Brigade
- Lions of Sunna Brigade

== See also ==
- List of armed groups in the Syrian Civil War
