= First Corps (Syrian rebel group) =

- Dates active: 2015-2018
- Groups: 8th Infantry Brigade; 19th Infantry Brigade; 21st Infantry Division; 55th Infantry Brigade; 99th Infantry Division; Victory Division; Dawn of Liberation Division; Saladin Division; Knights of Freedom Division; Oasifat Free South Division; Sajeel Division; Company of Dignity Division; Harra Martyrs Brigade; Wa'Aeddu Brigade
- Active regions: Southern Syria
- Part of: Free Syrian Army; Southern Front
- Wars: the Syrian Civil War

The First Corps was a Syrian rebel coalition active during the Syrian Civil War. It is part of the western backed Syrian rebel Southern Front. On 13 April 2015, it joined a number of other Southern Front affiliates in condemning al-Nusra's ideology and discontinuing all forms of cooperation with it.

== See also ==
- List of armed groups in the Syrian Civil War
