= Al-Bunyan al-Marsous Operations Room =

Militant group

- Active regions: Daraa Governorate, Syria
- Part of: Central Operations Room
- Wars: Syrian civil war

The Al-Bunyan al-Marsous Operations Room (also transliterated as al-Banyan al-Marsous Operations Room) is a coalition of insurgent groups active in Daraa Governorate, Syria during the Syrian civil war.

== Composition ==
The operations room includes southern factions of the Free Syrian Army, Jaysh Al-Yarmouk, Hay'at Tahrir al-Sham, Ahrar al-Sham, Jaysh al-Islam and Jamaat Bayt al-Maqdis al-Islamiya. Members of the Islamic Muthanna Movement defected from ISIS in late March 2016, forming the al-Murabitin Brigade. The brigade emphasized that it was part of the operations room.

== History ==
The operations room launched a battle for the al-Manshiyah neighborhood in Daraa in February 2017, to control the Daraa Border Crossing. The battle lasted until May 2017.

The spokesperson of the operations room is Abu Shaimaa.
