= Army of Free Tribes =

Syrian rebel coalition

- جيش أحرار العشائر; Jaysh Ahrar al-Ashayer
- Leader: Brig. Gen. Ibrahim Fahad Al Naimi
- Dates active: 5 September 2014 – Unknown
- Active regions: Al-Tanf (as of July 2018)
- Ideology: Syrian nationalism
- Size: 3,000-4,000
- Part of: (Syrian opposition) Free Syrian Army; (Syrian opposition) Southern Front
- Wars: the Syrian civil war

The Army of Free Tribes (Arabic: جيش أحرار العشائر, romanized: Jaysh Ahrar al-Ashayer), previously called the Southern Command and the Collective of Free Southern Tribesmen, is a Syrian rebel coalition affiliated with the Free Syrian Army and was headed by Brigadier General Ibrahim Fahad Al Naimi. The group was supported by Jordan.

== History ==
The Southern Command of the Free Syrian Army was established on 5 September 2014 in the Quneitra Governorate. The group's commander, Brig. Gen. Ibrahim Fahad al-Naimi, threatened to arrest any rebel deserting the group.

It was reported on 3 November 2014 that the Southern Command convinced the al-Nusra Front to leave Ghadir al-Bustan and al-Qseibah villages in the Quneitra Governorate, some miles away from the Golan Heights.

After the fall of the Assad regime and the civil war ended, opposition forces at Al-Tanf base were incorporated into the newly formed Ministry of Defense, and it is unclear whether the coalition still exists.

== Member groups ==
- Division 70
- Division 90
- Brigade Corps 72
- Infantry Brigade 71
- Infantry Brigade 73
- Infantry Brigade 305
- Brigade 51
- Brigade 52
- Brigade 53
- Brigade 91
- Brigade 92
- Brigade 93
- Brigade 94
- Brigade 95
- Tank Battalion 911
- Sapper Battalion 50
- "Knights of Sharia" Battalion
- Special Tasks Battalion
- "Horan" Commando Battalion
- Martyrs Brigade of Nawa
- The Banner of the Liberation of Nawa
- Omar Mukhtar Brigade
- Supporters of the Rightfulness Brigade
- Assault Brigade Horan
- Abdullah Hourani Brigade
- Special Brigade of South Farouq
- Homs Walid Brigade
- Martyr Imad Nasrallah Brigade
- Southern Hawks Brigade

== See also ==
- List of armed groups in the Syrian Civil War
