= 2021 Daraa offensive =

Military operation

- Part of the Daraa insurgency of the Syrian civil war
- Locations of the clashes
Date	29 July – 5 September 2021 (1 month and 1 week)
Location	Daraa Governorate, Syria
Result	Syrian government victory
Territorial changes	Rebels storm 18 checkpoints; Russian military police and Syrian state security enter Daraa al-Balad; Syrian and Russian flags raised in the neighborhood

Belligerents
(Syria) Syrian Government	Reconciled rebels Syrian opposition loyalists 8th Brigade of the 5th Assault Corps (occasional clashes)

Commanders and leaders
Firas Issa; Unnamed Brigadier †	Unknown; Mohamed Hilal Zatima †

Units involved
Syrian Armed Forces; Syrian Army; 4th Division; 5th Division; 9th Division; Military Intelligence Directorate; Air Force Intelligence Directorate	Anti-government militants Armed locals

Casualties and losses
26 killed 40 captured	17 killed
- 22 civilians killed

The 2021 Daraa offensive was an offensive between rebel fighters and Syrian government forces in the Daraa Governorate, as part of the Daraa insurgency. The offensive saw heavy clashes throughout the governorate, particularly in the Daraa al-Balad neighborhood, which was besieged by government troops.

The clashes were the fiercest Daraa had witnessed since the Syrian Army 2018 offensive.

== Background ==
The southern city of Daraa, Daraa al-Balad, was where the civil uprising against the Syrian government started in March 2011. Therefore, it was a major blow for the rebels when they were defeated in the province in 2018. Reconciliation deals were made in Daraa, where they had to return their "heavy weapons" and in Nawa, where the rebels had to surrender their "military hardware" to the Syrian Army. Those militants who did not accept the deal were transferred to the Idlib Governorate. Despite recapturing all lost territories, the Syrian Army was not able to deploy troops across the entire province. This caused rising insurgency attacks and assassinations among government forces.

By the end of June, Russia urged new reconciliation deals to seize personal weapons of the people in Daraa city. The demand was widely rejected across the area. Following the rejection of the Russian demands, Syrian Army security forces imposed a siege on the neighbourhoods of Daraa al-Balad to exert pressure on the residents of the city. As a result, 11,000 Syrian families were besieged after the former FSA fighters refused to hand over their weapons. The persistent siege led to extortionate prices on goods and limited availability of drinking water. After a few weeks the negotiation committees of Daraa and the Syrian government reached an agreement to end the siege and evade a military escalation. The deal will be implemented as a five-phase agreement in which all roads will be reopened, rebel light weapons will be handed over and the government can keep three checkpoints in the city.

== Clashes ==
Despite the agreement with the negotiation committees to evade a military operation, the Syrian Army started to fire artillery shells towards insurgent cells in Daraa city on 29 July 2021. Syrian Army sources described the attack as “start of a military operation against hideouts of terrorists who thwarted a reconciliation deal.” According to a pro-government military officer, notables in Daraa's al-Balad district had promised the government forces to peacefully hand over the weapons of local insurgents. However, this transfer did not come to pass, and disputes devolved into fighting. In contrast, pro-opposition figures accused the government of failure to adhere to the agreement including promises to stay out of al-Balad district.

The government's operation led to actions of retaliation by rebels across the province. The fighters involved in the attack are former rebel fighters that surrendered to the government in 2018, as well as former rebels that defected to the government, and had been working against the government from within. Anti-government fighters seized several checkpoints and captured many surprised Syrian Army soldiers and Military Intelligence Directorate agents. While the Syrian Army's 4th Division was leading the anti-rebel operations, the overrun checkpoints mostly belonged to the 5th Division, 9th Division, and Air Force Intelligence Directorate. Overall, 18 positions in the countryside east and west of Daraa were captured by armed locals.

The ex-rebels then offered new negotiations, but the government initially maintained its stance that weaponry had to be handed over and all non-reconciled insurgents had to be transferred to the still rebel-held Idlib Governorate. Both sides agreed to a ceasefire for 30–31 July after negotiations organized by the Russians and military officer Ahmad al-Awda. On 31 July, the situation remained tense, but most areas adhered to the ceasefire. There were sporadic instances of government forces firing at residential areas in Daraa al-Balad, Jasim, Muzayrib, and near Tafas, while an armed group consisting of ex-insurgents organized a curfew in al-Shajara.

On 5 August, after several days of tense calm, rebels targeted a Syrian army vehicle on the road between Nahtah and Basr al-Harir in eastern Daraa countryside, leaving a soldier dead and six others wounded. There was also reported rocket fire by the Syrian army, targeting the town of Nahtah.

On 14 August, hours before talks were set to take place between the Central Committee and Russian delegations, the Syrian Army bombarded Daraa al-Balad, killing one civilian.

On 16 August, a member of the Syrian Army's 4th Division was shot dead by unknown gunmen in Maskin city in the north-western countryside of Daraa. A civilian was also killed by gunmen in al-Sanamayn city, after being accused of “dealing with the military security service and snitching on oppositionists”.

On 19 August, an IED targeted a Syrian army convoy of the 112th Brigade on the al-Shabrouq road between the two towns of Nafaa and Ain Zakr in west of Daraa countryside, killing six Syrian soldiers and militiamen, including a brigadier.

On 20 August, Syrian artillery shelling in Daraa al-Balad killed Mohamed Hilal Zatima, a reconciled commander of the Free Syrian Army.

On 25 August, it was reported by the Syrian Observatory for Human Rights and pro-government media that a truce and evacuation was agreed between Syrian rebels and Syrian Armed forces. Rebels forces will be allowed to leave Darás toward Syria's North (Idlib) in turn Syrian Armed forces could enter Daraa al-Balad.

On 26 August, one Syrian soldier was killed and four others were wounded after an IED exploded targeting a Syrian army vehicle on the road between Nawa and Sheikh Maskeen. This follows Syrian army bombardments on Tafas city, resulting in the death of two civilians and the injury of several others.

On 27 August six members of the reconciled 5th Corps, including a commander, were killed in a Syrian army ambush at al-Ruba’i checkpoint between al-Msifrah and al-Jizah. Fierce fighting between gunmen and the Syrian army took place on the frontline of al-Kaziyah in al-Mansheya area in Daraa al-Balad shortly after.

Between 29 and 30 August seven Syrian soldiers were killed in clashes with insurgents along with 12 others wounded throughout Daraa province. These events come prior to Syrian army shelling on the besieged Daraa al-Balad, that left civilian casualties.

After the heavy bombardment, the insurgents agreed to a truce on 1 September, allowing for rebels to settle their status with the government. Russian military police and Syrian state forces entered the besieged Daraa al-Balad neighborhood, hoisting up the Syrian flag in the area. The truce was soon broken, with intense clashes reported on 5 September. The same day, the Russians threatened the insurgents that they would take part in a government offensive if they refused to surrender.

On 5 September, the insurgents agreed to another truce, with 60 militants handing over their weapons to the Syrian army. The new agreement allowed several pro-government checkpoints to be established in Daraa al-Balad.

== Reactions ==
Protests were held in support of the rebels in Daraa in the opposition-held cities of Idlib and al-Bab. On 3 August, the main road connecting Arbin, Mesraba and Madira, in the Ghouta region of Rif Dimashq was cut by rebel supporters for a day before the army was deployed to the region.

== See also ==
- March 2020 Daraa clashes
