= Southern Syria offensive (2024) =

Syrian civil war military operation

- Part of the 2024 Syrian opposition offensive and the Daraa Governorate campaign during the Syrian civil war
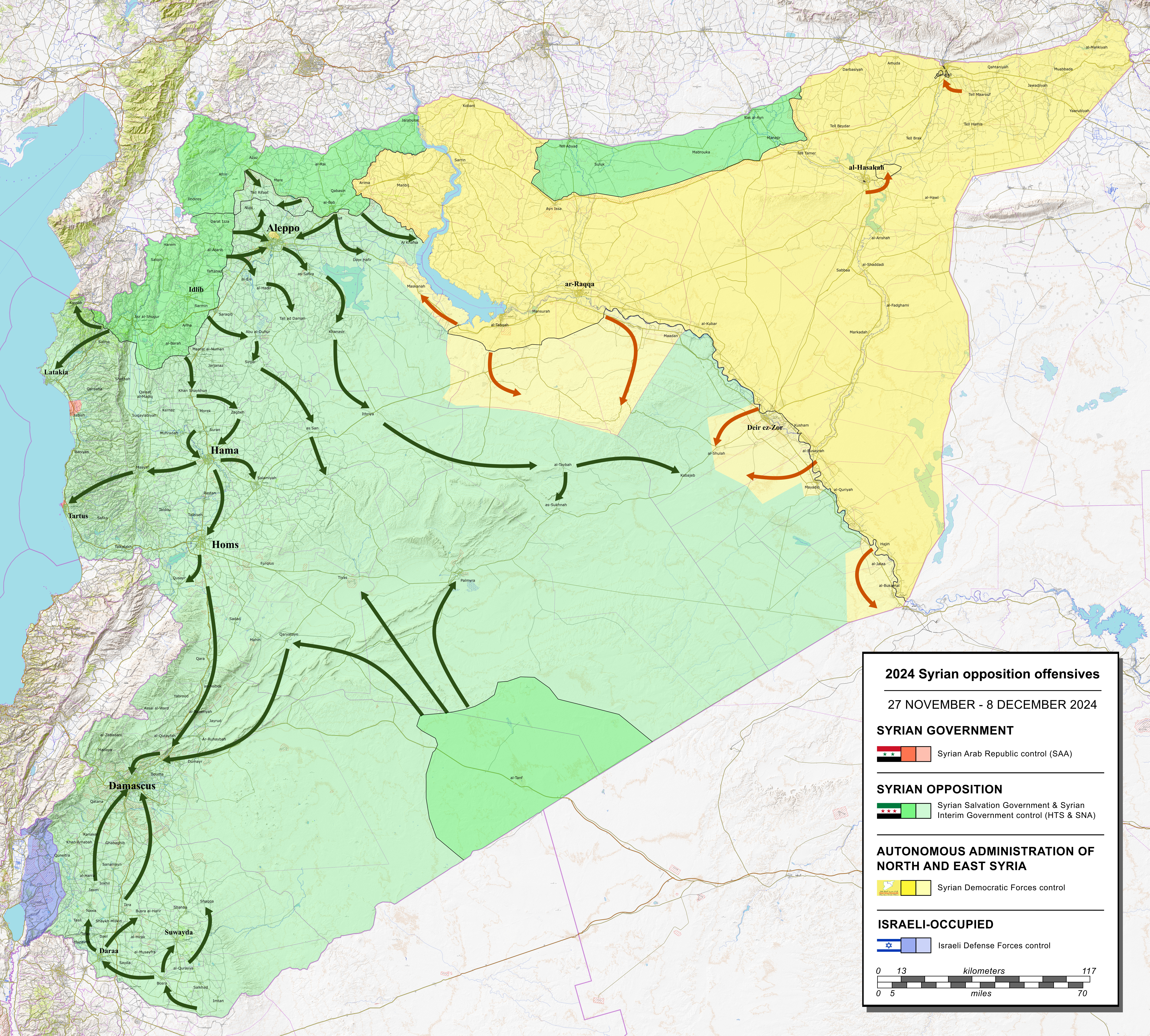
- Map of Southern Syria including Daraa; Controlled by the Syrian Arab Republic; Controlled by the Southern Operations Room; Israeli-occupied Golan Heights
Date	29 November – 7 December 2024 (1 week and 1 day)
Location	Southern Syria: Daraa Governorate; Suwayda Governorate; Quneitra Governorate
Result	Syrian opposition victory: Pro-government forces withdraw to Damascus Governorate; A rebel Southern Operations Room for fighters from Daraa, Suwayda and Quneitra governorates is announced; Start of the fall of Damascus
Territorial changes	Rebels fully capture both the Daraa Governorate and Quneitra region

Belligerents
Syrian Opposition; (Syrian opposition) Southern Operations Room; (Syria) Decisive Battle Operations Room; Syrian Salvation Government	(Ba'athist Syria) Syrian Government (surrendered)

Commanders and leaders
Ahmad al-Awda (after 6 December)	Brig. Gen. Louay al-Ali; Ahmad al-Awda (until 6 December)

Units involved
(Syrian opposition) Southern Operations Room; (Syrian opposition) Eighth Brigade (from 6 December); (Syrian opposition) Central Committees; Al-Jabal Brigade; Sheikh al-Karama Forces; Men of Dignity; (Syria) Decisive Battle Operations Room; Al-Jabal Brigade; Men of Dignity; Sheikh al-Karama Forces; Faz‘at Shabab al-Jabal; Saraya al-Jabal; Tajammu‘ Abna’ al-Jabal; SSG; Hay'at Tahrir al-Sham	Syrian Armed Forces; 5th Assault Corps; Eighth Brigade (until 6 December)

Casualties and losses
(Syrian opposition) Local armed group commander killed, and another wounded	2 SAF first lieutenants killed 2 service members wounded
- 10 civilians killed (8 by Syrian Arab Army shelling)

Beginning on 29 November 2024, southern Syrian opposition groups began assaults on Daraa Governorate and As-Suwayda Governorate in Southern Syria, along the nation's border with Jordan. The offensive was publicly announced as an effort by the Southern Operations Room coordinated with the Northwestern Syria offensive to implement a multi-front advance toward Damascus. The Syrian Armed Forces withdrew from their positions around the city of Daraa to reinforce Damascus but offered no resistance there, and southern opposition groups took Damascus in the early hours of 8 December, shortly before the arrival of northern opposition groups later that day.

== Background ==
Since July 2018, Daraa had officially been under government control following a Russian-mediated settlement agreement. However, complete government authority in the region remained contested, particularly in Daraa al-Balad and western rural areas, where the 2021 Daraa offensive had taken place.

== Preparations ==
Following the onset of the Northwestern Syria offensive, Syrian rebel forces in the south of the nation released a public announcement attributed to the "Revolutionaries and Free Men of the Eastern Region of Hauran", declaring plans to coordinate military activities with northern opposition groups. The rebel groups intended to implement a pincer movement plan, specifically targeting Damascus with simultaneous pressure from both northern and southern opposition forces. The southern opposition movement, centered in Daraa province, established a coordinated military framework involving multiple factions. Local media outlet Daraa 24 reported plans for targeted operations against government military installations and checkpoints in the region.

Beginning on 29 November 2024, rebel groups commenced operations against Syrian government installations across the southern region, with particular focus on the Daraa and As-Suwayda governorates. These activities primarily targeted government security infrastructure, including military checkpoints and security apparatus positions. In Inkhil, north of Daraa, opposition forces besieged the State Security Center. Concurrent activity included a rocket attack targeting the Air Force Intelligence facility in Suwayda.

According to the Syrian Observatory for Human Rights (SOHR), unidentified combatants fired upon loyalist Syrian Armed Forces (SAF) military personnel near Om Shama Town in the eastern region of Suwayda Governorate, resulting in the death of an SAF first lieutenant from Tartus and the wounding of two additional service members. On 30 November, another SAF first lieutenant and three Bedouin tribe members were shot to death by opposing combatants, according to SOHR. SOHR also said a local armed group commander was killed by gunfire in Tafas in western Daraa, while another was wounded.

On 30 November 2024, the Syrian Armed Forces implemented a significant military deployment to Daraa, a strategic city in southern Syria. Military leadership confirmed the deployment as part of ongoing national security operations, specifically aimed at addressing concerns related to militant organizations operating within southern Syrian territories. The General Command of the Syrian Armed Forces issued a formal statement regarding the operation, and announced that the armed forces were executing counter-responses to combat "terrorist entities" in the region.

== Offensive ==
On 6 December 2024, several towns in Daraa Governorate, including Inkhil, al-Jbailiya, Ghabagheb, al-Jiza, al-Ghariyah al-Sharqiyah, Jasim, Namir, and Simlin, along with the Nasib Border Crossing, came under the control of local forces. Furthermore, more cities, including Busra al-Harir, Nawa, Mahajjah, as well as the entire Jordanian border region, fell completely under rebel control.

Rebels claimed to have taken control of Brigade 52, the second-largest government military base in Daraa province, after exchanging fire with regime forces in the base and the nearby town of al-Hirak. By the end of the day, rebels managed to entirely secure the city of Daraa in addition to Izra for the first time since the start of the civil war.

In Suwayda, protesters managed to fully control the city by securing security and military sites, including the central prison, headquarters of the Baath Party branch, police headquarters, and many military checkpoints. That same day, four civilians were killed in separate incidents.

By the beginning of 7 December, rebels had captured 90% of Daraa Governorate, with the exception of Sanamayn, and granted safe passage to pro-government forces towards Damascus. Later that morning, rebels also seized Quneitra Governorate after pro-government forces withdrew towards Damascus. That day, the Israeli army helped the UNDOF repel an attack.

A HTS commander stated his forces were less than 20 kilometers away from the southern gate of Damascus after capturing Al-Sanamayn. Syrian state media reported ballistic missile launches from Damascus towards Daraa.

On 7 December 2024, six civilians were killed by SAA shelling in Daraa.

== Aftermath ==
In the wake of the fall of Damascus on 8 December, the Israel Defense Forces (IDF) created a buffer zone with additional military presence in the Golan Heights, for the first time since 1974. The IDF took positions on the Syrian side of Mount Hermon as well.

On 11 December, HTS leader Ahmed al-Sharaa met with rebels who took part in the Southern Syria offensive.

== Reactions ==
- Jordan closed the Nasib Border Crossing in response to the military escalation in southern Syria.
- Israel reinforced Division 201 and deployed additional troops to the Golan Heights.
- Former Daraa Omari Mosque preacher and religious leader Sheikh Ahmed Al-Sayasneh endorsed the opposition's military campaign as a necessary response to actions by government forces and Iranian-affiliated militias.

== See also ==
- 2024 Syrian opposition offensives
  - Deir ez-Zor offensive (2024)
  - Palmyra offensive (2024)
