= Daraa insurgency =

2018–2021 insurgency in Daraa Governorate, Syria

Insurgency in Daraa
- Part of Daraa Governorate campaign of the Syrian civil war
Date	23 November 2018 – 5 September 2021 (2 years, 9 months, 1 week and 6 days)
Location	the Daraa Governorate and Quneitra Governorate, Syria
Status	Syrian government victory
Territorial changes	Russian military police and Syrian state security entered Daraa al-Balad; Syrian and Russian flags were raised in the neighborhood; Low level insurgency continued

Belligerents
Syrian Opposition loyalists Ex-rebels in reconciliation zones Supported by: 5th Corps' 8th Brigade 5th Corps' 8th Brigade (Occasional clashes)	(Syria) Syrian Arab Republic

Commanders and leaders
Walid al-Zahra † (leader of Thuwar al-Sanamayn); Muhammad Qasim al-Subaihi	Maj. Gen. Maher al-Assad (head of the 4th Division); Maj. Gen. Hossam Louka; Brig. Gen. Louay al-Ali; Brig. Gen. Hamed Makhlouf †; Col. Mahmoud Habib †

Units involved
(Syria) Popular Resistance (2018–2020); (Syrian opposition) Southern Brigades (2019); (Syrian opposition) Thuwar al-Sanamayn (2020)	Syrian Armed Forces; Syrian Arab Army; 9th Armoured Division; 52nd Mechanized Brigade; 4th Armoured Division; 5th Armoured Division; 15th Special Forces Division; National Defense Forces; Air Force Intelligence Directorate; Military Intelligence Directorate; Reconciled rebels working with the government

Casualties and losses
22+ 40 (Fifth Corps)	567 killed (since early June 2019): 389 government soldiers; 151 reconciled rebels; 27 Syrians affiliated with Hezbollah or Iran-backed groups
- 259 civilians killed (since early June 2019); Total: 888+ killed (since early June 2019)

The Daraa insurgency was a conflict waged against the Syrian government and allies by various anti-government forces in Daraa Governorate as part of the Syrian civil war. Insurgent activity began in late 2018, but drastically increased the following year. Over 1,200 attacks occurred in the year after June 2019, when the insurgency intensified. Tensions between reconciled rebels and the Syrian government would lead to heavy armed clashes between the two sides in 2020 and 2021. The conflict ended with the victory of government forces in 2021.

== Background ==
Map of reconciliation areas in Daraa governorate, from July 2018-late February 2020

Following the 2018 offensive that brought Daraa and Quneitra under control of the Syrian Arab Army, many rebels forces in the area agreed to Russian-brokered reconciliation deals, in which they laid down their weapons against the Syrian Army. The rebels also handed over their heavy weapons. Most rebels stayed behind, and controlled various areas in the province, as well as the Daraa al-Balad subdistrict of the city of Daraa. Those who didn't agree to the terms were sent to rebel held areas in Idlib Governorate by bus, with evacuations taking place in Nawa, as well as Daraa, in what came to be known as the "green buses." However, due to several factors, Daraa became unstable following the conflict. Tensions arose between the Syrian government and the reconciled rebels. Conditions in the province were lackluster. Most people in Daraa live below the poverty line, the poor financial situation has led to high unemployment, especially among youth. Basic services are in terrible condition, due in part to damage from fighting. Economic downturn and lack of security gave rise to crime and tribal justice, fueling the security chaos. The presence of foreign groups such as Hezbollah increased these tensions. In addition, forced conscription and arrests fueled anger against the Syrian government.

== Factions ==
The Popular Resistance was the largest of the opposition groups in Daraa. It was created in 2018, but began extensive operations in 2019. They usually carry out attacks on Syrian Army positions, intelligence agencies, and former rebels and commanders working for the government. The soldiers of former rebel factions which operated with Daraa are present in several towns and cities in the province, and have clashed with government forces on several occasions during military operations against their areas. The Islamic State was also present in Daraa, and had carried out attacks against the Syrian Army.

== Timeline ==
=== 2018 ===
Sporadic attacks occurred in the province following its return to government control.

==== September ====
- 27 September – Clashes with ISIS militants take place in the town of al-Hara in Northwest Daraa, the first of its kind since July.

==== November ====
- 23 November – A soldier in the Syrian Army was assassinated by unknown gunmen in the town of al-Allan.

==== December ====
- December – There is an increase in attacks on government forces and collaborators. Such actions included an attack on an army checkpoint in the eastern Karak area, and assassination of two reconciled commanders.

=== 2019 ===
==== January ====
Clashes took place on 11 January between the Syrian Army and former rebels in the town of Al-Sanamayn after an attempt was made to arrest a commander of the latter. Unknown gunmen shot a person in the same town the next day. On 16 January, A former fighter was shot in Tariq al-Sadd. The head of al-Msifira township was assassinated. On 21 January, a former rebel commander's house was attacked by men with grenades and small arms. On 31 January, several explosions were heard as gunmen attacked Nahteh checkpoint, one of the largest checkpoints in the countryside, with shells and machine guns, causing Syrian soldiers to withdraw to rear positions.

==== February ====
On 4 February, several gunmen attacked an Air Force Intelligence HQ in the town of Da’el. The next day, an opposition group known as the Popular Resistance called on young men to join it in response to government recruitment campaigns, putting the authorities on high alert. On 6 February the Popular Resistance group carried out its first attack of the month, blowing up a checkpoint and killing at least three soldiers. On 14 February, the Popular Resistance assassinated a military intelligence officer in al-Yabudeh. The following day, a reconciliation faction leader was assassinated. On 16 February, between the towns of Sanamayn and Qita, a bus and car were attacked, leading to the deaths of seven soldiers. 18 February – In Sanamayn, the leader of the "People's Committee" was shot. The next day, a former rebel leader was fired upon in his car, wounding him. Gunmen tried unsuccessfully to kill the head of the Muzayrib municipality on the 20th.

On 25 February, a former judge was assassinated in the al-Yabudah court house. On the 28th, grenades were thrown at the cars of one of the godfathers in Al-Karak.

==== March ====
On 7 March, gunmen target a reconciled rebel loyal to security forces, injuring him. Two days later, the Sanamayn city council President's car was targeted with a grenade, injuring his daughter. Threats were sent to Ba'ath party officials in the province by Popular Resistance and the "Southern Brigades," another group which emerged in Daraa, on 10 March. The Southern Brigades had reportedly carried out an attack on the Ba'ath Party headquarters in Umm Walad back in February. Demonstrations in Daraa al-Balad took place after a statue of former president Hafez al-Assad was erected in the city, causing anger among the populace. They lasted several days, and demonstrations in other towns such as Tafas. Meanwhile, Popular Resistance attacked an Air Force Intelligence detachment in Al-Mulayha Al-Sharkiyya, killing the chief of the detachment. Multiple attacks took place on a detachment in the town of Da'el with medium weapons and grenades took place on several different days. A relief official affiliated with reconciliation settlements was kidnapped on 30 March. On 31 March, gunmen attacked an army checkpoint in Daraa al-Balad, leading to casualties. The same day, clashes took place between the 5th corps and members of an Air Intelligence checkpoint due to abuses of the latter.

==== April ====
On 2 April, gunmen opened fire on a car carrying two reconciled commanders in Bosra al-Harir, injuring one of them severely, while in the town of Sanamayn, a grenade was thrown at a former rebel's house. Attacks took place the next day, when an IED went off in the town of al-Suwar. The same day, a military security member was killed on the road to Khrab al-Shahem. Another was targeted on the same road, with him being injured and his grandson killed. An assassination attempt on a man working with Hezbollah also took place that day. Gunmen attacked an Air Intelligence checkpoint west of Karak on 5 April, and on the 6th, an Air intelligence HQ in al-Msifra town was shot at, leading for government forces to fortify their checkpoints. More attack occurred five days later, when, a mosque preacher was assassinated in al-Hrak and the Ba'ath party building in Daraa al-Mahatta, causing material damage. On 20 April, the car of a Ba'ath party official in Sanamayn was damaged by gunfire. On 21 April the Popular Resistance killed an individual in connection with Air Intelligence, and a former fighter was killed the next day.

On 24 April, Popular Resistance carried out a series of attacks on Syrian army checkpoints in the town of Sanamayn, and assassinated a reconciled commander in Muzayrib. Two dead bodies were found on the outskirts, though they could not be identified. An attack by unknown gunmen took place in another part of the province when doctor and his family were attacked at his home, injuring him and his family. five days later Popular Resistance killed a member of Air Intelligence on the road to Adwan town, and a reconciled fighter on the 30th.

==== May ====
On 3 May, the Popular Resistance killed a reconciled fighter, and on the 9th, assassinated the commander of the free Syrian Police in the Al-Balad neighborhood, after he reconciled with the government. Further attacks continued on the 23rd, when a former fighter was assassinated in the outskirts of Muzayrib town. The same day, after the arrest of a former commander who joined the Fourth division, other reconciled fighters took over two checkpoints, but withdrew after the commander was released. The Popular Resistance killed a soldier of the Fourth Division three days later in Daraa al-Balad. On the 29th, a former ISIS fighter was assassinated in Tafas, and a day later, in Jasim, two army soldiers were shot and injured after the molestation of two girls in the town.

===== Siege of al-Sanamayn =====
On 15 May, the government Criminal Security raided the home of Walid al-Zahra, leader of a rebel group active in the town, to arrest him. His brother and two others were taken. Clashes broke out, and 2 patrol members were killed in the clashes. Following this, the town was put under siege, and movement of people and goods was halted. Further clashes took place on 19 May as Popular Resistance carried out attacks on the Security Box in the town. A civilian was killed after being caught in the crossfire. The next day, reinforcements were brought to the area. On the 22nd, the Central Committee and government forces began negotiations with the government. The Central Negotiations Committee was created by reconciled rebels after the 2018 offensive to negotiate with the Syrian government. After a dignitary meeting with Russian forces, the siege of the town was finally lifted on the 23rd.

==== June ====
Popular Resistance intensified its attacks on government forces and supposed collaborators. The Ba'ath Party building in Om Walad village was attacked. Popular Resistance shot a former Ahrar al-Sham commander near Saham al-Goulan. In the town of Nawa, Popular Resistance assassinated Khaled Abu Rukba in front of his house. He was a member of the Central Negotiations Committee, and had joined air intelligence. A soldier was also killed by unknown gunmen in Tafas. Popular Resistance assassinated Abu al-Majd, who was part of an Iranian-affiliated office promoting Shi'ism. A Shia Muslim living in Tafas was killed by known gunmen. During the night of 12 June, Popular Resistance attacked an air intelligence checkpoint on the road between Nahte and Busra al-Harir, killing or injuring all the soldiers. In the Quneitra countryside, a former commander who joined government forces was killed and his brother injured following an attack. More attacks by Popular Resistance and other groups took place in Da'el, Jasim, Nawa, and al-Hirak.

==== July ====
On 3 July the first insurgent attack of the month occurred when a soldier of the Fourth division was killed. Two days later an air intelligence checkpoint in Om Walad village was attacked leading to casualties, and two members of air intelligence who were formerly fighters were found dead in the outskirts of al-Shammari. Following more assassinations, a Russian patrol was attacked with an IED. More assassinations and attacks on checkpoints occurred in Mukhtar of Al-Yadudah, Nawa, and other towns. Popular Resistance attacked the Fourth division's Zayzoun Camp with RPGs and machine guns, leading to injuries. Another bombing took place on 17 July, when an IED blew up a military bus travelling between Al-Dahiya neighborhood and Al-Yadudah town, killing and injuring multiple soldiers. The same day near Sheikh Saad, gunmen opened fire on a car, killing a colonel along with his wife and son. A lieutenant and member of the 5th corps would be targeted in the coming days. On 27 July, a suicide bomber detonated a booby trapped car at an air intelligence checkpoint between Al-Harak city and Mulayha al-Atash, killing six soldiers. The same day, hours later, the head of the Ba'ath party branch in Jasim was assassinated. Over the next three days, several attacks were carried out against checkpoints in al-Sanamayn, between Al-Jibayliyah and Ghadir Al-Bustan.

==== August ====
Attacks against the Syrian army continued. Clashes took place for hours in the northern areas of al-Sanamayn in the second of August between the Syrian army and gunmen in the north of the city. A number of attacks took place on 8 August. Popular Resistance attacked a military checkpoint in the town of Tasil, two reconciled rebels in the Fourth division were assassinated in Daraa al-Balad, and a member of the republican guard was assassinated in the town of Tel Shihab. Another Republican Guard member was assassinated two days later. A RPG attack in Tafas left several members of a family injured. On the 11th, soldiers on the road to the Jasim hospital were the target of an IED attack, with several injuries reported. In addition, a border guard was killed and another injured when they were attacked by gunmen near Nasib town. The next day, a soldier was assassinated in Sheik Saad. The next attack took place four days later, when two Fourth Division soldiers were killed in the town of Nahj. On the 17th, an Iman who reportedly was a government agent was assassinated in the town of Alam. The municipality chairman of al-Shajrawas targeted two days later, leaving him seriously injured.

It was reported that the Syrian Army reinforced positions and threatened to storm the town of Tafas, blaming the rebels there for the security escalations in the province. Discussions took place between a former opposition commander in the town and the intelligence services. On the 20th, a man working with the security agencies was killed in Nateh. A man working closely with Hezbollah was killed on the 23rd. On the 24th, the chief of the local council in the town of Muzayrib was killed. Unidentified men kidnapped a photographer of a pro-government agency, he was found later with bruises. On the 28th, a Fourth Division soldier was killed in al-Yadudah. On the same day, gunmen carried out an attack on a military checkpoint south of Inkhil, injuring two soldiers.

On the 29th, a person collaborating with the government in the reconciliation area of Nab’ Al-Fawwar village was killed. The same day, three police officers in the town of Masakin Jalin were killed after gunmen opened fire on their car. On 31 August, a minibus belonging to air intelligence was blown up with an IED on the road between western al-Gharya and eastern Karak in the eastern countryside, injuring over 15–17 security officers.

==== September ====
On the 1st, gunmen opened fire on the head of the Al-Shajarah municipality, but failed to injure him. He was known for his strong ties to the security agencies and Iranian groups and had been targeted before. On 3 September, unknown gunmen shot and seriously injured a former ISIS fighter working with air intelligence and branch 215 in front of his home in Nawa. On 4 September, an ex-rebel working in military security was assassinated in the town of Om Batnah, in the Quneitra countryside. The same day, an IED was detonated in Zayzoun Camp, where units of the Fourth Division were positioned, injuring a colonel and four soldiers. On 9 September, it was announced that the head of the Air Intelligence branch in Daraa died in his home "under mysterious circumstances." On the 12th, a former opposition leader and reconciliation icon was targeted with an IED, but his condition was unknown. Gunmen carried out an attack in the town of Da'el, killing a member of the Command of the Ba'ath party's Yarmouk branch. On the 17th, unknown gunmen assassinated a Hezbollah fighter and his brother in the town of al-Harak. A bus was blown up in the al-Meftrah area, and two men died from their injuries days later. The next day, a soldier in the 5th corps was assassinated in Daraa al-Balad.

On the 19th, gunmen seriously injured someone working with government security services near al-Amal Hospital in Jasim. On the 20th, gunmen attacked a pro-government militia in Sanamayn, killing an ex-rebel, and an IED blew up a convoy of the 52nd brigade travelling between al-Darah and Skaka. On 22 September, an IED blew up a car travelling between Izra and Bosra al-Harir, injuring a colonel of the 5th division. The next day a security agent was shot in the northern countryside of Daraa, and died later of his injuries. On the 24th, a man working with the security agencies was assassinated in Tel Shihab, and an IED blew up in front of a house in Daraa al-Balad. On 25 September, clashes took place for hours when gunmen attacked the military headquarters of the NDF and Military Security in Sanamayn. One soldier was killed and several others were injured before the attackers fled. The same day. the Mukhtar of Al-Mulayha al-Sharkiyya, known to work with intelligence agencies, was killed in front of his home by unknown gunmen. Unidentified gunmen assassinated a citizen in the Al-Jam’eyya neighborhood of Sanamayn over personal problems. In Tafas, an ex-rebel who joined Air Intelligence was assassinated on the 28th. On 30 September, two gunmen opened fire on a citizen and injured them seriously in the town of Abtaa. An ex-rebel commander who became a commander in the 5th corps was seriously injured in the Yarmouk Basin near Sahem al-Golan, and a rocket launched by government forces to the south of Daraa city landed in a neighborhood of Daraa al-Balad.

==== October ====
On 1 October, gunmen attacked a house in the Yarmouk Basin, damaging it. An air intelligence officer was assassinated in Daraa al-Balad. On the 2nd, a recruiter for Hezbollah was found dead in Daraa al-Balad. An informant working for the government was targeted in the town of Sayda on 4 October, and injured in the attack. A soldier of the Syrian Army reserves was found dead near Bosra al-Harir the same day. Three attacks took place on the 6th. An ex-commander was assassinated on the road between Al-Taybah and Kahil, and a member of a municipality was injured after being shot in Nahteh. Two soldiers of the Fourth Division were assassinated in Tel Shihab. Another municipality member was injured on 7 October in the town of al-Yadudeh. On the 11th, unknown rebels targeted a Russian military patrol with an IED on the road between Jasim and Inkhil, causing injuries among the Russian police. A Syrian lieutenant officer escorting the Russian police column died from his injuries days later. Another bomb went off on the same road targeting a car carrying government forces, injuring several of them. Three ex-rebels who joined military security were assassinated in the town of Tafas. On the 12th, an ex-rebel who joined government forces was found dead near the town of Tal Samn.

==== November ====
On 5 November a member of the Russian backed 5 Corp was killed by an unknown attacker. On 5 November a former fighter of the "free army" that stuck reconciliation with the Syrian army was kidnapped then killed by unknown gunmen. Also on the 5th an informant for Hezbollah was killed by two unidentified gunmen on a motorcycle. On 7 November a reconciled rebel fighter was assassinated by unknown gunmen. On 8 November an IED exploded in the town of Tasil near a former rebel leader's house, the explosion killed 1 unidentified person. A drug dealer was also assassinated by unknown gunmen in the town of al-Mzeireb on the 8th. On 11 November a body of a civilian was dumped near a government checkpoint in village of Qita. On the 12th fighters from the group “Popular Resistance in Daraa”, attacked a checkpoint of the military intelligence killing 3 and injuring an unknown number of others. On 12 November small scale protest against Hezbollah occurred in the towns of Tal Shehab, Al-Ajami and Zayzun. An assassination attempt failed in the city of Inkhil. on the 15th more protest occurred in the towns of Al-Balad and Sahem Al-Golan. On 16 November a series of attack took place, 2 house belonging to members of the military intelligence were targeted with RPGs, no one was injured. A security checkpoint near Al-Sahwa was also hit with RPGs injuring 1 person. Clashes broke out in the town of Al-Hara between the "Popular Resistance" and military forces, an unknown number of people were injured in the clashes. On the 17th a body of a woman was found in the town of Al-Sahari. On the 18th 3 young men were injured in the city of al-Sanamin by unknown gunmen. A child was killed by gunfire on the road between Al-Sanamayn and al-Qenniyye on the 19th. Also on the 19th a member of collaborator of Hezbollah was killed. On the 20th a drug smuggler was killed by unknown gunmen. On the 23rd 2 member of the special forces were killed by unknown gunmen on the road between Tafas and Al-Yadudah. Also of the 23rd protest broke out in the city of Nawa. two attacks took place on the 25th, a civilian was killed after being kidnapped and a reconciled rebel fighter was killed by unknown gunmen. three incidents took place on the 27th protests started in the town of al-Shajra, A former rebel leader was killed in Tafas, and a lieutenant of the “NDF” was killed by unknown gunmen. On the 29th two brothers that struck reconciliation were killed and thousands of people protest across Daraa province against the government.

==== December ====
On 1 December, unknown gunmen robbed a food aid compound belonging to the Syrian red crescent. On the 2nd multiple events happened. A former commander of the rebels survived an assassination attempt on his life, Gunmen robbed a jewelry store in Daraa city, a member of the “Military Security Intelligence Branch” was assassinated in Al-Sanamayn city. An IED killed a person in Jasim city, a member of the military was killed when their checkpoint was ambushed in al-Sanamin city, and a member of the 5th corp was seriously injured in an attack in Al-Jiza town. On the 3rd protests against government broke out in the town of Hyt. On the 4th, an IED targeting an officer in the military went off, injuring him seriously. On 5 December, a collaborator with the government was assassinated in the town of al-Msifra. On the 6th Armed gunmen attacked a checkpoint of the military, killing one member and injuring others. On the 7th, unknown gunmen armed with machine guns attacked a building of “Criminal Security” in Al-Sanamayn city. A fire fight then broke out between soldiers stationed inside and the gunmen, an Unknown number of people were injured or killed. On the 8th, a collaborator with Hezbollah was assassinated bu unknown gunmen. On the 9th gunmen attack the checkpoint of the Air Force Intelligence in Al-Karak Al-Sharqi town, an unknown of people were killed or injured, and a collaborator with the state security was assassinated in Jassim city. On the 10th the head of Al-Shajarah Municipality and a collaborator with the government was killed between Izraa and Al-Harrak, both were assassinated by unknown gunmen. On the 12th a former member of the rebels was assassinated in the town of Tafas. On 13 December, an attack on Syrian military forces by unidentified attacker using light and medium weapons as well as RPGs, an unknown number of people were injured. On the 14th an IED targeted a military vehicle of the “52nd Brigade” between Namir and Al-Surah leaving many injured. On the 15th a civilian was assassinated by unknown gunmen on the road between Nahteh and Bosr Al-Harir. Protests also broke out in Naf’aa town on the 15th. On 16 December, an unidentified man was found dead Atman town. On the 19th, a car was destroyed with an IED Jassim city, but no one was injured or killed. On the 20th protest against the government took place in the town of Al-Yadoda. On the 21st two members of the “4th Division” were assassinated by unknown gunmen on the road between Jassim and Salmin. On the 22nd a major attack took place 5 soldier of the 4th Division were killed by unidentified gunmen in an attack on their checkpoint in Sad Saham al-Golan. Another person was killed by unidentified gunmen in Bosr al-Harir town, and an unsuccessful assassination attempt on a member of the political security took place in Al-Sanamin city injuring him. A captain in Bosr Al-Harir town was killed on the 22nd.In total 7 people were killed on the 22nd. On the 23rd protests against the government took place in Tafas. On 24 December, multiple events took place, members of the military raided multiple houses in Sayda and Al-Gharya Al-Sharqiyah, they arrested multiple people and looted the buildings. An IED killed a former commander of the "Shabab Al-Sunnah" rebel faction in Daraa city. A former commander of the “Al-Omary Gathering” rebel faction was arrested by Hezbollah, and two officers of the government were kidnapped in the town of Yadudeh. On the 26th an IED damaged a bus belonging to the military on the road between Nawa city and Tasil town injuring many. On the 27th protest against the government actions in Idlib took place in the town of Nahta. On the 28th the body of a person from Tal Shihab town was found in Naseeb town. On the 29th, unknown gunmen opened fire from a vehicle at a group of civilian in Al-Sanamayn city, injuring three. On the 30th, an IED targeting a government post killed one government soldier and injured three more.

=== 2020 ===
==== January ====
On the 1st a machine gun attack took place, grenade was thrown at a checkpoint, and the municipality building of Mesika town was burned down. On the 2nd the Syrian reserve soldier was killed by unidentified gunmen on motorcycles. On the 3rd an IED attack targeting a former rebel commander took place in Al-Balad causing only material damage, a former rebel fighter was injured by unknown gunmen, unknown gunmen attack the military headquarter in al-Harak city, and a man was found dead on Khirbet al-Ghazali road. On the 4th unknown gunmen attack the Tafas military barracks and a civilian was injured in a machine gun attack in the town of Tal Shihab. On the 6th a drug dealer in the 4th division was assassinated in Al-Muzayrib town. On the 8th a commander of the 9th Division was attack in his car at Jbab village injuring his driver. On the 9th a former commander in “Shabab Al-Sunnah” rebel group executed three young men in Daraa city. On the 10th Unknown gunmen attack two checkpoints in al-Msifra and Eastern al-Gharya killing 3 and injuring 5, an assassination also took place in Amuriyyah village killing one. On the 12th two IEDs went off in Tafas city injuring one civilian and destroying a vehicle. On the 13th an unsuccessful assassination attempt took place in Al-Ghariya Al Sharqia town leave no one injured, but a successful assassination took place in Um al-Mayathen town killing one “Military Security" member. On the 15 a collaborator with Hezbollah was assassinated in Tasil town. On the 19th members of the 5th corp attacked the “Air Force Intelligence” headquarters in Da’el town several soldiers were injured, two members of the Airforce Intelligence were assassinated in Jassim town, and A doctor was killed in Bosr al-Harir town by an IED. Three attacks took place on the 21st the driver of a member of “People's Council of Syria” was assassinated on the road of Nimr – Jassim, a child was shot and killed in Jassim city, and unknown gunmen attacked Al-Souq checkpoint in Al-Sanamayn city with RPGs and machine guns. On the 22nd two soldier were abducted in al-Harak. On the 24th protests took place in Al-Harrak town and gunmen attacked a checkpoint of the “Air Force Intelligence" between Tasil and Adawan causing no casualties. On the 25th clashes between gunmen and police in the town of Abtaa injured many and a checkpoint belonging to the 112th Brigade was attack in Koya town. On the 26th a Jordanian civilian was found dead in Al-Harrak city after being kidnapped. On the 28th gunmen attacked the house of a commander in the 5th corp in Sayda town and an IED destroyed a vehicle in the town of Da’el. On the 29th unknown gunmen attacked a group of the “fourth division” soldiers in the town of Saham al-Golan. On the 30th A vehicle of the 4th division was destroyed with an IED in Al-Yadouda town, a member of the State Security was injured by gunfire in Jassim town, and clashes between the 4th division and the civilians of al-Sanamin took place after a member of the 4th division shot a young man. On the 31st a checkpoint was attack in al-Karak al-Sharqi, a Military Security member was attacked with an IED, and in Al-Gharia al-Sharqiya town gunmen opened fire on the mayor of the town's house. None of these events caused any casualties.

==== February ====
Three assassinations took place on 2 February. A doctor and another civilian were killed in Tafas, while an ex-rebel was killed in the town of al-Shajarah. On the 3rd, an ex-rebel was assassinated in Daraa al-Balad, while unknown gunmen attempted to assassinate a farmer in Muzayrib. On 4 February, a soldier of the 4th Division was assassinated in the al-Rayy area, between Yaboudeh and Muzayrib. The same day, a civilian was assassinated by unknown gunmen in Muzayrib, while gunmen in Sanamayn attacked a pro-government fighter by shooting into his home. On the 7th, a soldier was shot in Yaboudeh town, with a civilian and child killed by stray bullets. On the 9th, a young man was found with his neck broken behind his house in Sanamayn, while a soldier of the 4th division was found dead in al Sha'ari area.

==== March ====
Heavy fighting broke out on 1 March after the start of a government security operation against FSA insurgent cells in Al-Sanamayn and other areas in the Daraa governorate. Government forces stormed Al-Sanamayn with tanks and artillery support; seven rebels were killed, including the local insurgent commander Walid al-Zahraa. The assault on the town prompted insurgents in the rest of Daraa to launch attacks on government positions throughout the governorate, killing around four soldiers. Seven civilians were killed in the government bombardment and subsequent clashes. After Russian mediation ended the fighting on 3 March 80 rebels handed in their weapons and settled their status, 25 were evacuated to Tafas, and 21 were evacuated to Al-Bab; in turn, 52 soldiers captured by rebels were released.

=== 2021 ===
==== January–March ====
On 13 January, there were clashes in Tafas in the western Daraa countryside, between the rival Zoubi and Kiwan clans, leading to the deaths of four people from both sides.

On 23 January, government 4th Division fighters launched a new offensive in the western countryside of Daraa, targeting the towns of Tafas, Muzayrib and Al-Yadudah. On 24 January, the Syrian Observatory for Human Rights (SOHR) reported that negotiations broke down between pro-government forces and rebel factions (in particular Fajr al-Islam and the Central Committee), resulting in clashes in the cities of Tafas and Muzayrib. Several rebel fighters were killed and at least 4 members of the 4th Division were confirmed to have died, according to the Syrian Observatory. Rebels attacked 4th Armoured Division checkpoints north of Saham al-Jawlan in the Daraa countryside and on the Nafia-al-Shajara road in the Yarmouk Basin.

On 1 March, the SOHR reported that one Syrian government soldier was killed and 2 were wounded after an armed attack on an air-force intelligence outpost in the eastern Daraa countryside. On 9 March, the SOHR reported the death of a Syrian Army lieutenant of the 4th Division after he was targeted by unknown gunmen in the western Daraa country. Three Syrian Army soldiers were killed and at least 10 were wounded after clashes erupted on the Idlib front, after militants began to heavily shell Syrian army positions, according to SOHR.

On 18 March, hundreds gathered in the city of Daraa to mark the tenth anniversary of the beginning of the civil war that started as the anti-government demonstrations. Protesters chanted slogans against the government of President Bashar al-Assad.

On 19 March, two Syrian government soldiers were killed by unknown gunmen is the centre of Daraa city.

On 29 March, the SOHR reported the deaths of two brothers, both members of the SAA's 4th Division, after gunmen targeted them on the road to Al-Ajami in the western countryside of Daraa.

==== April–June ====
On 12 April, the SOHR reported that a member of the Syrian army's 4th division was shot and killed by unknown gunmen in the town of Al-Muzayrib in the western countryside of Daraa.

On 22 April, according to SOHR, a Syrian Air Force intelligence lieutenant was shot dead in the city of Dael, Daraa. Two members of the 4th Division were also shot dead by gunmen on a motorcycle on the road between Al-Muzayrib and Tel-Shehab. On 24 April, the SOHR reported that a Syrian Air-force intelligence member was killed and another was wounded after they were targeted by gunmen in the Al-Sahaw area of the eastern countryside of Daraa.

On 9 May, SOHR reported, a member of the Syrian Fourth Division was shot dead by unidentified gunmen, in the town of Tel Shehab, near the Syrian-Jordanian border, west of Daraa. On 15 May, SOHR reported, three government soldiers of the 112th Army Brigade were killed and two others were wounded after unknown gunmen targeted their vehicle in the town of Ain Zikr, Daraa province. On 19 May, a reconciled rebel who joined the 4th Division was shot dead by unidentified gunmen near the town of Tasil, western Daraa.

On 16 June, according to the SOHR, two government soldiers were killed and two others were wounded after they stepped on a landmine near Deir Adas town in northern Daraa. On 21 June, according to the SOHR an 'insane man' was shot dead by Syrian soldiers near a checkpoint in eastern Daraa.

==== July–September ====
On 4 July, the SOHR reported that a member of the Syrian Army's 5th Corps was shot dead, and another was wounded, by unknown gunmen in Ankhel city, Daraa. On 7 July, according to SOHR, at least four government soldiers (including a first lieutenant) were killed by an IED explosion near Nafaa village in the western countryside of Daraa.

At the end July 2021, government forces started a siege on Daraa, which led to clashes breaking out across the Western part of the Daraa Governorate. On the same day, the Syrian military launched a major attack on Daraa, killing at least six people. The offensive intensified the following day.

After heavy shelling, the rebels agreed to a truce on 1 September, allowing Russian military police and Syrian state security to enter the Daraa al-Balad neighborhood. As the agreement was reached, the Russian military police were deployed in the city, according to the Arab News. According to the ceasefire deal, none of the residents would be ejected from the area, while the pro-government forces, including its military security branch, would be based at four places in the region.

Some clashes took place soon thereafter, with the Russians threatening the insurgents to take part in a full SAA offensive if there were further problems. On 6 September, a final truce was agreed on, with several government checkpoints being established inside Daraa al-Balad.

On 5 September, SOHR reported that two members of the Syrian Army's intelligence service had been assassinated in Da’el city, Daraa province.

Following this deal, several other towns in the western Daraa countryside that had no SAA presence acquiesced to government demands, with Syrian state security and Russian military police entering the rest of western Daraa throughout September.

On 29 September, SOHR reported that a local leader of the 4th Division was shot dead by gunmen in Taseel town, west of Daraa.

==== October–December ====
On 6 October, two SAA lieutenants were killed by unknown gunmen in Daraa province.

By 9 October, villages from eastern Daraa began signing agreements with the government, with state forces entering the towns and conducting combing operations.

On 16 October, per SOHR, a member of the Syrian Army's 5th Corps was killed and another was injured after unknown gunmen opened fire on their positions in Sayda town in the eastern countryside of Daraa.

On 2 November, the SOHR reported that a member of the Syrian army's 4th Division was shot dead by unknown gunmen in the western countryside of Daraa. On 7 November, five government soldiers were killed in a series of separate attacks by insurgent gunmen in the province of Daraa, according to SOHR. On 9 November, a reconciled rebel who had been working with Syrian Military Intelligence was shot dead by unknown gunmen in Al-Sanamayn city, Daraa. On 13 November, according to SOHR, a member of the Ba'ath Party, two members of Syrian military security and a child were killed in an attack by unknown gunmen in Al-Sanamayn city, Daraa. On 17 November, per SOHR, a first lieutenant of the Syrian Arab Army was shot dead by unknown gunmen on the road between Da’el city and Abtaa town in the countryside of Daraa. On 24 November four reconciled rebels were killed during a clash with government forces as they were besieged in their farm houses near the town of Nahta Sharqiya for not complying with the government-rebel agreements in Daraa.

== See also ==
- Eastern Syria insurgency
- Insurgency in Idlib
- SDF insurgency in Northern Aleppo
- Syrian Desert campaign (December 2017–present)
