= Abu Murshed =

- Born: Mahmoud Abdelqader
- Military career
- Allegiance: Syrian opposition (2016‍–‍2018, 2024); Ba'athist Syria (2018–2024); Syria (2025–present)
- Branch: (Syrian opposition) Free Syrian Army (2014–2018); 5th Assault Corps (2018–2024); (Syrian opposition) Southern Operations Room (2024‍–‍present)
- Nicknames: Abu Murshed; Mahmoud al-Bardan
- Unit: Army of the Revolution (2016–2018)
- Conflicts: Syrian civil war

Mahmoud Abdelqader, known as Mahmoud al-Bardan and commonly known by his nom de guerre Abu Murshed, was a leader of the Army of the Revolution in Syria and is part of the Central Committees in Western Daraa as well as a high-ranking member of the Southern Operations Room.

== Life ==
Abu Murshed is a native of Tafas who served as a "commander" in the Army of the Revolution and worked closely with the Jordanian Military Operations Center.

He had accepted the Russian-brokered reconciliation deal with the Assad regime and became a negotiator in the Daraa Central Committee. He also became a commander in the 5th Legion. He later became affiliated with the Military Intelligence Directorate. He and other former rebels formed vigilante groups targeting those in the drug trade; they worked with Hay'at Tahrir al-Sham as well as the Eighth Brigade. Other vigilante groups worked directly with Military Security.

Abu Murshed was one of the targets in an assassination attempt which took place on 14 February 2019, which led to the death of his "squire" and the injury of another person. The following year, on 27 May, Abu Murshed was wounded in a second attempt, while Adnan al-Shambour, Rafat al-Barazi and Udai al-Hashish, who were also members of the Central Committees, were killed in the ambush, which took place between Ajami and Muzayrib. Abu Murshed, in February 2022, blamed the Islamic State of Iraq and Syria for the deaths of various members of the Central Committees.

Abu Murshed became a "deputy commander" in the Southern Operations Room.

He was among the leaders of local armed groups who met with the Syrian Ministry of Defense in February 2025 in Tafas.
