= Battle of Bosra (2015) =

Rebel operation in the Syrian Civil War

Coordinates: 32.5181°N 36.4817°E

- Part of the Syrian Civil War
- Map showing the rebel offensive to seize Bosra
Date	21–25 March 2015 (4 days)
Location	Bosra, Daraa Governorate, Syria
Result	Rebel victory
Territorial changes	Rebels capture Bosra

Belligerents
Free Syrian Army; Al-Nusra Front; Islamic Muthanna Movement	(Syria) Syrian Arab Republic: Syrian Arab Army; National Defense Force Hezbollah Lions of Hussein Iranian IRGC Imam Ali Brigades

Commanders and leaders
Gen. Bashar al-Zoubi (Southern Front leader); Ahmad al-Awda (Youth of Sunna Forces leader)	(Syria) Issam Zahreddine; Abu Kadhim Khudr † (Imam Ali Brigades commander)

Units involved
Southern Front: Youth of Sunna Forces; Yarmouk Brigade; Omari Brigades; Lions of Sunna Brigade	(Syria) 52nd Brigade (Syria) 17th Brigade

Casualties and losses
21–25 killed	Unknown
- 4 civilians killed

The Battle of Bosra refers to a military operation launched by Syrian rebels during the Syrian Civil War, which successfully captured the city of Bosra.

== The battle ==
On 21 March 2015, the offensive was launched by rebels on Syrian Army positions in and around Bosra. According to an opposition activist from Daraa, 10,000 rebels were involved in the battle.

On 24 March 2015, rebels advanced in the town and besieged a number of soldiers in the ancient citadel, which the Army relieved after a counterattack. The Syrian Air Force launched 10 airstrikes on the town, while 30 barrel bombs were also dropped that day. The Army also fired rockets on the nearby Maaraba hospital, where injured rebels were being treated, which completely levelled the building.

On 25 March 2015, FSA rebels backed by Islamist factions captured the town and its UNESCO archaeological sites. According to a pro-government source, Army and militia units retreated from their positions in the town after the promised reinforcements were not deployed.

== Aftermath ==
On 29 March, local clashes took place in Glen town in the Daraa countryside between the Islamic Muthanna Movement and the Lions of Sunna Brigade after an "argument" occurred about dividing the seized weapons and ammunition in Bosra. One fighter from the Islamic Muthanna Movement was killed, while three fighters were injured from both sides in the clashes. Ahmad al-Awda turned against Al-Nusra and the Islamic Muthanna Movement and "expelled" them from the city.
