= Bilal al-Droubi =

Syrian FSA commander (died 2025)

- بلال الدروبي
- Born: Bilal al-Masatafa al-Miqdad; Bosra, Ba'athist Syria
- Died: 12 April 2025; Daraa, Syria
- Military career
- Allegiance: Syrian opposition (2014‍–‍2018, 2024); Ba'athist Syria (2018–2024); Syria (2025)
- Branch: (Syrian opposition) Free Syrian Army (2014–2018); 5th Assault Corps (2018–2024); (Syrian opposition) Southern Operations Room (2024‍–‍2025); (Syria) Ministry of Defense (2025)
- Nickname: Abu Yazan
- Unit: Youth of Sunna Forces (2014–2018) 8th Brigade (2018–2025)
- Conflicts: Syrian civil war; Daraa Governorate campaign

Bilal al-Masatafa al-Miqdad (Arabic: بلال المصاطفة المقداد; died 12 April 2025), also nicknamed Bilal al-Droubi (Arabic: بلال الدروبي) and Abu Yazan (Arabic: أبو يزن), was a Syrian rebel commander who served as a member of the Youth of Sunna Forces and was appointed head of border security by the Syrian Ministry of Defense in 2025. His killing by members of the Eighth Brigade led to the dissolution of that faction in April 2025.

== Biography ==
Al-Droubi was born in Bosra al-Sham, Syria, into the large al-Mekdad clan, who are native to the city.

On 16 August 2016, the brother and father of Youth of Sunna Forces member Mohammed Tohme (an ally of al-Droubi) were attacked in their home by members of the faction, with his father beaten and his brother shot, leaving his brother in "critical condition." Tohme's supporters forcibly took control of the group's headquarters in Bosra. Tohme briefly took control of the faction, with al-Droubi as his deputy, supported by the group's leadership council. His leadership position did not last, however, as Ahmad al-Awda regained control of the group that same month with the support of the Yarmouk Army.

In the Russian-brokered settlement agreements in July 2018 after the Assad regime recaptured Daraa governorate, al-Awda allowed al-Droubi to form a military group under the Eighth Brigade's authority in Bosra. After the Assad regime fell, al-Droubi intended to form a group separate from the Eighth Brigade, but al-Awda did not allow him to do so, which reignited tensions between the two.

Al-Droubi became affiliated with the Syrian Ministry of Defense in 2025 and was appointed by the Syrian government as head of border security. He attempted to recruit members of the Eighth Brigade into the ministry of defense. His decisions angered Eighth Brigade leadership, viewing it as an attempt to "split ranks" and "undermine stability" in Bosra, as well as a "blatant encroachment" on the Eighth Brigade's influence in the city.

On 10 April 2025, while al-Droubi was driving with his wife and children, men affiliated with the Eighth Brigade confronted him on drug trafficking charges (which local sources said were false), detaining him and shooting him multiple times, seriously wounding him. Al-Droubi was hospitalised at Daraa National Hospital, and would die two days later, on the morning 12 April. In the wake of his death, pressure from the local public and Syrian authorities would lead to the dissolution of the Eighth Brigade a few days later in early April.

His funeral was held on 14 April at the Abu Bakr al-Siddiq Mosque Square in Bosra, which was attended by Daraa governor Anwar al-Zoubi along with other notables and local residents.
