= Syrian Revolution Victory Conference =

2025 Syrian conference after the fall of the Ba'athist-led regime

- Ahmed al-Sharaa, appointed President of Syria, addressing the conference
- Date: 29 January 2025; 18 months ago
- Location: People's Palace, Damascus, Syria
- Also known as: Conference for Announcing the Victory of the Syrian Revolution
- Organised by: Syrian caretaker government
- Participants: Ahmed al-Sharaa; President of Syria — Assuming office

The Syrian Revolution Victory Conference, officially titled the Conference for Announcing the Victory of the Syrian Revolution (Arabic: مؤتمر إعلان انتصار الثورة السورية), was held at the People's Palace, Damascus, Syria, on 29 January 2025. It was attended by the commanders of various armed revolutionary factions that fought for the Syrian opposition coalition against the deposed Ba'athist-led regime of Bashar al-Assad, with the exception of the Syrian Democratic Forces, the Southern Operations Room, and groups from Suwayda.

It was organized by the Hay'at Tahrir al-Sham-led Syrian caretaker government, under Syria’s de facto leader Ahmed al-Sharaa, who served as General Commander and head of the New Syrian Administration. The meeting praised the successful Syrian Revolution which resulted in the fall of the Assad regime on 8 December 2024.

In the conference, Military Operations Command spokesman Hassan Abdul Ghani announced that al-Sharaa had been appointed the president of Syria for the transitional period and laid out the new government's priorities, most of which involved eliminating traces of the deposed Ba'athist regime and rebuilding Syrian institutions. After he was appointed president, al-Sharaa received congratulations from leaders of many countries and later formed the Syrian transitional government under a transitional constitution in March 2025.

== Background ==
On 8 December 2024, the Assad regime collapsed during a major offensive by opposition forces. The offensive was led by Hay'at Tahrir al-Sham (HTS) and supported mainly by the Syrian National Army as part of the Syrian civil war that began with the Syrian Revolution in 2011. The capture of Damascus marked the end of the Assad family's rule, which had governed Syria as a hereditary sectarian totalitarian regime since Hafez al-Assad assumed power in 1971 following a coup d'état.

Then, HTS leader Ahmed al-Sharaa became the de facto leader of Syria on 8 December 2024, serving as General Commander and head of the New Syrian Administration. After the fall of the Assad regime, Mohammad Ghazi al-Jalali, Bashar al-Assad’s ninth prime minister, remained in office in a caretaker capacity with the support of the opposition and al-Sharaa until a caretaker government led by Mohammed al-Bashir was formed, and the position of prime minister was subsequently abolished on 29 March 2025 when the Syrian transitional government replaced the caretaker administration.

=== December 2024 conference ===
Al-Sharaa held a similar conference in Damascus in late December 2024, where various groups agreed to merge under the Defense Ministry.

Those who were present at the December conference included: Fadlallah al-Haji, the head of the National Front for Liberation, Azzam al-Gharib, the head of the Levant Front, Essam al-Buwaydhani, the head of Jaysh al-Islam, Al-Mutasim Abbas, the head of the Mu'tasim Division, Muhammad al-Dairi, the head of the Third Legion of the Syrian National Army, Saleh Amouri, a leader in the Northern Storm Brigade, Amer al-Sheikh, the head of Ahrar al-Sham, Abu Saleh Tahan, the head of Jaysh al-Ahrar, Mondher Saras, the head of the Sham Legion, and Abu Hatem Shaqra, the head of the Liberation and Construction Movement. Imad Abu Zureiq, Mohammad Mahameed, Abu Munther al Duhni and Abu Shareef al Mahameed, all of whom who had reconciled with the regime in 2018, were also present. Al-Sharaa spoke with Essam al-Buwaydhani, the head of Jaysh al-Islam, and shook his hand, signaling a thaw in relations between the groups. Various rebel leaders from the southern governorate of Daraa were present, including Ali Bash, Abu Ali Mustafa, Abu Murshed and Abu Hayan Hit. Some of the rebel figures who attended that meeting, including al-Gharib and Murhaf Abu Qasra, have been appointed to either political or military positions in the new administration.

The head of the Southern Operations Room, Ahmad al-Awda, did not attend.

== Objectives ==
In January 2025, opposition groups announced their disbandment during the Victory Conference, with areas in green being under their control at that moment

During the conference, al-Sharaa gave a brief speech, outlining the transitional government's immediate priorities which included: "filling the power vacuum, maintaining civil peace, building state institutions, building and developing the economy and restoring Syria's international and regional standing."

Abdul Ghani announced that 8 December, the date of the fall of the Assad regime, would be declared a national day. He also announced "the abolition of the 2012 Syrian constitution and the suspension of all exceptional laws", "the dissolution of the People's Assembly and its committees", "the dissolution of the former regime's army and the establishment of a new army," the dissolution of the Ba'athist regime's intelligence and security apparatuses, "along with ... the militias it established", "the dissolution of the Syrian Arab Socialist Ba'ath Party and member parties of the National Progressive Front bloc", "the dissolution of all armed factions, political, and civilian revolutionary bodies, and their merger into state institutions", and the appointment of Ahmed al-Sharaa as president of Syria for the transitional period, and the formation of the Interim Legislative Council until a "permanent constitution" is approved and enacted.

Al-Sharaa was appointed president by the Syrian General Command. After his appointment as president, al-Sharaa, in his first address on 31 January 2025, stated that he would hold a "national dialogue conference" and issue a "constitutional declaration" to serve as a "legal reference" during the political transition following the dissolution of the 2012 Syrian constitution. Al-Sharaa declared that he would "pursue the criminals who shed Syrian blood and committed massacres and crimes."

== Participants ==
Those who were present at the conference included: Amer al-Sheikh, the head of Ahrar al-Sham and governor of Rif Dimashq, Ahmad Issa al-Sheikh, the head of the Suqour al-Sham Brigades and then-governor of Idlib, Azzam al-Gharib, the head of the Levant Front and governor of Aleppo, Fadlallah al-Haji, the head of the Sham Legion and chief of staff of the Syrian National Army, Sayf Bulad, the head of the Turkish-backed Hamza Division, Abu Amsha, the head of the Turkish-backed Sultan Suleiman Shah Brigade, Salem Turki al-Antri, the head of the US-backed Syrian Free Army, Jamil al-Saleh, the head of Jaysh al-Izza and Abu Hatem Shaqra, the head of Ahrar al-Sharqiya. The Eighth Brigade from Daraa was also present. The Southern Operations Room, as well as local groups from Suwayda and the Syrian Democratic Forces, were excluded.

Groups that announced their pending dissolution included: Hay'at Tahrir al-Sham, Ahrar al-Sham, Jaysh al-Izza, Jaysh al-Nasr, Ansar al-Tawhid, Sham Legion, Jaysh al-Ahrar, the Suqour al-Sham Brigades, Jama'at Ansar al-Islam, Turkistan Islamic Party in Syria, Liwa al-Muhajireen wal-Ansar, Nour al-Din al-Zenki Movement, the Levant Front and the Syrian National Army.

== Aftermath ==
=== Reactions ===
Al-Sharaa received congratulations from the leaders of many countries, including Afghanistan, Azerbaijan, Canada, Egypt, Jordan, Kuwait, Mauritania, Morocco, Pakistan, Palestine, Russia, Saudi Arabia, Somalia, and the United Arab Emirates, on his appointment as President of Syria. On 30 January 2025, the head of the Syrian Interim Government (SIG) in northern Syria, Abdurrahman Mustafa, congratulated al-Sharaa on becoming president, it was also announced that the SIG would be at the disposal of the caretaker government. The Syrian Islamic Council and the Muslim Brotherhood in Syria congratulated al-Sharaa on his appointment as President of Syria.

President Aidarus al-Zoubaidi, President of Yemen's Southern Transitional Council and Vice Chairman of Yemen's Presidential Leadership Council, congratulated al-Sharaa on his assumption of the presidency of the Syrian Arab Republic. On 1 February 2025, Jasem Mohamed al-Budaiwi, Secretary-General of the Gulf Cooperation Council (GCC), congratulated al-Sharaa on assuming Syria’s presidency, expressing confidence in his leadership and reaffirming the GCC’s support during the transitional period.

=== North and East Syria ===
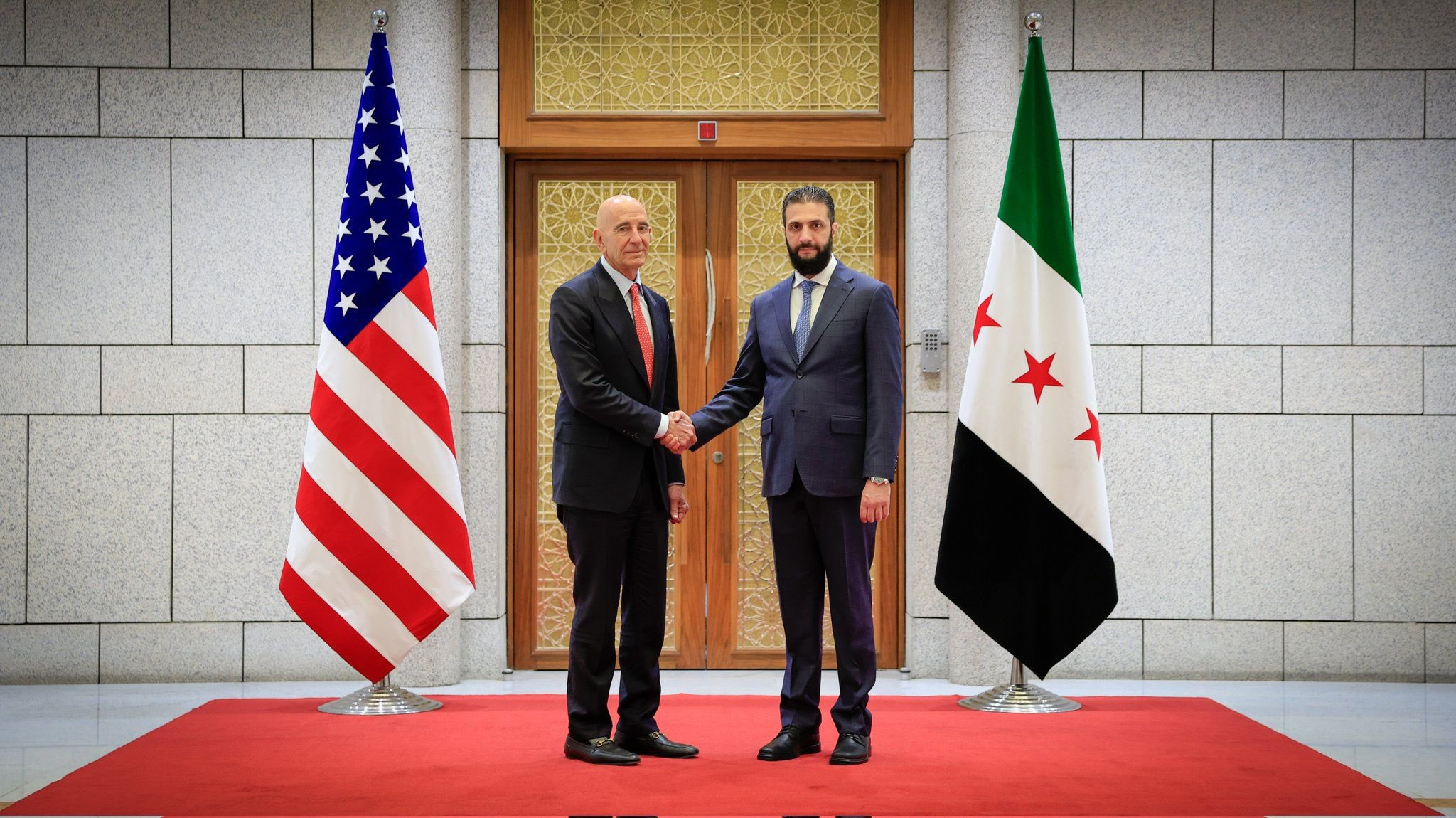
United States Special Envoy Tom Barrack with Syrian president Ahmed al-Sharaa in Damascus, May 2025. The U.S. mediated the 10 March agreement between the Syrian Democratic Forces (SDF) and the Syrian government

On 2 February, the Democratic Autonomous Administration of North and East Syria (DAANES) said it condemned the holding of the Victory Conference, “especially since some of the attendees were individuals listed as terrorists whose hands are stained with the blood of the Syrian people… We affirm that such a meeting is illegal and does not represent the aspirations of Syria’s diverse components.” The DAANES also criticized Damascus for excluding other ethnic and religious groups. On 17 February, Mazloum Abdi, Commander-in-Chief of the Syrian Democratic Forces (SDF), congratulated al-Sharaa on assuming the Syrian presidency and invited him to visit northeastern Syria.

On 10 March, al-Sharaa signed an agreement with Abdi to integrate the SDF into state institutions and bring northeastern Syria under central government control. The deal includes a ceasefire, the merger of forces, and the transfer of border crossings, airports, and oil fields to the Syrian state. It also recognizes the Kurdish community as an essential part of Syria, ensuring their constitutional rights and citizenship protections. The agreement was welcomed by France and the European Council, among others. The deadline for the merger is set for the end of 2025, but negotiations on integration remained inconclusive throughout the summer.

From 6–10 January 2026, Syrian Army forces captured Aleppo’s Kurdish districts, and on 16 January, al-Sharaa recognized Syrian Kurds as part of the nation, made Kurdish an official language, and declared Nowruz a national holiday. During the 13–27 January offensive, Arab tribes sided with the transitional government, the SDF retreated, and DAANES de facto collapsed, with ceasefires announced on 20 and 31 January.

=== Subsequent activities ===
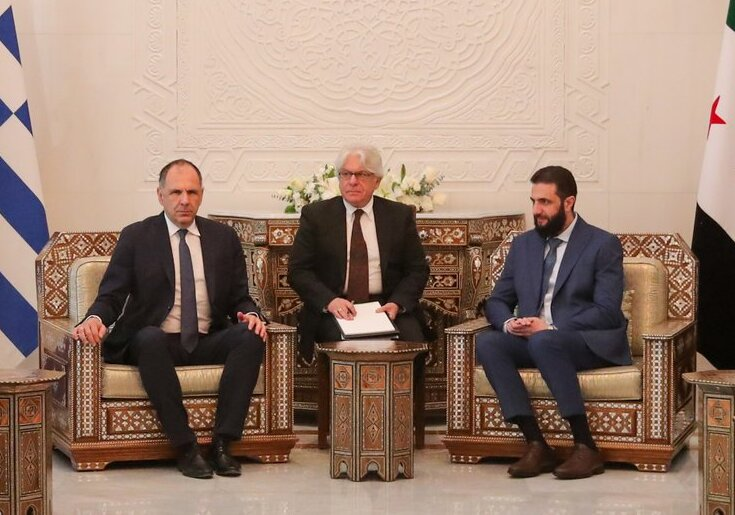
Syrian President Ahmed al-Sharaa with Greek Foreign Minister Giorgos Gerapetritis in Syria on 9 February 2025

On 30 January 2025, a day after appointing al-Sharaa as president, Qatari Emir Tamim bin Hamad Al Thani became the first head of state to visit Damascus since the fall of the Assad regime, discussing post-conflict reconstruction in Syria and other topics.

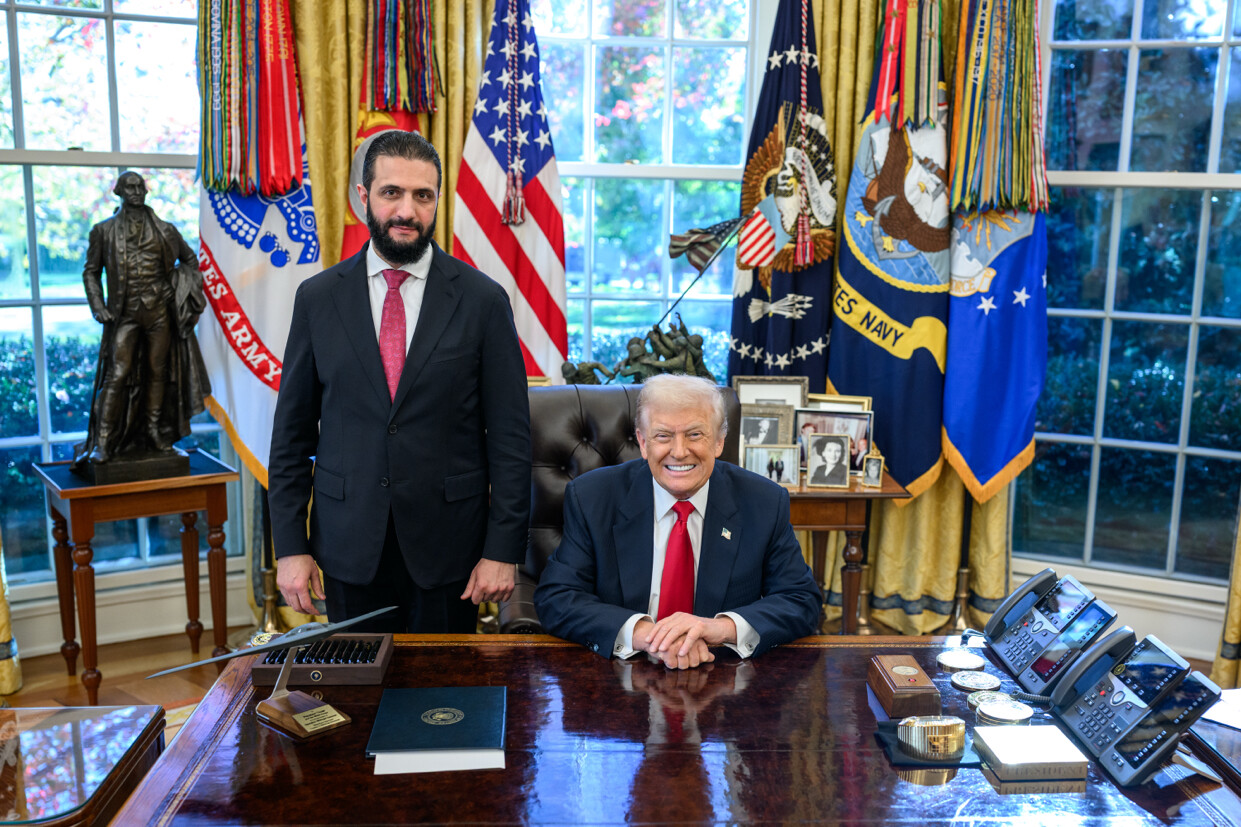
U.S. President Donald Trump with Syrian President Ahmed al-Sharaa in the Oval Office on 10 November 2025. The visit marked the first time a Syrian president had visited the White House since Syria gained independence in 1946.

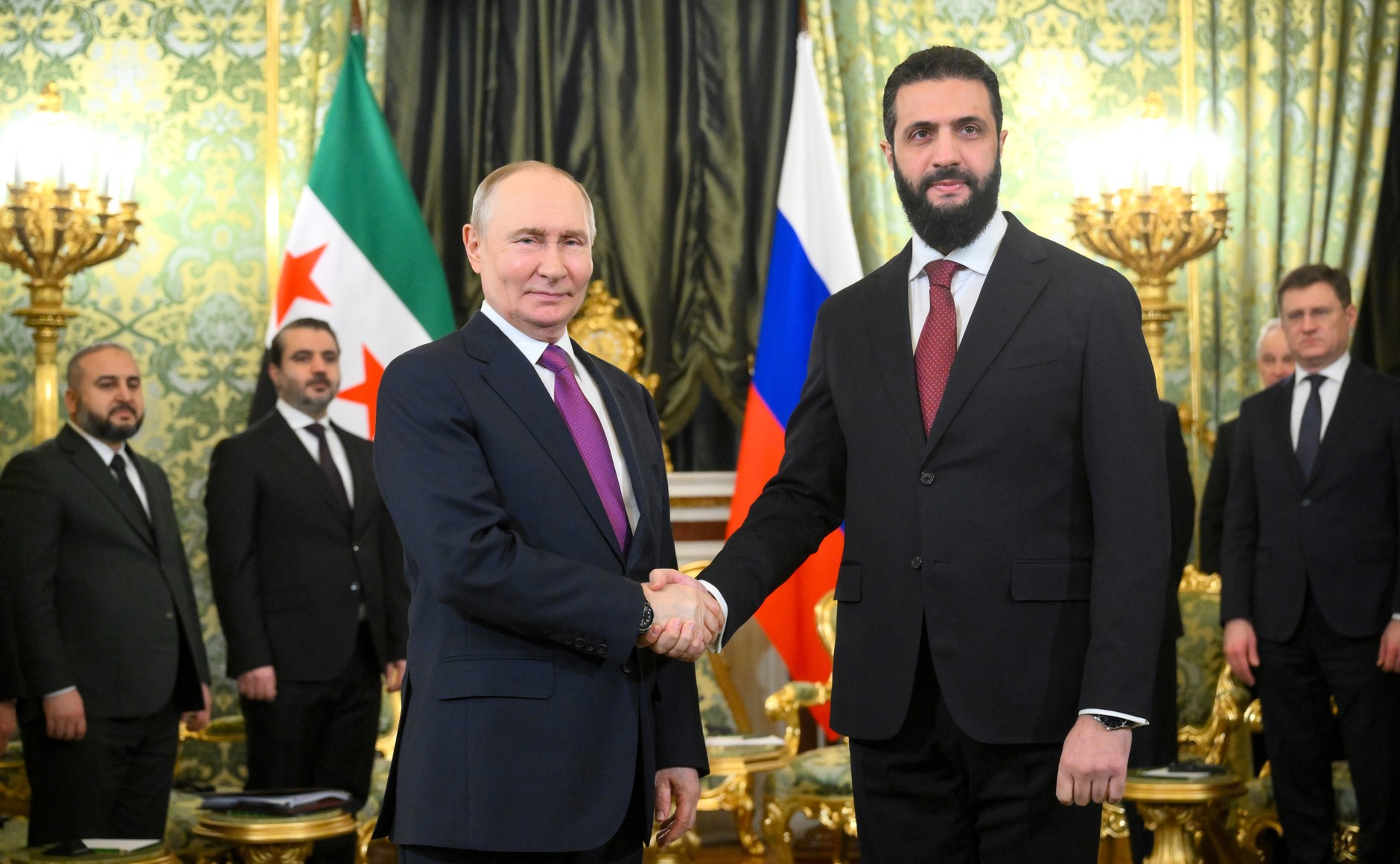
Syrian President Ahmed al-Sharaa with Russian president Vladimir Putin, 28 January 2026

In February 2025, the transitional government deployed its forces into areas under SIG control, as the Syrian National Army (SNA) started to merge with the newly formed Syrian Army and began dismantling barracks and other military infrastructure. Areas of Tell Abyad District and Ras al-Ayn District in Northeastern Syria has been under the administration of the transitional government since March 2025, but Turkish troops still remain. Military occupation in the rest of the Aleppo Governorate ended in March 2025, except for the Afrin District which ended in September 2025. By January 2026, all of the aforementioned areas is under the administration of the Syrian transitional government, as the remaining SNA was incorporated into the Ministry of Defense in 2025.

On 2 February 2025, al-Sharaa and foreign minister Asaad al-Shaibani visited Saudi Arabia and met with Saudi Prince Mohammed bin Salman. This was al-Sharaa's first foreign visit since the fall of the Assad regime. Later, on 4 February, al-Sharaa visited Turkey as his second foreign visit and met with President Recep Tayyip Erdoğan. On 12 February, al-Sharaa held a phone call with Russian president Vladimir Putin, in what was the latter's first contact with a Syrian head of state since Assad's overthrow. On the same day, two major organizations of the former Syrian opposition, the Syrian National Coalition and the Syrian Negotiation Commission, announced their allegiance to the caretaker government. On 17 February, al-Sharaa made his first official trip to the coastal provinces of Latakia and Tartus, which were once strongholds of the ousted president Bashar al-Assad. On 26 February, al-Sharaa met with King Abdullah II of Jordan in Amman during his third foreign trip. In March 2025, al-Sharaa signed a constitutional declaration establishing a five-year transitional period and announced the formation of a transitional government.

On 7 May, al-Sharaa met with French President Emmanuel Macron in Paris, marking his first official visit to a Western country since becoming president of Syria, and on 14 May he met with U.S. President Donald Trump in Saudi Arabia, the first meeting between American and Syrian presidents since Bill Clinton and Hafez al-Assad convened in Geneva in 2000.

On 24 September, al-Sharaa addressed the general debate of the 80th session of the United Nations General Assembly, becoming the first Syrian leader to do so since Nureddin al-Atassi in 1967. (Note: Nureddin al-Atassi spoke after the Six-Day War, not during the general debate. Neither Hafez al-Assad nor Bashar al-Assad spoke at the UNGA during their presidencies.) In November 2025, al-Sharaa arrived in Brazil to attend the 2025 United Nations Climate Change Conference, marking the first time a Syrian president has participated in the annual climate summit since its establishment in 1995. On 15 October, he met President Vladimir Putin in Russia. It was his first official visit since the fall of Kremlin ally Bashar al-Assad and the latter’s subsequent exile to Russia.

On 4 December, al-Sharaa met with a delegation from the United Nations Security Council and several United Nations officials at the People’s Palace in Damascus, alongside a number of Syrian ministers, marking the delegation’s first visit to Syria since the Council’s establishment in 1945. Since then, a number of Western governments have lifted the sanctions on Syria, most notably the United States and the United Kingdom.

On 29 January 2026, al-Sharaa marked one year since assuming the presidency of Syria, saying on Twitter,

“A year has passed since I bore the trust of the presidency of the Syrian Arab Republic. I recall the sacrifices of the Syrian people and their patience in all fields, and I pray to God to make me worthy of this trust.” “The future is built together, with steadfast justice, lasting stability, and comprehensive development that restores Syria’s position and fulfills the aspirations of its people.”

== See also ==
- History of Syria
- Syrian National Dialogue Conference
