= Imad Abu Zureiq =

- Native name: عماد أبو زريق
- Born: 9 February 1979 (age 47); Daraa, Syria
- Allegiance: Yarmouk Army; Army of the Revolution; Eighth Brigade
- Conflicts: Syrian civil war

Imad Mohammed Abu Zureiq (Arabic: عماد محمد أبو زريق) is a Syrian rebel leader who served a key role in the Yarmouk Army, an anti-Assad group in the Free Syrian Army, until he reconciled with the Bashar al-Assad regime in 2018. He was arrested in December 2025, a year after the fall of the regime.

== Personal life ==
Abu Zureiq is a native of Nasib and was the target of multiple assassination attempts.

== Activities ==
He joined the anti-Assad forces in 2011 and became the "security chief" for the Yarmouk Army.

He returned from Jordan in 2019 and reconciled with the Bashar al-Assad regime following its 2018 takeover of Southern Syria. A group led by Abu Zureiq arrived in Saida, Syria from the village of Nasib in early May 2021 and attacked the Fifth Corps, seeking to arrest one of their members; the clashes resulted in injuries on both sides. The Nasib Border Crossing, which borders Syria and Jordan, was initially under the control of the Air Force Intelligence Directorate, though the Military Intelligence Directorate was transferred control of it in November 2021. A group led by Abu Zureiq was given control of the crossing, reportedly at the behest of Russia, who felt that Air Force Intelligence was too close to Iran. According to an anonymous government leader, the Assad regime utilized former Syrian opposition leaders like Abu Zureiq as they were familiar with the opposition and the "local dialect." He was in charge of a May 2023 raid on a farm in Maaraba, Daraa, where two people were arrested, though the anti-drug enforcement of the regime was viewed skeptically. Abu Zureiq and other reconciled rebels, including Ali al-Miqdad and Moayad al-Aqra, worked under Louay al-Ali, the head of the Military Intelligence Directorate in Daraa governorate. Abu Zureiq facilitated al-Ali's escape after the fall of the Assad regime in December 2024.

He was present at the December 2024 victory conference in Damascus, where numerous members of the Syrian opposition met with Ahmed al-Sharaa, the new leader of Syria.

On 27 December 2025, the Syrian Ministry of Interior announced his arrest.

== Sanctions ==
Abu Zureiq was sanctioned by the United States Department of the Treasury, as well as the United Kingdom's Foreign, Commonwealth and Development Office, in March 2023 over his ties to captagon smuggling.
