= March 2020 Daraa clashes =

Part of the Syrian Civil War

- Part of the Daraa insurgency of the Syrian Civil War
- Map showing the Daraa insurgency attacks
| Date | 1–3 March 2020 (2 days) |
| Location | Western and eastern part of Daraa Governorate, Syria |
| Result | Status quo preserved: Rebels capture several checkpoints and buildings in Muzayrib, Tafas, and several other towns in the province.; Government control over Al-Sanamayn restored on 3 March after rebels evacuate from the town. |

Belligerents
| (Syria) Syrian Government | Reconciled Free Syrian Army fighters; Thuwar al-Sanamayn; Various fighters elsewhere in the province; Syrian Opposition loyalists |

Commanders and leaders
| Maj. Gen. Hossam Louka (Head of Security Committee in Daraa); Brig. Gen. Louay al-Ali (Head of Military Intelligence Directorate in Daraa); Thaer Al-Abbas (leader of Popular Committees in Sanamayn); Imad Jamal al-Labad | Walid al-Zahra † (leader of Thuwar al-Sanamayn) |

Units involved
| Syrian Armed Forces; Syrian Arab Army; 9th Armoured Division; 43rd Armoured Brigade; 4th Armoured Division; 5th Armoured Division; 112th Mechanized Brigade; 79th Brigade; 15th Special Forces Division; Air Force Intelligence Directorate; National Defense Force; Popular Committees (Sanamayn); Imad Jamal al-Labad group; Syrian Military Intelligence | Various anti-government militants |

Strength
| 1,000+ soldiers (Sanamayn); Unknown (rest of province) | 125 militants (Sanamayn); Unknown (rest of province) |

Casualties and losses
| 4 soldiers killed | 10 militants killed 4 militants wounded |
- 7 civilians killed, 15 wounded

The March 2020 Daraa clashes was an armed conflict between rebel fighters aligned with the Free Syrian Army and Syrian government forces in the Daraa Governorate. Clashes began after the start of a government security operation against FSA insurgent cells in Al-Sanamayn and other areas in the Daraa governorate that have been active since 2018 after the defeat of rebel forces in the province. Retaliation against the crackdown by rebels across the province led to a scale of fighting unseen since the government offensive in 2018. The fighters involved in the attack are believed to be former rebel fighters that surrendered to the government in 2018, as well as former rebels that defected to the government, and had been working against the government from within.

== Background ==
Following the 2018 offensive that brought Daraa under control of the Syrian Arab Army, tensions between reconciled rebels and the Syrian government remained high. Many rebel forces in the area agreed to Russian-brokered reconciliation deals, in which they laid down their weapons against the forces of Bashar al-Assad. Those who did not agree to the terms were sent to rebel-held areas in Idlib Governorate by bus. However, forced disappearances, forced conscription and assassinations of former rebel fighters and commanders became common.

A low-level insurgency against the Syrian government began. Rebel cells and insurgents have targeted army checkpoints, Syrian intelligence agencies, and reconciled rebels they accused of collaborating with the government.

Formerly rebel-held towns soon became hotspots for insurgent activity. One such town was al-Sanamayn, where a former Ahrar al-Sham commander, Walid al-Zahra, had returned with a band of fighters from around Daraa province originally from the city in 2018. Al-Zahra and the group, Thuwar al-Sanamayn, gained notoriety as they carried out multiple attacks on army checkpoints and security centers during the ongoing insurgency in Daraa governorate. Leading up to the military operation in Sanamyan, regular forces there were regularly engaged in clashes with rebels there.

== Clashes ==
=== Prelude ===
On the night of 29 February 2020, two divisions of the 4th Armored Division and 9th Armoured Division moved from Damascus towards Sanamayn in preparation to storm the town. In the morning of 1 March 2020, Reinforcements from the 5th division's 112th brigade in Izra, the 15th brigade east of Inkhil, the 9th division's 43rd tank brigade and several pro-government militias arrived outside Sanamayn in preparation for the storming of the city.

=== Battle for Sanamayn ===
After Sanamayn was besieged by the Syrian military, the security operation against insurgent cells in the western and northern areas of the city began. Pro-government forces entered Sanamayn from several axes backed by artillery support from the 43rd brigade east of Bassir, and mortar shelling from the 9th division and 79th brigade east of the city. The rebel-held areas in north and west Sanamayn were targeted with rockets and missiles, damaging a mosque and several homes. Tank and mortar fire led to casualties among civilians. Heavy fighting took place, especially in the Al-Atoum neighborhood, with pro-government forces advancing in the area. The Syrian Army faced violent resistance, with insurgents destroying a car carrying several soldiers with an RPG at the entrance to the western neighborhoods and damaging a tank. Several pro-government fighters were killed, including a leader of military security. On 2 March, heavy clashes resumed in the city, coinciding with renewed artillery shelling by the Syrian Army.

Seven rebels were killed in the clashes in Al-Sanamayn, including their leader, Walid al-Zahra. Other accounts list the death toll for all sides in the city to be as high as 30 dead.

=== Clashes in the rest of the province ===
In response to the military operation in Sanamayn, attacks were conducted against the Syrian Army in the western and eastern countryside of Daraa. After a failed attack on Tafas by the Syrian Army, ex-rebels counterattacked, seizing the Tablin checkpoint between Tafas and the town of Da'el in the western countryside. The Syrian Army brought reinforcements from the town of Tal al-Khader towards the checkpoint, but were stopped by rebels, resulting in a tank being disabled. Tanks positioned in Tal al-Khader fired at the town of Tafas, killing three fighters. The town of Muzayrib was captured by reconciled rebels, who also took control of the Saeqa camp inside the town.

Anti-government fighters attacked and seized an army checkpoint in the Jaleen Housing district, a suburb in western Daraa, capturing four officers. Rebels elsewhere captured two soldiers of the fourth division in Al-Karak al-Sharqi and blocked routes west of Daraa. The rebels also seized Air Intelligence checkpoints in the towns of Karak and al-Joulan, taking several members hostage. Opposition loyalists set up roadblocks in Nawa, Muzayrib and Karak to stop army movements. A soldier was killed in front of his home in Daraa al-Balad by unknown gunmen and the bodies of three soldiers were found in the western countryside near Muzayrib. A group of opposition fighters from Jasim attacked a Syrian army checkpoint near the town, killing two soldiers and injuring several others. Demonstrations took place at the Al-Omari Mosque in Daraa al-Balad and in the town Bosra al-Sham against the operation in Sanamayn, with the protests in Daraa al-Balad being attended by an ex-rebel leader.

On 2 March, rebels attacked a checkpoint of the Syrian Army in Al-Sahwah with machine guns and RPGs, as well as the al-Hajjanah checkpoint in Hayt village west of the city of Daraa. Two Air-Intelligence checkpoints near Al-Harak and in an area between Alma and Al-Surah were attacked, leading to human losses.

=== End of hostilities ===
A Russian-brokered agreement was reached between the two sides on 2 March 2020. Rebel fighters in Sanamayn were to reconcile and hand over their weapons to the Syrian authorities under Russian auspices. Fighters were also given the option to be transported to the rebel-held north of the country, or to the Tafas and Bosra al-Sham areas, controlled by reconciled rebels and the Russian-backed 5th corps respectively. In return, 52 soldiers captured by rebels in the western countryside of Daraa were released. 80 fighters chose to stay in the city and settle their status, while 25 were evacuated to the town of Tafas. 21 rebels were evacuated on 3 March to Al-Bab. Upon arrival, four were sent to hospitals to be treated for injuries received during fighting, while the rest were sent to training camps near the city.

== Aftermath ==
Major General Hossam Louka ordered the notables of Jasim to hand over the ex-rebels responsible for the attack on the checkpoint near the town. Activists in the Daraa countryside expressed concern that the Syrian Army may replicate their strategy in Sanamayn with other towns in the Houran where reconciled rebels were present. The SAA brought in tens of reinforcements to the outskirts of the towns of Tafas and Jasim city, and placed artillery on the hills of Metweq and Om Horam. A Russian delegation entered Tafas to monitor progress of the deals. On 12 March, dignitaries from Jasim city and other towns were summoned by the Syrian authorities, who requested for the rebels inside to hand over their weapons, giving the opposition forces inside a period of ten days to hand over their weapons before the SAA stormed the city and disarmed them by force.

On 18 March, Syrian Army reinforcements brought to Daraa governorate opened fire on former opposition commanders, as they passed through checkpoints in the town of Jaleen Housing, killing two and injuring one. The government forces withdrew from Jaleen back to their barracks after three soldiers were killed. Later that day, the Syrian Army and loyalists began shelling the town, killing eight civilians and injuring four others. The Syrian Army also shelled the town of Tasil.

On 25 March, two young men from Bosra al-Sham were kidnapped by a kidnapping gang from As-Suwayda, who took the men to the town of Al-Quraya. Two days later, violent clashes took place after gunmen from Bosra al-Sham attempted to infiltrate the province and attacked the town of Al-Quraya, where the two men were being held. They were repelled by the Syrian Army and pro-government local factions. Four of the attackers and ten members of the local factions were killed in the clashes, and six fighters were captured. A car was targeted by the gunmen during the fighting, leading to the death of one civilian. The kidnapping gang's ringleader killed himself with a suicide belt after being sought out by the local authorities in Al-Quraya. The next day, on 28 March, the six captured fighters from Al-Quraya were executed in Bosra al-Sham.

In November 2020, clashes would again take place in Daraa province after an attempted incursion by the Syrian Army into Daraa al-Balad, resulting in government forces launching a failed attack on the town of Karak the following day. Mediation from the 8th Brigade of the 5th Corps ended the clashes.
