= Popular Resistance =

Popular Resistance (Arabic: المقاومة الشعبية; Al-Muqawamat ash-Sha'abiyah) is the term used to describe the coalitions of different groups with a common mission. This collation can be armed and non-armed. Popular Resistance can refer to different entities depending on the context, like:

- Popular Resistance (Daraa) – a Syrian insurgent group that operated in Daraa Governorate
- Popular Resistance Association – Russian national anarchist organization
- Popular Resistance Committees – a coalition of a number of armed Palestinian groups opposed to what they regard as the conciliatory approach of the Palestinian Authority and Fatah towards Israel
- Popular Resistance Committees (Yemen) – armed groups that have been established in several Yemeni provinces during the Yemeni Civil War
- Popular Resistance of the Eastern Region – Insurgent group in the Syrian civil war
- Popular Resistance of Sudan – a group, including the Al-Bara' ibn Malik Battalion, that fights alongside the Sudanese army
- Popular Resistance of Ukraine – Ukrainian underground partisan organization
- National Popular Resistance Front – a wide coalition of Honduran grassroots organisations and political parties and movements
- PopularResistance.Org – a platform that provides a daily stream of resistance news from across the United States and around the world.

== See also ==
- Resistance (disambiguation)
- Popular Defence Forces
