= Adham al-Akrad =

Syrian rebel leader (1974–2020)

- Born: 1974; Daraa, Syria
- Died: 14 October 2020 (aged 45–46); Tubna, Syria
- Military career
- Allegiance: (Syrian opposition) Free Syrian Army
- Branch: Southern Front
- Commands: Engineering and Missiles Regiment

Adham al-Akrad, also known by his kunya Abu Qusay (1974 – 14 October 2020), was a Syrian rebel leader in Daraa Governorate during the Syrian revolution. He agreed to a settlement with the government after the governorate came under the Syrian army's control in 2018.

Al-Akrad was a strong critic of the regime and the Iranian presence in the south. He was killed on his way to or on his way from a meeting in Damascus in October 2020.

== Activities ==
He served as the head of the Engineering and Missile Battalion and was also part of the al-Bunyan al-Marsous Operations Room.

He was part of a group of opposition figures, including Bashar al-Zoubi and Ahmad al-Awda, who met with the Syrian government and an unnamed Russian general to discuss a settlement in June 2018.

He reconciled with the Syrian government in 2018. His car was unsuccessfully targeted by an IED in September 2019, as it was unoccupied.

He met with local leaders in Daraa in January 2020 and was one of the signatories of a "nine-point" document for the Syrian government regarding "arrests and disappearances, local autonomy and the fate of detainees."

He expressed regret over the reconciliation in a July 2020 interview, stating that portions of the agreed-upon settlement with the Russians were not completed and that after more than two years following the settlements, "the arrests and assassinations had doubled."

He was a member of the Central Committees. Nonetheless, he attempted to persuade Daraa residents from allying with the regime during battles in Idlib and Hama. He also emphasized his support for the revolution.

== Personal life ==
He was living in the United Arab Emirates before the start of the Syrian civil uprising in March 2011.

== Death ==
He was killed on 14 October 2020 in the city of Tubna on the orders of Wassim Al-Zarqan, who was a military official in the Assad regime, while al-Akrad was on his way to or from Damascus, in order to negotiate the returning of bodies of dead FSA fighters.

Al-Zarqan, also a former opposition fighter who settled with the government in 2018, was killed in April 2023.
