= Mohammed Hassan Salama =

- Born: Syria
- Military career
- Allegiance: Syria (previously) Syrian National Council (present)
- Branch: Free Syrian Army
- Rank: Lieutenant colonel
- Unit: Dawn of Islam Division
- Conflicts: Syrian civil war

Mohammed Hassan Salama is a Free Syrian Army lieutenant colonel, who defected from the Syrian Army to the FSA. He is the commander of the Dawn of Islam Division since late February 2013. His group received U.S.-made BGM-71 TOW anti-tank missile.
