= Central Committees (Syria) =

The Central Committees, also called the Central Negotiations Committee, were governing structures established in Southern Syria following the 2018 Southern Syria offensive, which resulted in the Assad regime retaking control of the area. The groups have continued after the December 2024 fall of the Assad regime.

== History ==
=== Formation ===
As part of the 2018 ceasefire negotiated between Southern rebels and Assad's forces, Russia brokered an agreement where the former rebels were given the choice of staying in the area, giving their heavy weapons to the government and reintegrating into the Syrian Arab Army, or, if opposed to the deal, they were sent to Idlib.

Three Central Committees were formed in 2018, with a Central Committee in East Daraa, another in Daraa and a third in Western Daraa.

Ahmad al-Awda, a former leader in the Youth of Sunna Forces, was given leadership over the Eighth Brigade of the 5th Corps. Others who reintegrated were Imad Abu Zureiq, Ali al-Miqdad and Moayad al-Aqra, all of whom were involved in the captagon trade and worked under Louay al-Ali, who headed the Military Intelligence Directorate in Daraa.

Al-Ali gave the Central Committee control over "state-owned" land, including various farms, as well as control of dams in the Yarmouk Basin, as ways to gain money.

=== Decline and reported dissolutions ===
The role of the Central Committees had weakened by 2019, as the Russians failed to uphold what they had agreed upon, including "pressuring the Syrian regime to release detainees, withdrawing the security checkpoints, returning the dismissed employees, and resolving the issue of defectors."

Various high-ranking Assad regime members, including Hossam Louka, the head of the Security Committee in Daraa, Louay al-Ali, the head of the Military Intelligence Directorate in Suwayda, and Ghiath Dalla, the head of the 42nd Brigade of the 4th Armoured Division, met with members of the Daraa Central Committee, as well as factions that reconciled with the regime, in May 2020 to discuss reducing tensions following the killings of nine Internal Security officers in Muzayrib earlier in the month.

The 4th Division, after a meeting in January 2021 with people from Tafas and the Central Committee from Daraa, alongside Russian military police, called on various opposition leaders in Daraa, including "Iyad al-Ghanim, Abu Omar al-Shaghouri, Moaz al-Zoubi, Muhammad Qasim al-Subaihi, Iyad Ja`ara and Muhammad al-Ibrahim" to surrender, with the Russians threatening to use airstrikes. They also called for the giving up of "medium and heavy weapons", which the Central Committee in Daraa was reluctant to do.

According to Syria Direct, by December 2021, two of the three committees had disbanded in 2021, following various assassinations, leaving the East Daraa Central Committee as the sole functioning organization. However a report from February 2025 indicates that all three committees are still active.

The Assad regime "targeted" members of the committees, as they began to enjoy popularity among the people.

The Central Committee in western Daraa took part in an anti-drug trafficking operation in late January 2024, raiding farms which were owned by a known drug trafficker.

According to an anonymous member of the Central Committees, the "security services" were the greatest obstacle to implement the settlement agreements.

== Fall of the Assad regime ==
The Southern Operations Room, which announced itself in December 2024, included the Central Committees as one of its components.

In the aftermath of the fall of the Assad regime, Abu Zureiq reportedly helped al-Ali escape.

The collapse of the regime has strengthened various ISIS cells in the area, which looted arms from military bases near Al-Sanamayn.

Armed groups affiliated with the committees have negotiated with the Hay'at Tahrir al-Sham-led administration over their inclusion in the new Syrian army and are expected to merge into the Syrian ministry of defense as one brigade.

Two former members of the Central Committees, who had since joined the General Security Forces, were killed in Muzayrib in April 2025.

According to the Emirates Policy Center, the Central Committee in Daraa has refused to integrate, while the Central Committee in Daraa al-Balad has chosen to integrate.
