= Bashar al-Zoubi =

Free Syrian Army officer

- بشار الزعبي
- Born: Syria
- Military career
- Allegiance: Ba'athist Syria (?-2011) Syrian National Council (present)
- Branch: Free Syrian Army
- Rank: General
- Nickname: Abu Fadi
- Units: Southern Front; Yarmouk Brigade
- Conflicts: Syrian civil war: Battle of Nasib Border Crossing; Daraa and As-Suwayda offensive (June 2015)

Bashar al-Zoubi (Arabic: بشار الزعبي), also known as Abu Fadi, is a Syrian general-turned rebel leader who defected from the Syrian Armed Forces. He became the leader of the Southern Front. He was also the head of the Yarmouk Brigade.

== Personal life ==
Al-Zoubi, a native of Al Taybah, "made his fortune in the tourism industry" and is from the al-Zoubi clan.

== Syrian civil war ==
Al-Zoubi defected from the Syrian government in 2011. He later became the "commander-in-chief" of the Southern Front, as well as the head of the Yarmouk Brigade.

Al-Zoubi was part of an "opposition delegation", including Adham al-Akrad and Ahmad al-Awda, which negotiated with Russia in late June 2018, though he rejected the proposed terms of the settlement.

An unsuccessful assassination attempt on his life was made in December 2013.
