= Thuwar al-Sanamayn =

- ثوار الصنمين
- Founder: Walid al-Zahra †
- Leader: Walid al-Zahra †
- Dates active: c. 2018-2020; 2025-present (remnants)
- Country: Syria
- Allegiance: (Syria) Free Syrian Army
- Headquarters: Al-Sanamayn
- Active regions: Daraa Governorate
- Ideology: Anti-Assadism
- Wars: Syrian Civil War; Daraa insurgency; March 2020 Daraa clashes

Thuwar al-Sanamayn (Arabic: ثوار الصنمين, romanized: thuaar alsanamayn, lit. 'The revolutionaries of Al-Sanamayn') is a militant organization in Syria.

== History ==
It was founded by Walid al-Zahra c. 2018 and fought against the Syrian Arab Armed Forces in Al-Sanamayn attacking checkpoints, during March 2020 Daraa clashes where they besieged the city of al-Sanamayn until the Syrian Arab Armed Forces killed Walid al-Zahra.

Thuwar al-Sanamayn attacked Mohsen al-Haymed Al-Haymed's group in 2025, calling them a "criminal gang that desecrated the land of Al-Sanamayn."
