= Walid al-Zahra =

Walid al-Atme
- Nickname(s): Walid al-Zahra
- Allegiance: Ahrar al-Sham; Thuwar al-Sanamayn
- Battles / wars: Syrian Civil War: March 2020 Daraa clashes

Walid al-Atme, commonly known by his nom de guerre Walid al-Zahra, was a former leader in Ahrar al-Sham in Southern Syria who later headed the rebel group Thuwar al-Sanamayn and died fighting against the Assad regime in March 2020.

== Life ==
He was from the southern city of Al-Sanamayn and was a fighter with Ahrar al-Sham. He notably refused to reconcile with the Assad regime in July 2018 following the 2018 Southern Syria offensive.

Clashes took place in 2019 between the Criminal Security Directorate of the Public Security Police, which was attempting to detain al-Zahra and his followers.

== Death ==
His forces unsuccessfully waged urban warfare against the 9th Armoured Division in al-Sanamayn in March 2020 and surrendered, with Al-Zahra reportedly dying in the clashes.

== Aftermath ==
The group that he formerly led reportedly clashed with members of Mohsen al-Haymed's faction in Daraa in 2025.
