= Southern Operations Room =

Rebel coalition in the Syrian civil war

- غُرْفَةُ العَمَلِيَّاتِ الجَنُوبِيَّةُ Ghurfat Al-Amaliyyat Al-Janoubiyya
- Logo of the Southern Operations Room
- Leaders: Ahmad al-Awda (leader of the organization); Nassim Abu Ara (military commander, spokesperson); Abu Murshed (deputy commander)
- Dates active: 6 December 2024 — present
- Country: Syria
- Active regions: Daraa Governorate; Suwayda Governorate; Quneitra Governorate; Rif Dimashq Governorate; Damascus Governorate

The Southern Operations Room (Arabic: غرفة العمليات الجنوبية, romanized: Ghurfat Aleamaliaat Aljanubia), abbreviated as SOR, and also translated as the Southern Operations Command, is a Syrian rebel coalition consisting of various Syrian opposition groups and defectors that initially operated in the southern provinces of Daraa, Suwayda and Quneitra, though they expanded to Damascus, and Rif Dimashq. The group withdrew from Damascus following HTS' arrival.

The Southern Operations Room publicly declared their formation on 6 December 2024, to coordinate the southern Syria offensive in the 2024 Syrian opposition offensives. The group originated in the Southern Front which previously fought against the Assad regime in an earlier phase of the war. The formation process for what would become the Southern Operations Room began in 2023, with advisers from the Hay'at Tahrir al-Sham-led Military Operations Command bringing together the leaders of around 25 opposition factions in southern Syria to coordinate planning for a future military operation.

The Southern Operations Room was the first rebel organization to capture Damascus during the Syrian civil war.

The Eighth Brigade, one of the constituent parts of the operations room, was dissolved as of 13 April 2025, following a standoff around the city of Busra al-Sham between itself and the Syrian transitional government. In a video statement released by the Eighth Brigade, the group's spokesman confirmed the decision to disband. After clashes with the central government in July, the Druze groups within the Southern Operations Room left the group to form their own coalition, the National Guard.

== History ==
=== Creation and structure ===
The operations room was preceded by the Southern Front.

The Southern Operations Room was announced on 6 December 2024 and was declared to consist of the 8th Brigade, and the Central Committee alongside other organizations that were based in the Suwayda and Quneitra Governorates. The 8th Brigade was previously known as the Youth of Sunna Forces. In the past, the 8th Brigade numbered about 1,200 militants, and was one of the biggest opposition groups in the Daraa Governorate prior to the 2018 reconciliation deal. The Central Committee had been active in the Syrian opposition since 2011. Their mandate was centered on two main goals: addressing community needs by guaranteeing stability and protection for Syrian citizens, and formalizing the Russian-sponsored reconciliation agreement into an accepted document. The Central Committee was accused of working with the Syrian government and its security forces at the expense of the local populace.

SOR consists of several branches: the eastern part of the city of Daraa is controlled by the 8th Brigade, it also controls some parts of Lajat area and other parts of eastern Daraa. The Daraa Tribe Council controls the central city and is in charge of Daraa al-Balad and Daraa Station. The western areas of the city are controlled by the Central Committee.

In the official statement made by the SOR command, the group pledged to maintain security and stability while controlling the southern regions of Syria. It additionally called on all the countries of the world to support the decision of the Syrian people to "gain freedom and build their own country".

The SOR has emphasized its objective of creating a "unified and just Syria" and characterized its militant campaign as a fight for "freedom and dignity." In order to avert chaos and create a stable post-conflict state, its leaders have urged the maintenance of state institutions previously controlled by opposing individuals whilst working with different Syrian communities.

=== Planned integration into the Ministry of Defense ===
The group had been in talks with the Syrian caretaker government to discuss becoming part of the Ministry of Defense as of December 2024. In a joint meeting with Hay'at Tahrir al-Sham (HTS) leader Ahmed al-Sharaa and commanders of several armed factions on 24 December, most commanders agreed to dissolve their factions and merge into the Ministry of Defense. Daraa groups are still reportedly negotiating their integration.

On 8 January 2025, Nassim Abu Ara, the spokesman for SOR, stated that SOR is not convinced by the idea of disbanding their armed groups, joining the new Syrian army, and integrating into the Ministry of Defense. Later, on 11 January 40 southern armed factions signed an agreement with the Syrian caretaker government to integrate them into Ministry of Defense. The Southern Operations Room was one of the organizations excluded from the late January Syrian Revolution Victory Conference, as were local groups from Suwayda and the Syrian Democratic Forces.

There were tensions between the Syrian Ministry of Defense and the Eighth Brigade in February 2025, which culminated in the dissolution of the Eighth Brigade in April.

=== Military actions ===
A year before the fall of the Assad regime, HTS sent a message to Southern rebel groups to prepare for a future offensive against the regime.

HTS helped organize the Operations Room to liberate Damascus, which included 25 rebel groups from three governorates in the South. The coordination of the Southern Syria offensive is attributed to SOR. With the help of other local opposition groups, SOR captured the city of Daraa and small towns around it after the withdrawal of Syrian Arab Armed Forces and pro-Assad Iranian armed groups. SOR claimed to have taken full control of the Daraa District and have started combing through its neighbourhoods and securing its institutions and government offices. SOR also said that it had fully taken control of Quneitra Governorate, near the Israeli-occupied Golan Heights in southwestern Syria. In response, the Israel Defense Forces said they deployed “reinforced forces in the Golan Heights area.”

On 7 December 2024, the spokesperson of SOR announced its plans to push toward Damascus, stating, "Our target is Damascus, and our meeting point is Umayyad Square." His statement also addressed people in Suwaida and Quneitra cities, saying, "We stand at the gates of Damascus as partners in this liberation alongside the steadfast people of Suwaida and the honorable revolutionaries of Quneitra. We extend our hands for cooperation with all components of a new, unified Syria—free from terrorism and sectarianism and aspiring for liberation from tyranny." Southern rebels together with SOR started encircling Damascus after capturing Al-Sanamayn, a town 20 km from the southern entrance of Damascus. They were supposed to wait until Homs fell so that the two rebel coalitions could approach Damascus at the same time, but the fighters started the offensive earlier.

Officials from numerous countries, who met on 7 December in Qatar, anticipated that the offensive would stop in Homs and would be followed by negotiations in Geneva, Switzerland. According to Nassim Abu Ara, an official with the 8th Brigade, as well as Mahmoud al-Bardan, a "rebel leader" in Daraa, the rebel group headed to Damascus to avoid a possible negotiated settlement with Assad.

The SOR was the first group to reach Damascus, where they were recognizable with their distinctive Southern Syrian headdress. President Bashar al-Assad escaped Syria on a plane to Russia. Over a Syrian state television broadcast, a group of opposition leaders declared victory. Prime Minister Mohammad Ghazi al-Jalali stated that his government was willing to "extend its hand" to the new opposition-led caretaker government, offering to work with it. The SOR secured government institutions and guarded regime officials, taking many to the Four Seasons Hotel for their protection.

Abu Ara withdrew SOR forces on 8 December to Daraa to avoid "chaos or armed clashes" with HTS. Abu Ara attributed the swift collapse of Syrian Arab Armed Forces to "the expansion of points of engagement and attacks from several areas in Daraa province, quickly taking control of many military positions and checkpoints", which, he stated, caused "a collapse in morale". After 9 December, the SOR rebels controlled the majority of southern Syrian provinces. On 11 December, al-Sharaa met with the leaders of the Southern Operations Room to discuss military and civilian affairs coordination. The discussion included "coordination", "cooperation" and a "unified effort."

The Military Operations Command sent "reinforcements" to Al-Sanamayn as the SOR conducted an operation there in early January 2025.

By April 2025, the Eighth Brigade had integrated into the transitional government forces, with the Druze factions of the SOR becoming part of the National Guard in Suwayda Governorate. As of July 2025, the transitional government has complete control over southern Syria except the Druze area.

== Composition ==
- Central Committees (several factions joined the Ministry of Defense by 18 February 2025)
- Daraa Tribe Council
- Horan Free Gathering
- 8th Brigade (dissolved and joined the Ministry of Defense on 13 April 2025)
- Al-Jabal Brigade (dissolved and joined the National Guard on 23 August 2025)
- Sheikh al-Karama Forces (dissolved and joined the National Guard on 23 August 2025)
- Men of Dignity (joined the National Guard on 24 August 2025)

== Leadership ==
Nassim Abu Ara, a former commander of the Free Syrian Army under the Youth of Sunna Forces, is one of the leaders that have been identified. Prior to joining the rebels at the start of the Syrian civil war, Abu Ara served as an officer in Assad's army. He was serving as a rebel commander of Youth of Sunnah Forces and later switched sides and become one of the commanders of the 8th Brigade in 2018. Abu Ara was seen by many as having collaborated with Russia and Assad. In December 2024, he was a spokesman and a commander of SOR based in Nawa.

Known as "Russia's man in Southern Syria", Ahmad al-Awda, the leader of SOR, was also the commander of the Youth of Sunna Forces. As in the case of Abu Ara, he was a member of Assad's army before joining the rebels in his region during the outbreak of civil war. He collaborated with Islamist groups in the southern parts of Syria, such as Al-Nusra Front. Al-Awda's reputation as "Russia's man" was further solidified in 2018 following the reconciliation agreement with Russia, when he was appointed as commander of the Syrian Arab Armed Forces' 5th Corps branch in the Daraa Governorate, following the recapture of territory by government forces in most of Syria. Al-Awda re-affiliated with Syrian Military Intelligence in 2021.

== See also ==
- 2024 in Syria
- Timeline of the Syrian civil war
- Fall of the Assad regime
- Suwayda Military Council
- Decisive Battle Operations Room
