= Ajami, Syria =

Ajami العجمي
- Village
- Location within Syria
- Coordinates: 32°44′10″N 35°59′8″E
- PAL: 242/238
- Country: Syria
- Governorate: Daraa Governorate
- District: Daraa District
- Nahiyah: Muzayrib

Population (2004)
  - Total: 1,646
- Time zone: UTC+3 (AST)

Ajami (Arabic: العجمي, romanized: al-ʿAjamī, also transliterated Ajamy) is a village in southern Syria, administratively part of the Daraa Governorate, located northwest of Daraa. According to the Syria Central Bureau of Statistics, Ajami had a population of 1,646 in the 2004 census. By June 2015, the population had declined to about 1,300 (of whom 900 were IDPs displaced from other settlements by the ongoing Syrian Civil War).

== History ==
The village was named, probably no earlier than the late 18th century, for the nearby maqam (mausoleum) of Shaykh Muhammad al-Ajami, a local Muslim saintly figure. The tomb was rectangular, constructed partly of stone and in a poor state when Gottlieb Schumacher visited the area in the early 1880s. The name 'Ajami' was also given to the stream, Wadi al-Ajami, which supplied the village with water, and the stream's source, the Bahret al-Ajami marsh. Schumacher described the village as having flourished at one point but by then was partly abandoned and consisting of about thirty stone or mud huts, twelve of which were still inhabited by some thirty impoverished residents. He noted a "well-arched gate of modern masonry" on the east side of Ajami, which had been the entrance to the village sheikh's garden.

== Bibliography ==
- Schumacher, Gottlieb (1886). Across the Jordan: Being an Exploration and Survey of part of Hauran and Jaulan. Bentley.
