= Madira, Syria =

Madira مديرا
- Village
- Location in Syria
- Coordinates: 33°32′38″N 36°23′10″E
- Country: Syria
- Governorate: Rif Dimashq
- District: Douma District
- Subdistrict: Harasta

Population (2004)
  - Total: 4,308
- Time zone: UTC+2 (EET)
  - Summer (DST): UTC+3 (EEST)
- City Qrya Pcode: C2343

Madira (Arabic: مديرا) is a Syrian village located in Douma District, Rif Dimashq. According to the Syria Central Bureau of Statistics (CBS), Madira had a population of 4,308 in the 2004 census.
