= Popular Defence Forces =

Popular Defence Forces may refer to:

- Popular Defence Forces (Sudan)
- Popular Defense Forces (Gaza)
