= Ahmad al-Awda =

Syrian military officer and rebel

- أحمد العودة
- Born: 1981 (age 44–45); Bosra, Daraa Governorate, Ba'athist Syria
- Military career
- Allegiance: Syrian opposition (2014–2018, 2024) Ba'athist Syria (2018–2024) Syria (2025–present)
- Branch: (Syrian opposition) Free Syrian Army (2014–2018) (Ba'athist Syria) Syrian Arab Army (2018–2024) (Syrian opposition) Southern Operations Room (2024–present)
- Unit: Youth of Sunna Forces (2014–2018) 8th Brigade (2018–2025)
- Conflicts: Syrian civil war; Daraa Governorate campaign; Battle of Bosra; Daraa insurgency; 2024 Syrian opposition offensives; Southern Syria offensive; Fall of Damascus

Ahmad al-Awda (Arabic: أحمد العودة, romanized: Aḥmad al-ʿAwdā), also spelled as Ahmad al-Oda, is a Syrian military officer and former rebel leader who leads the Southern Operations Room. A leader of the rebel Youth of Sunna Forces between 2014 and 2018, al-Awda reconciled with the Assad regime following the 2018 Southern Syria offensive. With the backing of Russia, al-Awda was appointed the commander of the 8th Brigade of the Syrian Army's 5th Corps, a formation primarily consisting of reconciled rebels. He became an influential powerbroker in Daraa Governorate, taking orders from Russia rather than the authorities in Damascus, and became known as "Russia's man in Southern Syria". He re-affiliated with Syrian Military Intelligence in 2021.

As the Syrian Army took heavy losses amid the 2024 Syrian opposition offensives, al-Awda and his forces defected back to the Syrian opposition to form the Southern Operations Room, which spearheaded the Fall of Damascus and toppled the Assad regime.

== Biography ==
=== Early life ===
Ahmad al-Awda was born in 1981 in the town of Bosra to a Sunni Muslim family. He obtained a degree in English literature and worked as a teacher before the onset of the Syrian civil war. During the war, three of his brothers were killed fighting for the Syrian opposition.

=== Youth of Sunna Forces (2014–2018) ===
After the outbreak of the Syrian civil war, al-Awda joined the Syrian opposition and led the Youth of Sunna Forces, a constituent group of the Southern Front of the Free Syrian Army. He allied with the al-Nusra Front and Islamic Muthanna Movement to successfully capture his hometown of Bosra from government forces, then expelled the groups from the town. In June 2018, government forces launched a successful offensive to recapture the entirety of Daraa Governorate. Accepting a reconciliation settlement brokered by Russia, al-Awda and the Youth of Sunna Forces surrendered in July 2018 — one of the first groups to do so — and gave up their heavy arms to the Russian Military Police. Some local residents viewed the agreement as treasonous.

Al-Awda, along with opposition figures Adham al-Akrad and Bashar al-Zoubi, met in late June 2018 with the Syrian government and a Russian representative. Al-Awda accepted the terms of a proposed settlement, which included "surrendering medium and heavy" weapons, as well as allowing Assad forces to enter the area.

=== Syrian Army (2018–2024) ===
Receiving a Russian guarantee from government retribution, al-Awda was granted command of the local branch of the Syrian Army's 5th Corps, the 8th Brigade, joining alongside other ex-rebels. The 8th Brigade took orders from Russia instead of the Syrian Ministry of Defense. The arrangement allowed Russia to secure the eastern half of Daraa Governorate, police the region with forces that maintained a level of public legitimacy and undermine Iranian influence. In September 2018, Enab Baladi reported that 400 soldiers from the 8th Brigade had been deployed to fight opposition forces in Idlib Governorate, a claim which al-Awda denied. Under Russian orders, the 8th Brigade fought near Salma and in the Syrian Desert.

As the Daraa insurgency escalated, al-Awda's 8th Brigade mediated between loyalist troops and insurgents, working with Russia to end clashes and arrange new reconciliation and deportation deals. Al-Awda also maintained a mutually beneficial relationship with Hayat Tahrir al-Sham (HTS). HTS was permitted a limited presence in areas controlled by the 8th Brigade, who in turn assassinated drug traffickers and members of Islamic State.

In July 2020, al-Awda announced his intention to unify the military forces of Suwayda, Daraa and Quneitra into a single "army" under his leadership. Soon afterwards, the 8th Brigade attacked positions belonging to Military Intelligence and the Iranian-linked Air Force Intelligence, consolidating al-Awda's control over the region. Later that month, over 1,000 8th Brigade soldiers graduated from a training course in the presence of Russian officers. Following the ceremony, the soldiers chanted against Bashar al-Assad, Iran and Hezbollah. Some locals also viewed al-Awda's forces as protecting them against Iranian influence and regime loyalists. At the funerals of 8th Brigade soldiers, demonstrators regularly called for the overthrow of Assad and the expulsion of Iranian militias.

In 2021, the brigade was transferred from the 5th Corps to Military Intelligence. Its strength was estimated to be 1,200 men in 2024.

=== Southern Operations Room (2024) ===
In late November 2024, the Syrian army rapidly lost territory after the HTS-led Military Operations Command launched a series of offensives. On 6 December 2024, the 8th Brigade re-defected to the opposition to become one of the founding groups of the Southern Operations Room (SOR), with al-Awda serving as its leader. The SOR rapidly expelled government forces from the Daraa and Quneitra governorates, before marching on Damascus and toppling the Assad regime. Al-Awda's forces secured government institutions and guarded regime officials, taking many to the Four Seasons Hotel for their protection.

=== Dissolution of the Eighth Brigade ===
The Eighth Brigade was dissolved in April 2025, following the killing of Bilal al-Droubi by members of the brigade, with Al-Awda's location being unknown at the time.

=== Assassination attempt ===
In February 2026, al-Awda said he survived an assassination attempt at his Bosra residence, blaming a Hezbollah-backed group and claiming to have evidence of their involvement. Clashes around his compound left one person dead and another injured before security forces intervened. In a video statement, he announced he was placing himself under Syrian authorities, including President Ahmed al-Sharaa and Defense Minister Murhaf Abu Qasra, to permit an investigation and prevent further bloodshed.
