= Daraa al-Balad =

- Neighborhood
- Country: Syria
- City: Daraa
- Control: Syrian transitional government

Population (September 2021)
  - Total: 50,000
- Time zone: UTC+3 (AST)

Daraa al-Balad is a neighborhood in the city of Daraa, Syria.

== Syrian civil war ==
The district was called the "epicenter" of the Syrian Civil War after the torture of young boys by the mukhabarat led to protests in the city.

The neighborhood was retaken by the Assad regime in 2018. Nonetheless, a "low-level insurgency" was waged by rebels against Iranian forces and those that reconciled with the regime.

The neighborhood was besieged by Assad-aligned forces from 6 June until 21 September 2021. Multiple rounds of negotiations were held between the Daraa Central Committee (which negotiated on behalf of the rebels) and the Security Committee (which represented the regime) from July through August.

Russian military police, along with members of the Eighth Brigade, entered the city and "unexpectedly" removed a checkpoint in August 2021 that was established to implement the siege.

A Russian-brokered ceasefire went into effect in September 2021. A "settlement agreement" was also reached that same month.
