= 9th Armoured Division (Syria) =

- Divisional tactical color marking
- Active: 1970–2024
- Country: Ba'athist Syria
- Allegiance: Syrian Arab Armed Forces
- Branch: Syrian Arab Army
- Type: Armoured division
- Role: Armoured warfare
- Part of: 1st Corps
- Garrison/HQ: Daraa
- Engagements: Yom Kippur War; Valley of Tears; Lebanese Civil War; Gulf War; Operation Desert Storm; Syrian Civil War; Idlib Governorate clashes (June 2012–April 2013); 2015 Southern Syria offensive; Daraa and As-Suwayda offensive (June 2015); Rif Dimashq Governorate campaign; Battle of Harasta (2017–2018); Rif Dimashq offensive (February–April 2018); Southern Damascus offensive (April–May 2018); As-Suwayda offensive (August–November 2018); Operation Dawn of Idlib; March 2020 Daraa clashes; 2021 Daraa offensive

Commanders
- Current commander: Maj. Gen. Hussein Ismail al-Jeddawi
- Chief of Staff: Brig. Gen. Yusha Saad al-Din
- Notable commanders: Lt. Gen. Hasan Turkmani †; Maj. Gen. Ramadan Ramadan; Maj. Gen. Ahmed Ibrahim Nayouf

The 9th Armoured Division (Arabic: الفرقة التاسعة المدرعة) was an elite division of the Syrian Arab Army, part of the 1st Army Corps and it was established in 1970.

== Command structure ==
9th Armoured Division (2022)

- 34th Armoured Brigade
- 43rd Armoured Brigade
- 701st Armoured Brigade
- 52nd Mechanized Brigade
- 467th Special Forces Regiment
- 89th Artillery Brigade

== Combat history ==
=== Yom Kippur War and Lebanon ===
The division was established in 1970, and was originally called the 9th Infantry Division, although according to its composition it was actually an armored division. In 1973 it was heavily engaged during the October War, and in the Valley of Tears. The division participated in attack on the Golan Heights at the beginning of the war. It attacked the center of the plateau, alongside the 5th Division which attacked the southern sector and the 7th Division which attacked the north.

Under the division's command were the 52nd Mechanized Brigade (with 41 tanks) in the northern part of the sector and the 33rd Mechanized Brigade (with 41 tanks) in the southern part of the sector. Behind the first tier brigades were two second tier brigades; The 43rd Armored Brigade (with 95 tanks) and the 51st Armored Brigade (with 95 tanks), which was attached to the division. The division was commanded during the war by Hasan Turkmani.

In April 1976, it was announced by Kamal Jumblatt, leader of the Lebanese National Movement, that the 91st Armoured Brigade had entered Lebanon. This was in addition to other Syrian forces that had entered previously.

=== Gulf War ===
The 9th Armored Division served in the 1991 Gulf War as the Arab Joint Forces Command North reserve and saw little action. In 2001 Richard Bennett estimated that its brigades included the 43rd and 91st Armored Brigades and the 52nd Mechanized Brigade. He wrote that it was part of the 1st Corps, which covered from Golan Heights, the fortified zone and south to Der'a near the Jordanian border.

=== Civil war ===
Since the start of the war, 9th Division was engaged in Idlib Governorate clashes (June 2012–April 2013). The 52nd Armored Brigade was reported in Der'aa in southern Syria in May 2013. 9th Division took part in the 2015 Southern Syria offensive, which resulted into stalemate. In June 2015, it was involved in Daraa and As-Suwayda offensive. The 9th Division alongside pro-government militias repelled major rebel offensive.

It was reported in October 2015 that "Syrian armed opposition factions seized the strategic Tel Ahmar in the northern countryside of Quneitra on Saturday, following violent clashes with government forces. The capture of Tel Ahmar comes days after opposition factions seized the Fourth Division of the Syrian army’s Brigade 91 in the same offensive, which aims to break the siege on Western Ghouta." Between November 2017 and January 2018, the division's units took part in battles on the outskirts of Damascus (Battle of Harasta). During August 2021, they participated in the Daraa offensive, which led to extensive occupations east and west of the city of Dara'a in favor of the Syrian government forces.
