= Louay al-Ali =

Former head of the Military Intelligence Directorate in Daraa

- لؤي العلي

Chief of Military Intelligence in Daraa
- In office 2011–2024
- Succeeded by: Office abolished

Chief of Military Intelligence in Suwayda
- In office 2019–2021
- Succeeded by: Ayman Muhammad

Personal details
- Born: 20 August 1965 (age 61)

Military service
- Allegiance: Ba'athist Syria
- Battles/wars: Syrian civil war; Daraa insurgency; March 2020 Daraa clashes
- Criminal information
- Status: Subject of arrest warrant by the Fourth Criminal Court in Damascus
- Criminal charges: Crimes against humanity Murder; Torture
- Penalty: Death (in absentia)
- Wanted by: Syria
- Wanted since: 2025

Louay al-Ali (Arabic: لؤي العلي), also transliterated Lwai al-Ali, (born 20 August 1965) is a Syrian former intelligence officer who served as the head of the Military Intelligence Directorate in Daraa Governorate until 2024 and as the head of the Military Intelligence Directorate in Suwayda Governorate from 2019 until 2021.

== Career ==
Al-Ali initially was a member of military security in Nawa, serving as a second lieutenant. He was promoted to captain and transferred to the military security section in Izra and became a lieutenant colonel and transferred to Al-Sanamayn. He was promoted to the position of colonel in 2011 and became the head of the Daraa Military Security Branch that same year. He was implicated for his role suppressing anti government protesters in the Siege of Daraa.

Following clashes that took place in 2022 between the Raji Falhout group and "local factions", which resulted in the dissolution of the group, al-Ali no longer managed the "Suweida issue" and focused on Branch 265 in Daraa Governorate.

Another escalation in Suwayda took place following the detention of a teenager from the governorate, who was detained in Homs. Sheikh Hikmat al-Hijri intervened on his behalf and al-Ali insulted al-Hijri and the Druze in response.

Imad Abu Zureiq and other reconciled rebels, including Ali al-Miqdad and Moayad al-Aqra, worked under al-Ali.

He was closely involved in drug trafficking.

Al-Ali left Daraa for Damascus in December 2024, reportedly with the assistance of Abu Zureiq, after southern rebels took control of Daraa city in the 2024 Southern Syria offensive.

== Sanctions and legal proceedings ==
The European Union sanctioned him on 29 May 2020.

On 11 August 2026, a Syrian court sentenced al-Ali to death in absentia as part of a ruling against several former regime officials.
