= Popular Resistance (Daraa) =

Insurgent group in Daraa Syria

- مقاومة شعبية al-Muqawama al-Shabia
- logo
- Leader: unknown
- Spokesperson: Saif al-Horani
- Dates active: November 2018–2020
- Active regions: Daraa Governorate, Syria
- Status: inactive
- Wars: the Syrian Civil War

The Popular Resistance (Arabic: مقاومة شعبية; al-Muqawama al-Shabia) was an insurgent group that operated in Daraa Governorate. The group announced itself publicly in November of 2018. Its spokesperson Saif al-Hourani described Popular Resistance as "an extension of the Syrian revolution that has never separated from it." Popular Resistance's stated goal is to topple the government and expel pro-government militias from the country. The group, composed mainly of former Free Syrian Army fighters and men facing military conscription, has waged an insurgency against the Syrian Army and intelligence agencies, Iranian-backed militias, and reconciled rebel fighters working with the Syrian government. The group carried out guerrilla-style attacks on government positions such as checkpoints, and targets officials and soldiers in assassinations.
