= Youth of Sunna Forces =

Syrian armed group

- قوى شباب السنة; Quwaa Shabaab al-Sunnah
- Leaders: First faction: Mohammad Tohme; Bilal al-Droubi; Capt. Ziad Abbas; Second faction: General commander Ahmad al-Awda; Col. Nassim Abu Ezza
- Dates active: 2012–2018
- Headquarters: Bosra, Daraa Governorate
- Active regions: Daraa Governorate; Quneitra Governorate
- Part of: (Syrian opposition) Free Syrian Army: Southern Front
- Wars: the Syrian civil war

The Youth of Sunna Forces or Sunni Youth Forces, formerly the Youth of Sunna Division and the Youth of Sunna Brigade, was a Syrian rebel group affiliated with the Free Syrian Army's Southern Front that was armed with U.S.-made BGM-71 TOW anti-tank missiles. It operated in the Daraa and Quneitra Governorates until it surrendered and later joined the Syrian Arab Army in 2018.

== History ==
On 2 August 2016, fighters from the Youth of Sunna Forces raided the house of its deputy leader Mohammad Tohme and proceeded to beat his father and shot his brother. In response, the next day Tohme loyalists stormed their headquarters in Bosra and deposed Ahmad al-Awda, the leader of the group. al-Awda and his followers fled and was subsequently placed under house arrest, while the military council handed over the group's command to Tohme and his deputy, Bilal al-Droubi. Some rebel supporters called this a coup d'etat while others declared their support and defended the toppling of corrupt leaders.

On 22 August 2016, additional Southern Front factions joined the Youth of Sunna Division under the new leadership of Colonel Nassim Abu Ezza.

In 2018 after a major rebel defeat in southern Syria, the group surrendered to government forces and later joined the SAA as part of the Eighth Brigade of the 5th Corps, supporting an offensive against the ISIS affiliate Khalid ibn al-Walid Army in July 2018.

== Groups ==
- Hamza Brigade
- Zaidi Cavalry Division
- Houran Brigade
- Caliph Umar ibn Abd al-Aziz Brigade
- Spears of Alwali Brigade
- Martyr Yousef the Great Brigade
- Martyr Ahmed al-Khalaf Brigade
- Zaidi Knights Brigade
- Shield of Lajat Brigade
- Abu Saddam Brigade
- Martyr Ahmed al-Miqdad
- Banner of the Martyrs of Bosra
- Martyr Abdul Razzaq Azaaba Brigade
- Martyr Zuhair al-Zoubi Brigade
- Martyr Akhawsh Brigade
- Descendants of Ali Brigade
- Martyr Obeida Alissa Brigade
- Medical Battalion
- Mujahideen Houran
- Inkhil Martyrs Brigade

== War crimes ==
On 28 February 2016, the diplomat for the town of Abtaa, Colonel Zidan Nsierat, was disappeared into a prison in Bosra held by the Youth of Sunna Brigade. Three days later, he was tortured to death in the prison, and the group refused to hand over his corpse to his family. Similar incidents of deaths due to prisoner abuse by the Youth of Sunna was reported in the town.

== See also ==
- List of armed groups in the Syrian Civil War
