= Army of the Revolution =

Syrian rebel alliance

- Arabic: جيش الثورة; Jaysh al-Thawra
- The flag has three stripes. It is green, white, and black with three red stars in the center.
- Leaders: Ahmed Ibrahim al-Qasim (overall commander since December 2017, Mu'tazz Billah Army commander); Suleiman al-Sharif (Abu Kanan) (overall commander until December 2017); Capt. Iyad Qadr (former overall commander and Muhajireen and Ansar Brigade commander); Lt. Col. Mohammed Hassan Salama (Dawn of Islam Division commander); Capt. Bara Nabulsi (Mu'tazz Billah Army commander, since September 2017); Omar Sharif (infantry commander); Abu Ali Mustafa (anti-armour unit commander); Firas Abu Hamza (artillery unit commander); Abu Bakr al-Hasan (official spokesman); Col. Khalid Nabulsi (Mu'tazz Billah Army commander, until September 2017); Abdullah al-Sharif † (engineering battalion commander); Shaher al-Zubani † (Martyr Walid Qaisi Brigade commander); Maher al-Masri (Abu Hudhayfah al-Shami) † (Yarmouk Army commander)
- Dates active: 4 December 2016 – 31 July 2018
- Active regions: Daraa Governorate; Quneitra Governorate
- Size: 7,500+ fighters
- Part of: (Syrian opposition) Free Syrian Army: Southern Front
- Wars: the Syrian Civil War
- Website: https://twitter.com/althawraarmy?lang=en

The Army of the Revolution (Arabic: جيش الثورة; Jaysh al-Thawrā) was a Syrian rebel alliance affiliated with the Southern Front of the Free Syrian Army. It was composed of five FSA factions which mainly operated in the Daraa Governorate in southwestern Syria. One of its commanders stated that the group is a "temporary operations room" due to the separation between western and eastern Daraa, and that the "door is open" for other groups to join the alliance.

== Member groups ==
- Yarmouk Army
  - United Sham Front
- Mu'tazz Billah Army
  - Martyr Walid Qaisi Brigade
- Muhajireen and Ansar Brigade
- Hasan ibn Ali Brigade
- Dawn of Islam Division
- Firqat Ahrar Nawa
  - Free Nawa Brigade
  - Bani Umayya Brigade
  - Farouq Brigade
  - Omar Mukhtar Brigade
  - Southern Company
  - Gaza Houran Brigade
  - Clear Victory Brigade
  - Muhammad the Conqueror Brigade
  - Soldiers of Islam Brigade
  - Martyr Ahmad al-Awad Brigade
  - Omar ibn al-Khattab Brigade
  - Lions of the South Brigade
  - Technical Battalion

=== Yarmouk Army ===
The Yarmouk Army (Arabic: جيش اليرموك; transliteration: Jaysh al-Yarmouk), originally known as the Yarmouk Brigade, is a prominent FSA rebel group operating in the Quneitra and Daraa governorates. The group is one of the units that has received BGM-71 TOW missiles. It joined the Southern Front on 14 February 2014 and the Hawks of the South coalition on 27 December 2014.

The Yarmouk Army was described by Reuters in 2014 as "one of the strongest groups in the south."

The group participated in the Battle of Nasib Border Crossing in April 2015, where the Syrian rebels took control of it.

The group took part in the Daraa and As-Suwayda offensive (June 2015).

In January 2016, the United Sham Front joined the group.

The group clashed with the Youth of Sunna Forces in June 2017.

=== Mu'tazz Billah Army ===
The Mu'tazz Billah Army (Arabic: جيش المعتز بالله; transliteration: Jaysh al-Mu'tazz Billah), formerly called the Mu'tazz Billah Brigade (Arabic: لواء المعتز بالله; transliteration: Liwa al-Mu'tazz Billah), named after al-Mu'tazz, is a FSA group active in Daraa. It also received TOW missiles from the Military Operations Center based in Jordan. The group has clashed with the Islamic Muthanna Movement. It was also previously part of the Daraa Military Council.

On 11 September 2017, Captain Bara Nabulsi was appointed as the general commander of the Mu'tazz Billah Army, replacing Colonel Khalid Nabulsi. Col. Nabulsi was previously the commander of the Southern Front's joint command operations room in 2014.

=== Muhajireen and Ansar Brigade ===
The Emigrants and Helpers Brigade (Arabic: لواء المهاجرون والأنصار; transliteration: Liwa al-Muhajireen wal-Ansar) was one of the earliest FSA groups formed in the Daraa Governorate. The group is affiliated with the Supreme Military Council and has received TOW and HJ-8 anti-tank missiles. It is one of the members of the Daraa Military Council. The group is led by Captain Iyad Khaddour and Khalid Fathallah, the former of which became the overall commander of the Army of the Revolution.

=== Dawn of Islam Division ===
The Dawn of Islam Division (Arabic: فرقة فجر الإسلام; transliteration: Firqat Fajr al-Islam) is a Syrian rebel group operating in the Uthman and Tafas districts of Daraa city as well as in Busra al-Harir in the north-east of Daraa Governorate. Formed in February 2013, the group is led by Lieutenant Colonel Mohammed Hassan Salama. It is a merger between the Dawn of Islam Brigade and a number of smaller rebel groups. The group also received BGM-71 TOW anti-tank missiles. On 13 April 2015, the Dawn of Islam Division joined a number of other Southern Front groups in renouncing all ties with the al-Nusra Front. On 3 June 2017, it joined the Army of the Revolution.

== History ==
Following the surrender and integration of some former rebels into government-allied structures (like the Russian-formed 5th Legion or Military Security Branch), former commanders of the Army of the Revolution were targets of assassination attempts and killings by unknown persons in the volatile post-reconciliation Daraa environment. Commander Mahmoud al-Bardan was the target of an assassination attempt in February 2019, and former member Yousef Mohammad al-Hashish was shot and killed in December
