= Eighth Brigade (Syria) =

Syrian armed group

- اللواء الثامن
- Leader: Ahmad al-Awda
- Spokesperson: Mohammed al-Hourani
- Dates active: 2018–2025
- Headquarters: Bosra, Syria
- Active regions: Daraa Governorate, Syria; As-Suwayda Governorate, Syria
- Size: ~1,500 as of June 2020
- Part of: 5th Corps (until 2024); Southern Operations Room (2024–2025)
- Wars: Syrian Civil War; Syrian conflict (2024–present)

The Eighth Brigade was a unit of the 5th Corps established in 2018 in the Daraa Governorate, Syria during the Syrian civil war, composed primarily of rebels who had reconciled with the Assad regime in 2018. The faction joined the Southern Operations Room in December 2024 following the 2024 Syrian opposition offensives and disbanded in April 2025 after the killing of Bilal al-Droubi.

== Background ==
The Eighth Brigade originated as the Syrian rebel group Youth of Sunna Forces, which was initially led by Ahmad al-Awda until Mohammed Tohme and his deputy Bilal al-Droubi were given control of the group by the factions' leadership council in August 2016. Al-Awda regained control of the group and the city of Bosra later that month with the support of the Yarmouk Army.

== History ==
Following a marked increase in regime activity in the summer of 2018, al-Awda negotiated a settlement with Russia and was given control of his own brigade. The faction worked closely with Russian military police and their joint area of control was more peaceful compared to other areas of the governorate.

Disputes over the control of agricultural land led to the brigade fighting against various Druze groups, including Sheikh al-Karama Forces, Al-Fahd Forces, Kata'ib Humat al-Diyar, Ma’an Zahreddin group, Karem Ubaid group, and Usoud al-Jabal group, in addition to the National Defence Forces (NDF), in September 2020 in Al-Mujaymer, as well as the "outskirts" of Al-Qurayya. 14 were killed, with 62 injured, on both sides. Members of the Men of Dignity were also injured in the clashes. The NDF established outposts in the aftermath of the clashes, on 4 October 2020. The Eighth Brigade withdrew from the area the following month, after negotiations held by emir Louay al-Atrash, as well as sheikhs Hammoud al-Hinnawi and Awad al-Miqdad.

The group clashed in Sayda in October 2020 with the Military Intelligence Directorate. Residents of "Sayda, al-Nai’ma" and Kahil, where settlements were reached in October 2021, requested that the Security Committee "disarm" those who were affiliated with the brigade. Russian military police met with Ali Bash, the deputy commander of the organization, on 11 October in Bosra, though the Eighth Brigade refused to hand over their weapons. The Eighth Brigade clashed various times with the Air Force Intelligence Directorate, including a raid on a Khirbet Ghazaleh checkpoint in December 2021 which was held by the directorate. Russia ended support for the group in 2021 and it affiliated with the Military Intelligence branch in Suwayda.

The group met residents of Al-Karak and the Security Committee, headed by Hossam Louka, in November 2020 and participated in a "raid and search campaign."

The Eighth Brigade raided a group on 5 May 2022 that was planning assassinations of Syrian Brigade Party members, under the orders of the Air Force Intelligence Directorate.

The Eighth Brigade and Central Committees were engaged in a 10-day operation against ISIS in the city of Jasim in October 2022. The next month, the brigade was involved in "fierce battles" with ISIS in various Daraa neighborhoods, including Tariq al-Sad and al-Mukhayam, alongside allied "local factions."

The Eighth Brigade fought against the Moid al-Masalmah group in November 2022, which was claimed to have ties to ISIS. A citizen journalist group named the Horan Free League indicated that Louay al-Ali, the local head of the Military Intelligence Directorate, allowed ISIS into the area. The brigade was allied with former members of the Central Committees.

The Eighth Brigade and local groups clashed with ISIS in Nawa in January 2024, killing eight members of ISIS.

It fought against a Air Force Intelligence-affiliated group in Al-Musayfirah in March 2024, after an assassination attempt was made on a member of the Eighth Brigade. Two members of the Eighth Brigade died in the clashes, with three injured. One member of Air Force Intelligence died, while seven were injured. After the Air Force Intelligence-affiliated group was driven out of the city and fled to Umm Walad, locals formed an armed group and allied themselves with the Eighth Brigade. Clashes between the two groups also occurred later in the year, in September. The Eighth Brigade deployed reinforcements from Bosra.

The brigade joined the Southern Operations Room in December 2024, affiliated with the Syrian opposition and was one of the factions that marched on Damascus, leading to its fall that month.

=== Dissolution ===
On 10 April 2025, members of the brigade confronted Bilal al-Droubi, who had recently joined the Ministry of Defense, arresting him and shooting him multiple times. Al-Droubi died two days later.

On 11 April, following the attack on al-Droubi, large reinforcements from General Security were sent towards Eighth Brigade positions in eastern Daraa, taking control of checkpoints and confiscating weapons in Al-Sahwah, Al-Musayfirah, Saida, Al-Hirak, Ghabagheb, and Khirbet Ghazaleh. Later, Daraa governor Anwar al-Zoubi and other regional Syrian officials negotiated with Eighth Brigade leaders and local dignitaries in Bosra Citadel, reaching an agreement to hand over individuals wanted in killing al-Droubi.

On 12 April, General Security convoys carrying 1,200 soldiers entered the brigade's headquarters in Bosra to search for weapon depots and to transfer prisoners to Daraa city. An anonymous Eighth Brigade commander said that al-Awda considered fighting against the government, but decided against it because it would be a "losing battle". Additionally, hundreds of demonstrators demonstrated against the Eighth Brigade in Bosra, and mosque loudspeakers in several towns in eastern Daraa broadcast calls for pressuring brigade leaders into handing over those responsible for al-Droubi's death and for brigade members to hand in their weapons.

On 13 April 2025, Eighth Brigade spokesperson Lieutenant Colonel Mohammed al-Hourani issued a statement announcing the dissolution of the Eighth Brigade, adding that it would hand over all "human and military capabilities" to the Ministry of Defense. Following this, General Security confiscated the brigade's heavy equipment, which included tanks, armored personnel carriers, and anti-tank weapons, from their headquarters in Bosra, and took control of facilities and prisons formerly run by the brigade.
