= 5th Assault Corps (Syria) =

- فيلق الهجوم الخامس
- Syrian Armed Forces Flag
- Active: 2016– 2024
- Country: Ba'athist Syria
- Allegiance: Syrian Armed Forces
- Branch: Syrian Arab Army
- Type: Corps
- Size: 15,000 soldiers (2019)
- Garrison/HQ: Latakia; Homs (1st Brigade); Hama (2nd Brigade); Daraa (3rd, 4th & al-Quds Brigade); Maarat al-Numan (5th & 6th Brigade); Deir ez-Zor (7th Brigade); Bosra (8th Brigade); Ayn Issa (103rd & 148th Brigade)
- Engagements: Syrian Civil War

Commanders
- Current Commander: Maj. Gen. Omran Mahmoud Omran
- Deputy Commander: Maj. Gen. Novikov Boris Alekseevich
- Brigade Commanders: Brig. Gen. Burhan Al-Halabi (1st Brigade); Brig. Gen. Najim Muna (2nd Brigade); Brig. Gen. Aktham Hussain (3rd Brigade); Brig. Gen. Ahmed Saleh Al Dhamati (4th Brigade); Brig. Gen. Khaiyrat Kuhlh (5th Brigade); Brig. Gen. Ali Ali (6th Brigade) †; Brig. Gen. Nabil Issa (7th Brigade); Ahmad al-Awda (8th Brigade); Col. Muhammad al-Sa'eed (al-Quds Brigade); Brig. Gen. Yasser Saleh Mansour (148th Brigade)

The 5th Assault Corps (Arabic: فيلق الهجوم الخامس), also called the Fifth Legion, was an all-volunteer corps, formation of the Syrian Army involved in the Syrian Civil War fighting against the Syrian opposition, Tahrir al-Sham, Al-Qaeda in Syria, and ISIS. It was first formed in 2016. Unlike other corps in the Syrian Army, the 5th Corps was not divided into divisions, but commanded eleven brigades, while the actual number of serving soldiers was lower (about a third of the manpower in other corps).

== Command structure ==
5th Assault Corps (2021)

- 1st Assault Brigade
  - 13th Infantry Battalion
  - 1579th Infantry Battalion
- 2nd Assault Brigade
- 3rd Assault Brigade
  - 103rd Battalion
- 4th Assault Brigade
  - Ba'ath Battalion
- 5th Assault Brigade
  - 1st Infantry Regiment
  - 2nd Infantry Regiment

- 6th Assault Brigade
  - 79th Infantry Battalion
  - 86th Infantry Battalion
- 7th Assault Brigade
  - 3rd Infantry Battalion
- 8th Assault Brigade
- al-Quds Brigade
  - Lions of al-Quds Battalion
  - Defenders of Aleppo Battalion
  - Deterrence Battalion
  - Lions of al-Shahba Battalion
- 103rd Artillery Brigade
- 148th Artillery Brigade
- ISIS Hunters

== History ==
The formation of the 5th Corps in 2016 was preceded by the creation of the 4th Volunteer Assault Corps, which did not live up to expectations, whose sphere remained the local defense of Latakia. The Fifth Corps of volunteered recruited men from over age 18 from across the country "not already eligible for military service or deserters". The Russians took an active part in preparing and equipping the corps.

The 5th Volunteer Assault Corps was formed entirely from contract soldiers from scratch. Russian officers participated in the command of the formation, ranging from company to the corps commander. Russian signal officers provided communications between units and corps headquarters. The corps was commanded by a Syrian, his Russian deputy usually remained in the shadows. 5th Corps soldiers were trained, equipped and advised by Russian military personnel since their intervention in 2015. Most main battle tanks of the 5th Assault Corps were modernized Soviet tanks, including the T-62M and T-72B3.

According to Abdullah Soleiman Ali in al-Safir paper, the formation of "Fifth Attack Troop Corps" was the apex point of cooperation among members of the Russia–Syria–Iran–Iraq coalition. The corps was commanded by Lieutenant General Valery Asapov until his death in Deir ez-Zor on 23 September 2017.

The 5th Corps unit, The Ba'ath Legion, was formed from Ba'ath Brigades volunteers. It was later transformed into the 4th Brigade. According to the Russian International Affairs Council, the Qalamoun Shield Forces also joined the Fifth Corps, though no other sources confirmed this. In February 2018, 20 members of the ISIS Hunters (a 5th Corps subunit) died in a US airstrike.

After the rebels surrendered in July 2018 in Daraa, they were integrated into the 5th Corps from October 2018 as the 8th Brigade with a permanent location in Bosra, its commander was the former rebel Ahmad al-Awda, who previously commanded the Youth of Sunna Forces group. The majority of the rebels (the total number of forces of the Southern Front FSA was 30,000 people) chose to evacuate to the province of Idlib (about 5,000 people) or return to peaceful life. By April 2019, former rebels made up more than 75% of the brigade's fighters. As of April 2019, the strength of the 8th Brigade was 1,585 military personnel.

The 8th Brigade was unique in that it consisted entirely of natives of the province Daraa. The brigade's personnel were made up of three categories: ordinary civilians (300 people), mainly engaged in maintenance; civil servants who had previously participated in the rebellion against the government and joined the brigade in order to avoid criminal prosecution, since they had previously worked for the rebels; the rebels themselves were from the Youth of Sunna Forces (about 860 fighters). The 8th Brigade participated in operations against IS in the desert Suwayda, Latakia and Deir ez-Zor. The brigade consisted of 4 infantry battalions, a reconnaissance company, a fire support company, a logistics company support and headquarters.

In March 2021, its commander since January 2018, Major General Zaid Salah (formerly the commander of the Republican Guard’s 30th Division) was sanctioned by the United Kingdom, who named him as "Responsible for the violent repression of the civilian population by troops under his command, particularly during the increased violence of the Idlib/Hama offensive which began in April 2019." Later that year, the Russians discontinued support for the group and it became part of Military Intelligence.

== Combat history ==
In March 2021, the 5th Corps unit, supported by the Russians, managed to control Tuenan gas plant and Al-Thawrah oilfield in Raqqa Governorate, previously held by Liwa Fatemiyoun.

== Leadership changes ==
In July 2020, Maj. Gen. Milad Jadid replaced Maj. Gen. Zaid Salah as commander of the 5th Corps. In August 2022, Maj. Gen. Munzar Ibrahim was appointed as commander of the 5th Corps. On 30 December 2023, Maj. Gen. Muhammad al-Daher was named as a commander of the 5th Assault Corps. On 3 April 2024, Maj. Gen. Omran Mahmoud Omran was appointed as a commander of the 5th Assault Corps.

== See also ==
- Russian intervention in the Syrian Civil War
