= General Intelligence Service (Syria) =

Syrian intelligence agency

- جهاز المخابرات العامة; Jihāz al-Mukhābarāt al-‘Āmmā
- Emblem of Syria

Agency overview
- Formed: 1945; 81 years ago (DGS 1945–1958) (GIS 1958–1961) (ISFC 1961–1971) (GID 1971–2024); December 26, 2024; 21 months ago (GIS)
- Preceding agencies: General Intelligence Directorate; National Security Bureau; Political Security Directorate; Military Intelligence Directorate
- Type: Intelligence agency
- Jurisdiction: Government of Syria
- Headquarters: Damascus, Syria
- Employees: Classified
- Annual budget: Classified
- Agency executive: Abdul Qader Tahan, Director
- Parent agency: Ministry of Interior

The General Intelligence Service (Arabic: جهاز المخابرات العامة Jihāz al-Mukhābarāt al-‘Āmmā), also known as the General Intelligence Agency is the national intelligence agency of Syria, responsible for providing national security intelligence, both domestically and internationally. It was established on 26 December 2024 by the Syrian transitional government, succeeding the Ba'athist regime's General Intelligence Directorate.

== History ==
=== 1945–1958 ===
As a consequence of the French Mandate of Syria that created the modern First Syrian Republic and its structures, the country's civil intelligence services owe much to the French template which shaped their early development since 1945. Civilian intelligence service called Department of General Security (Sûreté Générale) was established, and became one of the two security agencies of Syria, the other being Deuxième Bureau. After 1949 Syrian coup d'état, the Sûreté Générale became no more than an executive arm of the Deuxième Bureau. With the tenure of Abd al-Hamid Sarraj as director of the Deuxième Bureau, which lasted from 1954 to 1958, exemplified these trends. His officers became increasingly active in both Lebanon and northern Israel.

=== 1958–1963 ===
In February 1958, the Syrian government merged with Egypt to form the United Arab Republic (UAR). The union lasted until September 1961. During that union, Syrian intelligence services came under the overall authority of the Egyptian Directorate of General Intelligence with Salah Nasr as director. After its secession from the UAR in 1961, the new Syrian government under President Nazim al-Qudsi reformed security sector. The Deuxième Bureau and a reformed civilian intelligence, renamed as the Internal Security Forces Command (ISFC), started their activities in Lebanon. On 15 December 1961, Col. Muhammad Hisham al-Samman was appointed as Commander of Internal Security Forces, assisted by a Committee under his presidency. Along with the Kuzbari government, he pledged to establish political liberties and to disestablish emergency laws, which never came into existence. With the 1963 Syrian coup d'état, the security services adapted to the new political system of the Ba'ath Party. It was intensively trained by the Egyptian State Security on its domestic affairs such as political repression, mass surveillance, coercive interrogation techniques among others.

=== 1963–1971 ===
The renewed service was used in April 1964 to crackdown uprisings in Hama led by the Syrian Muslim Brotherhood and backed by Egypt. On 24 March 1965, Decree No. 67 put the ISFC into a military framework with link to the Interior Ministry, thus ending the civilian control. After the February 1966 coup within the Ba'ath Party, Salah Jadid emerged as the leader of Syria's most radical regime to date. Jadid centralized control of all intelligence and security services under Col. Abd al-Karim al-Jundi, the head of the National Security Bureau of the Ba'ath Party. From 1966 to 1969, Jundi further expanded the role and power of the Syrian agencies, both at home and abroad. It was during this period that their reputation for brutal ruthlessness was firmly established. Also in this period, the ISFC was organized and extensively trained by the GDR's Stasi. The use of Palestinian guerrillas against Israel was core of its foreign intelligence.

=== 1971–2024 ===
In November 1970, Hafez al-Assad ousted Jadid in what he labelled a Corrective Movement. The new system has proved to be Syria's most stable and durable since independence and has toned down the previous radicalism. It was established in 1971. By 1972, the General Intelligence Directorate was significantly modelled on the GDR's Stasi. Under the government of Hafez al-Assad and Ba'ath Party, especially from 1973, agents of Syria’s GSD were frequent visitors in East Berlin for training. According to Stasi files, the Syrians also received equipment and materials from East Germany, the last such deliveries were documented up until 1990.

Under Bashar al-Assad there has been a remarkable continuity among the senior personnel in the intelligence community. The service was in competition with Political Security Directorate in the late 20th century. Major General Ghazi Kanaan possibly headed international security of the General Security Directorate in the late 20th century. In the late 20th century, between 1998 and 2001, Major General Ali Houri was director of General Security Directorate.

After Bashar al-Assad's takeover in 2000, Major General Ali Hammoud was named as head of General Intelligence Directorate. In 2001, Hisham Ikhtiyar became the head of the General Intelligence Directorate, replacing Ali Hammoud, who became the Minister for Interior. Hisham Ikhtiyar was close to Bashar al-Assad's deceased brother-in-law Assef Shawkat. President Bashar al-Assad in June 2005 appointed General Ali Mamlouk as commander of the General Intelligence Directorate.

Six years later in April 2011, the US government imposed sanctions on Ali Mamlouk, saying he had been responsible for human rights abuses, including the use of violence against civilians. Agency had repressed internal dissent, monitored individual citizens, and had been involved in the Syrian government's actions in Daraa, where protesters were killed by Syrian security services. The next month, the European Union also imposed sanctions on Ali Mamlouk, saying he had been involved in efforts to suppress anti-government protesters. A Sunni, he is said to be on good terms with all of Syria's intelligence agencies – the heads of Air Force Intelligence Directorate and the Political Security Directorate were once his assistants. He is a part of Bashar al-Assad's inner circle. After the 18 July 2012 bombing of the Central Crisis Management Cell (Syria) and the death of its four key members of team, Mohammed Dib Zaitoun was named as head of the General Intelligence Directorate.

The General Intelligence Directorate was dissolved along with the Ba'athist Syrian institutions in December 2024 following the collapse of the Assad regime. Anas Khattab, the appointed head of Syrian intelligence said that the country's security institutions will be restructured after all current security entities are dissolved.

=== 2024 ===
The General Intelligence Service was established on 26 December 2024 by the Syrian caretaker government as the successor agency to the GID, with Anas Khattab appointed as the director; after the establishment of the Syrian transitional government on 29 March 2025, he was later succeeded by Hussein al-Salama, whom served as its director until 19 July 2026, when he was succeeded by Abdul Qader Tahan .

== Structure ==
The General Intelligence Service operates under the primary jurisdiction of the Ministry of Interior and coordinates directly with the National Security Office. The agency is headed by the Director of General Intelligence appointed by executive decree, who is directly accountable to both the Minister of Interior and the President of Syria.

Operationally, the service functions through two primary administrative arms:

- Internal Security Directorate: Manages domestic counter-intelligence, public security monitoring, and state infrastructure protection through a network of regional offices across Syria's governorates.
- Foreign Intelligence Directorate: Responsible for foreign intelligence collection, strategic geopolitical analysis, and counter-espionage operations abroad.

=== Functions ===
- Foreign Intelligence: The agency collects political and military information from abroad to help top government leaders make key foreign policy decisions.
- Counter-Intelligence and Domestic Security: The agency is responsible to the state for detecting and neutralizing foreign espionage, illegal covert operations, and intelligence threats within Syrian territory, while protecting key government infrastructure and national communications.
- Counter-Terrorism and State Reporting: The service actively monitors and neutralizes extremist networks and unauthorized armed groups to preserve internal order, providing routine security briefings and reports directly to the President and the Minister of Interior.

== Recruitment and training ==
GIS recruits through direct civilian hiring and transfers from existing security bodies. Candidates go through security background checks and interviews before induction. The service mainly hires university graduates in fields like computer science, foreign languages, international relations, and data analysis. Selected recruits undergo training in basic tradecraft, data analysis, and operational security before field deployment.

== List of directors of the General Intelligence Service ==
=== Second Syrian Republic & United Arab Republic (1950–1958, 1958–1961) ===
- Salah Nasr (1958–1961)

=== United Arab Republic & Ba'athist Syria (1958–1961, 1963–2024) ===
- Muhammad Hisham al-Samman (1961–1963)
- Abd al-Karim al-Jundi (1966–1969)
- Adnan Babagh (1971–?)
- Ali Madani (1970s)
- Nazih Zirayr (?–1983)
- Fu'ad Absi (1983–1987)
- Majid Sa'id (1987–1994)

- Internal branch: Mohammed Nasif Kheirbek (1963–1999)

- Bashir an-Najjar (1994–1998)
- Ali Houri (1998–2001)

- Deputy Director: Mohammed Nasif Kheirbek (1999–June 2005)
- Internal branch (251): Bahjat Suleiman (1999–June 2005)
- External branch: Ayyad Mahmud (1999–?)

- Ali Hammoud (October–December 2001)
- Hisham Ikhtiyar (December 2001–June 2005)
- Ali Mamlouk (June 2005 – 2010), the European Union sanctioned him for "violence against demonstrators during the Syrian uprising".

- Deputy Director: Hassan Khallouf (?–June 2004)
- Deputy Director: Mohammed Dib Zaitoun (June 2004–2009)
- Internal branch (251): Fouad Nasif Kheirbek (June 2005–2011)
- Investigations branch: Anwar Raslan (2008–?)
- Deputy Director: Jamil Hassan (2004–1 July 2009)
- Information branch: Zouheir Hamad (?–July 2010)

- Zouheir Hamad (July 2010–July 2012), the European Union sanctioned him for "the use of violence across Syria and for intimidation and torture of protesters during the Syrian civil war".

- Deputy Director: General Nazih (July 2010–July 2012), the European Union sanctioned him for "being responsible for the use of violence across Syria and intimidation and torture of protestors during the Syrian uprising".
- Information branch: Ghassan Khalil (July 2010–?), the European Union sanctioned him for "being involved in repression and violence against the civilian population in Syria during the Syrian uprising".

- Mohammed Dib Zaitoun (25 July 2012 – 7 July 2019)

- Deputy Director: Zouheir Hamad (25 July 2012 – 7 July 2019)
- Internal branch (251): Tawfiq Younes (2011-2016), the European Union sanctioned him for "being involved in violence against demonstrators during the Syrian uprisings".

- Hossam Louka (7 July 2019 – 8 December 2024)

- Deputy Director: Akram Ali Muhammad (7 July 2019 – 2021)
- Internal branch (251): Ahmed Al-Dib (2016 – 8 December 2024)

=== Syrian caretaker & transitional governments (2024–2025, 2025–present) ===
- Anas Khattab (26 December 2024 – 3 May 2025)
- Hussein al-Salama (3 May 2025 – 19 July 2026)
- Abdul Qader Tahan (19 July 2026–present)
