= Prosecution of Syrian civil war criminals =

Human toll of the Syrian civil war
- Pre-war population 22 ±.5; Internally displaced 6 ±.5, Refugees 5.5 ±.5, Fatalities 0.5 ±.1 (millions)

Syrian refugees
- By country: Turkey, Lebanon, Egypt, Jordan
- Settlements: Camps: Jordan

Internally displaced Syrians

Casualties of the war
- Crimes: War crimes, massacres, rape

International and national courts outside Syria have begun the prosecution of Syrian civil war criminals. War crimes perpetrated by the Syrian government under Bashar Al-Assad or rebel groups include extermination, murder, rape or other forms of sexual violence, torture and imprisonment. (Note: reports include:) "[A]ccountability for serious violations of international humanitarian law and human rights is central to achieving and maintaining durable peace in Syria", stated UN Under-Secretary-General Rosemary DiCarlo.

The first war crimes trial related to the Syrian civil war concluded on 12 July 2016 in Germany. It was the case of Aria L. (Note: A German national, who has been a committed member of the Islamist and Salafist groups, murdered members of Syrian military personnel and in two of these cases produced his own picture with severed heads) performed under the Völkerstrafgesetzbuch (Code of Crimes against International Law (CCAIL)). As of December 2024, the evidence collection and cooperation with prosecutors by the Independent International Commission of Inquiry on the Syrian Arab Republic (COI) had led to 50 convictions for war crimes and crimes against humanity during the Syrian civil war.

In 2026, the Syrian transitional government began holding trials for regime officials including Atef Najib and Amjad Youssef.

== Background ==
According to three international lawyers, Syrian government officials were expected to risk facing war crimes charges in the light of a huge cache of evidence smuggled out of the country showing the "systematic killing" of about 11,000 detainees, constituting the 2014 Syrian detainee report. Most of the victims were young men and many corpses were emaciated, bloodstained and bore signs of torture. Some had no eyes; others showed signs of strangulation or electrocution. Experts said this evidence was more detailed and on a far larger scale than anything else that had emerged from the then 34-month crisis.

The United Nations (UN) summarised the human rights situation by stating that "siege warfare is employed in a context of egregious human rights and international humanitarian law violations. The warring parties do not fear being held accountable for their acts." Armed forces of both sides of the conflict blocked access of humanitarian convoys, confiscated food, cut off water supplies and targeted farmers working their fields. The report pointed to four places besieged by the government forces: Muadamiyah, Daraya, Yarmouk camp and Old City of Homs, as well as two areas under siege of rebel groups: Aleppo and Hama. In Yarmouk Camp 20,000 residents are facing death by starvation due to blockade by the Syrian government forces and fighting between the army and Jabhat al-Nusra, which prevents food distribution by UNRWA. In July 2015, the UN quietly removed Yarmouk from its list of besieged areas in Syria, despite not having been able deliver aid there for four months, and declined to explain why it had done so.

Forces of the Islamic State (IS) militant group have been accused by the UN of using public executions, amputations, and lashings in a campaign to instill fear. "Forces of the Islamic State of Iraq and al-Sham have committed torture, murder, acts tantamount to enforced disappearance and forced displacement as part of attacks on the civilian population in Aleppo and Raqqa governorates, amounting to crimes against humanity", said the report from 27 August 2014.

Enforced disappearances and arbitrary detentions have also been a feature since the Syrian uprising began. An Amnesty International report, published in November 2015, accused the Syrian government of forcibly disappearing more than 65,000 people since the beginning of the Syrian Civil War. According to a report in May 2016 by the Syrian Observatory for Human Rights, at least 60,000 people have been killed since March 2011 through torture or from poor humanitarian conditions in Syrian government prisons.

In February 2017, Amnesty International published a report which accused the Syrian government of murdering an estimated 13,000 persons, mostly civilians, at the Saydnaya military prison. They said the killings began in 2011 and were still ongoing. Amnesty International described this as a "policy of deliberate extermination" and also stated that "These practices, which amount to war crimes and crimes against humanity, are authorised at the highest levels of the Syrian government." Three months later, the United States State Department stated a crematorium had been identified near the prison. According to the U.S., it was being used to burn thousands of bodies of those killed by the government's forces and to cover up evidence of atrocities and war crimes. Amnesty International expressed surprise at the claims about the crematorium, as the photographs used by the US are from 2013 and they did not see them as conclusive, and fugitive government officials have stated that the government buries those its executes in cemeteries on military grounds in Damascus. The Syrian government denied the allegations.

=== Perpetrators ===
Four key security agencies have overseen government repression in Syria: the General Security Directorate, the Political Security Branch, the Military Intelligence Branch, and the Air Force Intelligence Branch. All three corps of the Syrian army have been deployed in a supporting role to the security forces; the civilian police have been involved in crowd control. The shabiha, led by the security forces, also participated in abuses. Since Hafez al-Assad's rule, individuals from the Alawite minority have controlled (although they not always formally headed) these four agencies, as well as several elite military units, and comprise the bulk of them.

=== Syrian legal framework ===
Four of the international instruments ratified by Syria and which apply to events in the civil war are particularly relevant: the International Covenant on Civil and Political Rights (ICCPR); the International Covenant on Economic, Social and Cultural Rights; the Convention on the Rights of the Child; and the UN Convention Against Torture. Syria is not a party to the International Convention for the Protection of All Persons from Enforced Disappearance, although it is bound by the provisions of the ICCPR that also prohibit enforced disappearances.

=== International and National courts (International and Universal jurisdiction) ===
All governments manage their territories with national laws. Prosecution for war crimes under the national laws of a given country would typically depend on either the accused, the victim's residence or the occurrence of the event being in that country. Universal jurisdiction bypasses this constraint. In this mechanism, the "cases" that have no connection to the territory (e.g. crimes in high seas) have been used by prosecutors and have been criticized by human rights organisations as leading to a de facto presence requirement (e.g. existence of a crime can not be solved through collecting unbiased evidence from the crime scene, as the court don't have untethered access).

Many perpatators currently reside in Syria. International crimes are typically state crimes. (Note: Indirectly: enabled by (state apparatus ignoring the perpetrator) or directly: perpetrated through the apparatus (black operations).) If, a state is connected to a crime (directly or indirectly), most of the powerful perpetrators (e.g. state officials) reside in Syria. In such situations, the International Court of Justice is the judicial organ to settle international legal disputes submitted by states against other states.

== Syrian courts ==
Shortly after the fall of Bashar Al-Assad in December 2024, Syrian President Ahmed al-Sharaa promised that the new Syrian government would track down and prosecute former Assad regime officials who were implicated in war crimes, stating "We will not hesitate to hold accountable the criminals, murderers, security and army officers involved in torturing the Syrian people." Sharaa also stated that Syrian security forces would seek the repatriation of accused war criminals who had fled overseas after the fall of Assad. However, multiple legal experts have cast doubt on the Syrian court system's capabilities to conduct war crimes trials, while it was highlighted that Al-Sharaa's former rebel group, Hayat Tahrir al-Sham, was also implicated in war crimes during the civil war, including the alleged forced disappearances of over 2,500 Syrians, including 46 children.

Since Al-Sharaa took power, there have been multiple instances of extrajudicial killings or revenge attacks perpetrated against former Assad regime officials, including those who had previously been implicated in crimes against humanity or extortion committed during Assad's rule. A claimed lack of adequate transitional justice measures by the new Syrian government has been blamed for the rise in revenge attacks, with victims of abuses under Assad's government sometimes taking matters into their own hands against former regime officials. Syrian commentators also cited alleged "settlements" that the interim authorities had made with certain high-ranking pro-Assad officials that allow them to escape arrest or prosecution for crimes committed during Assad's rule.

However, there have been some steps made by the transitional government towards criminal prosecution for alleged war criminals. In May 2025, Al-Sharaa announced the establishment of the National Commission for Transitional Justice, a move welcomed by multiple international human rights organizations, while criticism has been drawn for only focusing on crimes committed by Assad regime officials, excluding victims of abuse by non-state actors during the civil war.

On 11 August 2026, the Fourth Criminal Court in Damascus sentenced Bashar al-Assad, his brother Maher al-Assad, former defense minister Fahd Jassem al-Freij and five other officials to death in absentia—except for former head of the Political Security Directorate in Daraa and his first cousin Atef Najib, who was put on trial. They were convicted of premeditated murder, torture and crimes against humanity committed during the Syrian Civil War.

Following the ruling, a crowd gathered outside the court buildings, holding images of some of the people who had been killed under the Assad regime. There were spontaneous scenes of applause and chanting, while cars driving past, sounded their vehicle horns in support of the court's verdict. The week after Bashar's trial, his cousin Wassim al-Assad was also condemned to death. A former leader in pro-government militias, Wassim had been found guilty of multiple murders as well as torture and deprivation of liberty.

At another trial, Ahmad Badreddin Hassoun, the former Grand Mufti of Syria under the Assad regime, was prosecuted on charges of incitement to murder, abuse of his office, "justifying" violence, and complicity in war crimes and crimes against humanity. Hassoun's teachings had been used by the regime to justify attacks on civilian areas and provide a religious basis for its military operations. Hassoun was convicted after a six-day trial and sentenced to life imprisonment on 24 August 2026.

== International courts ==
On 22 December 2016, with 105 votes in favour and 15 against, with 52 abstentions, the United Nations General Assembly voted to establish an "independent panel to assist in the investigation and prosecution of those responsible for war crimes or crimes against humanity in Syria".

=== Independent International Commission of Inquiry on Syria ===
The U.N. General Assembly created a new entity, the International, Impartial and Independent Mechanism, to build investigative files for future prosecutions, Independent International Commission of Inquiry on Syria (COI).

On Wednesday, 7 August 2019, the UN Security Council was briefed by the COI on its findings.

As of December 2024, the COI had collected 11,000 testimonies from victims and witnesses, had studied "mounds of documents", and had cooperated with 170 investigations of suspected Syrian war criminals, among which there had been 50 convictions for war crimes and crimes against humanity.

=== International Criminal Court ===
United Nations High Commissioner for Human Rights Navi Pillay and others called for Syria to be referred to the International Criminal Court. It would be difficult for this to take place because Syria is not a party to the Rome Statute of the International Criminal Court, so the ICC does not have jurisdiction that follows from the location of the crimes.

Referral could alternatively happen via the Security Council, but in 2012, Russia and China were expected to block any referral. Marc Lynch, who is in favour of a referral, stated that some other routes to an ICC investigation, including overcoming Chinese and Russian opposition in the Security Council, were possible.

On 17 January 2025, following the fall of the Assad regime, ICC chief prosecutor Karim Ahmad Khan visited Damascus on an invitation from the Syrian transitional government. Khan discussed cooperation on accountability for war crimes with Ahmed al-Sharaa, the de facto leader of Syria.

=== Special Tasked Court ===
Outside of the ICC, "some believe it would be possible to set up an ad hoc tribunal with a mandate to prosecute atrocities in Syria and Iraq. Such a tribunal would likely come in the form of a hybrid court and include a mix of domestic and international prosecutors and judges. Numerous observers, primarily American scholars and lawmakers, have pushed the establishment of such an institution, going so far as to draft a 'blueprint' for institution's statute. As with an ICC referral, their efforts have been unsuccessful to date." Mark Kersten of the Munk School of Global Affairs at the University of Toronto, however, notes that it would be an "unprecedented challenge" to "prosecute all sides in the war that have committed war crimes" while at the same time retaining "the support of the major actors in the Syrian civil war, many of whom are implicated and would be prosecuted, for those war crimes."

=== International Court of Justice (ICJ) ===
In 2023, Canada and Netherlands jointly filed a lawsuit against the Assad government at the International Court of Justice (ICJ); charging Bashar with ordering torture, mass rapes and other de-humanising tactics on hundreds of thousands of detainees in Syrian prison networks, including women and children. The joint petition accused the Syrian government of organizing "unimaginable physical and mental pain and suffering" as a strategy to collectively punish the Syrian population. In a separate statement, Dutch Foreign Ministry accused Bashar al-Assad of perpetrating indiscriminate violence, war crimes and inhumane tactics against the Syrian people "on a grand scale". This was after repeated Russian vetoes in the UN Security Council that blocked efforts by human rights activists to prosecute Bashar al-Assad over war crimes in the International Criminal Court.

== National courts ==
The European Center for Constitutional and Human Rights (ECCHR) is using both its own employees and other volunteers (Syrian lawyers working in EU member states) to gather evidence and establish cases.

=== Australia ===
On 7 May 2026, Australian authorities charged 2 women, 53-year old Kawsar Abbas, and her 31-year-old daughter Zeinab Ahmad with crimes against humanity. The suspects were taken into custody by the Victorian Joint Counter Terrorism Team (JCTT) after landing at Melbourne Airport. Kawsar Ahmad, her daughter, as well as her husband Mohammed Ahmad are charged with the enslavement of two Yazidi women.

=== Austria ===
On 6 July 2026, two Syrian officials from the Assad regime were convicted by an Austrian court in Vienna for several offenses including sexual assault and torture against opponents. The first, Khaled al-Halabi, head of the General Intelligence Directorate of Raqqa from 2011 to 2013, was sentenced to eight years in prison after found guilty of committing torture, aggravated bodily harm and sexual assault against 21 people, according to testimonies by witnesses. Al-Halebi, a member of the Druze minority in Syria, claimed that he had not witnessed or ordered any torture in Raqqa and stated that he was following orders. The second official, former police lieutenant colonel Musab Abu Rukbah, nicknamed the "Angel of Death", was also sentenced to eight years in prison for serious bodily harm, aggravated coercion and sexual coercion.

=== Belgium ===
In January 2024, a Brussels court indicted Hossin A, former leader of a Ba'athist militia based in Salamiyah that perpetrated acts of torture, extrajudicial killings of numerous Syrians, and violent repression of protests on behalf of the government of Syria. The Belgian federal prosecutor's office charged the individual with committing war crimes and "crimes against humanity" between 2011 and 2016.

=== France ===
In November 2018, France issued international arrest warrants for three high-ranking Ba'athist security officers over torturing and killing French-Syrian citizens. The accused officers included Ali Mamlouk, director of National Security Bureau of Syrian Ba'ath party and Jamil Hassan, former head of the Syrian Air Force Intelligence Directorate. In April 2023, a French court declared the establishment of a tribunal to indict the officers of the Assad government charged with "complicity in crimes against humanity", torture and various war-crimes. International Federation for Human Rights NGO described the indictments as "a historic decision". In May 2023, French Foreign Minister Catherine Colonna publicly demanded the prosecution of Bashar al-Assad, denouncing him for perpetrating chemical warfare and killing hundreds of thousands of civilians, and stated:

"the battle against crime, against impunity is part of French diplomacy. We have to remember who Bashar al-Assad is. He's a leader who has been the enemy of his own people for more than 10 years.. So long as he doesn't change, so long as he doesn't commit to reconciliation... so long as he doesn't fulfil his commitments, there's no reason to change our attitude towards him."

In November 2023, France issued international arrest warrants for Bashar al-Assad, his brother Maher and two Syrian Arab Armed Forces generals Ghassam Abbas and Bassam al-Hassan, charging them with "complicity in crimes against humanity and complicity in war crimes" over their roles in perpetrating the Ghouta chemical attacks. The arrest warrant for Bashar al-Assad was appealed by prosecutors from an anti-terrorist legal unit. The appeal was rejected and the warrant was confirmed on 26 June 2024. On 20 January 2025 a second arrest warrant was issued for Assad accusing him of ordering a bombing in Deraa in 2017 that killed a French civilian. The first arrest warrant was annulled in July 2025 by the Cour de Cassation due to sovereign immunity however since Assad was overthrown, new arrests warrants could be issued. In September 2025, France reissued its arrest warrants for al-Assad and other high ranking Syrian officials for the 2012 deaths of journalists Marie Colvin and Rémi Ochlik.

In May 2024, France conducted a trial in absentia for three Syrian Ba'athist officials accused of war crimes: Jamil Hassan, Ali Mamlouk, and Abdel Salam Mahmoud. The French court declared the three officials to be guilty of "crimes against humanity and war crimes" and sentenced them to life imprisonment. The judges of the French tribunal stated that two Franco-Syrian citizens were tortured to death alongside thousands of civilians held as captives in the detention centres of the Syrian Air Force Intelligence Directorate.

As of January 2025, French authorities had issued arrest warrants for fourteen members of the Assad regime in total.

As well as regime figures, France also prosecuted former Jaysh al-Islam officer Majdi Nema, who was arrested in 2020 and whose trial opened in April 2025. Nema was accused of recruiting children under 15 to serve as child soldiers and conspiring with the leaders of Jaysh al-Islam to commit other atrocities. Despite maintaining his innocence, Nema was found guilty and sentenced to ten years' imprisonment.

=== Germany ===
Germany has legally enacted universal jurisdiction (used on pirates and slave traders) to allow prosecutions for war crimes committed anywhere, against any people of any citizenship. German authorities started conduct a background inquiry to gather information in 2011. The aim (Strukturverfahren) was to establish war crimes cases, whether in Germany or in courts elsewhere (such as the International Criminal Court). The investigative/protective units are organised under the federal prosecutor's office with 11 staff members, and 17 war-crimes police officers. The police war-crimes unit established a total of 17 cases from 2011 to 2013 and 2,590 from 2014 to 2016.

Under the Völkerstrafgesetzbuch (Code of Crimes against International Law (CCAIL)), the first German war crimes trial related to atrocities committed in the Syrian Civil War was the case of Aria L., a German who had been involved in Islamist and Salafist groups in Germany since 2013 and had travelled to Idlib in Syria in 2014. Aria L. was photographed in three separate photos in front of severed heads of Syrian army members mounted on metal spears. He was convicted of the war crime of treating protected persons in a gravely humiliating or degrading manner and sentence to two years' imprisonment on 12 July 2016.

German prosecutors charged two Syrians, Kamel T. and Azad R. in 2016 and Basel A. and Majed A. in 2018, for joining Salafist militant group such as Ahrar al-Sham and Jabhat al-Nusra.

On 23 August 2019, a 33-year-old Syrian (name undisclosed) was charged in the western Germany city of Koblenz with committing war crimes.

In late October 2019, two Syrians suspected of having been secret service officers, Anwar Raslan and Eyad al-Gharib, were arrested in Germany and charged with crimes against humanity. Anwar Raslan was charged with 59 counts of murder, and rape and sexual assault. Eyad al-Gharib was charged with aiding and abetting a crime against humanity. Part of the evidence was based on the photographs of the 2014 Syrian detainee report, taken by a former Syrian military police photographer, nicknamed Caesar for security reasons.

In May 2020, a Syrian doctor, Hafiz A., from Homs was accused of beating and torturing rebel men by the federal prosecutor's office in Karlsruhe. In June 2020, another Syrian doctor from Homs, Alaa Mousa, was arrested in Hesse on suspicion of crimes against humanity. Mousa was jailed for life in 2025.

In September 2020, during the trial of Anwar Raslan and Eyad al-Gharib in Koblenz, some documents were acquired from the Branch 251 intelligence unit in Syria, which showed the move of corpses from the unit to military hospitals.

On November 19, 2020, Fares A.B., a former Free Syrian Army soldier, was convicted of "war crimes, attempted homicide, torture, and membership of the Islamic State of Iraq and Syria (ISIS)". Germany’s Federal Court of Justice later upheld his conviction.

In January 2021, two Syrians, Khedr A.K. and Sami A.S., were charged with membership in Jabhat al-Nusra and killing of an army officer in their homeland in 2012. In February 2021, former Syrian state official Eyad al-Gharib, was sentenced by a German court in Koblenz to four-and-a-half-years in prison for crimes against humanity. In August 2021, Germany detained a former member of Free Palestine Movement, Mouafak Al D., in Berlin who was accused of firing a grenade into a crowd of civilians in Yarmouk Camp, Damascus in 2014.

In January 2022, the German state court in Koblenz declared Anwar Raslan, a former colonel who worked under the Syrian Mukhabarat's infamous Branch 251 unit, guilty of "murder, torture, aggravated deprivation of liberty, rape and sexual assault", sentencing him to "life imprisonment". Raslan was the chief of an office of Branch 251 in Damascus, wherein he directed the “systematic and brutal torture” of more than 4,000 Syrians between April 2011 and September 2012, leading to the killings of more than 58 prisoners. Prosecutors stated that the torture operations supervised by Raslan included electric shocks and various forms of sexual violence.

Ahmad H., the alleged former leader of a Shabiha militia, was arrested in Germany in August 2023 and charged with crimes against humanity for having taken part in the torture and abuse of civilians on multiple occasions between 2012 and 2015. On 18 December 2024 he was sentenced to 10 years' imprisonment.

On 3 June 2025, a court in Stuttgart sentenced Ammar A, a former member of a pro-Assad Shia militia, to life in prison for the murder and torture of Sunnis in the town of Bosra al-Sham.

On 16 June 2025, a Syrian doctor, named as Alaa M, was sentenced to life in prison for the murder of two people and the torture of 8 people during his time working in Syria as a doctor at a military hospital and detention centre in Homs in 2011 and 2012. The defendant fled to Germany in 2015, and was arrested in June 2020.

=== Netherlands ===
The Netherlands is using the concept of universal jurisdiction to prosecute their cases.

Islamic State militant Oussama Achraf Akhlafa was convicted in 2019 of terrorism and committing war crimes in both Syria and Iraq. He had posed for photos with the crucified body of an Iraqi man killed by ISIS.

On 2 September 2019, Ahmad al Khedr, also known as Abu Khuder, faced charges of murder and membership of Jabhat al-Nusra. In July 2021, he was sentenced to 20 years in prison for war crimes over his role in the execution of a government soldier.

In January 2024, a district court in The Hague convicted a former member of the pro-Ba'athist "Liwa al-Quds" militia, who was charged with conducting abductions, "complicity in torture", "inhumane treatment" and "membership in a criminal organisation". The Hague district court labelled the "Liwa al-Quds" militant group as a "criminal organization" and stated that its fighters were involved in the perpetration of "looting and violence against civilians and unlawful deprivation of liberty of civilians".

On 8 April 2026, a trial in a district court of The Hague began for a 58 year old man identified only as Rafiq al Q. The defendant, a former member of the National Defence Forces, was charged with torturing and engaging in sexual violence towards nine people. The defendant applied for asylum in the Netherlands in 2021, then arrested in 2023. Rafik was sentenced to 26 years in prison on 15 June 2026.

=== Sweden ===
In 2017, a Swedish court convicted former Syrian soldier Muhammad Abdullah of war crimes committed during the Syrian war and sentenced him to eight months in prison. Abdullah had reportedly moved to Sweden three years previously, and was identified by other Syrian refugees after posting an image on Facebook showing him with his boot on a corpse, smiling. Prosecutors failed to prove that he killed the person depicted, but convicted him of "violating human dignity" in what the New York Times described as a "landmark verdict".

On 19 February 2019, nine torture survivors submitted a criminal complaint against Syrian officials.

In 2024, former Syrian general Mohammed Hamo was charged with aiding and abetting war crimes. His trial began in Stockholm on April 15. He was acquitted, citing insufficient evidence.

On 4 May 2026, Mahmoud Sweidan was sentenced to life in prison for shooting peaceful protesters at Yarmouk Camp in July 2012, as well as for the torture of civilians while stationed at a checkpoint between December 2012 and July 2013. He became a Swedish citizen in 2017.

=== United Kingdom ===
Salem Michel Al-Salem, a former Colonel in the Air Force Intelligence Directorate, was arrested in December 2021 in Buckinghamshire on charges of crimes against humanity related to events in Damascus in 2011. Al-Salem was initially released but was later charged on 9 March 2026 with torture (under the Criminal Justice Act 1988) and the crimes against humanity of murder and "conduct ancillary to murder". This was the first instance in British legal history of an alleged war criminal being charged with murder as a crime against humanity. On 3 July 2026, Al-Salem was deemed unfit to stand trial due to being diagnosed with motor neurone disease. As a result it was decided that he should only face a trial of the facts, which will begin in 2027.

=== United States ===
On 6 December 2024, a federal court in Chicago issued arrest warrants for Jamil Hassan and Abdul Mahmoud on charges of conspiracy to commit war crimes against US citizens held at Mezzeh prison.

On 17 September 2026, a court sentenced Samir Ousman al-Sheikh to 60 years in prison for the torture of inmates at Adra Prison. Al Sheikh was promoted to the rank of brigadier general and head of Adra Prison from 2005 to 2008. In 2020, he moved to the United States. he was arrested at Los Angeles International Airport in July 2024. A jury found him guilty of lying to immigration authorities and attempting to fraudulently obtain an immigration card in March 2026.
