= Rania al-Abbasi =

Abducted Syrian chess champion (born 1970)

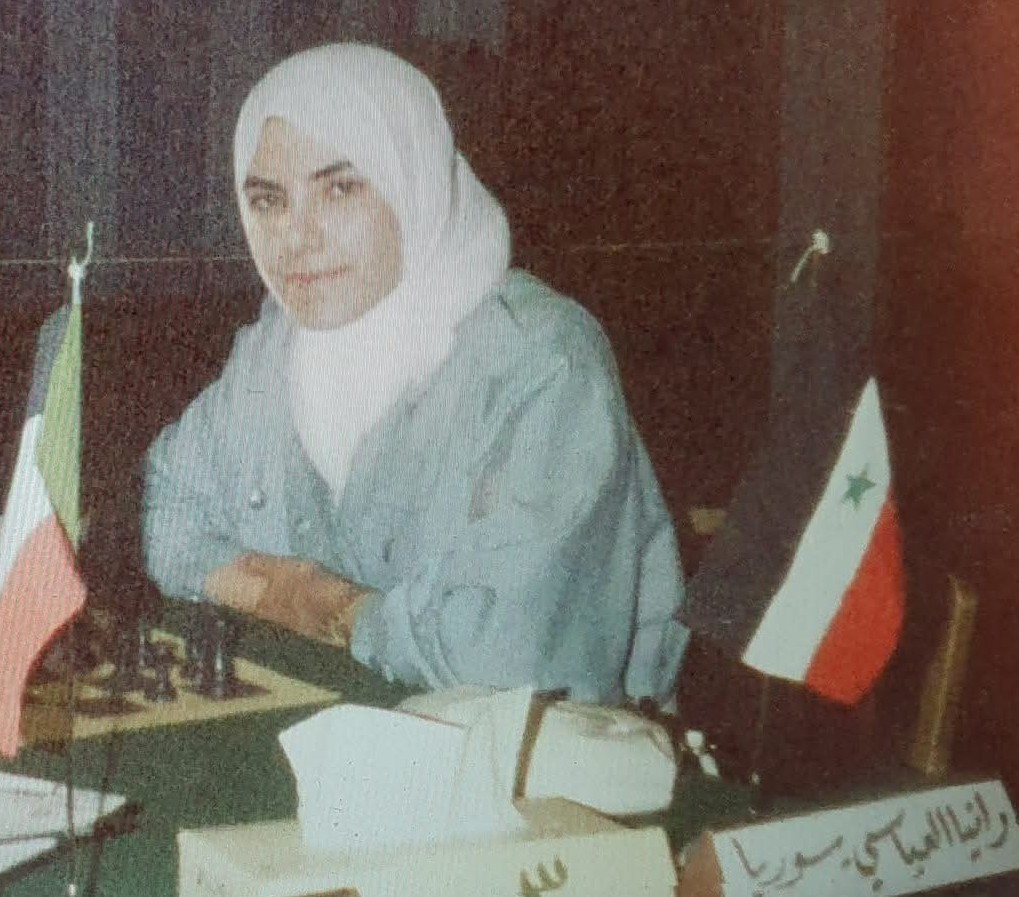

Chess career
- Country: Syria

Rania Al-Abbasi (Arabic: رانية العباسي; born 20 January 1970 - disappeared March 2011) was a dentist and Syrian national chess champion. She was forcibly disappeared by Ba'athist Syria Military Intelligence along with her husband Abdul Rahman Yasin and their six children in 2013. Since then there has been no communication or information regarding Rania or Abdul-Rahman since their disappearance.

In 2026, Syria's National Commission for Missing Person stated that Rania and Abdul's children, aged three to fifteen, are believed to dead. The fate of Rania and her husband remains unknown.

== Early life ==
Rania was born in Damascus on 20 January 1970 to a Sunni family. As an avid chess player, she participated in and won numerous national and international tournaments and olympiads. Her brilliance in chess brought her media coverage. Her father was a prisoner in the notorious Tadmor Prison after an alleged accusation of criticizing the government, according to her family. After participating in the Arab Chess Championship in Amman, Bassel al-Assad, the eldest son of former Syrian president Hafez al-Assad, met her in person. She had a piece of paper that had her father's name on it. She tried handing him the paper in an attempt to mediate for his release. The security forces around Bassel al-Assad blocked her, telling her only to greet him and move away.

In 1995, the family emigrated to Saudi Arabia. Rania worked in a clinic in Riyadh. In 2006, Rania returned to Damascus to open her own clinic in Mashroua Dummer.

== Disappearance ==
In 2011, minor demonstrations began against the Ba'athist regime transformed into large nationwide protests. Damascus, being the capital of Syria, was split between four security agencies: Air Force Intelligence Directorate, Military Intelligence Directorate, Political Security Directorate, State Security Investigations Service. Later on, the paramilitary National Defence Forces and numerous more Ba'athist forces were assigned. Mashroua Dummer, a district where important regime and government ministers lived, was assigned to be monitored by Branch 215.

After the uprisings in Homs, thousands of civilians internally migrated to nearby cities. In these times, Rania started treating children of a family that came from Khalidiye neighborhood in Homs. Rania got to know the mother, Wafaa al-Ayyoubi, after becoming her children's doctor. Rania's husband, Abdul Rahman Yasin, met with the son of the family, Muhammed, who was 18 to 19 years old at the time. Learning that they were displaced and that they had financial problems, he gave him 10,000 SYP (about 100 USD at the time). One time, he left the house and never returned. He was arrested at one of the military's checkpoints, and under heavy torture, he mentioned information about the small amount of money he got from Abdul Rahman.

On 9 March 2013, Abdul Rahman Yasin himself was arrested in front of his children. After her husband's arrest, Rania decided to stay in her house with her children, as she didn't have anything to fear. She was apolitical and didn't participate in any demonstrations against the government. But she was very afraid and terrified for her husband. On 10 March, she even sent her kids to school, as she didn't have a reason not to do so. Rania had a lot of places to migrate to, such as to her family in Saudi Arabia, but she chose to stay. On the following day, 11 March 2013, Majdoleen al-Qadi, Rania's assistant in the clinic, visited her to console her, filled with hope that Abdul Rahman would return at any moment. On the same day, all communication was cut off between Rania and her family, and they were arrested along with her six children and her assistant.

On 30 May 2026, the National Commission for Missing Persons in Syria announced that extensive verification and data analysis concluded with a high degree of certainty that Rania and her six children are deceased. A footage was shown to Hassan Al-Abbasi, Rania's brother, being accused as "financiers of terrorism" be condemned as a punishment. While he was spared the moment they were killed, he was shown the aftermath, describing "their fragile bodies on the ground, with blood coming from their faces."

Rania's secretary, Majdoleen al-Qadi, was also discovered to have been executed via an uncovered military order from October 2013. Efforts to locate the physical remains of the children remain ongoing, while the definitive survival status of Rania and her husband remains unknown.

== International efforts ==
Many international efforts were launched to find Rania.

- Amnesty International sent direct messages to Bashar al-Assad and other high-ranking officials demanding that their fate be revealed.
- Yahya al-Aridi, spokesman for the Syrian Negotiation Commission, brought Rania's story to the debate at the 2017 Astana summit, asking Russian delegation head Alexander Lavrentiev to intercede on his behalf. The interaction didn't end until he got promises regarding this issue and that he would go to Damascus and speak with al-Assad himself about it. After several days, when Yahya met Lavrentiev again, he simply told him that they denied her being arrested.
- The US Department of State's Office for Democracy, Human Rights, and Labor (DRL) has launched a campaign in support of political prisoners worldwide, entitled 'Without Just Cause'. The campaign aims to shed light on the increase in efforts by tyrannical regimes to shut down opposition and oppress political freedoms in many countries around the world, including Syria, and to share the stories of some of the individuals imprisoned for practicing their human rights. Rania Al-Abbasi and her family are Part of a Campaign for Political Prisoners Launched by the US Department of State.
