= Naji Jamil =

Syrian Air Force general

Lieutenant General Naji Jamil
- ناجي جميل
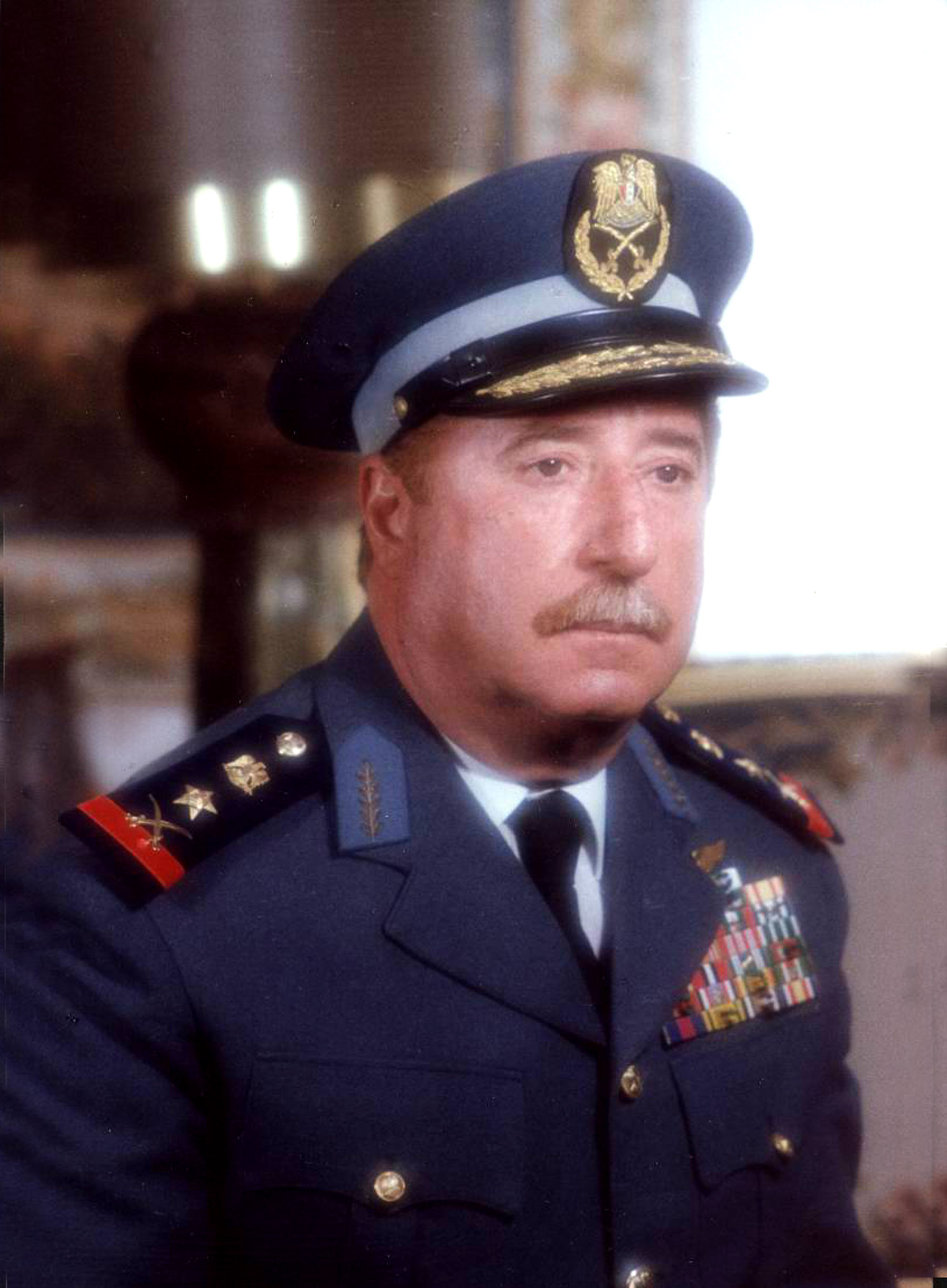

Director of the National Security Bureau
- In office 13 November 1970 – March 1978
- President: Hafez al-Assad
- Preceded by: Abdul-Karim al-Jundi
- Succeeded by: Ahmad Diyab

Commander of the Syrian Air Force
- In office 1971–1976
- Preceded by: Mohammad Assad Moukiiad
- Succeeded by: Subhi Haddad

Member of the Regional Command of the Syrian Regional Branch
- In office 13 November 1970 – March 1978

Deputy Chief of the General Staff of the Army and Armed Forces

Personal details
- Born: 1932 Deir ez-Zor, French Syria
- Died: 2014 Damascus, Syria

Military service
- Allegiance: Second Syrian Republic (1954–1958); United Arab Republic (1958–1961); Second Syrian Republic (1961–1963); Ba'athist Syria (1963–1988)
- Branch/service: Syrian Air Force
- Years of service: 1954–1988
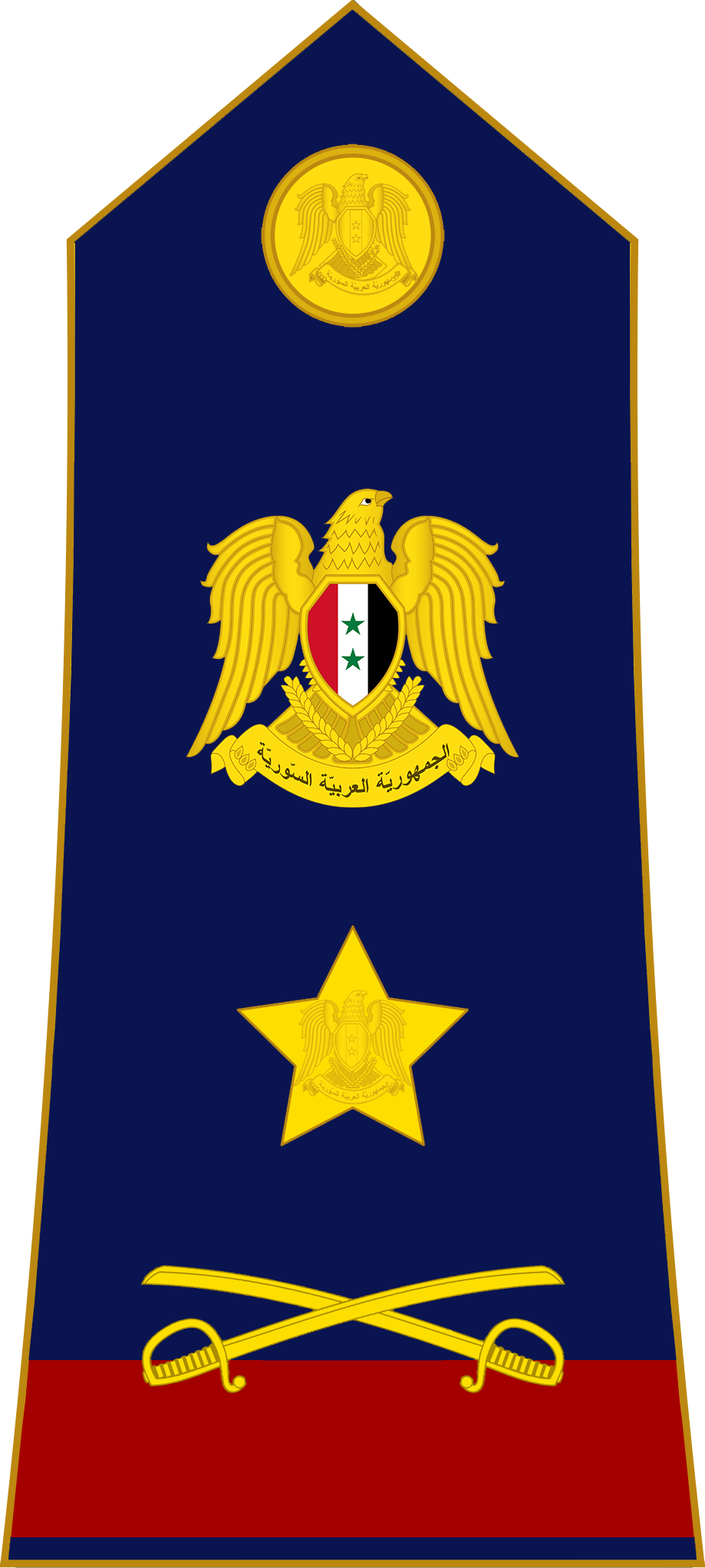
- Rank: Lieutenant general
- Battles/wars: 1966 Syrian coup d'état Six Day War; Yom Kippur War; Lebanese Civil War; Islamist uprising in Syria

Naji Jamil (Arabic: ناجي جميل; 1932–2014) was a Syrian military officer who served as the commander of the Syrian Air Force from 1971 to 1976. A key figure in the Syrian military-security apparatus, his career was deeply intertwined with the political structure of the Ba'ath Party, holding seats on both its Regional Command and Central Committee.

== Life and military career ==
Naji Jamil was born in Deir ez-Zor in 1932. He joined the Military College, graduating in 1954. He was then sent to the United Kingdom to study military aviation. Jamil began his career as a fighter pilot in the Syrian Air Force. He rose through the ranks and, by the time of the Yom Kippur War in 1973, he was commander of the Air Force and therefore commandant of all aerial operations. He was also present in his function for the initial stage of the Syrian intervention in the Lebanon.

Like other Ba'athist officers, he participated in the 1963 and the 1966 Syrian military coups. He sided with Hafez al-Assad (the preceding Air Force commander) and Mustafa Tlass in their struggle against their rival Salah Jadid, until Assad succeeded in assuming power following the Corrective Movement in 1970.

During his eight years in this position, Jamil became known as one of Hafez al-Assad's most prominent officers, as well as a Sunni Muslim personality whose presence Assad ensured at the height of his power as part of his four-man Regional Command.

Concurrent with his role as Air Force commander, Jamil was appointed the Head of the National Security Bureau which oversees and coordinates between all of Syria's extensive security services from 1971 to 1978.

Jamil was strangely widely reported as being executed in 1982, despite being alive and retaining his military rank. Jamil died in 2014 in Damascus.
