= Mohammed Hamo =

Syrian general

Mohammed Hamo (born 1958 or 1959) is a former Syrian Army general. In 2024 he was indicted by a court in Sweden for war crimes allegedly committed in 2012. At the time of his arrest, he was the highest-ranking Syrian official to be tried in Europe for violations of international law.

Hamo was a brigadier general in the Syrian army during the first two years of the Syrian civil war. He worked in the 11th Armored Division and, according to prosecutors at his trial, played a vital role in both strategic decisions and implementing military operations. Hamo was also the leader of an armaments division and responsible for coordinating the supply of weapons to government troops.

In July 2012, Hamo defected to anti-government forces. According to opposition sources Hamo took part in fighting around Baba Amr during the siege of Homs.

Hamo ultimately emigrated to Sweden at an unknown date. After his residence in the country was discovered, he was arrested for war crimes on 7 December 2021, but was released after two days by order of a court.

In February 2024 Hamo was charged with aiding and abetting war crimes "through advice and action". According to prosecutors, Hamo bears responsibility for indiscriminate attacks in Homs and Hama between January and July 2012. Charges were filed against him by eight plaintiffs, including two foreign journalists injured in attacks on the Homs media centre. The decision to charge Hamo was praised by human rights organisations such as Civil Rights Defenders, which noted that the trial would be "the first opportunity for victims of the attacks to have their voices heard in an independent court". Hamo is the first Syrian official to stand trial over the country's military operations.

Hamo's trial began on April 15, 2024 and closed on May 21. His defence argued that he was following orders. On 20 June, Hamo was acquitted by the Stockholm District Court, citing insufficient evidence.

== See also ==
- Anwar Raslan
- Hamid Nouri
