= Ali Mamlouk =

Syrian intelligence officer (born 1946)

- علي مملوك

Deputy Vice President for Security Affairs
- In office 9 July 2019 – 8 December 2024
- President: Bashar al-Assad
- Prime Minister: Imad Khamis; Hussein Arnous; Mohammad Ghazi al-Jalali
- Preceded by: Mohammed Nasif Kheirbek

National Security and Military Advisor to the Presidency of the Syrian Arab Republic
- In office 18 January 2024 – 8 December 2024
- President: Bashar al-Assad
- Preceded by: Ali Aslan

Director of the National Security Bureau of the Regional Command
- In office 25 July 2012 – 9 July 2019
- Regional Secretary Deputy: Bashar al-Assad; Abdel-Fatah Qudsiyeh
- Preceded by: Hisham Ikhtiar
- Succeeded by: Mohammed Dib Zaitoun

Director of the General Security Directorate
- In office June 2005 – July 2010
- President: Bashar al-Assad
- Preceded by: Hisham Ikhtiar
- Succeeded by: Zouheir Hamad

Personal details
- Born: 19 February 1946 (age 80) Damascus, Syria
- Party: Ba'ath Party
- Nickname: Abu Ayham

Military service
- Allegiance: Ba'athist Syria
- Branch/service: Syrian Arab Armed Forces
- Years of service: 1970s–2005
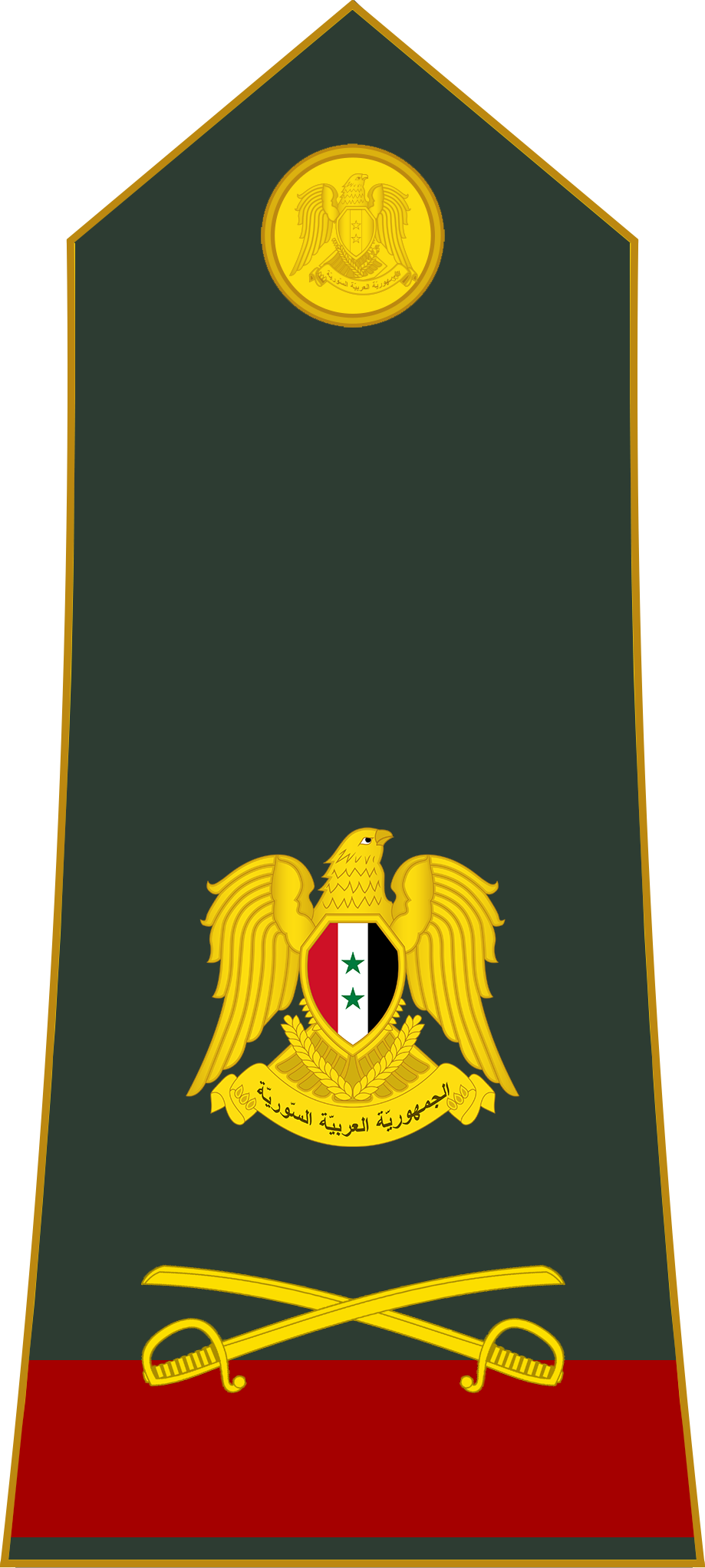
- Rank: Major General
- Commands: General Security Directorate (2005–2010); National Security Bureau (2012–2019)

Ali Mamlouk (Arabic: علي مملوك; born 19 February 1946) is a Syrian intelligence officer who served as a special security and military advisor to former president Bashar al-Assad. He is reportedly one of Assad's most trusted associates. From 2012 to 2019, Mamlouk served as the head of the National Security Bureau of the Ba'ath Party. On 9 July 2019, Mamlouk was appointed as the Syrian Deputy Vice President for Security Affairs.

== Early life ==
Ali Mamlouk was born in Al-Bahsa, Damascus into a Sunni family on 19 February 1946. There is another report giving his birth year as 1945. His family history goes back to Ahmed Pasha Al-Mamlouk a hundred years ago, who is buried in the Al-Mamlouk family graves in Al-Dahdah cemetery in Damascus. His family also has branches in Lebanon, Palestine and Egypt.

== Career ==
Mamlouk is said to be one of the founding officers of the Syrian Air Force Intelligence in the 1970s. He was deputy director there, when in June 2005 President Bashar al-Assad appointed him head of the General Security Directorate. In 2010, Gen. Mamlouk discussed efforts to increase co-operation between Washington, D.C. and Damascus on terrorism issues at a surprise meeting with US diplomats. He said the GID had been more successful at fighting terrorism in the region because "we are practical and not theoretical".

Mamlouk was said to be on good terms with all of Syria's intelligence agencies; the heads of the Air Force Intelligence Directorate and the Political Security Directorate were once his assistants. In July 2012 following the Damascus security HQ bombing, it was reported that Mamlouk would become the head of the National Security Bureau with the rank of minister overseeing the entire security apparatus, and that former military intelligence chief Abdel-Fatah Qudsiyeh would become his assistant.

=== Syrian Civil War ===
Mamlouk is one of many officials sanctioned by the European Union for their alleged actions against protesters participating in the Syrian revolution. His agency had "repressed internal dissent, monitored individual citizens, and had been involved in the Syrian government's Siege of Daraa, where protesters were killed by Syrian security services". In addition, he was added to the European Union's sanction list on 9 May 2011 on the grounds that he "involved in violence against demonstrators" during the war. Swiss government also put him into sanction list in September 2011. On 23 April 2012, the US government imposed sanctions on him, saying he had been responsible for human rights abuses, including the use of violence against civilians. Additionally, he was also sanctioned by Australia, Canada, Japan, Monaco, Switzerland, and the United Kingdom.

In August 2012, Mamlouk was accused of trying to blow up the situation in Lebanon in agreement with Lebanese Minister Michel Samaha, who admitted to transporting explosives in his car to carry out assassinations of a list of people in agreement with Syria. Samaha with the help of the former Lebanese Security Chief Jamil Al Sayyed "tried to carry out assassination" of Samir Geagea, Saad Hariri and Wissam al-Hassan.

In May 2015, concern mounted regarding Mamlouk's whereabouts and health after not having been seen for some time, leading to comparisons with Rustum Ghazaleh who recently met a violent and unclear death. In July 2015, Mamlouk visited Jeddah in Saudi Arabia and Muscat in Oman and met with Saudi and GCC officials to discuss proposals for ending the Syrian Civil War. In August 2015, Mamlouk visited Cairo and met President Abdel-Fattah el-Sissi, senior security officials. Mamlouk and his Egyptian counterparts reportedly discussed the fight against Islamic State, and against other Islamist factions, including the Muslim Brotherhood.

In 2018, Maj. Gen. Mamlouk made a rare visit to Cairo to meet with his Egyptian counterpart, Abbas Kamel, director of the GIS with discussing “political, security and counterterrorism issues”. Between 2021 and 2023, he held meetings with Saudi intelligence chief Khalid bin Ali Al Humaidan, the first such since the outbreak of the civil war. On 18 January 2024, President Bashar al-Assad appointed Mamlouk as a national security advisor, and deputy vice president of the Syrian Arab Republic for security and military affairs.

Mamlouk learned of the regime's collapse from a phone call around 4 a.m. As he tried to flee toward the airport, his convoy was ambushed, though he escaped unharmed. He then sought refuge at the Russian Embassy, where Russian officials later guarded him to the Hmeimim base and helped him reach Russia safely. (Note: Other reports alleged that he fled Syria to Lebanon with Hezbollah's assistance and eventually settled in Dahieh, Beirut.)

== Criminal investigations ==
=== Lebanon ===
On 11 August 2012, Lebanon indicted Ali Mamlouk in absentia and former Lebanese Information Minister Michel Samaha for their alleged plots to assassinate Lebanese political and religious figures. Lebanese judicial officials issued a warrant for Mamlouk's arrest on 4 February 2013.

=== France ===
In November 2018, French prosecutors issued international arrest warrants for three senior Syrian intelligence and government officials: Ali Mamlouk, Abdel Salam Mahmoud and Jamil Hassan. The warrants brought charges including collusion in torture, forced disappearances, crimes against humanity and war crimes. Four days of hearings at the Paris Cour d'assises started on 21 May 2024, and on May 25 all three men were convicted in absentia of involvement in the torture and killing of two French citizens in Syria.
