= Al-Khatib prison =

Detention centre in Damascus, Syria

- Location: Muhajreen neighborhood, Damascus, Syria
- Status: Defunct
- Security class: Detention center, Torture center
- Closed: 2024
- Managed by: General Intelligence Directorate (Syria) (Branch 251)
- Director: Anwar Raslan (during the Syrian Civil War)

Notable prisoners
- Demonstrators, political prisoners, human rights activists

Al-Khatib prison is a detention and torture center in the Muhajreen neighborhood of central Damascus, Syria. It was operated by Branch 251 of the Syrian General Intelligence Directorate during the era of Ba'athist Syria.

Al-Khatib, like many prisons under the regime of Bashar al-Assad, is known from testimonies given by former detainees and survivors who recount the poor conditions and use of systematic and generalized torture that included rape and sexual violence. The conditions caused a significant number of deaths at Al-Khatib, some of which have been identified in the pictures taken by photographer César. During the Syrian civil war the prison held demonstrators, political prisoners, and human rights activists.

Anwar Raslan, a former Syrian colonel who was convicted of crimes against humanity in Germany, was in command of Branch 251 that managed the prison.

== Justice ==
At the beginning of 2019, two former employees of the Branch, sergeant Eyad al-Gharib and colonel Anwar Raslan, were arrested in Germany. They were tried for atrocities committed within Branch 251 between 2011 and 2012.

In January 2021, Eyad al-Gharib was found guilty of complicity in crimes against humanity, for transporting demonstrators to the Branch.

The verdict at the sentencing of al-Gharib officially recognized that crimes against humanity had been committed at al-Khatib. The judges declared that at the prison of Branch 251 of the Syrian General Intelligence Directorate, brutal physical and psychological violence was used to force confessions, obtain information about the opposition movement, and to prevent prisoners from participating in further demonstrations against the government.

On 13 January 2022, Anwar Raslan, whose trial took place after the conviction of Al-Gharib, was found guilty of crimes against humanity by the High Court of Koblenz, as well as of the murder of 27 detainees between 2011 and 2012. He was sentenced to life in prison and is required to compensate the victims. Feras Fayyad, who testified as the first witness in the trial, was among the survivors whose testimony was cited by prosecutors in establishing the charges related to torture and sexual violence.

== United States sanctions ==
The Independent International Commission of Inquiry on Syria identified Branch 251 and Al-Khatib prison as a facility controlled by the Syrian General Intelligence Directorate where death in detention and torture have occurred.

== See also ==
- Human rights in Ba'athist Syria
