= Syria Justice and Accountability Centre =

- Syria Justice and Accountability Centre
- Abbreviation: SJAC
- Formation: April 2012
- Tax ID no.: 501c3 non-profit
- Headquarters: Washington, DC
- Location: United States
- Executive director: Mohammad Al-Abdallah
- Website: https://syriaaccountability.org/

The Syria Justice and Accountability Centre (SJAC) is a non-profit justice and legal documentation organization that monitors and reports on violations by various actors in the Syrian Conflict. Its documentation includes data on the Syrian government, opposition forces, ISIS, and foreign actors. The organization was started by the group Friends of the Syrian People in 2012, who had a stated goal of preserving documentation and creating a centralized source for data collection. SJAC primarily works on issues related to transitional justice, criminal accountability, and human rights violations in Syria.

SJAC is a Washington D.C.–based organization that has staff and analysts in Europe and the United States. It also has documenters who collect witness statements about crimes against humanity in Turkey, Syria, and Iraq. SJAC often collaborates with researchers and human rights and justice–based organizations in the European Union and Syria.

== Current documentation mechanisms ==
=== Trial reporting ===
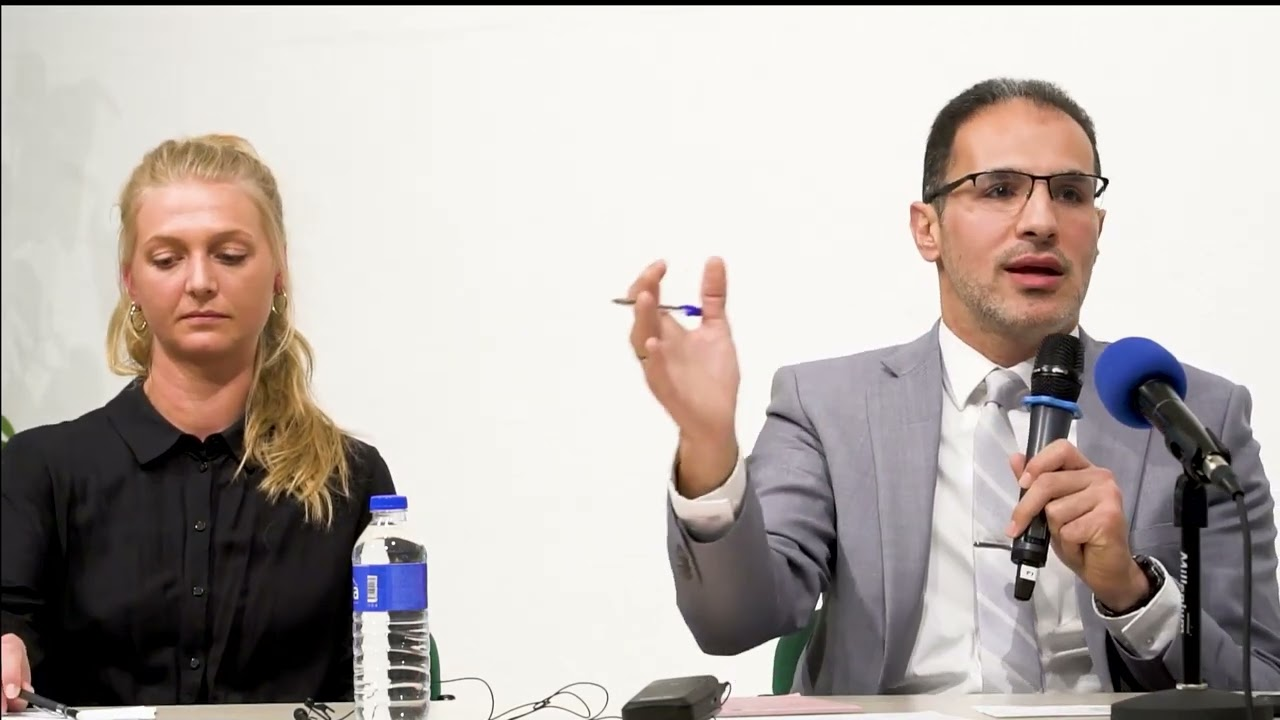
Director Mohammad Al-Abdallah in an educational session about witness protection

SJAC's legal team in Germany monitors and reports on trials of those accused of committing war crimes in Syria. Two ongoing trial monitoring cases conducted by SJAC are that of Anwar Raslan and Alaa M., a German doctor accused of committing crimes against humanity while employed by the Syrian Government. SJAC previously monitored the German trial of Eyad Al-Gharib who was sentenced to four and a half years in prison for his role in knowingly transporting detainees to detention sites where they would face systematic torture and abuse.

=== Missing persons cases ===
SJAC works with several teams of responders in Syria which exhume and investigate mass graves and document information about missing persons in Syria. SJAC works with the Argentine Forensic Anthropology Team to provide training in Syria on how to accurately exhume, examine, and document mass graves and human remains.

=== Documentation training ===
SJAC provides training in Arabic, both in person and virtually to those working to recover remains and discover missing persons in Syria. Training material provided by SJAC includes videos, fact sheets, and quizzes which are meant to prepare individuals to collect evidence of crimes and forced disappearances.

=== Government document preservation ===
SJAC preserved 5,003 government documents found in former Syrian Government intelligence offices. The documents survived bombing during the conflict in Raqqa and Homs, and were later smuggled by activists from Syria to Turkey. The documents detail instances where government officials had tortured and spied on Syrians in the lead-up to the Syrian Conflict. Later documents include evidence of broad authorization by the government to allow security forces to use force against peaceful protests and uprisings during the 2011 Arab Spring.

In an interview with France 24, SJAC claimed that it had identified a number of documents which could later be used for criminal prosecution of government officials who had engaged in war crimes and crimes against humanity. Further analysis by outside organizations will be necessary to determine if and how prosecution of former official would be possible under current international law.

== Analysis ==
SJAC publishes articles, blogs, and reports that pertain to transitional justice, human rights abuses, war crimes, international law, refugee issues, and the international community's response to the Syrian conflict. Recent blogs and publications center around current events, challenges faced by refugees, and trial monitoring of Syrian individuals charged with crimes against humanity.

In January, 2021 the organization filed a communication with the Office of the Prosecutor of the International Criminal Court asking for an investigation into crimes committed against Syrian refugees who were attempting to cross the border into Greece. The communication was lodged in response to accusations that the European Coast Guard (Frontex) had damaged migrant boats and endangered lives by pushing boats away from Greek territorial waters. The case is currently being reviewed by the ICC, which will determine whether to conduct a larger investigation.

== Bayanat ==
Bayanat is a relational database software created by SJAC that sorts and organizes large sets of open-source digital data. It was developed in 2014 and contains over 1.8 million pieces of data that primarily document human rights violations in Syria by perpetrators on both sides of the conflict. The database was first made public on GitHub in December 2020. SJAC shares this data with the International Impartial Independent Mechanism as well as other justice mechanisms that utilize documentation of violations perpetrated during the Syrian Conflict.
