= Mohammed Dib Zaitoun =

Syrian politician and army general

- محمد ديب زيتون

Director of the National Security Bureau of the Regional Command
- In office 9 July 2019 – 18 January 2024
- Regional Secretary Deputy: Bashar al-Assad; Abdel-Fatah Qudsiyeh
- Preceded by: Ali Mamlouk
- Succeeded by: Kifah Moulhem

Director of the General Intelligence Directorate
- In office 25 July 2012 – 7 July 2019
- President: Bashar al-Assad
- Prime Minister: Riyad Farid Hijab; Wael al-Halqi; Imad Khamis
- Preceded by: Zouheir Hamad
- Succeeded by: Hossam Louka

Director of Political Security Directorate
- In office 2009 – 25 July 2012
- Preceded by: Muhammad Mansoura
- Succeeded by: Rustum Ghazali

Personal details
- Born: 21 February 1951 (age 75) Damascus, Syria
- Party: Ba'ath Party

Military service
- Allegiance: Ba'athist Syria
- Branch/service: Syrian Arab Army
- Years of service: 1971–2009
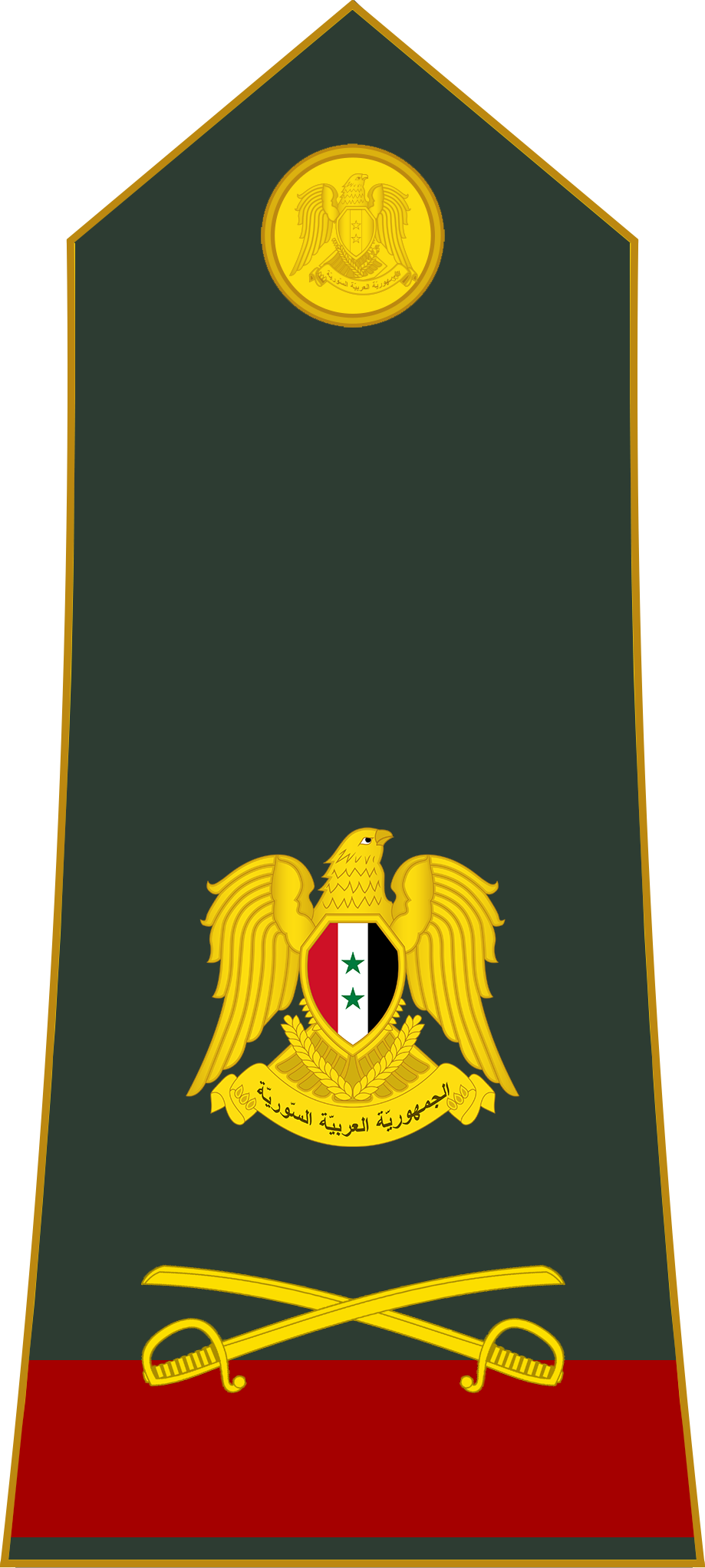
- Rank: Major General
- Unit: Mechanized Infantry; Military Intelligence
- Commands: 10th Mechanized Division (1999-2007); General Security Directorate Second in Command (2007-2009); Political Security Directorate (2009-2012); General Security Directorate (2012-2019); National Security Bureau (2019-2024)
- Battles/wars: Syrian civil war

Mohammed Dib Zaitoun (Arabic: محمد ديب زيتون; born 20 February 1951) is a former director of the Syrian General Security Directorate and a close adviser of former Syrian President Bashar al-Assad. He is one of many officials sanctioned by the European Union for their actions against protesters participating in the Syrian civil war. On 9 July 2019, Dib Zaitoun was appointed as the Director of National Security Bureau of the Ba'ath Party. His tenure ended on 18 January 2024.

== Background ==
Mohammed Dib Zaitoun was born in Damascus to a Sunni family. His father was a Sergeant in the Syrian Army. He was commissioned as a Lieutenant in a Mechanized Infantry regiment in the Syrian Arab Army in November 1971 after graduating from the 3-year long officer course at the Homs Military Academy. Before taking up his position as head of the General Security Directorate, he was the head of the Political Security Directorate (PSD). He took over the PSD position in 2009 after the previous head Muhammad Mansoura was removed because of his involvement in organized smuggling activity on the Syrian Iraqi border.

Before being head of the PSD, Dib Zaitoun had been the deputy head of the General Security Directorate during which time he was asked, along with other members of the president's inner circle, to investigate the assassination in 2008 of Hezbollah’s Imad Mughniyeh in Damascus.

== Career ==
At the start of the Syrian civil war, Dib Zaitoun became one of nine members of the government’s Central Crisis Management Cell which was tasked with handling the protests and the violent crack down on protesters. After the 18 July 2012 bombing of the crisis management cell and the death of four key members of the crisis management team, Dib Zaitoun was elevated to head the General Security Directorate and his previous position as head of the Political Security Directorate was taken over by Rustum Ghazali. The two countries appear to maintain a certain degree of cooperation, particularly in intelligence matters.

In 2016, Dib Zaitoun held meetings with Alberto Manenti, the former head of Italy's external security agency AISE. In July 2019, Dib Zaitoun was replaced by Major General Hossam Louka.
