= Ahmad Diyab =

Syrian former politician

Ahmad Diyab (Arabic: أحمد دياب) is a Syrian former politician who worked as the head of the National Security Bureau.
