= Hisham Ikhtiyar =

Syrian politician (1941–2012)

Major General Hisham Ikhtiyar
- هشام اختيار

Director of the National Security Bureau of the Regional Command
- In office 9 June 2005 – 18 July 2012
- Regional Secretary: Bashar al-Assad
- Preceded by: Mohammed Saeed Bekheitan
- Succeeded by: Ali Mamlouk

Director of the General Intelligence Directorate
- In office December 2001 – 9 June 2005
- President: Bashar al-Assad
- Preceded by: Ali Hammoud
- Succeeded by: Ali Mamlouk

Member of the Regional Command of the Syrian Regional Branch
- In office 9 June 2005 – 18 July 2012

Personal details
- Born: 1941 Damascus, Syria
- Died: 20 July 2012 (aged 70–71) Damascus, Syria
- Party: Ba'ath Party

Military service
- Allegiance: Ba'athist Syria
- Branch/service: Syrian Arab Armed Forces
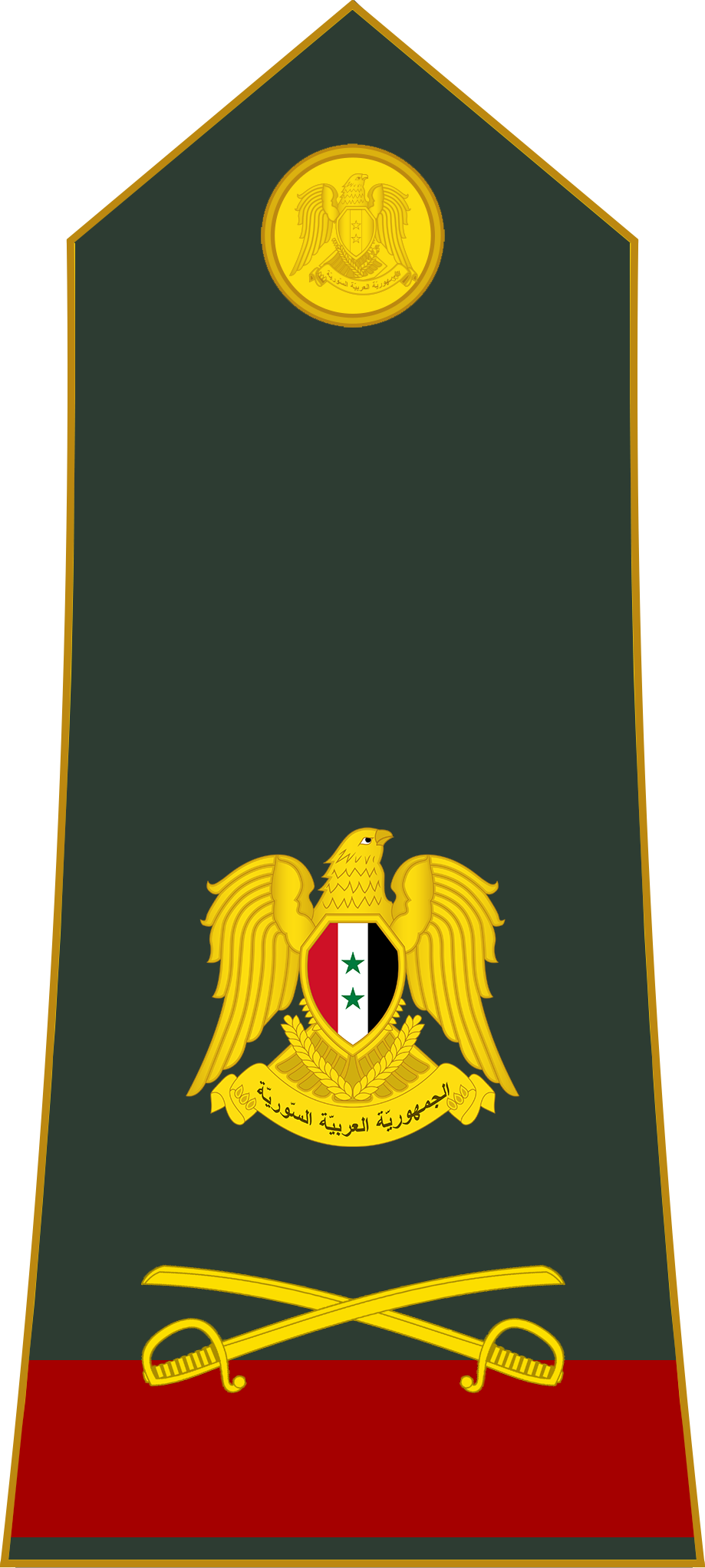
- Rank: Major General
- Commands: General Security Directorate (2001–2005); National Security Bureau (2005–2012)

Major General Hisham Ikhtiyar (Arabic: هشام اختيار); 1941 – 20 July 2012) (family name also transliterated as Ikhtiar, Bakhtiar, Bekhityar, Bekhtyar and other variants) was a Syrian military official, and a national security adviser to president Bashar al-Assad.

== Early life ==
Hisham Ikhtiyar was born to a Sunni family in Damascus in 1941.

== Career ==
Ikhtiyar was director of the General Intelligence Directorate from 2001 to 2005. He was one of the Syrian officers who monitored and repressed the Muslim Brotherhood in Syria.

Then he was appointed head of Syria’s general intelligence directorate. In addition, he was an advisor to Syrian president Bashar Assad. He was appointed director of the Ba'ath Party regional command's National Security Bureau (NSB) in 2005.

== Controversy ==
Ikhtiyar was regarded as a part of Assad's inner circle. In 2006, the United States Treasury Department announced that American citizens and organizations were forbidden from engaging in any transactions with Ikhtiyar, for "significantly contributing to the Syrian Government's support for designated terrorist organizations", and in 2007, Ikhtiyar's name was added to a list of Syrians barred from entering American territory.

Major General Ikhtiyar was reportedly charged with quelling the initial pro-democracy protests in Daraa. The brutal crackdown launched by the security services in the southern city helped trigger the subsequent nationwide unrest. In May 2011, the US treasury department and the European Union imposed sanctions on the National Security Bureau, saying it had directed Syrian security forces to use extreme force against demonstrators.

== Rumoured death ==
On 19 May 2012, the Free Syrian Army's (FSA) Damascus council announced that one of their operatives from the FSA's Al Sahabeh battalion had successfully poisoned all eight members of Bashar Assad's Crisis Cell, a group of top military officials who run the Syrian army's daily operations. The Free Syrian Army's Damascus council said they believed at least six out of the eight members, including Hasan Turkmani, Assef Shawkat, Mohammad al-Shaar, Daoud Rajha, Hisham Ikhtiyar and Mohammed Saeed Bekheitan, to have been killed.

Mohammad al-Shaar, then interior minister, and Hasan Turkmani, then assistant vice president, denied their own deaths to State TV, calling it "categorically baseless".

== Death ==
Ikhtiyar was wounded in the 18 July 2012 Damascus bombing of the Syrian Central Crisis Management Cell. On 20 July 2012, Syrian state television announced that he had died from his injuries.
