= Mohammed Nasif Kheirbek =

Syrian official

- محمد ناصيف خيربك

Deputy Vice President for Security Affairs
- In office 2005 – 28 June 2015
- President: Bashar al-Assad
- Prime Minister: Riyad Farid Hijab; Wael Nader al-Halqi
- Succeeded by: Ali Mamlouk

Deputy Director of the General Security Directorate
- In office 1999–2005
- Succeeded by: Hassan Khallouf

Head of the Internal Branch (251), General Intelligence Directorate
- In office 1963–1999
- Preceded by: Position established
- Succeeded by: Bahjat Suleiman

Personal details
- Born: 5 April 1937 Hama, First Syrian Republic
- Died: 28 June 2015 (aged 78) Damascus, Syria
- Resting place: Al-Laqbah, Syria
- Party: Ba'ath Party
- Nickname: Abu Wael

Military service
- Allegiance: Ba'athist Syria
- Branch/service: Syrian Arab Army
- Years of service: 1957–1999
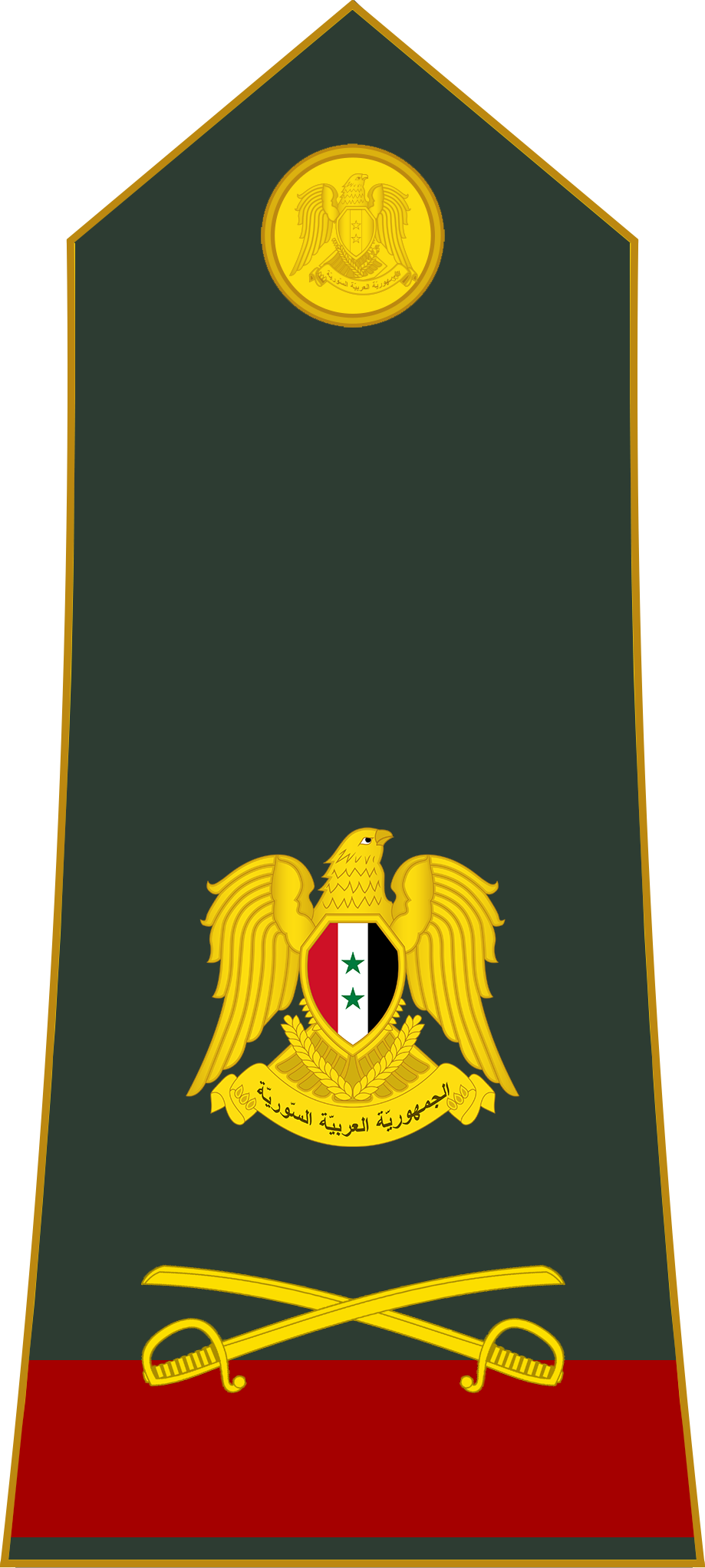
- Rank: Major General
- Unit: Infantry; Military Intelligence

Mohammed Nasif Kheirbek (Arabic: محمد ناصيف خيربك, 5 April 1937 – 28 June 2015) known as Mohammed Nasif or Abu Wael, was the former Deputy Vice-President for Security Affairs in Syria. He was a close adviser of Syrian President Bashar al-Assad and served as Syria's point-man for its relationship with Iran and Lebanon's Shia militias. Nasif was among several officials sanctioned by the European Union for the use of violence against civilians during the Syrian civil war.

== Background ==
Mohammed Nasif Kheirbek was born 5 April 1937 in Homs but his family was from the Alawite village of al-Laqbah near Masyaf. He was a member of the Alawite Kalbiyya tribal confederation, to which Bashar al-Assad belongs. The Kheirbek and Assad family are also connected by marriage. His brother Mu'ein is married to one of Rifaat al-Assad's daughters, Tumadhir. Mohammed was the head of the powerful Kheirbek clan who are represented throughout the Ba'ath Party and the Syrian security apparatuses.

== Career ==
Kheirbek was a very close adviser to the late Syrian President Hafez al-Assad. He was the military attache in East Germany between 1971 and 1975. In the 1990s he was a central figure in relations with Iran and Lebanese Shiite militias. In 1999, he was appointed the deputy director of the General Security Directorate and then in 2005 became the deputy vice-president for security affairs. Two years later, the US froze his assets for contributing to the government of Syria's problematic behavior, which included support of international terrorism, the pursuit of weapons of mass destruction, and the undermining of efforts in Iraq. He was also reported in 2007 to be in charge of Syria's Lebanon portfolio.

== Syrian Civil War ==
In May 2011, Kheirbek was sanctioned by the European Union for the use of violence against protesters participating in the Syrian civil war. The following month, he reportedly traveled to Iran to meet General Qasem Soleimani, the commander of the Quds Force, a division of the Iranian Islamic Revolutionary Guard Corps (IRGC), which conducts special operations outside Iran. They reportedly discussed creating a supply route that would allow Iran to transfer military equipment directly to Syria by way of a new military compound at Latakia airport.

== Personal life ==
Kheirbek got married at an old age and had an only son called Wael.
