= Abdul Fattah Qudsiyeh =

Syrian major general

Major General Abdul Fattah Qudsiyeh
- عبد الفتاح قدسية

Deputy Director of National Security Bureau of the Regional Command
- In office 25 July 2012 – 8 December 2024
- Regional Secretary: Bashar al-Assad

Director of Military Intelligence Directorate
- In office 1 July 2009 – 25 July 2012
- Preceded by: Assef Shawkat
- Succeeded by: Rafiq Shahadah

Director of Air Force Intelligence Directorate
- In office 2005 – 1 July 2009
- Preceded by: Iz a-Din Isma'il
- Succeeded by: Jamil Hassan

Personal details
- Born: 1953 (age 72–73) Hama, Syria
- Party: Ba'ath Party

Military service
- Allegiance: Ba'athist Syria
- Branch/service: Syrian Arab Army
- Years of service: 1973–2012
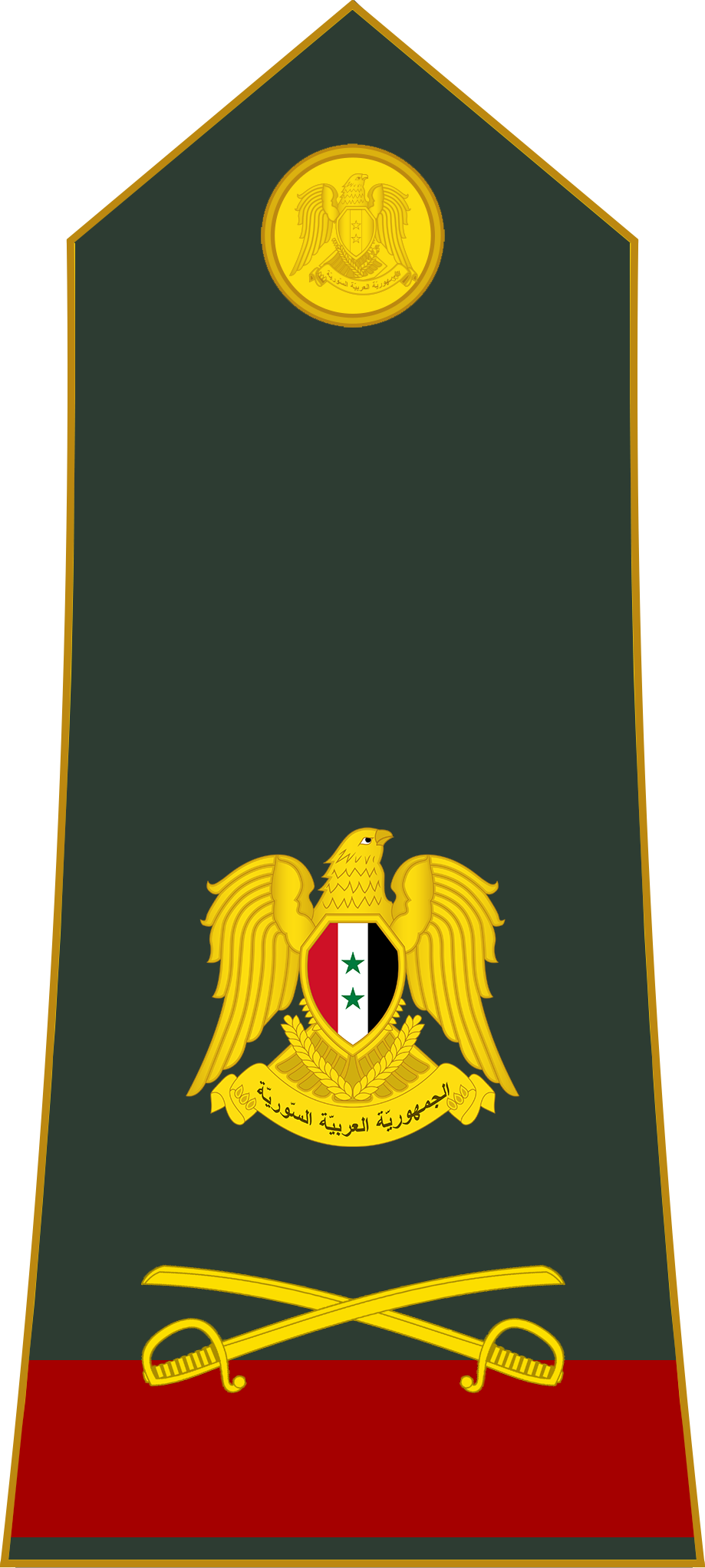
- Rank: Major General
- Unit: Special Tasks Regiment
- Battles/wars: Yom Kippur War; Syrian civil war

Abdul Fattah Qudsiyeh (Arabic: عبد الفتاح قدسية; born 1953) is a Syrian former military officer and the former deputy director of the Syrian National Security Bureau. He was also a close adviser to former Syrian President Bashar al-Assad.

== Early life ==
Qudsiyeh was born in Hama in 1953.

== Career ==
Qudsiyeh was a major general. He served in the special forces and was the head of the Air Force Intelligence Directorate of Syria. He also served as the head of the Syrian Military Intelligence Directorate from 2009 to July 2012.

After the National Security headquarters bombing in July 2012, he was appointed as the deputy director of the National Security Bureau which became headed by Ali Mamlouk. Qudsiyeh was replaced by Rafiq Shahadah as general director of the military intelligence.

== Sanctions ==
Since 9 May 2011, Qudsiyeh is one of several officials sanctioned by the European Union. He was added to the European Union's sanction list on the grounds that he "involved in violence against the civilian population" during the Syrian civil war. He was also sanctioned by the United States and the Swiss government.
