= Ali Hammoud =

Syrian government official (born 1944)

- علي حمود

Minister of Interior
- In office December 2001 – October 2004
- President: Bashar al-Assad
- Prime Minister: Muhammad Mustafa Mero
- Preceded by: Mohammad Harba
- Succeeded by: Ghazi Kanaan

Personal details
- Born: Ali Haj Hammoud; 1944 (age 81–82) Homs
- Party: Ba'ath Party

Military service
- Rank: Major General

Ali Hammoud (Arabic: علي حمود, born 1944) is a former Syrian intelligence officer and general who served as minister of interior from 2001 to 2004.

== Early life ==
Hammoud was born in Homs into an Alawite family in 1944.

== Career ==
Hammoud served as head of the general security administration and involved in suppressing the Islamic revolt during the period of 1976–1982. He was an intelligence officer served in West Beirut. Then he was made Syria's military intelligence chief in Beirut and had the rank of brigadier general. During his term in Lebanon, he had close ties with Emile Lahoud. In May 1988 while serving as military intelligence chief in Lebanon Hammoud and three other Syrian military officers, Saeed Bairaqdar, Ghazi Kanaan and Zuheir Mustat, escaped an assassination in Ghobeiry district of Beirut.

Hammoud was named the head of the General Security Directorate in October 2001, replacing Ali Houri in the post. Shortly after he was appointed interior minister in December 2001 in a cabinet reshuffle by Bashar al-Assad and replaced Mohammad Harba as interior minister. The cabinet was headed by Prime Minister Muhammad Mustafa Mero. Hammoud was also promoted to the rank of major general. Hisham Ikhtiar succeeded Hammoud as the head of the General Security Directorate. Hammoud served as interior minister until October 2004 when he was replaced by Ghazi Kanaan in a cabinet reshuffle.

Political offices
Preceded by Mohammad Harba	Interior Minister; 2001–2004	Succeeded by Ghazi Kanaan
