= Akram Ali Muhammad =

Syrian security officer and politician

- أكرم علي محمد

Governor of As-Suwayda Governorate
- In office 12 May 2024 – 8 December 2024
- President: Bashar al-Assad
- Prime Minister: Hussein Arnous
- Preceded by: Bassam Mamdouh Parsik
- Succeeded by: Mustafa al-Bakour

Deputy Director of General Intelligence Directorate
- In office 7 July 2019 – 2021
- President: Bashar al-Assad
- Prime Minister: Imad Khamis; Hussein Arnous
- Preceded by: Zouheir Hamad

Personal details
- Born: 1962 (age 63–64) Hadidah, Homs Governorate, Syria
- Party: Ba'ath Party
- Children: 3
- Education: Institute of Security Sciences
- Profession: Military officer, Politician

Military service
- Allegiance: Ba'athist Syria
- Branch/service: Syrian Arab Army
- Years of service: 1985–2021
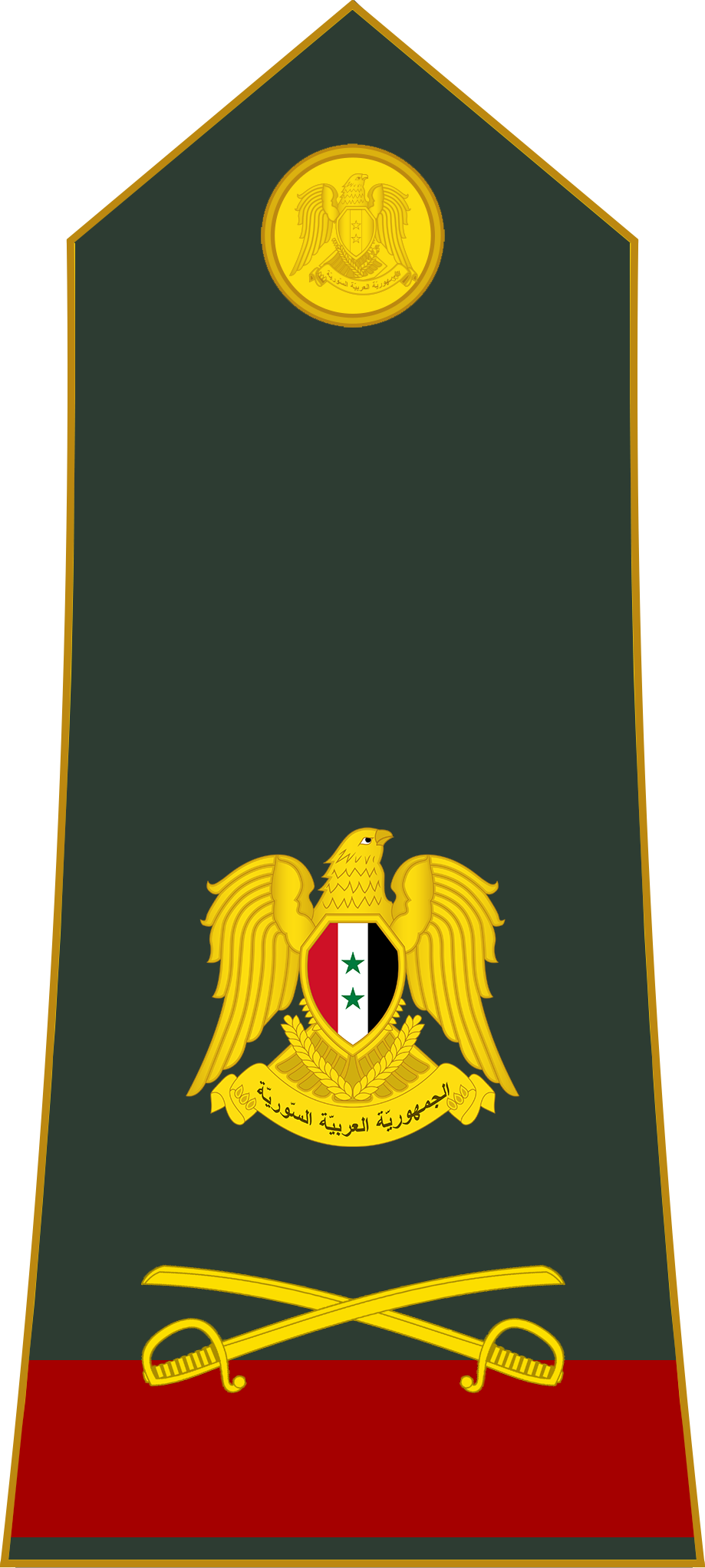
- Rank: Major General
- Unit: Special Tasks Regiment
- Battles/wars: Syrian civil war

Akram Ali Muhammad (Arabic: أكرم علي محمد; born 1962) is a former Syrian security officer and Governor of As-Suwayda Governorate from 12 May 2024 until the fall of the Assad regime. Until 2021, he was the deputy director of Syrian General Intelligence Directorate and a close adviser to President Bashar al-Assad.

== Career ==
Akram Ali Muhammad was born in the town of Hadidah, Homs Governorate in 1962. He obtained a law degree in 1985. He followed a senior leadership course and several courses in management at the Institute of Security Sciences between 1986 and 1990.

Since the 1990s, he served in several military positions. In 2009, he served as head of the State Security Branch in Aleppo with the rank of brigadier general, and remained in his position until the beginning of 2013. Later, he was appointed as head of the State Security Branch in Tartus in 2016, and was promoted in early 2019 to the rank of Major General to be assigned the task of First Deputy Director of the General Intelligence Directorate.

He is a retired major general. He is married and has three children.

He was appointed Governor of As-Suwayda Governorate on 12 May 2024 from Bashar al-Assad's Decree No. (101) of 2024.
