= Rustum Ghazaleh =

Syrian intelligence officer (1956–2015)

- رستم غزالة

Head of Political Security Directorate
- In office 25 July 2012 – 24 April 2015
- President: Bashar al-Assad
- Prime Minister: Riyad Farid Hijab; Wael Nader al-Halqi
- Succeeded by: Nasser al-Ali

Head of the Military Intelligence Directorate Branch 227 (Rif Dimashq)
- In office 2005 – 25 July 2012
- President: Bashar al-Assad
- Preceded by: Mohammed Dib Zaitoun

Head of Military Intelligence in Lebanon
- In office December 2002 – 30 April 2005
- President: Bashar al-Assad
- Preceded by: Ghazi Kanaan
- Succeeded by: Position disestablished

Personal details
- Born: 3 May 1953 Qarfa, Daraa Governorate, Syria
- Died: 24 April 2015 (aged 61) Damascus, Syria
- Party: Ba'ath Party

Military service
- Allegiance: Ba'athist Syria
- Branch/service: Syrian Arab Army
- Years of service: 1973–2015
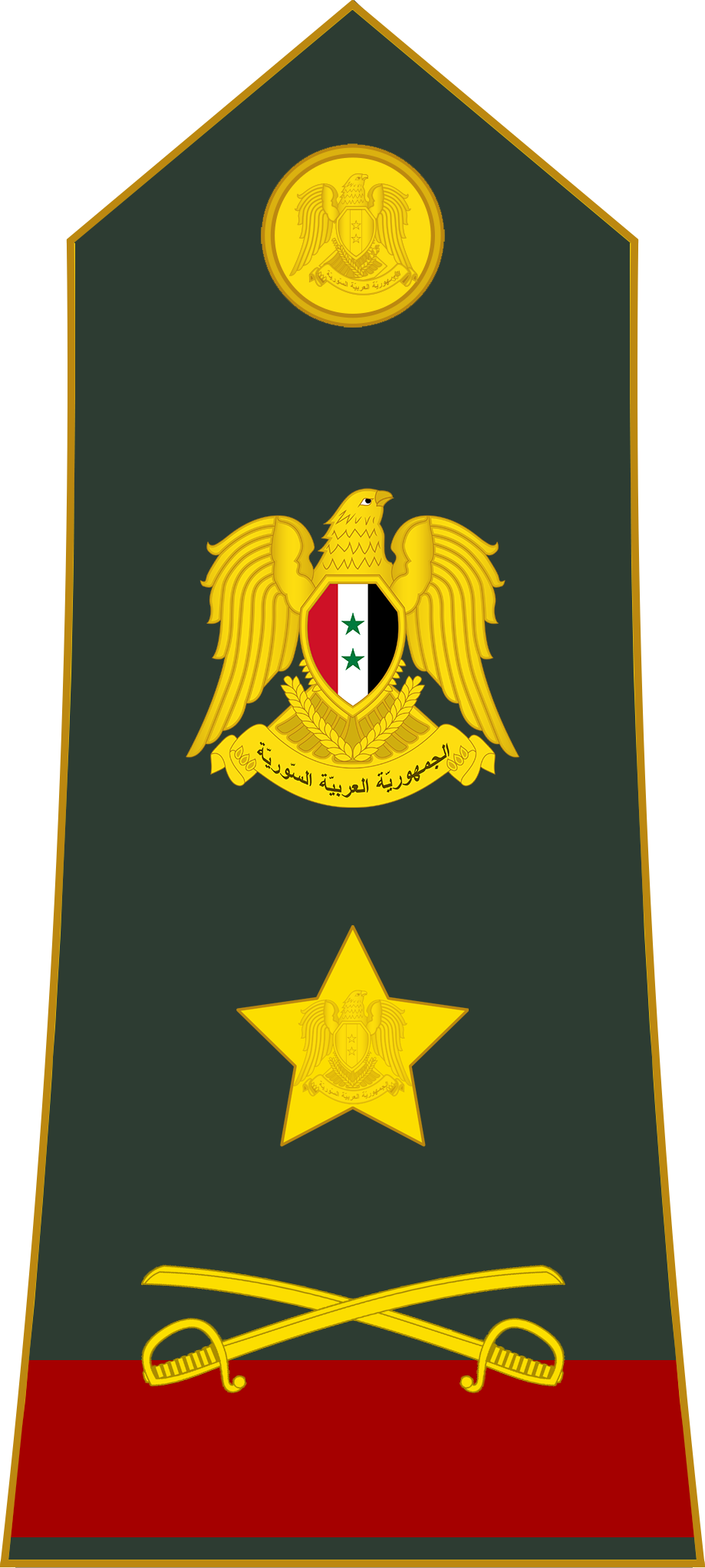
- Rank: Lieutenant general
- Unit: 112th Mechanized Brigade; Military Intelligence; Political Security Directorate
- Commands: Syrian Forces in Lebanon
- Battles/wars: Lebanese Civil War; Syrian civil war

Rustum Ghazaleh (Arabic: رستم غزالة) also transl. from Arabic as Rostom Ghazale, Rustom Ghazalah, Rustom Ghazali; (3 May 1953 – 24 April 2015) was a Syrian military and intelligence officer.

== Early life ==
Ghazaleh was born into a Sunni Muslim family in Qarfa, Daraa Governorate, on 3 May 1953.

== Career ==
The son of a member of the Ba'ath Party since 1950, Ghazaleh joined the Syrian Arab Army as a first lieutenant and platoon commander of a mechanized infantry (BMP-1) unit in 1973, just in time for the Yom Kippur War but did not see frontline combat. He later trained in artillery and military intelligence in the Soviet Union in 1976. As a Major and Lieutenant Colonel, he was an artillery spotter, a company commander, and a commander of a mechanized battalion during the Lebanese Civil War between 1978 and 1990. Between 1980 and 1981 during the Battle of Zahleh, as a Major he was the Adjutant and Aide to the Commander of the 47th Mechanized Brigade. Transferring to Military Intelligence, between 1984 and 1986, he headed the Occupation Administration of Akkar District, and between 1986 and 1988 he was Commander of Syrian Occupation Administration in Baalbek District while simultaneously commanding a Mechanized Battalion. In 1990 he was promoted to Colonel and Commander of Syrian Occupation Administration in the entire Bekaa Valley. He was appointed by Syrian President Bashar al-Assad in December 2002 to succeed the late Ghazi Kanaan as head of Syrian military intelligence in Lebanon. He frequently traveled to the Bekaa valley where he had a residence and his headquarters in Anjar, and has been accused of involvement in the Bekaa drug trade and other smuggling ventures.

In 2004 according to sources and Lebanese journalist and former minister, May Chidiac, he sent her a death threat via a Lebanese political figure saying he would “drink her blood.”

In early 2005, the killing of Rafik Hariri led to intense pressure on Syria. Ghazale's and Kanaan's foreign assets were frozen by the United States for their role in the alleged occupation of Lebanon and other suspected irregularities. Syria eventually withdrew its 15,000 man strong army. Ghazaleh relocated to Syria. However, some Lebanese and foreign observers alleged that Syria keeps interfering with Lebanese politics through parts of its intelligence apparatus left behind in the country; Syria denies the charges. Kanaan later allegedly committed suicide.

In September 2005, Ghazaleh was questioned on the Hariri assassination by United Nations investigator Detlev Mehlis. In December 2005, former Syrian vice president Abdul Halim Khaddam accused Ghazaleh of political corruption, dictatorial rule in Lebanon and of threatening Hariri prior to his death. After the withdrawal from Lebanon little was heard of him. However, at the beginning of the protests in Daraa, Ghazaleh was sent by Bashar al-Assad to assure locals of the president's good intentions. He reportedly told them: "We have released the children" – a reference to several teenagers who were arrested for writing anti-government graffiti inspired by the events in Egypt and Tunisia. In May 2011, the European Union said Ghazaleh was head of military intelligence in Damascus countryside (Rif Dimashq) governorate, which borders Daraa governorate, and was involved in the repression of dissent in the region. He is considered part of Assad's inner circle.

On 24 July 2012, Ghazaleh was appointed chief of political security. He allegedly opposed to the prominent role played by Hezbollah and other foreign fighters (in particular Iranians) in the Syrian civil war, a stance which led to him being attacked by the bodyguards of the pro-Iranian Lt. Gen Rafiq Shahadah in early 2015.

== Death ==
Ghazaleh was severely beaten by the bodyguards of Lt. Gen. Rafiq Shahadah over a disagreement the two had regarding Iranian involvement in the 2015 Southern Syria offensive, with news emerging two months later that Ghazaleh had died on 24 April 2015 after complications from a severe head wound which resulted in him having been clinically dead for several weeks prior.

A figure close to Syrian government officials claimed the argument had been over fuel smuggling, while a Lebanese journalist suspected that Ghazaleh was "gotten rid of" due to the role he could have played in the Special Tribunal for Lebanon. Saad Hariri stated that Ghazaleh had contacted him the day before he was beaten, wanting to appear on television to announce details regarding the Special Tribunal for Lebanon, while an analyst claimed Ghazaleh had seen the end was near for the Syrian government and wanted to defect. Syrian government media failed to report Ghazaleh's death.
