= Hossam Louka =

Syrian intelligence officer

Major General Hossam Louka
- حسام لوقا

Director of the General Intelligence Directorate
- In office 7 July 2019 – 8 December 2024
- President: Bashar al-Assad
- Prime Minister: Imad Khamis; Hussein Arnous; Mohammad Ghazi al-Jalali
- Preceded by: Mohammed Dib Zaitoun
- Succeeded by: Office abolished

Director of the Political Security Directorate
- In office 29 November 2018 – July 2019
- President: Bashar al-Assad
- Prime Minister: Imad Khamis
- Preceded by: Mohammad Khaled al-Rahmoun
- Succeeded by: Nasser Muhammad Al-Ali

Head of the Security Committee
- In office Late 2019 – November 2021
- Preceded by: Qahtan Khalil
- Succeeded by: Mufid Hassan

Personal details
- Born: Hossam Mohammad Louka; 1964 (age 61–62) Khanasir, Aleppo Governorate, Syria

Military service
- Allegiance: Ba'athist Syria
- Branch/service: (Syria) General Intelligence Directorate
- Years of service: 1984–2024
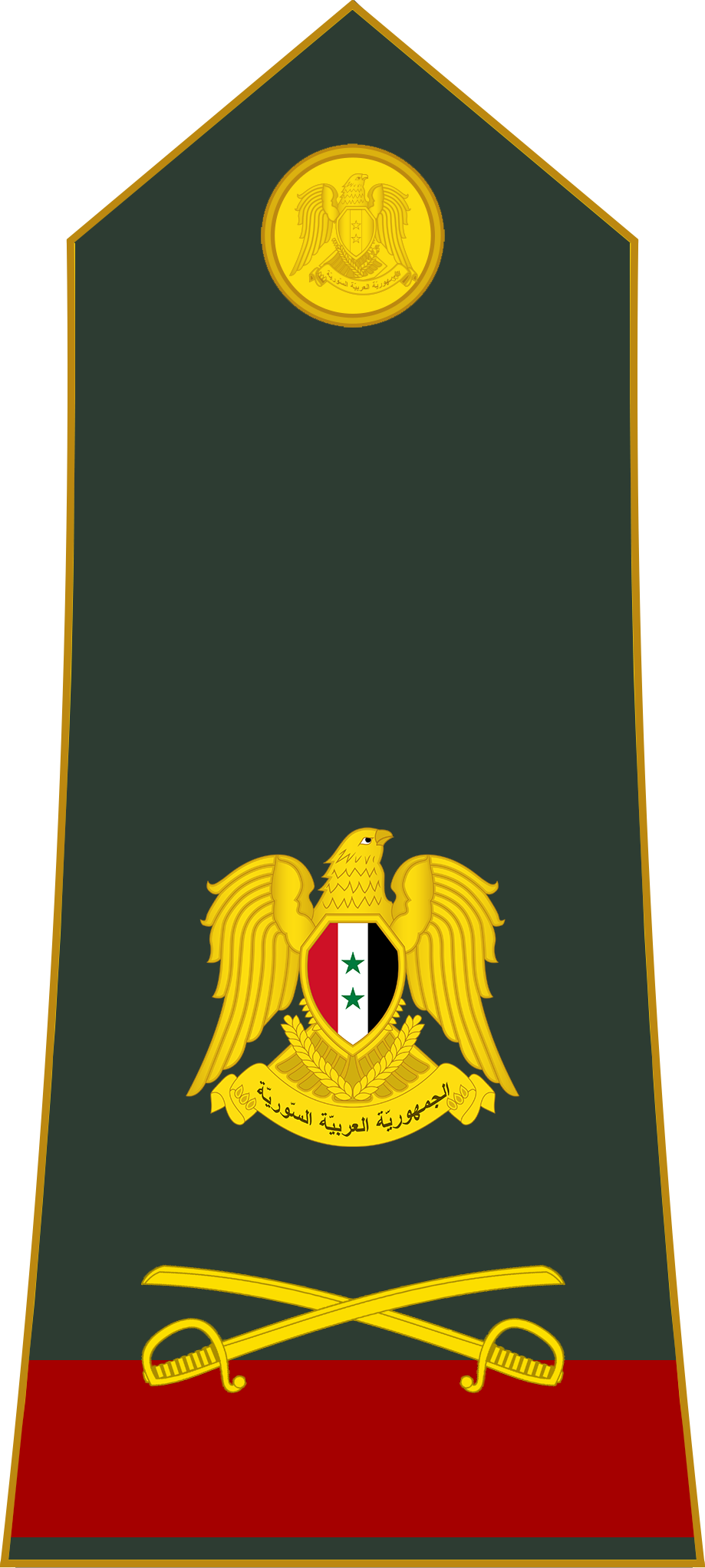
- Rank: Major General
- Commands: General Intelligence Directorate; Political Security Directorate
- Battles/wars: Syrian Civil War

Hossam Mohammad Louka (Arabic: حسام محمد لوقا; born 1964) is a senior Syrian intelligence officer who served as the director of the Syrian General Intelligence Directorate during Ba'athist Syria. With a long career in Syrian security services, Louka played a key role in Syria's intelligence community, notably during the Syrian civil war. He is known for his involvement in various security and intelligence operations within Syria and held multiple leadership roles in the country's intelligence apparatus.

== Early life ==
Louka was born in 1964, in town of Khanasir in the Aleppo Governorate. After secondary education, Louka enrolled in the Homs Military Academy to become a military officer. He graduated in 1984 and served at the Ministry of Interior as a lieutenant in Aleppo.

He rose up the ranks in the Public Security Police and when he was promoted to the rank of colonel, he transferred to the Political Security Directorate, whose role was very limited in comparison with the other intelligence services of Syria. He served at the Aleppo Political Security Branch, where he became in charge of the Afrin Political Security Branch, before he was transferred to Damascus, where he held several positions in the city and the countryside.

== Career ==
Louka's career within Syrian intelligence spans decades, involving numerous key roles in various branches of Syria's security services. Louka held leadership roles in several branches of Syrian intelligence. In 2004, Louka was sent to Homs to take up the position of deputy head of the Political Security Branch, and later the head of the branch.

Louka played a critical role in Syrian intelligence activities during the civil war, which began in 2011. Between 2011 and 2015, his leadership in political security branches in Homs and Hama during the conflict led to his involvement in counter-insurgency operations, domestic and foreign intelligence gathering, and coordination with other Syrian security branches. His role in overseeing the response to opposition groups, protests and local reconciliations has drawn significant scrutiny and criticism from international human rights organizations.

Between 2018 and 2019, he was director of Syria's Political Security Directorate, a branch responsible for overseeing internal security and surveillance. In 2019, Louka was appointed as the director of the General Intelligence Directorate (GID), one of Syria's most powerful security agencies. The GID, responsible for domestic and foreign intelligence operations, reports directly to Syria's leadership and is instrumental in monitoring opposition activity, managing security operations, and coordinating with regional allies. Between 2020 and 2021, he was head of the Security Committee in Daraa, which was responsible for restoring law and order in the governorate after the March 2020 Daraa clashes and the 2021 Daraa offensive.

As the head of GID, Louka oversaw intelligence operations critical to Syria's internal stability, diplomatic security, and counter-terrorism efforts. His role in this position reinforced his status as a key player within the country's intelligence and military establishment.

During the regime's collapse in December 2024, Louka and thousands of intelligence officers were stationed inside the main Damascus security compound. Initially believing orders for a counterattack would arrive, they instead learned that senior officials had already fled. Around 2 a.m., Louka abruptly left the compound, ordering an accountant to open the agency's safe and taking an estimated $1.36 million in cash before escaping. He later reached the Russian Embassy, which arranged his transport to the Russian-controlled Hmeimim base and onward to Moscow.

== Personal life ==
Louka is a Sunni Muslim of Circassian origins.

Louka has been subject to international sanctions by the United States, the European Union, and other entities due to his alleged involvement in human rights abuses, suppression of political opposition, and actions during the Syrian civil war. These sanctions typically freeze his assets and restrict travel, while underscoring the international community's stance on his role within Syria's controversial intelligence operations.
