= Tawfiq Younes =

Former Syrian Intelligence chief

- توفيق يونس

Head of the Internal Branch (251), General Intelligence Directorate
- In office 2011–2016
- President: Bashar al-Assad
- Prime Minister: Adel Safar; Riyad Farid Hijab; Omar Ibrahim Ghalawanji; Wael Nader al-Halqi

Personal details
- Born: Tartus, Syria
- Party: Ba'ath Party

Military service
- Allegiance: Ba'athist Syria
- Branch/service: Syrian Arab Army
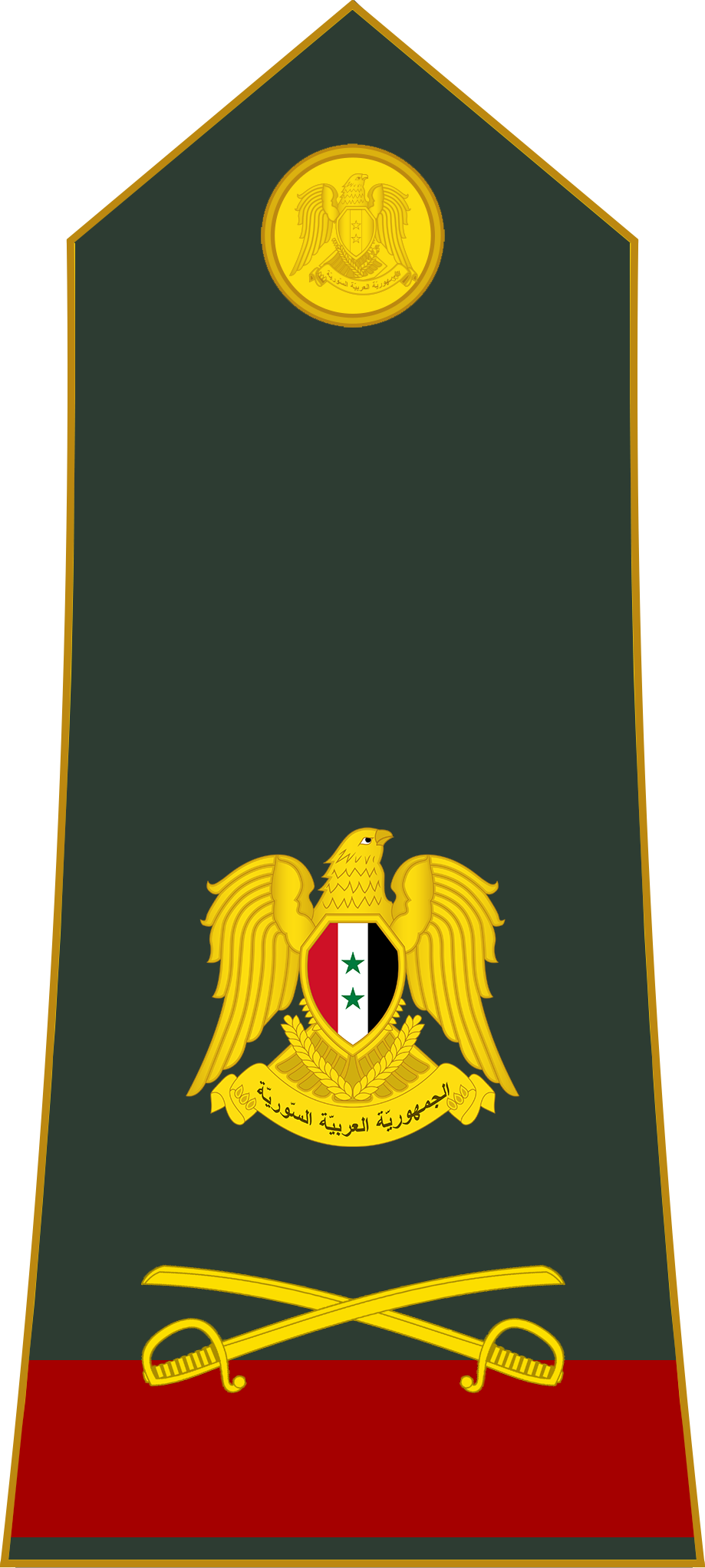
- Rank: Major General

Tawfiq Younes (Arabic: توفيق يونس), also known as Tawfik Yunes, is a retired Major General who was head of the internal branch of the Syrian General Intelligence Directorate (GID), also known as Branch 251 from 2011 to 2016. In 2011, the European Union sanctioned him for "being involved in violence against the civilian population during the Syrian uprisings". He is also sanctioned by Britain and Canada.
