= Jamil Hassan =

Syrian major general

- جميل حسن

Director of Air Force Intelligence Directorate
- In office 1 July 2009 – 7 July 2019
- Preceded by: Abdul Fattah Qudsiyeh
- Succeeded by: Ghassan Ismail

Deputy Director of General Intelligence Directorate
- In office 2004–2009

Personal details
- Born: February 1952 (age 74) Al-Qurniyah, Homs, Syria
- Party: Ba'ath Party

Military service
- Allegiance: Ba'athist Syria
- Branch/service: Syrian Air Force
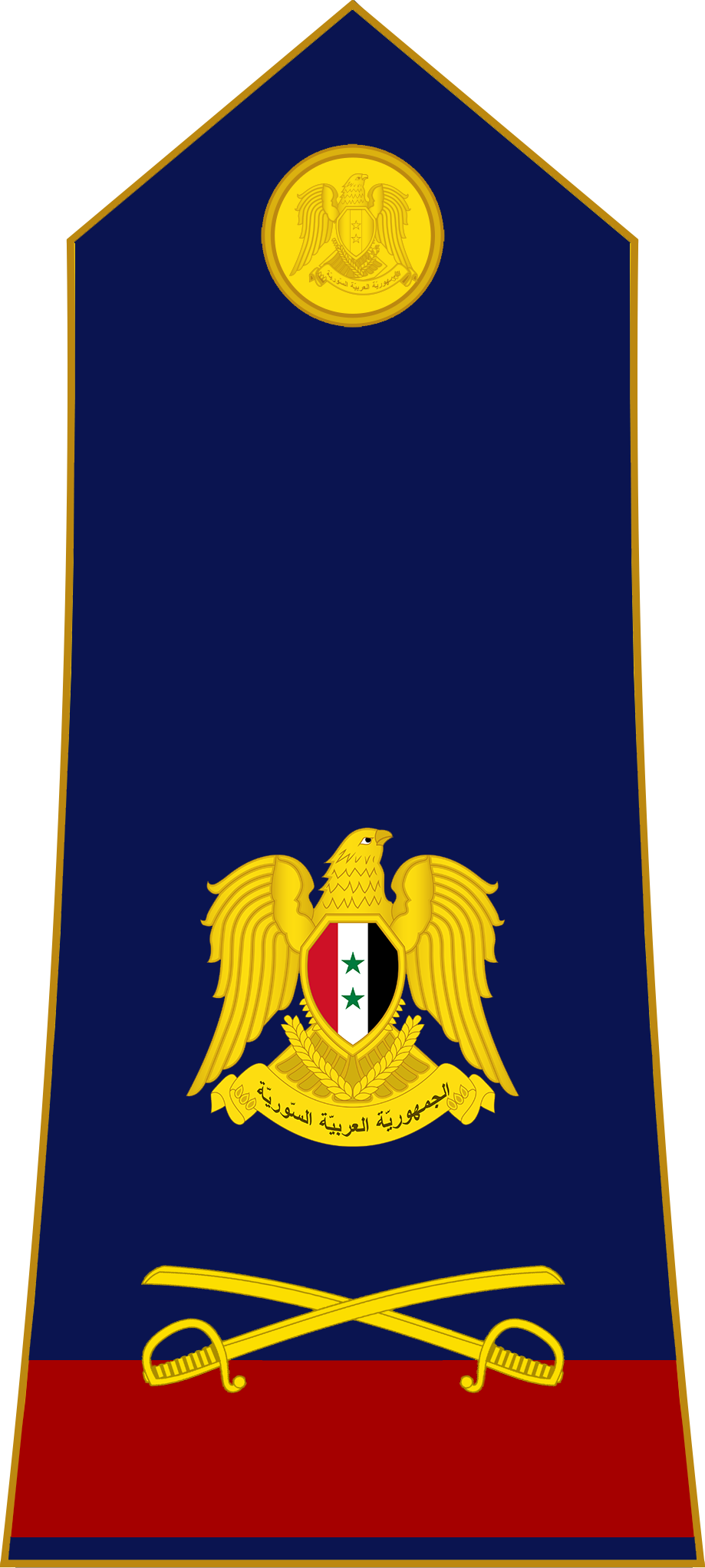
- Rank: Major General
- Unit: Syrian Air Force
- Battles/wars: Islamist uprising in Syria; Syrian civil war

Jamil Hassan (Arabic: جميل حسن) is the former head of the Syrian Air Force Intelligence Directorate and a former close adviser to President Bashar al-Assad.

Hassan oversaw a network of detention facilities including the Mezzeh Prison where inmates were tortured.

== Career ==
Hassan was appointed head of the Syrian Air Force Intelligence Directorate (SAFI) in 2009. He served in that capacity until 2019.

== Sanctions ==
Hassan was sanctioned by the European Union on 9 May 2011 on the grounds that he was "involved in violence against the civilian population" during the Syrian civil war. On 29 June 2011, the United States also sanctioned him due to his involvement in human rights abuses in Syria.

Hassan gave an interview for The Independent in November 2016, disproving claims of his assassination. He stated that the tactics used in the 1982 Hama massacre would have ended the Syrian civil war much faster.

== Criminal investigations ==
=== Germany ===
In June 2018 German news magazine Der Spiegel reported that Germany's chief federal prosecutor had issued an international arrest warrant against Hassan for his alleged involvement in the torture and murder of hundreds of prisoners.

=== France ===
In November 2018, French prosecutors issued international arrest warrants for three senior Syrian intelligence and government officials: Ali Mamlouk, Abdel Salam Mahmoud and Jamil Hassan. The warrants bring charges including collusion in torture, forced disappearances, crimes against humanity and war crimes. Four days of hearings at the Paris Cour d'assises started on 21 May 2024, accusing the three men of involvement in the disappearance, torture and killing of two French citizens between 2013 and 2017. Hassan was convicted and sentenced to life imprisonment in absentia on May 25.

=== United States ===
On 9 December 2024, after the fall of the Assad regime, the U.S. Department of Justice charged the 72-year-old Hassan and Abdul Salam Mahmoud, a brigadier general in SAFI, with conspiring to torture American and Syrian civilians at Mezzeh Prison between 2012 and 2019. The indictment was the first time the U.S. criminally charged top Syrian officials for human rights abuses during the Assad regime.

== Personal life ==
He owned a house in an affluent area of central Damascus. After the fall of the Assad regime he fled to Russia on a cargo plane, where he is living since.

== See also ==
- Air Force Intelligence Directorate
- Syrian Armed Forces
- Syrian civil war
