= National Security Bureau of the Arab Socialist Ba'ath Party – Syria Region =

Syrian intelligence agency

National Security Bureau
- مكتب الأمن الوطني

Agency overview
- Formed: 27 March 1966
- Dissolved: 8 December 2024 (de facto); 29 January 2025 (de jure)
- Superseding agency: National Security Office
- Jurisdiction: General Secretary of the Central Command of the Syrian Regional Branch
- Headquarters: Damascus, Syria
- Agency executives: Kifah Moulhem, Director; Abdul Fattah Qudsiyeh, Deputy Director
- Parent agency: Central Command of the Syrian Regional Branch of the Arab Socialist Ba'ath Party
- Child agencies: Intelligence and security agencies; General Intelligence Directorate (Internal Branch – 251); Political Security Directorate; Military Intelligence Directorate; Air Force Intelligence Directorate

The National Security Bureau (Arabic: مكتب الأمن الوطني), officially the National Security Bureau of the Central Command of the Syrian Regional Branch (Arabic: مكتب الأمن الوطني لحزب البعث العربي الاشتراكي – قطر سوريا), was a Ba'ath Party bureau which coordinated the work of Syria's intelligence and security agencies and advised the General Secretary prior to the 2024 fall of the Assad regime. The last head of the National Security Bureau was Kifah Moulhem.

In the past, individual intelligence and security agencies had a significant degree of independence and generally reported directly to the president of Syria. Since 2023, the Bureau had been conducting a set of restructuring measures in the intelligence and security services, including merging some branches. The main goal of the changes was to amend the powers of intelligence and security services, remove them from some state institutions and develop coordination among the agencies.

== Directors ==
No.	Portrait	Name (Lifespan)	Tenure		
No.	Portrait	Name (Lifespan)	Took office	Left office	Duration
1		Abdul-Karim al-Jundi عبد الكريم الجندي (1932–1969)	27 March 1966	2 March 1969 †	2 years, 340 days
2		Naji Jamil ناجي جميل (1932–2014)	November 1970	March 1978	7 years, 4 months
3		Ahmad Diyab أحمد دياب	1979	1987	8 years
4		Abdul Rauf al-Kasm عبد الرؤوف الكسم (1932–2025)	1987	17 June 2000	13 years
5		Mohammed Saeed Bekheitan محمد سعيد بخيتان (1945–2022)	21 June 2000	6 June 2005	4 years, 350 days
6		Hisham Ikhtiyar هشام اختيار (1941–2012)	9 June 2005	18 July 2012	7 years, 39 days
7		Ali Mamlouk علي مملوك (born 1946)	25 July 2012	9 July 2019	6 years, 349 days
8		Mohammed Dib Zaitoun محمد ديب زيتون (born 1951)	9 July 2019	18 January 2024	4 years, 193 days
9		Kifah Moulhem كفاح ملحم (born 1961)	18 January 2024	8 December 2024	325 days

== Syrian intelligence agencies ==
- General Intelligence Directorate (Internal Branch – 251)
- Political Security Directorate
- Military Intelligence Directorate
- Air Force Intelligence Directorate
