= General Intelligence Directorate (Syria) =

Former Syrian intelligence service

- إدارة المخابرات العامة; Idārat al-Mukhābarāt al-ʿAmmāh

Agency overview
- Formed: 1963; 63 years ago (ISFC 1963–1971) (GID 1971–2024)
- Dissolved: 8 December 2024 (de facto); 29 January 2025 (de jure)
- Superseding agency: General Intelligence Service
- Jurisdiction: Ba'athist Syria
- Headquarters: Kafr Sousa, Damascus, Syria; 33°31′13″N 36°18′42″E
- Agency executives: Hossam Louka (2019–2024), Director; Akram Ali Muhammad (2019–2021), Deputy Director
- Parent agency: Ministry of Interior

The General Intelligence Directorate (Arabic: إِدَارَةُ الْمُخَابَرَاتِ الْعَامَّةِ, romanized: ʾIdārat al-Mukhābarāt al-ʿAmmāh), also known as the General Security Directorate or Syrian GID, was the most important civil intelligence service of former Ba'athist Syria and played an important role of suppressing the people of Syria for the government's interests. The General Intelligence Directorate conducted an oppressive surveillance of the Syrian population, directed foreign intelligence and monitored activities in Lebanon on behalf of Hezbollah until its dissolution in December 2024.

== History ==
In November 1970, Hafez al-Assad ousted Salah Jadid in what he labelled a Corrective Movement. The new system was Syria's longest-lasting since independence and toned down the previous regime's radicalism. It was established in 1971. By 1972, the General Intelligence Directorate was significantly modelled on the GDR's Stasi. Under the government of Hafez al-Assad and Ba'ath Party, especially from 1973, agents of Syria’s GSD were frequent visitors in East Berlin for training. According to Stasi files, the Syrians also received equipment and materials from East Germany, the last such deliveries documented up until 1990.

Under Bashar al-Assad there was a remarkable continuity among the senior personnel in the intelligence community. The service was in competition with Political Security Directorate in the late 20th century. Major General Ghazi Kanaan possibly headed international security for the General Security Directorate in the late 20th century. In the late 20th century, between 1998 and 2001, Major General Ali Houri was director of the General Security Directorate.

After Bashar al-Assad's takeover in 2000, Major General Ali Hammoud was named as head of the General Intelligence Directorate. In 2001, Hisham Ikhtiyar became the head of the General Intelligence Directorate, replacing Hammoud, who became the Minister of the Interior. Ikhtiyar was close to Bashar al-Assad's deceased brother-in-law Assef Shawkat. President Bashar al-Assad in June 2005 appointed General Ali Mamlouk as commander of the General Intelligence Directorate.

Six years later in April 2011, the US government imposed sanctions on Ali Mamlouk, saying he had been responsible for human rights abuses, including the use of violence against civilians. The agency had repressed internal dissent, monitored individuals, and had been involved in the Syrian government's actions in Daraa, where protesters were killed by the security services. The next month, the European Union also imposed sanctions on Mamlouk, saying he had been involved in efforts to suppress anti-government protesters. A Sunni, he is said to be on good terms with all of Syria's intelligence agencies – the heads of the Air Force Intelligence Directorate and the Political Security Directorate were once his assistants. He is a part of Bashar al-Assad's inner circle. After the 18 July 2012 bombing of the Central Crisis Management Cell (Syria) and the death of its four key members of team, Mohammed Dib Zaitoun was named as head of the General Intelligence Directorate.

The General Intelligence Directorate was dissolved along with the Ba'athist Syrian institutions in December 2024 following the collapse of the Assad regime. Anas Khattab, appointed head of Syrian intelligence, said the country's security institutions will be restructured after all former institutions are dissolved. On 29 January 2025, at the Syrian Revolution Victory Conference, Military Operations Command spokesman Hassan Abdul Ghani announced the dissolution of the Ba'athist regime's intelligence and security apparatuses, along with the militias it had established.

== Organization ==
The General Intelligence Directorate was under the jurisdiction of the Ministry of Interior. The GID was also controlled by the President Bashar al-Assad through the National Security Bureau of the Arab Socialist Ba'ath Party Central Command. It is divided into six branches:

- Internal Security Division (Branch 251)
- External Security Division (Branch 285)
- Palestinian Affairs Division
- Raids and Assault Division (Branch 295)
- Information Branch
- Investigations Branch

=== Branch 251 ===
'Syrian General Intelligence Directorate (GID) Branch 251 (Arabic: إدارة المخابرات العامة الفرع الداخلي (251)), also known as internal branch or Al-Khatib branch, was the unit of the Syrian General Intelligence Directorate under the Assad regime concerned with internal security. It has been responsible for security in the Damascus region. Branch 251 operates Al-Khatib prison, a detention and torture center located in the Muhajreen neighborhood in central Damascus.

Anwar Raslan, the former Syrian colonel who was convicted of crimes against humanity and sentenced to life in prison in Germany, commanded a unit in Branch 251.

== United States Department of Treasury sanctions ==
The Independent International Commission of Inquiry on Syria identified Branch 251 and Al-Khatib prison as a facility controlled by the Syrian General Intelligence Directorate where death in detention and torture have occurred. Branch 251 was designated pursuant to Executive Order 13572 (E.O. 13572), which blocks property of certain properties with respect to Human Rights Abuses in Syria, as being owned or controlled by the Syrian General Intelligence Directorate. The head of Branch 251, Ahmed Al-Dib, was designated pursuant to E.O. 13572 for being a senior official of the Syrian GID and subject to US Treasury sanctions.

== List of heads ==
- Mohammed Nasif Kheirbek (1963–1999)
- Bahjat Suleiman (1999–June 2005)
- Fouad Nasif Kheirbek (June 2005 – 2011)
- Tawfiq Younes (2011–2016), the European Union sanctioned him for "being involved in violence against the civilian population during the Syrian uprisings".
- Ahmed Al-Dib (2016–8 December 2024), sanctioned by the United States Treasury for leading Syrian General Intelligence Directorate Branch 251, has been implicated in reports of arbitrary detention and torture of detainees since at least 2011.

== Responsibility ==
The Internal Security Division is responsible for the surveillance of the population, counterintelligence, counter-terrorism, security of Damascus as well as protection of the Government of Syria. The External Security Division is tasked with foreign intelligence work, espionage and national security protection. And the Palestinian Affairs Division is responsible for monitoring the activities of Palestinian groups in Syria and Lebanon.

== Directors ==
- Abd al-Karim al-Jundi (1966–1969)
- Adnan Babagh (1971–?)
- Ali Madani (1970s)
- Nazih Zirayr (?–1983)
- Fu'ad Absi (1983–1987)
- Majid Sa'id (1987–1994)

- Internal branch: Mohammed Nasif Kheirbek (1963–1999)

- Bashir an-Najjar (1994–1998)
- Ali Houri (1998–2001)

- Deputy Director: Mohammed Nasif Kheirbek (1999–June 2005)
- Internal branch (251): Bahjat Suleiman (1999–June 2005)
- External branch: Ayyad Mahmud (1999–?)

- Ali Hammoud (October–December 2001)
- Hisham Ikhtiyar (December 2001–June 2005)
- Ali Mamlouk (June 2005 – 2010), the European Union sanctioned him for "violence against demonstrators during the Syrian uprising".

- Deputy Director: Hassan Khallouf (?–June 2004)
- Deputy Director: Mohammed Dib Zaitoun (June 2004–2009)
- Internal branch (251): Fouad Nasif Kheirbek (June 2005–2011)
- Investigations branch: Anwar Raslan (2008–?)
- Deputy Director: Jamil Hassan (2004–1 July 2009)
- Information branch: Zouheir Hamad (?–July 2010)

- Zouheir Hamad (July 2010–July 2012), the European Union sanctioned him for "the use of violence across Syria and for intimidation and torture of protesters during the Syrian Civil War".

- Deputy Director: General Nazih (July 2010–July 2012), the European Union sanctioned him for "being responsible for the use of violence across Syria and intimidation and torture of protestors during the Syrian uprising".
- Information branch: Ghassan Khalil (July 2010–?), the European Union sanctioned him for "being involved in repression and violence against the civilian population in Syria during the Syrian uprising".

- Mohammed Dib Zaitoun (25 July 2012 – 7 July 2019)

- Deputy Director: Zouheir Hamad (25 July 2012 – 7 July 2019)
- Internal branch (251): Tawfiq Younes (2011-2016), the European Union sanctioned him for "being involved in violence against demonstrators during the Syrian uprisings".

- Hossam Louka (7 July 2019 – 8 December 2024)

- Deputy Director: Akram Ali Muhammad (7 July 2019 – 2021)
- Internal branch (251): Ahmed Al-Dib (2016 – 8 December 2024)

=== Regional Directors ===
- Damascus branch: Col. Hafez Makhlouf (2011-2014), the European Union sanctioned him for "being involved in violence against demonstrators during the Syrian uprisings".

- Damascus (branch 285): Brig. Gen. Ibrahim Ma'ala (2011-2012) accused of "ordering or committing crimes against humanity" by Human Rights Watch.
- Damascus (branch 285): Brig. Gen. Hussam Fendi (past-2011) accused of "ordering or committing crimes against humanity".

- Homs (branch 318): Brig. Gen. Firas Al-Hamed (2012) accused of "ordering or committing crimes against humanity".
- Latakia branch: Brig. Gen. Khudr Khudr (2012) accused of "ordering or committing crimes against humanity".
- Daraa branch: Brig. Gen. Ahmed Dibe (2011).
- Raqqa branch: Brig. Gen. Khaled al-Halabi (2008-2013) accused of being involved with the arrest and torture of dissidents, as well as telling security forces to fire on any unauthorized gathering of more than four people.

== List of detainee and survivors ==
- Firas Alshater
- Amer Matar
- Feras Fayyad
- Hussein Gharir

== Other Syrian intelligence agencies ==
- National Security Bureau
- Political Security Directorate
- Military Intelligence Directorate
- Air Force Intelligence Directorate
