= Political Security Directorate =

Former Syrian intelligence service

- إدارة الأمن السياسي; Idarat al-Amn al-Siyasi

Agency overview
- Formed: 1971; 55 years ago
- Dissolved: 8 December 2024 (de facto); 29 January 2025 (de jure)
- Superseding agency: General Intelligence Service
- Jurisdiction: Government of Syria
- Headquarters: Kafr Sousa, Damascus, Syria
- Agency executive: Ghaith Shafeeq Deeb, Director
- Parent agency: Ministry of Interior

The Political Security Directorate (PSD, Arabic: إدارة الأمن السياسي, romanized: Idarat al-Amn al-Siyasi) was an intelligence service of Ba'athist Syria. It was divided into an Internal Security Department and an External Security Department. Intelligence division was affiliated to the Ministry of Interior. Its activities involved the surveillance of the satellite parties of National Progressive Front and was active against the Syrian opposition. It monitored literature, print publications, political dissent, and all media outlets. This intelligence service was headed by Major General Ghaith Shafeeq Deeb from 5 February 2021 until December 2024.

== Organization ==
The Political Intelligence Directorate was supervised by the Ministry of Interior. The PSD was also controlled by former President Bashar al-Assad through the National Security Bureau of the Arab Socialist Ba'ath Party Central Command. It was divided into two departments:

- Internal Security Department (ISD)
  - Investigative Branch
  - Operations Branch
- External Security Department (ESD)
  - Arab Affairs Branch
  - Refugee Affairs Branch
  - Zionist and Jewish Affairs Branch

== Directors ==
- Ahmad Sa'id Salih (Early 80s —1987)
- Adnan Badr Hassan (1987–2002)
- Ghazi Kanaan (2002–2004)
- Muhammad Mansoura (2004–2009)
- Mohammed Dib Zaitoun (2009 – 25 July 2012)
- Rustum Ghazali (25 July 2012 – 24 April 2015)

- Head of Investigative branch: Brig. Gen. Makhmoud al-Khattib (2011).
- Head of Operations branch: Brig. Gen. Mohamed Heikmat Ibrahim (2011).

- Nasser Muhammad Al-Ali (24 April 2015–2017)
- Mohammad Khaled al-Rahmoun (2017–26 November 2018)
- Hossam Louka (26 November 2018–July 2019)
- Nasser Muhammad Al-Ali (July 2019–5 February 2021)
- Ghaith Shafeeq Deeb (5 February 2021–December 2024)

=== Regional Directors ===
- Rif Dimashq branch: Brig. Gen. Sameer al-Sheikh (1993–2005)
- Aleppo branch: Brig. Gen. Akram Ali Muhammad (2009–2013)
- Daraa branch: Brig. Gen. Atef Najib (2011), the European Union sanctioned him on 9 May 2011 for "being responsible for the violence against protesters in Daraa during the Syrian uprising". He was replaced by Brig. Gen. Nasser al-Ali.
- Damascus branch: Brig. Gen. Riad al-Shahada (2020–2024)

== Other Syrian intelligence agencies ==
- National Security Bureau
- General Intelligence Directorate
- Military Intelligence Directorate
- Air Force Intelligence Directorate
