= Security Committee =

The Security Committee, also called the Daraa Military and Security Committee, was established in Southern Syria and functioned as a representative of the Assad regime in the area.

== Background ==
The Bashar al-Assad regime, following the recapture of Southern Syria after the 2018 Southern Syria offensive, allowed former rebel groups to reconcile with it and operate autonomously in the region. This "soft power" approach was supported by Russia and limited Iranian influence in the area. The committee, also known as the Daraa Military and Security Committee, was a local arm of the regime and negotiated with the Central Committees.

Russian forces in the region were initially perceived as neutral and helped "broker" the reconciliation agreements in November 2021.

== Membership ==
Members of the committee included Louay al-Ali, who was the head of the Military Intelligence Directorate in Daraa Governorate.

== Activities ==
The committee enforced a settlement for former opposition fighters in March 2020 in the city of Al-Sanamayn.

The security committee coordinated with the Eighth Brigade to raid the town of Al-Karak in November 2020, following an attack by Free Syrian Army fighters on a "checkpoint" run by the Air Force Intelligence Directorate, which ended in the capture of numerous regime members.

The committee met with "dignitaries" from the Suwayda Governorate town of Al-Raha, where the Syrian Brigade Party is based, in August 2021, and threatened to bomb the headquarters of the Anti-Terrorism Force.

The security committee reached settlement agreements in the city of Tafas in September 2021.

Later that month, the security committee, including Louka and al-Ali, met with Russian officers, members of the former opposition and Central Committee members, in Nawa and worked towards a settlement agreement.

== Heads ==
Tenure of Security Committee heads
Name	Date began	Date ended	Refs
Zuhair Hamad	?	2012	
Wafiq Nasser	July 2012	2017	
Kifah Moulhem	July 2018	?	
Qahtan Khalil	October 2019	November 2019	
Hossam Louka	Late 2019	November 2021	
Mufid Hassan	November 2021	?	
