= Ghassan Ismail =

Syrian military official

Ghassan Jaoudat Ismail
- غَسَّان جَوْدَت اِسْمَاعِيْل

Director of Air Force Intelligence Directorate
- In office 8 July 2019 – 5 January 2024
- Preceded by: Jamil Hassan
- Succeeded by: Qahtan Khalil

Personal details
- Born: 1960 (age 65–66) Duraykish, Tartus Governorate, UAR
- Party: Ba'ath Party
- Other political affiliations: National Progressive Front

Military service
- Allegiance: Ba'athist Syria
- Branch/service: Syrian Air Force
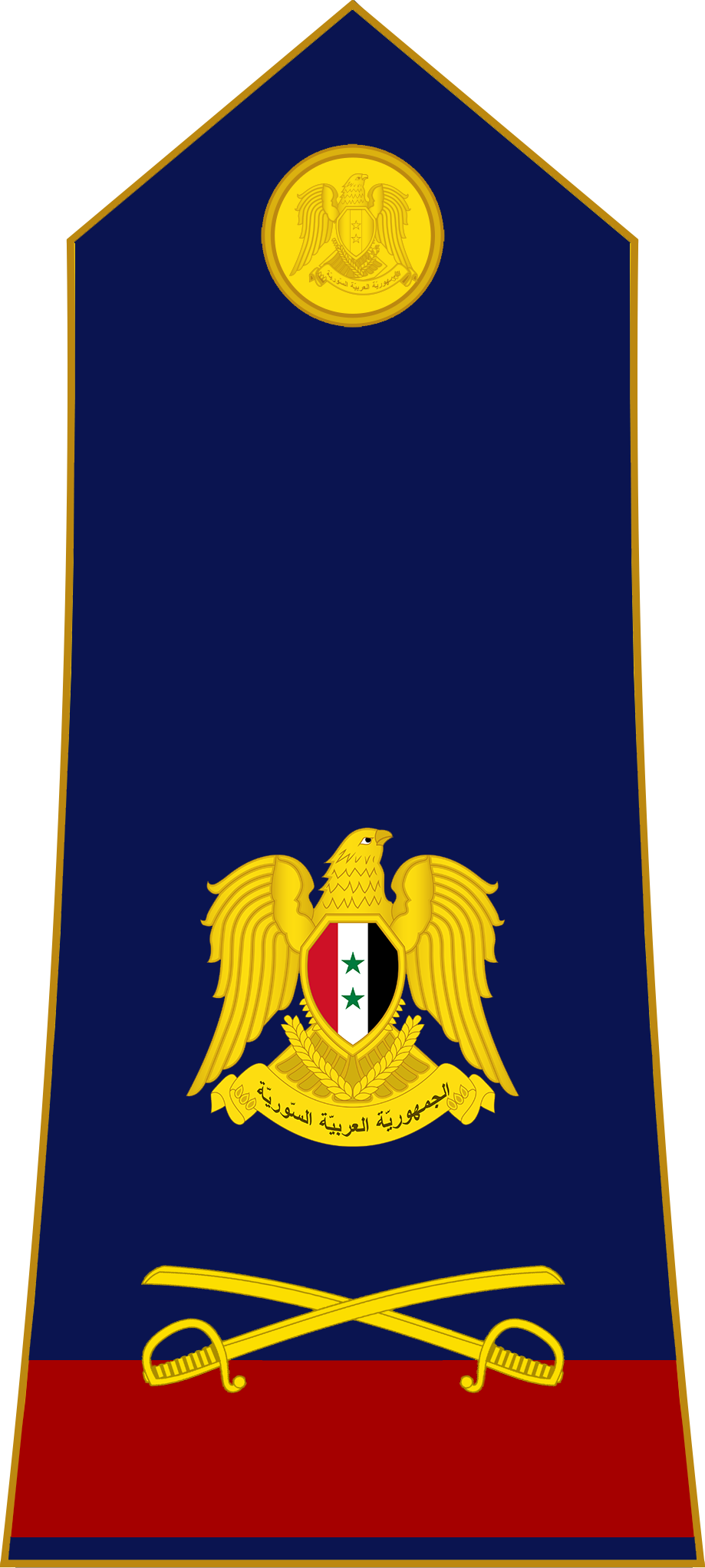
- Rank: Major General
- Battles/wars: Syrian civil war

Ghassan Jaoudat Ismail (Arabic: غَسَّان جَوْدَت اِسْمَاعِيْل, romanized: Ḡassān Jawdat Ismāʿīl) is the former head of the Syrian Air Force Intelligence Directorate.

Ismail was in command of the missions branch of the air force intelligence service, which, in cooperation with the special operations branch commands the elite shock troops of the air force intelligence service.

The Air Force Intelligence played an important role in the operations conducted by the Syrian government during the Syrian Civil War. As such, Ismail was one of the military leaders directly implementing the order of battle against opponents of Bashar al-Assad. On 8 July 2019, he was appointed head of the Air Force Intelligence unit.

Ismail was replaced as head of SAFI on 5 January 2024 by his deputy director Qahtan Khalil as part of the major reshuffle in Syria's security services. According to the Syrian Observer, Khalil's appointment was controversial due to his alleged role in the Darayya massacre and human rights violations.
