= AFID =

AFID may refer to:

- Democratic Yemeni Union of Peasants
- Air Force Intelligence Directorate, an intelligence service of Syria
- Alkali flame-ionization detector, a type of flame thermionic detector (FTD) used in gas chromatography
- Anti-felon identification system, a feature of some models of Taser
