= Kifah Moulhem =

Syrian politician and army general

- كفاح ملحم

Head of the Security Committee
- In office July 2018 – ca. October 2019
- Preceded by: Wafiq Nasser
- Succeeded by: Qahtan Khalil

Director of the National Security Bureau of the Regional Command
- In office 18 January 2024 – 8 December 2024
- General Secretary Deputy: Bashar al-Assad; Abdel-Fatah Qudsiyeh
- Preceded by: Mohammed Dib Zaitoun

Director of Military Intelligence Directorate
- In office 25 March 2019 – 18 January 2024
- Preceded by: Mohamed Mahala
- Succeeded by: Kamal Hassan

Personal details
- Born: 28 November 1961 (age 64) Junaynet Ruslan, Tartus Governorate, Syria
- Party: Ba'ath Party

Military service
- Allegiance: Ba'athist Syria
- Branch/service: Syrian Arab Army
- Years of service: 1980–2024
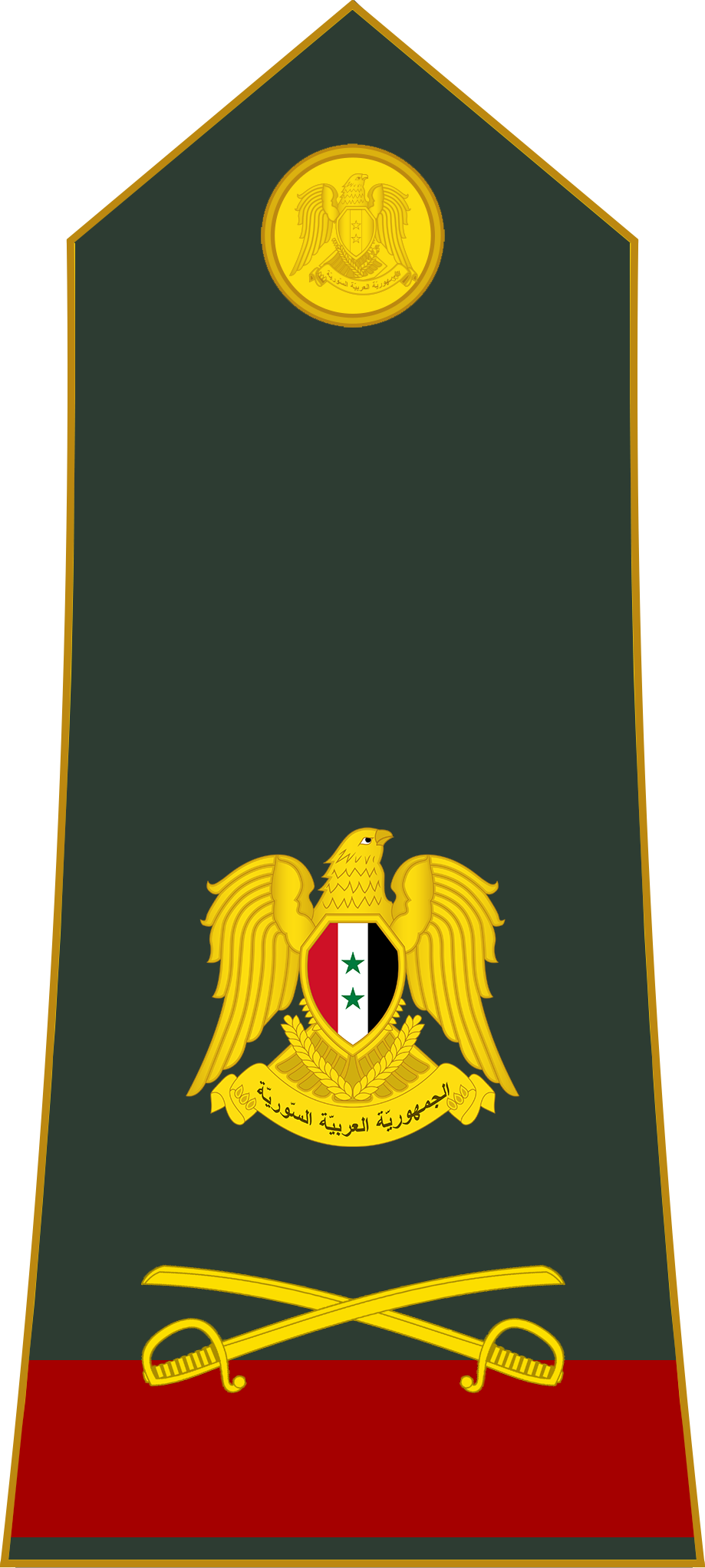
- Rank: Major General
- Unit: Mechanized Infantry; Military Intelligence
- Commands: Republican Guard (1980–1994); Military Intelligence Directorate (1994–2024); National Security Bureau (2024)
- Battles/wars: Syrian civil war

Kifah Moulhem (Arabic: كفاح ملحم; born 28 November 1961) is the former director of the Syrian National Security Bureau of the Ba'ath Party and a close adviser of Syrian former President Bashar al-Assad prior to the collapse of Ba'athist Syria. He is one of many officials sanctioned by the European Union for their actions against protesters participating in the Syrian civil war.

== Early life ==
Moulhem was born in Junaynet Ruslan, Tartus Governorate. He was recruited into the Republican Guard when Bassel al-Assad was leading it. "His first role was as a liaison officer" between Bassel and Prime Minister Mahmoud Al-Zoubi.

In 1994, Moulhem was transferred to the Military Intelligence Directorate as an intelligence officer, until 2008, when he was appointed as head of the Military Investigation Department (Branch 248), where he was in charge of investigating the political opposition.

== Syrian Civil War ==
After the start of the Syrian revolution in March 2011, Kifah Moulhem "participated in the suppression of demonstrations in Damascus and its countryside, commandeering the forces of Branch 248." "Military intelligence directorates in other provinces were known to regularly transfer their detainees to Branch 248 for investigation." At the end of 2012, Moulhem "was transferred to the coastal city of Latakia to serve as head" of the local Military Intelligence Branch.

Moulhem became known for "loyalty and cruelty"; he was "transferred to lead Aleppo’s Military Intelligence Branch, when the city’s security situation deteriorated in 2012". During the Battle of Aleppo, he led interrogations of captured rebels and jihadists, serving as the city's top intelligence chief.

In 2014, Moulhem was "appointed head of the information department in the MID, and in July of the following year he was promoted to the rank of Major- General" and was "appointed as deputy-chief of the MID." Three years later, in July 2018, he was appointed the "head of the security council in the southern region, which includes the provinces of Daraa, Quneitra and Suweida." In March 2019, Moulhem was appointed as director of the Military Intelligence Directorate, replacing Mohamed Mahala.

Following the fall of the al-Assad regime in December 2024, Moulhem reportedly fled Syria and escaped to Moscow.
