= Ali Duba =

Syrian Military and Intelligence Officer (1933–2023)

Lieutenant General Ali Duba
- علي دوبا
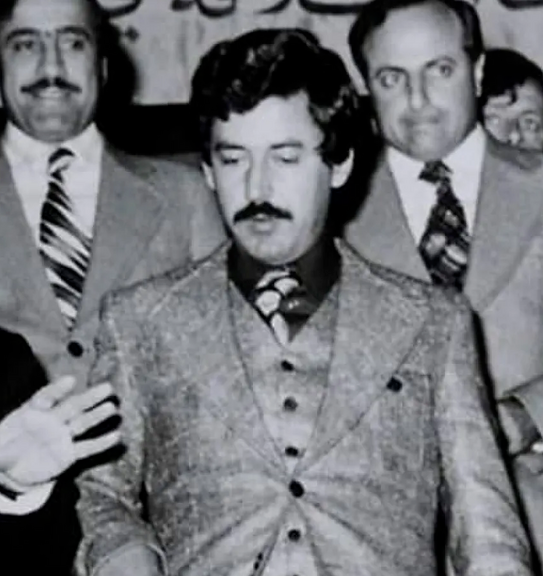
- Ali Duba in 1970s

Director of Military Intelligence Directorate
- In office 1973–2000
- President: Hafez al-Assad
- Preceded by: Hikmat al-Shihabi
- Succeeded by: Hassan Khalil

Personal details
- Born: Ali Issa Ibrahim Douba; 1933 Qurfays, Jableh District, Latakia Governorate, Syria
- Died: 21 June 2023 (aged 89) Latakia, Syria
- Party: Ba'ath Party

Military service
- Allegiance: Second Syrian Republic (1955–1958); United Arab Republic (1958–1961); Second Syrian Republic (1961–1963); Ba'athist Syria (1963–2000)
- Years of service: 1955–2000
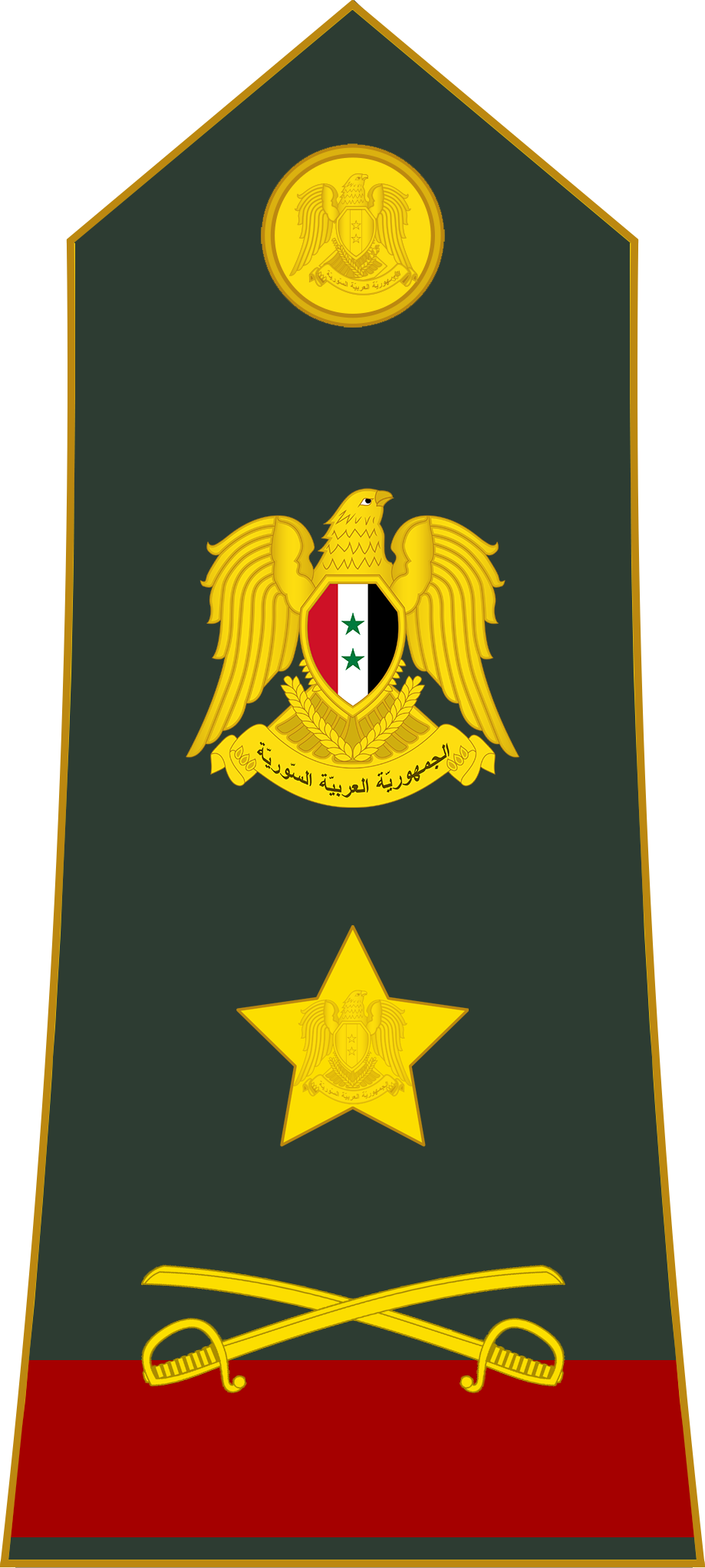
- Rank: Lieutenant General
- Unit: Military Intelligence
- Battles/wars: Six-Day War; Yom Kippur War; Lebanese civil war Islamist uprising in Syria

Ali Issa Ibrahim Duba (Arabic: علي عيسى ابراهيم دوبا, 1933 – 21 June 2023), better known as Ali Douba, was a Syrian military officer who was the head of the Military Intelligence Directorate under Hafez al-Assad as well as his close adviser. Under Douba’s leadership, the Military Intelligence Directorate was the most important security agency in Syria, responsible for maintaining security within the army and safeguarding the regime.

== Early life ==
Duba was born to a small landowning family from the Alawite tribe of Matawira, in the village of Qurfays in the Jableh District south of Latakia. He joined the Ba'ath Party in the early 1950s while studying at the Holy Land Secondary School in Latakia.

== Career ==
Duba joined the Syrian Army in 1955 and became the deputy head of internal security at the Damascus branch of the General Intelligence Directorate five years later. He served as military attaché at the Syrian embassy in Great Britain between 1964 and 1966, and in Bulgaria between 1967 and 1968.

Douba took part in suppressing the Muslim Brotherhood revolt in Hama during February 1982.

In 1999 he was pushed aside by Bashar al-Assad over fears that he could be a rival for the presidency, and was made to retire in February 2000.

He lived in Latakia until his death on 21 June 2023. EU Council Regulation 36/2012 placed him on a list of persons whose funds were frozen. His last public appearance occurred in May 2021 when he cast a vote for Bashar al-Assad in the 2021 Syrian presidential election.

== Death ==
Duba died on 21 June 2023 in a military hospital in Latakia at the age of 89.
