= Hikmat al-Shihabi =

Syrian Military Officer (1931–2013)

Colonel General Hikmat Shihabi
- حكمت الشهابي
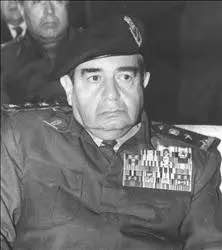
- Shihabi in the 1970s

Member of the Regional Command of the Syrian Regional Branch
- In office 7 January 1980 – 1 July 1998

16th Chief of Staff of the Syrian Army
- In office 12 August 1974 – July 1998
- Preceded by: Yusuf Shakkur
- Succeeded by: Ali Aslan

Head of Military Intelligence
- In office 1970–1973
- Preceded by: Ali Zaza
- Succeeded by: Ali Duba

Personal details
- Born: 8 January 1931 Al-Bab, Aleppo Governorate, Syria
- Died: 5 March 2013 (aged 82)
- Party: Ba'ath Party
- Awards: Hero of the Republic

Military service
- Allegiance: Second Syrian Republic (1952–1958); United Arab Republic (1958–1961); Second Syrian Republic (1961–1963); Ba'athist Syria (1963–1998)
- Branch/service: Syrian Arab Army
- Years of service: 1952–1998
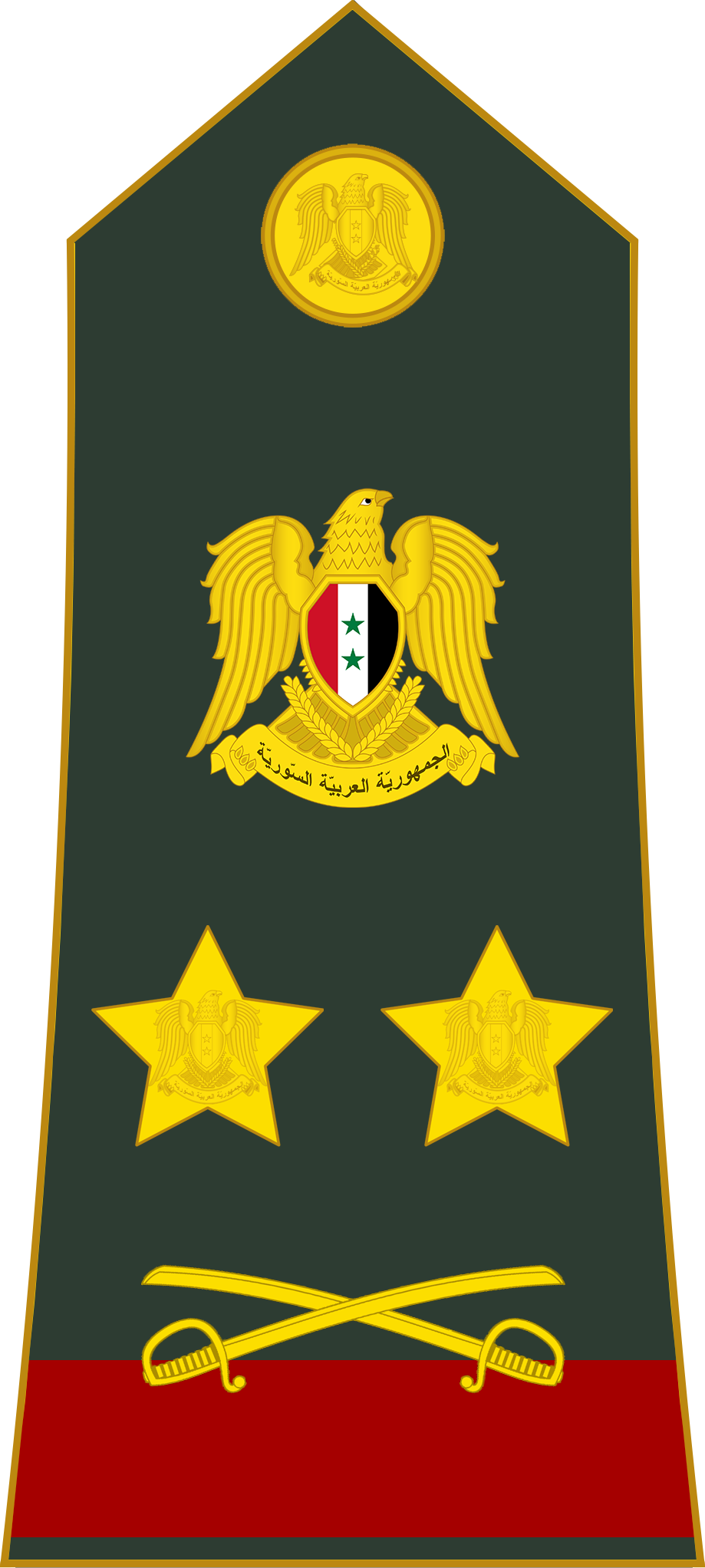
- Rank: Colonel General
- Unit: 10th Armoured Division
- Commands: 10th Armoured Division
- Battles/wars: Six-Day War; Yom Kippur War; Lebanese Civil War; Islamist uprising in Syria

Hikmat al-Shihabi (Arabic: حكمت الشهابي; 8 January 1931 – 5 March 2013) was a Syrian military officer who served as the chief of staff of the Syrian Army from 1974 to 1998. A Sunni Muslim, he was considered one of the few non-Alawite members of the inner circle of former Syrian President Hafez al-Assad.

== Early life and education ==
Shihabi was born into a Sunni family in 1931 in Al-Bab, Aleppo province. He attended Homs military academy and then had advanced military training in the United States.

== Career ==
Shihabi began his career in aviation, training in the Soviet Union and the United States. His term as chief of staff lasted until 1998.

Shihabii was also one of Ba'ath Party's four-member “old guard” members of the Regional Command.

=== Resignation ===
On 8 July 1998, after serving 24 years as army chief of staff, Shihabi resigned his position ahead of Hafez al-Assad’s death and was succeeded by Ali Aslan. Citing health issues and a heart condition, Shihabi explained his resignation to President Assad, who had wished to extend his service. In 2000, Syrian newspapers circulated rumors, later debunked, that Shihabi would be indicted on corruption charges.

=== Alliances ===
Shihabi was one of the senior Syrian officials who were close to late Rafik Hariri, former prime minister of Lebanon, and Lebanon's Druze leader Walid Jumblatt.

== Death ==
Shihabi died on 5 March 2013.
