= Darayya massacre =

Massacre by the Syrian government

- Part of the Syrian civil war
- Native name: مجزرة داريا
- Location: 33°27′N 36°15′E; Darayya, Rif Dimashq, Syria
- Date: 20–25 August 2012 (5 days)
- Deaths: 320 (Syrian Observatory for Human Rights)
- Perpetrators: Baathist Syria; Qahtan Khalil; Shabiha

The Darayya massacre (Arabic: مجزرة داريا) was a massacre carried out by Assad regime forces that occurred between 20 and 25 August 2012 in the town of Darayya in the Rif Dimashq province of Syria, during the Syrian civil war.

== Background ==
From the start of the conflict, the city of Darayya outside Damascus was one of the first hotspot for protesters against the government. The opposition in Darayya was one of the most pacifist in the country. When hundreds were arrested, locals took up arms. Two months before the massacre, the police and state intelligence had withdrawn from the town.

Soon after, 3,000 fighters from the Free Syrian Army (FSA) made Darayya their stronghold. They held a strategic position, situated on the edge of the military airport at Mezze, which was being used for air-strikes against rebel-held areas. Rebels and local residents reported opposition forces conducted mortar and rocket strikes against the base from Darayya. Also, a few days before the government attack, the rebels claimed to have killed 30 soldiers when they attacked a military checkpoint outside the town. According to local residents' account, the attack on the town started after talks for a prisoner swap between the rebels and the military had failed.

On 20 August 2012, the second day of Eid al-Fitr, Darayya was shelled. After that, hundreds of soldiers, backed by helicopters and armored vehicles entered Darayya, facing little resistance. Assad's forces cut off power and all means of communication. The last rebel group withdrew in the face of the military advance and opposition activists feared that young men suspected of being rebels could be executed. All the exits were closed and then the military started executing large numbers of people.

On 25 August, the bodies of 200 people were discovered in the town. Most of the dead appeared to be the result of executions. SOHR reported that the death toll had thus reached 270 killed during the four-day attack on Daraya, including children and rebels. 40–50 of the day's corpses had been discovered near a mosque. 80 of the dead had been identified as civilians, while 120 remained unidentified.

An activist inside the town said he had seen a young 8-year-old girl shot dead by army sniper fire. Residents said that government troops and "Shabiha militiamen" raided some streets "two or three times". In several instances, they demanded hospitality when entering people's homes and then killed their hosts after leaving.

Witnesses said that after the FSA fighters left the city, soldiers accompanied by "shabiha militia" members stormed in, raiding homes and arresting many, taking prisoners to the basements of empty buildings where they were shot execution-style, according to opposition accounts. Dozens were killed in Moadamyeh al-Sham, another Damascus suburb. The Syrian Observatory for Human Rights group said that 320 people were killed. The offensive against the town reportedly started with the military first surrounding Darayya, thus preventing civilians from escaping, then followed by several days of shelling and ending with house-to-house searches which resulted in executions. A video of one of the mass graves showed two small children near the edge. One resident said,

"The Assad forces killed them in cold blood...I saw dozens of dead people, killed by the knives at the end of Kalashnikovs, or by gunfire. The regime finished off whole families, a father, mother and their children. They just killed them without any pretext".

== Aftermath ==
An opposition activist said that the army returned to some Darayya neighborhoods on 27 August and raided them, leading to the deaths of additional residents. A shopkeeper in the city said that "We found more than 100 dead bodies in the Abu Suleiman Derane mosque and gathered around 200 from homes and the streets to bury them in a mass grave today because the town’s graveyard is already full, the regime killed whole families from Darayya to punish us," he added. A GlobalPost reporter described Darayya as a city of "ghosts and dead bodies".

In February 2013, the UN Commission of Inquiry found “reasonable grounds to believe that Government forces perpetrated the war crime of murder against hors de combat fighters and civilians taking no active part in hostilities, including women and children” during the August 2012 massacre, but the full range of crimes perpetrated during the attack has yet to be fully investigated.

An investigation by the Syrian British Consortium group in 2022 found that the regime forces had killed at least 700 people, including 63 children. The names of 514 victims of the massacre were confirmed during the investigation. It also revealed that Hezbollah and Iran took part in massacre.

Syrian Air Force Intelligence Directorate (SAFI) officer Qahtan Khalil later became widely known as the "Butcher of Darayya" for his leadership role in the massacre. In 2021, Khalil and other SAFI officers were sanctioned as Specially Designated Nationals by the United States for their role. Khalil was named head of SAFI in January 2024. Khalil's appointment was controversial due to his role in the Darayya massacre and human rights violations

== Reactions ==
- United Nations – Secretary-General Ban Ki-moon, stated the killings were "an appalling and brutal crime" and called for an immediate independent investigation. Navi Pillay said that she was "deeply shocked by the reports of the massacre in Darayya" and urged "an immediate and thorough investigation into this incident" whilst criticising the Syrian government for its use of heavy weapons, indiscriminate shelling and its reported bulldozing of houses, cautioning that these actions "may amount to war crimes and crimes against humanity".
- Egypt – President Mohamed Morsi called on for the Syrian president's allies to help push him out, saying that "Now is the time to stop this bloodshed and for the Syrian people to regain their full rights, and for this regime that kills its people to disappear from the scene."

== See also ==
- Halfaya massacre
- War crimes in the Syrian civil war
