= Far' Falastin =

Former jail in Damascus, Syria

Far' Falastine (Palestine Branch)
- Location in Damascus, Syria
- Location: Damascus, Syria; 33.491501°N 36.319008°E
- Status: Closed
- Opened: 1969
- Closed: 2024
- Managed by: Military Intelligence Directorate (Syria)
- Warden: Majid Ibrahim (2020–2024)

Notable prisoners
- Maher Arar, Mohammed Haydar Zammar, Abdullah Almalki, Nizar Nayyouf, Abbas Khan, Ahmad El-Maati, Muayyed Nureddin, Saïd Arif

Far' Falastine (Arabic: فرع فلسطين, lit. 'Palestine Branch'), also known as Branch 235, was a prison operated by Military Intelligence Directorate of Ba'athist Syria under the charge of Brig. Gen. Kamal Hassan between 2017 and 2020, located in Damascus, notorious for accounts of torture, coercive interrogation, and deplorable conditions related by its former detainees.

The Branch was established in 1969 as the liaison between the Ba'athist Syrian regime and the various Palestinian entities permitted to operate in Syria (Fatah, as-Sa'iqa, DFLP, and PFLP). Although it has been associated with torture at least since 1990, the prison gained widespread notoriety in the wake of the September 11 attacks due to detainees suspected of ties to terrorist organizations being sent there through extraordinary renditions, primarily by the United States, as a means of outsourcing torture. The detention center is reportedly quite large, run by some 500 employees, but the majority of the reports regarding torture and abusive interrogation focus on the three underground floors.

== Heads ==
- Brig. Gen. Ahmed Aboud (1970s–Early 1980s)
- Brig. Gen. Mazhar fares (1980s)
- Brig. Gen. Jamal al Yousef (1980s–1991)
- Brig. Gen. Mustafa Al-Tajer (1991–2000)
- Brig. Gen. Amin Sharabi (2000–2009)
- Brig. Gen. Mohamed Khalouf (2009–2014)
- Brig. Gen. Yassin Dahi (2014–2016)
- Brig. Gen. Kamal Hassan (2016–2020)
- Brig. Gen. Majid Ibrahim (2020–2024)

== Conditions ==
The cells are described as being the size of a coffin, or 2 by 1.5 meters.

The cells are infested with cockroaches, fleas, rats, mice, and lice. The scarce amount of food given to the prisoners causes extreme weight loss. Prisoners are given one bottle for urine and another for drinking water. Detainees are reportedly allowed out of their cells for a few minutes to use the restroom three times per day, except on Fridays when a longer break is allowed to take a shower and do laundry. Access to the prison yard for natural sunlight is limited to ten minutes per month. Medical care is denied completely as a matter of routine.

They brought me down to where the cells are and put me in a room that measured 2 by 1.5 meters. The ceiling was not high. They left me there by myself. I stayed in this cell the whole time I was detained. The cell had every kind of filth, cockroaches, fleas, the smell of dirt and mold. There was no toilet. There was just an old large Pepsi bottle filled with urine.

— Samir, imprisoned at Palestine Branch in 2011

There was a small opening in the ceiling, about one foot by two feet with iron bars. Over that was another ceiling, so only a little light came through this. There were cats and rats up there and from time to time the cats peed through the opening into the cell. There were two blankets, two dishes and two bottles. Nothing else. No light.

— Maher Arar, imprisoned at Palestine Branch from September 2002 to October 2003

== Sexual violence ==
The prison officers frequently threaten sexual violence, particularly gang rape, and occasionally carry it out.

They threatened to bring my mother. They asked whether I wanted them to bring my wife here and have all the guys sleep with her.

— Samir, imprisoned at Palestine Branch in 2011

They had a schedule. They would take turns with us. More than one man would rape you. It wasn't every day, but it was regular.

— Nour, detained at Palestine Branch in 2012.

== Beating ==
Methods of torture include the "German chair" (a metal chair frame used to stretch the spine), the "dulab" or "tire method" (in which the prisoner is made to place his head, legs, and arms through a car tire in order to immobilize him while he is beaten by the interrogator), "shabeh" hanging (where the detainee is suspended from the ceiling from by his wrists such that his toes are barely touching the ground), "falaqa" (where the detainee is laid on his back, his legs are lifted at a 90-degree angle, and the soles of his feet are beaten), electrocution, and others.

During torture sessions, the interrogators would severely beat a prisoner by resorting to the use of various tools and techniques. For example, Witness 1 was beaten with a hard plastic tube for several hours. He further describes how interrogators stuck pencils into the bodies of detainees and then purposefully broke the pencils so that a piece of the pencil remained stuck in the prisoner's flesh. Witness 3 reported an incident of a prisoner being beaten with a meat hook on a chain. Witness 2 testified that the interrogators poured cleaning chemicals on his body, which caused severe burns, and prevented him from washing it off. Other torture tools include cables, sticks, pipes as well as electric shocks.

== Former detainees ==
- Maher Arar
- Mohammed Haydar Zammar
- Abdullah Almalki
- Nizar Nayyouf
- Abbas Khan
- Ahmad El-Maati
- Muayyed Nureddin
- Saïd Arif
