= Nizar Nayyouf =

Syrian journalist (born 1962)

- Born: 29 May 1962 (age 64); Lattakia, Syria
- Education: University of Damascus
- Occupations: Journalist and activist
- Awards: Guillermo Cano World Press Freedom Prize; Golden Pen of Freedom Award; World Press Freedom Hero; Hellman-Hammett award

Nizar Nayyouf (also Nayuf or Nayouf; Arabic: نزار نيوف; born 29 May 1962) is a Syrian journalist, human rights activist, and dissident. He was one of the founding members of the Committee for the Defence of Democratic Freedom, a banned political organization in Syria, as well as editor-in-chief of صوت الديمقراطيِّة Sawt al-Democratiyya . He has criticized the Syrian government for human rights abuses, for which he was arrested and sentenced to ten years' imprisonment in 1991, most of which he spent in Mezzeh prison outside Damascus.

While in prison, Nayyouf was confined to isolation cells and tortured on a regular basis, which left him unable to walk. He was also denied cancer treatment unless he would recant his criticism of the government, but refused. On 6 May 2001, Syrian President Bashar al-Assad granted Nayyouf's release on humanitarian grounds on the date of Pope John Paul II's visit to Syria. Nayyouf subsequently moved to France, where he remains politically active and continues to call for democracy in Syria.

Nayyouf has won numerous awards for his work including the Guillermo Cano World Press Freedom Prize in 2000, and the Golden Pen of Freedom Award in 2001. He has been named a World Press Freedom Hero by the International Press Institute.

== Early life and work ==
Nayyouf was born in Lattakia, Syria, in 1962. He was educated at the University of Damascus, where he earned degrees in political economy and economic development. After university, Nayyouf pursued a career in journalism, beginning as a freelancer.

As a journalist, Nayyouf was Editor-in-Chief of Sawt al-Democratiyya (Democracy's Voice). He also co-founded the Committee for the Defence of Democratic Freedom (CDF), of which he is the former secretary-general. As one of the founding members, Nayyouf urged the CDF to remain independent of any political party. Nayyouf also contributed regularly to the Al-Hurriya Weekly. Nayyouf is married and has one daughter.

On 10 December 1991, the CDF published a four-page tract authored by Nayyouf, denouncing "the confiscation of public and democratic rights", the "daily aggressions of the security services" and "those who have been forgotten behind the prison-bars of martial law." In the tract, Nayyouf also criticizes how "a large number of our fellow-citizens were forced to take part in marches and ceremonies" and "people, especially shopkeepers and school children, were obliged to contribute financially to the decorations".

== Arrest and trial ==
In late 1991, Syrian authorities arrested Nayyouf's wife and young daughter in a crackdown on members of the CDF in order to pressure Nayyouf to give himself up. On 10 January 1992, Nayyouf surrendered to authorities. After his arrest, Nayyouf was tortured at the Palestine Branch of Syrian Military Intelligence. Many of Nayyouf's colleagues in the CDF were also arrested, and at least 17 were tried alongside Nayyouf by the Syrian Supreme State Security Court (SSSC) in proceedings lasting from 29 February to 27 March 1992.

In the trial, Nayyouf was connected with a CDF leaflet questioning the results of the uncontested presidential election of 1991 and calling attention to Syrian human rights violations. He was also accused of making false statements and accepting money from abroad. Provisions guaranteeing the rights of the accused under the Constitution of Syria are not binding on the SSSC, which tries political and national security cases, and lawyers representing Nayyouf and the other defendants were not allowed to meet with them before the trial. During the trial, the CDF defendants reported being tortured in custody, which the presiding judge ignored. International observers at Nayyouf's trial stated that it did not meet international standards of judicial fairness. As editor-in-chief of Sawt al-Democratiyya, Nayyouf received the harshest sentence of all the CDF members on trial. Nayyouf was sentenced on 17 March 1992 to 10 years of hard labour. He was sentenced for his membership in the CDF, which was banned under the Syrian regime, as well as "disseminating false information".

== Imprisonment ==
The first ten months of Nayyouf's sentence were served in Sednaya Prison outside Damascus. While at Sednaya, Nayyouf tried to organize a prisoner revolt. He was moved to Palmyra prison near Tadmur. In 1993, Nayyouf went on a thirteen-day hunger strike at Palmyra in order to protest the torture of prisoners. While at Palmyra, Nayyouf was able to pass evidence that the prisoners were being tortured to the press outside, which led to another transfer to Mezzeh prison, a military prison outside Damascus. Most of his ten-year sentence was spent in solitary confinement in Mezzeh.

At Mezzeh prison, Nayyouf was subjected to various forms of torture including electrocution, beatings, and being hung upside down from his feet for two or three hours at a time. He was reportedly urinated on for refusing to Hafez al-Assad, then-President of Syria. Nayyouf was also subjected to the "German chair", a rack-like device designed to stretch the spines of prisoners. Nayyouf was the target of attempted assassination in prison on three occasions, by a fight with another inmate and by arsenic poisoning as well as poisoning with other chemicals, which he survived in part because certain prison guards were sympathetic to him.

During his imprisonment, Nayyouf became partially paralysed from the legs down due to being tortured daily over the first two months, and could only move by crawling. In addition, while in prison, he was diagnosed with cancer, possibly Hodgkin's lymphoma, for which he was denied treatment unless he would promise to discontinue his political activism in Syria, which he refused. The Syrian ambassador to the United States Walid Muallem told Human Rights Watch that Nayyouf was only suffering from a slipped disc and that his health condition had improved. Muallem also stated that Nayyouf and CDF had "deliberately fabricated lies against Syria and caused her harm under the pretext of defending human rights". In 1999, after international pressure, Nayyouf was treated for Hodgkin's lymphoma.

Nayyouf was repeatedly told he would be released if he would sign a document recanting his criticism of the Syrian government, but also refused. In prison, Nayyouf continued to write and receive letters as well as send papers out by bribing prison guards.

While in prison, Nayyouf was the subject of significant attention from human rights organizations and received numerous international awards in journalism and press freedom. In 2000, Nayyouf was recognized by the International Press Institute as a World Press Freedom Hero. Nayyouf received the Guillermo Cano World Press Freedom Prize in 2001, while he was still jailed and in very poor health. During the Jury session for the Prize, Jury Chairman Oliver Clarke and the jury expressed his concern about Nizar Nayyouf, saying "We are deeply concerned for the very survival of Nizar Nayyouf. We understand that his condition has deteriorated and that his life is in danger". The jury issued a statement as well:

We, the members of the jury, hereby kindly request the Director-General of UNESCO to continue his efforts and discussions with the Syrian authorities so that a solution can be reached for the release of Mr Nayyouf on humanitarian grounds.

== Release ==
Various organizations, including UNESCO and the World Association of Newspapers, endeavoured to secure Nayyouf's release from prison on humanitarian grounds due to his precarious mental and physical condition. Syrian President Bashar al-Assad granted Nayyouf's release ten years after his initial imprisonment, on 6 May 2001 to coincide with the visit of Pope John Paul II to Syria. Nayyouf was released into house arrest at first, but on 20 June was seized by security agents outside a clinic where he was receiving treatment. International outcry ensued in response to the incident, which had occurred just as Nayyouf was planning to release information detailing Syrian human rights abuses, but the government denied involvement. However, Nayyouf was granted a full release and his travel ban was lifted, hours before President Bashar al-Assad was due to visit Paris. Nayyouf moved to France and then the UK, as he applied for political asylum, while he sought medical treatment for the injuries he suffered from torture during his confinement, which left him partially paralysed. In 2002, Nayyouf was granted political asylum in France. According to Nayyouf's attorney, lawyers for the ruling Ba'ath Party accused Nayyouf of "attempting to change the constitution by illegal means, creating sectarian strife, and publishing reports harmful for the state", and ordered him to appear in Syria for an investigation in September 1992. After his release, Nayyouf has continued to speak out against human rights violations in Syria, targeting torture, deaths in detention, and executions including the Tadmor Prison massacre on 27 June 1980, in which over 1,000 accused Islamists were executed at Palmyra prison. He joined the Syrian Democratic Coalition to advocate for democratic reforms.

On 26 May 2002, Nayyouf missed a planned appearance at the 55th World Freedom Congress in Bruges, Belgium, where he was to be formally presented with the Golden Pen of Freedom (an award he had won in 2000 while imprisoned), prompting widespread concern for his safety. Members of the Congress alerted police, who initiated an international search. On 27 May, he was found safe in a hospital near Brussels. According to Nayyouf, unknown persons took him from his hotel room and forced him into a car. He was driven for several hours before being left in a forest more than 100 kilometres (62 mi) away. He was found by a passerby in a car and taken to the hospital at Anderlecht, where police found him. Nayyouf accused the Syrian government of being behind the abduction, and stated that his abductors had offered to allow him to return to Syria if he would withdraw his claims of human rights abuses by the Assad government.

In 2004, Nayyouf gave an interview to the Dutch newspaper De Telegraaf in which he claimed that Iraqi dictator Saddam Hussein hid his arsenal of weapons of mass destruction in Syria before the United States invaded Iraq in 2003. Nayyouf claimed that officers of the Special Republican Guard organized the smuggling in collaboration with relatives of Bashar al-Assad including Dhu al-Himma Shalish and Assif Shoakat, who is also CEO of Bhaha, an import/export company owned by the Assad family. Nayyouf identified sites near the cities of al-Baida, Tell Sinan, and Sjinsjar as alleged holding sites for Iraqi WMDs.

In France in 2004, Nayyouf's apartment in Hauts-de-Seine was burgled and secret papers documenting relations between Iraq and a number of Western and Middle Eastern governments were stolen. At the time of the burglary, Nayyouf had been meeting with an official of the Ministry of the Interior about supplying those documents to the French government, a request which he refused.
