= Yusuf Shakkur =

Syrian army general (1926–2018)

Major General Yusuf Shakkur
- يوسف راغب شكور

Chief of the General Staff of the Army and Armed Forces
- In office 1972–1974
- President: Hafez al-Assad
- Preceded by: Mustafa Tlass
- Succeeded by: Hikmat al-Shihabi

Personal details
- Born: 1926 Homs, Syria
- Died: September 14, 2018 (aged 92) Damascus, Syria
- Party: Ba'ath Party

Military service
- Allegiance: First Syrian Republic (1946–1950); Second Syrian Republic (1950–1958); United Arab Republic (1958–1961); Second Syrian Republic (1961–1963); Ba'athist Syria (1963–1974)
- Branch/service: Syrian Arab Army
- Years of service: 1946–1974
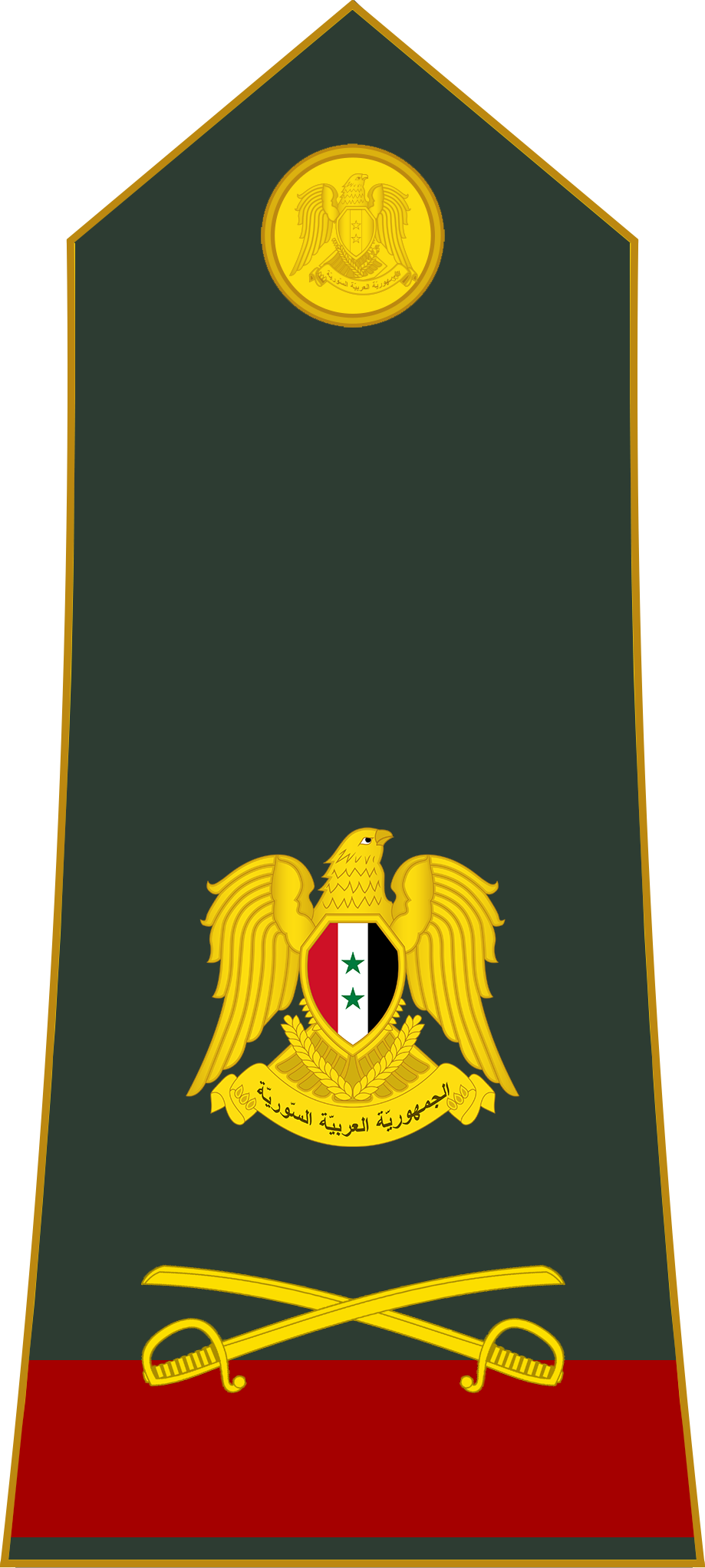
- Rank: Major general
- Battles/wars: Six-Day War; Yom Kippur War

Yusuf Raghib Shakkur (Arabic: يوسف راغب شكور; 1926–2018) was a Syrian military officer who served as the Chief of the General Staff of the Syrian Army during the Yom Kippur War in October 1973. As the highest-ranking military officer under President Hafez al-Assad, he was directly responsible for the planning and execution of the Syrian military's operations during the conflict.

== Career ==
Shakkur was born in 1926 near the city of Homs. After graduating from high school, he began studying at the Homs Military Academy. He then took an artillery officer course in France, like many officers in the Syrian army at the time. He later pursued higher military studies in the Soviet Union.

Shakkur rose through the ranks of the Syrian military, which was undergoing significant political and structural changes in the post-independence era. His career advanced following the 1963 Syrian coup d'état which brought the Ba'ath Party to power, and he became a trusted senior officer under the leadership of Minister of Defense Hafez al-Assad. From 1961 to 1964, Shakkur served as Syria's consul general in Venezuela and Brazil due to his multilingual ability.

Appointed as Chief of the General Staff in 1972, he worked closely with the political-military leadership to coordinate strategy with their Egyptian allies in the lead-up to the Yom Kippur War.

During the war, Shakkur was responsible for overseeing the Syrian Army's initial offensive into the Golan Heights, which achieved significant early success before being halted by Israeli forces. The subsequent Israeli counter-offensive pushed Syrian forces back towards the outskirts of Damascus. As Chief of Staff, Shakkur was central to directing Syrian military operations throughout this period.

Following the war, which ended in a stalemate on the Syrian front, Shakkur was replaced as Chief of the General Staff in 1974 by Hikmat al-Shihabi, as part of a broader post-war reassessment of the military leadership by Hafez al-Assad.

In 1978, he was appointed as Syria's ambassador to France.
