= Mohammed Haydar Zammar =

Syrian-German militant (born 1961)

Mohammed Haydar Zammar محمد حيدر زمار
- Born: 1961; Aleppo, Syria
- Arrested: October 2001; Morocco; Moroccan police
- Died: June 19, 2025 (aged 63–64)
- Citizenship: German
- Detained at: Far' Falastin prison, Damascus, Syria
- Alleged to be a member of: Formerly Al-Qaeda, later Islamic State
- Status: Deceased

Mohammed Haydar Zammar (Arabic: محمد حيدر زمار Muḥammad Ḥaydar Zammār) (1961 - June 19, 2025) was a Syrian-German militant who served as an important al-Qaida recruiter, and a member of the Islamic State. He claimed to have recruited many of the organizers of the September 11 attacks. He was detained in Far' Falastin.

== Early history ==
Zammar was born in Syria to a religious Muslim family historically linked to the Muslim Brotherhood in Syria. At ten he moved to Germany. He trained in metalworking and planned to work for Mercedes-Benz. Instead he worked as a translator in Saudi Arabia, and a truck-driver in Hamburg. In 1991, he flew to Afghanistan by way of Pakistan and underwent a training program for mujahideen fighters. His training included weapons knowledge, use of explosives, and advanced tactics. He was moved to an elite training camp near Jalalabad and after a year, returned to Hamburg.

Zammar travelled extensively over the next few years. While working as a mechanic, he took long trips to Syria, Jordan, Turkey, and Sweden. In 1995, he traveled to Bosnia to fight there. And in 1996, Zammar visited Afghanistan for a second time, this time to become a formal member of the organisation called al-Qaeda. He was reported to have been personally invited by Osama bin Laden.

== Recruiter for al-Qaida ==
When Zammar returned to Hamburg, he became an Islamic preacher. Der Spiegel described him, in 2002, as an imposing figure who frequently gave enthusiastic speeches on behalf of bin Laden and other Islamists. German police began to investigate him at this time, long before al-Qaeda's attacks on 9-11. Zammar made frequent short trips to Afghanistan throughout this period.

Mohamed Atta became friends with Zammar around 1998. Zammar reportedly boasted that he personally recruited Atta and other hijackers into al-Qaida. Zammar also met frequently with Mounir El Motassadeq around this time.

In 1998 Germany intensified their surveillance of Zammar. He was trailed, his phone was tapped and his calls were recorded. German authorities shared this information with the CIA, including Zammar's phone conversations with hijackers Marwan al-Shehhi, Mohamed Atta, Ramzi bin al-Shibh, and Said Bahaji.

Atta, Shehhi, and bin al-Shibh formed the Hamburg cell in November 1998, and Zammar is reported to have been a frequent visitor. Atta became the group leader, and Zammar was seen as a valuable conduit for international contacts.

In the Summer of 1999, U.S. intelligence discovered that Zammar was in direct contact with one of bin Laden's senior operational coordinators. The U.S. apparently did not share this information with German intelligence. Zammar is also known to have met frequently with Said Bahaji in Germany in 2000.

== Capture ==
On October 27, 2001, Zammar traveled to Morocco. Not long afterwards, he was arrested by Moroccan police with the assistance of the U.S. Although he was a German citizen and under investigation by Germany, German intelligence only learned about the arrest from the newspapers in June 2002.

Instead of being deported to the U.S. or Germany, Zammar was secretly sent to Syria for indefinite detention in the notorious Far'Falastin detention center in Damascus. Time Magazine reported: "U.S. officials in Damascus submit written questions to the Syrians, who relay Zammar's answers back. . . State Department officials like the arrangement because it insulates the U.S. government from any torture the Syrians may be applying to Zammar."

On December 15, 2005, it was officially confirmed that German Bundeskriminalamt federal police officers had on at least one occasion participated in Zammar's interrogation in Syria; it was claimed that these officers were unaware of the conditions at the prison. This seems doubtful given that it was widespread knowledge in the intelligence/international politics community, but if referring specifically to the treatment of Zammar, it may or may not be true; it is not known whether Zammar's interrogation by Syria or other parties did or does involve torture and if so, to which extent.

According to Amnesty International, Muhammad Haydar Zammar was a victim of the US-led renditions programme who was convicted in February 2007 after an unfair trial before the Syrian Supreme State Security Court. Amnesty also alleged that he was held in pre-trial detention for almost five years, much of it in incommunicado and solitary confinement, at the notorious Palestine Branch of Military Intelligence in Damascus. During his detention he was tortured and otherwise ill-treated. In June 2007 the UN Working Group on Arbitrary Detention stated that Muhammad Haydar Zammar was detained arbitrarily and called upon the Syrian authorities to "remedy the situation". Amnesty International was not aware of the authorities having taken any steps to do so.

== Release ==
Zammar was released as part of a prisoner exchange between the Islamist Syrian rebel group Ahrar al-Sham and the Syrian Government in September 2013. A member of the negotiating team told Der Spiegel that days after being released, Zammar travelled to the Syrian city of Raqqa and joined the Islamic State (IS). He reportedly organised for funds to be sent to the Sinai-based militant group Ansar Bayt al-Maqdis, and negotiated for the group to swear allegiance to IS.

== Recapture ==
Zammar was recaptured by members of the Kurdish People's Protection Units (YPG) in March 2018 near the village of Darnij in Deir al-Zour. He was being held in Hasakah prison in Qamishli, northeastern Syria, from where he gave an interview to The Washington Post in 2018.

== Death ==
Zammar died on June 19, 2025, at the age of 64, while in custody at Hasakah prison. According to reports from the German news magazine Der Spiegel, his death was caused by medical complications from tuberculosis combined with heart failure, exacerbated by the harsh conditions of his confinement.

== See also ==
- Abu Hamza al-Masri
- Khalid El-Masri
- Abu Omar case
