= Yassin Dahi =

Syrian military officer

- Born: 1961 (age 64–65)
- Military career
- Allegiance: Ba'athist Syria
- Branch: Syrian Arab Armed Forces (Ba'athist Syria)
- Rank: Brigadier General
- Conflicts: Syrian civil war

Yassin Ahmed Dahi (born 10th October 1961) is a former Syrian military officer and a senior figure in the Military Intelligence Directorate of Ba'athist Syria. He has held multiple high-ranking positions in Syria’s security apparatus and has been implicated in human rights abuses during the Syrian Civil War. Due to his role in the suppression of opposition movements and alleged involvement in torture, he has been sanctioned by the United States and the European Union.

== Early life ==
Yassin Ahmed Dahi was born in 1961 in the village of Al-Khariba, located in Tartous Governorate, Syria.

== Military career ==
Dahi held many roles in Syria's military intelligence departments, serving as the head of Deir Ezzor's Military Intelligence branch from October 2013 to April 2014, and as the head of the Palestine Branch in Damascus until October 2014, when he became the head of the Homs branch.

Dahi participated in many massacres at the Homs branch, resulting in the deaths of over 40 people from October 2014 until mid-2016.

== Human rights allegations ==
Dahi was involved in the 2013 chemical attack that killed about 1,500 people and participated in massacres and arbitrary arrests in eastern Ghouta. Due to his crimes against civilians, Yassin Ahmed Dahi has been targeted by international sanctions.

In early 2017, the United States imposed sanctions on Dahi, with the European Union and the United Kingdom following suit in July 2017, adding Dahi to its sanctions list, and imposing an asset freeze on him for his role in orchestrating crackdowns against civilians and political dissidents.

Human rights organizations, including Amnesty International and Human Rights Watch, have cited Dahi’s involvement in grave human rights abuses. Reports indicate that detainees held under his supervision were subjected to inhumane treatment, including severe beatings, electrocution, and other forms of torture.

== Retirement and exile ==
Dahi retired before the Fall of the Assad regime and lived in Damascus until fleeing to Dubai, where he ran out of funds and was threatened with extradition to Syria. He suffers from a heart condition.

== See also ==
- Mohamed Khalouf
- Human rights in Syria
- Far' Falastin
