= Wafiq Nasser =

Former head of the Military Intelligence Directorate in Aleppo

Chief of Military Intelligence in Suwayda
- In office October 2011 – 2018
- Preceded by: Suhail Ramadan

Chief of Military Intelligence in Hama
- Incumbent
- Assumed office 2018

Chief of Military Intelligence in Aleppo
- In office 2022–2023

Head of the Security Committee
- In office July 2012 – November 2017
- Succeeded by: Kifah Moulhem

Military service
- Allegiance: Ba'athist Syria
- Battles/wars: Syrian civil war

Wafiq Nasser is a Syrian former intelligence officer who served as the regional head of the Military Intelligence Directorate in various governorates from 2011 until 2023.

== Career ==
He served as a colonel in the Republican Guard in the early years of the Syrian Civil War and took part in raids on Daraa.

Nasser was the Chief of Military Intelligence in Suwayda from October 2011 until 2018.

He was appointed the head of the Security Committee in southern Syria, which he headed from 2012 until 2017.

Nasser and the Military Intelligence Directorate were given control of Aleppo in April 2022, following the failure of the General Intelligence Directorate to retain control.

He was forced into retirement in January 2023.

== Sanctions ==
The United States Department of the Treasury sanctioned him in July 2021.
