= Hassan Khalil =

Former Head of Syrian Military Intelligence Directorate

- حسن خليل

Head of Military Intelligence Directorate
- In office 2000–2005
- President: Bashar al-Assad
- Prime Minister: Muhammad Mustafa Mero; Muhammad Naji al-Otari
- Preceded by: Ali Duba
- Succeeded by: Assef Shawkat

Deputy Director of Military Intelligence
- In office 1993–2000
- Prime Minister: Mahmoud Al-Zoubi

Personal details
- Born: Latakia, Syria
- Died: Damascus, Syria
- Party: Ba'ath Party

Military service
- Allegiance: Ba'athist Syria
- Branch/service: Syrian Arab Army

Hassan Khalil (Arabic: حسن خليل) is the former Head of the Military Intelligence Directorate of Ba’athist Syria, serving from 2000 to 2005. He previously held the position of deputy director from 1993 to 2000.

Prior to the Syrian civil war, Khalil was a key figure in Syria’s efforts to improve relations with the United States and the West, using intelligence sharing as a significant element for cooperation.

== Controversies ==
=== Implication in Rafic Hariri assassination ===
Hassan Khalil was one of several high-ranking Syrian government and military officials identified in a draft of the United Nations Mehlis Report, which was mistakenly released as a Microsoft Word document retaining all edits since its creation. This draft implicated them in the assassination of Rafic Hariri. However, the final Mehlis Report did not specifically name any Syrian government officials as responsible for the assassination. The Syrian ambassador to Washington, Imad Mustafa, criticized the report, stating it was “full of political rumors, gossip, and hearsay.”

=== Role in quelling civilian opposition in Syrian civil war ===
Syrian President Bashar al-Assad relied on Hassan Khalil in his capacity as head of Military Intelligence, to quel internal dissent with an "iron fist" during the Syrian uprising.
