= Rafiq Shahadah =

Syrian Army major general (born 1956)

- رفيق شحادة

Director of Military Intelligence Directorate
- In office July 2012 – March 2015
- Preceded by: Abdel-Fatah Qudsiyeh
- Succeeded by: Mohamed Mahala

Personal details
- Born: 5 January 1956 (age 70) Jableh, Latakia Governorate, Syria

Military service
- Allegiance: Ba'athist Syria
- Branch/service: Syrian Army
- Years of service: 1977–2018
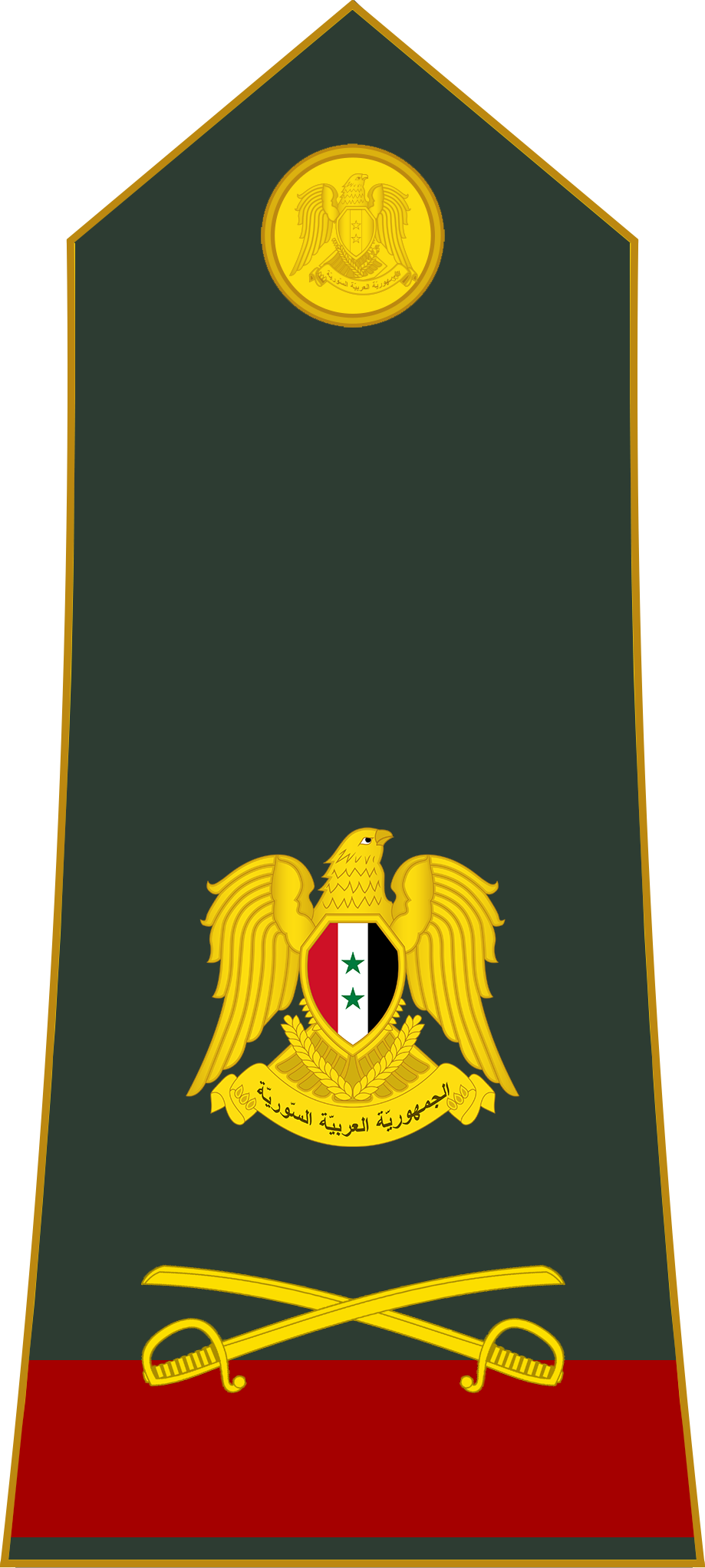
- Rank: Major general
- Battles/wars: Syrian civil war

Rafiq Shahadah (Arabic: رفيق شحادة, born 5 January 1956) is a retired Syrian Army major general. He was head of the Military Intelligence Directorate and the chief of staff of the Syrian Army's operations in Eastern Syria.

== Early life ==
Shahadah was born in Jableh, Latakia Governorate, in 1956.

== Career ==
Major General Rafiq Shahadah was the most prominent bodyguard of President Hafez al-Assad, up until his death in 2000. He also served in the Republican Guard, and later headed the Political Security Division in Damascus. He then moved to lead the Military Intelligence Directorate, taking over one of its most powerful branches, Officers Affairs Branch 293. Those close to him talk about his extreme toughness.

In 2011, Shahadah was an adviser to President Bashar al-Assad on strategic questions and military intelligence. After start of the Early insurgency phase of the initial phase of Syrian war, Shahadah was serving as a security official in Homs. During his tenure Marie Colvin, a war correspondent, was killed in an attack in February 2012 which was confirmed by Shahadah who stated "Marie Colvin was a dog and now she’s dead. Let the Americans help her now."

Shahadah was appointed chief of the Military Intelligence Directorate in July 2012, replacing Abdul Fatah Qudsiya, who then became the deputy director of the National Security Bureau.

In 2015, Shahadah was dismissed from his role as director of Military Intelligence Directorate, following a dispute with Lt. General Rustum Ghazaleh. After him, Mohamed Mahala was appointed to the post. Until 1 January 2018, Shahadah was head of the Military Security Committee in Deir Ezzor. In July 2020, Shahadah was named as the head of the military office at the Syrian Presidency.

== Sanctions ==
On 24 August 2011, the European Union sanctioned Shahada and stated that he was the head of military intelligence's branch 293 which is charged with internal affairs in Damascus. The EU accused him of being "directly involved in repression and violence against the civilian population." The same day, the Treasury of the United Kingdom also froze his assets. The Swiss government sanctioned him the following month based on the reasons given by the EU. Canada banned him from the country in October 2011.
