= Military Intelligence Directorate (Syria) =

Former Syrian intelligence agency

- شعبة المخابرات العسكرية; Shu'bat al-Mukhabarat al-'Askariyya

Agency overview
- Formed: 1945 (first); 1969 (second)
- Preceding agency: Second Bureau
- Dissolved: 8 December 2024 (de facto); 29 January 2025 (de jure)
- Jurisdiction: Government of Syria
- Headquarters: Defense Ministry headquarters, Umayyad Square, Damascus, Syria
- Agency executives: Kamal Hassan (2024), Director; Mufid Khadour (2024), Deputy Director
- Parent agency: Ministry of Defense

The Military Intelligence Directorate (MID; Arabic: شعبة المخابرات العسكرية, romanized: Shu'bat al-Mukhabarat al-'Askariyya) was the military intelligence agency of Ba'athist Syria until 2024. Although its roots go back to the French mandate period, the organization was established in 1969. Its predecessor organization was called the Second Bureau. It was headquartered at the Defense Ministry building in Damascus. The military intelligence agency was very influential in the politics of Ba'athist Syria.

== Organization ==
The Military Intelligence Directorate was under the jurisdiction of the Ministry of Defense. The MID was also controlled by the former President Bashar al-Assad through the National Security Bureau of the Arab Socialist Ba'ath Party Central Command. It was divided into eleven branches:

- Technical (Computers) Branch (Branch 211)
- Raids and Storming Branch (Branch 215)
- Patrols Branch (Branch 216)
- Front Intelligence Branch (Branch 220)
- Internal and External Communications Branch (Branch 225)
- Palestine Branch (Branch 235)
- Wireless Branch (Branch 237)
- Political Guidance Branch (Branch 248)
- External Security Branch (Branch 279)
- Officers Affairs Branch (Branch 293)
- Armed Forces Security Branch (Branch 294)

=== Responsibility ===
The MID was responsible for providing clandestine and covert operations, counterinsurgency, counterintelligence, counter-revolutionary, counterterrorism, executive protection, military intelligence gathering on foreign and internal threats to the deposed Government of Syria, the former Syrian Armed Forces or the national security of Syria, irregular warfare, and political warfare. The service also monitored opponents of the former government inside/outside Ba'athist Syria.

MID was both a foreign intelligence gathering and a military security (counterintelligence) service. During the Syrian occupation of Lebanon, the Mukhabarat exercised political authority in Lebanon until the Cedar Revolution and subsequent Syrian withdrawal in 2005. It was suspected of providing logistic and material support to different Palestinian or Lebanese radical groups.

== Directors ==
- Abdel Hamid al-Sarraj (1954–1958)
- Salah Nasr (1958–1961)
- Rashid al-Qutayni (1961–1963)
- Ahmed Suidani (1963–1965)
- Ali Zaza (1965–1970)

- Deputy Director: Hikmat al-Shihabi (1968–1970)

- Hikmat al-Shihabi (1970–1973)

- Deputy Director: Ali Duba (1971–1973)

- Ali Duba (1973–2000)

- Deputy Director: Hassan Khalil (1993–2000)

- Hassan Khalil (2000–2005)

- Deputy Director: Assef Shawkat (2000–2005)

- Assef Shawkat (2005–2009)

- Deputy Director: Saeed Sammour (2005–2009)

- Abdel-Fatah Qudsiyeh (July 2009–July 2012)

- Head of Internal Affairs (branch 293): Rafiq Shahadah (2011)

- Rafiq Shahadah (July 2012 – March 2015)
- Mohamed Mahala (March 2015 – March 2019)

- Deputy Director: Kifah Moulhem (March 2015 – March 2019)

- Kifah Moulhem (March 2019 – 18 January 2024)

- Deputy Director: Kamal Hassan (July 2023 – 18 January 2024)

- Kamal Hassan (18 January – 8 December 2024)

- Deputy Director: Mufid Khadour (18 January – 8 December 2024)

=== Regional Directors ===
- Rif Dimashq (Branch 227):
  - Lt. Gen. Rustum Ghazali (2005 – 25 July 2012), the European Union sanctioned him for being involved in violence against the civilian population during the Syrian uprising. Accused of ordering or committing crimes against humanity by Human Rights Watch.
  - Brig. Gen. Kamal Hassan (2020–2023)
    - Amjad Youssef, Branch 227 deputy director until 2021 and accused perpetrator of the Tadamon massacre.
- Damascus (Branch 215):
  - Brig. Gen. Sha'afiq (2012) accused of ordering or committing crimes against humanity.
- Damascus (Branch 235 a.k.a. "Palestine Branch"):
  - Brig. Gen. Ahmed Aboud (1970s–Early 1980s)
  - Brig. Gen. Mazhar fares (1980s)
  - Brig. Gen. Jamal al Yousef (1980s–1991)
  - Brig. Gen. Mustafa Al-Tajer (1991–2000)
  - Brig. Gen. Amin Sharabi (2000–2009)
  - Brig. Gen. Mohamed Khalouf (2009–2014) accused of ordering or committing crimes against humanity.
  - Brig. Gen. Yassin Dahi (2014–2016)
  - Brig. Gen. Kamal Hassan (2016–2020)
  - Brig. Gen. Majid Ibrahim (2020–2024)
- Damascus (Branch 248): Brig. Gen. Yousef Abdou (2012) accused of ordering or committing crimes against humanity.
- Damascus (Branch 290): Brig. Gen. Wafiq Nasser (2017–2018)
- Damascus (Branch 291): Brig. Gen. Burhan Qadour (past–2012) accused of ordering or committing crimes against humanity.
- Hama (Branch 219):
  - Mohammad Mufleh (2011), the European Union sanctioned him for being involved in the crackdown on demonstrators during the Syrian uprising.
  - Brig. Gen. Wafiq Nasser (2018–2020)
  - Brig. Gen. Ibrahim Abbas (2021–2024)
- Deir ez-Zor (Branch 243):
  - Jameh Jameh (2011–2013), the European Union sanctioned him for being directly involved in repression and violence against the civilian population in Deir ez-Zor and Abu Kamal during the Syrian uprising.
- Idlib (Branch 271):
  - Brig. Gen. Nawful Al-Husayn (2011), the European Union sanctioned him for being directly involved in repression and violence against the civilian population in Idlib province during the Syrian uprising. Accused of ordering or committing crimes against humanity.
- Homs (Branch 261):
  - Muhammed Zamrini (2011), the European Union sanctioned him for being directly involved in repression and violence against the civilian population in Homs during the Syrian uprising. Accused of ordering or committing crimes against humanity.
  - Brig. Gen. Emad Mayhoub (2020–2024)
- Tartus city branch:
  - Brig. Gen. Emad Mayhoub (2018–2020)
- Daraa (Branch 245):
  - Brig. Gen. Louay al-Ali (2011–8 December 2024), the European Union sanctioned him for being responsible for the violence against protesters in Daraa during the Syrian uprising. Accused of ordering or committing crimes against humanity.
- Suwayda branch:
  - Brig. Gen. Suheir Ramadan (?–2011)
  - Brig. Gen. Wafiq Nasser (2011–2017)
- Aleppo (Branch 290):
  - Muhammad Duba (1974–1979)
  - Brig. Gen. Wafiq Nasser (2020–2024)
- Tadmur (Branch 221)
- Al-Hasakah (Branch 222)

== Paramilitary units ==
- Military Security Shield Forces
  - Military Security Falcons
  - Southern Shield Brigade
- Al-Assad Shield Forces
- Desert Commandos Regiment
  - Lions of Hamidiya
- Forces of the Fighters of the Tribes
- Popular Resistance of the Eastern Region
- Syrian Resistance
  - Falcons of the Jazira and Euphrates

== Other Syrian intelligence agencies ==
- National Security Bureau
- Air Force Intelligence Directorate
- General Intelligence Directorate
- Political Security Directorate
