= Qahtan Khalil =

Syrian military official

- قحطان خلیل

Director of Air Force Intelligence Directorate
- In office 5 January 2024 – 8 December 2024
- Preceded by: Ghassan Ismail

Head of the Security Committee
- In office October 2019 – November 2019
- Succeeded by: Hossam Louka

Personal details
- Born: 1 July 1964 (age 62)

Military service
- Allegiance: Ba'athist Syria
- Branch/service: Syrian Air Force
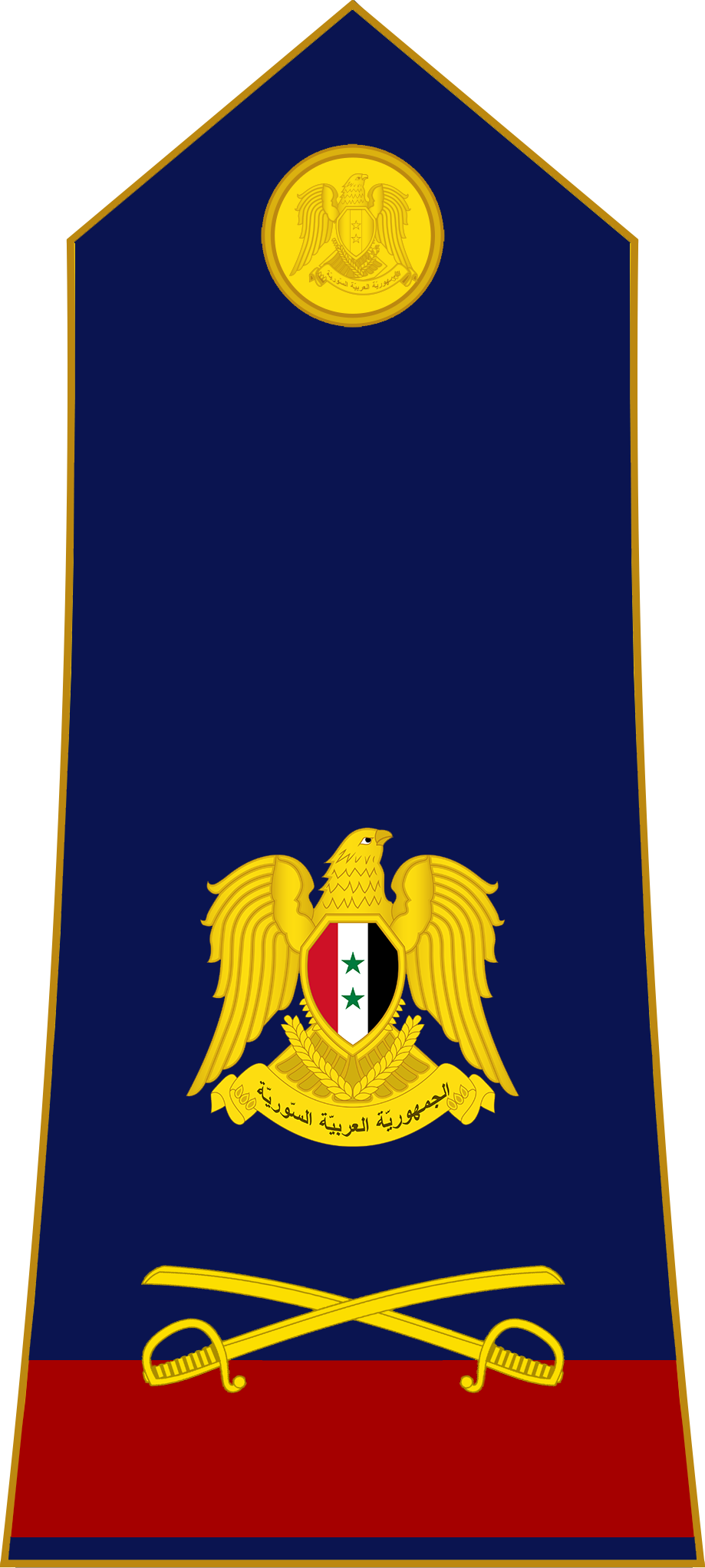
- Rank: Major General
- Battles/wars: Syrian civil war

Qahtan Khalil (born 1 July 1964) is a Syrian military official who served as the head of the Air Force Intelligence Directorate (SAFI) from January to December 2024 during the final months of the Assad regime. Known as the "Butcher of Daraya" for his direct role in commanding the 2012 Darayya massacre that resulted in hundreds of civilian deaths, Khalil was among several SAFI officials designated by the U.S. Treasury Department as a Specially Designated National for his direct role in the massacre and subsequent violations of human rights.

== Biography ==
Khalil was born on 1 July 1964. He is widely-known as the "Butcher of Daraya" due to his direct responsibility in leading the 2012 Darayya massacre that left hundreds of people dead. In July 2018, Khalil was promoted to major general and appointed head of the security committee in southern Syria in October 2019 as part of the Assad regime's strategy to increase control in Daraa Governorate.

For his role in the Darayya massacre and involvement in human rights violations including torture and detainee liquidation at the prison on Mezzeh Air Base and at the Air Force Intelligence Investigation Branch at Mezzeh Airport, the U.S. imposed sanctions on Khalil under the Caesar Act in December 2021. Khalil was one of several Syrian Air Force Intelligence Directorate (SAFI) officials sanctioned by the U.S. Department of Treasury as a Specially Designated National for direct responsibility in the 2012 massacre.

Khalil held the post of Deputy Director of SAFI before his appointment al-Assad as the head of the directorate on 5 January 2024, replacing Ghassan Ismail, as part of the major reshuffle in Syria's security services. According to the Syrian Observer, Khalil's appointment was controversial due to his alleged role in the Darayya massacre and human rights violations.

The Levant News reported that Khalil was the target of an assassination attempt in Tadmur on 6 May 2024. He was reportedly taken to the Tishreen Military Hospital in Damascus for surgery.

According to the Associated Press, Khalil was considered in al-Assad's inner cicle of security officials. During the fall of the al-Assad regime in December 2024, Khalil, along with several other senior officials including Ali Abbas and Ali Ayyoub, boarded a Syrian Air Yak-40 jet at around 1:30 a.m., which flew them to the Hmeimim Air Base before they were transported onward to Moscow under Russian military protection.

== See also ==
- List of massacres during the Syrian civil war
