= Air Force Intelligence Directorate =

Former Syrian intelligence agency

- إدارة المخابرات الجوية; Idarat al-Mukhabarat al-Jawiyya
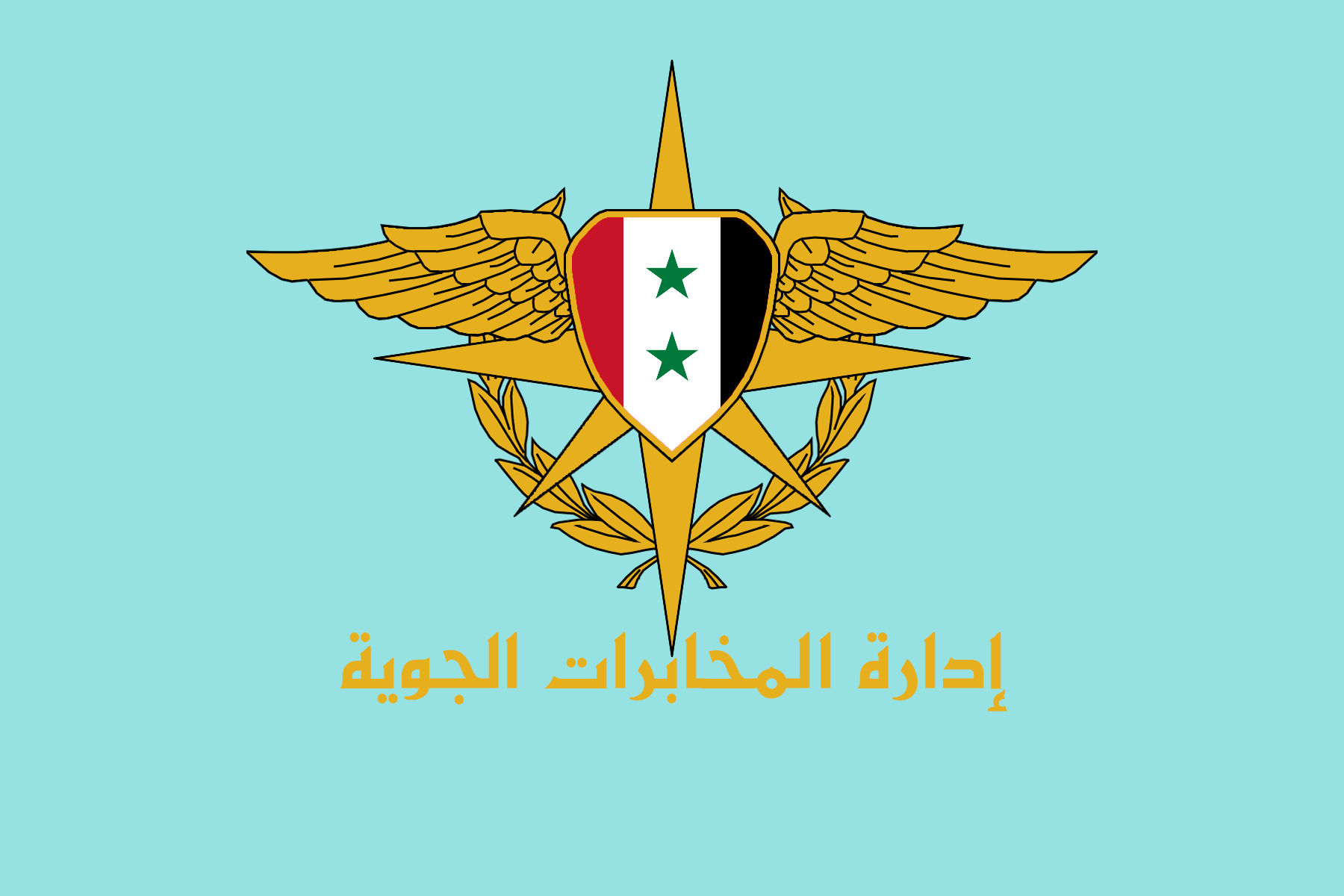
- Flag of the Air Force Intelligence Directorate

Agency overview
- Formed: 1970; 56 years ago
- Preceding agency: Second Bureau
- Dissolved: 8 December 2024 (de facto); 29 January 2025 (de jure)
- Jurisdiction: Government of Syria
- Headquarters: Defense Ministry headquarters, Umayyad Square, Damascus, Syria
- Agency executives: Qahtan Khalil (2024), Director; Malik Ali Habib (2023–2024), Deputy Director
- Parent agency: Ministry of Defense

The Air Force Intelligence Directorate (Arabic: إدارة المخابرات الجوية, romanized: Idarat al-Mukhabarat al-Jawiyya) was an air force intelligence service of Ba'athist Syria from 1970 until 2024, owing its importance to Hafez al-Assad's role as the Syrian Air Force commander. Despite its name, it was mainly involved with issues other than air force intelligence, and took an active part in the suppression of the Muslim Brotherhood rebellion in the 1980s. Agents of this service had frequently been stationed in Syrian embassies or branch offices of the national airline.

== History ==
The service was headed for seventeen years by Maj. Gen. Muhammad al-Khuli, who was trusted by Hafez al-Assad and had an office adjacent to the president's in the presidential palace. Between 1987 and 2002, it was headed by Ibrahim Huwayji. The service also took part in the efforts to put down the 2011 Syrian uprising against Bashar al-Assad's government. It is known to have been active in the town of Talkalakh near the Lebanese border. From 2009 until July 2019, the agency was headed by Major General Jamil Hassan, who is from Alawite sect.

From 2019 to 2024, it was headed by Major General Ghassan Ismail. Ismail previously served as a security official in the eastern Deir ez-Zor Governorate. He was a part of Bashar al-Assad's inner circle.

== Role ==
Military experts considered SAFI "the most powerful and notorious intelligence and security service in Syria", while the European Center for Constitutional and Human Rights called it the "most powerful and most brutal" of Syria's state security agencies. SAFI had a broad mandate as Assad's "personal machinery of repression and extermination," serving as the president's personal action service and having a broad role in external clandestine and covert operations.

Through its extensive network of prisons, SAFI imprisoned, tortured, and killed hundreds of thousands of Syrians.

== International investigations ==
After the fall of the Assad regime, the U.S. Department of Justice charged former SAFI officers Jamil Hassan and Abdul Salam Mahmoud with "conspiracy to commit war crimes through the infliction of cruel and inhuman treatment on detainees under their control."

== Directors ==
- Muhammad al-Khuli (1970–1987)
- Ibrahim Huweija (1987–2002)
- Iz a-Din Isma'il (2002–2005)
  - Deputy Director: Ali Mamlouk (2003 – June 2005)
- Abdul Fattah Qudsiyeh (2005 – 1 July 2009)
- Jamil Hassan (1 July 2009 – 7 July 2019) was sanctioned by the European Union for being "involved in violence against the civilian population."
  - Deputy Director: Ghassan Ismail (2012–2019)
  - Deputy Director: Fu'ad Tawil (2012) was sanctioned by European Union for "the use of violence across Syria and intimidation and torture of protestors."
  - Head of Investigative Branch: Maj. Gen. Abdulsalam Fajer Mahmoud (2011), accused of ordering or committing crimes against humanity by Human Rights Watch.
  - Head of Special Operations Branch: Maj. Gen. Ghassan Jaoudat Ismail (2011).
  - Head of Operations Branch: Col. Suheil Hassan (2011).
- Ghassan Ismail (8 July 2019 – 4 January 2024)
  - Deputy Director: Malik Ali Habib (July 2023 – 8 December 2024)
  - Head of Special Operations Branch: Brig. Gen. Mohammed Nafie Bilal (May 2024 – 2024)
- Qahtan Khalil (4 January – 8 December 2024)

=== Regional Directors ===
- Damascus branch: Brig. Gen. Ahmed Shaaban Muhammad (2024–2024)
  - Eyad Mandou (2012)
- Aleppo branch: Maj. Gen. Adib Salameh (2012–2016)
- Hama branch: Col. Duraid Awad (2024–2024)
- Homs branch: Brig. Gen. Radwan Saqqar (2024–2024)
  - Brig. Gen. Jawdat al-Ahmed (2012) accused of "ordering or committing crimes against humanity".
- Latakia branch: Brig. Gen. Rami Munir Ismail (2024–2024)
  - Col. Suhail Al-Abdullah (2012) accused of "ordering or committing crimes against humanity".
- Tartus branch: Brig. Gen. Rami Munir Ismail (2024–2024)
- Qamishli branch: Brig. Gen. Fouad Suleiman (2024–2024)
- Daraa branch: Col. Qusay Mihoub (2012) accused of "ordering or committing crimes against humanity".

== Paramilitary units ==
- Guardians of the Dawn (disbanded in 2017)
  - Lions of the Cherubim
    - Earthquake of Jobar
  - Ararat Group
  - Lions of the Valley
  - Intervention Regiment
  - Lions of Dwel’a
- Khaybar Brigade (disbanded in 2017)
- Fawj Nusur (Leopards) of Homs (disbanded in 2018)
- Kata'ib al-Jabalawi of Homs (disbanded in 2018)

== Other Syrian intelligence agencies ==
- National Security Bureau
- General Intelligence Directorate
- Political Security Directorate
- Military Intelligence Directorate
