= Liwa =

Liwa may refer to:

== Groups ==
- Liwa Zainabiyoun, a Shia Pakistani militia
- Liwa Fatemiyoun, a Shia Afghan militia
- Liwa Zulfiqar, a Shia Syrian militia
- Liwa Abu al-Fadhal al-Abbas, Shia Syrian militia
- Liwa Assad Allah al-Ghalib fi al-Iraq wa al-Sham, a Shia militia in Iraq
- Liwa al-Quds, former Palestinian brigade of the Syrian army

== Place ==
Chad

- Liwa (sub-prefecture) in Mamdi Department

Indonesia

- Liwa, Indonesia

Oman

- Liwa, Oman, a Wilayah (province) in Oman

Poland

- Liwa, Warmian-Masurian Voivodeship, a village in northern Poland
- Liwa (river), a river in Poland

United Arab Emirates

- Liwa Oasis, Abu Dhabi

== People ==
- Zofia Gomułkowa, born Liwa Szoken
- Tom Liwa

== Other uses ==
- Liwa (Arabic), meaning district, banner, or a military rank
- Liwa (music), traditional dance in the United Arab Emirates, Bahrain and Eastern Saudi Arabia.
- Liwa Chemicals, chemicals company in UAE
- Al Liwaa, daily newspaper in Lebanon
- Al Liwaa (newspaper), daily newspaper in Mandatory Palestine
- Sanjak, an administrative division of the Ottoman Empire also called a Liwa
