= List of armed factions during the Syrian civil war =

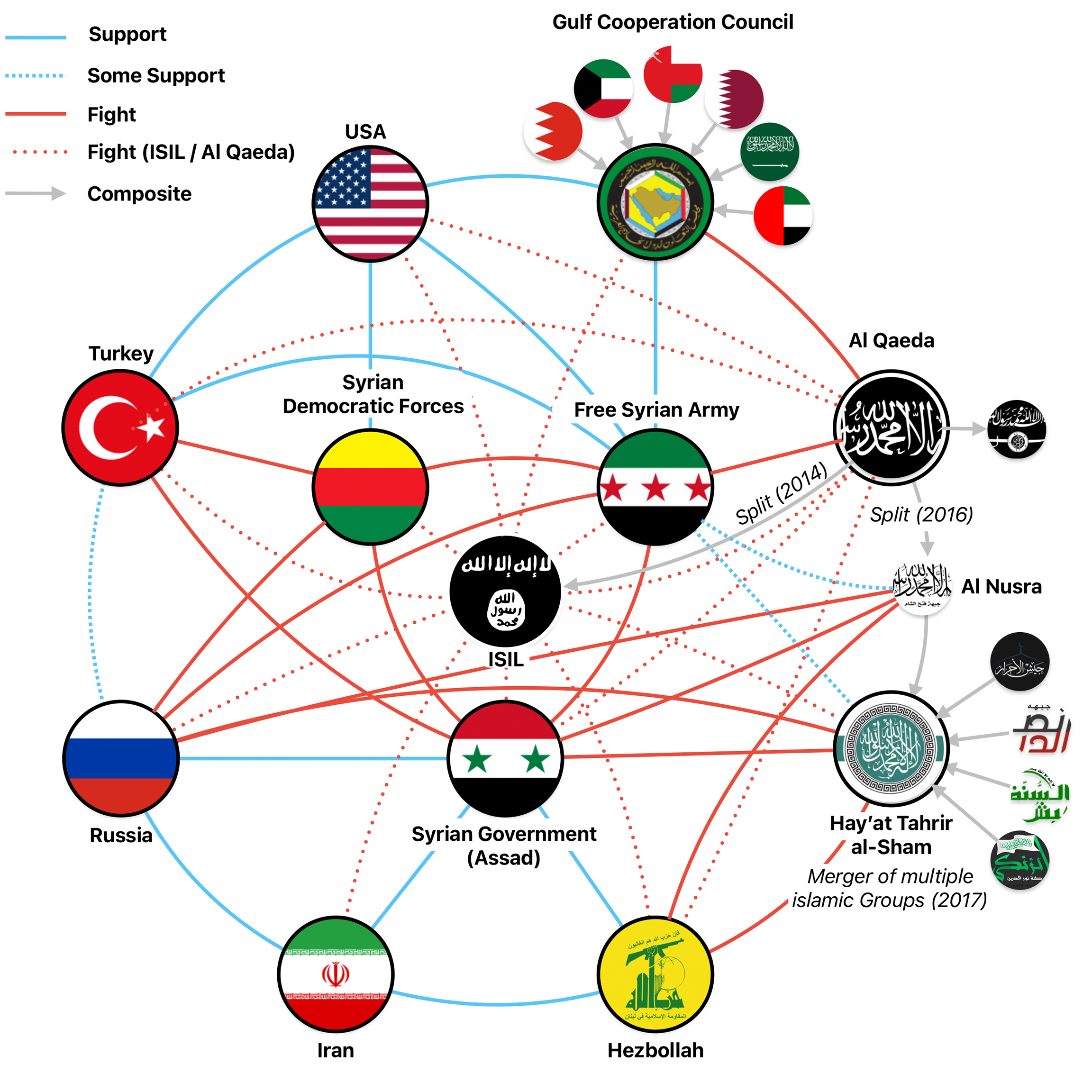
Local, regional and international actors involved in the Syrian civil war prior to the fall of Damascus and the Assad regime

The Syrian civil war (2011–2024) involved a number of states and armed groups. The main belligerents were Ba'athist Syria and allies, the Syrian opposition and allies, Al-Qaeda and affiliates, the Islamic State, and the Kurdish-led Syrian Democratic Forces.

== Syrian government (Ba'athist regime) and allies ==
A number of sources have emphasized that as of at least late-2015/early-2016 the Assad regime was dependent on a mix of volunteers and militias, rather than the regular Syrian Armed Forces. Between 2016 and 2020, with the help of Russia and Iran, the Syrian Arab Armed Forces were rebuilt and had united most of the armed militias.

=== Syrian Armed Forces ===
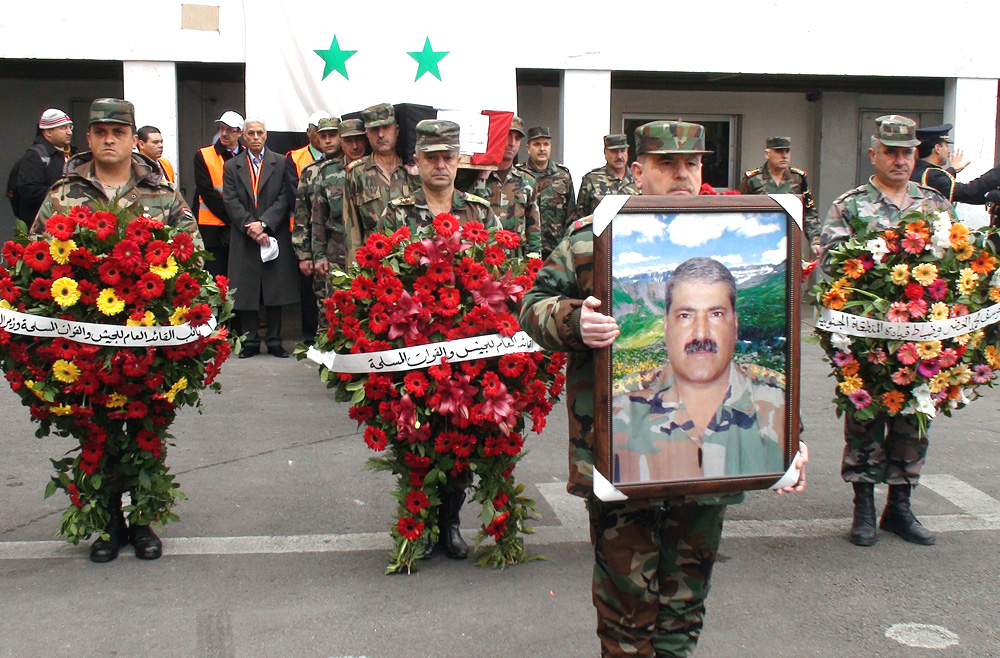
The funeral procession of Syrian General Mohammed al-Awwad who was assassinated in Damascus in 2012

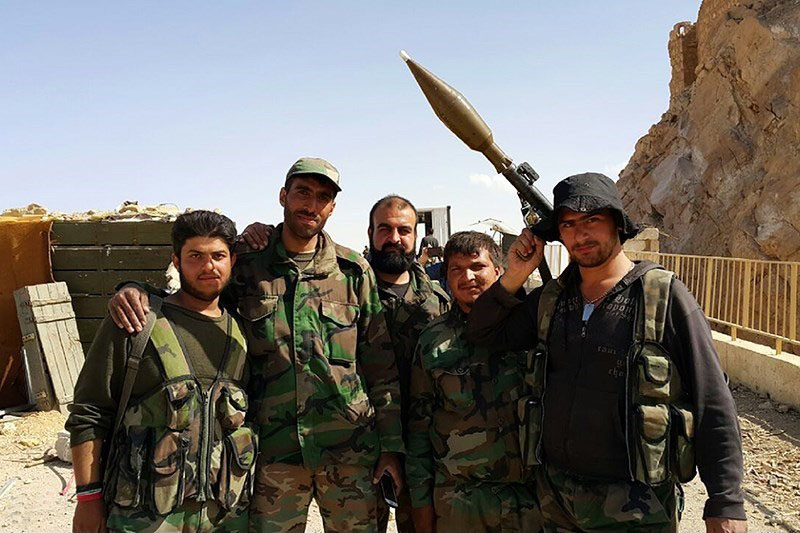
Syrian Army soldiers after the 2016 Palmyra offensive.

The Syrian Armed Forces were made up of the Syrian Arab Army (including Republican Guard), Syrian Arab Navy, Syrian Arab Air Force, the Syrian Air Defense Force and the paramilitary National Defence Forces. Before the uprising and war broke out, the Syrian Armed Forces were estimated at 295,000 regular troops and 314,000 reservists. While the higher positions in the army were mostly occupied by Alawites, the ground troops were mostly made up of Sunnis, and once the uprisings began, the Syrian regime hesitated to employ these troops against the Sunni rebels. Therefore, the army relied on loyal elite units and Alawite militias such as the Shabiha. Due to defections following the uprisings, by the end of 2013 the number of regular troops had decreased to around 110,000. As of 2024, the Syrian Army was estimated at 169,000 active troops. Most of the divisions in the army were under-strength, but Russia had been assisting in the reconstruction and re-equipment of some divisions until the fall of the Assad regime in late 2024, whereupon the Syrian Arab Armed Forces surrendered and were de facto dissolved by the Syrian Opposition groups.

In the aftermath, former government-held regions came under the control of different opposition factions. Some former SAA personnel were absorbed into new defense forces. Efforts to form a centralized transitional military command were ongoing as of early 2025.

=== National Defense Forces ===
The Syrian NDF (Arabic: قوات الدفاع الوطني Quwāt ad-Difāʿ al-Watanī) was formed out of pro-government militias in November 2012. The forces acted in an infantry role, directly fighting against rebels on the ground and running counter-insurgency operations in coordination with the army, who provided them with logistical and artillery support. Many of the fighters were trained in Iran, and they received their salaries and military equipment from the Syrian government. As of 2024, the NDF numbered around 50,000 troops. The forces had a 500-strong women's wing called "Lionesses of National Defense" which operated checkpoints. The NDF were mostly made up of Alawites, but many of the Syrian Christian militias (such as Sootoro in Al-Hasakah) also fought on the Syrian government's side to defend their ancient towns, villages and farmsteads from ISIL (see also Christian Militias in Syria).

=== Shabiha ===
The Shabiha (Levantine Arabic: شَبِّيحَة Šabbīḥa, pronounced [ʃabˈbiːħa]; also romanized Shabeeha or Shabbiha; lit. 'ghosts') are unofficial pro-government militias drawn largely from Syria's Alawite minority group. Since the uprising, the Baathist Syrian government has been accused of using Shabiha to break up protests and enforce laws in resistive neighborhoods. As the protests escalated into an armed conflict, the opposition started using the term Shabiha to describe civilians they suspected of supporting Bashar al-Assad and the Syrian government and clashing with pro-opposition demonstrators. The opposition blames the Shabiha for the many violent excesses committed against anti-government protesters and opposition sympathizers, as well as for looting and destruction.

The Shabiha phenomenon started in the 1980s, not as one specific group but as a number of criminal and semi-criminal groups affiliated with the Assad clan. Bassel al-Assad attempted to curtail their activities in the 1990s but did not fully succeed. The Shabiha have been described as "a notorious Alawite paramilitary, who are accused of acting as unofficial enforcers for Assad's government"; "gunmen loyal to Assad", and, according to the Qatar-based Arab Center for Research and Policy Studies, "semi-criminal gangs comprised of thugs close to the government". Despite the group's image as an Alawite militia, some Shabiha operating in Aleppo have been reported to be Sunnis.

By the late 2010s, many Shabiha groups were integrated into formal pro-government militias such as the National Defence Forces (NDF). Despite this integration, independent Shabiha networks continued to operate in some regions into the early 2020s, often engaging in smuggling, extortion, and looting. Human rights organizations have continued to document allegations of abuses by former Shabiha elements now active within other paramilitary structures.

=== Hezbollah ===
Hezbollah is an Iran-backed Shia armed group and political force based in Lebanon. On 25 May 2013, its leader Hassan Nasrallah confirmed that Hezbollah troops were fighting with the Syrian army against Islamic extremists and pledged that "his group will not allow Syrian militants to control areas that border Lebanon". In the televised address, he said, "If Syria falls in the hands of America, Israel and the takfiris, the people of our region will go into a dark period." He also called on Shiites and Hezbollah to protect the shrine of Sayida Zeinab. President Bashar al-Assad had denied earlier that May that there were foreign fighters, Arab or otherwise, fighting for the government in Syria.

Hezbollah's decision to aid the Syrian government is most likely due to the fact that they enjoy the protection of the government when it comes to the group's arms procurement and storage in Syria. Syria forms an important access corridor between Hezbollah in Lebanon and their supporter, Iran, and the survival of a regime that was friendly to Hezbollah was in the group's best interest.

In 2012 and 2013, Hezbollah was active in gaining control of territory in the Homs Governorate in Syria. By May 2013 the group was publicly collaborating with the Syrian Army and helping them to gain control of 60 percent of Al-Qusayr by 14 May. In Lebanon, an increase in the funerals of Hezbollah fighters was reported, as well as the shelling of Hezbollah-controlled areas by Syrian rebels.

According to independent analysts, by the beginning of 2014, approximately 500 Hezbollah fighters had died in the Syrian conflict. In 2014, Nasrallah claimed the Hezbollah fighters had helped Assad take back control over the country, and that the Syrian regime was no longer in danger of being toppled. The current number of Hezbollah troops in Syria is estimated to be around 7000-8000.

After 2014, Hezbollah's involvement in Syria continued to grow, with the group playing a significant role in major military offensives, such as the Battle of Aleppo (2016) and the Syrian government's recapture of eastern Ghouta (2018). The group also became increasingly involved in securing areas near the Syrian-Lebanese border. By 2020, Hezbollah's forces were reported to be involved in the defense of strategic military positions and continued to provide military assistance to Syrian forces, despite growing opposition from Syrian rebel groups.

The Return Forces (Arabic: قوات العودة, romanized: Quwat al-Aouda) was a Palestinian group founded by Hezbollah in July 2015 and led by Abu Dhikra. It called for the Palestinian return and fought against Syrian opposition. The group fought in Yarmouk and Abu Kamal.

=== Iran ===
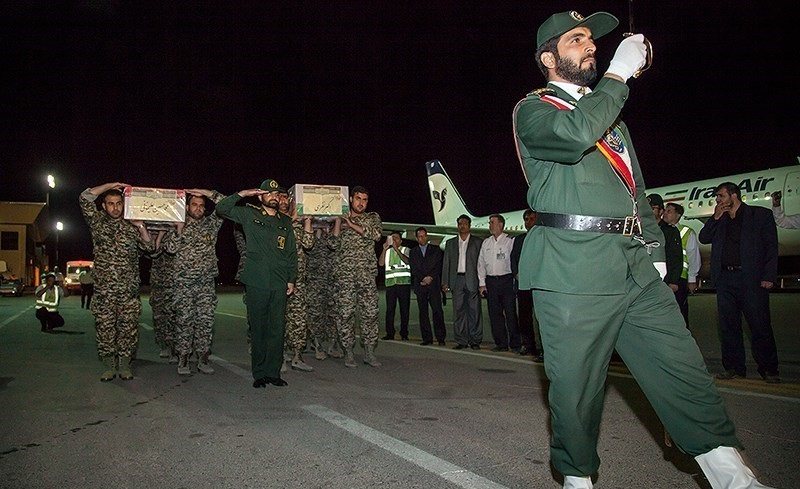
Bodies of Iranian casualties return to Kermanshah, August 2016.

Since the civil uprising phase of the Syrian civil war, Iran has provided the Syrian Arab Republic with financial, technical, and military support, including the training and sending of combat troops. Iran and Syria are close strategic allies, as Iran sees the survival of the Assad government as being crucial to its regional interests. Iran's supreme leader, Ali Khamenei, was reported to be vocally in favor of the Baathist government.

By December 2013, Iran was thought to have approximately 10,000 operatives in Syria. But according to Jubin Goodarzi, assistant professor and researcher at Webster University, Iran aided Baathist Syria with a limited number of deployed units and personnel, "at most in the hundreds ... and not in the thousands as opposition sources claimed". Lebanese Hezbollah fighters backed by Tehran have taken direct combat roles since 2012. In the summer of 2013, Iran and Hezbollah provided important battlefield support for Syrian forces, allowing them to make advances on the opposition. In 2014, coinciding with the peace talks at Geneva II, Iran has stepped up support for Syrian President Assad. The Syrian Minister of Finance and Economy stated more than 15 billion dollars had come from the Iranian government. Prior to his assassination, Islamic Revolutionary Guard Corps's Quds Force commander Qasem Soleimani was in charge of Syrian President Assad's security portfolio and oversaw the arming and training of thousands of pro-government Shi'ite fighters.

By 2015, 328 IRGC troops, including several commanders, had reportedly been killed in the Syrian civil war since it began. As of 2024, the estimated number of Iranian troops in Syria is 1500.

=== Foreign Shia militias ===
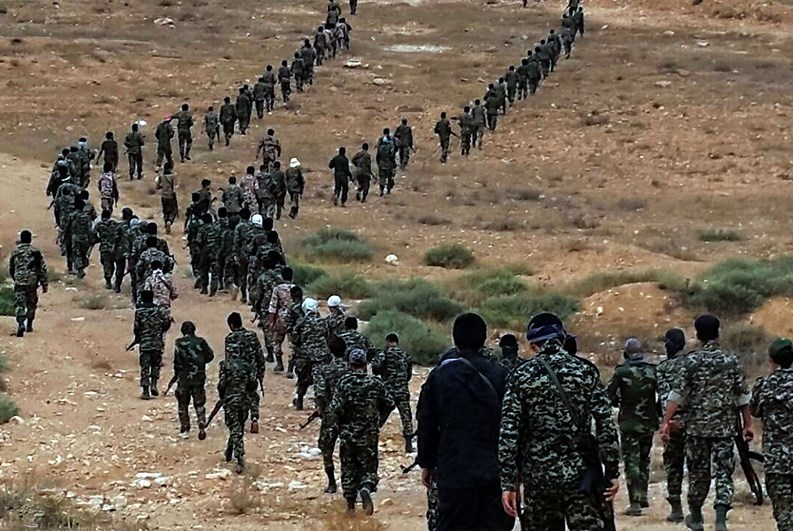
Liwa Fatemiyoun fighters during the Palmyra offensive in December 2016

Besides training and sending troops, Iran has also recruited Shia fighters from Iraq, Afghanistan and Pakistan to fight on behalf of the Syrian Arab Republic. The number of Afghans fighting in Syria has been estimated at "between 10,000 and 18,000" at its height, but is currently estimated between 500 and 1500. The main force composed of Afghan fighters is the liwa' fatimiyun (Fatemiyoun Brigade), which was found in late 2012. The number of Pakistani fighters is much lower, between 800 and 2500, and concentrated in the liwa' zaynabiyun (Zaynabiyun Brigade) formed in November 2015. Many or most of the fighters were refugees living in Iran, and survivors and defectors of the Fatemiyoun reported being coerced or bribed into joining the militia, and being sent to the most dangerous front lines with little to no training.

After 2015, the number of foreign Shia fighters in Syria continued to fluctuate. Liwa Fatemiyoun, composed mostly of Afghan fighters, remained one of the largest foreign Shia militias in Syria, playing key roles in offensives such as the recapture of Aleppo and the battle for Deir ez-Zor. Liwa Zaynabiyun, primarily consisting of Pakistani fighters, also participated in key battles, with estimates of their numbers ranging between 800 and 2500 fighters as of 2020. Reports indicate that some fighters, particularly from the Fatemiyoun Brigade, continued to be recruited under coercion or financial incentives, facing high casualty rates in combat.

=== Russia ===
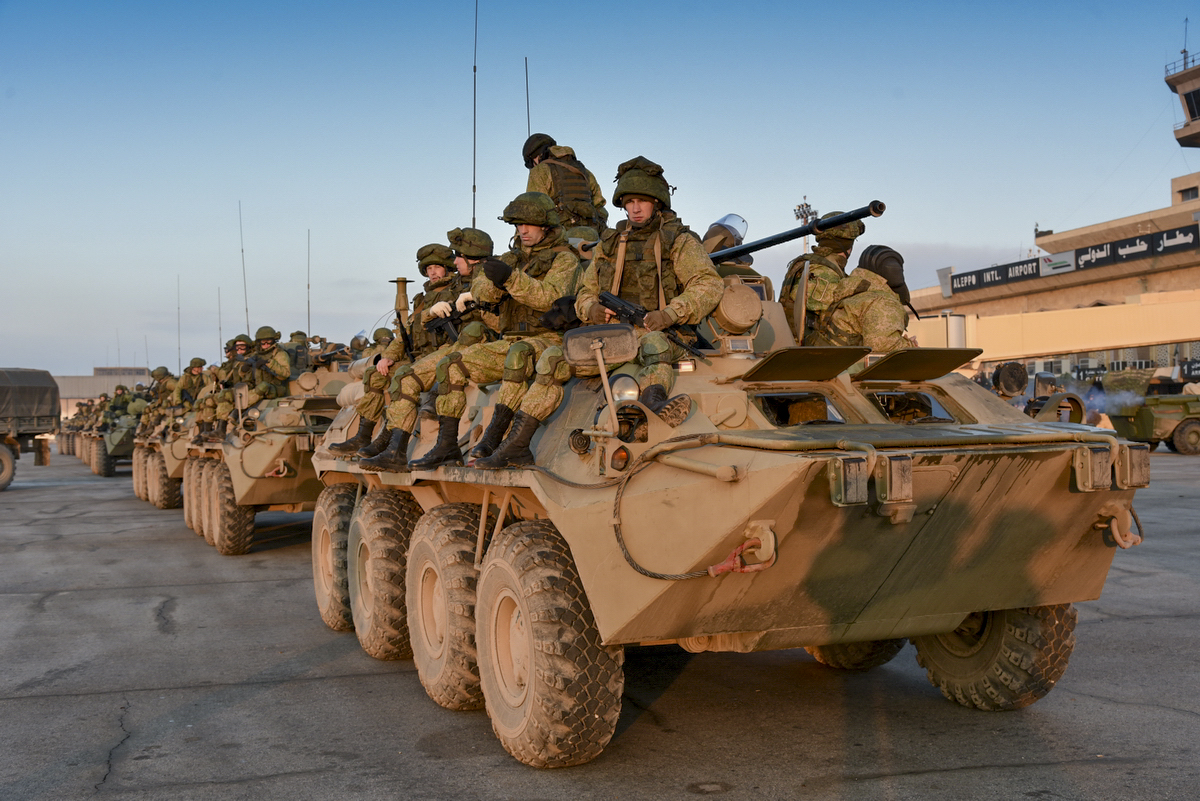
Russian troops in Aleppo in December 2016

On 30 September 2015, Russia launched a military intervention in Syria (at the request of Bashar Al-Assad) to support the government of Bashar al-Assad in its fight against the rebels and Islamic State (IS). The Russian forces proved to be a deciding factor in the war, helping the Assad regime to stay in power. The Syrian war became an important testing ground and boost for Russian army and Russian-based military group, such as the Wagner Group. In 2022, Russia withdrew most of their troops from Syria, to reinforce their army at the front in Ukraine. As of 2024, the estimated number of Russian troops in Syria is 4000. The Russian government and the Syrian government have long been allies, and the fall of the regime would have meant the loss of an important Russian ally in the region.

In March 2023, Assad stated that he would welcome more Russian troops and military bases in Syria.

=== Post-Assad ===
Following the collapse of the Assad regime in December 2024, pro-Assad armed groups formed and have participated in an insurgency against the Syrian transitional government.

- Syrian Popular Resistance – Formed in December 2024 and allegedly relies on direct support from the Iranian Revolutionary Guard
- (Ba'athist Syria) Coastal Shield Brigade – Formed in February 2025, it is led by Miqdad Fatiha and operates in the Latakia Governorate
- Islamic Resistance Front in Syria – Formed in December 2024 in opposition to both the transitional government and the Israel Defense Forces during their ongoing invasion
- (Ba'athist Syria) Military Council for the Liberation of Syria – Formed in March 2025 and led by former SAA Brigadier General Ghiath Dalla

== Syrian opposition and allies ==
=== Syrian National Coalition and Syrian Interim Government ===
==== Syrian National Council ====
Formed on 23 August 2011, the National Council is a coalition of anti-government groups, based in Turkey. The group includes signatories of the 2005 Damascus Declaration, the Syrian Muslim Brotherhood, Kurdish and Assyrian factions, representatives of Alawi communities and Local Coordination Committees. The National Council seeks the end of Bashar al-Assad's rule and the establishment of a modern, civil, democratic state. SNC has links with the Free Syrian Army. The Kurdish parties eventually left the Council, after it resisted their demands for political decentralisation.

==== Syrian National Coalition ====
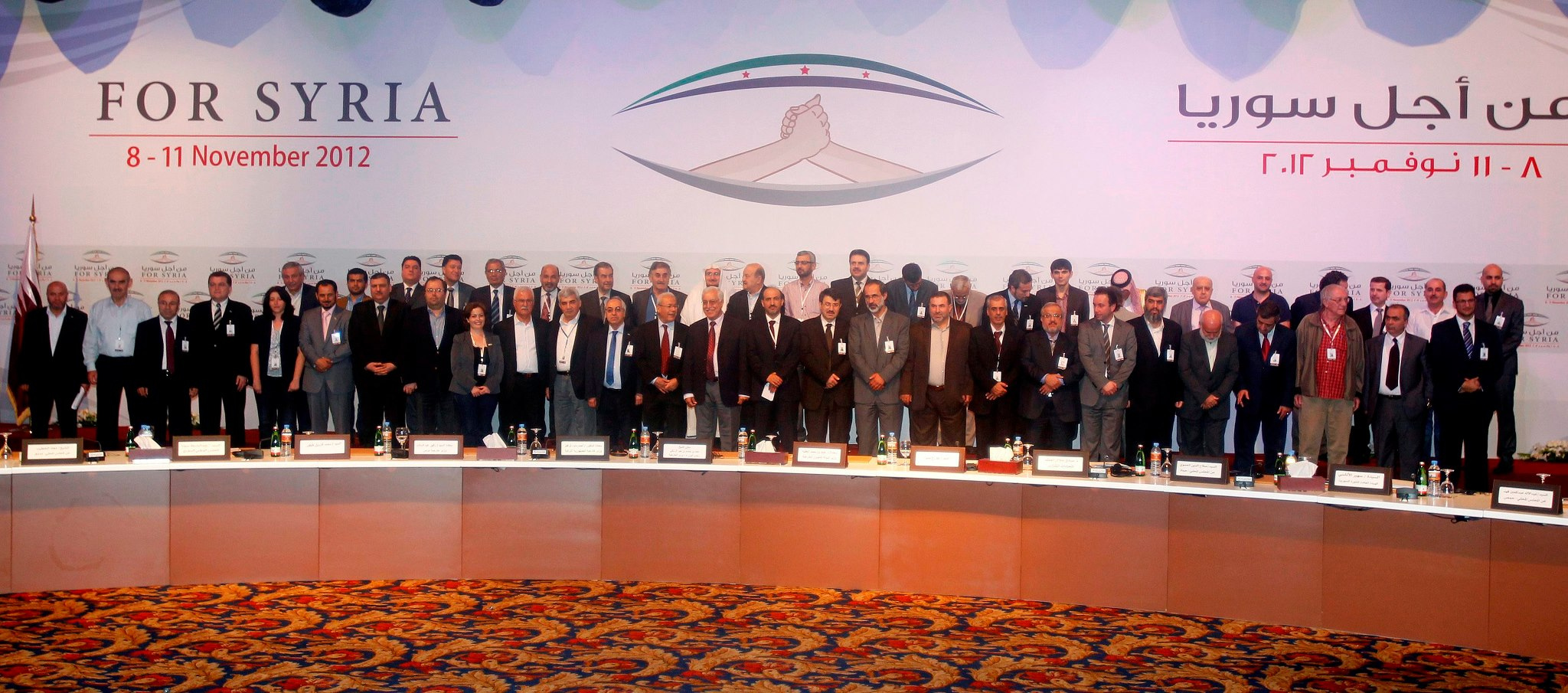
Syrian National Coalition members in Doha, 11 November 2012. In center, president al-Khatib, along with VPs Seif and Atassi, as well as all SNC chairmen Ghalioun, Sieda and Sabra.

On 11 November 2012 in Doha, the National Council and other opposition groups united as the National Coalition of Syrian Revolutionary and Opposition Forces. The Syrian National Council has 22 out of 60 seats of the Syrian National Coalition. The following day, it was recognised as the legitimate government of Syria by numerous Arab Gulf states, and later by the US, France, Turkey, Spain and the UK as well.

Delegates to the Coalition's leadership council are to include women and representatives of religious and ethnic minorities, including Alawites. The military council will reportedly include the Free Syrian Army. The main aims of the National Coalition are replacing the Bashar al-Assad government and "its symbols and pillars of support", "dismantling the security services", unifying and supporting the Free Syrian Army, refusing dialogue and negotiation with the al-Assad government, and "holding accountable those responsible for killing Syrians, destroying [Syria], and displacing [Syrians]."

The SNC was criticised for their weak political and organisational dynamics, caused by internal power conflicts. The SNC's main function was to coordinate the humanitarian assistance, instead of forming a real political leadership.

==== Syrian Interim Government ====
In 2013, after pressure from France, Turkey and Qatar, the Syrian National Coalition formed the Syrian Interim Government (SIG), in order to rule the territories which had been liberated from the regime. The SIG was created to give the opposition movement more legitimacy 'on the ground', by offering humanitarian assistance and governance. The minister of defence was to be chosen by the Free Syrian Army. The interim government's headquarters in Syria are located in the city of Azaz in Aleppo Governorate. As of June 2019 its prime minister is Abdurrahman Mustafa and as of July 2021 its president is Salem al-Meslet.

On 30 January 2025, the SIG officially "placed itself at the disposal" of the first Syrian transitional government, which began deploying its forces across former SIG territory in early February 2025.

=== Free Syrian Army and affiliated groups ===
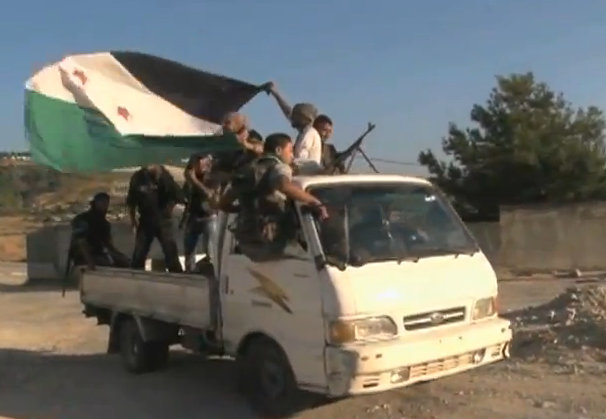
Free Syrian Army fighters being transported by pickup truck

Flag of the Free Syrian Army

The formation of the Free Syrian Army (FSA) was announced on 29 July 2011 by a group of defecting Syrian Army officers, encouraging others to defect to defend civilian protesters from violence by the state and effect government change. By December 2011, estimates of the number of defectors to the FSA ranged from 1,000 to over 25,000. The group received weaponry, provisions and money from regional states such as Saudi Arabia, Qatar and Turkey, and from the US. The FSA, initially "headquartered" in Turkey, moved its headquarters to northern Syria in September 2012, and currently functions more as an umbrella organisation than a traditional military chain of command.

The group started out with guerilla-style raids and ambushes, but as they gathered more members more complex assault tactics were used.

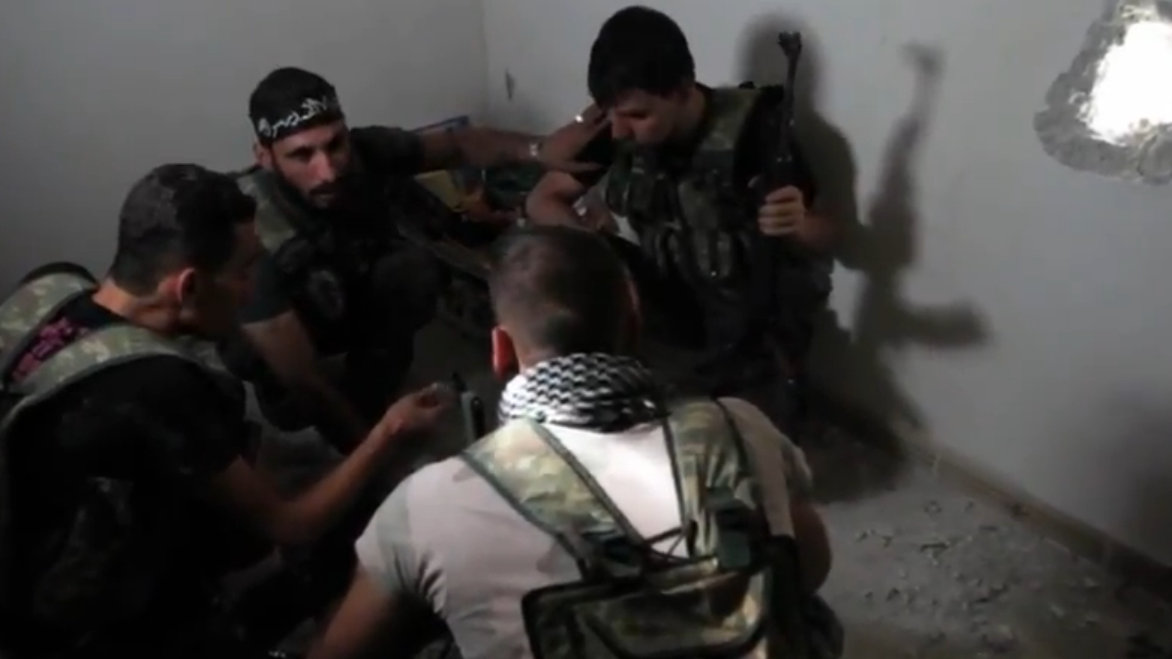
FSA soldiers plan during the Battle of Aleppo (October 2012).

The designation of the FSA by the West as a moderate opposition faction has allowed it, under the CIA-run programmes, to receive sophisticated weaponry and other military support from the U.S., Turkey and some Gulf countries. However, the aid which was coming in from other countries did not flow through a centralised command but in a fragmented way, based on personal contacts, which led to internal rivalries within the FSA.

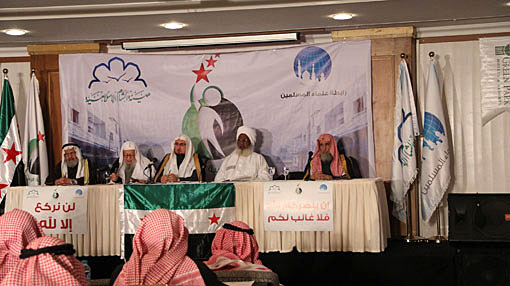
Syrian opposition campaign in support of Syria in 2012

Abu Yusaf, a commander of the Islamic State (IS), claimed in August 2014 that many of the FSA members who had been trained by United States' and Turkish and Arab military officers ended up joining IS. However, by September 2014 the Free Syrian Army was joining an alliance and common front with Kurdish militias including the YPG to fight IS.

In December 2015, according to the American Institute for the Study of War, groups identifying as FSA were still present around Aleppo and Hama and in southern Syria, and the FSA was still "the biggest and most secular of the rebel groups." However, the group continued to suffer losses from fighters who joined the Syrian Democratic Forces or IS.

After the Turkish military intervention in Syria in 2016, and as other countries began to scale back their involvement, the FSA became more dependent on Turkish help. For the FSA, Turkey was a sanctuary and a source of supplies. From late August 2016, the Turkish government assembled a new coalition of Syrian rebel groups, including many that were in the FSA. Often referred to as the Turkish-backed Free Syrian Army (TFSA), this force would adopt the name Syrian National Army in 2017.

By March 2017, the FSA together with Kurdish militias finished clearing the Islamic State from the north of Syria.

The FSA currently works in the 55 km area, alongside the border with Iraq and Jordan to prevent drug trafficking and IS activity in the region.

In December 2024, after the fall of the Assad regime, the founding leader of FSA, Riad al-Asaad, returned to Syrian capital Damascus. He said that the FSA had been working closely with Islamist group Hayat Tahrir al-Sham (HTS), which led the overthrown of the Assad regime.

=== Syrian National Army ===
On 30 December 2017, at least 30 factions operating under the banner of the Syrian Interim Government merged in a unified armed group after four months of preparations. Jawad Abu Hatab, the Prime Minister and the Defense Minister, announced the forming of the Syrian National Army after meeting with rebel commanders in the town of Azaz. The newly formed body claimed to have 22,000 fighters, many of them trained and equipped by Turkey. Though concentrated in Turkish-occupied areas, originally as a part of Operation Euphrates Shield, the SNA also established a presence in the Idlib Governorate during the 2019 northwestern Syria offensive, and consolidated its presence when the National Front for Liberation joined the SNA on 4 October 2019.

The official aims of the group are to assist the Republic of Turkey in creating a "safe zone" in Syria, and to establish a National Army. They are strong opponents of the Syrian Democratic Forces (SDF), and have also fought the Islamic State (ISIL) and, to a lesser extent, the Baathist Syrian government's Syrian Arab Army. The SNA has a law enforcement equivalent, the Free Police, which is also backed by Turkey. The SNA currently controls the Afrin area, and nearby areas of Syria bordering Turkey, including the town of Jarabalus. They are currently estimated to have around 70,000 fighters, and have been involved in clashes with the group Hayat Tahrir al-Sham since 2022.

=== National Coordination Committee for Democratic Change ===
Formed in 2011 and based in Damascus, the National Coordination Committee for Democratic Change is an opposition bloc consisting of 13 left-wing and Arab nationalist political parties and "independent political and youth activists". It has been defined by Reuters as the internal opposition's main umbrella group. In 2011, the group organised its first conference, opposing militarisation, internationalisation and sectarianisation of the uprising. Initially, the NCC had several Kurdish political parties as members, but all except for the Democratic Union Party left in October 2011 to join the Kurdish National Council.

Relations with other Syrian political opposition groups are generally poor. In 2011, the on-the-ground protest movement rejected the NCC in favour of the Syrian National Council (SNC). The Syrian Revolution General Commission, the Local Coordination Committees of Syria and the Supreme Council of the Syrian Revolution oppose the NCC' calls to dialogue with the Baathist government. Some of the organisations have accused the NCC of being a "front organisation" for Bashar al-Assad's government and some of its members of being ex-government insiders. In September 2012, the SNC reaffirmed that despite broadening its membership, it would not join with "currents close to [the] NCC". Despite the NCC recognising the Free Syrian Army on 23 September 2012, the FSA has dismissed the NCC as an extension of the government, stating that "this opposition is just the other face of the same coin".

In June 2023, the NCC came to an agreement with the Syrian Democratic Council and the two groups published a "consensus document" in which they stated their shared goals and visions for the future of Syria. These goals include the drafting of a new constitution, the rejection of separatist and divisive groups and the establishment of one united national democratic front.

=== Hayat Tahrir al-Sham ===
In January 2017, Hayat Tahrir al-Sham (HTS) was formed when al-Nusra Front joined with other Salafi factions Ansar al-Din Front, Jaysh al-Sunna, the Nour al-Din al-Zenki Movement and Liwa al-Haqq. (The Ansar al-Din Front and the Nour al-Din al-Zenki Movement have since split off). The newly-formed HTS went on to gain more followers from defectors from Ahrar al-Sham. HTS fighters went after IS militants who fled to Idlib after their defeat and cracked down on Hurras al-Din, another militant group with ties to al-Qaeda.

Flag of the Syrian Salvation Government

In November 2017, HTS created the Syrian Salvation government (HTS), an alternative government of the Syrian Opposition which governs parts of the Idlib Governorate. It is seen as illegitimate by the opposition's main SIG. Initially, the Salvation government harshly enforced a strict interpretation of Islamic law, but in recent years the group has become more tolerant. The religious police has been disbanded and the HTS leader is advocating against the US designation of the group as a terrorist organisation, calling it "unfair". Contrary to al-Qaeda, HTS does not strive to create a global caliphate but is more locally oriented, with its primary objective being the establishment of Islamic rule in Syria through “toppling the criminal [Assad] regime and expelling the Iranian militias." The group gains money through spoils captured from the regime and opposition factions, prisoner exchange deals, the plunder of historical sites and the selling of artifacts, the claiming of private property from Christians and government supporters, and through taxes.

The leader of HTS was Ahmed al-Sharaa, popularly known as "Abu Mohammad al-Jolani". The group had an estimated 10,000 members in 2024. HTS has denied being part of al-Qaeda and said in a statement that it is "an independent entity and not an extension of previous organisations or factions". The group has been involved in fierce clashes with the Syrian National Army in the north of Syria since 2022. In the beginning of 2024, protests broke out across Idlib province against HTS, their mismanagement of the local economy, and the detention and torture of political prisoners.

In November 2024, the HTS launched the Syrian opposition offensives, which it called Deterrence of Aggression reportedly capturing 11 towns and villages in western Aleppo Governorate, capturing the eponymous governorate's capital of Aleppo four days into the offensive. By 4 December, HTS had captured most of Aleppo Governorate and Idlib Governorate and began to advance on Hama. On 7–8 December, Damascus fell to Syrian opposition forces, including HTS, the Southern Operations Room, and the US-backed Syrian Free Army, and Assad fled to Russia. On 30 December, HTS leader and the de facto leader of Syria al-Sharaa announced that the organisation would be dissolved by 4–5 January 2025. After the fall of Damascus in December 2024, the SSG was replaced by the Syrian transitional government. On 29 January 2025, at the Syrian Revolution Victory Conference held in Damascus, Hassan Abdul Ghani, spokesperson for the Military Operations Command, announced the dissolution of HTS and declared that they would become part of "state institutions". On the same day, al-Sharaa was appointed President of Syria by the Syrian General Command for the transitional period.

== Al-Qaeda and affiliates ==
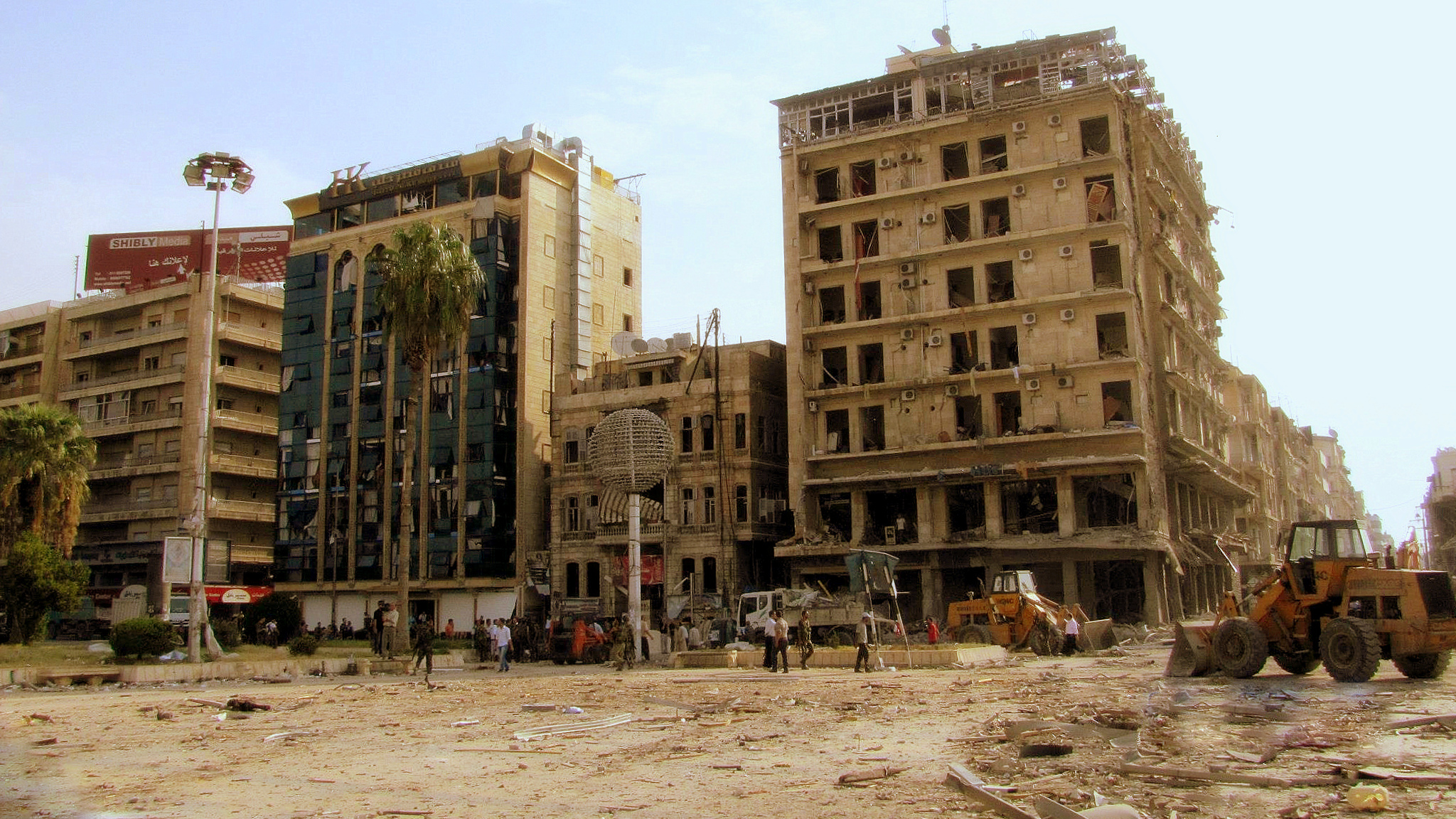
The scene of the October 2012 Aleppo bombings, for which al-Nusra Front claimed responsibility

Flag of Hurras al-Din

Al-Qaeda is a jihadist militant group that was established by Osama bin Laden. Several groups aligned with Al-Qaeda have become armed actors in the Syrian Civil War.

=== Al-Nusra Front / Jabhat Fateh al-Sham ===
Prior to the expansion of ISIL, al-Qaeda's Syrian affiliate, al-Nusra Front was often considered to be the most aggressive and violent part of the opposition. Being responsible for over 50 suicide bombings, including several deadly explosions in Damascus in 2011 and 2012, it was recognized as a terrorist organization by the Syrian Arab Republic and was designated as such by United States in December 2012. In April 2013, the leader of the Islamic State of Iraq released an audio statement announcing that al-Nusra Front is its branch in Syria. The then-leader of al-Nusra, Ahmed al-Sharaa, said that the group would not merge with the Islamic State of Iraq but would still maintain allegiance to Ayman al-Zawahiri, the leader of al-Qaeda. From 2012 to 2016, the estimated manpower of al-Nusra Front was approximately 6,000–10,000 people, including many foreign fighters.

The relationship between the al-Nusra Front and the indigenous Syrian opposition was tense, even though al-Nusra has fought alongside the FSA in several battles and some FSA fighters defected to the al-Nusra Front. The Mujahideen's strict religious views and willingness to impose sharia law disturbed many Syrians. Some rebel commanders have accused foreign jihadists of "stealing the revolution", robbing Syrian factories and displaying religious intolerance. Al-Nusra Front renamed itself Jabhat Fatah al-Sham (JFS) in June 2016. In 2017, the group merged with other groups into Hay'at Tahrir al-Sham.

=== Hurras al-Din ===
Tanzim Hurras al-Din is a Salafi Jihadist group that was formed as a merger between several al-Qaeda aligned factions in February 2018. The head of the group, Abu Humam al-Shami, is a Syrian who fought with al-Qaeda in Afghanistan during the 1990s and previously with the al-Nusra Front, but who left when the group broke official ties with al-Qaeda. Since 2020, Hurras al-Din has not been officially endorsed by al-Qaeda. The group is currently estimated to have around 2500 fighters, an estimated half of whom are foreign fighters, a much higher percentage than in HTS.

== Islamic State ==
Flag of ISIS

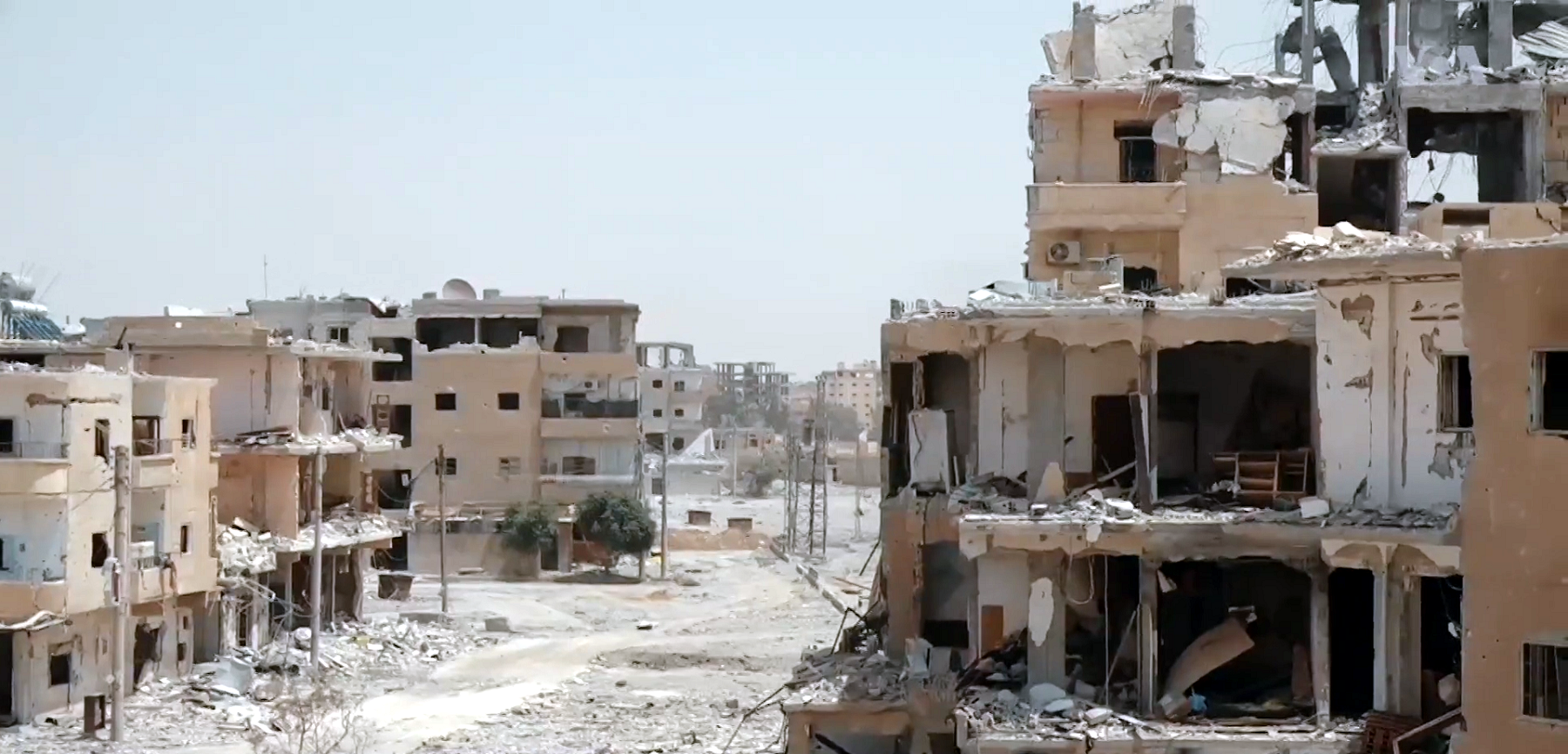
Much of Raqqa suffered extensive damage during the battle of Raqqa in June–October 2017.

The group called Dā'ash or the Islamic State (abbrv. IS, ISIL or ISIS), began to make rapid military gains in Northern Syria starting in April 2013 and as of mid-2014 controlled large parts of that region, where the Syrian Observatory for Human Rights described it as "the strongest group". The group strives to establish a global caliphate, by waging war on the "disbelievers". It has imposed strict Sharia law over land that it controls. The group was found by the Iraqi fighter Abu Bakr al-Baghdadi, and had an estimated 7,000 fighters in Syria, including many non-Syrians, by the end of 2013. IS was originally affiliated with al-Qaeda, until al-Qaeda officially severed ties with the group in early 2014.

The group gathered international attention for its gruesome abuses of human rights and for not tolerating non-Islamist militia groups, foreign journalists or aid workers, whose members it has expelled, imprisoned, or executed. Just across the border from Syria in Iraq, IS has carried out a genocide of the Yazidi people, killing hundreds of men, enslaving thousands of women and children and expelling the Yazidis from their homeland.

By summer 2014, ISIL controlled a third of Syria. It established itself as the dominant force of Syrian opposition, defeating Jabhat al-Nusra in Deir Ezzor Governorate and claiming control over most of Syria's oil and gas production. Mostly, the group was engaging in offensives against the Syrian Armed Forces and the Free Syrian Army, but they also targeted the Syrian Democratic Forces. ISIL have planted bombs in the ancient city area of Palmyra, which is counted as a UNESCO World Heritage Site as it is home to some of the most extensive and best-preserved ancient Roman ruins in the world. Having lost nearly half of their territory in Iraq between 2014 and 2016, some Islamic State leaders in Iraq moved into Syria, further destabilising the region.

Starting in 2014, an international coalition of states intervened against ISIL. A number of countries, including some individual NATO members, participated in air operations in Syria that came to be overseen by the Combined Joint Task Force, set up by the US Central Command to coordinate military efforts against ISIL pursuant to their collectively undertaken commitments, including those of 3 December 2014. Those who have conducted airstrikes in Syria include the United States, Australia, Bahrain, Canada, France, Jordan, the Netherlands, Saudi Arabia, Turkey, the United Arab Emirates, and the United Kingdom. Some members are involved in the conflict beyond combating ISIL; Turkey has been accused of fighting against Kurdish forces in Syria and Iraq, including intelligence collaborations with ISIL in some cases. As of December 2017, Russia declared ISIL to be totally defeated within Syria. At the end of 2018, the US declared it defeated, although its UK and German allies disagreed. On 23 March 2019 the US-backed Syrian Democratic Forces declared ISIS Defeated, after seizing their last enclave of territory. In October 2019, the US assassinated IS leader al-Baghdadi. ISIL named Abu Ibrahim al-Hashimi as Baghdadi's successor. As of 2024, ISIL continues to be active militarily in Northeast Syria, although it has lost almost all of its territory. Instead, most of the group's activity nowadays is carried out by affiliate branches in Afghanistan, Pakistan and various countries in Africa. Some international forces have remained in Syria to carry out missions against IS members and to prevent a resurgence of the movement.

== Democratic Autonomous Administration of North and East Syria ==
The Democratic Autonomous Administration of North and East Syria, Rojava, or DAANES was a de facto autonomous region in northeastern Syria. It consisted of self-governing sub-regions in the areas of Afrin, Jazira, Euphrates, Raqqa, Tabqa, Manbij, and Deir Ez-Zor. The region gained its de facto autonomy in 2012 in the context of the then-ongoing Rojava conflict and the wider Syrian civil war, in which its official military force, the Syrian Democratic Forces (SDF), would take part. The Syrian Democratic Council was the political wing of the Syrian Democratic Forces and served as the legislative government of the AANES.

=== Syrian Democratic Council ===
The Syrian Democratic Council was established on 10 December 2015 in al-Malikiyah. It was co-founded by prominent human rights activist Haytham Manna and was intended as the political wing of the Syrian Democratic Forces. The council includes more than a dozen blocs and coalitions that support federalism in Syria, including the Movement for a Democratic Society, the Kurdish National Alliance in Syria, the Law–Citizenship–Rights Movement, and since September 2016, the Syria's Tomorrow Movement. In March 2016 the Council declared the creation of an autonomous federation in Northeast Syria and in August that year they opened a public office in al-Hasakah.

The Syrian Democratic Council was excluded from the international Geneva III peace talks on Syria in March 2016, as well as other talks since, because of opposition from the Turkish state.

=== Syrian Democratic Forces ===
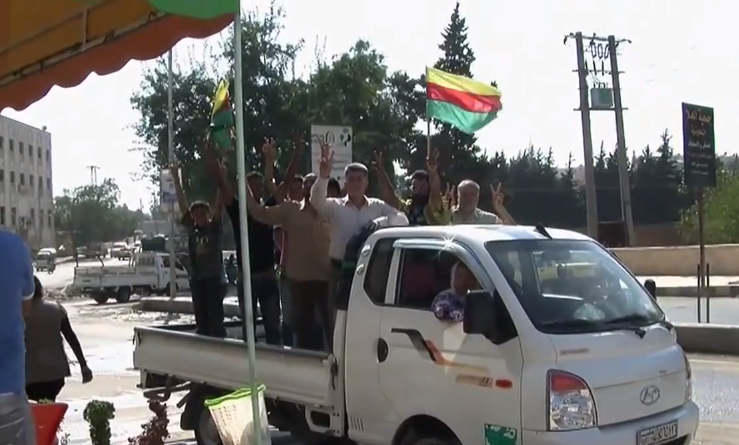
Kurds showing their support for the PYD in Afrin during the conflict

The Syrian Democratic Forces (SDF) are an alliance of mainly Kurdish but also Arab, Assyrian, and Turkmen militias with mainly left-wing and democratic confederalist political leanings. They are opposed to the Assad government, but have directed most of their efforts against Al-Nusra Front and ISIL.

The group formed in December 2015, led primarily by the predominantly Kurdish People's Protection Units (YPG). Estimates of its size range from 55,000 to 80,000 fighters. While largely Kurdish, it is estimated that about 40% of the fighters are non-Kurdish. Kurds – mostly Sunni Muslims, with a small minority of Yezidis – represented 10% of Syria's population at the start of the uprising in 2011. They had suffered from decades of discrimination and neglect, being deprived of basic civil, cultural, economic, and social rights. When protests began, Assad's government finally granted citizenship to an estimated 200,000 stateless Kurds, in an effort to try and neutralize potential Kurdish opposition. Despite this concession, most Kurds remain opposed to the government, hoping instead for a more decentralized Syria based on federalism. The Syriac Military Council, like many Assyrian militias (such as Khabour Guards, Nattoreh, and Sutoro), originally formed to defend Assyrian villages, but joined the Kurdish forces to retake Hasakah from ISIS in late 2015 The Female Protection Forces of the Land Between the Two Rivers is an all-female force of Assyrian fighters in north east Syria fighting ISIS alongside other Assyrian and Kurdish units.

The Syrian Democratic Forces have received military and economic support from the US, which regards the group as an important ally in their fight against IS.

== Other external forces ==
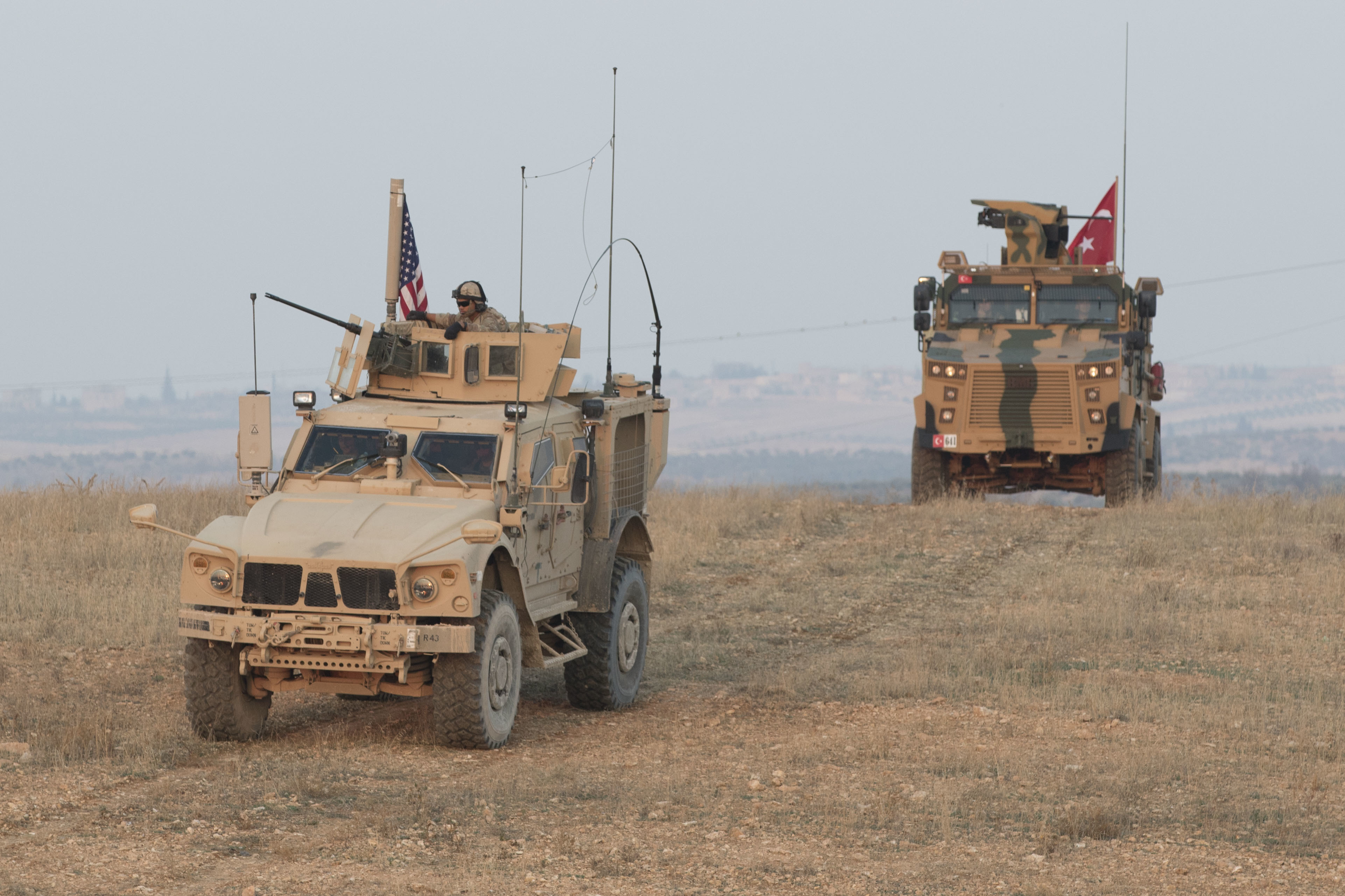
An American M-ATV and Turkish BMC Kirpi conduct joint patrols on the outskirts of Manbij, 8 November 2018

=== Turkey ===
The Turkish Air Force has launched multiple airstrikes into Syria against multiple armed factions such as the SDF, SAAF, and ISIS. Turkey has also occupied multiple regions in northern Syria.

=== US ===
The US has launched multiple targeted air raids against both ISIS and pro government forces. The United States Army has also manned the al-Tanf base and at least four other sites to support the SDF and combat ISIS.

=== Israel ===
Israel has attacked multiple Iranian militias in Syria and Axis of Resistance member Hezbollah. In April 2024 Israel launched an Israeli airstrike on the Iranian consulate in Damascus. After the fall of the Assad regime, the Syrian army abandoned its positions along the United Nations Disengagement Observer Force (UNDOF) buffer area. Subsequently, Israeli Prime Minister Benjamin Netanyahu stated that this had voided the 1974 border agreement with Syria, and ordered an invasion of Syria.

== Opposing forces during the civil war ==
Ba'athist Syria and allies	Syrian opposition and allies	Democratic Autonomous Administration of North and East Syria and allies	Islamic State and allies	Israel
Syrian Arab Armed Forces: Ministry of Defense; Syrian Army; Republican Guard; 100th Artillery Regiment; 101st Infantry Regiment; 102nd Infantry Regiment; 103rd Commando Brigade; Syrian Marines; 104th Airborne Brigade; 105th Mechanized Brigade; 107th Artillery Regiment; 108th Armoured Regiment; 109th Armoured Regiment; 151st Mechanized Regiment; 152nd Mechanized Regiment; 800th Regiment; Lionesses of Defence Armoured Brigade; Popular Security and Support Forces; 30th Division; Quwat al-Ghadab volunteers; 4th Armoured Division; 38th Armoured Brigade; 40th Armoured Brigade; 41st Armoured Brigade; 42nd Armoured Brigade; 138th Mechanized Brigade; 154th Artillery Regiment; 333rd Infantry Regiment; 555th SF (airborne) Regiment; 666th Infantry Regiment; Al-Imam Hussein Brigade; Harakat Hezbollah al-Nujaba Syrian-wing; Protective Lions; Special Forces Command; Tiger Forces; Panther Forces Brigade; Cheetah Forces Brigade; Leopard Forces Brigade; Desert Hawks Brigade; 1st Corps; 5th Mechanized Division; 6th Armoured Division; 7th Mechanized Division; 9th Armoured Division; 15th Special Forces Division; 2nd Corps; 1st Armoured Division; 2nd Armoured Division; 10th Mechanized Division; 14th Special Forces Division; 3rd Corps; 3rd Armoured Division; Qalamoun Shield Forces; 8th Armoured Division; 11th Armoured Division; 17th Division; 18th Armoured Division; Syrian Border Guard Forces; Infantry Border Guard Brigade; Lion Shield Forces; Martyr or Victory; Ba'ath Legion, formed from Ba'ath Brigades volunteers; Homeland Shield Forces; Elite Light Infantry Brigade; 5th Assault Corps; Ba'ath Brigades; Liwa al-Quds; Lions of al-Quds Battalion; Defenders of Aleppo Battalion; Deterrence Battalion; Lions of al-Shahba Battalion; Syrian Air Force; Syrian Air Defense Force; Syrian Arab Navy; National Defence Forces; Lijan Militias; Shabiha; Golan Regiment; First Battalion; Second Battalion; Third Battalion; National Shield of the Patriotic Forces; Al-Quneitra Hawks Brigade; Ta'ie Tribal Militias; Abu Jabal Brigade; Free Patriots Brigade; Saidnaya NDF Militias; Taybat al-Imam unit; Hama City unit; Units from Suqaylabia; Units from Muhrada; Units from Masyaf; As-Suwayda NDF volunteers; Palmyrene NDF Garrison; Hermon Regiment; Loyalist Tribal Militias; Quwat Dir' al-Watan; Local Defence Forces; Fawj Shuhada Nubl wa al-Zahraa; Qamr Bani Hashim Division; 313 Force; Special Assignments Battalion; Lions of Hussein; Tribes of Manbij Regiment; Safira Regiment; Nayrab Battalion – Special Operations; Militias from Nubl and al-Zahraa; Military Intelligence Directorate; Military Security Shield Forces; Military Security Falcons; Southern Shield Brigade; al-Assad Shield Forces; Desert Commandos Regiment; Lions of Hamidiya; Forces of the Fighters of the Tribes; Falcons of the Euphrates; Popular Resistance of the Eastern Region; Syrian Resistance; Falcons of the Jazira and Euphrates; Air Force Intelligence Directorate; (Ba'athist Syria) Guardians of the Dawn; Lions of the Cherubim; Earthquake of Jobar; Ararat Group; Lions of the Valley; Intervention Regiment; Lions of Dwel’a; Khaybar Brigade; Nusur Homs Regiment; Unit 333; Sahabat Group; (Ba'athist Syria) Police forces: Ministry of Interior; Syrian Police; Political Security Directorate; General Intelligence Directorate; Criminal Security Directorate; Syrian Special Mission Forces; Allied armed groups: Syrian Social Nationalist Party; Eagles of the Whirlwind; Al-Suqaylabiyah Unit; Mahardah Unit; Arab Nationalist Guard; Syrian National Resistance; Kafr Saghir Martyrs Brigade (unclear); Sootoro; Saraya al-Areen; Al-Jabalawi Battalion; Harakat Abna al-Jazeera wal Furat; Popular Resistance in Hasakah; Popular Resistance in Manbij; People's Army; Loyalist Army; Homeland Protection Forces; Saladin Brigade; Shield of the Coast; Shield of the Lion's Lair; Brigades of the Den; Al-Awda (Allegedly); Tribal Bedouin militias; Lions of the Ougaidat Brigade; Hashemite Tribes Regiment; Hashemiyoun; 47th Regiment; al-Hosn tribe militias; al-Berri tribe militias; Tayy tribe militias; Raqqawi Tribe Militias; al-Jihesh Tribe Militias; Arab Tribal and Clan Forces; Druze Militias; Army of Monotheists; Men of Dignity; Forces of Abu Ibrahim; Bayraq al-Suwayda; (Ba'athist Syria) Kata'ib Humat al-Diyar; Al-Jabal Brigade; Rocks of Urman Battalion; Jalamid Urman Brigade; al-Zaghaba; Ammar bin Yasir; al-Suqur; al-Basha; Palestinian Militias; PFLP–GC; Jihad Jibril Brigades; Popular Committee-Yarmouk Refugee Camp; (Palestine) Palestinian People's Party; As-Sa'iqa; Fatah al-Intifada; Palestine Liberation Army; Free Palestine Movement; (Palestine) Galilee Forces; PPSF; Far-right volunteers; Russian Imperial Movement; Imperial Legion; Falanga volunteers; Third Way; (Greece) Greek nationalists; Golden Dawn; Mávros Krínos; Economic and political support: Forza Nuova; Casapound; Private military companies: ISIS Hunters; Redut; Slavonic Corps (until 2013); ENOT Corp (until 2019); 12th Peacekeeping Brigade; Fulfilled Legion; Arab Socialist Ba'ath Party – Lebanon Region; Arab Unification Party; Shia Militias; Baqir Brigade (until 2024); (Ba'athist Syria) Liwa Sayf al-Mahdi; Hezbollah; Redwan Force; Unit 910; Hezbollah Rocket Division; 45th independent SF Regiment; 47th independent SF Regiment; 53rd independent SF Regiment; 54th independent SF Regiment; Lebanese Resistance Brigades; Syrian Hezbollah; Quwat al-Ridha; Liwa al-Imam al-Mahdi; National Ideological Resistance; Imam Hujja Regiment; Al-Ghalibun; Saryat al-Shaheed Abu Yasir; Saryat al-'Ishq; Kashafat al-Wilaya; Return Forces; Imam al-Mahdi Scouts; Fatima al-Zahara Regiment (Fawj al-Fatima al-Zahra); Amal Movement (denied by Amal); Popular Mobilization Forces (Shia groups only); Kataib Sayyid al-Shuhada; Badr Organization; Forces of Martyr Muhammed Baqir al-Sadr; Asa'ib Ahl al-Haq; Kafeel Zainab Brigade; Haidar al-Karar Brigades; Kata'ib Hezbollah; Harakat Hezbollah al-Nujaba; Golan Liberation Brigade; Ammar ibn Yasir Brigade; Peace Companies; Kata'ib al-Imam Ali; Iraqi Liberation Movement; Jaysh al-Wafaa; Harakat al-Abdal; Promised Day Brigade; Saraya al-Khorasani; Saraya al-Jihad; Dir’ al Wilaya Brigades; Saraya Ansar al-Aqeeda; Harakat Ansar Allah al-Awfiya; Jihad Companies; Liwa Zulfiqar; Homeland Shield Brigade; LAAG (Liwa Assad Allah al-Ghalib fi al-Iraq wa al-Sham); Abu al-Fadl al-Abbas Forces; Jaysh al-Mu'ammal; Houthis; Leopards of Homs; Liwa al-Imam al-Hussein; Jaafariyah Force; Sayyida al Raqqia Brigade; Liwa Fatemiyoun; Hazrat-e Abolfazl Brigade; Hazrat-e Fatemeh Zahra Brigade; Liwa Zainebiyoun; Liwa Abu al-Fadhal al-Abbas; Hussainiyoun (Islamic Resistance Movement of Azerbaijan); Mukhtar Army; Al-Mukhtar Brigades; Iran (2013–December 6, 2024): Iranian Armed Forces; IRGC; Quds Force; Basij; 17th Ali ibn Abi Taleb Division; Nakhsa; IRGC Aerospace Force; IRGC Ground Forces; Saberin Unit; 110th Salman Farsi Special Operations Brigade; 25th Karbala Division; Imam Sajjad Takavar Brigade of Kazerun; Isfahan division; 102nd Imam Hossein Battalion; Alborz Division; Syrian auxiliaries; 313 Battalion; Ali Sultan Battalion; Liwa al-Mukhtar al-Thiqfi; Ruhollah Formations; Iranian Army; Islamic Republic of Iran Army Ground Forces; NOHED Brigade (advisory role); Iranian Air Force (transportation and logistics); Russia (2015–2024): Russian Armed Forces; Russian Air Force; Russian Navy; Russian Naval Infantry; Russian Aerospace Forces; General Staff; GRU; Spetsnaz GRU; 431st Naval Reconnaissance Spetsnaz Point; Special Operations Command; Special Operations Forces; Russian Ground Forces; 29th Combined Arms Army; Military Police; 2nd Guards Motor Rifle Division; 74th Guards Motor Rifle Brigade; Russian Engineer Troops; Russian Airborne Forces; 31st Guards Air Assault Brigade; 45th Guards Spetsnaz Brigade; 56th Guards Air Assault Regiment; Federal Security Service; Spetsgruppa "K" advisors; Foreign Intelligence Service (SVR); (Chechnya) Kadyrovites; Wagner Group; 5 Storm unit; DShRG Rusich; The Other Russia of E. V. Limonov; Interbrigades; Thorbrandr (Scandinavian volunteers); Armament support: Russia (until 2024); Iran (until 6 December 2024); China; Israel; Facility support: Iraq (2013); Iraq (limited airstrikes on IS in eastern Syria, 2017): Iraqi Armed Forces; Iraqi Air Force	Syrian Interim Government: (Syrian opposition) Free Syrian Army (decentralized from 2015); Syrian National Army; Northern Brigade; (Syrian opposition) 9th Division; (Syrian opposition) Jaysh al-Ahfad; Sultan Mehmed the Conqueror Brigade; (Syrian opposition) Waqqas Brigade; (Syrian opposition) Jaysh al-Sharqiya; (Syrian opposition) Ahrar al-Sharqiya; Muntasir Billah Brigade; Sultan Murad Division; (Syrian opposition) Hamza Division; Mu'tasim Division; Sultan Suleiman Shah Division; (Syrian opposition) Levant Front; (Syrian opposition) 51st Division; Samarkand Brigade; (Syrian opposition) Glory Corps; 20th Division; (Syrian opposition) Peace Brigade; (Syrian opposition) Al-Rahman Legion; (Syrian opposition) Special Forces Division; (Syrian opposition) Sultan Malik-Shah Brigade; Elite Brigade; Conqueror Lions Brigade (until 2018); Resolute Storm Brigade (unknown since 2018); Hasakah Shield Brigade (unknown since 2018); Jaysh Ansar al-Allah (unknown since 2018); Anwar al-Hak Brigade (unknown since 2019); Mimati battalion (unknown since 2019); 5th Regiment (unknown since 2019); 1st Commandos Brigade (unknown since 2019); Authenticity and Development Front (unknown since 2020); Elite Division (unknown since 2020); Liwa Ansar al-Sunnah (unknown since 2020); Al-Fauj al-Awwal (unknown since 2021); Ghazal base (unknown since 2021); Mustafa Regiment (unknown since 2021); National Front for Liberation; Sham Legion; (Syrian opposition) Jaysh al-Nasr; Jaysh al-Nukhba; (Syrian opposition) Jaysh al-Thani; (Syrian opposition) 1st Infantry Division (Idlib); Freedom Brigade; (Syrian opposition) Free Hayan Brigade; (Syrian opposition) Freeman of the Levant Brigade; (Syrian opposition) Central Division; Coastal Division; 60th Infantry Division; 1st Coastal Division (until 2023); 2nd Coastal Division (until 2023); (Syrian opposition) Free Idlib Army (until 2023); 23rd Division (until 2023); (Syrian opposition) Al-Tanf Garrison; (Syrian opposition) Syrian Free Army; (Syrian opposition) Lions of the East Army; (Syrian opposition) Forces of Martyr Ahmad al-Abdo; (Syrian opposition) Army of Free Tribes; (Syrian opposition) Qaryatayn Martyrs Brigade; Jaysh al-Izza; (Syria) Burkan al-Furat; Southern Front (until 2018); Revolutionary Army; Yarmouk Army; Mu'tazz Billah Army; Muhajireen and Ansar Brigade; Hasan ibn Ali Brigade; Dawn of Islam Division; Firqat Ahrar Nawa; Alliance of Southern Forces; (Syrian opposition) Omari Brigades; (Syrian opposition) 18 March Division; 46th infantry division; Division of Decisiveness; Division of Righteousness; 1st Special Tasks Brigade; Salvation Army; Brigade of Dignity; First Corps; 8th Infantry Brigade; 19th Infantry Brigade; 21st Infantry Division; 55th Infantry Brigade; 99th Infantry Division; Victory Division; Dawn of Liberation Division; Knights of Freedom Division; Oasifat Free South Division; Sajeel Division; Company of Dignity Division; Harra Martyrs Brigade; Southern Alliance; (Syrian opposition) Syrian Revolutionaries Front; 1st Infantry Division (Daraa); First Gathering; 3rd Brigade; 86th Infantry Brigade; Ansar al-Haqq Battalion; Barq Islam Brigade; Bayareq Islam Battalion; Norman Bin Monther Battalion; Osod Yarmouk Battalion; Shabab Horiyah Brigade; Shahid Tareq Sbihi Battalion; Soyof Tahrir; Southern Brigades; Al Mukhtar Brigade; Descendants of Ibn al-Walid Brigade; Free Daraa Brigade; Supporters of the Sunna Brigade; Farouq Mujahideen Brigade; Al-Amryn al-Islami Brigade; Northern Commandos Brigade; Qastat of Muslims Brigade; Soldiers of Islam Brigade; Al-Murabitin Brigade; Servants of al-Rahman Division; Tawhid Army; Alwiya al-Furqan; (Syrian opposition) Quneitra Military Council; Youth of Sunna Forces; (Syrian opposition) Hamza Division; Lions of Sunna Brigade; (Syrian opposition) Saif al-Sham Brigade; (Syrian opposition) Tawhid Kata’ib Horan; Mujahideen of Hawran Brigades; Martyr Raed al-Masri Brigade; Liwa Awwal Mahaam Khassa; Quneitra and the Golan Heights Military Council; Golan Knights Brigade; Supporters of al-Huda; Mutasim Billah Brigadel; Western Countryside Freemen Battalion; Martyrs of Damascus Brigades; Martyrs of Al-Hara Brigade; Al-Sabtain Brigade; (Syrian opposition) Daraa Military Council (until 2015); (Syrian opposition) First Army (2015); (Syrian opposition) Hawks of the South (until 2016); 406th Infantry Division; National Front for the Liberation of Syria (until 2018); Jabhat Ansar al-Islam; Army of the South (2018); (Syrian opposition) Jaysh al-Ababil; Alawiyat al-Qasioun; Alawiyat jidor horan; Revolutionary Army of the Jidor Area; Holding Fast Operations Room; al-Hara Military Council; Tasil Military Council; Swords of Truth Room; Liwa Ahrar Qita; Manifest Victory Operations Room; Aligned Factions of the Eastern Region; Ahrar al-Jazeera (until 2014); Khalid ibn al-Walid Brigade (until 2014); (Syrian opposition) Saddam Hussein Martyrs Brigade (until 2014); Damascus Military Council (until 2014); (Syrian opposition) Ahfad al-Rasul Brigades (until 2014); Farouq Brigades (until 2014); Liwa Owais al-Qorani (until 2014); Hazzm Movement (until 2015); Syrian Salvation Front (until 2015); Saladin Ayubi Brigade (until 2015); Shields of the Revolution Council (until 2015); Al-Haramein Battalion (unknown since 2015); Fastaqim Union (until 2017); Army of Mujahideen (until 2017); Jaysh al-Sunna (until 2017); Descendants of Saladin Brigade (until 2017); Islamic Freedom Battalitons (unknown since 2017); (Syrian opposition) 1st Squad of Aleppo (unknown since 2017); Alpasian Special Forces (unknown since 2017); (Syrian opposition) 1st Security Division of Aleppo (unknown since 2017); (Syrian opposition) Tajamuu Al-Qaqaa (unknown since 2017); (Syrian opposition) 10th Brigade (unknown since 2017); (Syrian opposition) Northern Thunder Brigade (unknown since 2017); 21st Combined Force (unknown since 2017); (Syrian opposition) Sham Liberation Army (unknown since 2018); (Syrian opposition) Fursan al-Joulan (until 2019); (Syrian opposition) Southern Operations Room: (Syrian opposition) Eighth Brigade; (Syrian opposition) Central Committees; Al-Jabal Brigade; Sheikh al-Karama Forces; Men of Dignity; (Syrian opposition) Daraa Tribe Council; (Syrian opposition) Horan Free Gathering; Ahrar al-Sham (NFL-aligned); Jaysh al-Islam (SNA-aligned) (Syrian opposition) Suqour al-Sham Brigades; Nour al-Din al-Zenki Movement (SNA-aligned); Maghawir al-Sham (SNA-aligned); Jaysh al-Ahrar (NFL-aligned); Damascus Gathering (NFL-aligned) (Syrian opposition) Suqour al-Sham-40th Division (NFL-aligned) (Syria) Al-Busraya Revolutionaries; Islamic Unity and Liberation Front (until 2013); Kurdish Islamic Front (until 2014); Liwa al-Haqq (until 2014); Al-Tawhid Brigade (until 2014); Jaysh al-Sham (2014); Jaysh al-Ummah (until 2015); Omar Brigade (until 2015); Liwaa al-Umma (until 2015); Ansar al-Khilafah (until 2015); Ansar al-Sham (until 2017); Ajnad al-Sham (until 2017); Liwa al-Haqq (until 2017); Ajnad al-Sham Islamic Union (until 2018); Abu Amara Special Tasks Battalions (unknown since 2018); Movement of Salah al-Din the Kurd (unknown since 2019) (Syrian opposition) (Turkey) Police forces: Free Police; Special Forces; Ex-Free East Ghouta Police forces; Allied armed groups: Grey Wolves; Muslim Brotherhood; Muslim Brotherhood in Syria; Hamas (2012–22); Aknaf Bait al-Maqdis; Free Iraqi Army; Army of Islam (Gaza Strip); Turkey (from 2016): Turkish Armed Forces; Turkish Land Forces; First Army; 7th Commando Brigade; Second Army; 1st Commando Brigade; 5th Commando Brigade; 3rd Commando Brigade; 4th Commando Brigade; 11th Commando Brigade; Third Army; Gendarmerie General Command; Gendarmerie Special Public Security Command; Gendarmerie Special Operations (JÖH); Village Guards System; Turkish Air Force; Turkish Naval Forces; SAT; SAS; Marines; General Staff; Special Forces Command; General Directorate of Security; Police Special Operation Department (PÖH); National Intelligence Organization (MİT); United States (against IS, 2014–2017, and limited strikes against pro-government forces, 2017–2018): (United States) US Armed Forces; US Army; US Air Force; US Navy; US Army Special Forces; United Kingdom (limited strikes against pro-government forces, 2017–2018): (United Kingdom) British Armed Forces; Royal Air Force; France (limited strikes against pro-government forces, 2017–2018): French Air Force; French Navy; Armament support: Qatar; Turkey; Saudi Arabia (2012–17); France (2011–18); Netherlands (2014–18); Norway (2016–18); United States (2011–17); Central Intelligence Agency; United Kingdom (2011–18); Secret Intelligence Service (unconfirmed); Bahrain (2012–16); Jordan (2012–17); United Arab Emirates (2012–16); Libya; Egypt (2012–13); Israel; Support: Canada (2012–18); Germany (2012–18); Syrian Salvation Government (2017–2024): Hay'at Tahrir al-Sham (from 2017); Turkistan Islamic Party in Syria; Imam Bukhari Jamaat; Ajnad al-Kavkaz; Ansar al-Tawhid (aligned with HTS since 2018); Jama'at Ansar al-Islam (aligned with HTS since 2021); Junud al-Makhdi (until 2017); Tarkhan's Jamaat (unknown since 2018); Jama'at Ansar al-Haq (unknown since 2019); Caucasus Emirate (until 2019); Junud al-Sham (until 2021) Support: Turkey; Qatar (until 2017); Al-Qaeda: Al-Nusra Front (until 2017); Jund al-Aqsa (until 2017); Hurras al-Din; Ansar al-Din Front; Ansar Fighters Brigade; Jama'at Ansar al-Furqan in Bilad al Sham (2017); Brigade of al-Qaka (unknown since 2012); Tawhid and Punishment Battalions and Brigades (unknown since 2013); Sadqa Wa'dah Movement (unknown since 2016); Jundallah (until 2021); Jund al-Islam (unknown since 2021); Ansar Abu Bakr al-Siddiq (2022); Jihad Coordination (until 2023) Ukraine: Special forces (against Russia only); Main Directorate of Intelligence	Syrian Democratic Forces: Democratic Union Party; People's Protection Units (YPG); Women's Protection Units (YPJ); Syriac Union Party; Syriac Military Council; Peshmerga Roj; Special Forces Regiment; Sapper unit; Shammer tribe militias; Al-Sanadid Forces; Hêzên Komandos; Raqqa Martyrs Brigade; Raqqa Regiment; Jazeera Knights; Free Officers Union (unclear); Harun al-Rashid Brigade; Northern Brigade faction; Sireen Military Council; Ashrafieh Liberation Forces; Sheikh Maqsoud Liberation Forces; Martyr Nubar Ozanyan Brigade; Wrath of Olives; Martyr Amara Arab Women's Battalion; Jazira Region Young Women's Union volunteers; Euphrates Region Young Women Union volunteers; Battalion of Karachok Martyrs; Al-Shaitat tribe militias; Revolutionary Forces; Brigade for the Liberation of Idlib and Afrin; Afrin Liberation Forces; Afrin Falcons; Harabiyya tribe militias; Ajeel tribe militias; Al-Baggara tribe militias; Zubayd tribe militias; Pro-SDF Free Syrian Army groups; Syria's Tomorrow Movement; (Syrian opposition) Elite Forces (unclear); Army of Revolutionaries; Kurdish Front; Seljuk Brigade; Division 30 (Until 2015); Euphrates Jarabulus Battalions; Northern Democratic Brigade; (Syrian opposition) Liberation Brigade; Liwa Ahrar al-Raqqa; Raqqa Hawks Brigade; Liwa Jund al-Haramain; Idlib Revolutionaries Brigade; (Syrian opposition) Arab Ahwaz Brigade; Liwa Umana al-Raqqa (until 2014); (Syria) Jarabulus Company (until 2014); (Syria) Retribution Army (until 2015); (Syrian opposition) Dawn of Freedom Brigades (Until 2015); Liwa Thuwar al-Raqqa (until 2018); SDF Military Councils: Manbij Military Council; Northern Sun Battalion; Euphrates Liberation Brigade; Manbij Hawks Brigade; Manbij Revolutionaries Battalion; Martyr Adnan Abu Amjad Regiment; Martyr Abdo Dushka Regiment; al-Bab Military Council; Al-Bab Revolutionary Front; Qebasîn Martyrs Brigade; Al-Bab Countryside Martyrs Battalion; Free Arima Battalion; Martyr Silo al-Rai Brigade; Kieba Martyrs Brigade; Female Battalion; Jarabulus Military Council; Jarabulus Hawks Battalion; Free Jarabulus Battalion; Deir ez-Zor Military Council; Gathering of al-Baggara Youth; Khabat al-Sha'iti Battalion; Hajin battalion; DZMC military units; Local tribal forces; Idlib Military Council; Serê Kaniyê Military Council; Ayn Issa Military Council; Martyr Ilan Kobanê Brigade; Martyr Adel Manbij Brigade; Thuwar Tal Abyad; Annaba Clan Volunteers; Tal Abyad Military Council; Qamishli Military Council; Raqqa Military Council; Hasakah Military Council; Al-Shaddadi Military Council; (Democratic Autonomous Administration of North and East Syria) Police forces: Northern Syria Internal Security Forces; Asayish; Anti-Terror Forces (HAT SWAT units); Manbij Internal Security Forces; Quick Reaction Force unit; Raqqa Internal Security Forces; Quick Reaction Force unit; Deir ez-Zor Internal Security Forces; Quick Reaction Force unit; Sutoro; Bethnahrain Women's Protection Forces police branch; (Democratic Autonomous Administration of North and East Syria) Civilian defence units: Self-Defense Forces (HXP); Military Discipline Units; Special Forces; Civilian Defense Force (HPC); Syrian Border Security Force (BSF); Allied armed groups: Kurdistan Workers' Party; People's Defence Forces; Free Women's Units; People's Liberation Faction; International Freedom Battalion; MLKP; TKP/TIKKO; MKP; United Freedom Forces; THKP-C/MLSPB; DKP/BOG; Türkiye Devrim Partisi; Sosyal İsyan; Kadın Özgürlük Gücü; Devrimci Karargâh; PML (RC); TKEP/L; RUIS; IRPGF; The Queer Insurrection and Liberation Army; Michael Israel Brigade; Anarchist Struggle; Henri Krasucki Brigade; Bob Crow Brigade; Revolutionary Anarchist Action (DAF); No Surrender Motorcycle Club; Peoples' United Revolutionary Movement; Anti-Turkish insurgents in Afrin District; Sinjar Alliance; Sinjar Resistance Units; Êzîdxan Women's Units; Kurdistan Freedom Party; Iraqi Kurdistan: Peshmerga; KDP Peshmerga; PUK Peshmerga; CTG Special Forces; Kurdistan Region; Iraq (until 20 November 2018): Iraqi Armed Forces ( – 20 May November 2018); Iraqi Ground Forces ( – 20 June November 2018); Counter Terrorism Service; (Iraq) Iraqi Security Forces; Armament support: Iraqi Kurdistan; Kurdistan Democratic Party; Patriotic Union of Kurdistan; France; Israel; United States; Russia (sometimes); United Arab Emirates; Saudi Arabia (from 2018); Italy; Syria (sometimes; until 2024); CJTF-OIR (against IS): United States (also supported SDF in clashes with pro-government forces, 2017–present); US Armed Forces; US Army; United States Army Special Operations Command; Delta Force; 75th Ranger Regiment; 5th Special Forces Group; XVIII Airborne Corps; 82nd Airborne Division; 101st Airborne Division; 10th Mountain Division; III Armored Corps; 1st Infantry Division; US Air Force; United States Air Force Tactical Air Control Party; United States Air Force Combat Control Team; 9th Bomb Squadron; 432nd Wing; US Navy; US Marine Corps; 11th Marine Expeditionary Unit; 1st Battalion, 4th Marines; United States Marine Forces Special Operations Command; Marine Raiders; Central Intelligence Agency; Timber Sycamore; United Kingdom; British Armed Forces; British Army; Royal Regiment of Scotland; 2nd Battalion; 4th Battalion; Rifles Regiment; 1st Battalion; 2nd Battalion; 3rd Battalion; 4th Battalion; Royal Yorkshire Regiment; 2nd Battalion; Royal Princess of Wales Regiment; 2nd Battalion; 22 Engineer Regiment; 5 Armoured Engineer Squadron; Welsh Guards; 1st Battalion; Irish Guards; 1st Battalion; Grenadier Guards; 1st Battalion; Duke Of Lancaster's Regiment; 2nd Battalion; Royal Air Force; No. 617 Squadron RAF; Royal Navy; HMS Queen Elizabeth; United Kingdom Special Forces; Special Air Service; France; (France) French Armed Forces; French Army; French Air Force; French Navy; Charles de Gaulle; French SOF; Germany; German Air Force; German KSK (denied by Germany); Netherlands; Royal Netherlands Air and Space Force; Norway; Jordan; Saudi Arabia; United Arab Emirates; Iraq (limited airstrikes and border operations against IS in northern Syria, June – Nov 2018): Iraqi Air Force (until 20 November 2018); Iraqi Ground Forces (until 20 November 2018); Former: Canada (2014–16); Denmark (2014–16); Belgium (2014–17); Australia (2015–17); Morocco (2014–16); Bahrain (2014–16); Qatar (2014–16); Turkey (2014–15); Russia (against IS and Turkish-backed rebels, 2015–17): Russian Air Force	Islamic State Forces: (Islamic State) Ansar al-Aqsa; Liwa Dawud (until 2014); Liwa Aqab al-Islami until 2014); Group of the One and Only (until 2016); Katiba al-Bittar al-Libi (until 2016); Dokumacılar (until 2017); (Islamic State) Jamaat Bayt al-Maqdis al-Islamiya (Until 2017); Al-Khansaa Brigade (until 2019); Khalid ibn al-Walid Army (until 2020)	Israel Defense Forces: Israeli Ground Forces; 36th Division; 7th Brigade; 98th Division; 35th Brigade; Oz Brigade; 210th Division; 474th Brigade; 55th Paratroopers Brigade; 810th Brigade; Israeli Air Force; 7th Wing; Unit 5101; Unit 669; Israeli Navy; Military Intelligence Directorate; Sayeret Matkal; Israel Police: Israel Border Police

== Foreign support ==
Military situation in Syria as of February 2026: Controlled by Syrian transitional government (includes TAF) Controlled by Kurdish groups (SDF) Controlled by local Druze factions Controlled by Israeli Defense Forces Controlled by Assadist insurgents Controlled by the Islamic State (IS); (For a more detailed, interactive map, see Template:Syrian Civil War detailed map.)

- The United States alleged that Belarus and Cuba provided or attempted to provide direct military support to the Syrian government. Both countries have denied this. There are also unconfirmed reports that Algeria provided military support to the Syrian government.
- There was regular conflict between the different rebel groups in the inter-rebel conflict during the Syrian Civil War.
- Jund al-Aqsa was allied with al-Nusra Front and other rebels as part of the Army of Conquest, which the group left in October 2015 and subsequently was accused of being allied with IS, taking part in IS-led offensives such as the 2016 Khanasir offensive. However, Jund al-Aqsa again worked with the Army of Conquest and other rebels during the 2016 Southern Aleppo campaign. Eventually most of Jund al-Aqsa joined al-Nusra. Conflict between the two broke out in 2017.
- The Kurdish National Council joined the Syrian National Coalition—though without officially committing any military forces to the opposition—while simultaneously retaining its membership in the Kurdish Supreme Committee, alongside the PYD.
- Canada withdrew jet fighters from the US-led coalition against IS on 15 February 2016.
- The Syriac Military Council (including Bethnahrain Women's Protection Forces), Sutoro, Ashur Forces (Khabour Guards and Nattoreh) represented the Assyrian people of Syria.
- Turkey was part of the CJTF–OIR against IS, but also fought against the SDF, which was supported by CJTF–OIR.
- Russia provides air support to the Syrian Ba'athist government. Previously, it also provided air support to Turkey and the Syrian Democratic Forces against IS and some Syrian rebel groups, respectively, but not against one another.
- Serbia, a traditional ally of Russia who supported the Assad government, had assisted Russian troops in humanitarian missions on multiple occasions.
- Armenia, Egypt, Venezuela, Algeria, and China sent non-lethal support to the Syrian Government.

== See also ==
- Combatants of the Iraq War
- Foreign involvement in the Syrian civil war
- Foreign fighters in the Syrian Civil War and War in Iraq
- List of armed groups in the War in Iraq (2013–2017)
- List of armed groups in the Second Libyan Civil War
- List of armed groups in the Yemeni Civil War
- List of armed groups in the Syrian civil war spillover in Lebanon
- Spillover of the Syrian civil war

== Bibliography ==
- Ripley, Tim (2018). Operation Aleppo: Russia's War in Syria. Lancaster: Telic-Herrick Publications. ISBN 978-0-9929458-2-4.
