= Jaysh al-Sham (2015) =

Jaish al-Sham
- Dates active: 9 October 2015 - present
- Active regions: Aleppo Governorate, Syria; Idlib Governorate, Syria; Hama Governorate, Syria
- Size: ~1,000 - ~5,000
- Wars: the Syrian Civil War

Jaish al-Sham is an Islamist group fighting in the Syrian Civil War that is an offshoot of Ahrar ash-Sham.

== See also ==
- List of armed groups in the Syrian Civil War
