= Jaysh al-Mu'ammal =

Shia Islamist Iraqi private militia

- Logo of Jaysh al-Mu'ammal; the text reads "The Islamic Resistance Movement in Iraq and al-Sham [Syria]: Jaysh al-Mu'ammal"
- Leader: Sa'ad Sawar
- Split from: Sadrist Movement (Peace Companies)
- Headquarters: Sadr City, Baghdad
- Active regions: Iraq; Syria (until 2024)
- Ideology: Shia Islamism; Sadrist Thought; Shia solidarity
- Size: Unknown
- Part of: Popular Mobilization Forces
- Wars: the Iraqi Civil War (2014–2017) and the Syrian Civil War

Jaysh al-Mu'ammal (Arabic: جَيْش الْمُؤَمَّل, romanized: Jayš al-Muʾammal, lit. 'The Expected Army'), also known as Liwa al-Mu'ammal or as the Popular Mobilization Forces' 99th Brigade, is a Shia Islamist Iraqi private militia that is led by Sa'ad Sawar and has fought in the Syrian Civil War and Iraqi Civil War. Founded as a splinter faction of the Sadrist Movement, Jaysh al-Mu'ammal is supported by Iran and former Iraqi Prime Minister Nouri al-Maliki.

== History ==
Jaysh al-Mu'ammal reportedly emerged due to disputes among the Iraqi Sadrist Movement. After the Syrian Civil War's outbreak, Muqtada al-Sadr had decided not to aid the Syrian government of Bashar al-Assad, which led to discontent among his followers. One of the leading commanders of the Sadrist Peace Companies, Sa'ad Sawar, openly broke with Muqtada al-Sadr and travelled to Damascus, where he joined another Iraqi militia, Liwa Assad Allah al-Ghalib fi al-Iraq wa al-Sham, to fight against the Syrian insurgents.

As time went on, disputes over the leadership and course of the Sadrist Movement continued, with a number of factions breaking off. After returning to Iraq, Sa'ad Sawar consequently managed to rally a substantial number of dissatisfied Sadrists to his cause, and announced the foundation of "Jaysh al-Mu'ammal" in June 2016. The new group reportedly received substantial aid from Nouri al-Maliki, the former Prime Minister of Iraq and a rival to Muqtada al-Sadr, who provided Jaysh al-Mu'ammal with 3 million United States dollar in cash, weapons worth $1,5 million, and the support from a number of tribal sheikhs in central and southern Iraq. Sa'ad Sawar also received support from Iran and other splinter faction of the Sadrist Movements as well, such as Asa'ib Ahl al-Haq.

Since then, Jaysh al-Mu'ammal has been operating in Syria and Iraq, where it has joined the Popular Mobilization Forces as "99th Brigade". By mid-2018, Jaysh al-Mu'ammal was involved in anti-ISIL counter-insurgency operations in Saladin Governorate.

== Organization and ideology ==
Led by Sa'ad Sawar, Jaysh al-Mu'ammal is headquartered in Sadr City, Baghdad, where it also recruits most of its forces. A number of pro-Nouri al-Maliki elements in central and southern Iraq have also joined the group or at least provide support.

Unlike Muqtada al-Sadr, who is focused on Iraq, Sa'ad Sawar has emphasized his readiness to provide military support to Shia groups outside of his home country. His group consequently operates in both Iraq as well as Syria, and has also declared its willingness to support the Houthis in the Yemeni Civil War, and to fight with the Bahraini opposition against the Sunni House of Khalifa.

== See also ==
- List of armed groups in the Iraqi Civil War
- List of armed groups in the Syrian Civil War
- Liwa Abu al-Fadhal al-Abbas

== Bibliography ==
- AFPC (2017). The World Almanac of Islamism 2017. Lanham, Maryland; London; New York City: Rowman & Littlefield. ISBN 978-1442273443.
