= Syrian Desert campaign (May–July 2017) =

Military operation of the Syrian Army

- Part of the Syrian civil war and the Russian military intervention in Syria
- Controlled by the Syrian government; Controlled by the Syrian opposition; Controlled by the Iraqi government; Controlled by the Islamic State of Iraq and the Levant
Date	7 May – 13 July 2017 (2 months and 6 days)
Location	Syrian Desert, Syria: South, eastern and central Homs Governorate; Eastern as-Suwayda Governorate; South and eastern Rif Dimashq Governorate
Status	Decisive Syrian military and allies victory: In late May, Syrian Army captured over 20,000 km^{2} of territory, including the Damascus–Palmyra highway and a large part of the eastern half of As-Suwayda province; Syrian Army secured part of Syrian–Iraqi border for the first time since 2015, at the same time erasing the frontline between US-backed forces and ISIL; Syrian Army approaches and enters the province of Deir ez-Zor Governorate from the south, cutting the Al-Qaim-Al-Sukhnah road; By mid-July, Syrian Army captured 3,000 km^{2} of territory from the FSA in the northeastern part As-Suwayda province and southern Rif Dimashq province

Belligerents
(Syria) Syrian Arab Republic: Syrian Armed Forces; Pro-gov. militias; Russia; Iran; Allied militias: PMF-affiliated militias Hezbollah; Liwa Fatemiyoun; Supported by: UAE; Egypt	(Syrian opposition) Free Syrian Army; Supported by: United States; Jordan; United Kingdom; France; Norway	Islamic State of Iraq and the Levant (since 23 May)

Commanders and leaders
(Iran) Maj. Gen. Qasem Soleimani (Quds Force chief commander); Mowafiq As'ad (Chief of staff for eastern Syria until 28 June); Brig. Gen. Rafiq Shahadeh (Chief of staff for eastern Syria from 28 June); Maj. Gen. Fuad Khaddour † (Syrian Army top commander); Turki Albu Hamad (Forces of the Fighters of the Tribes); Mohammad Hosseini "Salman" † (Hazrat-e Fatemeh Zahra Brigade intelligence chief)	(Syrian opposition) Tlas Salama (Lions of the East Army commander) (Syrian opposition) Lt. Col. Muhannad Tala (Revolutionary Commando Army commander)	Unknown

Units involved
Syrian Armed Forces; Syrian Army; 3rd Division; Qalamoun Shield Forces; 4th Division; 5th Division; 7th Division; 15th Special Forces Division; 5th Corps; National Defence Forces; Syrian Arab Air Force; (Syria) Syrian pro-government militias; Palestine Liberation Army; 413th Battalion; SSNP; Liwa al-Quds; Baqir Brigade; Forces of the Fighters of the Tribes; Saraya al-Areen; Jaafariyah Force; Sayyida al Raqqia Brigade; al-Mukhtar al-Thiqfi Brigade; PMF-affiliated Iraqi militias; Kata'ib al-Imam Ali; Kata'ib Hezbollah; Kata'ib Sayyid al-Shuhada; Liwa Abu al-Fadhal al-Abbas; Harakat Hezbollah al-Nujaba; LAAG; Harakat al-Abdal; Iraqi Liberation Movement; Force 313; Ansar Allah al Awfiya in Iraq and Syria; Jihad Companies; Liwa'a Zulfiqar; Liwa Fatemiyoun; Hazrat-e Fatemeh Zahra Brigade; Russian Armed Forces and affiliated units; Russian Aerospace Forces; Special operations forces; Russian Airborne Troops; 31st Guards Air Assault Brigade (allegedly); "Thorbrandr" (Scandinavian volunteers)	(Syrian opposition) Free Syrian Army; Southern Front; Lions of the East Army; Forces of Martyr Ahmad al-Abdo; Army of Free Tribes; Revolutionary Commando Army; Al-Qaratayn Martyrs Brigade	(Islamic State) Military of ISIL; Wilayat Homs

Strength
50,000 (pro-government claim): 3,000+	(Syrian opposition) Revolutionary Commando Army: "Hundreds" (United States) 150 US troops, 1 HIMARS	Unknown

The Syrian Desert campaign (May–July 2017) was a large-scale military operation of the Syrian Army that initially started along the highway from Damascus to the border with Iraq against rebel forces during the Syrian civil war. Its first intended goal was to capture both the highway and the al-Tanf border crossing, thus securing the Damascus countryside from a potential rebel attack. Later, multiple other fronts were opened as part of the operation throughout the desert, as well as operation "Grand Dawn" against ISIL with the aim of reopening the Damascus-Palmyra highway and preparing for an offensive towards Deir ez-Zor.

Since 2016, the United States and the United Kingdom has staffed and operated a training facility in al-Tanf (the "Al Tanf Garrison"), with their special operations troops advising a Syrian rebel group known as the Revolutionary Commando Army. The garrison was reinforced in May, and then expanded in June 2017, with more advanced US offensive weapons, including the HIMARS multiple rocket launchers. On a number of occasions, US forces struck advancing pro-government troops and militia in what US forces dubbed "self-defense strikes".

== Background ==
In the months prior to the offensive, the rebel Free Syrian Army (FSA) waged a campaign against the jihadist Islamic State of Iraq and the Levant (ISIL) in the desert border region known as the Badia, which ended with ISIL being fully expelled from the southern Syrian desert. This also brought the rebels closer to the southeastern countryside of Damascus and government-held territory.

== The offensive ==
=== Advance along the Baghdad–Damascus highway ===
On 7 May 2017, the Syrian Arab Army, led by the 5th Corps and Iranian-backed militias, launched an attack on the FSA in the Sabaa Biyar area of Homs province. By the following day, the SAA had advanced some 45 kilometers and captured several sites east of the Al-Seen Airbase in the advance, including: the Zaza Checkpoint, the Sabihiyah Mountains and the Sabaa Biyar area. The advance gave them fire control over this rural region.

The FSA began a counteroffensive on 9 May, with the intended goal of recapturing these areas as well as the large mountains overlooking the Baghdad-Damascus road. The commander of the Lions of the East Army, Tlas al-Salama, said that Syrian warplanes had struck rebel outposts near the Syrian-Jordanian border after which his group fired missiles towards Khalhala airport. At the end of the day, the rebels recaptured the Zaza checkpoint, but failed to re-enter the Sabaa Biyar area.

On 10 May, clashes renewed in the Zaza area and two days later the Army recaptured the Zaza checkpoint, as well as the Sabihiyah Mountains. In an attempt to counter the Army's advances, the rebels fired dozens of 'Grad' rockets on Army positions. In retaliation, the Syrian Air Force hit FSA convoys and their rearguard headquarters at the al-Tanf border crossing, and on 12 May Iraqi Shi'ite militias launched an offensive from the east to drive the militants from the desert region.

In the night between 14 and 15 May, pro-government reinforcements arrived in the area, including Iraqi Shiite militias. The reinforcements concentrated in the town of Biyar Al-Saba. More Army tanks, as well as surface-to-air missiles, were brought closer to the frontline. By this point, government forces were within 24 and 100 kilometers of al-Tanf. Meanwhile, US and British special forces had arrived at the border crossing to assist the rebels in their ongoing offensive towards ISIL-held Deir ez-Zor.

On 18 May, National Defense Forces, alongside the 5th and 7th Armored Divisions of the Syrian Army, advanced 35 kilometers into rebel-held areas in eastern As-Suwayda Governorate. Meanwhile, government forces were probing to determine how near they could get to al-Tanf and reached positions about 27 kilometers from the town, when the lead portion of their advancing convoy was hit by US-led Coalition air-strikes. According to a US defense official, before the strikes were conducted, government troops were warned they were getting too close to Coalition forces garrisoned in al-Tanf but did not respond. According to the US, four or five vehicles were destroyed, including a tank and two bulldozers. In contrast, the Syrian Army reported that two tanks were destroyed and a Shilka SPAAG was damaged. Eight soldiers were killed.

The next day, despite the US-led Coalition's air-strikes, pro-government forces captured the Zarqa junction near al-Tanf. The Army also sent more reinforcements to the highway. Meanwhile, the pro-government Iranian-backed militias advanced southwards from the government-held eastern Qalamoun area on the 19th, taking territory from US-backed rebels in the Badia.

=== Push along the Jordanian border ===
On 20 May, the Syrian Army, alongside their paramilitary allies, captured part of the eastern part of as-Suwayda province, namely the al-Zuluf area. The following day, government forces further advanced and captured several positions in the southern Syrian desert. In response to the government advances, FSA groups in the area launched an operation named "Badia Volcano" to fight the pro-government forces.

On 22 May, the Army captured the Al-Rahbeh area, 25 kilometers north of the Zuluf dam, with no direct clashes taking place, save for an artillery duel. Thus the Army was 30 kilometers from cutting off a large, sparsely populated, rebel-held area in the southeastern Damascus countryside. Also, during the last week, the Syrian Army managed to secure 70 kilometers of the Syrian–Jordanian border. Towards the end of the day, the Syrian Army reached positions six kilometers south of the newly captured Scientific Research Battalion, while other forces advanced east of the Zuluf Dam. These advances, brought the Army close to completely encircling and cutting off rebel forces in the southeastern part of Damascus governorate from their comrades in and around al-Tanf. The government forces appeared to use advanced Russian-made arms and were supported by Russian helicopters, a report acknowledged on 26 May by the Russian Defence ministry's media outlet.

=== Reopening of the Damascus–Palmyra highway ===
On 23 May, the Syrian Army opened a new 100-kilometer front against ISIL, with the intended aim to open the Damascus-Palmyra highway and to prevent the US-backed rebels from linking up with their allies in the Eastern Qalamoun mountains. Government forces swiftly captured over 1,200 square kilometers of territory, including numerous hills and villages from ISIL.

On 25 May, the Army captured half a dozen locations, paving the way for the reopening of the Damascus-Palmyra highway the following day.

=== Syrian Army reaches the Iraqi border ===
On 30 May, the Syrian Army, alongside the National Defense Forces and Iraqi paramilitary units, captured the Helba area in southeastern Homs province, thus coming within 50 km of the border with Iraq. The next day, FSA groups launched a counteroffensive called Operation This is Our Land and launched barrages of BM-21 Grad rockets at government forces. The rebels claimed to have broken through the first government lines of defense near the Zaza checkpoint. In response, the Syrian and Russian Air Forces conducted airstrikes against the rebels.

On 3 June, the Syrian Army captured several positions along the highway, six kilometers west of Arak. Three days later, the Army reported it had captured three areas from ISIL south of Palmyra, creating the conditions for a simultaneous push towards both the T3 pumping station and Arak.

Meanwhile, on 6 June, the Syrian Army captured the hilltop of Tal Al-Abd along with some adjacent points, thus putting them close to the Dawkah area, while the USAF had struck pro-government forces 25 miles from the US-UK training area at al-Tanf earlier in the day. The US forces stated the government forces were a threat to the US-backed fighters and allied troops based at the Coalition training area at al-Tanf. The next day, the Syrian government's allies threatened retaliatory strikes in the event of further US strikes on Syria's forces.

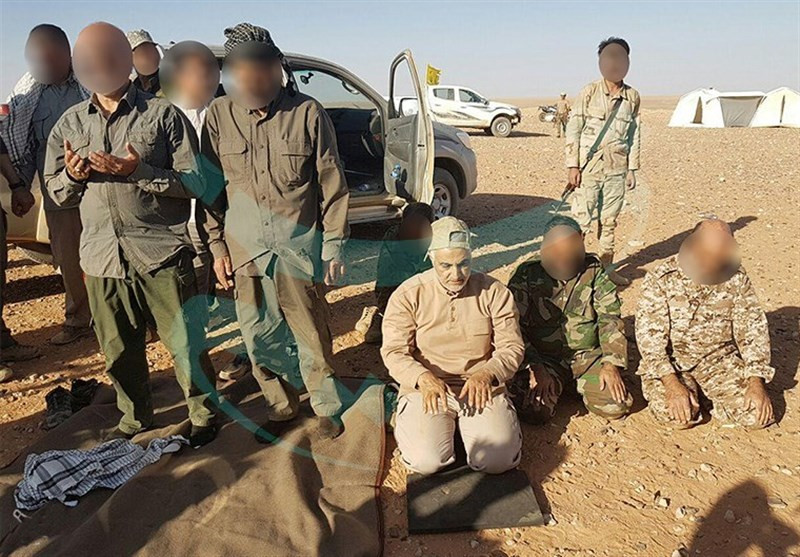
Major general Qasem Soleimani gives a prayer of thanks for the success of the offensive near the Iraqi border, together with Liwa Fatemiyoun fighters.

On 7 June, government forces seized several hills around Arak. Advances were also made southeast of Palmyra. On 8 June, the Syrian Army captured the Dakwah hilltop from the rebels and some hilltops and the Bir Abbasiyah area from ISIL. Meanwhile, during the same day, the USAF struck the Syrian Army operating near al-Tanf again, while the rebels showered SAA positions with Grad rockets.

On 9 June, government forces advanced eastwards and set up positions around 70 kilometers (43 miles) northeast of al-Tanf, thus reaching and securing a part of the Syrian–Iraqi border for the first time since 2015. The advance also cut off the US-backed forces from the Deir ez-Zor Governorate. On 11 June, five rebel fighters were killed by Jordanian forces, as they tried to return to Jordan. On 23 June, Syrian Army captured Ard Al-Washash, Al-Waer Dam, Al-Waer Canyon region and considerable desert areas, coming within 25 km from T2 pumping station. On 26 June Bi'r al-Duliayat area was captured by Syrian Army from ISIL rebel forces.

=== SAA advance towards al-Sukhnah and into Deir ez-Zor ===
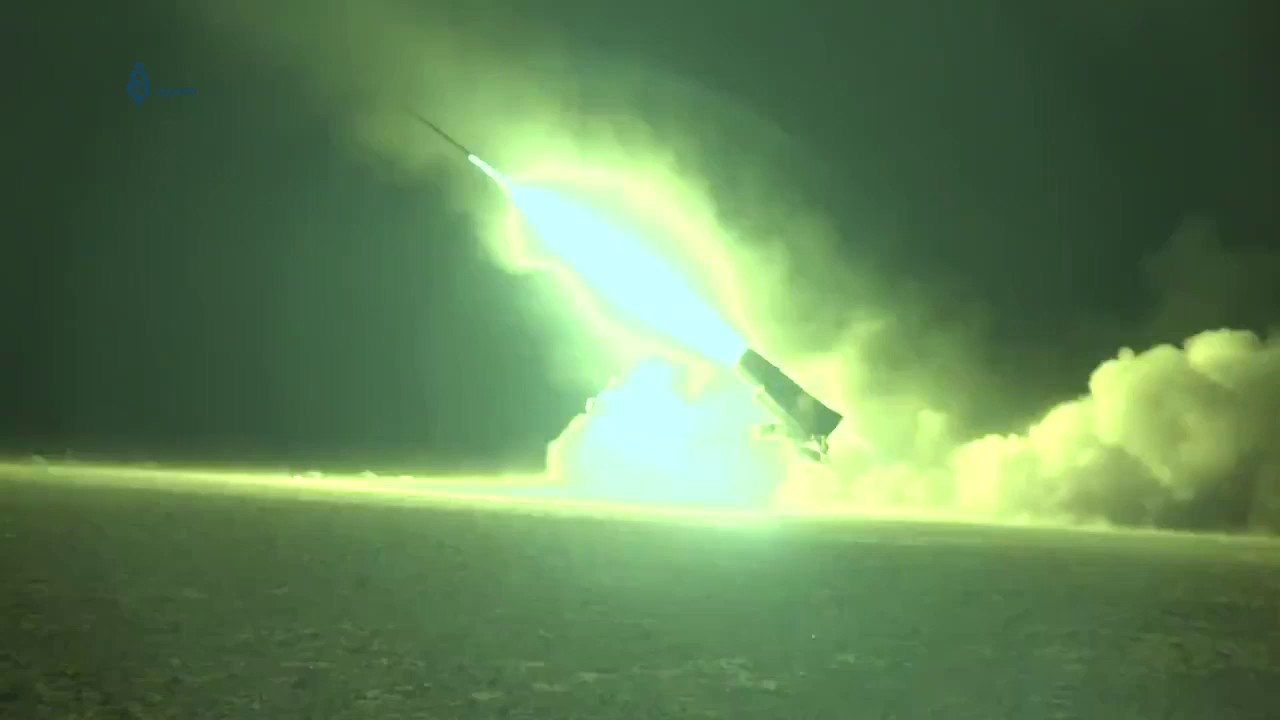
A Syrian rebel BM-21 Grad launcher launching rockets at Syrian Army forces in the Syrian Desert.

On 13 June, the Syrian Army captured the town of Arak and nearby Arak Gas Fields. Later on that day, almost the entire 103rd Brigade of the Republican Guard was deployed to the area from the Latakia Governorate, to participate in an upcoming large-scale offensive to break ISIL's siege of Deir ez-Zor city. The next day, the Syrian Army captured the Arak triangle, which includes the T3 pumping station, as well as the Talilah area.

On 18 June, the Syrian Army reportedly cut the road between ISIL-held towns of Al-Qaim to Al-Sukhnah, entered Deir ez-Zor Governorate from the south, while capturing large parts of the Syrian Desert from ISIL. Meanwhile, IRGC Aerospace Force bases in west Iran fired six surface-to-surface mid-range missiles targeting ISIL forces in the Deir ez-Zor Governorate. It was officially announced as a response to the terrorist attacks in Tehran earlier that month.

On 19 June, ISIL fighters reportedly stormed a military camp held by the Revolutionary Commando Army, resulting in the capture and subsequent execution of eight rebels. The next day, a USAF F-15E shot down a pro-government Shahed-129 UCAV as it approached the 55-kilometer exclusion zone surrounding the Coalition base at al-Tanf. On 21 June, the Syrian Army attacked the rebel-held Bir Qassab area, 75 km southeast of Damascus, eventually capturing it.

On 22 June, the Syrian Army reported it had come within 20 km of Al-Sukhnah. Two days later, pro-government forces seized the Arak Gas Station as they continued their push towards Deir ez-Zor.

On 26 June, government forces made significant advances toward Abu Kamal, and over the next two days captured more territory from ISIL in eastern Homs Governorate. ISIL resistance was heavy, however, and the government forces suffered numerous casualties, including Maj. Gen. Fuad Khaddour. Meanwhile, FSA groups continued to attack government outposts in the desert. During the first day of July, the Syrian Army pushed deeper into Syrian Desert, capturing two hills overlooking Hamimah.

On 6 July, after two days of fighting, pro-government forces advanced 10 km, coming within 15 km of Al-Sukhnah. Thirty-five ISIL jihadists and 22 pro-government fighters were killed during the clashes. On 9 July ISIL fighters overran hill of Al-Mashirfah near town of Jubb Al-Jarrah, stating that they killed 20 SAA soldiers. The next day Syrian Army pressed on towards Sukhnah, capturing most of al-Qalilat mountain chain northwest of al-Hail gas field, stating that they killed over 20 ISIL fighters.

On 11 July, the al-Hail gas field was captured by the Army.

=== SAA advances in as-Suwayda and Rif-Dimashq governorates ===
Despite an internationally agreed ceasefire, on 10 July Syrian government troops and Iranian-backed militias initiated the second phase of Operation Big Dawn, launching an assault upon eight rebel-held villages east of Khalkhalah airbase in a sparsely populated, mainly Druze desert area, capturing the hilltop of Tal al-Asfar alongside several smaller hills overlooking the village of Al-Asfar. The area was held by Jaysh Ahrar al Ashaer, a rebel group composed of tribal fighters operating in the border area with Jordan, and the rebels claimed the government assault included aerial bombing. Concurrently, another assault was launched on rebel positions in Suwayda and Rif-Dimashq governorates near al-Seen airbase. During the first day of the renewed push, government forces captured 3,000 square kilometers of territory from the rebels. Over the next several days, by 13 July, the Syrian Army and its allies captured an additional 200 km^{2}, coming within 20 km from completely encircling a large rebel-held mountainous semi-desert area straddling across eastern Suwayda and Rif-Dimashq governorates.

Following a short-lived ceasefire with the FSA in Syria's southwestern Badia region, brokered by Russia and the United States, government forces started redeploying to the east of Palmyra for a new offensive.

== Aftermath ==
Syrian Army gains in the South made from May to October 2017, right before the Central Syria campaign kicked off

On 1 August, the rebels announced a new offensive against the Syrian Arab Army in Syria's desert region. The rebels stated they would continue to fight government forces despite the rejection of US support for their battle. On 4 August, the Syrian Arab Army resumed their operations against the FSA, making advances near the Jordanian border. Government advances continued in As-Suwayda the next day. Late in August, rebel fighters assaulted Syrian Army border posts along the border with Jordan in As-Suwayda governorate, but were forced to fall back to Jordan after failing to break through the defenses.
