= Sabaa Biyar =

Town in central Syria

Al-Sabe' Biyar السبع بيار Saba'a Biar
- Town
- Location within Syria
- Coordinates: 33°46′47″N 37°41′1″E
- Country: Syria
- Governorate: Rif Dimashq
- District: Douma
- Subdistrict: Al-Sabe' Biyar

Population (2004)
  - Total: 395
- Time zone: UTC+3 (EET)
  - Summer (DST): UTC+2 (EEST)

Al-Sabe' Biyar, also spelled Saba'a Biar, or Sabaa Biyar (Arabic: السبع بيار) is a town in central Syria, administratively part of the Rif Dimashq Governorate, located northeast of Damascus. It is situated in the Syrian Desert, in the Syrian part of the Badia region, along the highway connecting Dumayr in the west to the al-Waleed border crossing with Iraq, with no other localities in its vicinity. It is the administrative center and only locality in the al-Sabe' Biyar nahiyah ("subdistrict"). According to the Syria Central Bureau of Statistics (CBS), al-Sabe' Biyar had a population of 395 in the 2004 census.

== History ==
In early May 2017, the town was reported to have been retaken by the Syrian government forces, shortly after the ISIL militants had pulled out of the area.
