= Syrian Border Security Force =

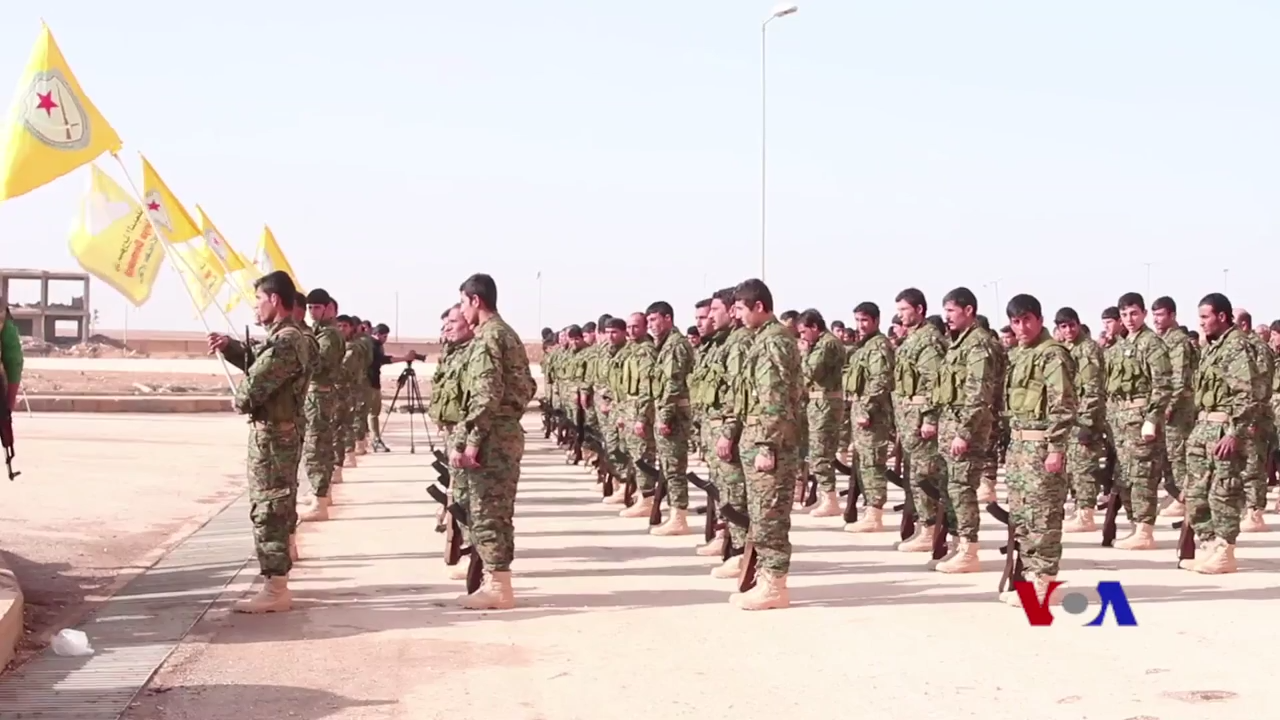
- Graduation of the second contingent of the Syrian Border Security Force, affiliated with both the Syrian Democratic Forces and the Self-Defence Forces, south of Hasaka on 20 January 2018. The unit consisted of around 250 fighters.
- Country: Syria
- Type: Border Security Force
- Role: Border security

The Syrian Border Security Force (SBSF) was a U.S.-trained border security force which was to deploy along Syria's borders with Turkey, Iraq and the Euphrates, with the strategic aim of containing remnants of the Islamic State of Iraq and the Levant (ISIL). The US state department had denied the implementation of any border security force by the US government referring to the new development simply as security training.

== Establishment ==
On 23 December 2017, U.S. Army General Joseph Votel, commander of CENTCOM, announced that U.S. forces in Syria were planning an expansion of their current training program for pro-Coalition militias to specialize in border security. The official reasoning for extending support of pro-Coalition Kurdish and Arab militias was preventing the resurgence of ISIL in newly cleared areas under the Syrian Democratic Forces (SDF) control.

On 31 December 2017, Kurdish Hawar News Agency reported that a "North Syrian Army" was in the process of being formed. The role of the new formation was said to be carrying out border security duties in areas under the control of the SDF. This new army was planned to be headed by the Self-Defense Forces (HXP), and composed of Arab, Kurdish, Assyrian, Turkmen and Chechen fighters. HXP leader, Siyabend Welat, stated that "the North Syrian Army will prove the will of people to defend themselves should they ever come under attack."

Officially announced on 13 January 2018, Combined Joint Task Force – Operation Inherent Resolve (CJTF-OIR) Public Affairs Officer Col. Thomas Veale told the Defense Post website that the force will consist of roughly 30,000 personnel, half of which are Syrian Democratic Forces veterans. The other 15,000 are currently being recruited, with about 230 people undergoing training in the Border Security Force (BSF)'s inaugural class. The Public Affairs Office further stated that Kurdish YPG units would serve in northern Syria, which would be a dividing line between the border of Turkey and Syrian National Army forces. Syrian Arabs will be deployed along the Euphrates River Valley and close to the border of Iraq to separate themselves from the Russian and Iranian-backed Syrian Armed Forces.

The spokesman added that the training of BSF troops would include instructions on interrogation, screening and biometric scanning as well as countering improvised explosive devices.

On 20 January 2018, around 250 fighters graduated as part of the second contingent of the BSF south of Hasaka. Fighters of the unit waved both SDF and HXP flags, and the graduation ceremony was attended by SDF officers and US military personnel.

== Reactions ==
The announced creation of the Border Security Force has been met with strong international criticism by Syria, Russia and Turkey.

Syria – The Syrian Foreign Ministry officially condemned the U.S. decision to create the new Border Security Force with 30,000 personnel in areas controlled by the Syrian Democratic Forces as being illegal. The statement further called the creation of this force as "blatant breach of Syria's sovereignty and territorial integrity and a flagrant violation of international law."

Syria's Foreign Ministry urged the UN to denounce the U.S.-led coalition's decision, and counter the "domination mentality and arrogance which dominate the U.S. administration's policies", saying that this action would lead to consequences for international security. The ministry's office warned that any Syrian citizen that fights on behalf of the U.S.-created border force will be guilty of high treason against the state and people of Syria, and that the person would stand trial as a traitor.

Russia – On 15 January, Vladimir Shamanov, Chairman of the Defense Committee of the State Duma announced Russia would have to take measures in response to the formation of the Border Security Force. Shamanov stated that "[such behavior by the U.S.-led coalition] stands in direct confrontation [with Russia's interests], and we and our colleagues will certainly undertake certain measures on stabilization of the situation in Syria."

Turkey – The plans of the coalition to create this border force has fueled Turkey's resentment over the coalition arming and supporting Kurdish militias in Syria. Turkey views the Syrian Kurdish PYD movement and their armed-wing, the YPG, as a national security threat. The YPG are dominant forces in the U.S.-backed Syrian Democratic Forces, and are allies of the PKK, a Kurdish organization designated as a terrorist group that wages an insurgency in southern Turkey.

The Border Security Force announcement immediately triggered a reaction from Ankara, with President Erdoğan's representative İbrahim Kalın, stating the move was unacceptable and worrying. He further mentioned that instead of ceasing the weapon supplies to SDF forces, "the USA is taking worrying steps to legitimize this organisation and make it lasting in the region." On 13 January, President Recep Tayyip Erdoğan said that the Turkish Armed Forces might launch a military operation in YPG-controlled areas of northern Syria, including the cities of Manbij and Afrin.

Earlier on 14 January, a Turkish senior official told Reuters that the U.S. training of the BSF was the real reason as to why the U.S. chargé d'affaires was summoned in Ankara on 10 January, as relations between the U.S. and Turkey are becoming strained due to U.S. military support for the YPG. By 15 January, President Erdoğan strongly condemned the formation of the Border Security Force. In his speech in Ankara, he criticized the U.S., stating that "a country we call an ally is insisting on forming a terror army on our borders," and said that Turkey will try to prevent the BSF from being formed.

Iran – Foreign Ministry spokesman Bahram Qasemi has stated that such a unit would raise tensions in Syria and is an obvious interference in the internal affairs of a country, while at the same time urging all 2,000 U.S. troops to leave Syria.

USA – Secretary of State Rex Tillerson eventually denied the US was involved in the creation of any border security force stating "that entire situation has been mis-portrayed, mis-described, some people misspoke. We are not creating a border security force at all."

== See also ==
- List of armed groups in the Syrian Civil War
