= Liwa Chemicals =

Oilfield services company based in UAE

Liwa Petroleum & Industrial Supplies
- Type: Private
- Industry: Oilfield services, Trading
- Founded: 1939
- Headquarters: Abu Dhabi, United Arab Emirates
- Areas served: Middle East
- Key people: Salah Salem Al-Shamsi (Chairman)
- Products: Mechanical equipment, Pumps, Tubes, Coatings, Catalysts, Lubricants
- Services: Oilfield equipment, Technical services, Chemicals, Maintenance, Consultation

Liwa Petroleum & Industrial Supplies is a trading company in the oil, gas and petrochemical sectors and focuses on specialized equipment and services, as well as representing international EPC contractors and pipeline providers in Abu Dhabi, where the company is headquartered.

== History ==
Liwa first began operating as a petroleum company in 1939. Due in part to the area's large petroleum sources, the company was able to grow locally. By the 1950s, Liwa had become one of the leading companies in the United Arab Emirates.

Liwa concentrated on the regional, Middle East petroleum market, however, which limited the company's international exposure.

Businessman Salah Salem Al-Shamsi opened Liwa Chem in the late 1990s, allowing Liwa to enter the chemicals industry. Throughout recent years, Liwa has transformed from a chemicals and petroleum company into a trader, supplier and service contractor for the oil and gas industry. The company partners with different organizations and companies for exploration and development, including Abu Dhabi National Oil Company (ADNOC).

In 2005, Liwa, along with American partner Occidental Petroleum, was able to win nine out of fifteen exploration areas in the EPSA-4 auction, making Liwa and Occidental among the first international petroleum companies to be allowed to operate in Libya after the lifting of the Libyan Embargo.

== Corporate structure ==
The company is led by Chairman Salah Salem Al-Shamsi.

== Operations ==
Liwa offers specialized equipment and services for the oil and gas industry. This includes various mechanical and technical products (like engines, tubes, pumps) as well as chemicals and lubricants (paints, coatings, catalysts). The company also fabricates individual equipment, and offers mechanical services like maintenance, plant shutdown and electrical services. Liwa also offers consultation and labour services.
