= Mávros Krínos =

Greek nationalist organization

Mávros Krínos (the black lily in Greek language) is a Greek national-revolutionary armed organization founded to support the Syrian regime of Bashar al-Assad against the Syrian Opposition and Sunni jihadists.

== History ==
Mávros Krínos was founded in 2013, the group is named after a website of the same name. During the Syrian Civil War, the group is active, along with other national revolutionaries from Europe in the war. Stavros Libovisis, from the editorial group of Mávros Krínos said in an interview "It is difficult to determine precisely the exact number of European fighters present, but lately thousands of Russians, Ukrainians and Poles have declared themselves ready to fight alongside the "Lion of Syria", that is, Bashar al-Assad. He also said that during the Battle of Qusayr, in which Mávros Krínos participated, passports were found on "the corpses of Obama's compatriots" (speaking of Sunni jihadists with American citizenship).

In Greece, the group's supporters are said to have carried out xenophobic actions against refugees.

== Ideology ==
Mávros Krínos is a national-revolutionary, radical greek nationalist tendency, with anti-NATO, anti-Zionist, anti-Islamist and anti-Immigration agenda.

The group is sometimes referred to as neo-Nazi, Strasserist or «anarcho-fascist» by some researchers.
