= Thorbrandr =

Nordic militant organization in the Syrian civil war

- Þorbrandr
- Leader: Norrmann
- Dates active: 7 May 2017 - ?
- Country: Norway; Syria
- Allegiance: Russia
- Active regions: Syria
- Ideology: Fascism
- Wars: Syrian civil war; Russian intervention in the Syrian civil war; Syrian Desert campaign (May–July 2017); Central Syria campaign

Thorbrandr (Norwegian: Þorbrandr) was a pro-Assad Nordic militant organization in the Syrian civil war.

== History ==
=== Foundation ===
The Thorbrandr was founded by a Norwegian citizen named "Norrmann", the militants come from Europe, specifically Norway, Sweden and Iceland.

=== Activities ===
The group had access to heavy weaponry, such as tanks. The group is against the Islamic State in Syria, the group is working in allegiance with Russia on its intervention, the group considers itself from far-right and fascist.
