= Harakat al-Abdal =

Iraqi militant group

- حركة الأبدال
- Other name: 39th Brigade
- Dates active: 2014 – present
- Country: Iraq
- Allegiance: Popular Mobilization Forces
- Headquarters: Baghdad
- Active regions: Iraq; Syria (Until 2024)
- Ideology: Shiism
- Part of: Axis of Resistance
- Wars: War in Iraq; Syrian civil war; Battle of Aleppo; Operation Dawn of Victory; Syrian Desert campaign (May–July 2017)

Harakat al-Abdal (Arabic: حركة الأبدال, romanized: Harakat al-Abdal, lit. 'The Replacements Movement') is a pro-Iranian Shia militant group in Iraq, affiliated with the Popular Mobilization Forces. The group fought in the Syrian civil war.

== History ==
=== Foundation ===
The group was founded in 2014, after the Islamic State invasion of Iraq, in southern Iraq to battle against the Islamic State, in addition to adopting the Velayat-e faqih.

=== Activities ===
On January 5, 2016, Liwa Assad Allah al-Ghalib fi al-Iraq wa al-Sham, a Shia militant group, announced that after negotiations, the group had joined within Harakat al-Abdal. The group has been announcing operations in Syria through the media. These operations took place in Aleppo in 2016, where a large number of Shiite militias participated in the efforts led by Qassem Soleimani to break the Siege of Nubl and al-Zahraa. The group participated in the Operation Dawn of Victory, along with other contingents of Iraqi militias. During the Syrian Desert campaign, the group launched several attacks towards Al-Tanf along with other Iraqi, Lebanese and Syrian militias such as Hezbollah. The group is part of the Popular Mobilization Forces such as the "39th Brigade".

=== Leadership ===
The leader of Harakat al-Abdal is Abu Akram al-Majidi, al-Majdi visited hospitals in Iran to check on the health of wounded fighters.
