= Liwa Assad Allah al-Ghalib fi al-Iraq wa al-Sham =

Shia militia operating in Iraq

Conquering Lion of God Forces of Iraq and the Levant
- Emblem of Liwa Assad Allah al-Ghalib
- Leaders: Secretary-General Sheikh Abdallah al-Shaibani (overall leader); Sayyid Abu Ghayth al-Hassani (leader of Kata'ib Assad Allah al-Ghalib) (Note: The current status of Kata'ib Assad Allah al-Ghalib as part of LAAG is unclear; the two groups have apparently distanced themselves from each other, and Sheikh Abdallah al-Shaibani has criticized Kata'ib Assad Allah al-Ghalib for using LAAG's name and logos.)
- Dates active: 2013 – present
- Groups: Kata'ib Assad Allah al-Ghalib (former Iraqi branch; current relation with LAAG unclear)
- Active regions: Syria (until 2024), Iraq
- Ideology: Vilayat-e Faqih; Anti-Americanism; Khomeinism; Muqtada al-Sadr Thought
- Part of: Liwa Abu al-Fadhal al-Abbas network (until mid-2017); Liwa Zulfiqar (since mid-2017)
- Wars: the Syrian Civil War and the War in Iraq (2013–2017)

The Conquering Lion of God Forces of Iraq and the Levant (Arabic: قوات أسد الله الغالب في العراق والشام, romanized: Quwwat Assad Allah al-Ghalib fi al-Iraq wa al-Sham), more commonly known by its original name (Arabic: لواء أسد الله الغالب في العراق والشام, romanized: Liwa Assad Allah al-Ghalib fi al-Iraq wa al-Sham) or simply LAAG, (Note: The militia's name has been alternatively transliterated as Liwa Asad Allah al-Ghalib fi al-Iraq wa al-Sham, or simply Assad Allah al-Ghalib.) is a Shia Muslim militant group operating throughout Iraq. It is named after the title of Imam Ali.

== History ==
Liwa Assad Allah al-Ghalib was originally set up in late 2013 as part of the Liwa Abu al-Fadhal al-Abbas network, ostensibly to work with other Shia militias to protect the Sayyidah Zaynab shrine, and was initially advised by Asa'ib Ahl al-Haq veterans. Although the group has Syrian members and has been considered to be one of the Syrian government's "domestic allies", LAAG primarily recruits Iraqi Shiites since its formation and has built an extensive recruitment network within Iraq.

Since mid-August 2013, LAAG began to actively fight for the Syrian government against various Syrian opposition groups. In this capacity, it originally operated almost exclusively in the Rif Dimashq Governorate, notably participating in the Rif Dimashq offensive (March–August 2013) and the Battle of Al-Malihah. This changed after June 2014, when ISIL conquered Mosul, as LAAG set up an Iraq branch, named "Kata'ib Assad Allah al-Ghalib" and led by Sayyid Abu Ghayth al- Hassani. Since then, however, strong differences have emerged between LAAG and Kata'ib Assad Allah al-Ghalib, with Sheikh Abdallah al-Shaibani claiming that the latter has illegitimately appropriated his group's name and branding, while Kata'ib Assad Allah al-Ghalib no longer claims to be part of LAAG. Despite that, LAAG still had an active Iraqi branch by early 2016. Another Iraqi militia partially influenced by LAAG is Jaysh al-Mu'ammal, whose founder Sa'ad Sawar had fought with LAAG in Syria before forming his own militant group in 2016.

In early 2015, LAAG, among other Shia militias, deployed forces to Latakia Governorate, when Sunni rebel forces threatened the local Alawite population. While LAAG returned to rural Rif Dimashq after this first northern foray, it became more active throughout Syria afterwards. In late 2015, LAAG sent fighters to Aleppo for the Aleppo offensive (October–December 2015), and in early 2016 it returned to the Syrian coastal highlands to participate in a local government offensive. At the same time, the group also began to provide advisors for the Desert Hawks Brigade, while adopting the latter's uniforms and insignia. Meanwhile, LAAG's Iraqi units had joined forces with Harakat al-Abdal, and developed close links with the Badr Organization and Kata'ib Sayyid al-Shuhada. LAAG still operated in the Damascus area as of March 2017. Later that month, LAAG was one of the Shia militias mobilized by the IRGC against a major rebel offensive in northern Hama. At Qamhana, Abdallah al-Shaibani's men helped to stop Tahrir al-Sham's attack, and thereafter aided the government counter-offensive.

By mid-2017, LAAG had come to be closely allied with another Shia Islamist militia, Liwa Zulfiqar, and even began to operate under the latter's name and logo. Around this time, Abdallah al-Shaibani's men took part in the Syrian Desert campaign (May–July 2017), during which they clashed with United States-supported Free Syrian Army groups near the al Waleed border crossing (al-Tanf).

== See also ==
- List of armed groups in the Syrian Civil War
- Liwa Abu al-Fadhal al-Abbas

== Bibliography ==
- AFPC (2017). The World Almanac of Islamism 2017. Lanham, Maryland; London; New York City: Rowman & Littlefield. ISBN 978-1442273443.
- Martin, Kevin W. (2018). "Syria and Iraq. ISIS and Other Actors in Historical Context". In Feisal al-Istrabadi; Sumit Ganguly (eds.). The Future of ISIS: Regional and International Implications. Washington, D.C.: Brookings Institution. pp. 89–118. ISBN 978-0815732167.
