= Liwa Zulfiqar =

Shia Islamist militant organization in Syria and Iraq

- لواء ذو الفقار
- Other name: Islamic Resistance Zulfiqar Brigade
- Leader: Abu Shahd Al-Jaburi
- Founded: 5 June 2013
- Dates active: 2013–present
- Split from: Liwa Abu al-Fadhal al-Abbas
- Groups: Homeland Shield Brigade; Liwa Assad Allah al-Ghalib fi al-Iraq wa al-Sham
- Headquarters: Syria
- Active regions: Ba'athist Syria (until 2024); Iraq
- Ideology: Shi'ism
- Status: Active
- Part of: Popular Mobilization Forces; 4th Armoured Division (Syria); Alawite Anger Division
- Wars: Syrian civil war; Al-Tanf offensive; Qalamoun offensive (2017); 2018 Southern Syria offensive; War in Iraq (2013–2017)

Liwa Zulfiqar (Arabic: لواء ذو الفقار, romanized: liwa' Zhulfeqa'ar, lit. 'the Zulfiqar Brigade') , sometimes misspelled as Liwa Dhulfiqar (Arabic: لواء دو الفقار, romanized: liwa' Dhulfeqa'ar, lit. 'the Dhulfiqar Brigade'), is a Shia Islamist militant group in Iraq and formerly Syria. It is named after the sword of Ali, Zulfikar.

== History ==
It was founded on June 5, 2013, the same day that Hezbollah declared victory in the Second Battle of al-Qusayr, claiming that the group is "in charge of protecting religious shrines, especially the Saydah Zaynab shrine". Most of the fighters come from Liwa Abu al-Fadhal al-Abbas, its leaders, Abu-Shahd and Abu-Hajir, are members of Liwa Abu al-Fadhal al-Abbas.

It collaborates with other militias in Syria such as Liwa Abu al-Fadhal al-Abbas and Liwa al-Imam al-Hussein, just as it shares many leaders and fighters with Liwa Abu al-Fadhal al-Abbas.

Abu Shahd Al-Jaburi while delivering food, supplies and medicine in Daraa Governorate, was stormed by Jaysh al-Hur, a rebel group, where clashes broke out, where the forces of Jaysh al-Hur, overwhelmed the forces of Liwa Zulfiqar, although the media considered him dead.

Iraqi militias formed the "Alawite Anger Division" that the militias that comprise it are Liwa al-Imam al-Hussein and Liwa Zulfiqar, with 7,000 militants.

The group published images of its mercenaries on the Syrian-Iraqi border. The Liwa Assad Allah al-Ghalib fi al-Iraq wa al-Sham militia joined Liwa Zulfiqar.

During Qalamoun offensive (2017), carried out massacres in Al-Nabek, as a person kidnapped by the group, Munir Abdul-Hay, along with 35 other people killed.

The militia published photos of fighters participating in 2018 Southern Syria offensive from Busra al-Harir, entitled "Islamic Resistance Liwa Zulfiqar from the Heart of Busra al Harir".

The group published images of Abu Shahd Al-Jaburi with Ghiath Dalla in an operating room from 4th Division in Saida.
