= Liwa Abu al-Fadhal al-Abbas =

Shia Syrian militia

Liwa Abu al-Fadhal al-Abbas لواء أبو الفضل العباس
- Logo Former shoulder sleeve insignia Ceremonial flag Flag used by the group
- Leaders: Abu Ajeeb (Secretary General); Abu Hajar (Brigade Commander) (WIA)
- Dates active: 2012–2024
- Split to: Liwa Zainabiyoun; Liwa Fatemiyoun
- Group: Liwa Assad Allah al-Ghalib fi al-Iraq wa al-Sham (until 2017)
- Headquarters: Damascus (until 2024)
- Active regions: Syria (until 2024): Rif Dimashq Governorate (until 2024); Aleppo Governorate (until 2024)
- Ideology: Shia Islamism; Anti-Zionism
- Size: 10,000+
- Part of: Axis of Resistance (until 2024)
- Wars: the Iraqi insurgency and Syrian civil war

The Brigade of Abu al-Fadl al-Abbas (Arabic: لواء أبو الفضل العباس, romanized: Liwa Abu al-Fadl al-Abbas), also known as the Kata'ib al-Abbas (Arabic: كتائب العباس, lit. ''al-Abbas Brigade''), was a Syrian Twelver Shia Muslim militia that fought for Ba'athist Syria prior to the collapse of the Assad regime. It is named after the nickname of Al-Abbas ibn Ali, son of Imam Ali.

The group was formed in late 2012 to defend the Sayyidah Zaynab Mosque and other Shia holy sites in Syria. It rose in prominence in reaction to the desecration of various shrines, heritage sites, and places of worship by Syrian rebels during the Syrian civil war, and subsequently collaborated with the Syrian Army. Its fighters include Shia Damascenes, Damascus-based Shia Iraqi refugees, and foreign Shia volunteers, mostly from Iraq. It fought primarily around Damascus, but has fought in Aleppo as well.

In May and June 2013, Reuters reported a split had developed within the brigade over finances and leadership which led to violence. Many non-Syrian members subsequently formed a different brigade.

On 19 May 2014, fighters from the Nour al-Din al-Zanki Brigade claimed to have taken over the al-Abbas Brigade's regional headquarters in Aleppo.

As the Islamic State in Iraq and the Levant made significant gains in Iraq in mid-2014, many of its Iraqi members returned home to defend the faltering government in Baghdad.

Liwa Assad Allah al-Ghalib fi al-Iraq wa al-Sham was part of Liwa Abu al-Fadhal al-Abbas until 2017, when it became a part of Liwa'a Zulfiqar.

The al-Abbas Brigade took part in the 2018 Southern Syria offensive in support of government troops.

The group was dissolved after the 2024 Syrian opposition offensives and the Fall of the Assad regime.

== See also ==
- List of armed groups in the Syrian Civil War
- Quwat Abu al-Fadhal al-Abbas
- Holy Shrine Defender
- List of military units named after people
