= Ali Reza Tavassoli =

Afghan Shia militant (1962–2015)

- علیرضا توسلی
- Born: 23 September 1962; Noorak, Hisa-i-Awali Bihsud, Behsud, Maidan Wardak, Kingdom of Afghanistan
- Died: 28 February 2015 (aged 52); Tal Gharin, Daraa Governorate, Syria
- Burial place: Mashhad, Iran
- Education: Al-Mustafa International University
- Military career
- Allegiance: Islamic Republic of Iran
- Branch: Abuzar Brigade; Liwa Fatemiyoun
- Service years: 1980s–2015
- Rank: Commander-in-Chief
- Nickname: Abu Hamed
- Engagements: Iran–Iraq War; Afghan Civil War (1996–2001); 2006 Lebanon war; Syrian Civil War; Battle of Aleppo (2012–2016); 2015 Southern Syria offensive †

Ali Reza Tavassoli (Persian: علیرضا توسلی; 23 September 1962 – 28 February 2015) was an Afghan militant of the Fatemiyoun Brigade. An ethnic Hazara, he was born in Afghanistan and later moved to Iran, where he studied at Al-Mustafa International University. His first activities as a combatant were during the Iran–Iraq War, when he and many other Afghan Shia Muslims enlisted in a volunteer pro-Iranian militia to fight against Iraq. He had later fought in the Afghan Civil War (1996–2001) and also the 2006 Lebanon War. Following the Arab Spring in 2011, Tavassoli was appointed by Iran's Islamic Revolutionary Guard Corps (IRGC) to command Afghan Shia militants in the Syrian Civil War. Four years later, while fighting alongside the IRGC, Hezbollah, and the Syrian government in the Southern Syria offensive, he was killed by Jabhat al-Nusra.

== Biography ==
=== Origins and early life ===
Ali Reza Tavassoli was born on 1 Mehr 1341 (equivalent to 23 September 1962) in Afghanistan. Biographical accounts place his birth in the village of Noorak, in the Behsud region of Maidan Wardak Province. Of Hazara ethnicity, he was the son of a rural family. His father, Mohammad Hossein Tavassoli, known as Haji Akhund, was a Shia cleric and local community figure.

Tavassoli lost his father at the age of seven and his mother two years later. One of his brothers is said to have died during the events of 1978–1979, in the context of political repression in Afghanistan. These family accounts, however, come from biographical and memorial sources, not from independent documentation.

=== Migration to Iran and education ===
In 1984, Tavassoli migrated to Iran. He settled in Mashhad and later studied at the Islamic seminaries of Isfahan and Qom, where he pursued religious sciences. To support himself during his studies, he worked as a construction labourer.

Some sources mention that he also studied at Al-Mustafa International University.

=== Personal life ===
Tavassoli married Ommolbanin Hosseini around 2001. The couple had three children: Fatima, Hamed, and Tuba. The family lived in Mashhad, in a neighbourhood with a large Afghan immigrant presence.

His wife's memories were collected in the book Khatun va Qomandan ("The Lady and the Commander"), published in 2020 and written by Maryam Orbanzadeh based on extensive interviews with Hosseini. The work received a note of praise from Iran's Supreme Leader, Ayatollah Ali Khamenei, who described Tavassoli as a "devoted martyr" and his wife as "patient and wise".

== Career ==
He served as a Shia volunteer fighter on the Iranian side of the Iran–Iraq War.

According to the "official" Iranian version, Ali Reza Tavassoli, alias Abu Hamed, and the Iranian cleric Mohammad Baqir Alaoui, initially asked Iran to send their small contingent of 22-25 Afghans stationed in Mashhad to Syria. This first contingent is said to have fought alongside the Shia Iraqi militia Kataib Sayyid al-Shuhada , which was created in Syria in the summer of 2013 and then deployed in Iraq and Syria, alongside Lebanese Hezbollah. Tavassoli then recruited from the Afghan Hazara community who had taken refuge in Iran and then from the small community present in Damascus around the tomb of Sayyida Zaynab (fewer than 2,000 people). Two other groups of 15 and then 22 volunteers had also arrived in Syria.

Ali Reza Tavassoli, the founder of Liwa Fatemiyoun, was a veteran of the Abouzar Brigade, already composed of Hazaras, which fought in Iranian Kurdistan against Iraqis and Kurdish separatists during the Iran-Iraq War, from its base which was in Ramadan.

Later, he volunteered to fight in the Afghan Civil War (1996–2001) against the Taliban. He had also fought in also the 2006 Lebanon War against Israel.

During the Syrian Civil War, Tavassoli was appointed by Qasem Soleimani, the erstwhile Iranian commander of the Quds Force, as a commander of Shia volunteer fighters from Afghanistan, Iraq, Pakistan, Lebanon, Syria, and Yemen. In 2014, he organized Afghan Shia volunteers and formed the Fatemiyoun Brigade to protect Shia shrines in Syria, where he was known by the Arabic-language nickname Abu Hamed.

== Death ==
On 28 February 2015, Tavassoli was killed during the Southern Syria offensive while fighting Jabhat al-Nusra in Daraa, south of Damascus. He is buried in Mashhad, Iran.

== See also ==
- Saqib Haider Karbalai
- Tawhid Ibrahim Begli
