= Saqib Haider Karbalai =

Former Shia Pakistani militant commander (1993-2017)

- ثاقب حیدر کربلائی
- Born: Saqib Haider; 1993; Borki village, Kurram district, Khyber Pakhtunkhwa, Pakistan
- Disappeared: 4 April 2017; Hama governorate, Syria
- Died: 5 April 2017 (aged 23–24); Tal Turabi area, Hama governorate, Syria
- Cause of death: Killed during a military offensive in Syria by the Islamic State
- Burial place: Bihshat-e-Masooma Martyrs Graveyard, Qom, Iran
- Spouse: Unnamed cousin
- Children: Taskin Zainab (daughter)
- Military career
- Allegiance: Islamic Republic of Iran (IRGC)
- Service years: 2010–2017
- Rank: Commander-In-Chief
- Nickname: Haj Haider
- Units: Tehreek-e-Jafaria Pakistan; Sipah-e-Muhammad Pakistan (2009–2010); Liwa Abu al-Fadhal al-Abbas (2012–2013); Liwa Fatemiyoun (2013–2014); Liwa Zainebiyoun (2014–2017)
- Commands: Sipah-e-Muhammad Pakistan (Senior Commander); Liwa Zainebiyoun (Commander-in-chief, Founder)
- Known for: Known for being the founder and first commander-in-chief of Liwa Zainebiyoun
- Conflicts: Sectarian violence in Pakistan; 2007 Kurram Agency conflict; Syrian Civil War; Battle of Aleppo (2012–2016); Aleppo offensive (October–November 2016); Aleppo offensive (November–December 2016); Siege of Deir ez-Zor (2014–2017); Palmyra offensive (2017); Hama offensive (March–April 2017) †

Saqib Haider Karbalai (Urdu: ثاقب حیدر کربلائی, romanized: Saaqb Haydar Karbali, Persian: ثاقب حیدر کربلایی, romanized: Saqhab Heydar Karbolayi, Arabic: ثاقب حيدر الكربلائي, romanized: Saqab Haydar al-Karbilayiy), also known by the Arabic-language nickname 'Haj Haider' (Arabic: الحاج حيدر, romanized: al-Haju Haydar) in Syria, was a religious Shia Pakistani Pashtun militant from Parachinar.

He had served as a senior member in Sipah-e-Muhammad Pakistan, the armed wing of the Shia Islamist religio-political organization; Tehreek-e-Jafaria Pakistan. He was the founder of the Zaianbiyoun brigade, a Shia Pakistani militia which had fought in the Syrian civil war.

== Early life ==
Saqib Haider, whose Jihadi name was "Karbalai", was born in the Borki village near the city of Parachinar in the Kurram district of Khyber Pakhtunkhwa, Pakistan in 1993. He was born into a religious Twelver Shia Muslim family and because of the religious environment of Parachinar, he used to participate actively in religious gatherings and activities with his father from childhood.

He was well known for his anti-America and anti-zionist views and speeches in his hometown. He had strong ties with the Islamic Republic of Iran and was a strong supporter of Wilayat al Faqih, including Khomeinism.

An IRGC-affiliated source's claimed that the Haj Haider went Iran, Iraq and Syria multiple times for Ziyarat of Shia holy sites in 2000s, where he met many IRGC officers and had established close ties with them by the beginning of the Syrian civil war.

Haider had also tried to peruse a life and a job as a taxi driver in the UAE, before quitting and going to Syria.

== Role in the Sectarian violence in Pakistan ==
The initial core of Liwa Zainebiyoun constituted of former members and fighters of Tehreek-e-Jafaria Pakistan and Sipah-e-Muhammad Pakistan, the former being a Shia Islamist political party and the ladder being a Shia Islamist armed organization in Pakistan, both of which fought in the Sectarian violence in Pakistan, against the Anti-Shia sectarian leadership of the banned terrorist groups Sipah-e-Sahaba and Lashkar-e-Jhangvi.

Both of these groups had strong presence in Shia communities of Pakistan and were headquartered in Thokar Niaz Beg, the Shia majority town of Lahore, where they ran a "virtual state within a state" in the 1990s until the collapse of their presence there by 2007 or 2010.

During this time, Haider had served as both a commander in Tehreek-e-Jafaria Pakistan and Sipah-e-Muhammad Pakistan. According to some sources, Haider got involved in the sectarian violence when he was only 13 year's old. He had joined just as tensions grew between the Shiites and Sunnis due to the increased presence of militants and insurgents affiliated with the Taliban, Al-Qaeda, and Haqqani network in his hometown in Kurram disrtrict. He was involved in Kurram's sectarian violence throughout his much of his life. Some sources claimed that the Haider also fought directly against Pakistani Taliban, Sipah-e-Sahaba and Lashkar-e-Jhangvi based Anti-Shia extremists in the Kurram Agency War of 2007 where he commanded local Shia Turi Tribal fighters and killed many local extremists.

== Service in Syria ==
Later around 2012 and 2013 the former members of Tehreek-e-Jafaria Pakistan and Sipah-e-Muhammad Pakistan (including Haider) left Pakistan for Syria in order to protect the shrine of Zaynab bint Ali in Sayyidah Zaynab, South of Damascus which was under threat of ISIL, Al-Qaeda and other extremist Sunni Islamist-Salafi Jihadist Anti-Shia Syrian Rebel groups. They joined and fought initially as part of the Shia Syrian Abu al-Fadhal al-Abbas brigade and later the Shia Afghan Fatemiyoun Brigade during the early years of the Syrian civil war, before forming the Zainebiyoun Brigade as a Shia Pakistani volunteer group, which was formed soon after the Fatemiyoun Brigade under the orders of IRGC's Quds Force.

Following the Arab Spring in 2011, Haider was tasked by Iran's Islamic Revolutionary Guard Corps (IRGC) to command Shia Pakistanis in the Syrian Civil War against ISIL. Originally around 2012 or 2013, under the command of Haider, Pakistani Shias fought as part of the Shia Syrian Abu al-Fadhal al-Abbas brigade and later as part of the Shia Afghan Fatemiyoun brigade during the early years of the Syrian civil war.

Later in 2014 he founded Zainebiyoun Brigade, with the help of Qasem Soleimani, as a Shia Pakistani volunteer group and IRGC appointed him as a Commander-In-Chief of the brigade.

The IRGC appointed Haider and Shia Afghan Ali Reza Tavassoli as Chief Commanders of the Zainebiyoun and Fatemiyoun brigades respectively, mainly appointed by Qasem Soleimani, the erstwhile Iranian commander of the IRGC's Quds Force. Both Haider and Reza became the commanders of Shia volunteer fighters from Pakistan and Afghanistan respectively, with training and funding from Iran to defend the Shia holy shrines from ISIL and it's subgroups in Syria and to a lesser extent, Iraq. They both served as the commanders of their respective Brigades until their deaths.

== Disappearance, death, and burial ==
In 2017, Saqib Haider Karbalai went missing while fighting alongside Syrian government forces during the Hama offensive (March–April 2017). The IRGC-affiliated Tasnim News Agency reported his death in 2019, claiming that the body of Haider was transferred to Tehran two years after he was killed in the Syrian city of Hama by ISIS terrorists.

According to Tasnim News Agency, the identity of the commander of the Zainabiyoun Brigade was identified after a DNA test, and he was transferred to Tehran where he was to be buried. The news agency also reported that "his body has no head and no arms" and that he was killed in action in April 2017 in the Tal Turabi area in the Hama Governorate, during the offensive while fighting ISIL.

== See also ==
- Ali Reza Tavassoli
- Tawhid Ibrahim Begli
