= Hamza Division =

Hamza Division may refer to:

- Hamza Division (Aleppo)
- Hamza Division (Daraa)
