= Liwa Fatemiyoun =

Shia Afghan militia

- لواء الفاطميون
- Founding leader: Ali Reza Tavassoli ("Abu Hamed Ali Shah Sakis") †; Sayyed Hakim †
- Leaders: Hussain Fedayee ("Zulfiqar") †; Hossein Fedai Abdarchi †; Reza Khavari †; Sayyed Ibrahim †; Muhammad Hosseini ("Salman") †; Anwar Yawari †
- Dates active: November 2014 – present
- Split from: Liwa Abu Fadl al-Abbas
- Split to: Liwa Zainebiyoun
- Allegiance: Iran; IRGC
- Groups: Hazrat-e-Abo Fazl Brigade; Hazrat-e-Fatemah Zahra Brigade
- Headquarters: Mashhad, Iran
- Active regions: Syria (2013–2024); Iraq (2024–2025); Yemen (2014–present)
- Ideology: Shia Islamism; Khomeinism
- Status: Active
- Size: c. 15,000 – 20,000 (2015) c. 12,000 – 14,000 (2017) c. 10,000 – 20,000 (2018) c. 500 – 1,500 (2020) c. 5,000 – 10,000 (2024)
- Part of: Islamic Revolutionary Guard Corps; Axis of Resistance
- Wars: Syrian civil war; Battle of Aleppo (2012–2016); Aleppo offensive (July 2015); Aleppo offensive (October–December 2015); Aleppo offensive (June–July 2016); Aleppo offensive (July–August 2016); Aleppo offensive (August–September 2016); Aleppo offensive (September–October 2016); Aleppo offensive (October–November 2016); Aleppo offensive (November–December 2016); Siege of Eastern Ghouta; Battle of Al-Malihah; 2015 Southern Syria offensive; Northwestern Syria offensive (April–June 2015); Al-Ghab offensive (July–August 2015); Northwestern Syria offensive (October 2015); Palmyra offensive (March 2016); Palmyra offensive (December 2016); 2017 Hama offensive; Syrian Desert campaign (May–July 2017); 2017 Central Syria campaign; Eastern Syria campaign (September–December 2017); Battle of Deir ez-Zor (September–November 2017); 2017 Abu Kamal offensive; Battle of Khasham; Rif Dimashq offensive (February–April 2018); 2018 Southern Syria offensive; Northwestern Syria offensive (December 2019–March 2020); Syrian Desert campaign (2017 – 2024); Northwestern Syria clashes (December 2022–November 2024); Deir ez-Zor offensive (2024); Yemeni Civil War; Sistan and Baluchestan insurgency; Iran–Israel proxy conflict

Liwa Fatemiyoun (Arabic: لِوَاء الْفَاطِمِيُّون, romanized: Liwā’ al-Fāṭimīyūn, lit. 'Fatimid Banner'; Dari: لواء فاطمیون), also known as Lashkar-e-Fatemiyoun (Arabic: فرقة فاطميون, romanized: Firqat al-Fāṭimīyūn; Dari: لشکر فاطمیون), Fatemiyoun Brigade, or Fatemiyoun Division, is a primarily Shia Hazara militia. It formed in 2013 to fight in Syria during the Syrian civil war on the side of the Syrian government prior to the collapse of the Assad regime. The group's officially designated purpose was the defence of the shrine of Zaynab bint Ali, and to fight "takfiri terrorists" in Syria, which would come to include the Islamic State (IS). It is funded, trained, and equipped by the Islamic Revolutionary Guard Corps (IRGC), and fights under the command of Iranian officers. Both the Fatemiyoun Brigade and the Iranian government downplay their relationship with one another, despite clear coordination and the brigade's operation under the auspices of the IRGC. Liwa Fatemiyoun is also closely associated with Hezbollah Afghanistan. It is primarily made-up of migrants from Afghanistan's historically persecuted Hazara minority living in Iran.

By late 2017, the unit was presumed to have numbered between 10,000 and 20,000 fighters. According to Zohair Mojahed, a cultural official in the Fatemiyoun Brigade, the group suffered 2,000 killed and 8,000 wounded up to the end of 2017 while fighting in Syria. A minimum of 925 deaths among the brigade's troops were documented based on monitoring of open source coverage of funeral services, but these burials do not take into account the bodies abandoned on the ground, executed prisoners, the missing, etc. It was reported in 2019 that as many as 50,000 Afghans in total had fought in Liwa Fatemiyoun, up until then.

== History ==
=== Background ===
The flag of Liwa Fatemiyoun

The main core of Liwa Fatemiyoun was constituted of former fighters of Shia Hazara militia groups like the Muhammad Army (Sepah-e-Muhammad), Tehran Eight, Hezbollah Afghanistan and Hezb-e-Wahadat. These factions were originally active in the late 1970s against the Khalqist government of Nur Muhammad Taraki and Hafizullah Amin whom began persecution of Hazaras. These groups participated in the Soviet Afghan War fighting against the Communist Afghan government and Soviet forces. Following the Soviet withdrawal, they continued to participate in the subsequent Afghan Civil Wars (1989–1992 and 1992–1996) against the Homeland Party regime of Muhammad Najibullah and rival factions, and later resisted against the Taliban during the Afghan Civil War (1996-2001). They would continue to resist until the collapse of the Taliban after the U.S Invasion of Afghanistan from which point onward some of them became part of the Afghan Army and fought against the Taliban insurgency during the War in Afghanistan (2001–2021) while others fled to Iran. Along with those, the initial core of fighters also consisted of former fighters of the Abuzar Brigade, a Shia militia which voluntarily fought in the Iran–Iraq War on the side of Iran. During the Iran–Iraq War, fighters of the Abuzar Brigade were stationed in the mountainous areas of Northwestern Iran, as they had experience in mountain and irregular warfare from their war with the Soviets.

Iran is known to have established branches of Hezbollah in Afghanistan and Pakistan, with several pro-Iranian groups operating in both countries during the Soviet–Afghanistan War.

=== Operations of Liwa Fatemiyoun ===
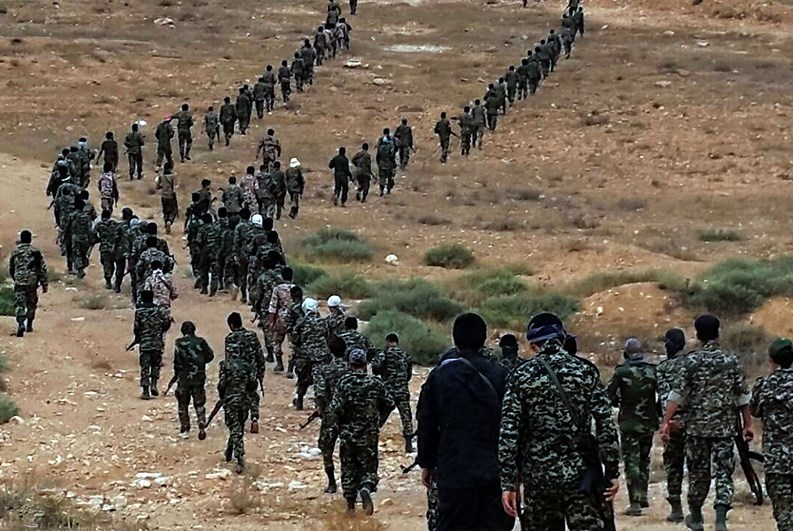
Liwa Fatemiyoun fighters during the Palmyra offensive in December 2016

Reports of pro-government Afghan fighters in Syria dated back to October 2012.

When the Syrian civil war had started, Fatemiyoun's founding commander, Ali Reza Tavassoli, known by his Nnom de guerre as Abu Hamed, and senior cleric Mohammad Baqir Alaoui Alawi requested to the Iranian government for Hamed's contingent of 22 to 25 fighters, who were based around the city of Mashhad, be allowed to go to Syria to defend the shrine of Sayyeda Zainab. The request was quickly approved in Tehran under the name of the 'Fatemiyoun'.

They originally fought in the Iraqi Abu Fadl al-Abbas Brigade before eventually becoming a distinct brigade in 2013. According to news sources affiliated with the IRGC, the group was founded on 12 May 2013.

The group's officially designated purpose, according to the Iranian government and affiliated news sources, is the defense of the shrine of Zaynab bint Ali (the granddaughter of the Islamic Prophet Muhammad), and to fight "takfiri terrorists" in Syria, which would come to include the Islamic State (IS) and the Al-Nusra Front.

At some point before 2014, Liwa Fatemiyoun was "incorporated" with Hezbollah Afghanistan, a minor political party in Afghanistan.

In terms of numbers, the first group of 22 Afghan volunteers reportedly arrived in Syria at the end of 2012. A second group of 15 followed, then a third group of 22. This first contingent would have fought alongside the Shia Iraqi Master of Martyrs battalion (Kata'ib Sayyid ush-Shuhada), and then deployed to Iraq in parallel with Syria, and also with Lebanese Hezbollah. The fifth contingent already included around 100 recruits. Liwa Fatemiyoun grew from the size of a brigade (called Liwa in Arabic) to that of a division (called Lashkar in Farsi/Persian) in 2015, which implied a strength of at least 10,000 fighters, but not all of whom were deployed in Syria. The range of 4,000 to 8,000 men due with regular rotation of personnel between Iran and Syria seemed more plausible. According to this account, the Afghans generally operated in units of 450 men (roughly the equivalent of a battalion), which seems plausible given what was seen among other actors on the Syrian regime side. This unit format also allowed them to be deployed to several locations in Syria simultaneously.

During the successful Battle of Al-Malihah in 2014, 50 Afghans had been killed in action during the fighting.

A Hazara Liwa Fatemiyoun sniper wearing the group's iconic yellow headband with the Shia paramilitary slogan "كلنا عباسك يا زينب" dedicated to Sayyidah Zaynab.

The Liwa Fatemiyoun became involved in multiple operations throughout Syria, including in Darra, Aleppo, and Palmyra. In March 2016, they fought in the recapture of Palmyra from the Islamic State. During the Aleppo offensive (July–August 2016), a commander of the Fatemiyoun brigade was killed. In 2017, the unit helped countering a major rebel offensive in northern Hama Governorate, and later aided a pro-government offensive in the Syrian Desert that aimed at reaching the Iraqi border. In course of the latter campaign, Mohammad Hosseini (also known as "Salman") was killed as he stepped on an anti-personnel mine. Hosseini had served as the intelligence chief of Liwa Fatemiyoun's Hazrat-e-Fatemeh Zahra Brigade. Following the successful conclusion of this offensive, the Liwa Fatemiyoun took part in the campaign to capture all of central Syria from the IS. Anwar Yawri, another commander of Liwa Fatemiyoun, was killed during these operations. The unit later took part in the Eastern Syria campaign (September–December 2017), and helped to break the Islamic State's siege on Deir ez-Zor.

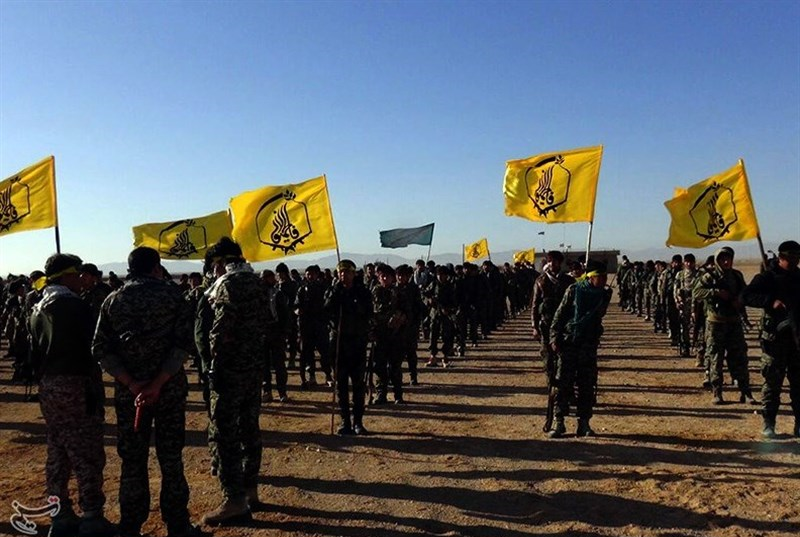
Liwa Fatemiyoun fighters during the Palmyra offensive (December 2016), showcasing their flag

Many of the group's commanders were veterans of previous Afghan conflicts, including: Sayyed Hakim, Hossein Fadaei Abdarchaya, Reza Khavari, and Seyyed Ibrahim. Hakim, killed in Syria in 2016, and was the last veteran of the Abuzar Brigade. After Ali Reza Tavassoli and his deputy Reza Bakhshi were killed in action in early 2015, much of Liwa Fatemiyoun's command structure was taken over by the IRGC's Quds Force. As of July 2018, at least 18 Quds Force officers have died in Syria alongside Liwa Fatemiyoun.

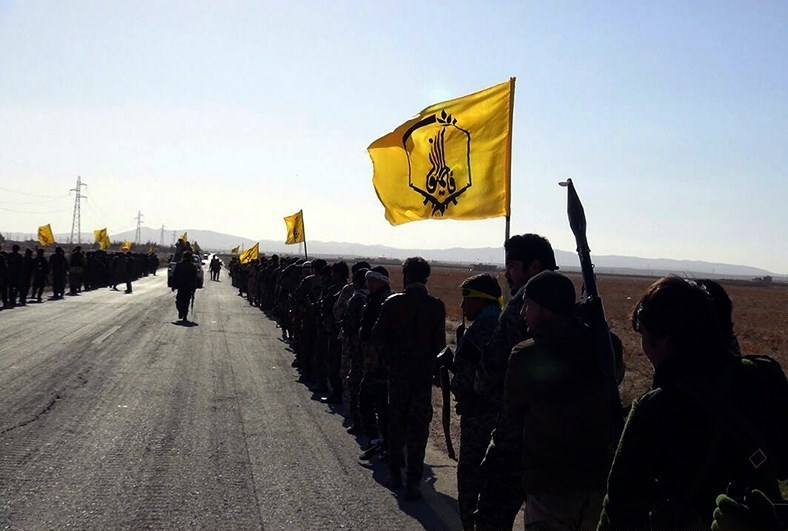
Liwa Fatemiyoun fighters during the Palmyra offensive (December 2016)

Liwa Fatemiyoun continued to suffer losses in Syria. On 6 December 2018, a fighter was buried in Iran. On 13 December 2018, a deceased Afghan was also buried in Tehran province. On 27 December 2018, an Afghan killed in Syria was buried in Mashhad. In January 2019, five Fatemiyoun fighters were also buried in Mashhad, Iran.

While more conventional operations against the Islamic State had been over for over year by 2019, Liwa Fatemiyoun remained deployed both in eastern Syria near the Iraqi border, still occasionally fighting ISIS around Deir ez-Zor, Mayadin and al-Boukamal, and also in the western Syria within the province of Hama, likely around the last rebel/jihadist enclave. It is to be recalled that Liwa Fatemiyoun was engaged on the Hama front during and after the rebel/jihadist offensive of March 2017. It had therefore remained there. It is likely that Fatemiyoun also continued to use its historic base camp south of Aleppo, and may have had other installations elsewhere, notably in Damascus. The deployment pattern, with at least three units (Deir Ezzor – Hama – Damascus) corresponds fairly closely to that seen in recent years. Liwa Fatemiyoun therefore had remained a tool in the hands of the Revolutionary Guards for their projection into Syria, until 2024.

Throughout their operations in Syria, Liwa Fatemiyoun had sustained numerous casualties. In October 2014, three fighters were captured by the rebel Islamic Front. Their fates are unknown. On 7 May 2015, Iran commemorated 49 fighters of the group who were killed. During the Aleppo offensive (November–December 2016), 31 Fatemiyoun fighters had been killed and many more had been wounded. According to Spiegel Online, 700 members of the group were believed to have been killed in combat around Daraa and Aleppo as of June 2015.

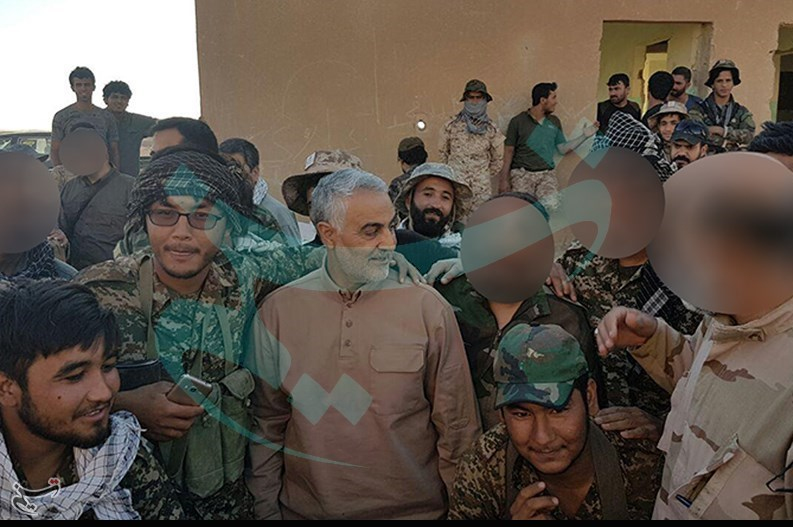
Liwa Fatemiyoun fighters with Quds Force commander Qasem Soleimani during the Syrian Desert campaign (May–July 2017).

The pro-Israel Washington Institute had estimated at least 255 casualties between 19 January 2012, and 8 March 2016. While precise casualty figures are difficult to determine, the brigade is thought to have lost 925 fighters in Syria as of May 2020 based on monitoring of open source coverage of funeral services, but these burials do not take into account the bodies abandoned on the ground, executed prisoners, the missing, etc. These numbers likely increased as the Iranian government continued to identify the remains of Fatemiyoun members, sometimes as long as 5 years after their death, and returned their bodies to Iran. According to Zohair Mojahed, a cultural official in the Fatemiyoun Brigade, the group suffered 2,000 killed and 8,000 wounded up to the end of 2017 while fighting in Syria.

Mostafa Sadrzadeh, known by the alias "Seyyed Ebrahim", an Iranian military commander who had led the Ammar Battalion of the Fatemiyoun Division, and who was also among the first commanders of the Nakhsa group, was killed in the outskirts of Aleppo in autumn of 2015 during Operation Moharram.

On 21 November 2017, Iran declared victory over IS, and subsequently started to downsize Liwa Fatemiyoun. The first troops to be demobilized were the youngest and oldest, as well as those who had exhibited problematic behaviour such as indiscipline. The demobilized fighters were sent back to Iran to return to their families and civilian life.

In the course of the COVID-19 pandemic, Liwa Fatemiyoun reportedly began to produce masks and gloves in Iran and Syria, intending to distribute them to poor Syrians. Western observers suspected that this was supposed to boost the group's image and help it in recruiting new members. By late 2020, Liwa Fatemiyoun was still operating in eastern Syria, though only about 500 to 1,500 fighters strong. By the time the Assad regime fell, this number had risen to 5,000 to 10,000.

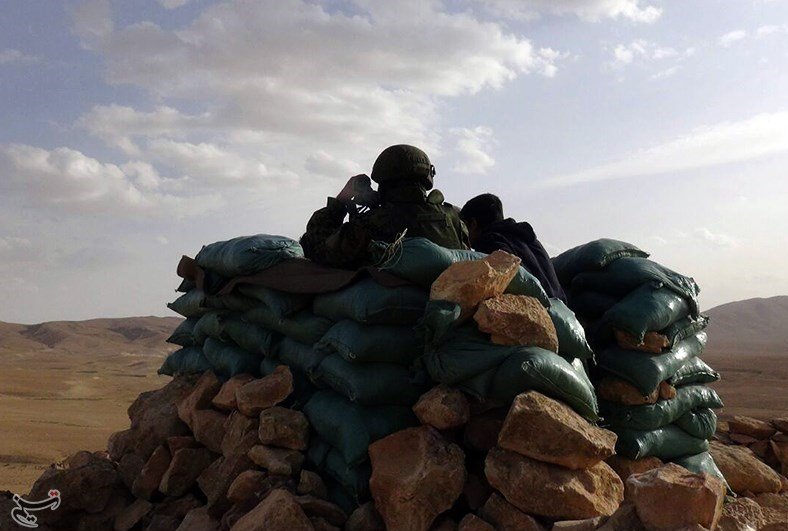
A Fatemiyoun fighter keeping watch from his position, near Palmyra

Experts differ on what role Liwa Fatemiyoun was fulfilling as of 2020, as the Syrian government had become relatively secure. Researcher Phillip Smyth argued that Liwa Fatemiyoun was supposed to act as Iran's "phantom force" of trained foreign soldiers, ready to be used for possible future interventions.

Accordingly, Symth and ex-Herat Province governor Abdul Qayoum Rahim claimed in 2020 that Liwa Fatemiyoun had begun deployment to other localities around the Middle East without providing firm evidence.

Symth and Rahim also claimed that the constant fighting had turned Liwa Fatemiyoun into an elite force, as most of its less capable fighters had been killed or demobilized, leaving only the most experienced and radical ones. Other security analysts argued that there was no evidence for further mass foreign deployments, and that Liwa Fatemiyoun was overall diminishing in numbers and suffering from low morale, as the Iranian government had proven to be slow in granting promised benefits to its fighters.

In December 2020, the Iranian Foreign Minister at the time, Mohammed Javad Zarif, offered the Fatemiyoun Brigade to the Afghan government to fight Islamic State – Khorasan Province in Afghanistan. In an interview, Zarif described the Fatemiyoun fighters as "the best forces" to fight Islamic State and said that Iran is prepared to help the Afghan government integrate the Fatemiyoun brigade under the leadership of the Afghan National Army. He claimed that Iran was supporting the brigade in Syria, but the Syrian government and military were the ones making the operational decisions of the brigade. He added, in Afghanistan, Iran is prepared to support the Fatemiyoun "under the leadership of the Afghan government," Zarif said

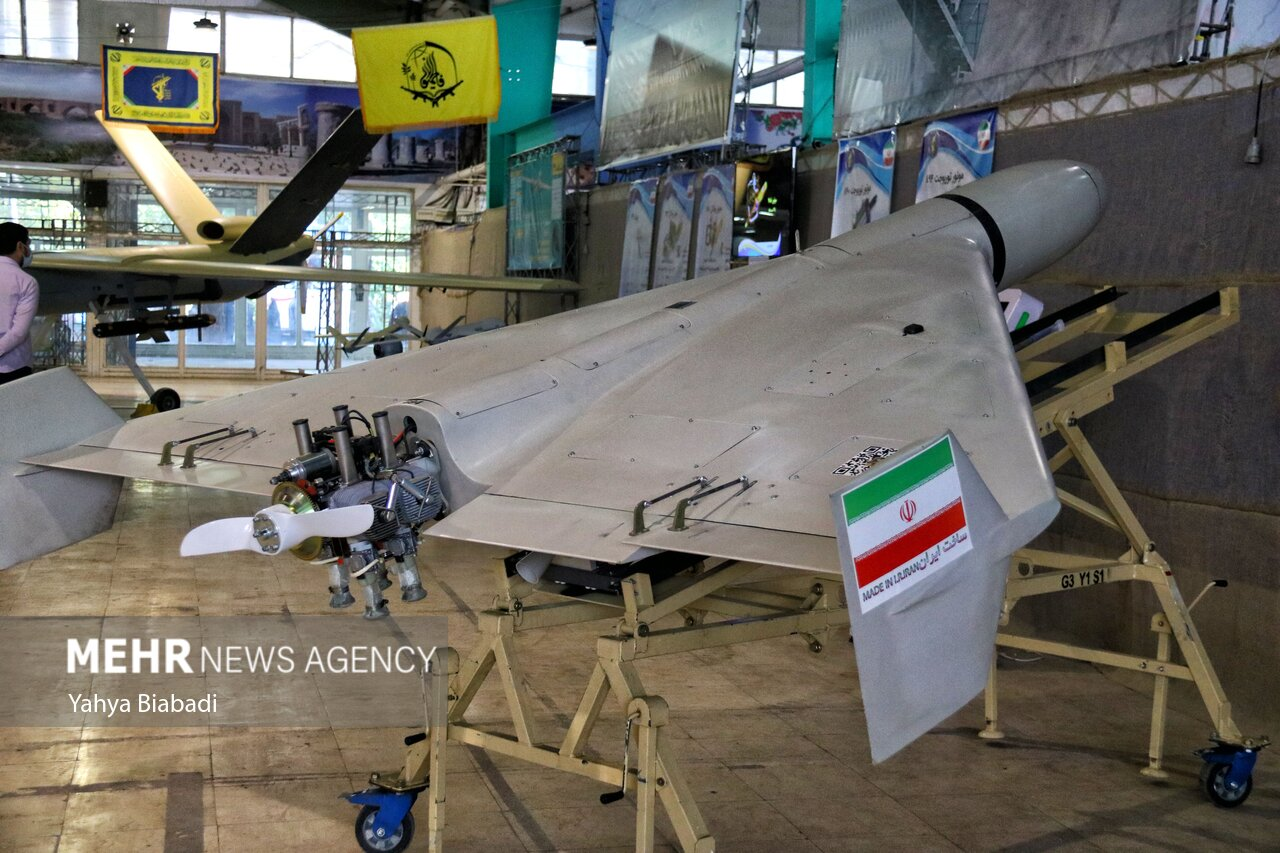
Flag of Fatemiyoun can be seen in the back along with the IRGC flag behind the Shahed drone at 2023 IRGC Aerospace Force achievements Exhibition in Kermanshah

In January 2024 the US Air force did an air strike on an abandoned warehouse which formally belonged to Liwa Fatemiyoun claiming it was being used to manufacture missiles used against US troops in the Middle East.

On 2 February, the US launched retaliatory airstrikes targeting Iran-backed militias in Iraq and Syria, in response to an attack that killed three US troops in Jordan. According to the Syrian Observatory for Human Rights, at least 35 Iran-backed militiamen were killed in the strikes in Syria including 16 fighters of the Iraqi Popular Mobilization Forces and 4 fighters of the Afghan Fatemiyoun brigade and 1 of the Zainabiyoun brigade. The fighters who were killed had their funeral ceremonies in the city of Mashhad in Iran on 7 February 2025. The Fatemiyoun fighters were identified as:

- Ali Hosseini
- Hamzeh Alavi
- Mohammad Ali Akbari
- Mohammad Reza Sadat Alavi

==== Syrian opposition offensives ====
By 2024 there were still at least 2,500 to 5,000 fighter of both Zainabiyoun and Fatemiyoun in Syria. During the 2024 Syrian opposition offensives, it was reported that 25 pro-Assad/Iran-backed militiamen were killed during the clashes with at least 15 of them being non-Syrian militiamen. These fighters were likely the last members of Hezbollah, Zanabiyoun, and Fatemiyoun, to have died in Syria before their withdrawal.

After the opposition offensives, a video by the Syrian rebels showed an abandoned base with Fatemiyoun and Iranian flags. Another showed a larger base in Idlib with walls painted with the Fatemiyoun flag and ransacked rooms with Persian language posters and signs scattered around. Reports indicated that some fighters were flown out of Syria along with Iranian forces. Others were reportedly said to have crossed into neighbouring Iraq or had followed retreating Hezbollah forces into Lebanon. After the fall of the Assad regime, hundreds of fighters from Fatemiyoun and Zainabiyoun (many of whom likely came from the Imam Ali military base) were warehoused inside complexes in the Al-Qa'im Bases and Camp Ashraf (also known as the Martyr Abu Munthadher al-Muhammadawi Camp) in Iraq's Diyala province by groups affiliated with the Popular Mobilization Forces and Islamic Resistance in Iraq.

It has been speculated that some remnants of Fatemiyoun and Zainabiyoun might have continued to have a presence in Syria while waiting for evacuation by late December of 2024.

== Role in Iran–Israel proxy conflict ==
Both Zainabiyoun and Fatmiyoun Brigades supported by Iran's Islamic Revolutionary Guard Corps (IRGC) are important parts of the Iranian construct which uses such proxy groups as a core strategy for deterrence across the region through its main proxy Hezbollah and its subgroups/allies that is Kata'ib Hezbollah, Kata'ib Sayyid ul-Shuhada, Hezbollah Al-Nujaba, Houthis and even now Hamas have been a part of Iran's strategy of deterrence from engaging in a conventional full-scale conflict with Israel and its Arab allies despite the limited employment of both the Zainabiyoun and Fatmiyoun brigades composed of Pakistani and Afghan nationals have successfully demonstrated Iran's capability to mobilize Shia ecosystems not only in the Middle East but on its other borders as well event of a war between Hezbollah-Israel and Hamas-Israel these resistance force's of Pakistan and Afghanistan formerly based in Syria are expected to carry out direct attacks on Israel under shadows either as part of Hezbollah or Islamic Resistance in Iraq or the Houthis, Iran's military strategy in Lebanon and Iraq is based on the concept of liberation of State of Palestine and elimination of the State of Israel including forward defense. It entails engaging adversaries beyond its own territory to prevent threats from reaching its border. A key pillar of this strategy is a network of Iran's IRGC-linked armed groups across the region known as the Axis of Resistance. This includes Hezbollah in Lebanon various Shitte Militias in Iraq, Yemen and Iran sponsored militias in Syria as well as the Palestinian resistance forces specifically Hamas, Palestinian Islamic Jihad and their subgroups in occupied Palestine. Reportedly, Iran supports 20 or more groups/organizations directly or indirectly all over world, strategically planned and revived by the former IRGC officer Qasem Soleimani a "genius of asymmetric warfare" In order to counter the Imperialist influence and interests of the United States, Israel and their allies. The Former Mossad director Yossi Cohen said Soleimani's strategies had "personally tightened a noose around Israel's neck".

== Organization, supplies and equipment ==
Liwa Fatemiyoun is led by IRGC-QF commanders and supplied by the Iranian military. Its troops are recruited from Afghans living in Iran, as well as Afghan refugees already residing in Syria. The recruits are typically Hazaras, an ethnic group from central Afghanistan primarily from Hazarajat in central Afghanistan. The Iranian recruiters for Liwa Fatemiyoun are usually members of the IRGC's Basij. In August 2016, Iranian official Qurban Ghalambor was arrested by the Afghanistan government for recruiting fighters for the brigade. Recruited fighters tend to be in their 20's and 30's.

=== Recruitment of former Afghan soldiers ===
It has also been reported that the group had recruited former and dissented Shia Afghan and Hazara soldiers from the Afghan National Security Forces such as the Afghan National Army and the Afghan National Police. After the 2021 Taliban offensive, many former Afghan soldiers fled to Iran, bringing equipment such as Humvees, M548s, and Navistar 7000 series heavy trucks, which were given to the Iranian Army (some of which went to the 55th Airborne Brigade) in exchange for their stay in Iran. These troops were likely recruited into the Fatemiyoun Brigade afterwards. Former Sunni Afghan soldiers were also employed by the IRGC's paramilitary volunteer militia, the Basij, after receiving special identification cards.

=== Recruitment in Afghanistan ===
In Afghanistan, pro-Iran affiliates mainly recruit fighters from the Shia Afghan youth in Kabul and from the Shia majority areas of Afghanistan, such as Herat. Those recruiting for Iran in Dashte Barchi, Kabul, usually work "off-grid" and "under the radar". The recruiters who are recruiting for Iran, after recruiting some recruits, send some of their newly recruited recruits to Iran through travel agencies based in Herat and Kabul.

=== Recruitment in Iran, training, salaries, deployments, benefits, ===
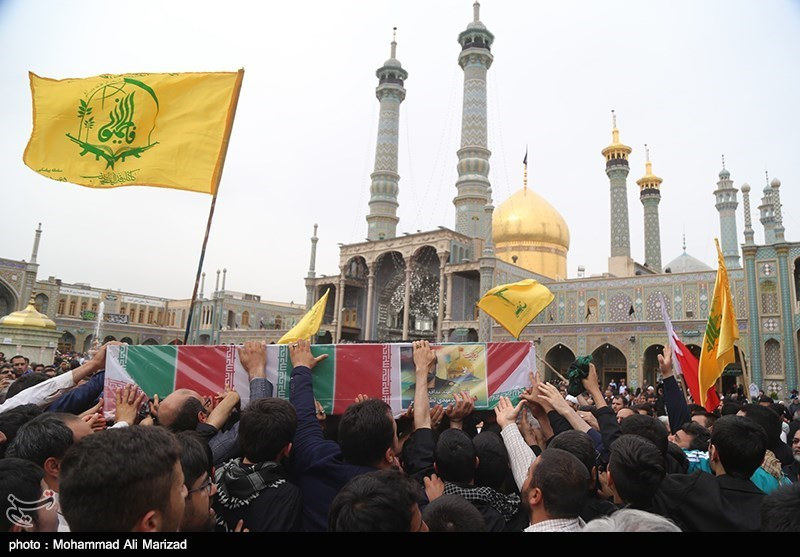
The funeral of a Holy Shrine Defender killed in Syria, with mourners waving the flags of Hezbollah as well as Liwa Fatemiyoun

The Afghans are promised Iranian citizenship and salaries of $500–$800 per month in return for fighting (usually a 3-month-long deployment to Syria). Many are refugees and some criminals who choose recruitment over imprisonment or deportation, though the Iranian government generally claims that they are religiously motivated volunteers. The first Liwa Fatemiyoun troops sent to Syria were told that they were fulfilling their "Islamic duty" by defending the shrines of Damascus. After their recruitment, the recruits of Liwa Fatemiyoun have been reported to go through a training course for five-weeks, and their military training mostly takes place in Iran's Yazd province along with some other places. There have also been reports of newly deployed recruits reportedly being sent to receive training in and around the Syrian city of Aleppo in North-Western Syria. Monthly salaries peaked at about $1,500, from-and-to 2017–2018 but have since dropped to less than a third of that amount because of Iran's economic crisis – partly a result of sanctions and the collapse of Iran's national currency.

Afghan fighters were usually sent to Syria by Iranian C-130s.

=== Training, experience, combat roles, and equipment ===
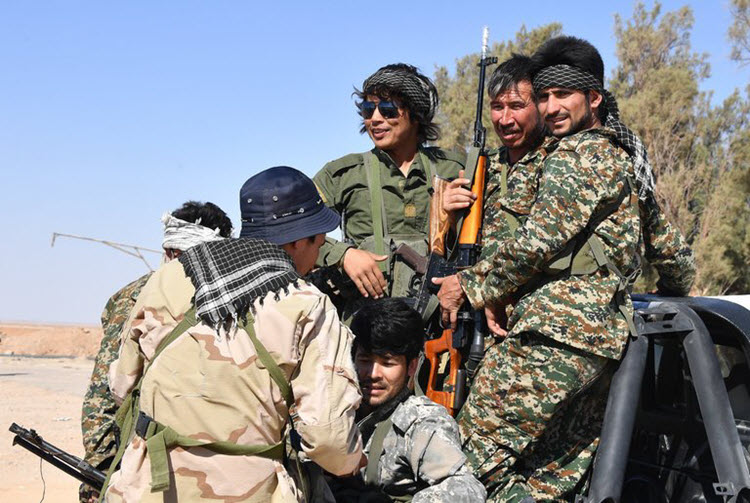
A group of Liwa Fatemiyoun fighters

Though some sub-commanders of Liwa Fatemiyoun are veterans of several wars, including the Iran–Iraq War (1980-1988), Soviet-Afghan War (1979-1989), First Afghan Civil War (1989–1992), Second Afghan Civil War (1992-1996), Third Afghan Civil War (1996–2001), and even the War in Afghanistan (2001–2021), new recruits of the unit generally lack combat experience. The recruits are given just a few weeks of training, armed, and flown to Syria via the Iran–Iraq–Syria air bridge. These soldiers are used as shock troopers, spearheading numerous important pro-government offensives alongside Iranian, Iraqi, Pakistani, and Hezbollah troops.

Some have more specialized training (reconnaissance, snipers) which is allegedly delivered by Hezbollah instructors. Most of them operate as light infantry.

Parts of Liwa Fatemiyoun have been trained by the Russian Armed Forces and Wagner Group. As the unit is often used in those war zones where the most intense fighting takes place due to its sometimes inadequate training, observers believe that Liwa Fatemiyoun fighters often act as "cannon fodder" used in Human wave attacks. By 2020, analysts such as Philip Symth argued that the "cannon fodder" troops of the unit had been mostly weeded out, leaving only a hardened core of fighters.

==== Armoured vehicles ====
Some fighters receive more thorough training and can work as tank crews. Liwa Fatemiyoun has been reported to use tanks and vehicles such as the T-72M1, T-72AV, T-62M, MT-LB armored vehicles (including ones with modified with a ZU-23 cannon), the Iranian Safir light vehicles with a 106 mm recoilless gun or Type 63 MRL, numerous technicals, and even T-90 tanks, which raised suspicion on the involvement of Russia and the Wagner Group in the training of, and supplying weapons to Fatemiyoun fighters.

=== Post-service life ===
Afghan fighters were often repatriated to Iran by Iranian C-130s.

After completing their service, many ex-Liwa Fatemiyoun fighters were frustrated that the Iranian government proved slow in fulfilling all their demands. Most importantly, fighters struggled to secure the promised benefits such as salaries, housing, and jobs due to Iran's difficult economic situation and cases of Iranian officials stalling in regards to payouts. The families of fallen fighters have also struggled to secure benefits and visas.

As early as July 2017, a researcher on Afghanistan reported the presence of a militant network of up to 4,000 militants which was led by Liwa Fatemiyoun veterans was active in Hazarajat, Kabul, and Mazar-i-Sharif, which is already reportedly conducting armed operations against groups hostile to Hazaras in Wardak province.

Other veterans, on the other hand, often try to resume a normal life in cities like Herat, while some re-enlist under financial pressure to earn money.

According to Rahmatullah Nabil, who was formerly the chief of Afghanistan's National Directorate of Security, by February of 2020, around 2,500 to 3,000 former fighters of the Fatemiyoun brigade had returned to Afghanistan.

It has been reported that former fighters of Liwa Fatemiyoun participated in the unsuccessful Balkhab uprising, a Hazara rebellion in the village of Balkhab against Taliban in the summer of 2022. The uprising was part of a larger insurgency against Taliban rule since their takeover and was led by former Hazara Taliban commander, Mahdi Mujahid, who was later killed by the Taliban after the uprising while trying to flee to Iran.

=== Distribution of land among families ===
On 22 October 2019, Hamid Qureshi, the head of the Basij Organization of Departments and Ministries of the Greater Tehran, announced that land will be donated to the families of Fatemiyoun Brigade fighters, who were killed in the Syrian civil war. Qureshi emphasized that the land donation plan to the family of the killed fighters of Lashkar-e-Fatemiyoun, was the result of their involvement with the IRGC and it was a nationwide plan that was to be done in all cities of Iran, but will start in its first stage for families living in Tehran province. According to the head of the Basij Organization of Departments and Ministries of the Greater Tehran, the first plots of land donated to the families of the killed fighters of Fatemiyoun are primarily located in Malard County, Tehran province. Qureshi said that all four families of the killed fighters of Lashkar-e-Fatemiyoun in Mallard will be given a 200 m plot of land to build homes for themselves with the participation of each other and the bank facilities provided to for them.

=== Employment by Iranian Companies ===
In 2024, it was reported that members of Fatemiyoun (both serving and retired) along with former Afghan National Security Force troops (mostly from the defunct Afghan National Army and Afghan National Police), were being employed by the Arshin Kooh company, which has links to Iran's IRGC (more specifically, its Aerospace Force), and is engaged in production of concrete walls and construction of roads in the Beris area of Chabahar, a port on the Arabian Sea, in the Sistan and Baluchestan province. Reports revealed that senior IRGC officials ordered the transfer of many of these Adfghan workers from Chabahar to Negur, after such practices were exposed.

The supervisor of the Afghan workers, Hekmat, a member of the Fatemiyoun group, has been reported to have signed a monthly contract worth 10 billion Iranian rials (over 16,000$) with Arshin Kooh for the repair and maintenance of their machinery, with Hekmat having employed at least 20 Afghan workers under his command. In addition to the machinery contract, it is said that Hekmat oversees at least 50 workers in the concrete wall section, earning as many as 600 million Iranian rials (1,000$) per day.

The average Afghan workers make more money than that which local Balochi workers, because of these contracts. According to a report, Balochi truck drivers earn 240 million rials ($400) for 24 days of work, while non-local drivers receive 360 million rials ($600), through their contracts, for the same period. This due to the contracts of companies employing Afghans migrants having a better pay than those of companies employing local Balochis.

=== Relationship with Hezbollah Afghanistan ===
According to researcher Phillip Smyth, Liwa Fatemiyoun and Hezbollah Afghanistan were originally different groups, but showed such great overlap in ideology and membership by 2014 that they had become "incorporated". In contrast, researcher Oved Lobel continued to regard Liwa Fatemiyoun and Hezbollah Afghanistan as separate organizations in 2018, though both were part of Iran's "regional proxy network". Other sources such as Jihad Intel and Arab News have treated the two as the same organization. Researcher Michael Robillard called Liwa Fatemiyoun a "branch of Hezbollah Afghanistan".

=== Recruitment and use of child soldiers ===
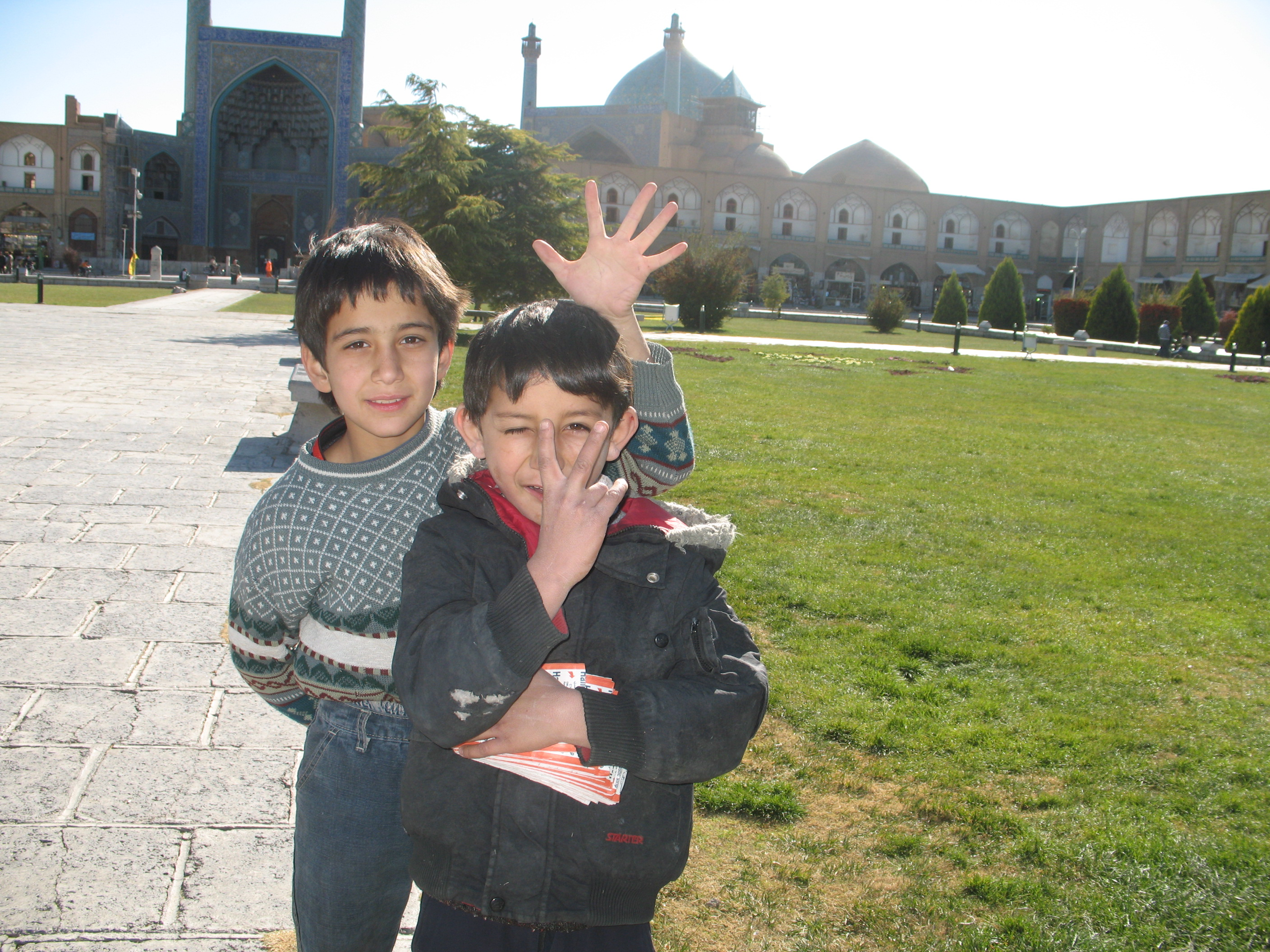
Afghan children at Naqsh-e Jahan Square in Esfahan, Iran. (2007)

According to Human Rights Watch and Amnesty International, Liwa Fatemiyoun has recruited child soldiers, some of whom were as young as 14. According to reports, many children have fought in Fatemiyoun and many have also been killed. Liwa Fatemiyoun has also glorified children, who fought and died serving and fighting for the group in Syria, as martyrs.

According to "official" Iranian sources, the first "martyr" of the Fatemiyoun brigade was Reza Ismaili. He was deployed to Syria and the age of just 17 and was killed in action two years later at the age of 19.

Human Rights Watch identified and published images of the tombstones of Fatemiyoun soldiers killed in the Syrian war and buried in Iran in 2017. At the time of their deaths, many of fighters buried were between the ages of 14 and 17.

== Designation as terrorist organization ==
In 2019, the United States and Canada each declared the Fatemiyoun a terrorist organization. According to then Treasury Secretary Steven Mnuchin, the designation of the Fatemiyoun as a terrorist organization was part of an "ongoing pressure campaign to shut down the illicit networks the Iranian regime uses to export terrorism and unrest across the globe."

== See also ==
- List of armed groups in the Syrian Civil War
- List of armed groups in the War in Iraq (2013–2017)
- Foreign fighters in the Syrian civil war and War in Iraq
- Foreign fighters in the Syrian civil war
- List of armed groups in the Yemeni civil war
- Liwa Zainabiyoun
- Holy Shrine Defender
- Hüseynçilər/Husayniyun
- Hezbollah

== Bibliography ==
- AFPC (2017). The World Almanac of Islamism 2017. Lanham, Maryland; London; New York City: Rowman & Littlefield. ISBN 978-1442273443.
- Robillard, Michael (2021). Paul Burke; Doaa' Elnakhala; Seumas Miller (eds.). Global Jihadist Terrorism: Terrorist Groups, Zones of Armed Conflict and National Counter-Terrorism Strategies. Northampton: Edward Elgar Publishing. pp. 167–187. ISBN 978-1-80037-129-3.
