= Daraa Military Council =

Rebel coalition active in Daraa Governorate

- Leader: Colonel Ahmad Al-Nemeh
- Dates active: 2012-2015?
- Groups: Dawn of Islam Division; Muhajireen and Ansar Brigade; Hamza Division (left to form the First Army in January 2015); 1st Artillery Regiment (left to form the First Army in January 2015)
- Active regions: Daraa Governorate
- Part of: Free Syrian Army; Southern Front
- Wars: the Syrian Civil War

The Daraa Military Council was a rebel coalition active in Daraa Governorate. The Daraa MC was the dominant rebel organization in Daraa Governorate in 2012, the year it was created. The group's leader, the defected Syrian Air Force colonel Ahmad Al-Nemeh who succeeded in uniting rebel groups in the province, was arrested by al-Nusra Front on 4 May 2014 and put on trial before a Sharia court.

== See also ==
- List of armed groups in the Syrian Civil War
