= Tavassoli =

Tavassoli or Tavasoli (Persian: توسلی) is a Persian-language surname. Notable people with the surname include:

- Ali Reza Tavassoli (1962–2015), Afghan military officer
- Hanieh Tavassoli (born 1979), Iranian actress
- Mohammad-Reza Tavassoli (1931–2008), Iranian theologian and politician
- Mohammad Tavassoli (born 1938), Iranian activist and politician
- Ben Tavassoli, British actor known for New Blood series
- Fatemah Tavassoli, Professor at University of Florida
