= Saber Safar =

Syrian Army officer

- صابر صفر
- Born: 1967 (age 58–59); Abtaa, Syria
- Military career
- Allegiance: Ba'athist Syria (until 2013); Syrian opposition (2013–2024)
- Branch: Syrian Arab Air Force (until 2013) (Syrian opposition) Free Syrian Army: Southern Front
- Rank: Colonel
- Units: 2nd Air Force Battalion (until 2013) First Army: Hamza Division
- Commands: Commander-in-chief of the 1st Army (2015)
- Conflicts: Syrian civil war; Daraa Governorate campaign; Daraa offensive (January 2015); 2015 Southern Syria offensive; Daraa and As-Suwayda offensive (June 2015); Daraa offensive (June–July 2015)

Saber Safar Fares (Arabic: صابر صفر فارس) is a Syrian military officer who served as a colonel in the Free Syrian Army during the Syrian Civil War. Fares defected from the Syrian Armed Forces to the FSA in 2013 and founded the Hamza Division. Beginning in 2015, he held the position of overall commander in the First Army of the Southern Front and was reportedly the highest ranking FSA officer in southern Syria.

== History ==
In August 2015, Saber Safar survived an assassination attempt in the 1st Army headquarters in the town of Abtaa.
