= Kata'ib Sayyid ul-Shuhada =

Shia Iraqi militia

Kata'ib Sayyid al-Shuhada
- كتائب سيد الشهداء
- Leaders: Mojtaba Khamenei (Supreme Leader of Iran); Abu Ala al-Walai; Abu Mustafa al-Sheibani
- Dates active: 2013–present
- Country: Iraq
- Allegiance: Iran; Islamic Revolutionary Guard Corps
- Group: Liwa al-Sayyida Ruqayya (The Ja'afari Force)
- Active regions: Saladin Governorate, Iraq; Damascus Governorate, Syria; Daraa Governorate
- Ideology: Shia Islamism; Wilayat al Faqih; Khomeinism; Anti-Zionism
- Size: 10,000 (December 2020)
- Part of: Popular Mobilization Forces; Islamic Resistance in Iraq (since 2020); Axis of Resistance
- Wars: Syrian Civil War; Battle of Al-Shaykh Maskin; 2015 Southern Syria offensive; War in Iraq (2013–2017); Salahuddin campaign; Second Battle of Tikrit
- Website: Official website

The Master of Martyrs Battalion, better known as Kata'ib Sayyid ul-Shuhada' (KSS; Arabic: كتائب سيد الشهداء, Battalion of the Master of Martyrs) and officially the 14th Brigade, is a Shia Iraqi paramilitary group formed in 2013. Its stated mission is to protect "(Shia) shrines across the globe", preserve "Iraqi unity" and to "put an end to the sectarian conflict". KSS is funded, trained and equipped by IRGC's Quds Force and Hezbollah.

The group has been described as an Iranian proxy, and is one of the original militias that formed the Popular Mobilization Forces in 2014. The group has close ties to Badr Organization and the IRGC.

KSS was also active in Syria, where its main focus was the protection of the Sayyidah Zaynab Mosque in a southern suburb of Damascus. It militarily supported the Syrian ba'athist government and participated in the Syrian Civil War. It notably engaged in the Battle of Al-Shaykh Maskin where it fought alongside Syrian government forces.

On November 17, 2023, KSS and its leader Hashim Finyan Rahim al-Saraji (also known as Abu Ala al-Walai) were declared Specially Designated Global Terrorists (SDGT) under the counterterrorism authority Executive Order 13224 by the United States. Additionally, al-Saraji was placed on Office of Foreign Assets Control's Specially Designated Nationals (SDN) List. On 18 September 2025, the U.S. Department of State designated Kata'ib Sayyid al-Shuhada and its aliases as a Foreign Terrorist Organization under section 219 of the Immigration and Nationality Act.

According to the Washington Institute for Near East Policy, KSS was built around the network of Abu Mustafa al-Sheibani, a former Kata'ib Hezbollah figure who focused on operations in the Syrian civil war after being sidelined within KH. The same profile states that leadership of KSS passed to Abu Ala al-Walai in 2014, and that the group later operated the 14th Brigade of the Popular Mobilization Forces.

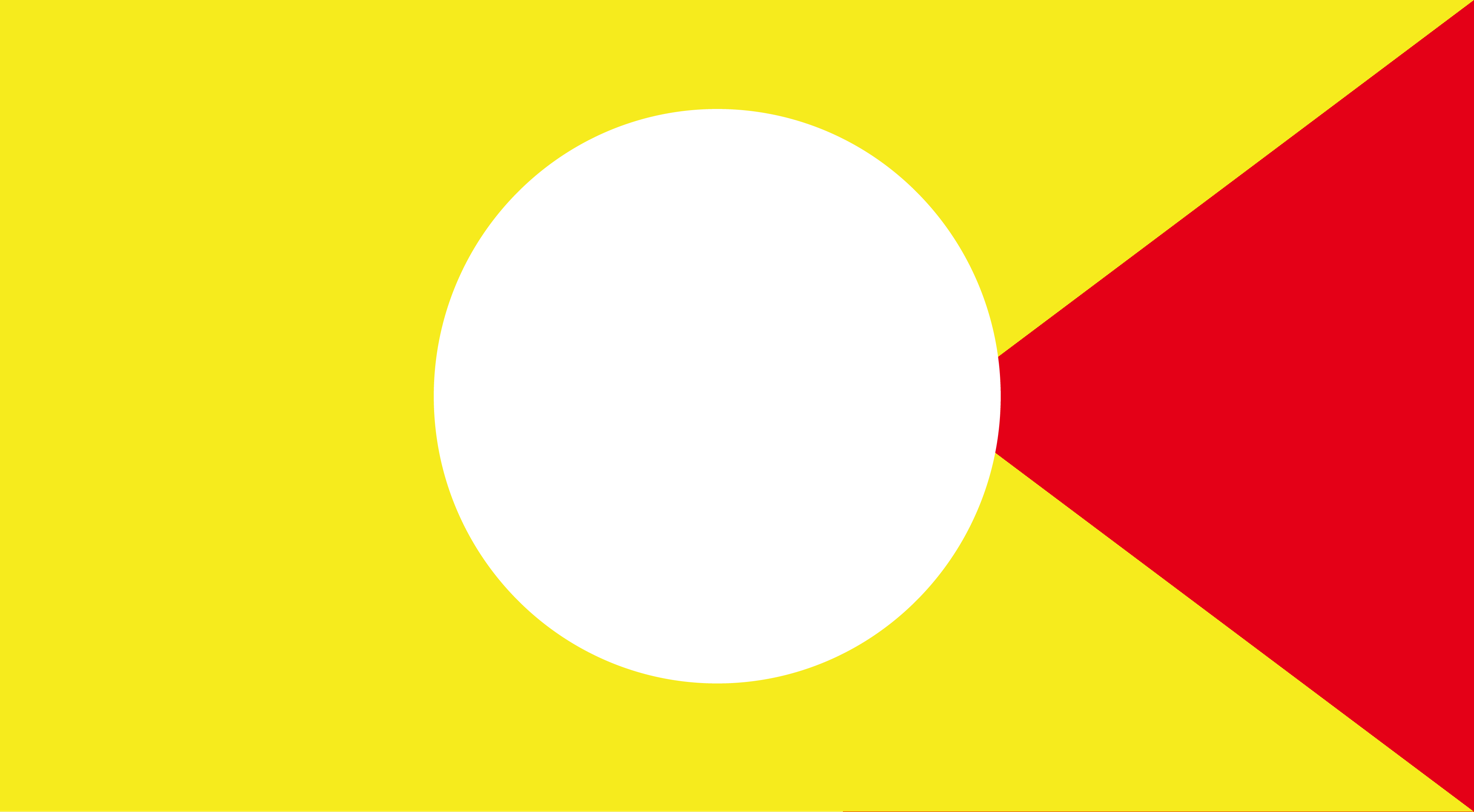
The flag of Kata'ib Sayyid ul-Shuhada minus the logo for copyright purposes

== See also ==
- List of armed groups in the War in Iraq
- List of armed groups in the Syrian Civil War
- Popular Mobilization Forces
- Holy Shrine Defender
- Private militias in Iraq
