= 2015 Southern Syria offensive =

Military operation

- Part of the Syrian Civil War
- Syrian Government control Opposition control Contested
Date	7 February – 13 March 2015 (1 month and 6 days)
Location	Daraa Governorate, Rif Dimashq Governorate and Quneitra Governorate, Syria
Result	Phase one: Syrian Army and allies victory Phase two: Stalemate: Government forces capture seven towns and villages and eight hills

Belligerents
Free Syrian Army; Islamic Front al-Nusra Front; Islamic Muthanna Movement; Jamaat Bayt al-Maqdis al-Islamiya	(Syria) Syrian Arab Republic; Iran; Hezbollah; Liwa Fatemiyoun; Kata'ib Sayyid al-Shuhada; Jaysh al-Wafaa

Commanders and leaders
Gen. Bashar al-Zoubi (Southern Front leader); Maj. Abu Osama al-Jolani; Col. Saber Safar (leader of the First Army); Mukhtar Abu Omar † (top military leader of al-Nusra Front in Southern Syria)	(Iran) Maj. Gen. Qasem Soleimani; Mustafa Badreddine (Syria) Maj. Gen. Suheil Salman Hassan (5th Mechanized Division) (Syria) Brig. Gen. Mahmoud Mustafa † (Iran) Col. Abbas Abdollahi †; Ali Reza Tavassoli † (Leader of Liwa Fatemiyoun)

Units involved
Southern Front; First Army; Islamic Front; Ahrar ash-Sham	Syrian Armed Forces; Syrian Army; 5th Mechanized Division; 7th Infantry Division; 9th Armored Division; 10th Armored Division; National Defence Force; IRGC; Quds Force

Strength
2,500	5,000: 300 Hezbollah

Casualties and losses
294 killed (Syrian Army claim); 300 killed and wounded (rebel claim)	63 killed (Syrian Army claim); 43 killed, 10–12 executed, 40 captured (SOHR claim); 400 killed and 1 captured (rebel claim)

The 2015 Southern Syria offensive, code-named "Operation Martyrs of Quneitra", was an offensive launched in southern Syria during the Syrian Civil War by the Syrian Arab Army, Hezbollah and Islamic Revolutionary Guard Corps forces. Government forces also include Iranian sponsored Afghani Shi'ite volunteer militias. The name "Operation Martyrs of Quneitra" refers to the January 2015 Mazraat Amal incident, in which several high level Hezbollah and IRGC members were killed in an Israeli strike.

After Syrian troops and their allies captured 15 towns, villages and hills, the operation slowed and stalled during attempts to advance on Kafr Shams and Kafr Nasij. The gains by pro-government troops were described as limited, while the pro-Damascus As-Safir reported the gains were a "devastating" defeat for the rebels. Most viewed the offensive as unsuccessful, with the rebels "weathering" the "collapsed" offensive.

== Background ==
In October 2014, the rebels captured the electronic warfare station at Tal al-Harra thanks to the defection of General Mahmoud Abu Araj, who remained in his Syrian Arab Army position while passing intel to insurgent forces and sowing discord between Army forces and their Iranian allies; this led to the execution of as many as 56 Army officers in an attempt to stem the intel leaks. The recapture of Tal al-Harra would be one of the main objectives of the coming offensive.

The strategic aims of the offensive were the recapture of Tal al-Harra, the elimination of a perceived rebel-Israeli buffer zone protected by Al-Nusra Front forces in the area between Israel and Syria, guarding the Syrian capital of Damascus against further rebel encroachment, preventing the Syrian rebels from establishing a southeastern front in Lebanon and cutting off rebel supply lines leading to Jordan. An additional aim of the offensive was the creation of a Hezbollah-controlled "Golan front" (Note: "Resistance front" and "third front" are also used) against Israel. The offensive focused on a triangle of rebel-held territory from rural areas southwest of Damascus to Daraa city to Quneitra, with the initial focus being on seizing the villages of Kafr Shams, Zimreen and Deir al-Adas.

A source close to senior Hezbollah figures stated that the start date of the offensive was accelerated due to the assassination carried out by Israel in the Golan heights of several high-ranking Hezbollah and Iranian military figures.

== Offensive ==
=== Initial government advance ===
On 7 February 2015, the Army's 5th Armored Division, along with reinforcements from the 7th Infantry Division, launched the offensive in the northern part of Daraa province. During the first day's fighting, 10 rebels were killed in clashes around Kafr Shams.

On 8 February, government forces bombarded multiple towns in Daraa province and heavy fighting ensued which left 11 rebels dead. The heaviest clashes occurred at Kafr Shams. The military also bombarded the towns of Om Batena and Mashara in the Quneitra province, as the Army's 9th Division launched an offensive in that governorate as well. According to a military source, government forces captured several hills. Meanwhile, in Rif Dimashq province government troops managed to capture Tall Marri hill, but were unable to advance towards the town of Deir Makir. The capture of Tall Marri hill was significant because it cut a rebel supply line and increased the isolation of rebel-held pockets around the city of Damascus.

On 9 February, fighting erupted in Deir Makir and around Deir al-Adas in Daraa where four rebels were killed and two Army tanks were destroyed. By the end of the day, the Army, supported by the NDF, Hezbollah and Iranian fighters, advanced in the al-Ollayqat area near Deir al-Adas. Military sources reported that 65% Deir al-Adas, as well as Tal Ghasham near Kafr Shams, were captured. The Army also captured the village of Tayha.

According to the rebels, government troops were supported by a large number of Afghan fighters as well during the offensive in Daraa and Rif Dimashq.

On the morning of 10 February, the Army ambushed a group of Al-Nusra Front rebels at the village of Mahjat, in northern Daraa, leaving between 8 and 19 fighters dead. Meanwhile, fighting in Der al-Adas left another eight rebels dead, while government troops advanced and captured Deir Makir, al-Danaji and Habariyah. Later the military secured Deir al-Adas, with over 40 rebels and 23 soldiers being killed during the battle for the town.

During the day, government artillery and air strikes hit rebel positions in Mashara, directly east of Quneitra and Harrah, to cut off rebels in Daraa from the Golan. A reporter for the Lebanese al-Mayadeen news channel, embedded with the Syrian Army, reported from Quneitra that the offensive had cut an important rebel supply route from Jordan to opposition-held areas west of Damascus. Army artillery from Tall Ghurabah hill also struck rebel positions on Tall Antar hill, near Kafr Shams, during the day.

On 11 February, the Army and Hezbollah captured the hills of al-Arus and al-Sarja, near Deir Makir and al-Mseeh hill near Deir al Adas, and advanced towards Sultaniyah, which they bombarded. Meanwhile, Harrah residents reportedly asked rebel fighters to evacuate so to avoid any potential clashes in the town. At this point, the second phase of the government's Daraa offensive was started with fighting happening all along the frontline. In Rif Dimashq, according to SOHR, fighting raged around Tall Fatima hill where a number of soldiers were captured, as well as around Hamrit with one tank being destroyed, and over Tall Antar and Tall Alaqiyah.

On 12 February, rapid advances by government forces slowed because of a snowstorm in the region. Still, the military captured the Ghirbal area of the town of Kafr Nasij, where fighters from Deir al-Adas had retreated to and were continuing to fight. After this, the commander of the rebel FSA 24th Division issued an urgent call for reinforcements. Fierce fighting also occurred in Sultaniyah, while the Army seized Tall Fatima hill and pushed the rebels toward Tall Qrein hill. Kafr Shams was also coming under attack.

=== Offensive stalls ===
In the following days, the rebels managed to recapture Tayha and Habariyah.

On 14 February, government forces continued to bombard Kafr Shams, Kafr Nasij and Tall Antar hill. Two Iranian IRGC officers (one of them a colonel) were killed in Kafr Nasij that day, while two reporters from the pro-government Al-Ekhbariya TV channel were wounded by rebel shelling on Deir al-Adas. According to the SOHR, 10 soldiers were executed on the charge of passing information to the enemy, while 5,000 more reinforcements were ordered to fight the rebels in the south. An Al-Nusra Front counter-attack on Deir al-Adas was reportedly repelled with 19 rebels and 11 soldiers being killed.

On 15 February, the Syrian Air Force resumed bombing rebel positions, after being forced to remain on the ground for five days due to bad weather conditions. Rebels claimed to have captured a senior Iranian officer and a Russian military missile system operator on the Daraa frontline. However, the Southern Front spokesman denied the claim of Iranian prisoners, but confirmed that the bodies of the two Iranian officers were in rebel possession.

On 17 February, a Hezbollah attack on Mashara was repelled. Still, fighting continued in the area of the village and the next day a military source reported Hezbollah had captured Syria Tel Hill. At the same time, the al-Nusra Front started a counter-attack to recapture all ground lost since the start of the offensive and managed to advance near al-Danaji.

On 19 February, the al-Nusra Front recaptured Tall Fatima and advanced towards Deir Maker. However, after fierce resistance from the 9th Armored Division, al-Nusra retreated to the recently captured hill after suffering 22 dead. The next day, a military source reported that Hezbollah continued their fierce assault on the al-Nusra Front south of the recently captured Syria Tel Hill, where they reportedly advanced further south in the village of Mashara, while in Al-Hamidiyyeh, the 9th Armored Division reportedly progressed towards the village cemetery after fierce clashes for two straight days. Later in the day, the Army recaptured Tall Fatima. However, on 21 February, fighting renewed for Tall Fatima.

On 25 February, after three days of inactivity due to harsh weather, Hezbollah made an attempt to capture Al-Hamidiyyeh and reportedly killed 16 rebels.

=== Renewed government advance ===
Over 27 and 28 February, government troops captured Sultaniyah, Habariyah, Hamrit and Sabsabah, as well as Tall Qrein and Tall Fatima hills. The battle for Tall Qrein lasted two hours. Heavy fighting continued in the Tal al-Allaqiya, Tal Samn, Aqrabah, Simlin and around Kafr Nasij and Kafr Shams where government forces attempted to advance. During the two-day clashes, at least 26 soldiers and 19–51 rebels were killed.

On 1 March, the Army made new attempts to advance at Kafr Shams, while they captured Tall al-Bazzaq and Rajm al-Sayd hill, also known as Tal al-Sayyad. Syrian troops and Hezbollah also managed to advance to within 10 kilometers from Tal al-Harra, capturing hills overlooking it. At this point, the Army stated they had completed the first phase of their offensive, creating a buffer-zone between northwest Daraa and the West Ghouta area of Rif Dimashq. The second planned phase would be a two-pronged attack, with the 7th Division attempting to capture Kafr Shams, while Hezbollah and the 9th Division will look to capture Kafr Nasij, after which both divisions and Hezbollah would link up at ‘Aqraba. A large part of the offensive would consist from the 9th Division and Hezbollah’s advance to Nabi Sakhar and their capture of ‘Umm Batna and Mashara. The Syrian Brigadier General Mahmoud Mustafa (commander of a commando unit) was reportedly killed in Hebbariye, Quneitra, that day.

On 3 March, it was reported that seven Afghan pro-government fighters were buried, including the commander of the Afghan volunteer Fatemiyoun Brigade, Alireza Tavassoli, who was killed on 28 February in Daraa province. That day, an operation room, consisting of Jabhat al-Nusra, Ahrar ash-Sham, Jamaat Bayt al-Maqdis al-Islamiya and the Islamic Muthanna Movement, was established in Daraa. The Free Syrian Army's First Army played a secondary role in this operation room. The reason for this, was the repeated failures to repel government attacks and the lack of unity among the moderate rebel groups. Most of the Southern Front affiliated groups refused to play a significant role in the battle.

=== Offensive's second phase ===
The second phase of the offensive started 4 March, with the military and Hezbollah attacking Tal Al-Mal, Kafr Shams and Kafr Nasij at the same time. At Tal Al-Mal, they reportedly managed to break through rebel defenses, while the clashes at Kafr Shams left 17 rebels and 8 soldiers dead, according to a military source.

On 11 March, the Syrian Air Force bombed the headquarters of the First Army in the southern countryside of Quneitra, killing a number of rebels including the First Army's commander. Four days later, Lebanese, Hezbollah-affiliated, television station Al-Manar reported that 120 Jabhat al-Nusra fighters, including three field commanders, were killed in another air-raid in Quneitra province.

On 13 March, after almost two weeks of fighting, the military reportedly advanced towards the southwestern part of Kafr Nasij.

== Aftermath ==
On 6 April, rebels launched a counter-attack in the Kafr Shams area, advanced and captured a checkpoint. The same day, an ambush in Khan Arnaba, in Quneitra province, conducted by government troops left six rebels dead and many others missing. Between 6 and 8 April, at least 35 rebels were killed during the counter-attack, which resulted in the capture of several Army checkpoints and positions.

On 20 April, the Syrian Army, backed by the NDF and the PLA, launched a new offensive near the town of Busra al-Harir and captured five villages, cutting the rebel supply line between Jordan and rebel positions in the Lajat area. An assault on Busra al-Harir itself was repelled. The next day, the Army reportedly retreated from around Busra al-Harir and the rebels re-established their supply route and liberated the five villages. 37 rebels and 28 soldiers were killed and five Army tanks were destroyed during the operation. A number of pro-government troops were also captured, including some foreign fighters. Over the next 24 hours, another 37 rebels and 11 soldiers were killed, according to a military source.

== Analysis ==
The offensive was seen as a strategic Axis of Resistance effort against Israel as well as an attempt to broaden the appeal of the Axis to groups such as Hamas.

The leader of the Iran-backed and trained Fatemiyoun Brigade, Ali Reza Tavassoli, was killed during this battle.

Following the offensive, as part of the internal disputes in regard to the Iranians, Maj. Gen. Rustum Ghazaleh was severely attacked by Lt. Gen. Rafik Shehadeh's bodyguards for disagreeing with the role of foreign forces aiding government troops, and both were reportedly fired from their positions. News emerged two months later that Ghazaleh had died after complications from a severe head wound, after having been "clinically dead" for several weeks.

Jordan signaled as a result of the offensive that it was no longer willing to tolerate the Syrian government's increasing reliance upon Iranian and Hezbollah support, with a Jordanian official stating "We cannot allow Iran to come to our backyard. They have entertained too many ideas lately with Soleimani calling the shots". New weapons and logistical support also arrived from Saudi Arabia in reaction to the increased foreign support of the Syrian government. This increased support by Jordan and Saudi Arabia to opposition forces led to the rebel capture of Bosra in late March and the rebel takeover of the Nasib border crossing with Jordan at the beginning of April.

In the opinion of Jeffrey White from the Washington Institute for Near East Policy, the offensive "produced small gains with substantial regime casualties" and the intervention of government allies, due to its declining capabilities, could not change the outcome.
