= Nakhsa =

IRGC-affiliated Iranian militia

- نخسا
- Active: 2015–present
- Country: Iran
- Allegiance: Ali Khamenei
- Branch: (Islamic Revolutionary Guard Corps) IRGC
- Type: Infantry, paramilitary, law enforcement
- Role: Shock troops, crowd control, riot control
- Part of: Islamic Revolutionary Guard Corps; Basij
- Headquarters: Haya'at al-Reza
- Patron: Naksa
- Mottos: Persian: بذار منم برم "Let me go too" Arabic: المقاومة الإسلامية حول العالم "Islamic Resistance Around the World"
- Colors: Yellow
- Major engagements: Syrian Civil War; 2018 Dervish protests 2019–2020 Iranian protests 2022–2023 Mahsa Amini protests Middle Eastern crisis (2023–2026); 2025–2026 Iranian protests

Commanders
- Known commanders: Mostafa Sadrzadeh (alias 'Seyyed Ebrahim') †

Self-Mobilized Forces of the Islamic Lands (Persian: نیروهای خودجوش سرزمین‌های اسلامی, romanized: Nirveyaye Khodjush Sarzaminnpehei Islami, lit. 'Spontaneous forces of Islamic lands'), also called the Self-Mobilized Forces of the Army of Islam (Persian: نیروهای خودجوش ارتش اسلام, romanized: Nirveyaye Khodjoosh ertash eslam, lit. 'Voluntary forces of the Army of Islam'), abbreviated in Farsi as NAKHSA (Persian: نخسا), is a paramilitary group active in the Syrian civil war and in suppressing Iran’s 2022 protests. NAKHSA participated in the 2018 Dervish protests (also known as the Golestan Haftom protests), as well as in the crackdown on Iran’s November 2019 protests. Following Hamas’ "Operation Al-Aqsa Flood" against Israel, images were published showing the presence of NAKHSA forces near the Syrian-Israeli border.

== Formation ==
According to a NAKHSA member who was interviewed, NAKHSA became active during the Iranian Green Movement protests and, from the very beginning, stepped in to assist the security forces. Some of them also came to Tehran from cities that had remained calm. This is where the "self-mobilization" began, and that was where NAKHSA forces first got to know one another.

This armed group has never been officially sanctioned by the state and it is unclear which of Iran's security or military institutions it belongs to. Their insignia and their presence in Syria indicate that they are likely affiliated with the Islamic Revolutionary Guard Corps (IRGC). One of the group's commanders, Moqdad, stated in an interview with Daneshjoo News Agency on 14 November 2016: “We fight alongside Hezbollah forces, Iraqi Kata’ib [Hezbollah], the Popular Mobilization Forces (Hashd al-Shaabi), Syria’s National Defence Forces, and the Fatemiyoun”.

The group describes itself as “self-mobilized” and as devotees of Ali Khamenei and Qasem Soleimani, and in addition to military activities, it is also active in the propaganda sphere. These activities include slogans printed on T-shirts, the production of leather bracelets, and decorative watches bearing the NAKHSA logo, aimed at supporters and those who describe themselves as the “third generation of the Revolution” and regard Qasem Soleimani as their role model.

Kayhan London describes NAKHSA as a collection of volunteers and organized Basij forces who, with the help of IRGC lobbies, fight alongside Hezbollah in support of Bashar al-Assad, while also keeping an eye on the future and a possible confrontation with Israel. According to Kayhan London, "Let me go too" is one of the popular chants among NAKHSA forces, and Hayat al-Reza is their main base.

== Commanders ==
Mostafa Sadrzadeh, known by the alias "Seyyed Ebrahim", an Iranian commander of the Ammar Battalion of the Fatemiyoun Division, was among the first commanders of the NAKHSA group. He was killed in the outskirts of Aleppo in autumn of 2015 during Operation Moharram.

== Insignia ==
The flag of the group is light-yellow with the emblem of the group depicting a sniper rifle on it with the ا (Aleph) of word 'Naksa' in Persian holding the Rifle. In most of the photographs published of its members, they are armed with sniper weapons. The sniper rifle that NAKHSA introduced in one image as standard equipment for its members is the Soviet-made Dragunov sniper rifle.
