= Daraa offensive (June–July 2015) =

Rebel operation in the Syrian Civil War

- Part of the Syrian Civil War
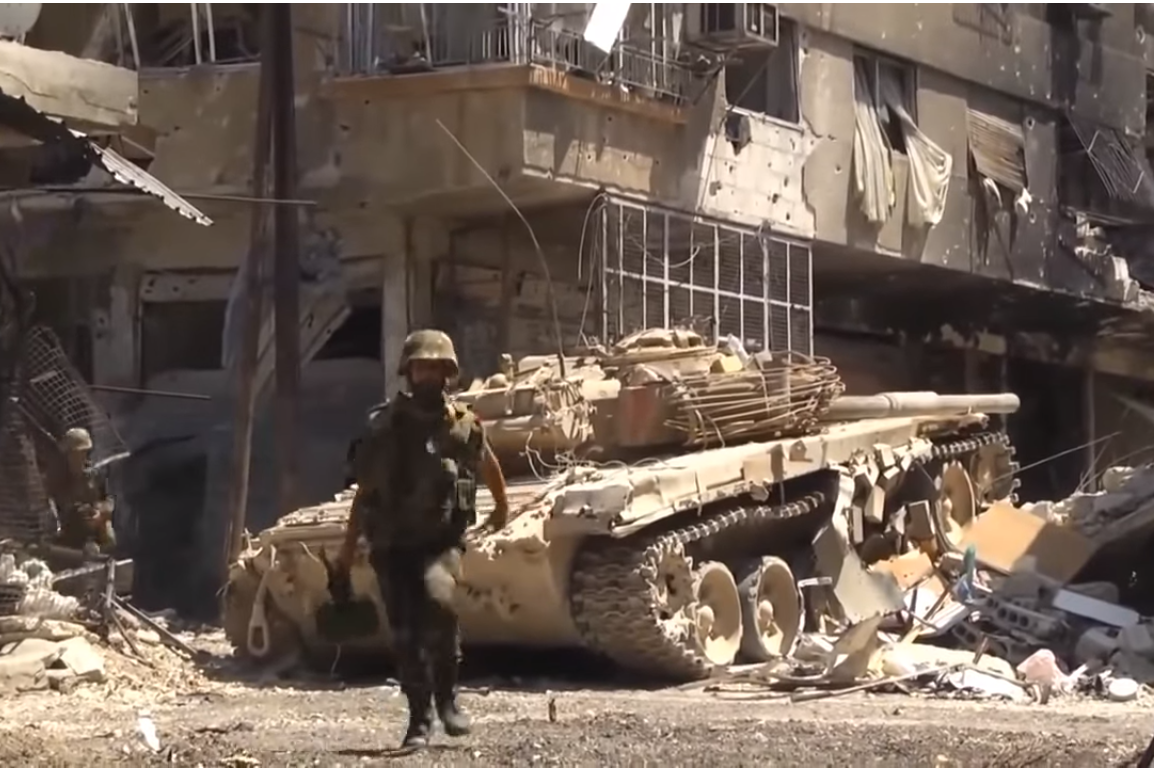
Date	25 June – 10 July 2015 (2 weeks and 1 day)
Location	Daraa, Daraa Governorate, Syria
Result	Syrian Army victory

Belligerents
Free Syrian Army; Army of Conquest; Al-Nusra Front; Ahrar ash-Sham; Jaysh al-Islam; Islamic Muthanna Movement	(Syria) Syrian Arab Republic; Hezbollah

Commanders and leaders
Zahran Alloush Zakaria Abboud (Falluja Houran commander); Amin Abboud (Falluja Houran deputy commander)	(Syria) Mohammed Khaled al-Hannous (Daraa governor)

Units involved
Free Syrian Army; Southern Front; First Army; Hamza Division; Army of Free Tribes	Syrian Armed Forces; National Defense Force; Shabiha

Strength
1,000+	Unknown

Casualties and losses
70+ killed (SOHR claim); 200+ killed (SAA claim); 200 killed (Al Rai claim)	34+ killed, 3 captured (SOHR claim); 28 killed (military claim)
- 11 civilians killed

The Daraa offensive ("Operation Southern Storm" or "Aasefat al-Janoub") was a rebel operation in the Daraa Governorate, during the Syrian Civil War. It was led by the Southern Front of the Free Syrian Army and also included the Army of Conquest "southern sector", of which the Al-Qaeda-linked al-Nusra Front and Ahrar al-Sham are part of, against Syrian government forces defending Daraa city and the surrounding towns.

== The offensive ==
=== Repulsion of initial assault ===
Map of the offensive showing the furthest extent of rebel advances

Prior to 25 June 2015, Syrian government administration had been evacuated from Daraa much the same way as they had before the Second Battle of Idlib, and the Southern Storm command declared the Damascus–Daraa road a "closed military zone" to try to stop supplies and reinforcements getting to soldiers in Daraa.

The offensive, which was planned by the Free Syrian Army and involved a new "higher central operations room", began with the FSA and other rebel groups (54 in total) storming Daraa al-Balad District and the Al-Manasheer District of Daraa city in the early morning. Rebels also attacked the town of Ghazleh. The Syrian Army responded by dropping at least 60 barrel bombs on rebel positions. Rebels advanced towards the western entrance of Daraa and captured five checkpoints near the national hospital and Air Force Intelligence building, but were reportedly pushed back by government forces around Dara’a Al-Balad and Al-Manasheer. The rebel attack on the Damascus–Daraa highway was also reportedly repelled.

Mohammed al-Asfar, a 19-year-old Al Jazeera Arabic cameraman, was killed by shelling during fighting on 26 June. By this point, opposition activists claimed that rebel forces had made further advances, capturing the headquarters of the State Security and the Air Force Intelligence branch, which allegedly left them in control of 85% of Daraa city. However, two days later, although pro-government Al-Masdar News acknowledged that the rebels achieved some success at the town of ‘Itman, north of the city, and inside the Industrial District, it stated that many of these gains had been reversed. In addition, days later, a commander who was a member of the rebel media office confirmed opposition media had exaggerated rebel gains and described the announcement that wide areas of Daraa were captured, as well as the coming of the battle days before it was launched, as "media chaos and publishing [of] inaccurate news" which the offensive's operation room could not restrain.

On 27 June, the operation room of the "Southern Storm" battle was attacked by Islamist gunmen, resulting in several injuries and the withdrawal of the attacked rebel factions from the battlefield. That government troops managed to repel the major rebel assault on the provincial capital stood in stark contrast to a string of setbacks they had suffered in previous months.

=== Interlude ===
As of 2 July, the rebels had failed to make any significant progress. Fighting was reported in the outskirts of Itman, in an attempt to cut the Syrian Army's supply route, with the Air Force conducting airstrikes and the Damascus-Daraa highway still fully held by the Syrian Army. The following day, it was reported that the lack of advances was due to the coordination between the Southern Front and the Army of Conquest in the area being hampered by a lack of cohesion. This stemmed from the FSA's First Army refusing to align itself with the al-Nusra Front. The Southern Front's spokesman stated that they sought to exclude al-Nusra from the offensive, which in turn caused al-Nusra to respond in kind, causing problems.

=== Attempted renewal of the offensive ===
On 8 July, the rebels reportedly renewed their offensive. However, as of 10 July, the rebels had failed to make much headway in the face of stiff resistance by the Army, backed up by heavy air strikes on rebel positions.

== Aftermath ==
On 13 August, the rebels took Tal Za'tar hill, near the western suburbs of the city, but it was reportedly recaptured by the Army the next day.
