= Abuzar Brigade =

Afghan Shia militia, 1980–1988

- لشکر ابوذر
- Dates active: 1980–1988
- Allegiance: Iran; IRGC
- Headquarters: Tehran and Mashhad, Iran
- Ideology: Khomeinism; Shia Islamism
- Size: (Unknown)
- Part of: Tehran Eight
- Wars: Soviet–Afghan War; Iran-Iraq War; Operation Samen-ol-A'emeh; Operation Tariq al-Qods; Operation Fath ol-Mobin; Liberation of Khorramshahr

The Abuzar Brigade (Persian: تیپ ابوذر Tyip Abozar, Arabic: لواء أبوزر Liwa' 'Abuzr), also known as the Abuzar Division (Persian: لشکر ابوذر Lashkar-e-Abuzar, Arabic: فرقة ابوذر Firqat Abuzar), was an Afghan Shia militia that fought in the Iran–Iraq War on the side of Iran.

== History ==
In the early years after the establishment of the Islamic Republic of Iran, Shia Afghan militias, collectively known as the Tehran Eight, fought against the Democratic Republic of Afghanistan and the Soviet Union's military which supported the DRA. During the Iran-Iraq War in the 1980s, they aligned themselves with the Islamic Revolutionary Guard Corps (IRGC) and sent fighters as part of the Abuzar Brigade to battle the Iraqis, suffering significant casualties throughout the conflict. During the Iran–Iraq war, fighters of the Abuzar Brigade were stationed in the mountainous areas of Northwestern Iran, as they had experience in mountain and irregular warfare from their war with the Soviets.

In 2014 the IRGC created the Liwa Fatemiyoun, a Shia Afghan militia formed to fight in Syria on the side of the government. It is funded, trained, and equipped by the Iranian Revolutionary Guards, and fights under the command of Iranian officers. However, the group has denied direct Iranian government involvement in its activities. According to late deputy commander Sayed Hakim, the group numbers between 12,000–14,000 fighters in 2017.
