= First Army (Syrian rebel group) =

- الجيش الأول; Jaysh al-Awal
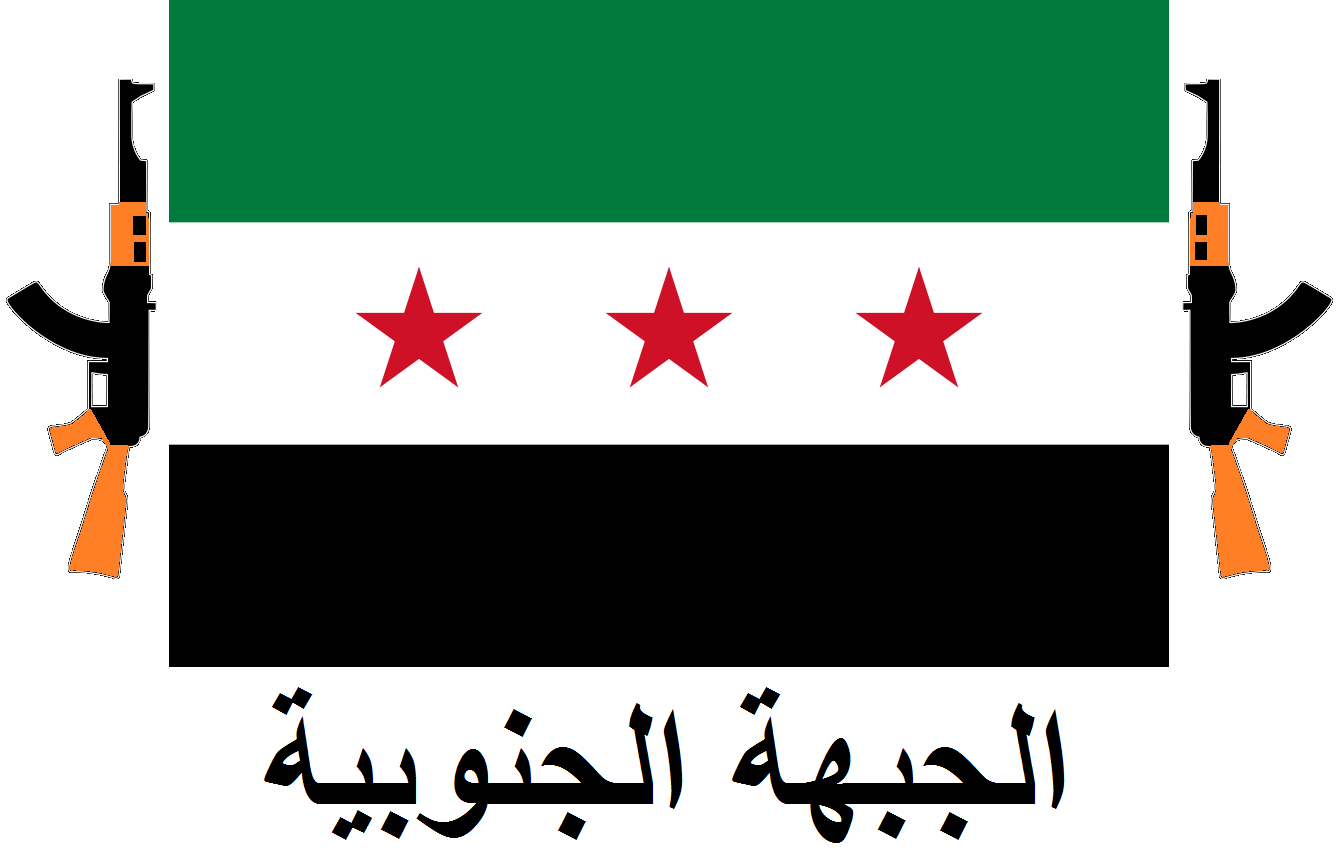
- Logo of the Southern Front
- Leader: Col. Saber Safar †
- Dates active: 1 January – July 2015
- Groups: Syria Revolutionaries Front; Coming Victory Brigade; 7th Division; Riyad al-Salehin Battalions of Damascus; Special Assignments Regiment of Damascus; Southern Swords Division; Hamza Division; 1st Artillery Regiment; 1st Assembly
- Active regions: Daraa Governorate; Quneitra Governorate
- Size: 5,000-10,000
- Part of: Free Syrian Army: Southern Front
- Wars: the Syrian Civil War

The First Army was a Syrian rebel group affiliated with the Free Syrian Army. It was created on 1 January 2015 in an effort to unify rebel ranks in southern Syria. Three prominent rebel units merged under this command structure. It operated as part of the Southern Front of the Free Syrian Army.

== History ==
During the 2015 Southern Syria offensive, the commander of the 1st Army, Colonel Saber Safar, was killed in action.

On 13 April 2015, it joined a number of other Southern Front affiliates in condemning the al-Nusra Front's ideology and discontinuing all forms of cooperation with it.

After the Daraa offensive (June–July 2015), the 1st Army disbanded and only the Hamza Division continues to use the name.

== See also ==
- List of armed groups in the Syrian Civil War
