= Holy Shrine Defender =

Phrase used by the Iranian government

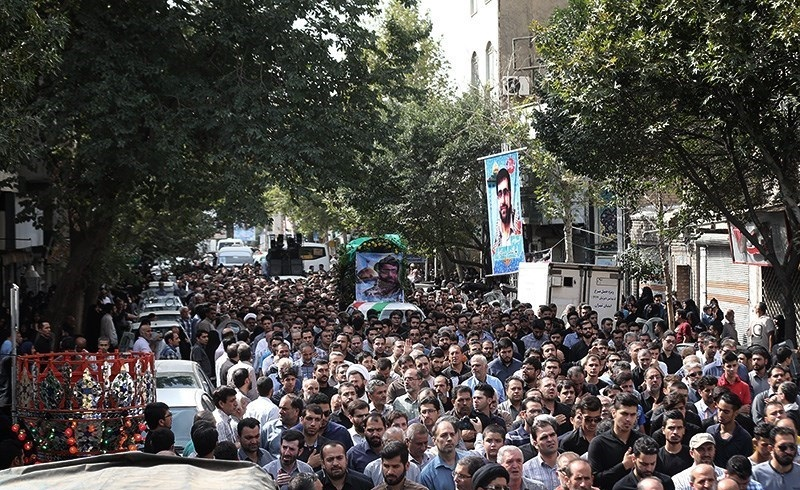
The funeral of Abolfazl Nikzad, a Holy Shrine Defenders member

Holy Shrine Defenders (Persian: مدافعان حرم; Modāfe'ān-e-Haram) is a phrase used by the Iranian government to refer to their advisers and military personnel (including foreign fighters) fighting in Iraq and formerly Syria in defense and protection of Shia peoples and holy shrines often targeted by Sunni fighters. The most prominent shrine associated with the mission of the "holy shrine defenders," and to which their presence in Syria was ostensibly dedicated, is the Sayyidah Zaynab Mosque in Damascus.

== Background ==
The term "holy shrine defender" refers to advisers and military personnel who fight on behalf of Iran to defend and protect Shia sites and peoples in Iraq and Syria from groups such as ISIS, and in support of the government of Bashar al-Assad in Syria. The term not only includes Iranians, but also Afghan and Pakistani fighters, such as those who fight with Liwa Fatemiyoun or Liwa Zainebiyoun.

According to Speaker of the Iranian Parliament Ali Larijani, the "holy shrine defenders" guarantee the "security, awareness and dignity of the Iranian people" by fighting against ISIS. The term itself begins to appear throughout Iranian media in 2013 in response to the perceived danger facing the Sayyidah Zaynab Mosque from Sunni rebels and an actual shelling of the shrine in July of that year.

"Holy shrine defenders" is meant to evoke the memory of the Iran–Iraq War, often referred to in Persian as the Holy Defense (دفاع مقدس defā'-e moqaddas), and can further be connected to those fighting on the frontlines against COVID-19 in Iran, known as "health defenders" (مدافعان سلامت modāfe'ān-e salāmat).

== Involvement in Syria and Sayyidah Zaynab Shrine ==
The Damascene shrine of Zaynab bint Ali, daughter of Ali ibn Abi Talib, the fourth caliph of Islam and first Imam of Shia Islam, features prominently in Iranian state narratives about the involvement of "holy shrine defenders" in Syria. Protection of the shrine from outside attack, and possible destruction, has been used as a key mobilizing tactic for the Iranian state to attract Shia forces from across the region, especially those in Afghanistan who lived under Taliban rule. Hezbollah has claimed the threats against the shrine are what motivated it to send fighters to Syria and Secretary General Hassan Nasrallah has called protecting the shrine "a duty".

Despite the clear political aim of "holy shrine defenders" and other Iranian proxies to support the Assad government in Syria, the justification to be in Syria in order to protect and defend the shrine is not without merit. In April 2013, reports emerged that Al-Nusra Front, associated with Al-Qaeda in Syria, disinterred the dead body of Hujr ibn 'Adi and threatened to repeat this action at Zaynab bint Ali ’s shrine.

Protecting the Sayyidah Zaynab Shrine features heavily in the experiences of "holy shrine defenders." Forces entering Syria often stop at Zaynab's shrine after first arriving and stop there before departing. It also serves as a prominent site for "holy shrine defenders" to participate in Ashura and Arba‘ein commemorations.

== Recognition and promotion in Iran ==
In Iran, "holy shrine defenders" are recognized by the state as martyrs for their role in defending both Shia Islam and the Islamic Republic. They are often given official funeral processions, sometimes coinciding with the death anniversary of a Shia Imam or alongside martyrs from the Iran–Iraq War, and buried in the designated martyr's section in cemeteries.

Those "holy shrine defenders" who have been designated as martyrs are often depicted in funerary posters and other visual iconography, perhaps none more so than Mohsen Hojaji. Hojaji's status as an iconic martyr of the "holy shrine defenders" can be seen in the multitude of depictions, such as those appearing on the billboard at Tehran's Vali Asr Square, which seek to relate his image and death on the battlefield to the events occurring at the Battle of Karbala.

Other symbols related to the designated mission of the "holy shrine defenders," namely the Sayyidah Zaynab Mosque in Damascus, also feature heavily in iconography sponsored by the Islamic Republic and are used to create connections between current events and Shia history. Relating the experiences of Karbala to contemporary events has been an ongoing feature of state-sponsored narratives of national identity and belonging in the Islamic Republic, especially when faced with crisis.

== Subgroups ==
- Liwa Fatemiyoun
- Hezbollah
- Liwa Zainebiyoun
- Badr Organization
- / Kata'ib Hezbollah
- / Liwa Abu al-Fadhal al-Abbas
- Asa'ib Ahl al-Haq
- Harakat Hezbollah al-Nujaba
- Liwa Assad Allah al-Ghalib fi al-Iraq wa al-Sham
- Kata'ib al-Imam Ali
- Liwa al-Baqir
- / Quds Force

== See also ==
- Shia Crescent
- Axis of Resistance
- Khan Tuman (operation)
