= Hamza Division (Daraa) =

- فرقة الحمزة; Firqat al-Hamza
- Syrian opposition flag used by the Hamza Division
- Leader: Col. Saber Safar
- Dates active: 8 April 2013 – 31 July 2018
- Groups: Hauran Mujahideen Brigade; Engineering Battalion
- Headquarters: Inkhil, Syria
- Active regions: Daraa Governorate; Quneitra Governorate
- Part of: Free Syrian Army: Southern Front; Daraa Military Council (former); First Army (inactive)
- Wars: the Syrian civil war

The Hamza Division (Arabic: فرقة الحمزة; Firqat al-Hamza) was a Syrian rebel group affiliated with the Free Syrian Army. It was based in Inkhil, Daraa Governorate. It was formed on 8 April 2013 by Colonel Saber Safar as the "Hamza Brigade". It was composed of six subunits. The group received U.S.-made BGM-71 TOW anti-tank missiles. It was a member of the Daraa Military Council and the Southern Front.

== History ==
The group joined the First Army on 1 January 2015. In mid-2015 the 1st Army disbanded, although the Hamza Division continued to use its imagery until 2016.

On 22 September 2016, 9 commanders in the Hamza Division were assassinated in a bombing in Inkhil.

== See also ==
- List of armed groups in the Syrian Civil War
