= Sayyida Zaynab Mosque, Syria =

Twelver Shi'ite mosque and mausoleum in al-Sitt, Syria

Sayyida Zaynab Mosque
- مسجد السيدة زينب
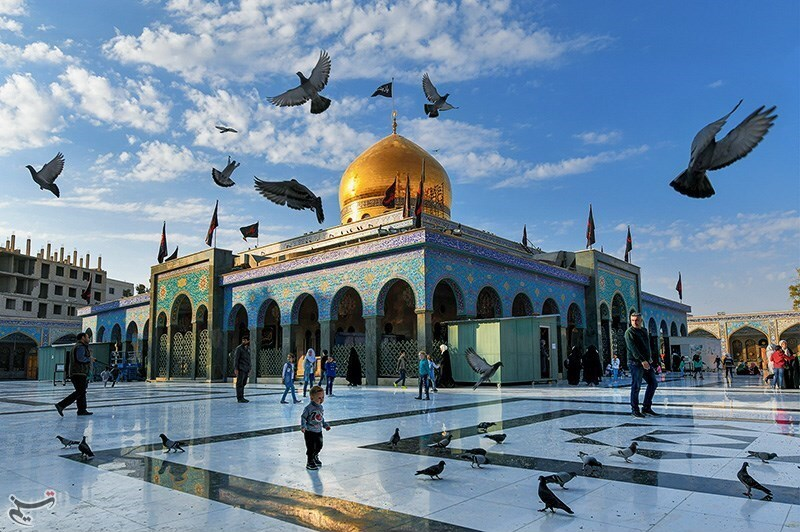
- The mausoleum of Zaynab bint Ali

- Location of the mosque in Syria

Religion
- Affiliation: Shia Islam
- Ecclesiastical or organisational status: Mosque and mausoleum
- Status: Active

Location
- Location: Sayyidah Zaynab, Rif Dimashq Governorate
- Country: Syria
- Interactive map of Sayyida Zaynab Mosque
- Coordinates: 33°26′40″N 36°20′27″E

Architecture
- Architect: Rida Mourtada
- Type: Islamic architecture
- Completed: 1990

Specifications
- Dome: One
- Minaret: Two
- Shrines: One (Zaynab bint Ali; according to Twelver Shi'ite tradition)

The Sayyida Zaynab Mosque (Arabic: مَسْجِد ٱلسَّيِّدَة زَيْنَب, romanized: Masjid as-Sayyidah Zaynab) is a Shia mosque located in Sayyidah Zaynab near the capital city of Damascus, Syria. Twelver Shia tradition considers the mosque to contain the mausoleum of Zaynab bint Ali, the daughter of Ali and Fatima, sister of Hasan and Husayn, and grand-daughter of the Islamic prophet Muhammad. It is a holy site in Shia Islam.

Sunni and Isma'ili Shia tradition considers the mosque of the same name in Cairo, Egypt, to be Zaynab's tomb. The shrine is a centre of Shia religious studies in Syria and a destination of mass pilgrimage by Twelver Shia Muslims from across the Muslim world, beginning in the 1980s. The zenith of visitation normally occurs in the summer. The present-day mosque that hosts the tomb was built in 1990.

== Architecture ==
The building of the shrine consists of a large sahn with a square plan. It included a dome and two high minarets. The minarets and walls of the courtyard and porches were tiled by Iranian artists, the roof and walls of the shrine were glazed from the inside and the dome was gilded from the outside. On the eastern side of the courtyard, the building of the Zeinabieh's prayer hall with a small courtyard has been built. A new courtyard has also recently been built on the north side of the Holy Shrine. The shrine is sometimes seen by some as a place of miracles.

The shrine has been managed by Mourtada's family (Arabic: آلُ مُرْتَضَى, romanized: Āl Murtaḍā) since the fourteenth century. Financially, the shrine has been funded mainly by the Iranian government following 1979. Given their financial investment, the ideological direction of the shrine and the prayer hall follow Ayatollah Khamanei. The Lebanese Hezbollah displays several posters and sets at the shrine.

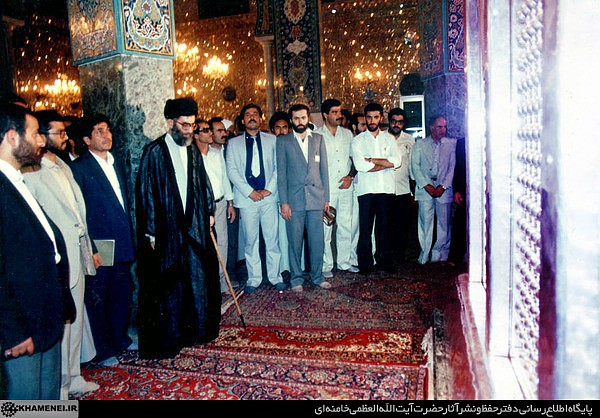
Iranian President Ali Khamenei visiting the shrine of Sayyida Zaynab in 1984

Several Shia scholars and celebrities such as Seyyed Mohsen Amin Ameli, and Seyyed Hossein Yousef Maki Ameli are buried in the shrine of Sayyidah Zainab and the surrounding cemeteries. Ali Shariati, an ideologue of the Iranian Revolution, had wished before his death, to be buried in the yard of Zaynab bint Ali, the descendant of Muhammad and beloved daughter of Imam Ali. His shrine is found within the compound of Sayyidah Zaynab Mosque and is regularly visited by many Iranian pilgrims.

== Recent history ==
On 27 September 2008, a car bomb attack took place on the intersection leading up to the mosque, killing 17 people.

On 14 June 2012, the town became the target of a suicide car bomb attack where around 14 people were heavily wounded.

Since mid-summer 2012, the town has been under attack from armed militants in neighbouring Sunni towns. Many Shia and pro-government families were driven out of their homes in southern Damascus and sought refuge in Sayyidah Zaynab. Constant shelling became more frequent in this predominantly Shia town, and rockets landing on random places in the town became common.

=== 2016 bombings ===
On 31 January 2016, at least 70 people were killed in three bomb blasts in the Koa sodhda area, near the shrine. At least another 110 people were also wounded in the blasts, caused car bombs.

On 21 February 2016, over 130 people were killed in another series of bombings, less than a month after the January attacks, and 180 people were injured.

=== 2017 bombings ===
On 12 March 2017, Hay'at Tahrir al-Sham claimed responsibility for the explosion of a roadside bomb and a suicide bombing at the shrine. The twin attacks killed 74 people according to the Syrian Observatory for Human Rights, the majority of whom were Iraqi pilgrims. Hay'at Tahrir al-Sham described the attack as a "message to Iran".

=== 2023 bombings ===
On 27 July 2023, a motorcycle detonated near a taxi at Kou Sudan Street near Sayyida Zaynab's Shrine, killing at least six people and injuring another 23.

=== Hezbollah withdrawal ===
To maintain security, the Shia Lebanese militant group Hezbollah's Syrian branch guarded the site until they were withdrawn before the fall of Damascus in December 2024.

== Gallery ==
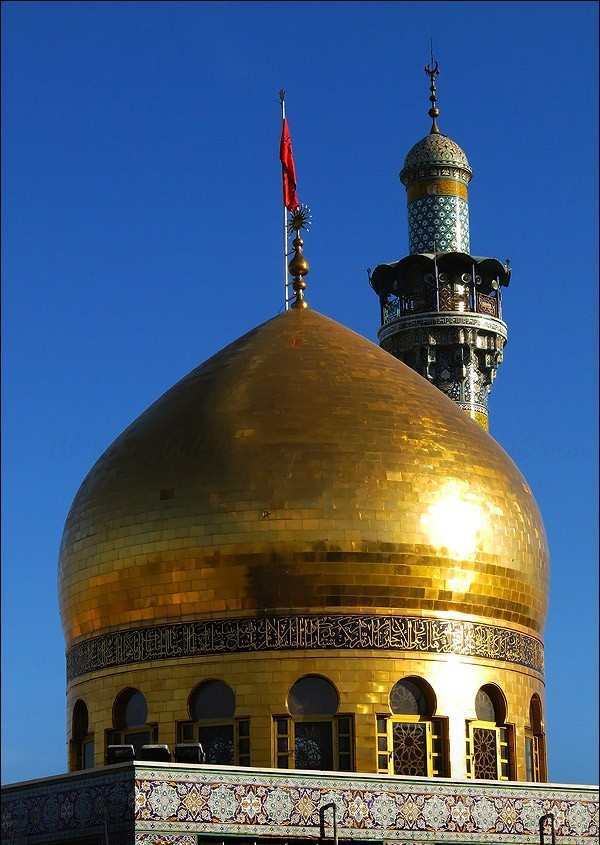
The golden dome above the mausoleum

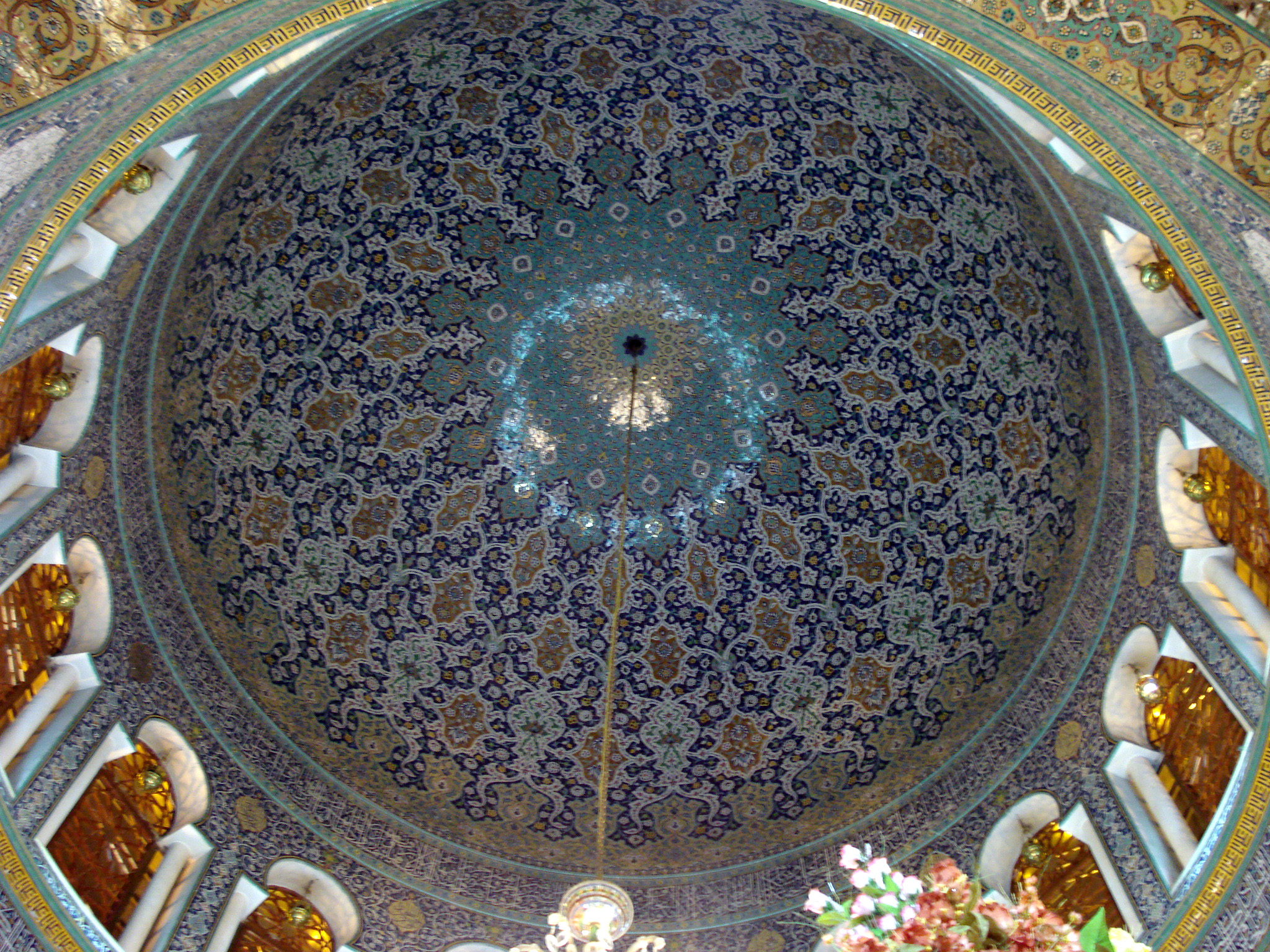
Arabesques on the inside of the dome

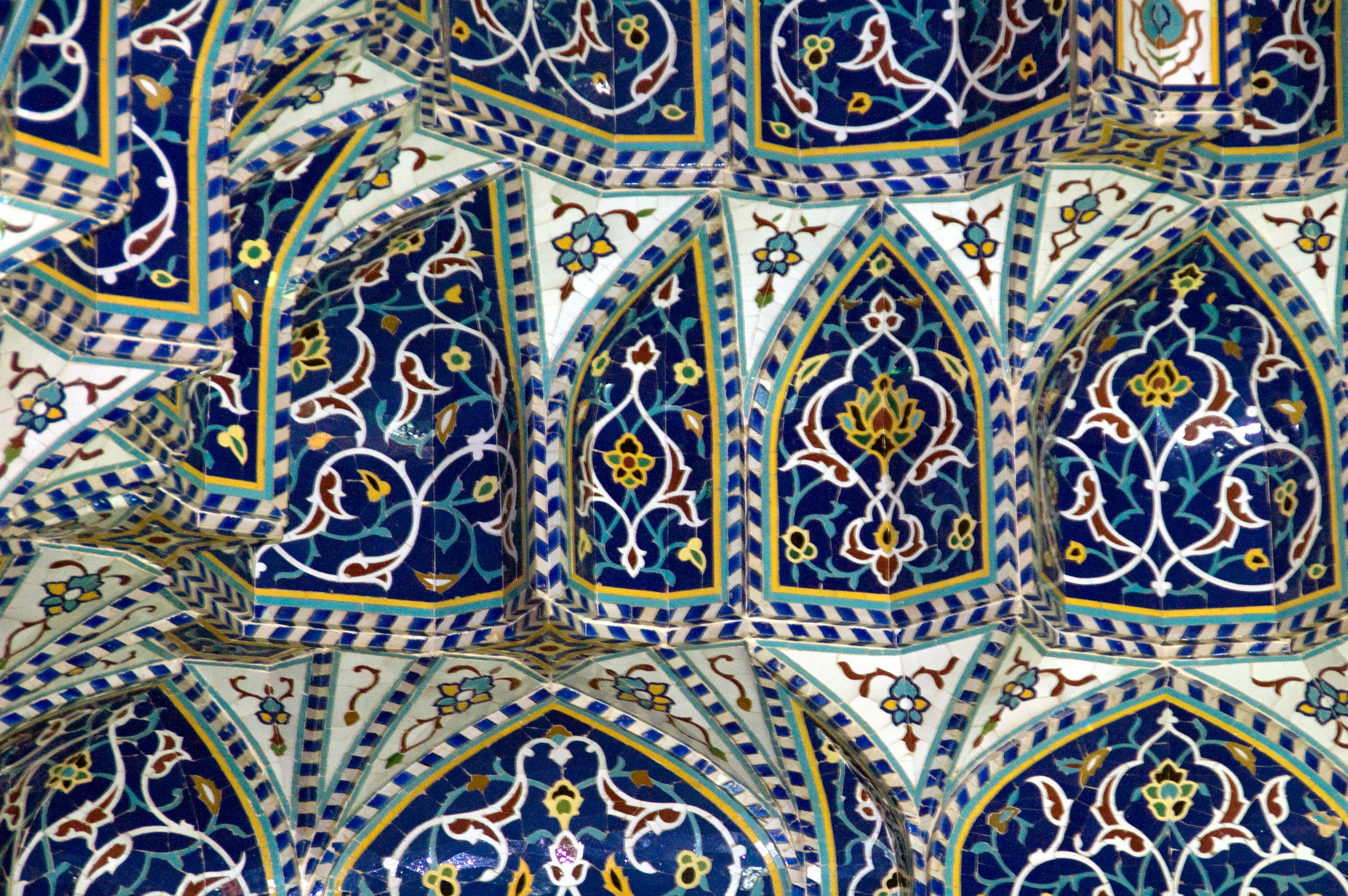
Muqarnas decorated with arabesques inside the mosque

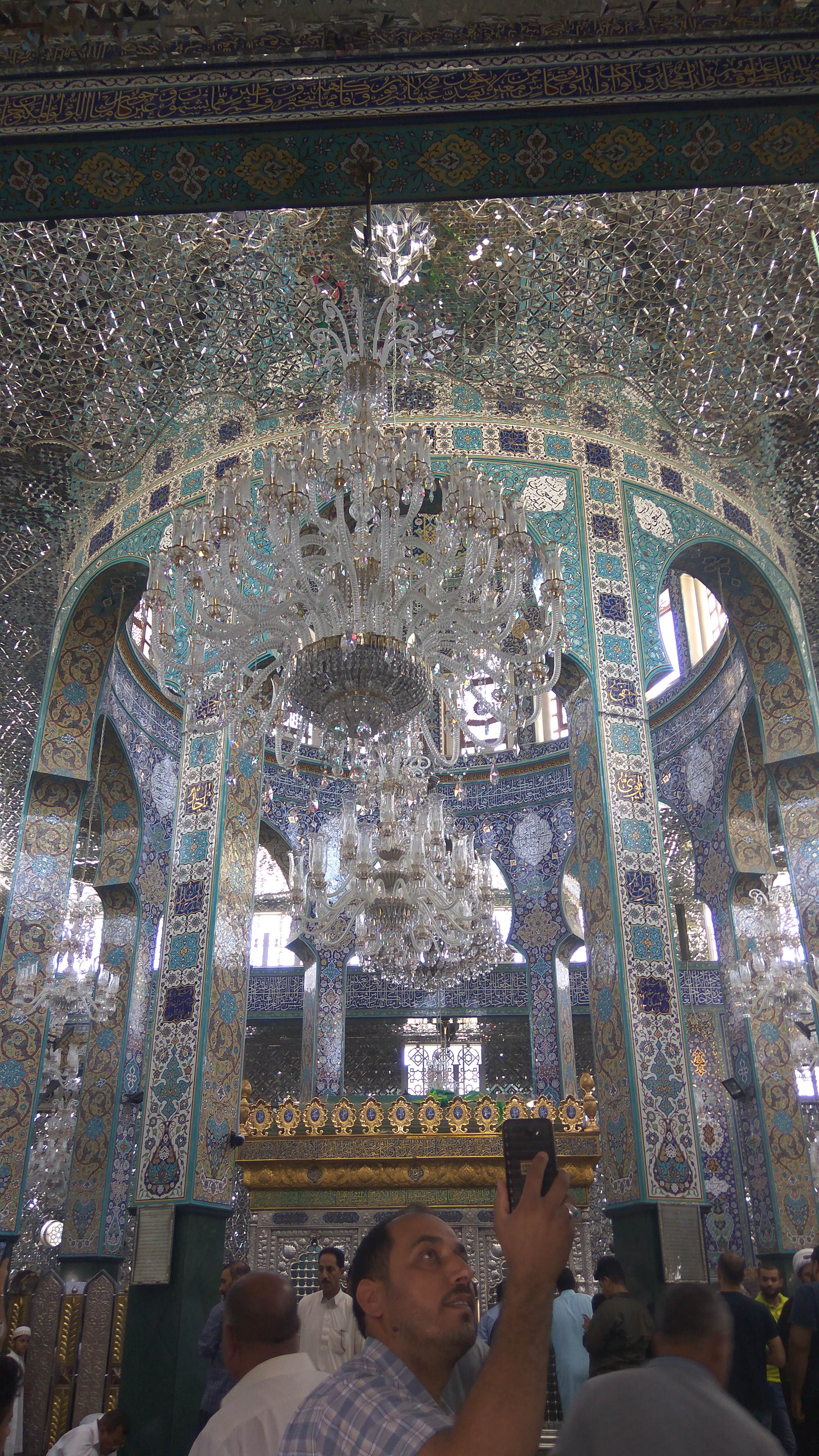
Interior decoration of Sayyida Zainab mosque

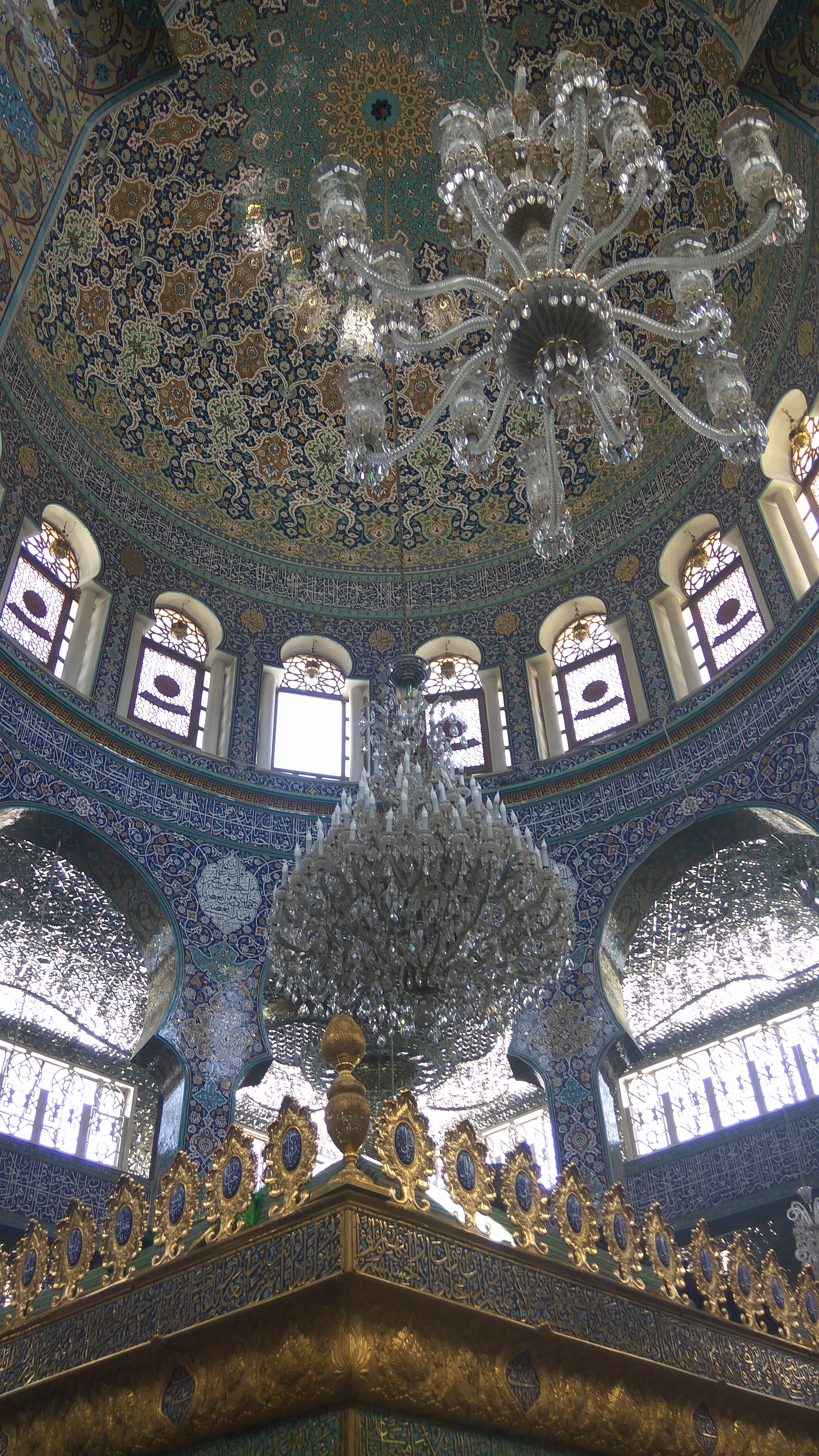
Dome interior above the mausoleum

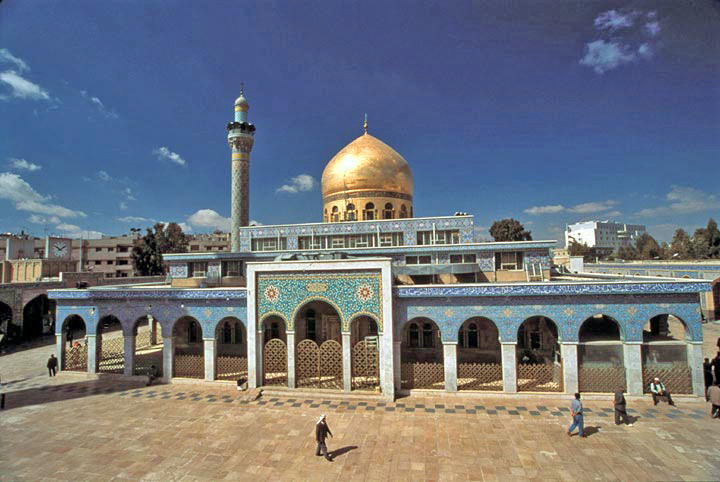

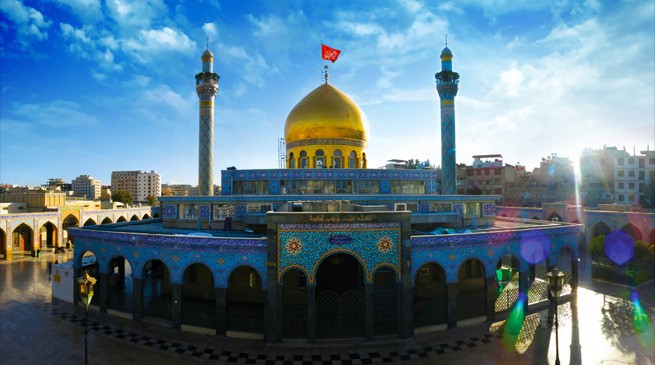

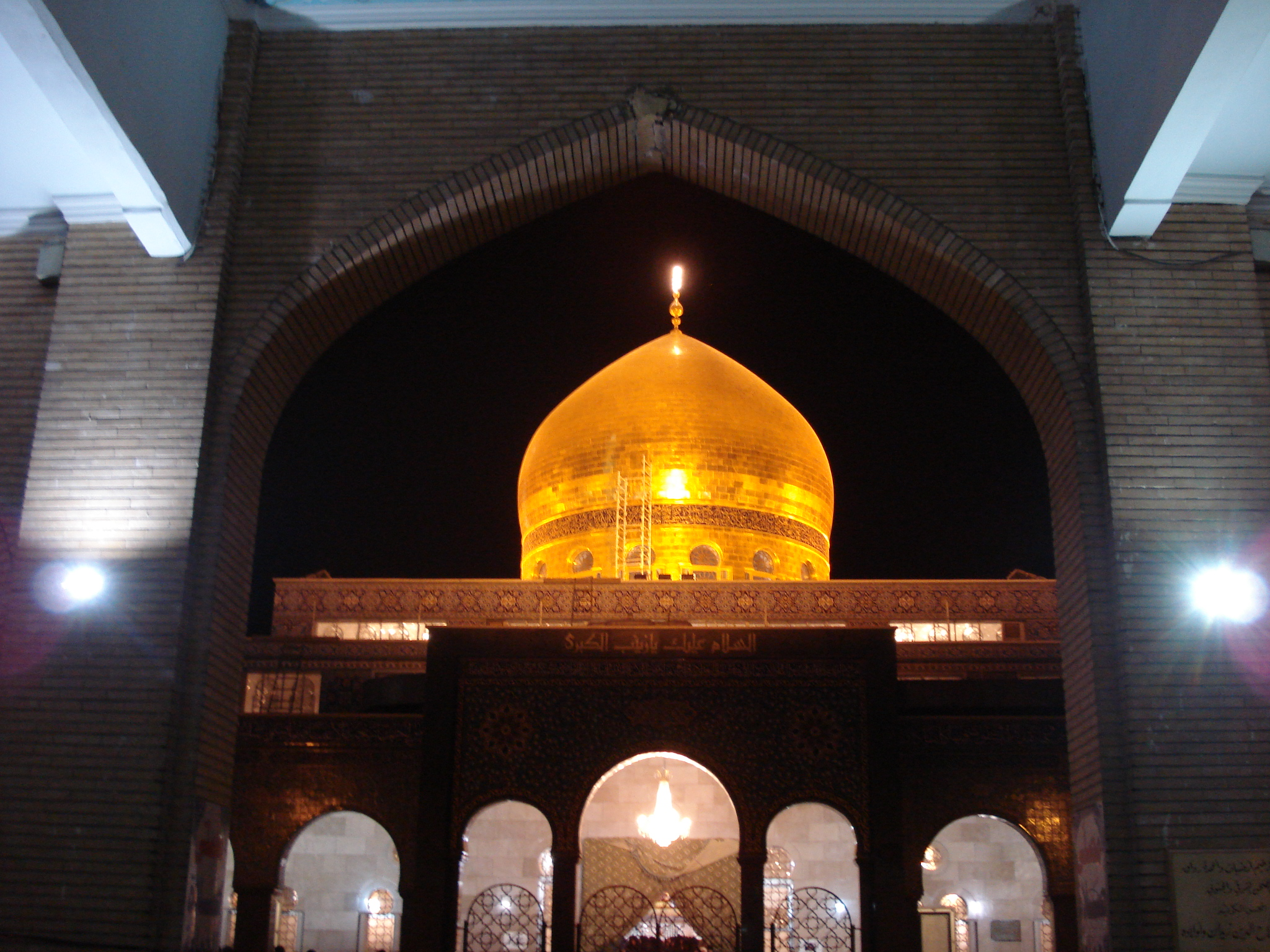

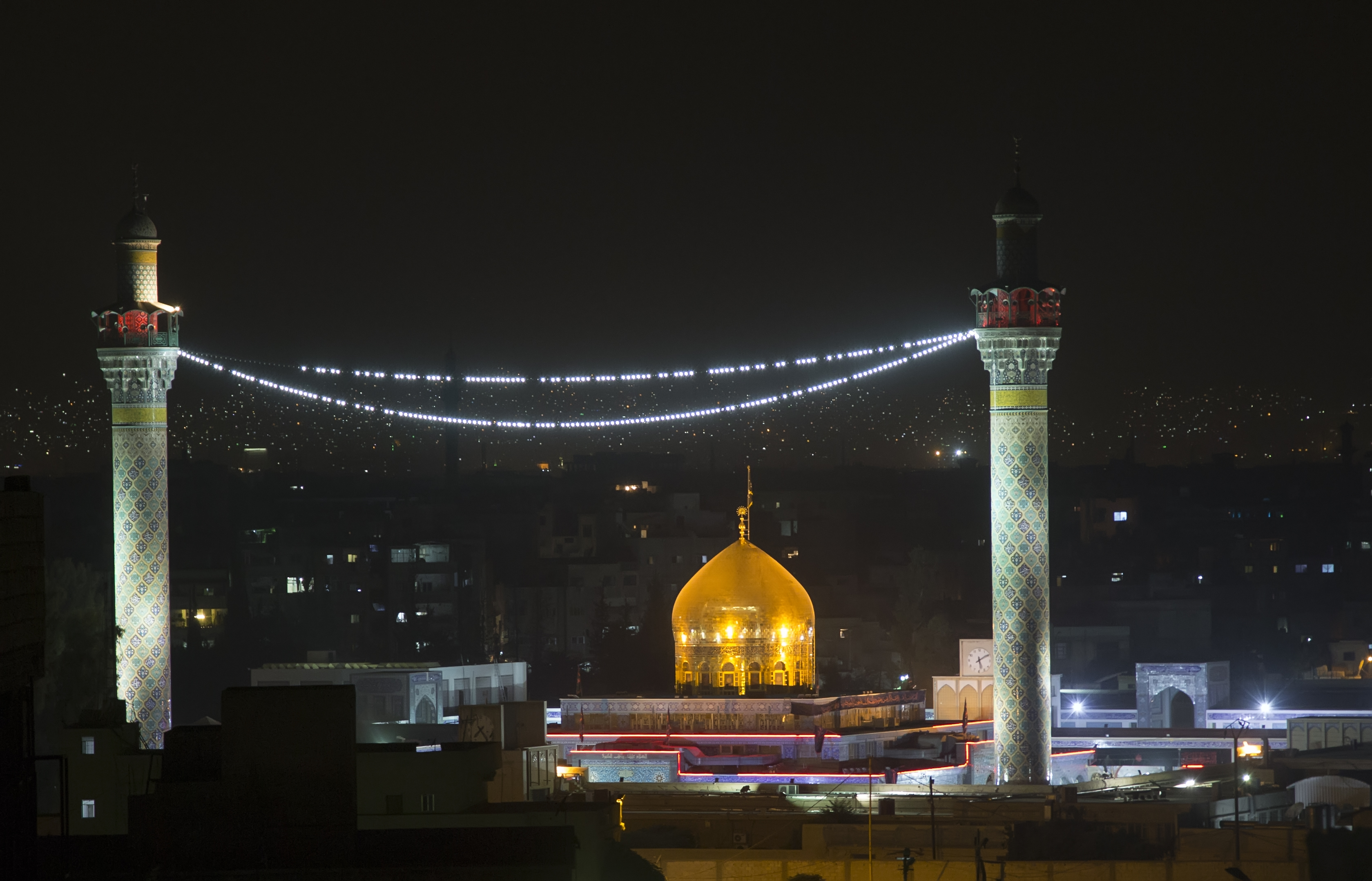

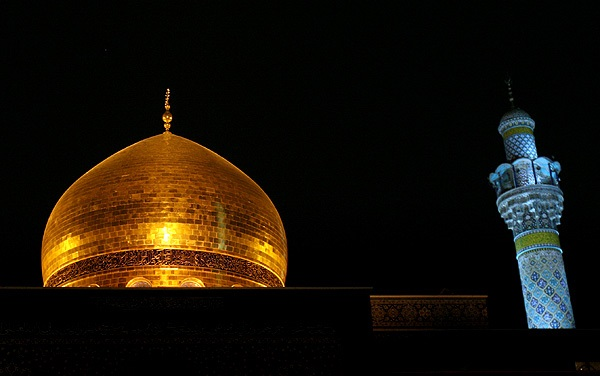

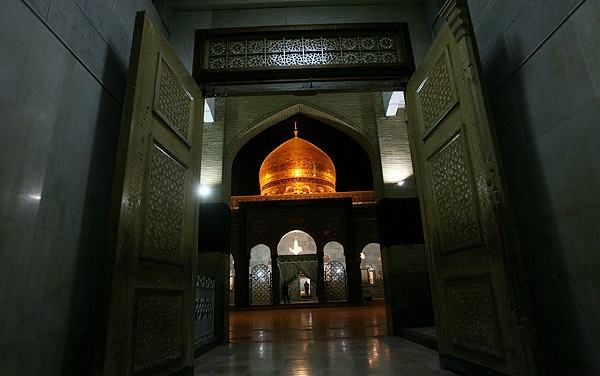

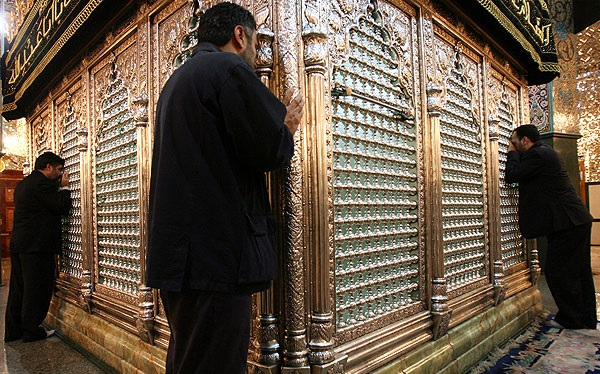

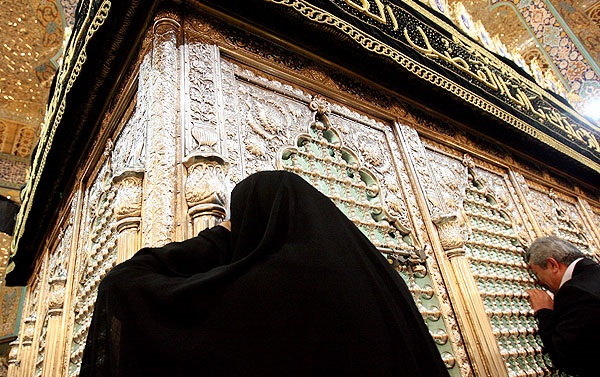

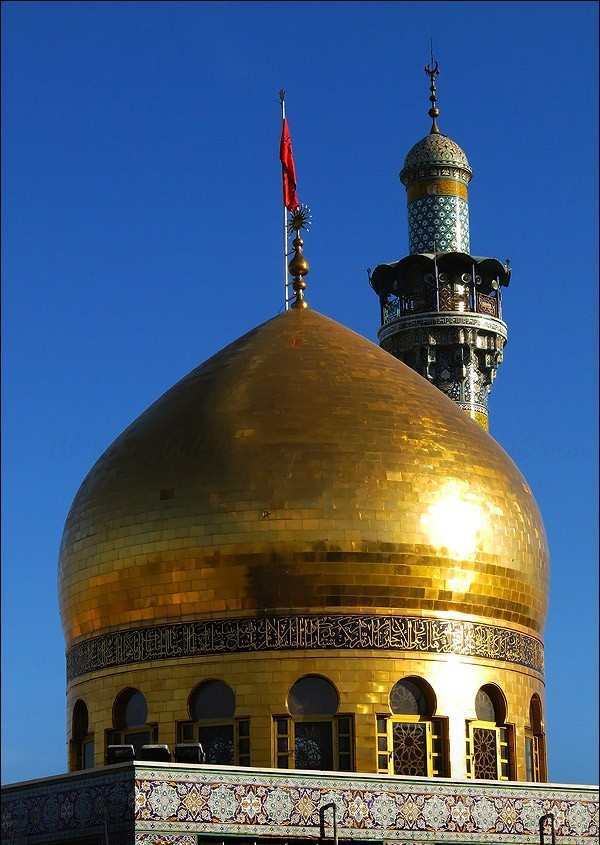

== See also ==
- Shia Islam in Syria
- List of mosques in Syria
- Holiest sites in Shia Islam
