= Fursan al-Joulan =

Faction of the Free Syrian Army

Knights of the Golan Brigade
- فرسان الجولان; Fursan al-Joulan
- Logo of Fursan al-Joulan
- Leaders: Abu Suhaib al-Joulani (Abu Asad); Moaz Nassar; Khaled Nassar (Abu Rateb)
- Founded: 10 October 2014
- Headquarters: Jubata al-Khashab
- Active regions: Quneitra Governorate
- Size: 300-1000
- Part of: (Syria) Free Syrian Army
- Wars: the Syrian Civil War
- Website: Official Facebook page

Liwaa’ Fursan al-Joulan (Arabic: فرسان الجولان, lit. 'Knights of the Golan Brigade') was a Free Syrian Army faction based in Jubata al-Khashab, a Quneitra town in the United Nations Disengagement Observer Force (UNDOF) zone.

== Members and leadership ==
It was led by Abu Suhaib al-Joulani, of whom Assad's government officials and Lebanese sources identified as Ahmed Mukhaiber al-Khatib, nicknamed "Abu Asad", from the town of Masharah. The group consisted of between 300 and 400 local fighters according to a Southern Front source, or 1,000 fighters according to Assad's government officials. It was described as a "local" rebel group, "non-Islamist" and was independent from the Southern Front (the main Free Syrian Army group in the area).

== Israeli support and role in southern Syria ==
=== Israeli backing and motive ===
The group was among many Syrian opposition groups which received direct Israeli support of humanitarian aid, medical treatments, logistical support and military transfers which included assault rifles, machine guns, mortar launchers and transport vehicles. Israel also transferred cash in the form of salaries of $75 per fighter, alongside additional funds for procuring weapons locally. A source quoted by Aymenn Jawad al-Tamimi claimed that Israel was providing humanitarian aid to Syrians in coordination with the group, including water pumps, medical supplies and cash for fuel. A bakery was built in the group's town with the help of Israel. It fed 60,000 people in rebel-held areas in southwestern Syria. In 2017, the group's leader, Abu Suhaib told The Wall Street Journal that he receives approximately $5,000 a month from Israel and the group's spokesman, Moatasem al-Golani, was quoted as saying: "Israel stood by our side in a heroic way. We wouldn’t have survived without Israel’s assistance".

The Israeli backing of the group, alongside its support of other Syrian opposition factions, such as Firqat Ahrar Nawa, Saif al-Sham Brigade, Jaysh al-Ababil, Al-Ezz bin Abdul Salam Brigade, Omar Bin Al-Khattab Brigade, Jaydour Horan Brigade, Al-Haramein Battalion, Alwiya al-Furqan, Syrian Revolutionaries Front, Jabhat Ansar al-Islam, Al-Ahrar Gathering, Abu Amara Brigades and others, was part of a broader Israeli effort to establish a buffer zone along the Israeli-occupied Golan Heights and to deter Iranian and Hezbollah influence in the region.

=== Role in fighting ===
On 19 April 2017, Al-Akhbar reported the recent weeks have experienced several skirmishes between Al-Nusra Front and Fursan al-Joulan in Qahtaniyah and the destroyed city of Quneitra, after Al-Nusra Front sensed the expansion of Fursan al-Joulan in those areas.

On 19 July 2018, violent clashes erupted in Quneitra region after the group rejected the deal of evacuation to Idlib of which the opposition reached with the Syrian government. Syrian activists circulated a voice recording which was sent by a Russian officer to the group, in which he threateningly told them: "I warn you if you do not stop shooting at the bulldozer, we will strike at your positions. We agreed with the Israelis. I personally will ride this turquoise and move it. I just spoke with Tel Aviv. I ask you very quickly to stop the shooting". A military source told Al Modon that the group's leader, Abu Suhaib, hoped to reach an agreement with the Russian side, similar to the agreement that was concluded by the former leader of the opposition factions in Beit Jann, Ayad Kamal, nicknamed "Moro", after an Israeli insistence on his survival as a local force that ensures the protection of the borders.

=== Border guard ===
On 21 July 2018, Al Quds Al Arabi reported that after negotiation with Israel, the group and two other militias joined to form the Israeli-led Southern Army on the southern border of Syria in the demilitarized zone in order to ensure the removal of Iranian forces. The group was expected to have around 2,000 members.

On 22 July 2018, it was reported that the group remained in the region with an understanding between Russia and Israel to act as a border guard force. Haaretz reported that the group coordinated with Israel the evacuation of 800 White Helmets members. In addition, pro-government sources reported that two commanders of the group, Moaz Nassar and Abu Rateb, had fled to Israel.

=== 2019 skirmish with Israel ===
On 24 January 2019, the IDF spokesperson, Avichay Adraee reported the following: "During the hours of last night, IDF forces operating in an isolated enclave near the border fence with Syria detected gunfire directed at them. The fighters returned fire. There were no casualties among our forces". Private sources told to Syria TV that an Israeli force entered the Al-Shahar camp, located west of the town of Jubata al-Khashab in the northern countryside of Quneitra, at 1:30 a.m. on Thursday and surrounded the house of Jalal Bakr, a former fighter of Fursan al-Joulan. After the Israeli force surrounded Bakr's house and asked him to surrender, the latter and his brothers living next to him began to clash with the force, thinking that it belonged to the regime forces. At the sound of the clash in the camp, the civilian "Ali Okasha", who owns a poultry farm located near the camp, came out with his weapon, which led to him being targeted and killed by the Israeli force. Israeli soldiers opened fire indiscriminately as they withdrew from the camp, injuring 3 civilians.

In conjunction, a private source told Hurriyat Press that "a patrol of the occupation army consisting of 11 soldiers entered the house of Jalal Bakr, who works with the Israeli army, in order to guide them to people who are wanted by the Israeli army and the locations of the activities of the Lebanese Hezbollah militia in the area." The source added that "when the occupation soldiers knocked on the door of Jalal Bakr's house, the latter thought that the patrol belonged to the Assad regime, so he fired in the air asking for help from his relatives in the town, after which clashes broke out between the residents and the occupation patrol for half an hour before the latter withdrew towards the Israeli-controlled Golan Heights after the ranks among the Israeli army were wounded." "Many of the town's residents joined the Lebanese Hezbollah militia after Assad's forces took control of southern Syria," the source said, noting that the incident took place in full view of Assad's forces, who remained silent and did not intervene, despite clashes taking place in areas under their control.

=== Commander's visit to Israel ===
On 4 October 2019, STEP News Agency's correspondent in southern Syria, Raji al-Qassim, reported that the former military commander of Fursan al-Joulan, Khaled Nassar, nicknamed "Abu Rateb", returned to Jubata al-Khashab after he entered Israeli territory for treatment before the recent battles in northern Syria about a year and three months ago. The correspondent continued by saying that Nassar has not returned from Israel for the past period, but returned about a week ago, with the aim of conducting a settlement process with the Syrian regime and that he held meetings with officers affiliated with the Sa'sa Military Security Branch.

== Killing of founder in Venezuela ==
On 19 November 2024, the leader and founder of the Fursan al-Joulan, Moaz Nassar, was killed by unknown assailants at his workplace in Venezuela, South America. Enab Baladi's correspondent in Quneitra reported that mosques in the town of Jubata al-Khashab broadcast the news of Nassar's death and called for funeral prayers. According to Moaz Nassar's relatives, he was living in Venezuela with his family, and worked in a restaurant with his son Suhaib, and he was killed after unknown assailants stormed the restaurant where he works and shot him directly in the morning. A Nassar's relative, who lives in Quneitra, added that Nassar left Syria in mid-2018, after the regime and Russia took control of the region as part of the "settlement" agreement that took place in southern Syria at the time. The relative added that Nassar evacuated from Syria to Israel with his family along with other leaders of the opposition factions, and settled in Israel for about two years, but left after he refused Israeli citizenship, and then settled in Venezuela.

== Attempted reconstitution by Israel ==
In May 2025, tribal sources from the Quneitra countryside area told Al-Akhbar that officers from the Israeli army contacted the remnants of Fursan al-Joulan in an attempt to reconstitute it under the name of the "Popular Protection Committees", whose mission will be to oppose any presence of the new Syrian government forces in the vicinity of the town, in preparation for redrawing contact lines on the ground. In conjunction, Eram News reported that Israel began to establish a military separation wall in southern Syria through a new military unit known as the "Eastern Division", which includes factions and elements of collaborators in the southern Syria. Local source in Daraa confirmed to Eram News that that Israel has begun contacting some figures from Fursan al-Joulan, which was active in the town of Jubata al-Khashab, in addition to figures from Hermon Regiment (formerly Omar Bin Al-Khattab Brigade) which controls the Beit Jinn area - both factions of whom Israel previously cooperated with during the era of the Assad's regime, and of which now Israel is trying to annex them into the "Eastern Division".

According to Al-Manar, the Israeli army, tried to revive Fursan al-Joulan, starting from the village of Taranja in Quneitra, specifically a month after the fall of Assad regime, where it exercised an intelligence role accompanied by search campaigns for the village and stripping its people of the most basic weapons, including hunting rifles, which put the residents in a state of double anxiety as a result of the imposed security reality. Al-Manar's source pointed out that "the process of reviving the aforementioned brigade was not limited to opening channels between intermediaries of the new administration represented by the General Security and Israel, but some of its elements today were formerly members of it after the outbreak of events in Syria, and Israel has now worked to finance them after the fall of the regime, which indicates the creation of new lines of contact with the Syrian government, which will itself be part of the path of drawing it, as long as it undertakes to remove any danger from Israel's borders, and provide the requirements for the buffer zone".

== See also ==
- South Lebanon Army
- Southern Syria clashes (July 2025–present)
- Other Israeli-supported Syrian rebel groups:
  - Southern Army (Syria)
  - Firqat Ahrar Nawa
  - Saif al-Sham Brigade
  - Jaysh al-Ababil
  - Omar Bin Al-Khattab Brigade
  - Al-Ezz bin Abdul Salam
  - Al-Haramein Battalion
  - Jaydour Horan Brigade
  - Alwiya al-Furqan
  - Syrian Revolutionaries Front
  - Jabhat Ansar al-Islam
  - Al-Ahrar Gathering
  - Abu Amara Brigades
  - Al-Nusra Front#Relations with Israel
