= Syrian Revolutionaries Front =

Syrian rebel alliance

- جبهة ثوار سوريا
- Logo of the SRF
- Leaders: Jamal Maarouf (overall leader, northern branch); Col. Afif Suleiman (Idlib commander, resigned July 2014); Maj. Abu Osama al-Jolani (southern branch); Brig. Gen. Yahya al-Abdi (63rd Southern Division); Capt. Abu Hamza al-Naimi † (southern branch)
- Dates active: December 2013 – 5 May 2015 (main Idlib and Aleppo branch); December 2013 – 31 July 2018 (southern branch)
- Headquarters: Quneitra Governorate, Syria
- Active regions: Daraa Governorate, Quneitra Governorate, Rif Dimashq Governorate, and Damascus Governorate, Syria
- Ideology: Non-ideological (overall group): Islamic democracy (majority of groups); Secularism (some groups)
- Size: 10,000–15,000 (2014); 7,000 (2016)
- Part of: (Syrian opposition) Free Syrian Army: Southern Front; Southern Alliance
- Wars: the Syrian Civil War

The Syrian Revolutionaries Front (Arabic: جبهة ثوار سوريا, Jabhat Thowar Suriya, SRF, also translated Syrian Rebel Front) was an alliance of 14 relatively moderate religious and some secular armed groups fighting under the banner of the Free Syrian Army, formed in December 2013, thus according to Arutz Sheva (an Israeli media network) further sidelining the FSA and its leadership Supreme Military Council. It was established as a response to the merger of Islamist Syrian rebels into the Islamic Front.

The group was known to receive Israeli support alongside several other Syrian opposition factions such as Fursan al-Joulan, Firqat Ahrar Nawa, Jaysh al-Ababil, Jaydour Horan Brigade, Al-Ezz bin Abdul Salam Brigade, Omar Bin Al-Khattab Brigade, Al-Haramein Battalion, Alwiya al-Furqan, Saif al-Sham Brigade, Jabhat Ansar al-Islam, Ahrar Gathering and others.

== History ==
=== Northern branch ===
In December 2013, following initial clashes, the Islamic Front and the Syrian Revolutionaries Front agreed to reconcile. The coalition was spearheaded by Jamal Maarouf, head of the Syrian Martyrs' Brigades, largest member group of the SRF based in Jabal Zawiya, Idlib Governorate. The group has supported the Geneva II Middle East peace conference that is aimed at resolving the Syrian civil war. The group received financial support from Saudi Arabia, while the United States has reportedly given the group only non-lethal aid like food, medicine and blankets, in part due to concerns over its involvement in smuggling and extortion.

100 members of the SRF's Wolves of al-Ghab Brigade were killed in clashes with al-Qaeda's al-Nusra Front near Jisr al-Shughur on 16 July 2014.

In late October 2014 clashes erupted again between the SRF and al-Nusra in the Jabal al-Zawiya region of Idlib, over the following days, dozens of SRF fighters defected to Nusra and the group lost control of numerous villages as they withdrew their forces from the region. Maarouf and some of his followers relocated to Turkey, however around half of his men in the region remained behind and accepted the change of control rather than fight.

On 5 May 2015, some of the former members of the Hazzm Movement, the Syria Revolutionaries Front based in the north, Jabhat al-Akrad, the Dawn of Freedom Brigades and smaller FSA groups formed the Army of Revolutionaries. Many of their northern members also dissolved into the Levant Front.

During the Turkish military intervention in Syria which started in late August 2016, some members of the Syrian Revolutionaries Front and the Hazm Movement in exile from Turkey crossed into Syria through Jarabulus.

==== Northern groups (now defunct) ====
- Syrian Martyrs' Brigades
- Idlib Martyrs' Brigade
- Ansar Brigades
- Wolves of al-Ghab Brigade
- Free North Brigade
- Northern Farouq Battalions
- Hama Farouq Battalions
- 9th Special Forces Division of Aleppo (left in January 2014 to join the Hazzm Movement)
- Union of Free Zawiya Brigades (left in May 2014 to join the Syrian Salvation Front)
  - Al-Qa'qa' Brigade (expelled in May 2014 and joined the Syrian Salvation Front)
- Idlib Military Council (dissolved in June 2014)
- Khalid ibn al-Walid Brigade (left in July 2014)
- Mountain Hawks Brigade (left to join the 5th Corps in September 2014)
- Syrian Kurdish Revolutionary Council (Komala) (left in October 2014)

=== Southern branch ===
The group is currently only active in southern Syria, as a member of a Southern Front group, and previously part of the First Army of the Southern Front. On 2 March 2016, a car bomb explosion targeted the SRF headquarters in Quneitra and killed its commander Captain Abu Hamza al-Naimi and 4 other field commanders. Some time in 2016, the SRF's branch in Jubata al-Khashab split into 3 factions. The local SRF commander in the area also defected to the Golan Regiment.

On 6 April 2017, clashes erupted between the SRF and Jabhat Ansar al-Islam in the northern Quneitra countryside, which resulted in 7 rebels being killed. Government forces shelled the area on the same day, which resulted in a ceasefire between the two rebel groups.

On 31 July 2017, 5 SRF groups in Daraa and Quneitra merged into the 1st Infantry Division and established a unified command structure for the SRF.

==== Southern groups ====
- Jaydour Horan Brigade
- 63rd Southern Division
  - Dawn of the Levant Union
  - Abu Dujana Brigades
  - Jafar al-Tayyar Brigade
  - Lions of Mercy Brigade
  - Free Yarmouk Brigade
  - Hazm Brigade
  - Mercy Brigade
  - Southern Martyrs Brigade
  - Martyr Abdul Rahim Samour Brigade
  - Special Tasks Brigade
- Coming Victory Brigade
- 7th Division
- Riyad al-Salehin Battalions of Damascus
- Special Assignments Regiment of Damascus
  - Armenian Battalion
- Helpers Brigades
- Southern Swords Division
- Martyr Captain Abu Hamza al-Naimi Union

===== Former =====
- Omari Brigades
- Omar Bin Al-Khattab Brigade
- All 5 groups left to form the 1st Imfantry Division
  - 1st Infantry Gathering
  - Gathering of Righteousness
  - Union of the Unity of the Nation
  - Saladin Brigades
  - Tank Brigade

== Israeli cooperation ==
A 2018 investigation by The Intercept, which gathered information from senior Southern Front commanders and Syrian activist sources, confirmed that Jaysh al-Ababil was among several factions receiving covert Israeli aid alongside others such as Saif al-Sham Brigade and Jaydour Horan Brigade. According to a 2018 investigation by Foreign Policy, Israel supported at least 12 rebel groups by providing them with humanitarian aid, medical treatments, logistical support and military transfers which included assault rifles, machine guns, mortar launchers and transport vehicles. Israel also transferred cash in the form of salaries of $75 per fighter, alongside additional funds for procuring weapons locally.

A 2018 investigation by The Intercept, which gathered information from senior Southern Front commanders and Syrian activist sources, confirmed that Jaydour Horan Brigade, which is part of the Syrian Revolutionaries Front was among several factions receiving covert Israeli aid alongside others such as Saif al-Sham Brigade and Jaysh al-Ababil. Reportedly, in late July 2017, a small group of Israeli military and intelligence personnel, traveling in ambulances, made a tour of the west Daraa countryside and met with commanders from Jaydour Horan Brigade and Jaysh al-Ababil. Another meeting then took place in September 2017 in the Quneitra border town of Rafid, where local council leaders, doctors, and militia commanders — including those from Jaydour Horan Brigade, Fursan al-Joulan, and the Syrian Revolutionaries Front — met with an Israeli representative to discuss further cooperation. According to a 2018 investigation by Foreign Policy, Israel supported at least 12 rebel groups by providing them with humanitarian aid, medical treatments, logistical support and military transfers which included assault rifles, machine guns, mortar launchers and transport vehicles. Israel also transferred cash in the form of salaries of $75 per fighter.

Throughout those meetings Israel tried to form the Southern Army in southern Syria, which included a group of opposition factions in the region. At that time, it was agreed that the army would include the Syrian Revolutionaries Front, Jabhat Ansar al-Islam, Fursan al-Joulan, and other factions operating in the area. However, in July 2018, as part of another attempt by Israel to establish the Southern Army, a military source in one of the factions that agreed to join the Southern Army told Al-Quds Al-Arabi that the Syrian Revolutionaries Front, Ahrar al-Sham and Al-Nusra Front rejected joining the Southern Army, while some members of the latter agreed to remain in the disengagement zone near the border with the Israeli-occupied Syrian Golan.

== See also ==
- South Lebanon Army
- Southern Syria clashes (July 2025–present)
- Other Israeli-supported Syrian rebel groups:
  - Southern Army (Syria)
  - Fursan al-Joulan
  - Firqat Ahrar Nawa
  - Saif al-Sham Brigade
  - Jaysh al-Ababil
  - Omar Bin Al-Khattab Brigade
  - Al-Ezz bin Abdul Salam
  - Al-Haramein Battalion
  - Jaydour Horan Brigade
  - Alwiya al-Furqan
  - Syrian Revolutionaries Front
  - Jabhat Ansar al-Islam
  - Ahrar Gathering
  - Abu Amara Brigades
  - Al-Nusra Front#Relations with Israel
- List of armed groups in the Syrian Civil War
