= Saif al-Sham Brigade =

Faction of the Free Syrian Army

Sword of the Levant Brigade
- لواء سيف الشام; Saif al-Sham Brigade
- Logo of
- Leaders: Abū Ṣalāḥ al‑Shāmī (political leader); Major Khalīl al‑Zawāra (military leader)
- Headquarters: Darayya
- Active regions: Rif Dimashq Governorate; Daraa Governorate; Quneitra Governorate
- Ideology: Revolution/Opposition
- Part of: (Syria) Free Syrian Army: (Syria) Southern Front
- Wars: the Syrian Civil War

Saif al-Sham Brigade (In Arabic: لواء سيف الشام, meaning "Sword of the Levant Brigade") is a Syrian rebel faction that operated primarily in southern Syria during the Syrian civil war. It was affiliated with the Southern Front of the Free Syrian Army (FSA) and was active mainly in the western parts of Daraa Governorate and Quneitra Governorate. The brigade was known for its relative discipline and avoidance of extremist ideology. This group was known to receive Israeli support alongside several other Syrian opposition factions such as Fursan al-Joulan, Firqat Ahrar Nawa, Jaysh al-Ababil, Jaydour Horan Brigade, Al-Ezz bin Abdul Salam Brigade, Omar Bin Al-Khattab Brigade, Al-Haramein Battalion, Alwiya al-Furqan, Syrian Revolutionaries Front, Jabhat Ansar al-Islam, Ahrar Gathering and others.

== History ==
The Saif al-Sham Brigade emerged around 2013 and drew its members largely from local communities in southern Syria, including defectors from the Syrian Arab Army. It became part of the moderate opposition movement under the umbrella of the Southern Front, and participated in coordinated military campaigns against government forces in southwestern Syria.

== Israeli cooperation ==
A 2018 investigation by The Intercept, which gathered information from senior Southern Front commanders and Syrian activist sources, confirmed that Saif al-Sham Brigade was among several factions receiving covert Israeli aid alongside others such as Jaydour Horan Brigade and Jaysh al-Ababil. According to a 2018 investigation by Foreign Policy, Israel supported at least 12 rebel groups by providing them with humanitarian aid, medical treatments, logistical support and military transfers which included assault rifles, machine guns, mortar launchers and transport vehicles. Israel also transferred cash in the form of salaries of $75 per fighter, alongside additional funds for procuring weapons locally.

On 21 July 2018, Al-Quds Al-Arabi reported that Israel was seeking to establish the Southern Army paramilitary force in southern Syria, and quoted a military source who claimed that Saif al-Sham Brigade, alongside Fursan al-Joulan, Al-Izz bin Abd al-Salam, will be the nucleus of the Southern Army.

On 22 Jul 2018, the commander of Saif al-Sham Brigade, Ahmad al-Nahs, along 3 other opposition commanders, have fled from Syrian territories with their families and were secured by Israeli military once they reached to the border line and settled in Israel.

== See also ==
- South Lebanon Army
- Southern Syria clashes (July 2025–present)
- Other Israeli-supported Syrian rebel groups:
  - Southern Army (Syria)
  - Fursan al-Joulan
  - Firqat Ahrar Nawa
  - Saif al-Sham Brigade
  - Jaysh al-Ababil
  - Omar Bin Al-Khattab Brigade
  - Al-Ezz bin Abdul Salam
  - Al-Haramein Battalion
  - Jaydour Horan Brigade
  - Alwiya al-Furqan
  - Syrian Revolutionaries Front
  - Jabhat Ansar al-Islam
  - Ahrar Gathering
  - Abu Amara Brigades
  - Al-Nusra Front#Relations with Israel
