= Southern Army (Syria) =

The Southern Army (Arabic: "جيش الجنوب") was an Israeli-proposed paramilitary force in southern Syria, aimed at establishing an Israeli friendly force at a buffer zone along the Israeli-occupied Golan Heights and to deter Iranian and Hezbollah influence in the region.

== Background ==
From 2013 to 2018, Israel supported at least 12 rebel groups by providing them with humanitarian aid, medical treatments, logistical support and military transfers which included assault rifles, machine guns, mortar launchers and transport vehicles. Israel also transferred cash in the form of salaries of $75 per fighter, alongside additional funds for procuring weapons locally.

Among of the Israeli-linked Syrian opposition groups included Fursan al-Joulan, Firqat Ahrar Nawa, Saif al-Sham Brigade, Jaysh al-Ababil , Al-Ezz bin Abdul Salam Brigade, Omar Bin Al-Khattab Brigade, Jaydour Horan Brigade, Al-Haramein Battalion, Alwiya al-Furqan, Syrian Revolutionaries Front, Jabhat Ansar al-Islam, Ahrar Gathering and others. The Israeli support to those groups was part of a broader Israeli effort to establish a buffer zone along the Israeli-occupied Golan Heights and to deter Iranian and Hezbollah influence in the region.

== Initial efforts ==
Reportedly, in late July 2017, a small group of Israeli military and intelligence personnel, allegedly traveling in ambulances, made a tour of the west Daraa countryside and met with commanders from Jaydour Horan Brigade and Jaysh al-Ababil. Another meeting then took place in September 2017 in the Quneitra border town of Rafid, where local council leaders, doctors, and militia commanders — including those from Jaydour Horan Brigade, Fursan al-Joulan, and the Syrian Revolutionaries Front — met with an Israeli representative to discuss further cooperation.

Throughout those meetings Israel tried to form a loyal army in southern Syria, which included a group of opposition factions in the region. At that time, it was agreed that the army would include the Syrian Revolutionaries Front, Jabhat Ansar al-Islam, Fursan al-Joulan, and other factions operating in the area. This army was deployed in the entire area of Al-Jidour in the northwestern countryside of Daraa, in addition to Nawa, and all the liberated areas in the countryside of Quneitra. Israel held more than one meeting with the leaders of Fursan al-Joulan and Jaysh al-Ababil, during which they agreed on armaments, funding, the number and deployment of the army, and the purpose of its formation. Israel provided the faction leaders with weapons, including anti-armor weapons, and financed them to buy weapons and ammunition from the liberated areas in the south, including heavy artillery ammunition and Russian T55 and T62 tanks that the IDF does not have. The Israeli goal in forming this army was to remove the Iranian threat from the border area with the occupied Golan, and to ensure that fighters from the area would not be displaced, guarantees that Russia later provided to Israel and Jordan in exchange for allowing the regime to launch a military operation in the south to force the opposition to a "settlement."

== The proposal ==
The Southern Army's goal was to enforce the demilitarized zone as it was defined and determined by the 1974 agreement. The number of fighters in the said army was said to be about 2,000, initially, with the possibility of increasing it later. The opposition factions had to hand over all their heavy weapons to Russia and keep only the light and medium weapons. The possibility of handing out all of their weapons and replace them with American weapons supplied by Israel was raised. The plan was to keep the demilitarized zone as a safe haven for military personnel, their families, and other civilians who have refused to return to regime areas.

Israel will directly oversee the Southern Army and identify its common positions in areas controlled by the Syrian regime. A hospital will be established to accommodate the sick or wounded in the area in order to meet the need, and admission to military hospitals in the Golan will be limited to critical cases that require high-level surgical intervention. The hospital is set to run by Syrian doctors and funded by a Syrian medical organization.

A military source in one of the factions that agreed to join the formation that Israel was seeking to establish, was quoted by Al-Quds Al-Arabi, claiming that the "Southern Army" was welcomed by some factions in Quneitra, and said that Fursan al-Joulan, Al-Izz bin Abd al-Salam and Saif al-Sham Brigade will be the nucleus of the Southern Army. The source added that the Syrian Revolutionaries Front, Ahrar al-Sham and Al-Nusra Front rejected joining the Southern Army, while some members of the latter agreed to remain in the disengagement zone near the border with the Israeli-occupied Syrian Golan.

The Israeli proposal was rejected by Russia, and the situation between the two sides became tense when Fursan al-Joulan prevented one of the engineering vehicles of the regime forces from opening the road for buses that were expected to enter and transport fighters rejecting the reconciliation agreement in Quneitra to Idlib province, northern Syria. Subsequently, a Russian military delegation entered Israel via Quneitra to meet with IDF military officials in order to resolve the tension between the regime forces and Fursan al-Joulan, which are supported by them. According to Al-Modon, the communication of some of the opposition leaders in the region with the regime and the Russians prevented the formation of Southern Army.

== Aftermath ==
Ayad Kamal, nicknamed "Moro", leader of Omar Bin Al-Khattab Brigade reached a reconciled agreement with the Syrian regime to have his group remain in its stronghold in Beit Jann as a regime-approved militia after an Israeli insistence on his survival as a local force that ensures the protection of the borders

On 22 July 2018, commanders of Israeli-supported Syrian factions such as Moaz Nassar and Abu Rateb of Fursan al-Joulan, Ahmad al-Nahs of Saif al-Sham Brigade, and Alaa al-Halaki of Jaysh al-Ababil have fled from Syrian territories with their families and were secured by Israeli military once they get to the border line.

In September 2019, rumours regarding the formation of the Southern Army resurfaced after local and Arab media circulated news about the formation of it with the support and funding of regional countries in an effort to curb Iranian influence in the region. However, those reports were dismissed, and it was speculated that their aim was to perpetuate the chaos and deflect the accusation from the regime forces of being behind the organized assassinations in Daraa and Quneitra.

Following the fall of Assad regime and the subsequent Israeli invasion of Syria, Israel tried to contact the remnants of Fursan al-Joulan in an attempt to reconstitute it under the name of the "Popular Protection Committees", whose mission will be to oppose any presence of the new Syrian government forces in the vicinity of the town, in preparation for redrawing contact lines on the ground. Remnants of Omar Bin Al-Khattab Brigade played a role in "facilitating the passage of Israeli patrols towards the heights of Mount Hermon, in addition to passing logistical support trucks and aid to Druze and Christian villages," according to sources, who indicated that "the faction objected to these operations only once, when it demanded a share of aid to be sent to Beit Jinn".

== See also ==
- South Lebanon Army
- Israeli-supported Syrian rebel groups:
  - Fursan al-Joulan
  - Firqat Ahrar Nawa
  - Saif al-Sham Brigade
  - Jaysh al-Ababil
  - Omar Bin Al-Khattab Brigade
  - Al-Ezz bin Abdul Salam
  - Al-Haramein Battalion
  - Jaydour Horan Brigade
  - Alwiya al-Furqan
  - Syrian Revolutionaries Front
  - Jabhat Ansar al-Islam
  - Ahrar Gathering
  - Abu Amara Brigades
  - Al-Nusra Front#Relations with Israel
