= Jabhat Ansar al-Islam =

Syrian rebel group

Jabhat Ansar al-Islam; Supporters of Islam Front
- جبهة أنصار الإسلام
- Logo of Jabhat Ansar al-Islam
- Leaders: Abu Muhammad al-Jolani; Abu al-Majd al-Jolani (POW); Bashar Abu Shihab (POW); Abu Mu'adh al-Agha (spokesman of Tajamu Ansar al-Islam, 2012–13)
- Dates active: 8 August 2012 – late 2013 (Tajamu Ansar al-Islam); 31 March 2014 – late 2018 (Jabhat Ansar al-Islam)
- Groups: Jabhat Ansar al-Islam: Usama ibn Zayd Brigade; Izz ibn 'Abd al-Salam Brigade; Battalion of the Chargers; Former, Tajamu Ansar al-Islam: Jaysh al-Islam; Alwiya al-Furqan; Ahfad al-Rasul Brigades; Katibat Hamza bin Abdelmuttalib; Al-Sahaba Brigades; Habib al-Mustafa Brigades; Shield of al-Sham Brigades
- Active regions: Quneitra Governorate; Daraa Governorate; Rif Dimashq Governorate (until 2017); Idlib Governorate (2015)
- Ideology: Sunni Islamism; Jihadism
- Part of: (Syrian opposition) Free Syrian Army (2012–2013, since 2016); (Syrian opposition) Southern Front (April-July 2017); (Syrian opposition) National Front for the Liberation of Syria (since July); Syrian Revolutionary Command Council (2014–2015)
- Wars: Syrian Civil War

Jabhat Ansar al-Islam (Arabic: جبهة أنصار الإسلام; Supporters of Islam Front), originally formed as Tajamu' Ansar al-Islam (Arabic: تجمع أنصار الإسلام; Assembly of the Supporters of Islam) in August 2012, is an independent Sunni Islamist Syrian rebel group active in the Quneitra and Daraa Governorates.

Jabhat Ansar al-Islam is among dozens of Syrian rebel groups that have in the past been supplied with US-made BGM-71 TOW anti-tank missiles and Soviet-made 9K32 Strela-2 MANPADS with US approval.

The group was also known to receive Israeli support alongside several other Syrian opposition factions such as Fursan al-Joulan, Firqat Ahrar Nawa, Saif al-Sham Brigade, Jaydour Horan Brigade, Al-Ezz bin Abdul Salam Brigade, Omar Bin Al-Khattab Brigade, Al-Haramein Battalion, Alwiya al-Furqan, Syrian Revolutionaries Front, Jaysh al-Ababil, Ahrar Gathering and others.

== Ideology ==
Abu al-Majd al-Jolani, commander of Jabhat Ansar al-Islam, stated during an interview on 14 July 2014 that he wanted to establish an Islamic state based on Sharia, and opposed both democracy and a caliphate similar to one proclaimed by the Islamic State of Iraq and the Levant.

== History ==
The group was originally formed as Tajamu Ansar al-Islam, or the Gathering of Supporters of Islam, a coalition of several Sunni Islamist groups in Damascus and the Rif Dimashq Governorate, announced on 8 August 2012. The coalition initially consisted of the Habib al-Mustafa Brigade, the Companions Battalions, Jaysh al-Islam, Alwiya al-Furqan, and the Shield of al-Sham Battalions. The group took part in the rebel capture of the Marj al-Sultan heliport on 25 November 2012 and the Battle of Daraya, part of the Rif Dimashq offensive (November 2012–February 2013).

In late 2013, Tajamu Ansar al-Islam fell apart due to differences and disputes between its component groups.

On 31 March 2014, Jabhat Ansar al-Islam was formed in the Damascus and Quneitra countryside by the Usama ibn Zayd Brigade, Izz ibn 'Abd al-Salam Brigade, and the Battalion of the Chargers. Some time after its formation, the group established a branch in southern Damascus.

On 21 February 2015, the group announced the creation of a branch in the Idlib Governorate in northwestern Syria.

On 6 April 2017, clashes erupted between Jabhat Ansar al-Islam and the Syrian Revolutionaries Front in the northern Quneitra countryside, which resulted in 7 rebels being killed. Government forces shelled the area on the same day, which resulted in a ceasefire between the two rebel groups.

On 30 May 2018, two commanders of Jabhat Ansar al-Islam, Abu al-Majd al-Jolani and Bashar Abu Shihab, were captured by groups affiliated with the Free Syrian Army in the Quneitra countryside while attempting to surrender to the Syrian Army carrying around $300,000.

== Israeli cooperation ==
During meetings which were held in late 2017 and mid-2018, Israel tried to form the paramilitary Southern Army in southern Syria, which includes a group of opposition factions in the region. At that time, it was agreed that the army would include Jabhat Ansar al-Islam, alongside the Syrian Revolutionaries Front, Fursan al-Joulan and other factions operating in the area. The army was set to be deployed in the entire area of Al-Jidour in the northwestern countryside of Daraa, in addition to Nawa, and all the liberated areas in the countryside of Quneitra. A military source in one of the factions that agreed to join the formation that Israel was seeking to establish, was quoted by Al-Quds Al-Arabi, claiming that the "Southern Army" was welcomed by some factions in Quneitra, and said that Al-Izz bin Abd al-Salam, which is part of Jabhat Ansar al-Islam, alongside Fursan al-Joulan and Saif al-Sham Brigade will from the nucleus of the Southern Army.

According to a 2018 investigation by Foreign Policy, Israel supported at least 12 rebel groups by providing them with humanitarian aid, medical treatments, logistical support and military transfers which included assault rifles, machine guns, mortar launchers and transport vehicles. Israel also transferred cash in the form of salaries of $75 per fighter, alongside additional funds for procuring weapons locally.

== See also ==
- South Lebanon Army
- Southern Syria clashes (July 2025–present)
- Other Israeli-supported Syrian rebel groups:
  - Southern Army (Syria)
  - Fursan al-Joulan
  - Firqat Ahrar Nawa
  - Saif al-Sham Brigade
  - Jaysh al-Ababil
  - Omar Bin Al-Khattab Brigade
  - Al-Ezz bin Abdul Salam
  - Al-Haramein Battalion
  - Jaydour Horan Brigade
  - Alwiya al-Furqan
  - Syrian Revolutionaries Front
  - Jabhat Ansar al-Islam
  - Al-Ahrar Gathering
  - Abu Amara Brigades
  - Al-Nusra Front#Relations with Israel
- List of armed groups in the Syrian Civil War
