= Jaydour Horan Brigade =

Faction of the Free Syrian Army

- لواء جيدور حوران; Liwa Jaydour
- Logo of Jaydour Horan Brigade
- Leaders: Col. Yassin Ali al-Alloush; Abdul Hamid Qana
- Headquarters: Al-Jidur
- Active regions: Daraa Governorate
- Ideology: Revolution / Opposition
- Part of: (Syria) Free Syrian Army; (Syria) Southern Front; (Syria) Syrian Revolutionaries Front; (Syria) Daraa Military Council (until 2015)
- Wars: Syrian Civil War
- Website: Official X account Official YouTube account

Jaydour Horan Brigade (Arabic: لواء جيدور حوران; Liwa Jaydour) is a Syrian rebel group that operated in the village of Al-Jidur and its surroundings in the Daraa Governorate during the Syrian Civil War. This group was known to receive Israeli support alongside several other Syrian opposition factions such as Fursan al-Joulan, Firqat Ahrar Nawa, Saif al-Sham Brigade, Jaysh al-Ababil , Al-Ezz bin Abdul Salam Brigade, Omar Bin Al-Khattab Brigade, Al-Haramein Battalion, Alwiya al-Furqan, Syrian Revolutionaries Front, Jabhat Ansar al-Islam, Ahrar Gathering and others.

== History ==
The group was formed on August 26, 2012, in the al-Jidur area of Daraa province, while the brigade published its official founding statement on October 29, 2012, and was led by Col. Yassin Ali al-Alloush, and known as Toami al-Halqi and Abdul Hamid Qana. The brigade was active in the cities and towns of Izraa, Al-Sanamayn, Jassem, Tal Al-Hara, Al-Jidour, Nawa, and Khan Arnaba in the governorates of Daraa and Quneitra, and participated in several military battles, most notably: "Battle of Storm Hauran", "Battle of Jaljalat", "The Great Battle of Imam Al-Nawawi", "Battle of Dawn and Ten Nights", "Battle of Retribution for Martyrs", and "Battle of the Storm of the South".

The group was formed on August 26, 2012, in the al-Jidur area of Daraa province, as the group published its official founding statement on October 29, 2012, and was led by Col. Yassin Ali al-Alloush, and known as Toami al-Halqi and Abdul Hamid Qana. According to the official statement, the brigade was formed by the merging of the "Al-Muhajireen and Al-Ansar Battalion", "Ghabagheb Martyrs Battalion", "Musab Bin Omair Battalion", "Talha and Zubair Battalion", "Inkhil Martyrs Battalion", "Al-Jaydour Martyrs Battalion", "Abu Al-Hassan Martyr Battalion", and the "Islam Falcons Battalion", "Horan Falcons Battalion", "Kafr Shams Fedayeen Battalion", "Abu Bakr Al-Siddiq Battalion", "Al-Sanamayn Martyrs Battalion", "Hauran Mujahideen Battalion".

Later, the group joined the Daraa Province's Revolutionary Military Council on October 29, 2012, the Syrian Revolutionaries Front – Southern Syria Sector on January 1, 2014, the South Syria Revolutionary Front on May 1, 2014, and the group and the Qasioun Brigades merged into the Southern Front on April 13, 2015. The brigade also co-founded the Fateheen Operations Room on March 6, 2014, the Nasrat Mahjah Western Region Operations Room on December 27, 2016, the Nawa Operations Room on February 28, 2017, and the Sit-in Operations Room on June 21, 2018.

== Israeli cooperation ==
A 2018 investigation by The Intercept, which gathered information from senior Southern Front commanders and Syrian activist sources, confirmed that Jaydour Horan Brigade was among several factions receiving covert Israeli aid alongside others such as Saif al-Sham Brigade and Jaysh al-Ababil. Reportedly, in late July 2017, a small group of Israeli military and intelligence personnel, traveling in ambulances, made a tour of the west Daraa countryside and met with commanders from Jaydour Horan Brigade and Jaysh al-Ababil. Another meeting then took place in September 2017 in the Quneitra border town of Rafid, where local council leaders, doctors, and militia commanders — including those from Jaydour Horan Brigade, Fursan al-Joulan, and the Syrian Revolutionaries Front — met with an Israeli representative to discuss further cooperation. According to a 2018 investigation by Foreign Policy, Israel supported at least 12 rebel groups by providing them with humanitarian aid, medical treatments, logistical support and military transfers which included assault rifles, machine guns, mortar launchers and transport vehicles. Israel also transferred cash in the form of salaries of $75 per fighter, alongside additional funds for procuring weapons locally.

== See also ==
- South Lebanon Army
- Southern Syria clashes (July 2025–present)
- Other Israeli-supported Syrian rebel groups:
  - Southern Army (Syria)
  - Fursan al-Joulan
  - Firqat Ahrar Nawa
  - Saif al-Sham Brigade
  - Jaysh al-Ababil
  - Omar Bin Al-Khattab Brigade
  - Al-Ezz bin Abdul Salam
  - Al-Haramein Battalion
  - Alwiya al-Furqan
  - Syrian Revolutionaries Front
  - Jabhat Ansar al-Islam
  - Ahrar Gathering
  - Abu Amara Brigades
  - Al-Nusra Front#Relations with Israel
