= Omar Bin Al-Khattab Brigade =

Faction of the Free Syrian Army

- لواء عمر بن الخطاب
- Leader: Iyad Kamal (nicknamed "Moro")
- Headquarters: Beit Jinn
- Active regions: Rif Dimashq Governorate; Quneitra Governorate; Daraa Governorate
- Ideology: Revolution / Opposition (until 2017)
- Size: 250-900
- Part of: (Syria) Free Syrian Army (until 2017); Syrian Revolutionaries Front (until 2017) (Syria) Hermon Regiment (since 2017)
- Wars: the Syrian Civil War

The Omar Bin Al-Khattab Brigade (Arabic: لواء عمر بن الخطاب, romanized: Liwa Omar ibn al-Khattab) is a Syrian rebel faction operating in the southern sector of the Quneitra Governorate within the broader Southern Front of the Free Syrian Army. Centered around the town of Beit Jinn, the group engaged in coordinated operations alongside other western Daraa‑Quneitra factions during the civil war. This group was known to receive Israeli support alongside several other Syrian opposition factions such as Fursan al-Joulan, Firqat Ahrar Nawa, Saif al-Sham Brigade, Jaydour Horan Brigade, Al-Ezz bin Abdul Salam Brigade, Jaysh al-Ababil, Al-Haramein Battalion, Alwiya al-Furqan, Syrian Revolutionaries Front, Jabhat Ansar al-Islam, Ahrar Gathering and others.

== History ==
The group was formed in Western Ghouta on June 21, 2013, under the banner of Liwa al-Haq, affiliated with the Prophet's Descendants Brigades and Brigades as the Omar Ibn al-Khattab Brigade, before identifying itself as a brigade shortly after.

The brigade later joined the Syrian Revolutionaries Front and fought several military operations and battles against regime forces and militias loyal to them, most notably the Battle of Bishr al-Sabireen.

The group drew primarily from local fighters based in the Beit Jinn enclave and adjacent Mount Hermon areas. It coordinated with other moderate opposition factions in the Southern Front and fought in various offensives against the Assad government and its allies.

On 13 January 2022, Aleppo Today's correspondent reported Iyad Kamal to an injury suffered following an assassination attempt carried out by members of the regime in the town of Beit Jinn in the Mount Hermon area.

Following Iyad Kamal's assassination, clashes took place in late February 2022 between the group and a member of the Othman family which is affiliated with the "Fourth Division" in the town of Mazraat Beit Jinn, during which six people were killed between the two parties, after the group accused Othman's family of killing their leader while he was touring the town. Renewed clashes between the two sides began in early June 2022, resulting in the injury of four children with stray bullets, who were transferred to Al-Mujtahid Hospital in the capital, Damascus.

== Reconciliation agreement ==
Following the military advances of the Assad's regime, the group was pressured to reach a reconciliation agreement. It became a battalion which is affiliated with the military intelligence’s and remained under the command and leadership of Moro. The former commander in the Jabal al-Sheikh brigades claimed that 900 people have joined the Hermon Regiment’s Beit Jann battalion. However, the former commander in the Muslim Brotherhood’s Beit Jann affiliate says that this number is an exaggeration, and that there are 250 members of the Beit Jann battalion. In late January 2018 Moro denied that he had anything to do with the reconciliation, clearly intending to counter reports at the time that he was involved in the matter. On 4 Jul 2020, Aymenn Jawad Al-Tamimi published an interview which was conducted with the former leader the Hermon Regiment, known by the nickname of 'Khattab', in which he claimed that Moro became a commander but only in a symbolic sense as arms did not remain with him, and that he was receiving salaries for his fighters.

== Connection to Israel ==
The leader of Omar Bin Al-Khattab Brigade's, Moro, held a very close relationship Israel according to senior Syrian opposition sources in the area who were close to him, such as the former commander in the Jabal al-Sheikh Brigades and the former commander in Beit Jann’s Muslim Brotherhood affiliate. It's claimed that Moro held periodic meetings with the Israelis in the Israeli-controlled Golan Heights, and among the aid that Israel provided to him and his group were “ammunition, weapons, food and medicines". It was noted that in addition to a Syrian phone number, Moro also had an Israeli phone number with the +972 dialing code for Israel.

Based on multiple accounts the group is one of several Syrian factions receiving covert support from Israel. Analyst Elizabeth Tsurkov and sources quoted in a 2018 Foreign Policy report:

Israel began arming rebel groups aligned with the Free Syrian Army in 2013, including factions in Quneitra, Daraa, and elsewhere. Two of the groups Israel supported have been publicly identified — Fursan al-Joulan (Knights of the Golan), a faction based in Jubata al‑Khashab in Quneitra Governorate, and Liwaa Omar bin al‑Khattab, based in Beit Jinn, a town bordering Mount Hermon.

Support reportedly included "light arms, ammunition, mortar launchers, and transport vehicles", delivered via routes crossing from Israeli-occupied Golan Heights. Rebels reportedly received "monthly stipends (~US $75)" alongside additional funds for procuring weapons locally.

A military source told Al Modon that "Moro" reached an agreement with the Russian side after an Israeli insistence on his survival as a local force that ensures the protection of the borders.

On 24 February 2017, Syrian activists confirmed the death of Iyad Kamal's brother, Imad Kamal, who was responsible for organization the contacts between the group and the Israeli authorities. The activists denied Iyad Kamal's death, after SANA reported that he was killed along with three other gunmen following artillery strikes by the Syrian army in the red hills, east of Hader in the northern countryside of Quneitra.

On 9 May 2025, Al-Akhbar reported that Israeli is trying to revive an group, in which sources from Beit Jinn quoted as saying that "this communication is being revived on the basis of the legacy left by the former faction leader, Muhammad Iyad Kamal, known as "Moro", before his assassination in January 2022," pointing out that "Kamal maintained until after the settlement agreement, his communication with the officers of the Israeli Golani Brigade, and he held periodic meetings with the occupation, which made him a target for assassination by the regime". Reportedly, following the fall of the Assad regime, members of the group played a role in "facilitating the passage of Israeli patrols towards the heights of Mount Hermon, in addition to passing logistical support trucks and aid to Druze and Christian villages," according to the sources, who indicated that "the faction objected to these operations only once, when it demanded a share of aid to be sent to Beit Jinn". In conjunction, Eram News reported that Israel began to establish a military separation wall in southern Syria through a new military unit known as the "Eastern Division", which includes factions and elements of collaborators in the southern Syria. Local source in Daraa confirmed to Eram News that that Israel has begun contacting some figures from Fursan al-Joulan, which was active in the town of Jubata al-Khashab, in addition to figures from Hermon Regiment (formerly Omar Bin Al-Khattab Brigade) which controls the Beit Jinn area - both factions of whom Israel previously cooperated with during the era of the Assad's regime, and of which now Israel is trying to annex them into the "Eastern Division".

On 28 November, Israel's 55th Reserve Paratroopers Brigade, belonging to the 210th Division, launched an incursion and strikes in Beit Jinn in an attempt to apprehend members of the al-Fajr Forces, the military wing of the Islamic Group (Jamaa Islamiya). During the operation, Hassan al-Saadi, a young man from the village ambushed and opened fire on the IDF forces, wounding six of them. In a photograph of Hassan which circulated online after his death, he is seen holding an M-16 rifle whose stock was manufactured by the Israeli company Emtan Karmiel, and whose Picatinny rail was manufactured by IMI Defense. According to Israeli researcher Elizabeth Tsurkov, Hassan did not steal the weapon, based on two of his acquaintances, it was given to him by Israel when he was a member of Omar Bin Al-Khattab Brigade during the Syrian Civil war, and prior to Assad's recapture of the village of Beit Jinn in 2017. Elizabeth Tsurkov highlighted how Israel's policy since the fall of Assad regime lacks a clear overarching goal, and how the presence of the IDF forces in Syria leads to friction with a civilian population that was once sympathetic to Israel, but after the Israeli invasion, this attitude changed, as evidenced by the attack on IDF soldiers by Hassan al-Saadi and residents of Beit Jinn. The IDF's conduct fueled local hostility: imposing curfews on villages, destroying orchards, and denying access to agricultural fields and grazing areas, which are the main sources of livelihood in these poor areas of Syria.

== See also ==
- South Lebanon Army
- Southern Syria clashes (July 2025–present)
- Other Israeli-supported Syrian rebel groups:
  - Southern Army (Syria)
  - Fursan al-Joulan
  - Firqat Ahrar Nawa
  - Saif al-Sham Brigade
  - Jaysh al-Ababil
  - Omar Bin Al-Khattab Brigade
  - Al-Ezz bin Abdul Salam
  - Al-Haramein Battalion
  - Jaydour Horan Brigade
  - Alwiya al-Furqan
  - Syrian Revolutionaries Front
  - Jabhat Ansar al-Islam
  - Ahrar Gathering
  - Abu Amara Brigades
  - Al-Nusra Front#Relations with Israel
- Armed factions in the Syrian civil war § Israel
