= Al-Ahrar Gathering =

Faction of the Free Syrian Army

- Leader: Nasser Mohammed Ruwais
- Active regions: Quneitra Governorate
- Part of: (Syria) Free Syrian Army
- Wars: the Syrian Civil War

Al-Ahrar Gathering was a Free Syrian Army faction based in Quneitra Governorate. This group was known to receive Israeli support alongside several other Syrian opposition factions such as Fursan al-Joulan, Firqat Ahrar Nawa, Saif al-Sham Brigade, Jaydour Horan Brigade, Al-Ezz bin Abdul Salam Brigade, Omar Bin Al-Khattab Brigade, Al-Haramein Battalion, Alwiya al-Furqan, Syrian Revolutionaries Front, Jabhat Ansar al-Islam, Jaysh al-Ababil and others.

== History ==
In January 2018, Enab Baladi's correspondent in Daraa reported at the time that the Islamic State's Khalid ibn al-Walid Army attacked the faction's positions in the villages of Jubailiya and Al-Bakkar, west of Daraa, and advanced in the village of Jubailiya. He said that the Free Syrian Army's factions sent a convoy of support from the city of Nawa, but after entering the town of Jubailiya, they were ambushed which led to the siege of a number of fighters. An Israeli drones thwarted an attack by the Khalid ibn al-Walid Army on the positions of the Al-Ahrar Gathering in the western countryside of Daraa. A military source confirmed to Enab Baladi at the time that an Israeli drone participated in repelling the attack, and that it targeted the positions of the Khalid ibn al-Walid Army with two missiles.

On 13 April 2018, a bomb exploded, killing the Al-Ahrar Gathering's leader, Nasser Mohammed Ruwais, nicknamed "Abu Yazan al-Jubailiya", as well as seriously injuring Al-Amreen Brigade's leader, Abu Jawad al-Jubailiya in an area near the town of Ghadir al-Bustan in the countryside of Quneitra. Following the event, which was described as an "assassination", the town of Ghadir al-Bustan witnessed raids and shooting by some factions of the Free Syrian Army under the pretext of searching for the Islamic State's Khalid ibn al-Walid Army cells in the area. According to a military source quoted by Enab Baladi, "Abu Yazan" was known for his relations with the Israeli army.

On 12 June 2022, unknown persons attacked the headquarters of the former leader of the opposition factions and one of the current leaders of the reconciliations, known as "Abu Hazza", in the village of Mamtna in the northern countryside of Quneitra. STEP news agency's correspondent in southern Syria, Raji al-Qassim, said that the attack led to the death of Ibrahim Hazza, "Abu Hazza's brother", and the wounding of Abu Hazza, after which he was transferred to a hospital in the capital Damascus. The correspondent added that Abu Hazza became affiliated with the Military Security Branch after the regime forces took control of southern Syria in late July 2018. The correspondent pointed out that Abu Hazza worked within the ranks of the Syrian Revolutionaries Front, then Al-Ezz bin Abdul Salam and finally to Al-Ahrar Gathering after which he tried to coordinate with the Israeli side, which prompted the leader of the Al-Ahrar Gathering, Abu Yazan Jubailiya, to dismiss him from the group. In late 2017, Abu Hazza officially worked with Israel in several areas, including bringing food into the area and coordinating with the medical post on the Israeli border.

== See also ==
- South Lebanon Army
- Southern Syria clashes (July 2025–present)
- Other Israeli-supported Syrian rebel groups:
  - Southern Army (Syria)
  - Fursan al-Joulan
  - Firqat Ahrar Nawa
  - Saif al-Sham Brigade
  - Jaysh al-Ababil
  - Omar Bin Al-Khattab Brigade
  - Al-Ezz bin Abdul Salam
  - Al-Haramein Battalion
  - Jaydour Horan Brigade
  - Alwiya al-Furqan
  - Syrian Revolutionaries Front
  - Jabhat Ansar al-Islam
  - Al-Ahrar Gathering
  - Abu Amara Brigades
  - Al-Nusra Front#Relations with Israel
