= Firqat Ahrar Nawa =

Faction of the Free Syrian Army

Free Men of Nawa Brigade
- فرقة أحرار نوى; Firqat Ahrar Nawa
- Logo of Firqat Ahrar Nawa
- Leaders: Abdullah al‑Qura‘aẓa; Major Khaled Hussein Taha; Mazen "Abu Walid" Jawad
- Headquarters: Nawa
- Active regions: Daraa Governorate
- Ideology: Opposition / Revolution
- Part of: (Syria) Free Syrian Army; (Syria) Southern Front; (Syria) Army of the Revolution
- Wars: the Syrian Civil War

Firqat Ahrar Nawa (فرقة أحرار نوى, meaning "Free Men of Nawa Brigade") is a Syrian rebel group that operated in the city of Nawa and its surroundings in the Daraa Governorate during the Syrian Civil War. It was affiliated with the Free Syrian Army, and has been publicly identified as one of several local factions to receive covert support from Israel, alongside Fursan al-Joulan, Jaysh al-Ababil, Saif al-Sham Brigade, Jaydour Horan Brigade, Al-Ezz bin Abdul Salam Brigade, Omar Bin Al-Khattab Brigade, Al-Haramein Battalion, Alwiya al-Furqan, Syrian Revolutionaries Front, Jabhat Ansar al-Islam, Ahrar Gathering and others.

The group was formed on 12 September 2012 in the town of Nawa in Daraa province, and was led by Brigadier General Abdullah al-Qaraza, then Major Khaled Hussein Taha, and then Brigadier General Abdullah al-Qaraazah was reinstated after the problem of the dismissal of Major Taha by some formations of the division on 7 October 2017, and its leaders were known as Mazen Jawad, Yahya al-Saqer, and Muhammad Khaled Ahmed Taha.

The group joined the Salvation Army on 26 May 2018, and participated in several alliances and military operations rooms, most notably: the Supreme Military Council in Nawa, the Southern Forces Alliance, the Nawa Operations Room, the Operations Room and Sit-in, and the Southern Storm Operations Room.

== Areas of operation ==
The group was based primarily in the town of Nawa, located in the Daraa Governorate in southern Syria.

The group was active in the cities and towns of Nawa, Muzayrib, Izraa, Tzil, Al-Shajara, Al-Sanamayn, and Sheikh Miskin. It also participated in several military battles, most notably: "The Battle of Death and Not Humiliation", "The Battle of the Conquerors", "The Battle for Control of the Village of Jadia", "The Battle of Removing Daggers", and "The Battle of the Southern Storm".

== Support and cooperation with Israel ==
According to a 2018 investigation by Foreign Policy, Israel supported at least 12 rebel groups by providing them with humanitarian aid, medical treatments, logistical support and military transfers which included assault rifles, machine guns, mortar launchers and transport vehicles. Israel also transferred cash in the form of salaries of $75 per fighter, alongside additional funds for procuring weapons locally.

Multiple media reports have indicated that Firqat Ahrar Nawa was one of at many Syrian rebel groups to receive support from Israel during the war. On 19 September 2017, Firqat Ahrar Nawa posted a video to YouTube showing rebels unloading a truck full of crates with Hebrew writing before deploying a multiple rocket launcher against an unidentified target.

== See also ==
- South Lebanon Army
- Southern Syria clashes (July 2025–present)
- Other Israeli-supported Syrian rebel groups:
  - Southern Army (Syria)
  - Fursan al-Joulan
  - Firqat Ahrar Nawa
  - Saif al-Sham Brigade
  - Jaysh al-Ababil
  - Omar Bin Al-Khattab Brigade
  - Al-Ezz bin Abdul Salam
  - Al-Haramein Battalion
  - Jaydour Horan Brigade
  - Alwiya al-Furqan
  - Syrian Revolutionaries Front
  - Jabhat Ansar al-Islam
  - Ahrar Gathering
  - Abu Amara Brigades
  - Al-Nusra Front#Relations with Israel
