= Abu Amara Brigades =

Faction of the Free Syrian Army

- لواء عمر بن الخطاب
- Leaders: Abu Jaafar; Muhanna Jaffala (Abu Bakr)
- Headquarters: Aleppo
- Active regions: Aleppo Governorate
- Ideology: Revolution / Opposition
- Size: ~1000
- Part of: Levant Front (February 2015 - October 2015); Ahrar al-Sham (October 2015); Hay'at Tahrir al-Sham (May 2017)
- Wars: the Syrian Civil War

Abu Amara Brigades (Arabic: لواء عمر بن الخطاب, romanized: Kata’ib Abu Amara) was an Aleppo-based Syrian faction which was structured as an umbrella of neighborhood militias, with under 1,000 fighters. Within that faction was a specialized clandestine branch called Suriyat Abu Amara li-Mahaam al-Khasa, which translates to Abu Amara for Special Tasks. This branch was dedicated to targeted assassinations—key regime and IRGC-linked officers. The faction was led by Muhanna Jaffala (also known as Abu Bakri).

== History ==
After the factions left Aleppo, the faction's members and leaders moved to Idlib, and the Abu Amara Brigades announced to join Hay'at Tahrir al-Sham on May 20, 2017, but the Abu Amara Special Missions taska, led by Muhanna Jaffala, announced that it would continue to operate independently.

== Israeli connections ==
=== Aziz Azbar's assassination ===
On 4 August 2018, Aziz Azbar, a Syrian scientist who was in charge of improving the range and accuracy of the Assad regime’s Scud missiles, was assassinated by explosives planted inside his car. Pro-government Syrian newspaper, Al-Watan, accused Israel of being behind the assassination. Subsequently, Abu Amara Special Tasks claimed responsibility for the operation. A senior figure from intelligence agency quoted by The New York Times confirmed that the Mossad was behind the assassination. Al-Watan reported that Syrian authorities had twice detained cells of local suspects allegedly recruited by Mossad who were engaged in monitoring Asbar’s movements and claimed that Abu Amara, who took responsibility for the attack, was working on behalf of Israel. A field source quoted by Mashregh News claimed that the Israel used the pro-opposition Abu Amara Brigades militant group to carry out this assassination, adding that in similar fashion Israel carried out the assassination of several Syrian army commanders and Palestinian Qods Brigade commanders in the provinces of Aleppo and Hama.

=== Explosions of ammunition depots ===
Several detonated ammunition depots of which the group took responsibility of planting explosive inside of them, were also attributed to Israel.

== See also ==
- South Lebanon Army
- Southern Syria clashes (July 2025–present)
- Other Israeli-supported Syrian rebel groups:
  - Fursan al-Joulan
  - Southern Army (Syria)
  - Firqat Ahrar Nawa
  - Saif al-Sham Brigade
  - Jaysh al-Ababil
  - Omar Bin Al-Khattab Brigade
  - Al-Ezz bin Abdul Salam
  - Al-Haramein Battalion
  - Jaydour Horan Brigade
  - Alwiya al-Furqan
  - Syrian Revolutionaries Front
  - Jabhat Ansar al-Islam
  - Ahrar Gathering
  - Abu Amara Brigades
  - Al-Nusra Front#Relations with Israel
