= Al-Haramein Battalion =

Faction of the Free Syrian Army

The Battalion of the Two Holy Mosques
- كتيبة الحرمين; Al-Haramein Battalion
- Leader: Sharif as-Safouri
- Headquarters: Hit
- Active regions: Daraa Governorate
- Ideology: Revolution / Opposition
- Part of: (Syria) Free Syrian Army
- Wars: the Syrian Civil War

Al-Haramein Battalion (Arabic: كتيبة الحرمين; meaning The Battalion of the Two Holy Mosques) is a Free Syrian Army's rebel group which operated in Hit and its surrounding areas in Daraa Governorate, specifically near the Israeli-occupied Golan Heights in southern Syria, during the Syrian Civil War. The group was led by Sharif as-Safouri. This group was known to receive Israeli support alongside several other Syrian opposition factions such as Fursan al-Joulan, Firqat Ahrar Nawa, Saif al-Sham Brigade, Jaydour Horan Brigade, Al-Ezz bin Abdul Salam Brigade, Omar Bin Al-Khattab Brigade, Jaysh al-Ababil, Alwiya al-Furqan, Syrian Revolutionaries Front, Jabhat Ansar al-Islam, Ahrar Gathering and others.

On 22 July 2014, the group's commander, Sharif as-Safouri, was abducted by al-Qaeda-affiliated Al-Nusra Front over allegations of cooperation with Israel. In a video uploaded to YouTube by the Executive Sharia Council in the eastern Daraa Region, an Islamic court established by Al-Nusra in southern Syria, Sharif As-Safouri, admitted to collaboration with Israel. In the edited confession video, he said that he at first met with an Israeli officer named Ashraf at the border and was given an Israeli cellular phone. He later met with another officer named Younis and with the two men’s commander, Abu Daoud. In total, Safouri said he entered Israel five times for meetings that took place in Tiberias. Following the meetings, Israel began providing Safouri and his men with “basic medical support and clothes” as well as weapons, which included 30 Russian [rifles], 10 RPG launchers with 47 rockets, and 48,000 5.56 millimeter bullets. According to a 2018 investigation by Foreign Policy, Israel supported at least 12 rebel groups by providing them with humanitarian aid, medical treatments, logistical support and military transfers which included assault rifles, machine guns, mortar launchers and transport vehicles. Israel also transferred cash in the form of salaries of $75 per fighter, alongside additional funds for procuring weapons locally.

On 1 August 2014, dozens of demonstrators took to the streets of the village of Hayt, Safouri’s hometown near Syria’s borders with Jordan and Israel, to protest his abduction, condemning Al-Nusra Front for the act.

In December 2014, a video obtained and translated by MEMRI offered an insight into the tensions which simmered between Free Syrian Army's battalion (including Al-Haramein Battalion) and Al-Nusra Front, prior to Al-Nusra's arrest of Sharif as-Safouri in July 2014. The video showed an angry group of fighters from several allied battalions belonging to the Free Syrian Army (FSA) clashing with members of Al Qaeda's Nusra Front. The FSA fighters were led by Sharif Al-Safouri, commander of Al-Haramein Battalion, who claimed that Nusra fighters had stolen war booty taken from Assad regime troops. At one point other commanders direct the camera to the Nusra commander, calling for him to be punished.

On 8 October 2015, Al-Haramein Battalion's commander, Mohammed al-Safouri (nicknamed Arour), was assassinated in the town of Hayt. Activists reported that the assassination was carried out by planting a sticky device in the car of Mohammed al-Safouri which led to the death of him and his companions, who were with him in the car (his brother Ghassan al-Safouri and Hussein al-Tamari). It was reported that Al-Haramein Battalion's former commander, Sharif al-Safouri, was still under the arrest of Al-Nusra Front at that time.

== See also ==
- South Lebanon Army
- Southern Syria clashes (July 2025–present)
- Other Israeli-supported Syrian rebel groups:
  - Southern Army (Syria)
  - Fursan al-Joulan
  - Firqat Ahrar Nawa
  - Saif al-Sham Brigade
  - Jaysh al-Ababil
  - Omar Bin Al-Khattab Brigade
  - Al-Ezz bin Abdul Salam
  - Al-Haramein Battalion
  - Jaydour Horan Brigade
  - Alwiya al-Furqan
  - Syrian Revolutionaries Front
  - Jabhat Ansar al-Islam
  - Ahrar Gathering
  - Abu Amara Brigades
  - Al-Nusra Front#Relations with Israel
