= Jaysh al-Ababil =

- ألوية ابابيل حوران
- Leader: Abu Tawfiq al-Shami
- Dates active: 2014–2018
- Active regions: Damascus Governorate; Homs Governorate; Daraa Governorate
- Ideology: Revolution
- Part of: (Syria) Free Syrian Army: (Syria) Southern Front
- Wars: the Syrian Civil War
- Website: Official X account

The Jaysh al-Ababil (Arabic: جيش الأبابيل) was a rebel group active during the Syrian Civil War. It joined the Southern Front on 14 February 2014. The group was active in the Damascus Governorate. This group was known to receive Israeli support alongside several other Syrian opposition factions such as Fursan al-Joulan, Firqat Ahrar Nawa, Saif al-Sham Brigade, Jaydour Horan Brigade, Al-Ezz bin Abdul Salam Brigade, Omar Bin Al-Khattab Brigade, Al-Haramein Battalion, Alwiya al-Furqan, Syrian Revolutionaries Front, Jabhat Ansar al-Islam, Ahrar Gathering and others.

== Israeli cooperation ==
A 2018 investigation by The Intercept, which gathered information from senior Southern Front commanders and Syrian activist sources, confirmed that Jaysh al-Ababil was among several factions receiving covert Israeli aid alongside others such as Saif al-Sham Brigade and Jaydour Horan Brigade. According to a 2018 investigation by Foreign Policy, Israel supported at least 12 rebel groups by providing them with humanitarian aid, medical treatments, logistical support and military transfers which included assault rifles, machine guns, mortar launchers and transport vehicles. Israel also transferred cash in the form of salaries of $75 per fighter, alongside additional funds for procuring weapons locally.

Reportedly, in late July 2017, a small group of Israeli military and intelligence personnel, traveling in ambulances, made a tour of the west Daraa countryside and met with commanders from Jaydour Horan Brigade and Jaysh al-Ababil. According to another report, Israel held more than one meeting with the leaders of Fursan al-Joulan and Jaysh al-Ababil, during which they agreed on armaments, funding, the number and deployment of proposed Southern Army, and the purpose of its formation. Israel provided the faction leaders with weapons, including anti-armor weapons, and financed them to buy weapons and ammunition from the liberated areas in the south, including heavy artillery ammunition and Russian T55 and T62 tanks that the IDF does not have. The Israeli goal in forming this army was to remove the Iranian threat from the border area with the occupied Golan, and to ensure that fighters from the area would not be displaced, guarantees that Russia later provided to Israel and Jordan in exchange for allowing the regime to launch a military operation in the south to force the opposition to a "settlement."

In 2017, fighters from the group captured a Hezbollah operative named Marwan Awad Al‑Jaber, who had been commanding a local cell preparing to launch rockets into Israeli-controlled areas of the Golan Heights. The capture occurred in southern Syria, with other cell members also detained. A surviving video interview, published and analyzed by the Israeli Alma Research and Education Center, features Al‑Jaber detailing Hezbollah's "Golan File Unit" operations—an Iranian-backed network gathering intelligence and planning cross-border attacks targeting Israeli territory. In the footage, Al‑Jaber revealed that Hezbollah recruits local Syrian residents to facilitate access and cover, assigning area managers under Lebanese Hezbollah leadership. Their primary missions reportedly included preparing minefields, coordinating anti-tank and rocket attacks, gathering surveillance, and planning infiltration operations.

On 22 Jul 2018, the commander of Jaysh al-Ababil, Alaa al-Halaki, along with 3 other opposition commanders, have fled from Syrian territories with their families and were secured by Israeli military once they reached to the border line and settled in Israel.

On 30 March 2025, Jaysh al-Ababil's media wing posted the following message on its official X account: "On this blessed Eid al-Fitr, don't forget: He who breaks a covenant cannot be trusted, so don't let him control your wealth. Boycotting is a weapon... so don't abandon it in a moment of joy!" along a caricature depicting an Israeli soldier on a tank which is loaded with food and drinks, presumably portraying an Israeli humanitarian aid (Israel used to provide aid to the group and other Syrian opposition groups and tried to revive its humanitarian aids efforts in southern Syria following the fall of Assad regime and the subsequent Israeli invasion of southern Syria).

== See also ==
- List of armed groups in the Syrian Civil War
- South Lebanon Army
- Southern Syria clashes (July 2025–present)
- Other Israeli-supported Syrian rebel groups:
  - Southern Army (Syria)
  - Fursan al-Joulan
  - Firqat Ahrar Nawa
  - Saif al-Sham Brigade
  - Jaysh al-Ababil
  - Omar Bin Al-Khattab Brigade
  - Al-Ezz bin Abdul Salam
  - Al-Haramein Battalion
  - Jaydour Horan Brigade
  - Alwiya al-Furqan
  - Syrian Revolutionaries Front
  - Jabhat Ansar al-Islam
  - Ahrar Gathering
  - Abu Amara Brigades
  - Al-Nusra Front#Relations with Israel
