= September 1992 South Lebanon clashes =

- Part of the South Lebanon conflict (1985–2000)
Date	30 September 1992
Location	Tyre District, Lebanon
Result	Hezbollah victory: Israeli and SLA military positions successfully targeted by Hezbollah

Belligerents
South Lebanon Army; Israel	Hezbollah; Iran

Casualties and losses
- 9 killed, including 1 UNIFIL peacekeeper 1 UNIFIL peacekeeper injured

On the 30th of September 1992, a series of clashes in South Lebanon between Hezbollah and the South Lebanon Army killed 9 people, including one UNIFIL peacekeeper.

== Historical background ==
During the Lebanese Civil War, Hezbollah was among several militant groups formed in response to the Israeli invasion of southern Lebanon. Though chiefly funded by Iran, and later Syria, Hezbollah was believed to be receiving refuge from Lebanon.

When the Taif Agreement was created, it amended the Lebanese constitution to end the civil war, and disband all Lebanese militias. Argument then arose over whether Hezbollah's existence in Lebanon displayed a failure of the government, a blind eye, or clandestine support. Hezbollah launched a public relations campaign, political statements and a political program. As a result, the Lebanese government classified Hezbollah's military wing, the "Islamic Resistance" as a resistance movement and not as a militia. Thus, the organization was exempted from disbanding and disarming.

The Taif accord asked for an Israeli withdrawal based on UN Resolution 425 but explicitly allowed resistance against the Israeli occupation "by all means", including militarily. Hezbollah stated that it would continue to oppose Israeli occupation as a "resistance group", since they were actually protected by the agreement. Hassan Nasrallah, the Hezbollah secretary general, also declared that while the Taif Agreement was a cessation of the Lebanese Civil War, Hezbollah had never involved itself in that war, and only existed to fight the foreign troops stationed in the country.

== Events ==
Lebanese security officials and the Israeli military said the clashes took place on September 30, 1992, when guerrillas of Hezbollah attacked positions held by the pro-Israeli and IDF-backed militia, the South Lebanon Army.

The United Nations spokesman, Timor Goksel, said the fighting spread over a wide area east of Tyre. United Nations peacekeepers were also attacked, when they refused to allow Hezbollah gunmen through their checkpoint, he said. The attackers fired a rocket-propelled grenade at the checkpoint, killing one Irish peacekeeper and wounding another, he said.

The Islamic Resistance Movement led by Hezbollah said in a communique released here that its forces attacked a South Lebanon Army position early on September 30 in the Israeli-occupied security zone. The South Lebanon Army said in a statement that its soldiers repelled the attack.

== Casualties ==
On the 30 of September 1992, clashes in South Lebanon between Hezbollah and the South Lebanon Army killed 9 people, including one UNIFIL peacekeeper.

== Aftermath ==
In late June 1993, Hezbollah launched rockets at an Israeli village, and the following month attacks by both Hezbollah and the Popular Front for the Liberation of Palestine - General Command killed five Israel Defense Forces (IDF) soldiers inside the southern Lebanese occupied territory. These actions are generally considered to have been the catalyst for Operation Accountability.

== See also ==
- October 13 massacre
- Hezbollah
- Israel Defense Forces
- South Lebanon Army
- UNIFIL
- United Nations
- Popular Front for the Liberation of Palestine - General Command
