= Abu Hafs al-Masri Brigades =

The Abu Hafs al-Masri Brigades (Arabic: كتائب أبو حفص المصري), or Abu Hafs al-Masri Battalions, was a group which claims to be a branch of the Islamic fundamentalist organisation Al-Qaeda.

The group is named after a former policeman Mohammed Atef, aka Abu Hafs, of Egypt, who was a member of Ayman al-Zawahiri's al-Jihad al-Islami (Islamic Jihad). Al-Masri means "the Egyptian" in Arabic. He became a relative to Osama bin Laden, the al-Qaeda leader, after his daughter married bin Laden's son, Mohammed bin Laden. He was killed by U.S. airstrikes in Afghanistan in late 2001. He has been adopted as a "martyr" to the fundamentalist cause.

The group have not claimed any attacks since 2005 and is observed as defunct.

== Claimed attacks ==
The London-based Arabic language newspaper Al-Quds al-Arabi has received letters from this group, in which it has claimed responsibility for:

- the blackout of August 14, 2003 in the northeastern United States and Canada;
- the Canal Hotel bombing on the United Nations headquarters in Baghdad on August 19, 2003;
- the 2003 Istanbul bombings of two synagogues, the British consulate, and HSBC bank;
- the Marriott Hotel bombing in Jakarta, Indonesia in 2003;
- the 11 March 2004 Madrid attacks;
- a letter published July 2, 2004 endorsing the three months Al Qaeda ultimatum against Europe of April 14, 2004
- the bombings in London on July 7, 2005

== Credibility ==
There is no clearly defined stance on the existence of the Brigades can be discerned on the part of the jihadist radical community. By and large, terrorist organisations have disregarded their statements and avoided including any reference in their own messages that might be construed as representing support for the Brigades or, conversely, a desire to dismiss them as a fraud. This indifference has been shared even by those groups who claimed responsibility for an act of terrorism previously claimed by the Abu Hafs al-Masri Brigades. The group has merited mention by only a handful of radical preachers and even they have arrived at contradictory conclusions . For example, Omar Bakri, leader of the fundamentalist “al-Muhajiroun” group, stated that the claim of responsibility by the Brigades for the Madrid train bombings “was genuine”, whereas Abu Hamzah al-Masri, another of the London-based “preachers of hate”, denied that al-Qaeda (via the Brigades) could be behind “such a criminal act” and defended its position of never referring publicly to the Brigades because “sometimes they [al-Qaeda] leave people to speak whatever they want to speak for, as long as they support them and they try to get the people around them”.

At least some of these claims are regarded as being false. The August 2003 power failure in the US, which the group called Operation Quick Lightning in the Land of the Tyrant of This Generation has been shown to be caused by a large-scale technical failure rather than terrorist actions. Turkey claims that the Kurdish Hezbollah was responsible for the Istanbul bombings while the UN headquarters in Baghdad was blamed on Ba’athists. The Jakarta bombing was carried out by Jemaah Islamiya, an Indonesian group, according to Indonesian and US officials.

The group's involvement with the March 11, 2004 attacks is also uncertain; Spain originally pointed the finger for the train bombings at the terrorist group ETA, although it later transpired that Islamist militants were behind it.

According to the group's letter to Al-Quds, it calls the attacks "The Trains of Death Operation". It also claims that it has completed 90% of the preparation for a new attack on the US, which it calls Winds of Black Death. The name is speculated to come from Iraq's use of poison gas on Kurds – which Physicians for Human Rights has named the "Winds of Death" – and the black skin lesions on anthrax victims.

Some are skeptical if this group actually exists. The only hard evidence is through communiqués, usually sent via the Internet, to the Al-Quds al-Arabi newspaper in the UK. Another previously unknown group calling itself the Lions of Al-Mufridun also has decided to claim credit for the Madrid attack, perhaps attempting to copy Abu Hafs al-Masri Brigades.
