= Al-Quds Al-Arabi =

Arabic-language newspaper published in the UK

Al-Quds al-Arabi القدس العربي

- Cover page of 12 January 2011
- Type: Daily newspaper
- Format: Broadsheet
- Owner(s): Al-Quds Al-Arabi Publishing and Advertising (Overseas) Ltd.
- Editor: Sana Aloul
- Founded: 1989; 37 years ago
- Political alignment: Independent, pan-Arab
- Language: Arabic
- Headquarters: London
- Circulation: 15,000–50,000 (estimated)
- Website: alquds.co.uk

Al-Quds al-Arabi (Arabic: القدس العربي, romanized: al-Quds al-ʿArabī, lit. 'The Arab Jerusalem') is an independent pan-Arab daily newspaper, published in London since 1989 and owned by Palestinian expatriates. According to news reports in 2013, it is now owned by Qatar media interests, through intermediaries. The paper's motto is yawmiyyah siyāsiyyah mustaqillah (يومية سياسية مستقلة), "daily, political, independent". Its circulation is estimated to be somewhere between 15,000 and 50,000. From the start until his resignation in July 2013, its editor-in-chief was Abdel Bari Atwan, who was born in a Palestinian refugee camp in the Gaza Strip in 1950. After his resignation in July 2013, Atwan was followed by Sana Aloul, a London-based Palestinian journalist.

The paper publishes many Arab writers. It positions itself as an objective newspaper, (Note: Abdel Bari Atwan is said to have claimed this reputation from his appearances as an expert in the Western news outlets.) covering the latest news and events. Al-Quds al-Arabi states that its "correspondents and writers are biased toward people’s and human rights issues, including women's, children's and refugees' rights. It rejects sectarianism, violence and discrimination". It exposes corruption, violations, racism and practices of oppressive regimes. It advocates for the rights of the Palestinian people and opposes the sanctioned policies of the Israeli occupation. As indicated by its motto, the paper stresses this distinction by emphasizing its independent ownership and viewpoint relative to the other pan-Arab dailies.

== History ==
Al-Quds al-Arabi was founded in April 1989 as the international edition of the Palestinian daily al-Quds and is based in the Hammersmith district of London. While the initial funding was reportedly provided by the Palestine Liberation Organization, the paper then received support from a variety of political circles in the Arab world, including Iraq and Sudan, before the Qatari government began to subsidise it, possibly as early as 1998. The paper first came to global attention after Atwan traveled to Afghanistan in 1996 to interview Osama bin Laden. Like Al-Jazeera, contacts with militia groups such as al-Qaeda have consistently stirred attention and controversy in the West toward Atwan and the paper, particularly in the immediate aftermath of 9/11.

The fatāwā of Osama bin Laden in 1996 were first published by the paper. On the fifth anniversary of the 9/11 attacks, Atwan wrote: "The events of 11 September will be remembered as the end of the US empire. This is because all empires collapse when they pursue the arrogance of power." However, Atwan explicitly condemned terrorist attacks on innocent Western civilians, as he wrote in one of his two books, The Secret History of al Qa'ida: "I do not endorse or in any way support al-Qaeda's agenda" and "I utterly condemn the attacks on innocent citizens in the West". The paper later published and vouched for the credibility of letters from the alleged successor group to al-Qaeda, the Abu Hafs al-Masri Brigades, active until 2005.

Atwan unexpectedly left the paper as its chairman and editor-in-chief on 10 July 2013 and Sana Aloul became the editor-in-chief. The exact reason for Atwan's sudden departure isn't publicly known, but he stated: "We had on-going and never-ending financial problems whose resolution, ultimately, required political compromises that I was not able to make. Sacrificing professional integrity, our independent editorial line and the space we allowed for free comment were red lines I could not cross."

== Organization ==
The paper is owned and published by Muʾassasat al-Quds al-ʿArabī li-n-Nashr wa-l-Iʿlān (مؤسسة القدس العربي للنشر والاعلان), "The Al-Quds Al-Arabi Foundation for Publishing and Media". The only editor listed on the masthead was editor-in-chief Abd al-Bari Atwan. The newspaper is printed in London, New York City, and Frankfurt, and then circulated in Europe, the Middle East, North Africa, and North America. In addition to London, the paper has offices in Cairo, Rabat, and Amman.

=== Content ===
The paper is 20 pages in length. The first half or so of the paper is devoted to political news from around the world, with a focus on what it terms Arab affairs. Its reporting was normally based on anonymous sources, and it was unusual in dedicating a page to translations from the Israeli press, in line with its particular focus on Arab–Israeli relations. It received press releases directly from al-Qaeda and benefitted from its chief editor Atwan's privileged access to members of the organisation. The paper also has sections devoted to cultural news and other miscellaneous items, as well as business (2 pages) and sports sections (1 page). The paper devotes three pages to op-ed writing, divided into what it calls Manbar al-Quds (منبر القدس) "The Al-Quds Pulpit" (a forum for reader submission), Mudārāt (مدارات) "Orbits" (or trends), and Raʾy (رأي) "Opinion". The paper devotes more space to opinion and less space to business news and sports, as compared with competitors like Al-Hayat or Asharq Al-Awsat. Additionally, Abd al-Bari Atwan wrote a well-known opinion column, featured prominently on the front page until his leave on 10 July 2013.

=== Circulation ===
Circulation data for Arab media is based on estimates, which vary widely for Al-Quds al-Arabi. Former American diplomat and media scholar William Rugh estimated the paper's circulation around 15,000 in 2004 which is also stated by Arab Reform Bulletin. More recent estimates cite significantly higher circulation numbers of around 50,000. By point of comparison, rival London-based Arabic press such as Al-Hayat and Asharq Al-Awsat are generally estimated in the 200,000 to 300,000 range. According to a Washington Institute for Near East Policy report, al-Quds al-Arabi mostly circulated in London, New York and Frankfurt.

== Reputation ==
Marc Lynch of Foreign Policy called Al-Quds Al-Arabi "the most populist/'rejection camp' of the major Arab papers". It is often paired with Asharq Al-Awsat to represent the polar extremes in the pan-Arab press.

== See also ==
- Al-Quds newspaper
- Asharq Al-Awsat
- Quds News Network
- History of Palestinian journalism
