= Alwiya al-Furqan =

Syrian Islamist rebel group

Criterion Brigades
- Alwiya al-Furqan
- Logo of Alwiya al-Furqan
- Leader: Muhammad Majid al-Khatib
- Dates active: 2012-2018
- Active regions: Quneitra Governorate (formerly); Damascus Governorate (formerly); Daraa Governorate (formerly); Idlib Governorate; Aleppo Governorate
- Ideology: Sunni Islamism; Jihadism
- Size: ~2,000
- Part of: (Syrian opposition) Free Syrian Army; (Syrian opposition) Southern Front; Tajammu Ansar al-Islam (formerly); Fatah Halab (formerly)

Alwiya al-Furqan or Al-Furqan Brigades (Arabic: ألوية الفرقان, Criterion Brigades) was an Islamist rebel group involved in the Syrian Civil War. It claimed to be the largest Islamist rebel faction that operated in the eastern Quneitra Governorate and Damascus. The group also held ties with Jordan which allowed fighters from the group to cross into the country to receive medical aid.

== History ==
In May 2013, after the split between the al-Nusra Front and Islamic State of Iraq after the latter's refusal of a merger between the two and establishment of the Islamic State of Iraq and the Levant, the group released a statement critical of al-Nusra's leader Abu Mohammad al-Joulani for his pledge of allegiance to al-Qaeda in light of the dispute.

In 2013, after a chemical weapons attack in Eastern Ghouta, ISIL and al-Nusra conducted separate revenge attacks, Alwiya al-Furqa, Ahrar al-Sham and the Jesus Son of Mary Battalions joined the ISIL-led attacks which were code named "Volcano of Rage", and shelled Alawite neighborhoods in Damascus, areas near the Embassy of Russia in Damascus and the Four Seasons Hotel Damascus, where UN observers were reportedly staying to investigate the chemical attack.

In September 2013, the group joined a joint operations room with Ahrar al-Sham and Jaysh al-Islam.

In 2017 the group released a statement saying the group would end its cease-fire with the Syrian government in Damascus if Hezbollah or IRGC affiliated groups entered the area.

== Israeli cooperation ==
In June 2013, Abu Jaafar, spokesman of Al-Furqan Brigades and the Quneitra Liberation Gathering, said on Al Jazeera TV that if Israeli forces enter Syria, they will stand away from any clashes with Israeli forces, do nothing, and leave the confrontation to Assad's forces.

In February 2014, a Syrian activist told France 24 that Israel coordinates the transfer of wounded Syrian fighters and civilians to Israeli hospitals "with the armed opposition which is affiliated with the Al-Furqan Brigades and two civil society coordinators from the areas of Beer Ajam and Jubata al-Khashab, where the only crossings into Israeli territory are located".

In April 2017, Lebanese newspaper Al-Akhbar described Al-Furqan Brigades as "another arm of the Israeli Military Intelligence Division (Aman)". According to the information provided, the brigade is led by Mohammed al-Khatib from the town of Kanaker, nicknamed "Clinton", it's numbered about 1,200 fighters, including the militants of Jubata al-Khashab, Naba' al-Sakhr, and the villages of Daraa and Quneitra, who receive salaries ranging from $100 to 65,000 Syrian pounds, and other kinds of aid.

In September 2018, a Syrian opposition fighter told Tablet Magazine that the various fighting units of the opposition forces designated a representative from Al-Furqan Brigades, named Abu-Diaa, and that he coordinated the transfer of wounded men from Syria to Israeli hospitals. The fighter added that ahead of battles with the regime, his group would send Israel detailed requests for ammunition through the Syrian coordinators and that Israel would habitually reply with offers of money for rebels to purchase arms in the free market, where very little ammunition existed, and complained that Israel did nothing but hedged its bets in case the opposition somehow prevailed over Assad.

According to a 2018 investigation by Foreign Policy, Israel supported at least 12 rebel groups by providing them with humanitarian aid, medical treatments, logistical support and military transfers which included assault rifles, machine guns, mortar launchers and transport vehicles. Israel also transferred cash in the form of salaries of $75 per fighter, alongside additional funds for procuring weapons locally.

== See also ==
- South Lebanon Army
- Southern Syria clashes (July 2025–present)
- List of armed groups in the Syrian Civil War
