= South Lebanon Army =

Lebanese Christian-dominated militia (1977–2000)

- جيش لبنان الجنوبي
- Flag of the South Lebanon Army (1984–2000)
- Founding leader: Saad Haddad (1977–1984)
- Leader: Antoine Lahad (1984–2000)
- Dates active: October 1977 – May 2000
- Split from: Army of Free Lebanon
- Headquarters: Marjayoun, Lebanon
- Active regions: Southern Lebanon, Tyre, Sidon, Jabal Amel, West Beirut
- Ideology: Lebanese nationalism Secularism; Multiconfessionalism; Muslim-Christian Unity; Anti-communism; Factions: Anti-Palestinian sentiment Zionism; Maronite interests
- Political position: Right-wing
- Status: Disbanded in May 2000
- Size: c. 5,000 (early 1980s) c. 2,200 (1984) c. 3,000 (early 1990s)
- Wars: Lebanese Civil War; South Lebanon conflict (1985–2000)

The South Lebanon Army (SLA; Arabic: جيش لبنان الجنوبي, romanized: Jayš Lubnān al-Janūbiyy), also known as the Lahad Army (جيش لحد) or as the De Facto Forces (DFF), was a Lebanese Christian-dominated rebel paramilitary organization founded by Lebanese military officer Saad Haddad in 1977, during the Lebanese Civil War. Initially formed as a splinter rebel group when it broke away from the Army of Free Lebanon (a Christian splinter rebel faction founded and led by former Lebanese army officers), it evolved to operate as a paramilitary during the South Lebanon conflict, basing itself in Haddad's unrecognized State of Free Lebanon. Officially secular, the army was a multi-confessional force composed of Christians, Druze, and Shia, the latter of whom made up a substantial share of its ranks, estimated at around 30 percent and in some accounts as high as half of its fighters.

Initially, it was known as the "Free Lebanon Army," and after 1979, the SLA's activity was almost exclusively confined to southernmost Lebanon. Under the aegis of Israel, the SLA was bolstered by the 1982 Lebanon War. It came under increasing Israeli supervision following the collapse of the State of Free Lebanon in 1984 and subsequent establishment of the South Lebanon security belt administration.

As the most prominent pro-Israel faction in Israeli-occupied Lebanon, the SLA frequently engaged in armed clashes with Hezbollah, the Palestine Liberation Organization, and other militant groups.

After Israeli forces withdrew from Lebanon on 22 May 2000, the SLA positions collapsed in the face of Lebanese civilians and Hezbollah's advance towards South Lebanon and Saad Haddad's statue was dragged through the streets of Marjayoun. SLA members either fled to Israel, constituting Lebanese people in Israel, or were captured and tried for treason.

== History ==
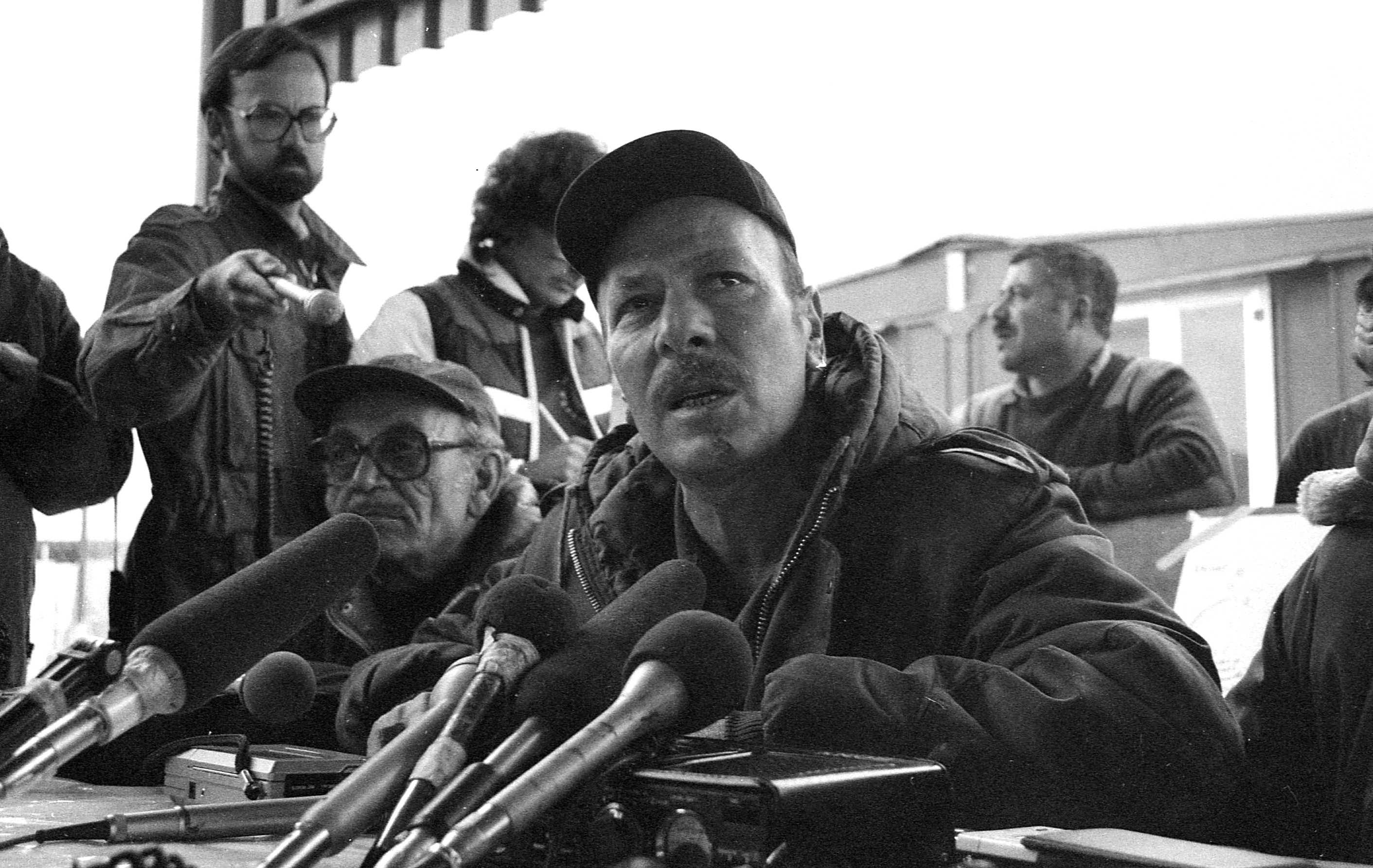
Colonel Saad Haddad holding a press conference, 19 November 1981.

In 1975, at the town of Marjayoun in the Jabal Amel region of southern Lebanon, some local 300 Kataeb Regulatory Forces (KRF) and Guardians of the Cedars (GoC) militiamen were mustered together into the so-called "Free Lebanese Militia" – FLM (Arabic: Al-Milishia Al-Lubnaniyyat Al-Hura), ostensibly formed to defend the nearby Christian towns of Kfar Falous, Jezzine, Qlaiaa, Ain Ebel, Rumeish and surrounding villages threatened by Palestine Liberation Organization (PLO) and later by Lebanese Arab Army (LAA) attacks. In reality, the muster was secretly carried by Lieutenant Ya'ir Ravid of the AMAN (the Israeli military intelligence service), who envisaged using them as a buffer force to prevent a Palestinian military build-up in the border area that could threaten the security of northern Israel. A second muster took place at Qlaiaa in early 1976, gathering a force of some 400 Christian soldiers – mostly deserters from the Lebanese Army and Tigers Militia' militants – led by Major Sami Shidyaq, a Phalange militant.

In January 1976, as a result of the ongoing civil war, the Lebanese Army began to break up into two rival factions, the Muslim-led Lebanese Arab Army (LAA) who sided with the Muslim-leftist militias of the Lebanese National Movement (LNM) and their allies of the PLO guerrilla factions, and the Christian-led Army of Free Lebanon (AFL) aligned with the Christian-rightist militias of the Lebanese Front. Some Christian Lebanese Army officers commanding units based throughout the country joined the AFL with their men, including Major Saad Haddad, the commander of the 700-strong Marjayoun garrison in southern Lebanon.

By late 1976, pressure from PLO and LNM-LAA militias finally forced Major Saad Haddad to evacuate the town and withdraw unopposed with his battalion to the village of Qlaiaa, close to the border with Israel. Here Maj. Haddad and his men placed themselves under the protection of the Israel Defense Forces (IDF), eventually providing the cadre – after merging with the local Christian FLM, Shia Muslim and Druze militias, gathered since October 21, 1976, into the informal "Army for the Defense of South Lebanon" or ADSL (French: Armée de Défense du Liban-Sud or ADLS) – of the so-called "Free Lebanese Army" (FLA), formed in March 1978 under the auspices of another AMAN officer, reserve Major Yoram Hamizrachi.

Primarily based at the towns of Marjayoun and Qlaiaa in southern Lebanon, and provisionally headquartered at the Hotel Arazim in Metula, Israel, the 1,200-strong FLA/SLA was initially placed under the overall command of Hamizrachi himself. In June 1978, Major Hamizrachi handed over the post to Major (later, Colonel) Saad Haddad, in turn replaced upon his death from Cancer in January 1984 by another ex-LAF Officer, retired Lieutenant general Antoine Lahad, who was also a NLP sympathiser.

The new FLA fought against various groups including the Palestine Liberation Organization (PLO), the Amal Movement and (after the 1982 Israeli invasion of Lebanon) the emerging Hezbollah. While the group was no longer under the direct control of the Lebanese Army command, from 1976 to 1979 its members were still receiving their pay from the Lebanese central government.

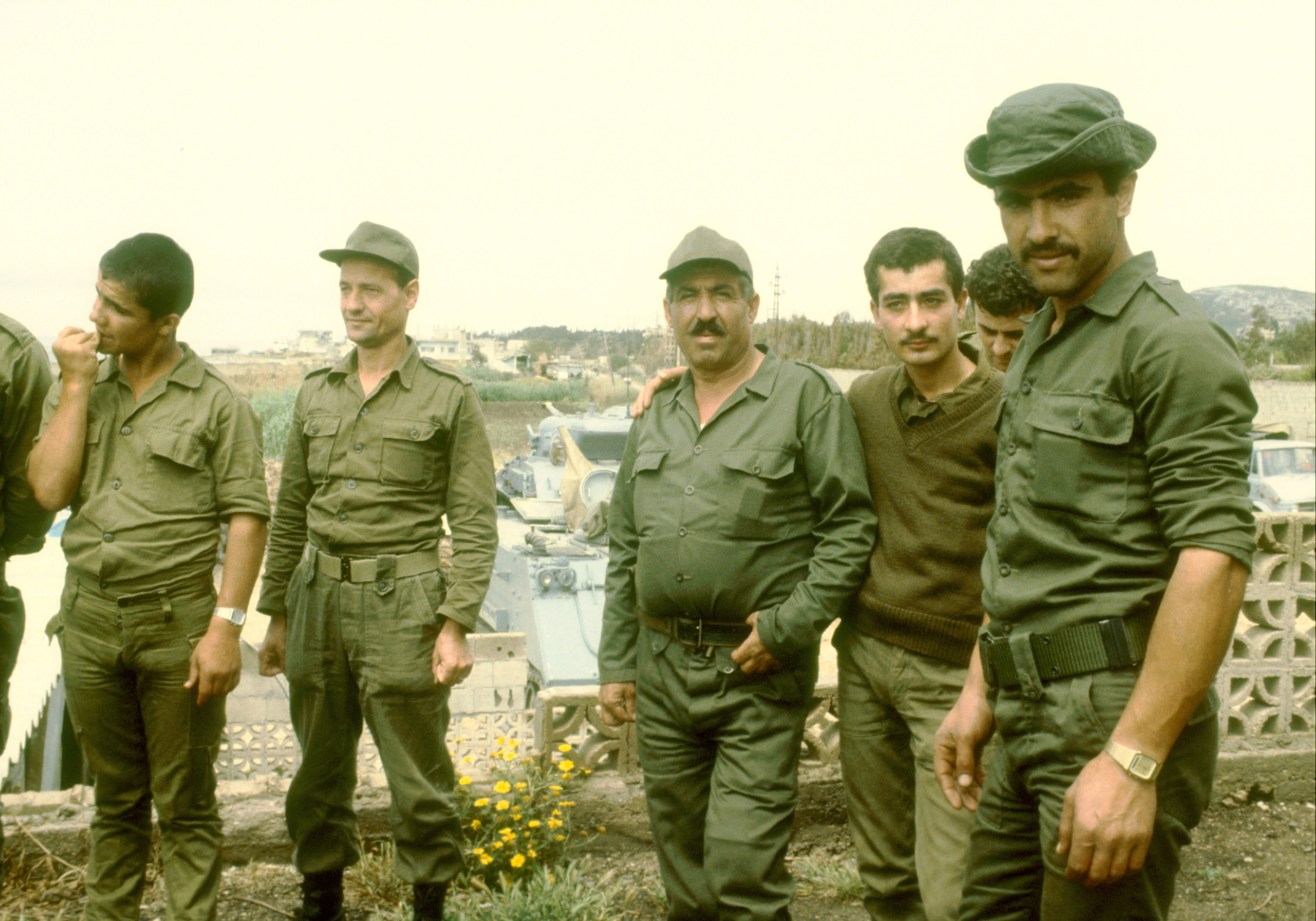
South Lebanon Army (Christian Militia) soldiers on Patrol along the Lebanese border in 1977 (Dan Hadani Collection)

The 1978 Israeli invasion allowed the Free Lebanon Army to gain control over a much wider area in southern Lebanon. On April 18, 1979, Haddad proclaimed the area controlled by his force the "Independent Free Lebanon". The following day, he was branded a traitor by the Lebanese government and officially dismissed from the Lebanese Army under presidential decree No. 1924. Part of the Army of Free Lebanon returned to government control, while Haddad's part split away and was renamed the South Lebanon Army (SLA) in May 1980. In 1982, soldiers from the SLA were reported to have aided in the LF led Sabra and Shatila massacre. Though Haddad's men were cleared by an Israeli panel for the massacre, SLA militiamen were known to still engage in brutality. Following Haddad's death from cancer in 1984, he was replaced as leader by retired Lieutenant General Antoine Lahad.

In 1984 SLA militiamen were paid $300 a month. The SLA was closely allied with Israel. It supported the Israelis by fighting the PLO in southern Lebanon until the 1982 invasion. After that, SLA support for the Israelis consisted mainly of fighting other Lebanese guerrilla forces led by Hezbollah until 2000 in the "security zone" (the area under occupation after a partial Israeli withdrawal in 1985). In return, Israel supplied the organization with arms, uniforms, and logistical equipment.

The SLA hosted the Christian radio station Voice of Hope (established and funded by George Otis, founder of High Adventure Ministries). Beginning in 1982, the SLA played host to Middle East Television (which was also established, funded, and operated by High Adventure Ministries). Otis gave Middle East Television (METV) to Televangelist Pat Robertson, founder of CBN. On May 2, 2000, Middle East Television relocated to Cyprus.

In 1985 the SLA opened the Khiam detention center. Torture was a common tactic, and occurred on a large scale. Israel denies any involvement, and claims that Khiam was the sole responsibility of the SLA; this has been contested by human rights organizations such as Amnesty International. The SLA also imposed military conscription, under which males over 18 living in the territory it controlled served one year as military recruits. While the SLA received funding, weapons, and logistics from Israel during its existence, the SLA did much fighting independent from Israeli forces. The SLA also handled all civilian governmental operations in Israel's zone of control.

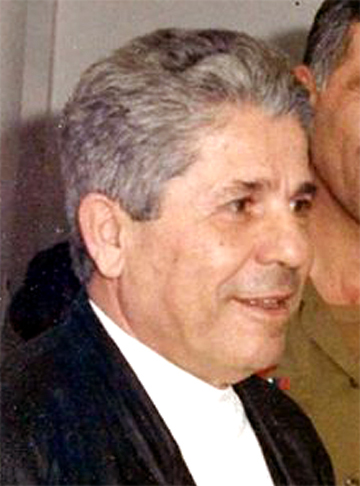
Antoine Lahad in 1988.

During the 1990s Hezbollah carried out increasingly effective attacks on the SLA, aided in later years by Lebanese army intelligence which had infiltrated it. These changed circumstances led to a progressive loss of morale and members. In 1997, Israel maintained approximately 1,000 to 1,200 troops in southern Lebanon and supported another 2,000 in the SLA. By 2000 the SLA was reduced to 1,500 soldiers, compared to 3,000 ten years earlier. At its peak during the early 1980s, the SLA was composed of over 5,000 soldiers.

== Israeli withdrawal, SLA collapse, and surrender ==
The increase in Israeli casualties in Lebanon over the previous few years led to growing domestic pressure for an end to Israel's military presence in Lebanon. Ehud Barak's Labor Party pledged during his March 1999 election campaign for Prime Minister to withdraw Israeli troops from Lebanon by July 2000. Barak won a victory in the May 1999 elections.

On 1 June 1999, the South Lebanon Army began dismantling its TV station and headquarters in Jezzine. In the following two weeks they withdrew from the town and thirty six surrounding villages. Retreating SLA members and their families commandeered empty houses in Marjayun, Ibl al-Saqi and Kawkaba in the Indian UNIFIL zone. At the time it was estimated that the SLA had only four hundred men.

On March 5, 2000, the Israeli cabinet voted unanimously for a full troop withdrawal from Lebanon by July. The expectation then was that such a withdrawal would be part of an agreement with Lebanon and Syria; however, negotiations with Syria broke down. On May 22, Israeli forces unilaterally began handing over their forward positions in the occupied zone to the SLA. As the chaotic nature of the withdrawal became obvious, civilians from the zone overran SLA positions to return to their occupied villages while Hezbollah guerrillas quickly took control of areas previously controlled by the SLA. The SLA in the central sector of the security zone collapsed in the face of the civilians and Hezbollah's rapid advance. The next day, SLA forward positions in the eastern sector collapsed and Israeli forces began their general withdrawal from the remaining areas of the security zone. With the Israeli withdrawal, the SLA collapsed totally. The withdrawal was complete on Wednesday, May 24, 2000; the sight of Saad Haddad's statue being dragged through the streets of the Lebanese town of Marjayoun was a sure sign that the South Lebanon Army was gone.

As the Israeli withdrawal rapidly progressed, SLA militiamen were left with few choices. The Lebanese government, Hezbollah and many civilians in the area considered them traitors and collaborators. In addition, they were told that Israel's border would be closed after the withdrawal. Many were terrified of being captured (and possibly killed) by Hezbollah guerrillas or vengeful mobs, or being jailed or executed by the Lebanese government.

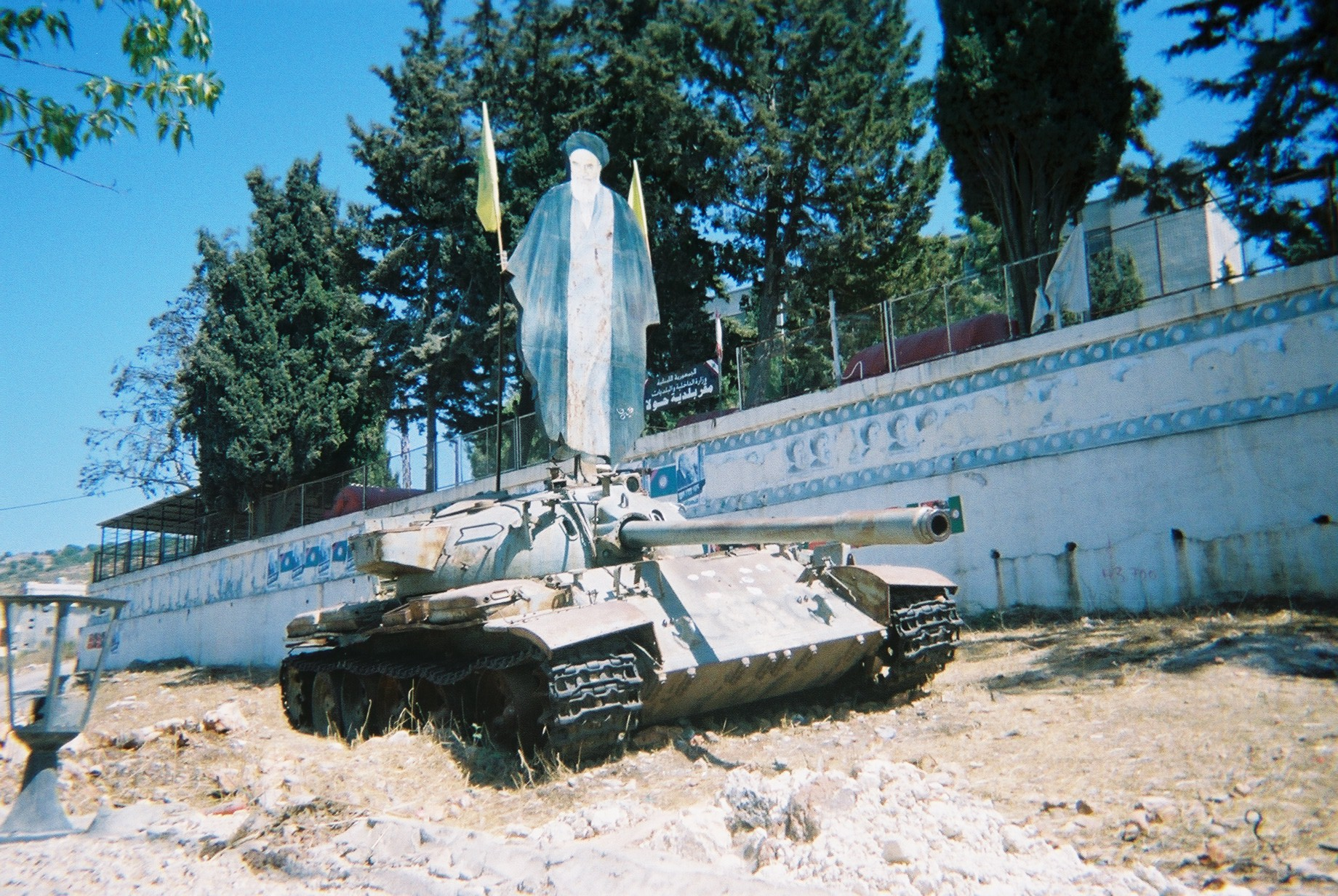
Captured SLA tank with wooden portrait of the late Ayatollah Khomeini (now on display in Hula, Lebanon)

Many members of the SLA (including some with their families) fled to Israel; the Christian majority feared being suspected of serious offences committed by SLA members, and a number of members were reportedly granted asylum in European countries (primarily Germany). Others who remained in Lebanon surrendered to authorities or were captured by Hezbollah and handed over to the police. SLA members captured by Lebanon and Hezbollah were tried by Lebanese military courts for treason.

Israeli prime minister Ehud Barak was criticized in Israel by the Jewish settler movement on the grounds that his decision to withdraw without consulting his SLA allies led to the speed and confusion of its collapse. Hezbollah was criticized for preventing the arrest of some members of the SLA; it justified this on the grounds that it was in a position to know who among them had been informants.

By the next month (June 2000), 3,000 former SLA members were in the custody of the Lebanese government; by the end of the year, about 90 percent had been tried in military courts. It has been estimated that a third of the SLA members were sentenced to less than a month and another third received one-year sentences. Two members of the SLA accused of torture at Al-Khiam prison received life sentences. The death penalty was recommended for 21 SLA members, but in each case the military reduced the sentence. Certain other individuals were barred from returning to Southern Lebanon for a number of years.

Of those who initially fled to Israel, many SLA members and their families eventually chose to return to Lebanon after Hezbollah promised they would not be harmed. Others accepted Israel's offer of full citizenship and a financial package similar to that granted new immigrants, and settled permanently in Israel. On April 6, 2006, the Israeli Knesset Finance Committee approved the payment of 40,000 shekels per family to SLA veterans, payable over seven years. Many of the SLA fighters who settled in Israel later moved to the United States and Europe. Approximately 6,500 SLA fighters and family members moved to Israel, of whom 2,700 remained in the country permanently. They are mainly concentrated in Nahariya, Kiryat Shmona, Tiberias, Ma'alot-Tarshiha, and Haifa. As of 2021, there are 3,500 Lebanese in Israel, former SLA members and their families.

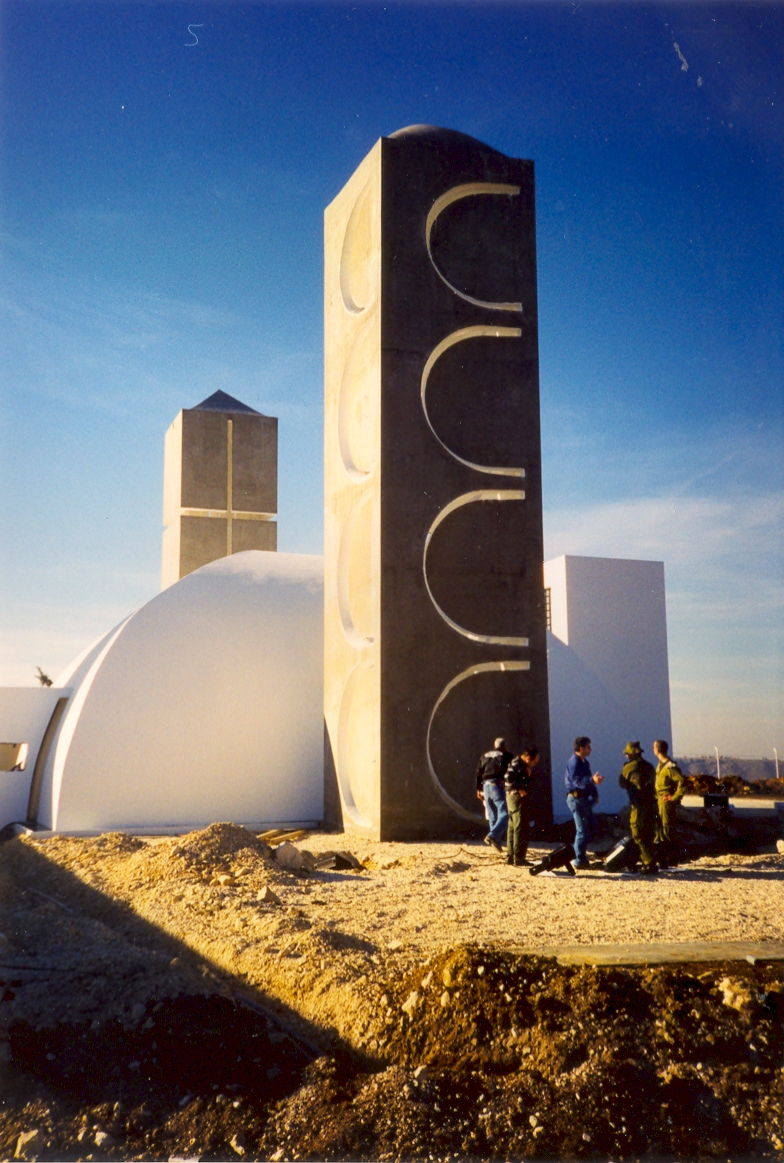
South Lebanon Army memorial in Marjayoun

Israel continues to host the Government of Free Lebanon, on whose behalf the SLA had operated. The Government of Free Lebanon has operated from Jerusalem since 2000, and still claims to be the true government of Lebanon.

== Field organization ==
The SLA was organized into two regions (western and eastern), each with its own infantry brigade. Each brigade consisted of three battalion-sized infantry regiments; the strength of support included several heavy-artillery batteries (155 and 130mm), subdivided into the infantry battalions as needed. There was also an armored regiment of 55 tanks.

This force occupied 46 locations along the front (from Naqoura in the west to the eastern slopes of Mount Hermon), while the Israeli Army had 11 centers, mostly in the rear lines.

The SLA Security Service consisted of 250 officers and men, tasked with:

- Counter-espionage by outside forces
- Border security

The service included field and intelligence officers, investigators, intelligence analysts, administrative personnel, security officers and guards.

== List of SLA commanders ==
- Major (later, Colonel) Saad Haddad (1977–1984)
- Lieutenant general Antoine Lahad (1984–2000)

=== SLA Chiefs-of-Staff ===
- Major Karamallah Said – also the commander of the Eastern Sector of the Security Zone and Deputy Commander of the SLA.

=== SLA junior commanders ===
- Sergeant (later, Lieutenant colonel) Aql Hashem – Commander of the Western Sector of the Security Zone and head of the SLA's Security Service.
- Major Emil Nasr – Commander of the Jezzine Sector of the Security Zone.
- Major Michel Nahra – head of the SLA's Secretariat.
- Captain Maroun Abu Rizq – head of the SLA's Treasury Department.
- Captain Fouad Shadid – head of the SLA's Military Intelligence Department.
- Captain Ghazi al-Dawi – head of the SLA's Military Police Corps.
- Captain 'Id Musallam – head of the SLA's Military Security Department.
- Major Samir al-Shufi – head of the SLA's Operations Department.
- Captain Khayrallah al-Tuhayli – head of the SLA's Logistics Brigade.
- Major Salamah Sulayman – head of the SLA's Ordnance Corps.
- Captain Hanna Salamah – head of the SLA's Engineering Corps.
- Major Christian Istifan – head of the SLA's Medical Corps.
- Captain Ghassan Nimah – head of the SLA's Signal Corps.
- Captain Daniel Khouri – head of the SLA's Training Department.
- Captain Jean Humsi – head of the SLA's Prisons Department.
- Captain Jiryis Nawfal – head of the SLA's Artillery Corps.
- Captain Ilyas Salamah Najm – head of the SLA's Armoured Corps.

== Weapons and equipment ==
=== Vehicles ===
- Sherman M-48 tanks
- T-54 tanks
- M-30 half-track troop carriers
- M-113 armored vehicles

=== Artillery ===
- 155-mm howitzer field artillery
- 122-mm howitzer field artillery
- 107-mm launchers
- Many types of mortars

=== Machine guns ===
- MAC
- BKC
- M-16
- Galilee

== Uniforms and insignia ==
The SLA’s uniforms were provided by Israel, and were identical to ones worn by the IDF, with the only distinguishing feature being the insignia. Civilians were often forced to use context clues, such as the fact that IDF soldiers only travelled in convoys instead of lone vehicles, in order to distinguish SLA militiamen from Israeli soldiers.

== See also ==
- List of extrajudicial killings and political violence in Lebanon
- Southern Army (Syria)
- Army of Free Lebanon (AFL)
- Lebanese National Resistance Front (Jammoul)
- Lebanese Arab Army (LAA)
- Lebanese Armed Forces (LAF)
- Lebanese Forces (militia)
- Lebanese National Movement (LNM)
- Lebanese Front
- Lebanese in Israel
- List of weapons of the Lebanese Civil War
- Sabra and Shatila massacre
- South Lebanon conflict (1985–2000)
- Tigers Militia
- United Nations Interim Force in Lebanon (UNIFIL)
- 1978 South Lebanon conflict
- 1982 Lebanon War

== Bibliography ==
- Ahron Bregman, Israel's Wars: A History Since 1947, Routledge, London 2002. ISBN 0-415-28716-2
- Alain Menargues, Les Secrets de la guerre du Liban: Du coup d'état de Béchir Gémayel aux massacres des camps palestiniens, Albin Michel, Paris 2004. ISBN 978-2226121271 (in French)
- Anthony Tucker-Jones, Images of War: T–54/55, The Soviet Army's Cold War main battle tank – rare photographs from wartime archives, Pen & Sword Military, Barnsley 2017. ISBN 978 1 47389 109 8
- Beate Hamizrachi, The Emergence of South Lebanon Security Belt, Praeger, New York 1984. ISBN 978-0-275-92854-4
- Dan Bavly & Eliahu Salpeter, Fire in Beirut: Israel's War in Lebanon with the PLO, Stein & Day, New York 1984. ISBN 978-0-8128-2924-2
- Edgar O'Ballance, Civil War in Lebanon, 1975–92, Palgrave Macmillan, London 1998. ISBN 0-333-72975-7
- Farid El-Khazen, The Breakdown of the State in Lebanon 1967–1976, I.B. Tauris, London 2000. ISBN 0-674-08105-6 –
- Fawwaz Traboulsi, Identités et solidarités croisées dans les conflits du Liban contemporain; Chapitre 12: L'économie politique des milices: le phénomène mafieux, Thèse de Doctorat d'Histoire – 1993, Université de Paris VIII, 2007. (in French) –
- Frédéric Domont and Walid Charrara, Le Hezbollah: un mouvement Islamo-nationaliste, Éditions Fayard, Paris 2004. ISBN 2-213-62009-1 (in French)
- Harald List, Ein Land im Fadenkreuz: Der Südlibanon zwischen Armeen und Milizen, Freiburg (o.D., ca. 1991) (in German)
- Harald List and Antoine Lahad, in ORIENT 2/88 S. pp. 179–187.
- Jago Salmon, Massacre and Mutilation: Understanding the Lebanese Forces through their use of violence, Workshop on the 'techniques of Violence in Civil War', PRIO, Oslo, August 20–21, 2004. –
- Joseph A. Kechichian, The Lebanese Army: Capabilities and Challenges in the 1980s, Conflict Quarterly, Winter 1985.
- Joseph Hokayem, L'armée libanaise pendant la guerre: un instrument du pouvoir du président de la République (1975–1985), Lulu.com, Beyrouth 2012. ISBN 9781291036602, 1291036601 (in French) –
- Judith Palmer-Harek: Hezbollah: the Changing Face of Terrorism, I.B. Tauris, London 2003. ISBN 978-1845110246
- Marius Deeb, The Lebanese Civil War, Praeger Publishers Inc., New York 1980. ISBN 978-0030397011
- Moustafa El-Assad, Blue Steel: T-55 tanks in South Lebanon, Blue Steel books, Sidon 2006. ASIN B000JEI5ZY
- Moustafa El-Assad, Blue Steel 2: M-3 Halftracks in South Lebanon, Blue Steel books, Sidon 2006. ASIN B001F8Q0X2
- Moustafa El-Assad, Blue Steel III: M-113 Carriers in South Lebanon, Blue Steel books, Sidon 2007. ASIN B001F8OPZW
- Moustafa El-Assad, Blue Steel IV: M-50 Shermans and M-50 APCs in South Lebanon, Blue Steel books, Sidon 2007. ASIN B0011X4YIY
- Moustafa El-Assad, Civil Wars Volume 1: The Gun Trucks, Blue Steel books, Sidon 2008. ISBN 9789953012568
- Nicholas Blanford, Rob Shapiro, et al., Warriors of God, Inside Hezbollah's Thirty-Year Struggle Against Israel, Random House, New York 2011. ISBN 978-1400068364
- Oren Barak, The Lebanese Army: A National institution in a divided society, State University of New York Press, Albany 2009. ISBN 978-0-7914-9345-8 –
- Samuel M. Katz and Ron Volstad, Battleground Lebanon (1003), Concord Publications, Hong Kong 1990. ISBN 962-361-003-3
- Samuel M. Katz, Lee E. Russel, and Ron Volstad, Armies in Lebanon 1982–84, Men-at-arms series 165, Osprey Publishing Ltd, London 1985. ISBN 0-85045-602-9
- Samuel M. Katz and Ron Volstad, Arab Armies of the Middle East Wars 2, Men-at-arms series 194, Osprey Publishing Ltd, London 1988. ISBN 0-85045-800-5
- Samer Kassis, 30 Years of Military Vehicles in Lebanon, Beirut: Elite Group, 2003. ISBN 9953-0-0705-5
- Samer Kassis, Véhicules Militaires au Liban/Military Vehicles in Lebanon 1975–1981, Trebia Publishing, Chyah 2012. ISBN 978-9953-0-2372-4
- Samer Kassis, Les TIRAN 4 et 5, de Tsahal aux Milices Chrétiennes (1960–1990), Trucks & Tanks Magazine No. 50, July–August 2015, Caraktère, Aix-en-Provence, pp. 54–61. ISSN 1957-4193 (in French)
- Samer Kassis, Tiran in Lebanese Wars (Ammo_A.MIG-6000), AMMO of Mig Jimenez S.L., 2018. ASIN B00KFUXRGE
- Steven J. Zaloga, Armour of the Middle East Wars 1948–78, Vanguard series 19, Osprey Publishing Ltd, London 1981. ISBN 0 85045 388 7
- Tom Najem and Roy C. Amore, Historical Dictionary of Lebanon, Second Edition, Historical Dictionaries of Asia, Oceania, and the Middle East, Rowman & Littlefield Publishers, Lanham, Boulder, New York & London 2021. ISBN 9781538120439, 1538120437
- Tony Badran (Barry Rubin ed.), Lebanon: Liberation, Conflict, and Crisis, Palgrave Macmillan, London 2010. ISBN 978-0-230-62306-4
- Zachary Sex & Bassel Abi-Chahine, Modern Conflicts 2 – The Lebanese Civil War, From 1975 to 1991 and Beyond, Modern Conflicts Profile Guide Volume II, AK Interactive, 2021. EAN 8435568306073
- Zahera Harb, Channels of Resistance in Lebanon, Liberation, Propaganda, Hezbollah and the Media, I.B. Tauris, London 2011. ISBN 978-1848851207
- "Saad Haddad and the South Lebanon Army - Who Was Saad Haddad and the South Lebanon Army (SLA)". Middleeast.about. 14 January 1984. Archived from the original on 18 November 2012. Retrieved 19 October 2012.
