= List of armed groups in the War in Iraq (2013–2017) =

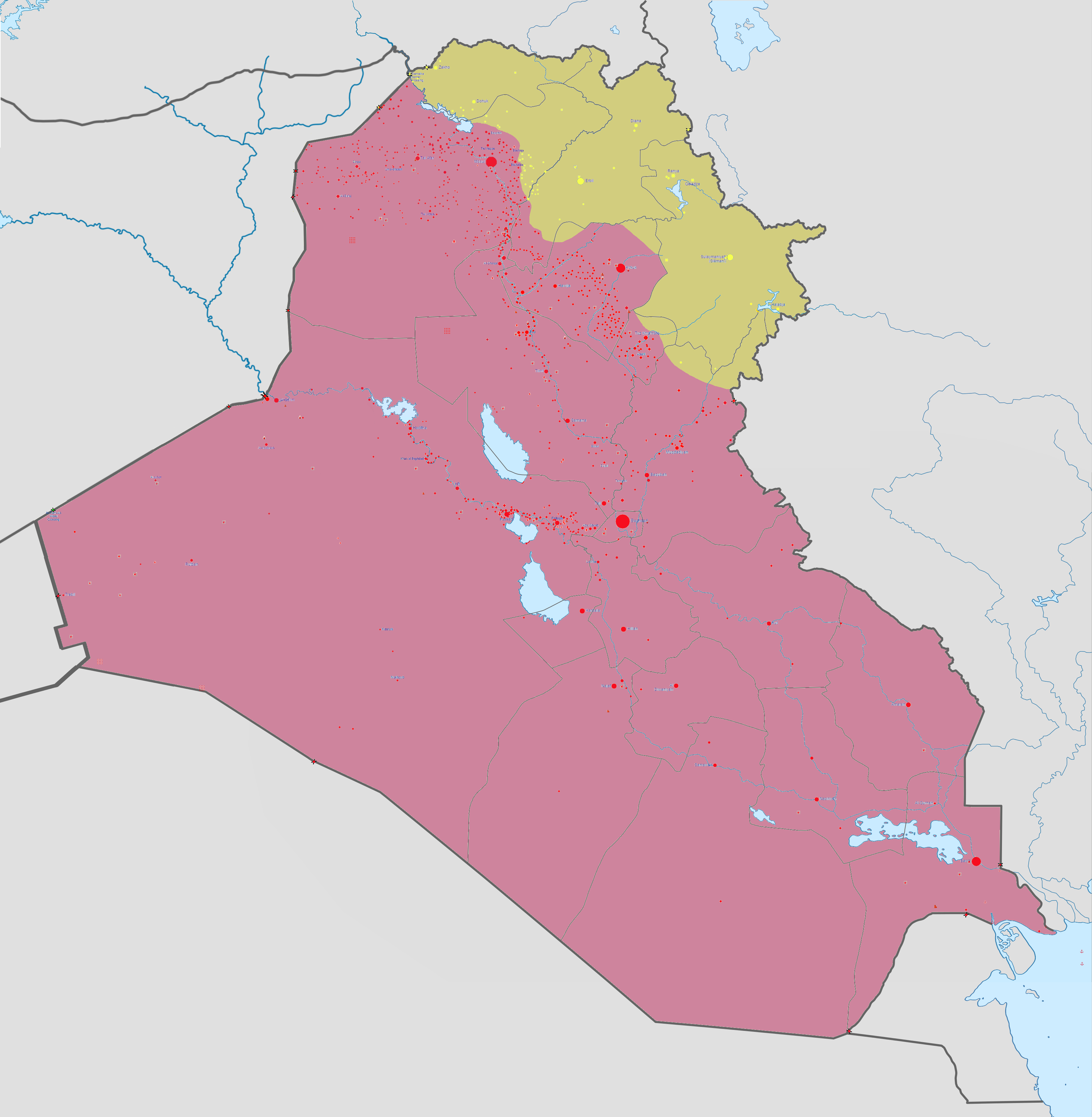
Territorial control of the Iraqi Government or allies (red) and the Kurdistan Regional Government (yellow) as of 2018

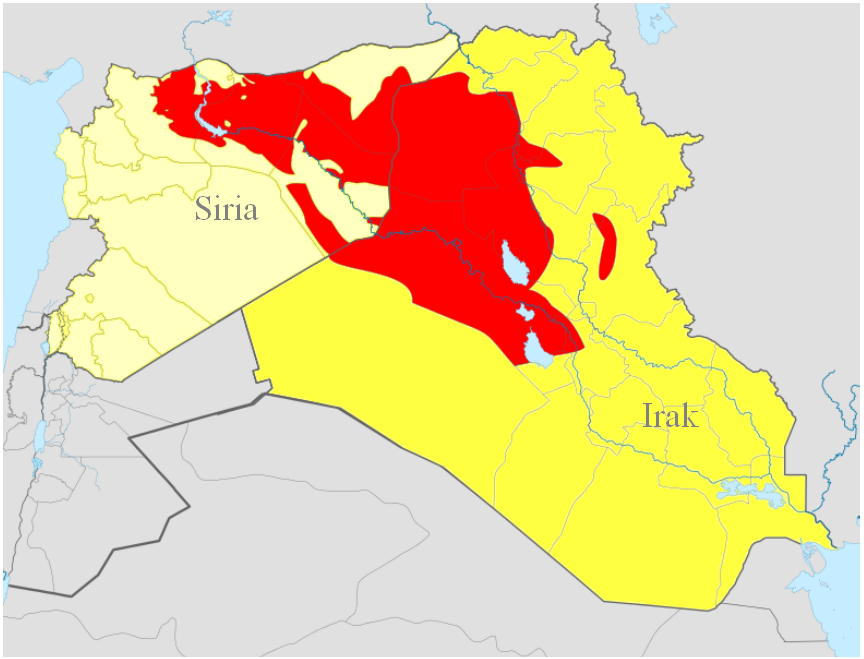
Territory of the Islamic State (red) in Iraq and Syria in mid-2014

This article is a list of armed groups involved in the War in Iraq (2013–2017). Part of the Iraqi conflict, the war escalated in 2013, following a 2011–2013 insurgency and the rise of the Islamic State. Following the liberation of much of Islamic State-held territory in 2017, only a low-level insurgency continued after. The Islamic State had a major involvement during the war, until it was militarily defeated in Iraq by Iraqi and western coalition forces in December 2017. Baathist supporters and some Sunni groups also fought against the Government of Iraq and its allies. The Peshmerga fought against the Islamic State and other forces during the war; though not against the government, and they did not join the Iraqi forces.

== War in Iraq (2013–2017) ==
Republic of Iraq and allies	(Kurdistan Region) Iraqi Kurdistan and allies	Iraqi Tribal, Sunni insurgent groups and allies	Islamic State and allies
(Iraq) Iraqi government forces: Iraqi Armed Forces; Iraqi Ground Forces; 1st Division; 2nd Division (2014); 8th Division; 9th Division; 15th Division; 16th Division; Iraqi Counter Terrorism Service; Iraqi Special Operations Forces; Iraqi Air Force; Iraqi Navy; Federal Police; Allied armed groups: Iraqi Turkmen Front; Mosul Battalions; Liwa Abu al-Fadhal al-Abbas; Free Mosul Movement; Martyrs of Salahuddin; Hezbollah; Iraqi Communist Party; Mukhtar Army; al-Jiburi tribe militias; Nineveh Guards (formally National Mobilization); Assyrian Forces: Nineveh Plain Protection Units; Qaraqosh Protection Committee; Babylon Brigades; Kataib Rouh Allah Issa Ibn Miriam; Popular Mobilization Forces: Badr Organization; Liwa al-Imam Muhammad al-Jawad; Liwa Karbala; Tashkil al-Karar; The Turkmen Brigade Northern Front; Quwat al-Shaheed al-Qa'id Abu Muntadhar al-Muhammadawi; Tashkil Malik al-Ashtar; Kata'ib Hezbollah; Saraya al-Dafa al-Shaabi; Abu al-Fadl al-Abbas Forces: Harakat Hezbollah al-Nujaba; Quwwat Sahl Ninawa; Kata'ib Sayyid al-Shuhada; Peace Companies; Asa'ib Ahl al-Haq; Quwat Liwa al-Shaheed al-Qa'id Abu Mousa al-Amiri; Turkmen Brigades; 16th Brigade; Bashir Regiment; Sayyid al-Shuhada; 52nd Brigade; Taza Regiment; 92nd Brigade; Talafar Regiment; Brigade of Imam Hussein; Saraya al-Jihad; Kata'ib al-Imam Ali; Quwat al-Shaheed al-Sadr (ar); Kata'ib al-Fatah al-Mubin; Al-Qa'im Regiment; Abbas al-Qitaliyah Division; Imam Ali Fighting Division; Kata'ib Jund al-Imam; Liwa al-Muntadhar; Saraya Ashura; Liwa Ali al-Akbar; Liwa al-Tafuf; Saraya al-Khorasani; Liwa al-Taff; Quwat al-Shaheed al-Sadr al-Awal (ar); Saraya Ansar al-Aqeeda; Kata'ib Ansar al-Hujja; Kata'ib al-Tayyar al-Risali; Quwat Waad Allah; Liwa Ansar al-Marja'iyya; Liwa Hashd Shuhada Kirkuk; Fursan al-Jubur; Jaysh al-Mu'ammal; Liwa'a Zulfiqar; CJTF–OIR: United States; Canada; Australia; Italy; Spain; Netherlands; United Kingdom; British Armed Forces; Royal Air Force; Jordan; Belgium; Turkey; Denmark (until 2016); Morocco (until 2016); Iran (2014–17): Armed Forces of the Islamic Republic of Iran; Islamic Republic of Iran Army; Islamic Republic of Iran Ground Forces; Islamic Republic of Iran Air Force; Islamic Revolutionary Guard Corps; Quds Force; Liwa Zainebiyoun; Aerospace Force; Basij; Pakistan (2015–17): Pakistani Army; Special Services Group; Inter-Services Intelligence; Covert Action Division; Ba'athist Syria (2013–14): Syrian Armed Forces; Syrian Air Force; Syrian Army; Supported by: Russia; China; Belarus	Iraqi Kurdistan: Peshmerga; Regional Guard Brigades (RGB); KDP-Peshmerga; 80 Unit; 1st Support Forces Command; Zeravani; Gulan Special Forces; Counter Terrorism Department; Rojava Peshmerga; PUK-Peshmerga; 70 Unit; 2nd Support Forces Command; CTG Special Forces; Kurdistan Commando Forces; Golden Force; Defense and Emergency Forces (DEF); Êzîdxan Protection Force; Kaka'i Battalion; Jazeera Brigade; Shabak Battalion; KDPS Peshmerga; (Kurdistan Region) Asayîş; CJTF–OIR: United States; Canada; Australia; France; Italy; Netherlands; United Kingdom; Jordan; Belgium; Turkey; Denmark (until 2016); Morocco (until 2016); Allied armed groups: Kurdistan Communities Union; Kurdistan Workers Party; People's Defence Forces; Free Women's Units; (Democratic Autonomous Administration of North and East Syria) Democratic Federation of Northern Syria; People's Protection Units; Syriac Military Council; Women's Protection Units; Kurdistan Free Life Party; Eastern Kurdistan Units; Women's Defence Forces; Sinjar Alliance; Sinjar Resistance Units; Êzîdxan Women's Units; Asayîşa Êzîdxanê; Special Forces of Êzîdxan; Kurdistan Freedom Party; Democratic Party of Iranian Kurdistan; Komala Party of Iranian Kurdistan; Marxist–Leninist Communist Party of Turkey; Ninewa Falcons Battalion; Assyrian/Christian Forces; Dwekh Nawsha; Nineveh Plain Forces (NPF); Nineveh Plain Guard Forces (NPGF); Tiger Guards; Battalion of the Assyrian Democratic Movement; Further support: Albania; Czech Republic; Estonia; Finland; Germany; Iran; Russia	Tribal Mobilization General Military Council for Iraqi Revolutionaries (2014): (Ba'athist Iraq) Naqshbandi Army (until 2015); Anbar Tribal Council (2013–2015); Islamic Army in Iraq (2013–2014); Free Iraqi Army (2013–2014); other sunni insurgents; Allied armed groups: Free Syrian Army; Supported by: Saudi Arabia (alleged); Hamas of Iraq(2013-2014); 1920 Revolution Brigades (2013-2015); Mujahideen Army (Iraq) (2013-2014); Jamaat Ansar al-Sunna (2013-2014); Jama'at Ansar al-Islam; Salafi Army of Abu Bakr Al-Siddiq; Turkey	Islamic State: Military of the Islamic State; White Flags (until 2017)

=== Notes ===
- Ba'athist loyalists and allied Sunni militias mostly attack the Iraqi Army, although there has been a history of fighting with IS dating back to the previous war.
- Fighting between Iraqi government and Kurdish forces broke out in October 2017. Prior to this, the two had worked together against IS, however fighting between Kurdish forces and Turkmen groups in the PMF had occurred sporadically since 2015.
- Coalition forces support both the Iraq government and Kurdish forces against IS, but are not involved in their conflict with one another and have urged for peaceful resolution.
- Turkey supported Kurdish forces against IS until 2017, but have since voiced support for Iraqi forces in their fight against the Kurds.
- The MCIR reportedly has a truce agreement with the Kurdish Regional Government not to target Kurdish territory, in return for the Regional Government's non-interference in the Council creating an autonomous area outside of the control of the current Iraqi government.

== See also ==
- Belligerents in the Syrian civil war
  - List of armed groups in the Syrian civil war spillover in Lebanon
- List of armed groups in the Second Libyan Civil War
- List of armed groups in the Yemeni civil war
- Combatants of the Iraq War
