= List of flags with Arabic-language text =

This is a list of flags that are inscribed with Arabic-language text.

== Shahada ==
The following flags contain text of a variant of the Shahada, which is usually rendered لا إله إلا الله محمد رسول الله ("There is no god but God; Muhammad is the messenger of God.")

Flag	Dates used	Location
Afghanistan	2004–21	at top of emblem
Afghanistan	1992	in centre stripe
Afghanistan	1992–96	within the emblem
Afghanistan	2001–02	within the emblem
Afghanistan (Taliban-led)	1997–2001	Centre of the flag
Afghanistan (Taliban-led)	2021–present	Centre of the flag
Afghanistan	2002–04	at top of emblem
Idrisid Emirate of Asir	1906–34	Centre of the flag
Bangladesh Islami Front	1990–present	
Bangsamoro Republik/Moro National Liberation Front	2013–present	in star and crescent
Hamas	–present	Centre of the flag
Kingdom of Hejaz and Nejd	1926–32	Appears above the sword, with this text from Surah As-Saff, the 61st chapter of the Qur'an, verse 13: "نَصرٌ مِنَ اللَّـهِ وَفَتحٌ قَريبٌ", "Victory from Allah and an eminent conquest"
Islamic State of Iraq/Islamic State of Iraq and the Levant	2006–present	On the top of the flag and the circle
Kuwait	1940–61	On the fly and the centre
Mutawakkilite Kingdom of Yemen	1918–27	
Emirate of Nejd and Hasa	1902–21	
Sultanate of Nejd	1921–26	
Saudi Arabia	1932–present	
Saudi Arabia (royal standard)	1932–present	
Somaliland	1996–present	In the green stripe
Tahrir al-Sham	2017–25	
Syrian Salvation Government	2018–24	

== Takbir ==
The following flags contain text of the Takbir, which is usually rendered الله أكبر (Allahu akbar, "God is greater")

Flag	Dates used	Location
Afghanistan	1992	in upper stripe
Bangladesh Islami Chhatrashibir	1977–present	
Iran	1980–present	written 22 times in the fringe of the green and red stripes
Iraq	1991–present	In the middle white stripe
Organisation of Islamic Cooperation	1969–2011	

== Other text ==
Flag	Dates used	Arabic text	English translation
Abu al-Fadl al-Abbas Forces	–present	1. قيادة قوات أبو الفضل العباس (ع); 2. إن تنصروا الله ينصركم; 3. المقر العام	1. Administration of Abu al-Fadl al-Abbas Forces (A); 2. If you glorify Allah, He will glorify you 3. Headquarters
Aerospace Force of the Islamic Revolutionary Guard Corps	–present	1. إِنَّ اللَّهَ يُحِبُّ الَّذينَ يُقاتِلونَ في سَبيلِهِ صَفًّا كَأَنَّهُم بُنيانٌ مَرصوص; 2. وَأَعِدّوا لَهُم مَا استَطَعتُم مِن قُوَّةٍ"	1. Indeed, Allah loves those who fight in His cause in a row as though they are a [single] structure joined firmly 2. And prepare against them whatever you are able of power
Amal Movement	–present	امل	Hope
Amman	1945–present	عمّان	Amman
Asa'ib Ahl al-Haq	–present	1. إنهم فتية آمنوا بربهم; 2. عصائب أهل الحق	1. They were youths who believed in their Lord; 2. League of Righteous People
Arab League	1945–present	جامعة الدول العربية	League of Arab States
Badr Organization	–present	ولقد نصركم الله ببدر	Allah had helped you at Badr
Ceremonial parade flag of Bangladesh	1972–present	إِنَّ ٱللَّهَ عَلَىٰ كُلِّ شَىْءٍۢ قَدِيرٌۭ	Indeed, Allah is over all things competent
Basij	–present	وأعدوا لهم ما استطعتم من قوة	And prepare against them whatever you are able of power
Beheira Governorate	–present	البحيرة	Beheira
Beirut	–present	بيروت أم الشرائع	Beirut mother of laws
Brunei	1959–present	الدائمون المحسنون بالهدى	Always Render Service with God's Guidance
Brunei (Sultan)	1999–present	الدائمون المحسنون بالهدى	Always Render Service with God's Guidance
Cairo Governorate	–present	القاهرة	Cairo
Comoros	1996–2001	1. اللّه; 2. محمّد	1. Allah; 2. Muhammad
Egypt	1984–present	جمهورية مصر العربية	Arab Republic of Egypt
Egypt (President)	1984–present	جمهورية مصر العربية [twice]	Arab Republic of Egypt [twice]
Eritrea (President)	1993–present	دولة إرتريا،	State of Eritrea
Faiyum Governorate	–present	جمهورية مصر العربية	Arab Republic of Egypt
Fujairah	1952–62	الفجيرة	Fujairah
Federation of Arab Republics	1972–84	اتحاد الجمهوريات العربية	Federation of Arab Republics
Haifa	–present	حيفا	Haifa
Link to image Hezbollah	–present	1. فإن حزب الله هم الغالبون (above logo); 2. المقاومة الإسلامية في لبنان (below logo); 3. حزب الله (logo itself in stylized representation)	1. Then surely the party of Allah are they that shall be triumphant 2. The Islamic Resistance in Lebanon; 3. Party of God
Imam Ali Officers' Academy	–present	فالجنود بإذن الله حصون الرعية	
Islamic Dawa Party	–present	حزب الدعوة الإسلامية	Islamic Dawa Party
Islamic Revolutionary Guard Corps	–present	1. إِنَّ اللَّهَ يُحِبُّ الَّذينَ يُقاتِلونَ في سَبيلِهِ صَفًّا كَأَنَّهُم بُنيانٌ مَرصوص; 2. وَأَعِدّوا لَهُم مَا استَطَعتُم مِن قُوَّةٍ"	1. Indeed, Allah loves those who fight in His cause in a row as though they are a [single] structure joined firmly 2. And prepare against them whatever you are able of power
Iranian Police	–present	1. مُحَمَّدٌ رَسُولُ اللَّهِ وَالَّذِينَ مَعَهُ أَشِدَّاءُ عَلَى الْكُفَّارِ رُحَمَاءُ بَيْنَهُمْ; 2. الْآمِرُونَ بِالْمَعْرُوفِ وَالنَّاهُونَ عَنِ الْمُنكَرِ وَالْحَافِظُونَ لِحُدُودِ اللَّهِ ۗ وَبَشِّرِ الْمُؤْمِنِينَ; 3. كُونُواْ قَوَّامِينَ لِلّهِ شُهَدَاء بِالْقِسْط	1. that enjoin good and forbid evil; and observe the limit set by Allah; 2. Muhammad is the messenger of Allah; and those who are with him are strong against Unbelievers, (but) compassionate amongst each other 3. Be Persistently Standing Firm for Allah, Witnesses in Justice
Iraqi Air Force	–present	القوة الجوية العراقية	Iraqi Air Force
Iraqi Army	–present	قيادة القوات البرية	Land forces leadership
Iraqi Navy	–present	قيادة القوة العراقية	Iraqi force leadership
Iraqi Special Operations Forces	–present	العمليات الخاص (twice)	Special operations (twice)
Islamic Republic of Iran Army	–present	1. إِنَّ اللَّهَ يُحِبُّ الَّذينَ يُقاتِلونَ في سَبيلِهِ صَفًّا كَأَنَّهُم بُنيانٌ مَرصوص; 2. وَأَعِدّوا لَهُم مَا استَطَعتُم مِن قُوَّةٍ; 3. وَإِنَّ جُنْدنَا لَهُمْ الْغَالِبُونَ	1. Indeed, Allah loves those who fight in His cause in a row as though they are a [single] structure joined firmly 2. And prepare against them whatever you are able of power 3. And Our Soldiers, They Verily Would Be the Victors
Kata'ib Hezbollah	–present	1. فقاتلوا أئمة الكفر إنهم لا إيمان لهم; 2. كتائب حزب الله	1. Fight ye the chiefs of Unfaith: for their oaths are nothing to them 2. Brigades of the Party of God
Kata'ib Sayyid al-Shuhada	–present	1. نصر من الله وفتح قريب; 2. كتائب سيد الشهداء (ع); 3. المقاومة الإسلامية في العراق	1. Support from God, and imminent victory 2. Sayyid of Martyrs Battalions (A); 3. The Islamic Resistance in Iraq
Khoddam Al-Mahdi Organisation	–present	1. خدام المهدي; 2. عليه الصلاة السلام	1. Servants of Al-Mahdi; 2. prayer and peace upon him
Kuwait	1914–21	كويت	Kuwait
Liwa Ali al-Akbar	2014–present	1. يا حسين; 2. لواء علي الأكبر عليه السلام; 3. الأمانة العامة للعتبة الحسينية المقدسة	1. Ya Husayn (left); 2. Ali al-Akbar Brigade peace be upon him 3. General Secretariat of the Imam Husayn Shrine
Luxor Governorate	–present	محافظة الأقصر	Luxor Governorate
Matrouh Governorate	–present	محافظة مطروح	Matrouh Governorate
Morocco (royal standard)	–present	إن تنصروا الله ينصركم	If you glorify Allah, He will glorify you
Muhammad Rasul Allah Corps	–present	1. إِنَّ اللَّهَ يُحِبُّ الَّذينَ يُقاتِلونَ في سَبيلِهِ صَفًّا كَأَنَّهُم بُنيانٌ مَرصوص; 2. وَأَعِدّوا لَهُم مَا استَطَعتُم مِن قُوَّةٍ"; 3. محمد رسول الله	1. Indeed, Allah loves those who fight in His cause in a row as though they are a [single] structure joined firmly 2. And prepare against them whatever you are able of power 3. Muhammad is the messenger of God
State of Palestine	–present	فلسطين	Palestine
Popular Mobilization Forces	–present	1. جمهورية العراق (above logo); 2. الله اكبر; 3. الحشد الشعبي	1. Republic of Iraq; 2. God is Great; 3. Popular Mobilization
Promised Day Brigades	–2014	لبيك يا محمد	Labayek Oh Muhammad
Port Said Governorate	–present	جمهورية مصر العربية	Arab Republic of Egypt
Qatar	1936–49	قطر	Qatar
Quds Force	–present	وأعدوا لهم ما استطعتم من قوة	And prepare against them whatever you are able of power
Republic of Yemen Armed Forces	–present	القوات المسلحة اليمنية	Yemeni Armed Forces
South Sinai Governorate	–present	محافظة جنوب سيناء	South Sinai Governorate
Syrian Air Force	–2024	القوى الجوية	Air Forces
Syrian Armed Forces	1980–2024	1. وطن شرف إخلاص; 2. الجيش العربي السوري	1. Homeland Honor Devotion; 2. Syrian Arab Army
Syrian Army	–2024	القوى البرية	Land warfare
Syrian Navy	–present	القوى البحرية	Navy Forces
Syrian Democratic Forces	–present	قوات سوريا الديمقراطية	Syrian Democratic Forces
Syrian Resistance	–present	المقاومة السورية	Syrian Resistance
South Yemen (President)	1970–90	جمهورية اليمن الديمقراطية الشعبية	People's Democratic Republic of Yemen
Sudan (President)	1985–present	1. النصر لنا; 2. جمهورية السودان	1. Victory is ours 2. Republic of the Sudan
Sudan (President)	1970–85	1. النصر لنا; 2. جمهورية السودان الديمُقراطية	1. Victory is ours 2. Democratic Republic of the Sudan
Link to image Tunis	–present	مدينة تونس	City of Tunis
United Arab Emirates (President)	1973–present	الإمارات العربية المتحدة	United Arab Emirates
Yemen (President)	1990–present	الجمهورية اليمنية	The Yemeni Republic
Yemeni Air Force	–present	1. ولله جنود السموات والأرض; 2. القوات الجوية والدفاع الجوي	1. To God belong the forces of the heavens and the earth 2. Air Forces and Air Defense
Yemeni Navy	–present	القوات البحرية اليمنية والدفاع الساحلي	Yemeni Navy Forces and Coastal Defense

== See also ==
- List of inscribed flags
