= Al-Fatah SC (Iraq) =

Iraqi football club

- Full name: Al-Fatah Sport Club
- Founded: 2018; 7 years ago
- Ground: Al-Walaa Stadium
- Owner: Fatah Alliance
- Chairman: Ahmed Al-Asadi
- Manager: Riyadh Kamil
- League: Iraqi Third Division League
| Home colours | Away colours |

Al-Fatah Sport Club (Arabic: نادي الفتح الرياضي), is an Iraqi football team based in Al-Rusafa, Baghdad.

== Managerial history ==
- (Iraq) Thabit Gatie
- (Iraq) Sabah Jomah
- (Iraq) Mahmoud Shaker
- (Iraq) Riyadh Kamil

== See also ==
- 2021–22 Iraqi Third Division League
