= Islamic Dawa Party =

Islamic political party in Iraq (founded 1958)

Islamic Dawa Party حزب الدعوة الإسلامية
- General Secretary: Nouri al-Maliki
- Supreme Leader: Mojtaba Khamenei
- Founders: Mohammed Sadiq Al-Qamousee; Muhammad Baqir al-Sadr; Sayed Talib Al-Refaii
- Allegiance: Iran (IRGC)
- Founded: July 1957; 69 years ago
- Headquarters: Baghdad, Iraq
- Military wing: Jihadi Wing (1979–2003); Quwat al-Shaheed al-Sadr (ar); National Defence Brigades (ar)
- Ideology: Islamic economics Populism; Shia Islamism
- Religion: Shia Islam
- National affiliation: State of Law Coalition
- International affiliation: Axis of Resistance
- Colours: Green, red
- Council of Representatives: 0 / 329

Party flag

Website
- www.islamicdawaparty.org

Armed Wing
- Leader: Nouri al-Maliki
- Dates active: 1979–2003
- Allegiance: Iran (IRGC)
- Headquarters: Sadr Camp in Ahvaz, Iran
- Active regions: Iraq; Lebanon; Kuwait

The Islamic Dawa Party (Arabic: حزب الدعوة الإسلامية, romanized: Ḥizb ad-Daʿwa al-Islāmiyya) is an Iraqi Shia Islamist political movement that was formed in 1957 by seminarians in Najaf, Iraq, and later formed branches in Lebanon and Kuwait. The party backed the Iranian Revolution and also Ayatollah Ruhollah Khomeini during the Iran–Iraq War. It supported the invasion of Iraq. Iran played a crucial role in the development of the movement, especially its Lebanese branch which later became Hezbollah. The Islamic Dawa Party is led by Nouri al-Maliki.

== History ==
The Dawa Party coalesced in the years around 1960 in Shia holy cities in southern Iraq. At the time, its primary goal was to counterbalance the intellectual hold that Marxism and other secular ideologies had on Iraqi Shia. Seminarian Muhammad Baqir al-Sadr quickly emerged as its leading figure and wrote its manifesto, al-Usus, probably in 1960. The group argued for the creation of an Islamic polity and a modern political movement, with a disciplined, cell-based structure inspired by Leninist organizational ideas, to propagate its beliefs. It defined its mission as to "establish an Islamic government and install a ruling apparatus until favorable conditions arise to enable the nation to give its opinion in a referendum." Party leaders and scholars have given different dates for the foundation of the movement, with estimates ranging from 1957 through the late 1960s. They also differ on when it adopted its name, when it started to be considered a party, and in which city—Najaf or Karbala—it was founded.

A twin party was also founded in Lebanon by clerics who had studied in Najaf and supported Muhammad Baqr al-Sadr's vision of a resurgent Islam.

Hizb Al-Dawa gained strength in the 1970s recruiting from among the Shi'a ulama and youth. During the 1970s, the government shut down the Shi'a journal Risalat al-Islam and closed several religious educational institutions. The government passed a law obligating Iraqi students of the hawza to undertake national military service. The Ba'athists then began specifically targeting Al-Dawa members, arresting and imprisoning them from 1972 onwards.

In 1973, someone killed the alleged head of Al-Dawa's Baghdad branch in prison.

In 1974, 75 members of the party, were arrested and sentenced to death by the Ba'athist revolutionary court. This included 5 of the party's most preeminent members, who were Shaykh Aref al-Basri, Sayyid Izz al-Din al-Qubanchi, Sayyid Imad al-Din al-Tabatabaei, and the two Fa'izids, Nuri Tumah, and Husayn Jelokhan. They were sentenced to death in December of that year.

In 1975, the government canceled the annual procession from Najaf to Karbala, known as marad al-ras. Although subject to repressive measures throughout the 1970s, large-scale opposition to the government by Al-Dawa goes back to the Safar Intifada of February 1977.

Despite the government's ban on the celebration of marad al-ras, Al-Dawa organized the procession in 1977. They were subsequently attacked by police. After this period it also interacted with the Ayatollah Ruhollah Khomeini, the future leader of Iran, during his exile in Najaf in Iraq.

Widely viewed in the West as a terrorist organization at the time, the Dawa party was banned in 1980 and its members sentenced to death in absentia by the Revolutionary Command Council.

=== Iranian Islamic Revolution and US Embassy Bombing ===
Dawa supported the Islamic Revolution in Iran and in turn received support from the Iranian government. During the Iran–Iraq War, Iran backed a Dawa insurgency against Saddam Hussein's Ba'athist government in Iraq. In 1979, Dawa moved its headquarters to Tehran, the capital of Iran. In April 1980, it failed an assassination attempt of Iraqi Deputy Prime Minister Tariq Aziz but killed 11 students. It then bombed the funeral procession held for the students three days later. It bombed the Iraqi Embassy in Beirut in December 1981, the first of its international attacks. Dawa party was thought to have been behind the bombing of the US embassy in Kuwait as well as other installations as punishment of Kuwait, America and France's military and financial assistance to Iraq in its war against Iran (see 1983 Kuwait bombings). One of those convicted for the bombing was Abu Mahdi al-Muhandis, a member of Iraq's parliament and military commander of the Popular Mobilization Forces.

Despite this cooperation, al-Sadr's and Khomeini's visions of an Islamic Republic differed sharply in certain respects. While Khomeini argued the power of the state should rest with the ulama, Al-Dawa supported the notion of power resting with the ummah, or in other words, the people. This disagreement was one factor that led to the formation of the Supreme Council for the Islamic Revolution in Iraq (SCIRI) as a separate group from Al-Dawa. Al-Dawa claimed to have many Sunni members in the 1980s and coordinated with several Sunni Islamist groups at that stage. On 31 March 1980, the Ba'athist regime's Revolutionary Command Council passed a law sentencing to death all past and present members of the Dawa party, its affiliated organizations, and people working for its goals. This was soon followed by a renewed and relentless purge of alleged and actual party members, with estimates varying on the numbers executed due to the secretive nature of the Iraqi regime.

In the West, Al-Dawa was widely viewed as a terrorist organization during the Iran–Iraq War, especially since the West tended to be more supportive of Iraq during that conflict. It is thought responsible for a host of assassination attempts in Iraq against the president, prime minister and others, as well as attacks against Western and Sunni targets elsewhere. In 1980 it attempted to assassinate Tariq Aziz, Hussein's longtime loyalist. In 1982 and 1987 it also attempted to assassinate Saddam Hussein. Following Saddam's 2003 overthrow, the former president was ultimately hanged for the Dujail massacre, the judicial reprisals and torture carried out following a Dawa assassination attempt on himself in 1982.

=== Dawa versus Muhammad Baqir al-Sadr in the '80s ===
Tensions between Al-Sadr and Dawa came to light when Al-Sadr forbade his students at the seminary (Hawza) from joining the Dawa party. Amongst the retaliatory steps taken, Dawa switched their allegiance to Abu Al-Qassim Al-Khoei another leading scholar in Najaf.

=== 1990s ===
After the Gulf War, the interests of Al-Dawa and the United States became more closely aligned. The efforts of Al-Dawa representatives and other opponents of Saddam Hussein led to the founding of the Iraqi National Congress, which relied heavily on United States funding. INC's political platform promised "human rights and rule of law within a constitutional, democratic, and pluralistic Iraq". The Dawa Party itself participated in the congress between 1992 and 1995, withdrawing because of disagreements with Kurdish parties over how Iraq should be governed after Hussein's eventual ouster.

=== 2003 American invasion ===
Most leaders of Al-Dawa remained in exile in Iran and elsewhere until the American invasion of Iraq in 2003. During this period, some of its factions moved to the SCIRI. Al-Dawa Party, took part in the 2002 Iraqi opposition's London conference in support of the invasion.

=== Recent development ===
The Iraqi Islamic Dawa Party re-elected Nouri al-Maliki, Prime Minister of Iraq between 2006 and 2014, as its secretary-general in July 2019.

According to Harith Hassan of the Carnegie Middle East Center, Islamic Dawa was Iraq's leading party from 2003 to 2018, but during this time "its commitment to building an Islamic state waned and its priorities were shaped increasingly by the challenges of governance and the pursuit of clientelist politics". It has felt compelled to focus on ethnosectarian (Shia) identity, political patronage, and the division of petroleum export spoils to win support, instead of selling its ideology and political programs to voters. In 2019, according to some analysts it had become "divided by internal factions".

In 2026, Dawa Party leader al-Maliki was nominated for the Iraqi premiership.

Following the assassination of Ali Khamenei during the 2026 Iran war, Dawa Party leader Nouri al-Maliki pledged allegiance to the new supreme leader of Iran, Mojtaba Khamenei.

== Ideology ==
The political ideology of Al-Dawa is heavily influenced by work done by Baqr al-Sadr, who laid out four mandatory principles of governance in his 1975 work, Islamic Political System. These are:

1. Absolute sovereignty belongs to God.
2. Islamic injunctions are the basis of legislation. The parliamentary authority may enact any law not repugnant to Islam.
3. The people, as vice-regents of Allah, are entrusted with parliamentary and executive powers.
4. The jurist holding religious authority represents Islam. By confirming parliamentary and executive actions, he gives them legality.

In his Islamic political system, Sadr sought "a balance" between the two forces of "consultation" (shura, the role of "the people") and the oversight role of the ‘ulama, specifically "the jurist holding religious authority represents Islam". He thought that political control should be

“. . .exercised through the election by the people of the head of the executive power, after confirmation by the marja’iyya, [i.e. the most highly regarded scholarly sources of emulation or maraji3] and through the election of a parliament, which is in charge of confirming the members of government appointed by the Executive, and passing appropriate legislation to fill up the discretionary area.”

Upon joining the party, allegiance must be sworn to the party.

== Timeline ==
- 1968–1969: Al-Dawa founded by Muhammad Baqir al-Sadr in response to repression of Shi'i religious academies in Najaf by the Iraqi Ba'ath regime.
- 1974: Ba'athist revolutionary court arrests and sentences 75 Al-Dawa members to death.
- 1975: Annual pilgrimage from Najaf to Karbala – called the Marad al-Ras – is cancelled by the Ba'ath government.
- 1977 February: The Safar Intifada. Al-Dawa organizes Marad al-Ras, in spite of government ban. Event is attacked by police.
- 1979: Iranian Revolution. Al-Dawa creates a military wing, later called Shahid al-Sadr.
- 1980 30 March: Ba'athist Revolutionary Command Council retroactively bans Al-Dawa; membership was made punishable by death. 96 Al-Dawa members are allegedly executed this month.
- 1980 1 April: Al-Dawa unsuccessfully attempts to assassinate Tariq Aziz, Foreign Minister at the time.
- 1980 9 April: Ayatollah Muhammad Baqir al-Sadr and his sister Amina al-Sadr are arrested and executed.
- 1981 Mid-December: Iraqi embassy in Beirut is leveled by a suicide bomber. Iraqi Al-Dawa party claims credit for the attack, citing Iraq's invasion of Iran. Perhaps the first Shia suicide bombing, the attack was an "oft-noticed precedent" for the 1983 bombing of the American Embassy and Marine barracks in Beirut.
- 1982: Al-Dawa assassination attempt on Saddam Hussein in Dujail fails. Heavy crack-downs on Al-Dawa by Hussein's regime follow, leading to the Dujail massacre. Many flee to Iran, where it suffers from competition with the SCIRI.
- 1983 12 December: In Kuwait, the American and French embassies, Kuwait airport, the main oil refinery in Kuwait, and a residential area for Raytheon employees are bombed. 17 suspects were soon arrested, mostly Al-Dawa members, including Jamal Jafaar Mohammed (currently a member of Iraq's parliament as a member of Prime Minister Nuri al-Maliki's ruling coalition). Jamal Jafaar Mohammed escapes from Kuwait before the trial starts and is sentenced to death in absentia in 1984.
- 1987: Al-Dawa attacks Saddam's motorcade but again fails to kill him.
- 1996: Attempt made on the life of Saddam's son, Uday. Al-Dawa blamed.
- 2003: After the Invasion of Iraq Al-Dawa returns to Iraq, basing itself in the city of Nasiriyah which the party now runs and controls.
- 2005 January: The United Iraqi Alliance, triumphs in the January 2005 Elections; Dawa leader Ibrahim al-Jaafari becomes Prime Minister.
- 2005 December: The United Iraqi Alliance, triumphs in the December 2005 Elections.
- 2006: Dawa deputy leader Nouri al-Maliki replaces Ibrahim al-Jaafari as Prime Minister.
- 2010: Al-Maliki nominated for Prime Minister for the second term.
- 2026: Al-Maliki nominated for Prime Minister for the third term.

== Prominent members ==
This list includes current as well as former party members

=== Iraq ===
- Muhammad Baqir al-Sadr (party founder)
- Ezzedine Salim (political theorist, former party leader)
- Hashim Al-Mosawy (former party secretary-general)
- Ibrahim al-Jaafari (63rd Prime Minister of Iraq, former party member)
- Nouri al-Maliki (64th Prime Minister of Iraq, current party leader)
- Haider al-Abadi (65th Prime Minister of Iraq, former party member)
- Mohammed Shia' al-Sudani (68th Prime Minister of Iraq, former party member)
- Abu Mahdi al-Muhandis (former deputy chairman of PMF, former secretary-general of Kata'ib Hezbollah, former party member)
- Falih Al-Fayyadh (former member of the National Security Council, current chairman of PMF, former party member)
- Khodayyir Abbas (surgeon, former interim Minister of Health, party member)
- Kasim Muhammad Taqi al-Sahlani (former senior party member)
- Ammar al-Saffar (former Deputy Minister of Health, kidnapped in 2006)
- Abdel Falah al-Sudani (former Minister of Education and Minister of Agriculture, party member)
- Sami al-Askari (senior adviser, party member)
- Dhiya Al-Shakarchi (thinker, former party member)

=== Lebanon ===
- Mohammad Hussein Fadlallah (co-founder and former party leader)
- Mohammad Mehdi al-Hakim (co-founder)
- Mohammad Mehdi Shamseddine (co-founder)
- Subhi al-Tufayli (former party secretary-general)
- Abbas al-Musawi (former party secretary-general, co-founder of Hezbollah)
- Mohammad Yazbek (co-founder of Hezbollah)
- Hassan Nasrallah (former secretary-general of Hezbollah)
- Naim Qassem (current secretary-general of Hezbollah)
- Mohammad Raad (politician)
- Ragheb Harb (politician)

== See also ==
- List of Islamic political parties
