= Popular Mobilization Forces =

Iraqi paramilitary umbrella group

- قوات الحشد الشعبي
- Emblem
- Founder: Ali Sistani
- Supreme Leader: Mojtaba Khamenei (Note: De facto authority; almost all PMF factions take orders from and pledge allegiance to the Supreme Leader of Iran.)
- Chairman: Falih Al-Fayyadh
- Chief of Staff: Abu Fadak al-Mohammadawi
- Notable commanders: Abu Mahdi al-Muhandis X
- Dates active: 15 June 2014 – present
- Country: Iraq
- Allegiance: Iraq (de jure); Iran (de facto, IRGC)
- Groups: See groups and other formations
- Headquarters: Baghdad, Iraq
- Ideology: Shia Islamism; Khomeinism; Velayat-e Faqih; Iranian interests Anti-Sunnism (alleged); Anti-West; Anti-LGBT
- Political position: Right-wing
- Size: 60,000 (2014); 230,000 (self-claimed in 2022)
- Part of: Iraqi Armed Forces (de jure, in effect largely under the control of Iran and the Axis of Resistance)
- Website: al-hashed.gov.iq

The Popular Mobilization Forces (PMF; Arabic: قوات الحشد الشعبي, romanized: Quwwāt al-Ḥashd ash-Shaʿbī), also known as the Popular Mobilization Units (PMU), is a paramilitary umbrella group that operates within Iraq. Although formally and legally part of the Iraqi Armed Forces and reporting directly to the prime minister, PMF leaders act independently from state control and, in practice, answer to the supreme leader of Iran.

The PMF is composed of about 67 primarily Shia armed factions, almost all of which are Iranian-backed and openly pledge allegiance to the supreme leader of Iran. In 2024, the PMF's chief of staff, Abu Fadak al-Mohammadawi, openly declared that the PMF took orders from Mojtaba Hosseini Khamenei's father and predecessor Ali Khamenei. PMF chairman Falih al-Fayyadh cooperates with the Iranian IRGC to implement Iranian instructions in Iraq and reinforce Iranian influence over the militias.

The PMF was formed in 2014 and fought in nearly every major battle during the War in Iraq against the Islamic State. In December 2016, the Council of Representatives passed a law defining the PMF's legal status under the Popular Mobilization Commission (PMC; Arabic: هيئة الحشد الشعبي), including all PMF groups.

Many of its main forces that belong to the Shia faction trace their origins to the "Special Groups", Iranian-sponsored Shia groups that previously fought in the Iraqi insurgency against the United States and the Coalition forces, as well as a simultaneous sectarian conflict against Sunni Jihadist and Ba'athist insurgents. Pro-Iran organizations in the PMF include the Badr Organization, Asa'ib Ahl al-Haq, Kata'ib Hezbollah, Kata'ib al-Imam Ali, Saraya Khorasani, etc. Several militant groups received training and strategic aid from Hezbollah's Unit 3800. It has been labeled the new Iraqi Republican Guard after it was fully reorganized in early 2018 by its then commander-in-chief Haider al-Abadi, previous prime minister of Iraq, who issued "regulations to adapt the situation of the Popular Mobilization fighters". Politically, the PMF was represented by the Fatah Alliance.

Factions within the PMF are designated as terrorist groups by some states, including the United States, the United Arab Emirates, and Japan, and have been widely accused of promoting sectarian violence, perpetrating ethnic cleansing and displacement of Iraqi Sunnis, and carrying out war crimes, including abductions, forced disappearances, massacres, extrajudicial killings, and the destructions of villages in Anbar, Saladin, and Diyala, as well as conducting anti-Sunni campaigns described as inherently genocidal. During the 2019–2021 Iraqi protests, the pro-Iran groups were accused of being responsible for killing and wounding large numbers of protesters and activists. Pro-Iran PMF groups have also fought against pro-Sistani and Sadrist PMF groups, and their increasing rivalry erupted into violent clashes in 2022. Since 2020, Iranian-backed PMF groups have launched attacks against American forces and its allies in the region, claiming them under the name of the Islamic Resistance in Iraq.

== Logos and flags ==
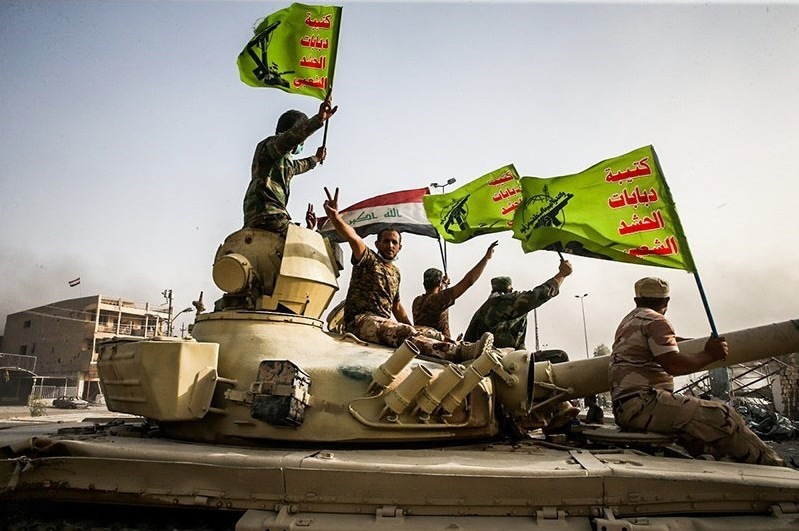
PMF troops enter Fallujah after the Third Battle of Fallujah with flags of Iraq and the local militia

While the factions have their own flags, a yellow or white flag with the phrase "Al-Hashd Al-Sha'bi" is also used by PMF alongside the Iraqi flag. PMF factions also frequently hold up Iranian flags and posters of Iranian religious figures such as Ruhollah Khomeini.

== Name ==
With regard to the official native name, the Arabic word الشعبي (ash-Shaʿbī) translates as "people's" or "popular", as referred to the people; the Arabic word الحشد (al-Ḥashd) translates as "mobilization" or "Mass", as in the group of people mobilized rather than the process of mobilization. In other contexts, al-hashd may translate as other terms such as "crowd", "horde", "throng", or "gathering".

== Background and formation ==
The PMF trace their origins to the so-called Special Groups, a US term to designate Shiite groups of the Iraqi insurgency, supported and funded by the Iranian Quds Force, as opposed to Ba'athist loyalist or radical Sunni Salafi jihadist insurgents.

The Special Groups fought both the US-led coalition forces alongside the Ba'athist and Sunni insurgents in a sectarian conflict. Originally, there were seven forces in the PMF, which had been operating with former prime minister of Iraq Nouri al-Maliki's support since early 2014.

=== Original seven groups ===
- Badr Brigades (military wing of the Badr Organization)
- Asa'ib Ahl al-Haq (military wing of Asa'ib Ahl al-Haqn, IRI-affiliated)
- Kata'ib Hezbollah (IRI-affiliated)
- Kata'ib Sayyid al-Shuhada (IRI-affiliated)
- Harakat Hezbollah al-Nujaba (IRI-affiliated)
- Kata'ib Jund al-Imam
- Kata'ib al-Imam Ali

=== Additional groups ===
- Imam Ali Combat Division (military wing of Imam Ali Shrine in Najaf)
- Liwa al-Muntadhar
- Saraya Ashura
- Liwa Karbala'
- Liwa Ali al-Akbar
- Liwa al-Tafuf
- Quwat al-Shaheed al-Sadr (military wing of the Islamic Dawa Party)
- Turkmen Brigades
- Saraya al-Jihad
- Saraya al-Khorasani
- Harakat Ansar Allah al-Awfiya (IRI-affiliated)
- Tashkil al-Hussein al-Tha'ir
- Liwa al-Taff
- Al-Abbas Combat Division
- Quwat al-Shaheed al-Qa'id Abu Muntadhar al-Muhammadawi
- Saraya Ansar al-Aqeeda
- Kata'ib Ansar al-Hujja
- Shabak Brigade
- Kata'ib al-Tayyar al-Risali (military wing of The Upholders of the Message)
- Quwat Wa'ad Allah (military wing of the Islamic Virtue Party)
- Lalish Regiment
- Liwa al-Hussein
- Harakat al-Abdal
- Liwa Ansar al-Marja'iyya
- Babylon Brigades (military wing of the Babylon Movement)
- Salah al-Din Brigade
- Liwa Hashd Shuhada' Kirkuk (military wing of the Union of National Forces Party)
- Fursan al-Jubur
- Jaysh al-Mu'ammal
- Ninawa Guards
- Saraya al-Salam (military wing of the Sadrist Movement, 2014-2021)
- Sinjar Resistance Units
- Kataib Sarkhat al-Quds (IRI-affiliated)
- Al-Thawriyyun group (IRI-affiliated)
- Tribal Mobilization
- Ya Ali Popular Formations (alleged)

According to Faleh A. Jabar and Renad Mansour for the Carnegie Middle East Center, Prime Minister Nouri al-Maliki used these forces to combat the emergence of ISIL and maintain his influence in predominantly Sunni areas.

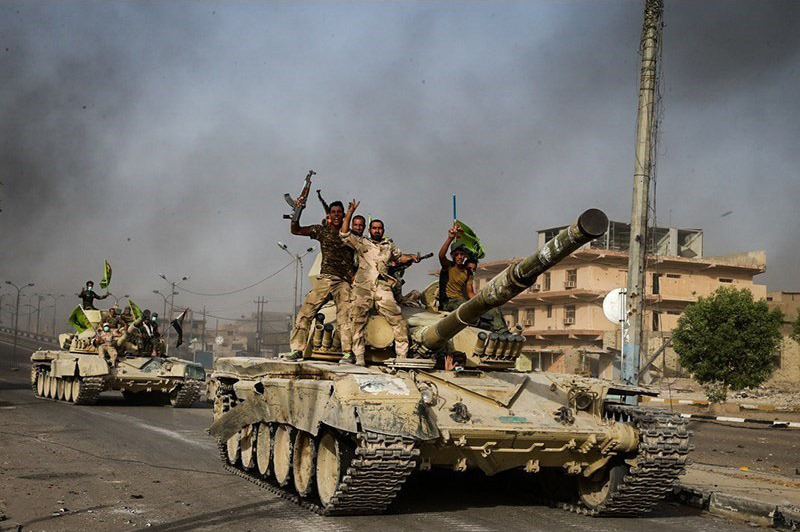
PMF troops enter re-captured Fallujah in June 2016

The People's Mobilization Forces (PMF) were formed by the Iraqi government on 15 June 2014 after top Iraqi Shia cleric Ali al-Sistani's non-sectarian fatwa on "Sufficiency Jihad" on 13 June. The fatwa called for defending Iraqi cities, particularly Baghdad, and to participate in the counter-offensive against ISIL, following the Fall of Mosul on 10 June 2014. The forces brought together a number of Shia militias, most of which receive direct support from Iran, along with a small number of Sunni tribesmen by uniting existing militias under the "People's Mobilization Committee" of the Iraqi Ministry of Interior in June 2014. The forces would fall under the umbrella of the state's security services and within the legal frameworks and practices of the Ministry of Interior. On 19 December 2016, Iraqi president Fuad Masum approved a law passed by parliament in November that incorporated PMU in the country's armed forces. The pro-Assad website Al-Masdar News reports that, with this incorporation, the PMU are now subject to the supreme commander of the national armed forces and will no longer be affiliated to any political or social group. However, many of these irregulars have continued to operate independently of the Iraqi state.

On 21 March 2017, the PMU announced the launch of a special forces course, in order to create a Special Forces Division. The training program covered a variety of missions with direction from the Iraqi Special Operations Forces. On December 11, 2017, the PMU began to be entirely consolidated under the Iraqi Armed Forces, following a call by Ayatollah Ali al-Sistani to integrate. However, as late as May 2018, this integration had yet to take place, and PMF members remained without the same wages and privileges as soldiers in the regular Iraqi Armed Forces.

According to some sources, the Popular Mobilization Forces have made significant advances on the battlefield, as they have undermined the superiority of ISIL at the level of guerrilla warfare, as well as at the level of the psychological operations.

== Structure ==
In 2025, the Popular Mobilization Forces are led by a chairman appointed by the prime minister, and a chief of staff. The PMF operates in a decentralized manner.

=== Chairman of the Popular Mobilization Forces ===
The chairman of the PMF is assisted by a dedicated office. There are also nine central directorates subordinate to the chairman, being:

- Administrative Affairs;
- Doctrinal Guidance;
- Financial Affairs;
- Legal Affairs;
- Media;
- Planning;
- Public Relations;
- Security;
- Inspector-general of the Popular Mobilization Forces.

=== Chief of staff of the Popular Mobilization Forces ===
The chief of staff of the Popular Mobilization Forces exercises command over five deputy chiefs of staff, being the:

- Deputy chief of staff for medical affairs, combatants, and sacrifices;
- Deputy chief of staff for logistics support;
- Deputy chief of staff for administrative and personnel affairs;
- Deputy chief of staff for intelligence and information affairs;
- Deputy chief of staff for operations affairs.

=== Operations commands ===
The Popular Mobilization Forces are subdivided into eleven regional-based Operations Commands, being the:

- Anbar Operations Command
- Baghdad Operations Command
- Basra Operations Command
- Diyala Operations Command
- Kirkuk and East Tigris Operations Command
- Jazeera and Badia Operations Command
- Middle Euphrates Operations Command
- Ninewa Operations Command
- Rafidain Operations Command
- Salah ad Din Operations Command
- Samarra Operations Command

=== Active units ===
Unit	Commander	Parent militias, parties, and tribes
1st Brigade		Badr Organization and Liwa al-Imam Muhammad al-Jawad
2nd Brigade		Imam Ali Combat Division
3rd Brigade	Tashkil Asad Amerli	Badr Organization
4th Brigade		Badr Organization
5th Brigade (Tashkil al-Karar unit)	Abu Dergham al-Maturi (formerly)	Badr Organization
6th Brigade	Ahmad al-Asadi	Kata'ib Jund al-Imam (Islamic Movement in Iraq)
7th Brigade	Dagher al-Mousawi	Liwa al-Muntadhar
8th Brigade	Abu Ahmed Khadhim al-Jabiri	Saraya Ashura
9th Brigade		Liwa Karbala' and Badr Organization
10th Brigade		Badr Organization
11th Brigade	Ali al-Hamdani	Liwa Ali al-Akbar
12th Brigade	Akram al-Ka'abi	Harakat Hezbollah al-Nujaba
13th Brigade	Qasim Muslih	Liwa al-Tafuf
14th Brigade	Abu Ala al-Walai	Kata'ib Sayyid al-Shuhada
15th Brigade		Quwat al-Shaheed al-Sadr (Islamic Dawa Party) and Kata'ib al-Fatah al-Mubin
16th Brigade		Turkmen Brigades and Badr Organization
17th Brigade	Hassan al-Sari	Saraya al-Jihad
18th Brigade	Ali al-Yasiri	Saraya al-Khorasani
19th Brigade	Abd al-Zahra al-Swei'adi	Harakat Ansar Allah al-Awfiya and Tashkil al-Hussein al-Tha'ir
20th Brigade	Hashim Ahmad al-Tamimi	Liwa al-Taff
21st Brigade		Badr Organization
22nd Brigade	Abu Kawthar al-Muhammadawi	Badr Organization
23rd Brigade		Badr Organization
24th Brigade		Badr Organization
25th Brigade		Quwat al-Shaheed al-Sadr (Islamic Dawa Party)
26th Brigade		al-Abbas Combat Division
27th Brigade		Badr Organization and Quwat al-Shaheed al-Qa'id Abu Muntadhar al-Muhammadawi
28th Brigade	Jalal al-Din Ali al-Saghir	Saraya Ansar al-'Aqeeda
29th Brigade	Ahmad al-Fariji	Kata'ib Ansar al-Hujja
30th Brigade	Sabah Salem al Shabaki	Shabak Militia and Badr Organization
31st Brigade	Adnan al-Shahmani	Kata'ib al-Tayyar al-Risali (ar) (Risaliyun/The Upholders of the Message)
33rd Brigade	Sami al-Masoudi	Quwat Wa'ad Allah (Islamic Virtue Party)
35th Brigade		Quwat al-Shaheed al-Sadr (Islamic Dawa Party)
36th Brigade		Lalish Regiment, Liwa al-Hussein, and Badr Organization
39th Brigade		Harakat al-Abdal
40th Brigade	Shabal al-Zaidi	Kata'ib al-Imam Ali (Islamic Movement of Iraq)
41st Brigade		Asa'ib Ahl al-Haq
42nd Brigade		Quwat/Liwa [al-Shaheed] al-Qa'id Abu Mousa al-Amiri (Asa'ib Ahl al-Haq)
43rd Brigade		Saba' al-Dujail (Asa'ib Ahl al-Haq)
44th Brigade	Hamid al-Yasiri	Liwa Ansar al-Marja'iyya
45th Brigade	Saraya al-Dafa al-Shaabi	Kata'ib Hezbollah
46th Brigade		Saraya al-Difa' al-Sha'abi (Kata'ib Hezbollah)
47th Brigade		Saraya al-Difa' al-Sha'abi (Kata'ib Hezbollah)
50th Brigade	Rayan al-Kaldani	Babylon Brigade (Babylon Movement)
51st Brigade		Salah al-Din Brigade
52nd Brigade	Mahdi Taqi al-Amerli	Turkmen Brigades and Badr Organization
53rd Brigade	Mukhtar al-Musawi	Liwa al-Hussein and Badr Organization
55th Brigade	Tashkil Malik al-Ashtar.	Badr Organization
56th Brigade	Hussein Ali Najm al-Juburi	Liwa Hashd Shuhada' Kirkuk (Union of National Forces Party)
66th Brigade		Saraya Ansar al-Aqeeda
88th Brigade	Sheikh Wanas al-Jabara	
90th Brigade	Ahmad al-Juburi	Fursan al-Jubur
91st Brigade	Abd al-Raheem al-Shammary; Abd al-Khaliq al-Mutlak al-Jarba	Nawader Shammar (Shammar tribal force)
92nd Brigade	Abd al-Rahman al-Luwaizi	Turkmen Brigades
99th Brigade	Sa'ad Sawar	Jaysh al-Mu'ammal
110th Brigade		Badr Organization
201st Brigade		Ninawa Guards
313th Brigade		Saraya al-Salam
314th Brigade		Saraya al-Salam
14th Regiment	Omar Fadhil al-Alaf	Mosul natives (mostly from al-Arabi neighbourhood)
38th Regiment ("Banners of Iraq")	Sheikh Faris al-Sab'awi †; Sheikh al-Meqdad Faris	Sab'aween tribe
39th Regiment		Qayyarah branch of the Jubur tribe
41st Regiment ("Force of Determination")	Muhammad Ahmad Abdullah al-Waka ("Abu al-Karar")	Jubur tribe
80th Regiment		Sinjar Resistance Units
	Wathiq al-Firdousi	Quwat al-Bairaq – Kata'ib al-Shahid al-Awwal

In February 2019, (PMF) raided a base belonging to Abu al-Fadl al-Abbas Forces, during the raid the group's leader Aws al-Khafaji was arrested by Iraqi forces, the Popular Mobilization Forces claimed that the raid was part of an ongoing operation to crack down on fake groups claiming to be part of PMF in order to commit crimes. The group also never formally declared itself as part of PMF nor had it ever registered as part of PMF with the Iraqi government.

In 2020, Kata'ib Hezbollah, Harakat Hezbollah al-Nujaba, Asa'ib Ahl al-Haq and Kata'ib Sayyid al-Shuhada formed the Islamic Resistance in Iraq.

== Composition and organization ==
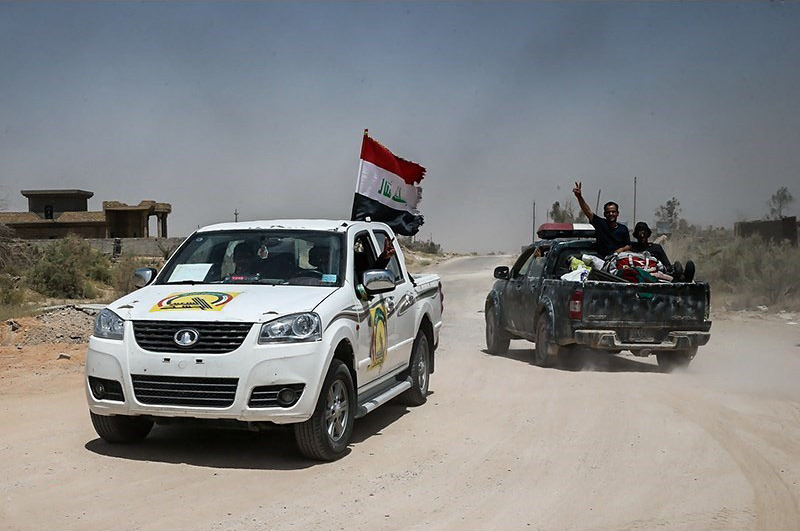
Pickup trucks bearing the insignia of the PMF, 2016

While there are no official data about the strength of the Popular Mobilization Forces, there are some estimates, differing significantly. Around Tikrit reports in 2015 suggested there were about 20,000 engaged militiamen, while the grand total ranges are from 2–5 million to 300,000–450,000 Iraqi armed forces. Higher estimates have included about 40,000 Sunni fighters in 2016, a figure evolving from reports in early 2015, which counted 1,000 to 3,000 Sunni fighters. By early March 2015 the Popular Mobilization Forces appeared to be strengthening its foothold in the Yazidis town of Shingal by recruiting and paying local people.

The Popular Mobilization Forces consist of both new volunteers and pre-existing militias, which have been grouped within the umbrella organization formally under the control of the Ministry of Interior Popular Mobilization Units directorate. Among these militias there are the Peace Companies (formerly known as the Mahdi Army), Kata'ib Hezbollah, Kata'ib Sayyid al-Shuhada, Kata'ib al-Imam Ali, Asa'ib Ahl al-Haq and the Badr Organization.

Prime Minister Haider al-Abadi ordered on April 7, 2015, that the Popular Mobilization Forces be placed under the direct command of the prime minister's office, thus giving a further official status to the militia.

In 2015, the chairman of the Popular Mobilization Committee in the Iraqi government was Falih al-Fayyadh, who is also the National Security Adviser. The Popular Mobilization Committee is under the Office of Prime Minister. The PMF are said to have been led on the battlefields by Jamal Jaafar Mohammed, also known as Abu Mahdi al-Muhandis, the head of Kata'ib Hezbollah, but the chain of command runs through pre-existing leaders. According to Iraqi sources, as well as to the London-based pro-Saudi Asharq Al-Awsat, the different militias rely on their own chain of command, and rarely work together or follow regular Iraqi Army's orders.

The Laws and conduct by which the PMF should abide are those of the Iraqi Government since the Iraqi Prime Minister has the final control over the PMF. Nonetheless, Marja' Ali al-Sistani issued an "Advice and Guidance to the Fighters on the Battlefields" which included a 20 points form of how the PMF should conduct themselves. The main points were that the PMF should treat the liberated areas locals with the Islamic Law which is as quoted from the second point which is a Hadith of the Muslim Prophet Muhammed; "Do not indulge in acts of extremism, do not disrespect dead corpses, do not resort to deceit, do not kill an elder, do not kill a child, do not kill a woman, and do no not cut down trees unless necessity dictates otherwise". Other points included the same aforementioned guidance when treating non-Muslims and also not to steal or disrespect people even if they are the families of the ISIS fighters.

Alongside Abu Mahdi al-Muhandis, other people in charge of the PMF include Qais al-Khazali, commander of Asa'ib Ahl al-Haq, and Hadi Al-Amiri, the chief of the Badr Organization. According to The New York Times, such organizational autonomy may present a challenge to the consolidation of Haider al-Abadi's authority. Volunteers include Shia Arabs, and smaller numbers of Iraqi Christians, Sunni Arabs, and Shia Turkmen.

The militias are trained and supported by military advisers from Turkey (for Sunni and Turkmeni troops), Iran, and Hezbollah, including prominent Quds Force figures, such as (until his 2020 death) Qasem Soleimani. The PMF also appeared to have deployed at least a regiment under the command of Colonel Jumaa al-Jumaily in Al Anbar Governorate. They are also said to have their own military intelligence, administrative systems, a sort of "media war team" that provides morale boosting, battlefield updates and propaganda videos, and a court of law.

=== Shia Arab component ===
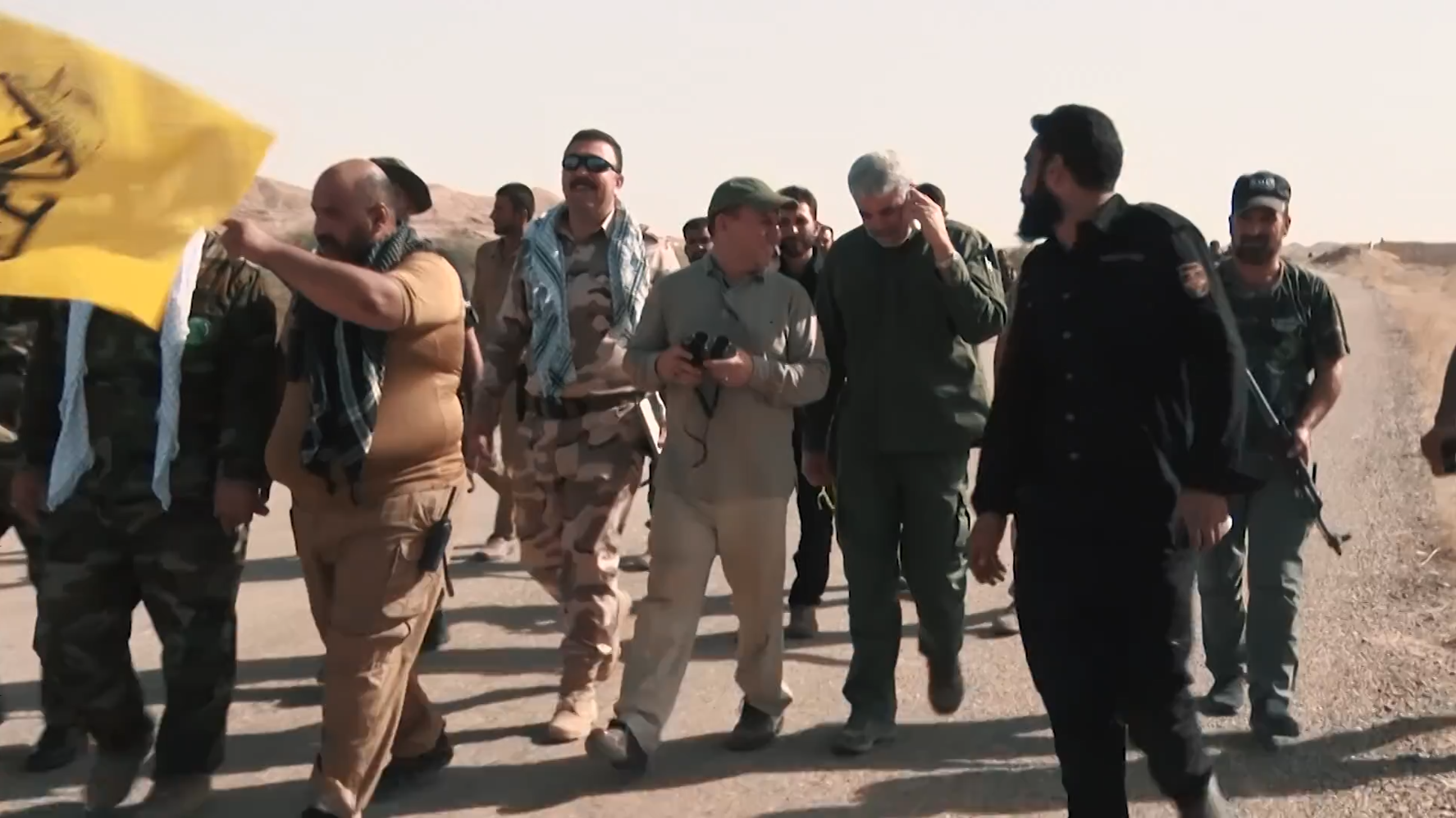
PMF commanders with IRGC advisors during the Hawija offensive (2017)

According to a Sunni newspaper, there are three main Shia components within the Popular Mobilization Forces: the first are the groups that were formed following Sistani's fatwa, without political roots or ambitions; the second are groups that were formed by political parties or are initially the military wings of these parties, with definite political characterization; the third is the armed groups that have been present in Iraq for years and have fought battles against US forces and also participated in operations in Syria.

According to Faleh A. Jabar and Renad Mansour for The Carnegie Foundation, the Popular Mobilization Forces are factionally divided into three Shia components: a component pledging allegiance to Supreme Leader of Iran Ali Khamenei; a faction pledging allegiance to Grand Ayatollah Ali al-Sistani; and the faction headed by Iraqi cleric Muqtada al-Sadr.

The most powerful groups within the Popular Mobilization Forces are the groups which maintain strong ties with Iran and pledge spiritual allegiance to Supreme Leader Ali Khamenei. The pro-Khamanei faction would consist of already established parties and of relatively small paramilitaries: Saraya Khurasani, Kata'ib Hezbollah, Kata'ib Abu Fadhl al-Abbas, the Badr Organization and Asa'ib Ahl al-Haq. These groups serve as a kind of border guard—a sort of Iranian insurance policy against threats on its immediate border. Their leaders publicly take pride in such affiliations, professing religious allegiance to Khamenei and his notion of Vilayat al-Faqih.

According to Faleh A. Jabar and Renad Mansour, the pro-Sistani faction consists of those armed groups formed by Sistani's fatwa to defend Shia holy sites and by paramilitary of the Islamic Supreme Council of Iraq. There are four major groups organized by Najaf: Saraya al-Ataba al-Abbasiya, Saraya al-Ataba al-Hussainiya, Saraya al-Ataba al-Alawiya, and Liwa 'Ali al-Akbar, corresponding to Shia holy sites in Kadhimiya, Karbala, and Najaf. The Islamic Supreme Council of Iraq also swears allegiance to Sistani. After the Badr Organization left the Islamic Supreme Council of Iraq, its leader Ammar al-Hakim formed new paramilitary units, including Saraya el-Jihad, Saraya el-'Aqida, and Saraya 'Ashura.

Muqtada al-Sadr's Peace Companies (Saraya al-Salam) were founded in June 2014 from the Mahdi Army. According to Faleh A. Jabar and Renad Mansour, the Sadrists have largely been cut off from Iranian funding.

According to Shia P.M.F. officials, the recruitment campaign is successful also because it is administered by the religious establishment and Shia religious scholars from the hawza are instrumental in recruitment. Recruitment via Shia Islamist political party structures and even individual clerics or members of parliament is pursued more the official PMF Commission, which lacks recruitment offices.

=== Sunni Arab component ===
In early stages of the PMF, the Shia component was almost exclusive and the Sunni one was negligible since it counted only 1,000 to 3,000 men. In January 2016, Prime Minister Haider al-Abadi approved the appointment of 40,000 Sunni fighters to the Popular Mobilization Forces. According to Al-Monitor, his move was decided in order to give a multiconfessional image to the Forces; however, Sunni fighters began to volunteer even before al-Abadi's decision. Adding Sunni fighters to the Popular Mobilization Units could set the stage for the force to become the core of the envisioned National Guard. According to The Economist, as of late April 2016 the Hashd had approximately 16,000 Sunnis.

It has been observed that the Sunni Arab tribes that took part in al-Hashd al-Shaabi 2015 recruitment are those which also had good relations with Nouri al-Maliki during his tenure as prime minister.

According to Yazan al-Jabouri, a secular Sunni commander of anti-ISIS Liwa Salahaddin, as of November 2016, there were 30,000 Iraqi Sunnis fighting within the ranks of PMUs.

=== Shia Turkmen component ===
The Turkmen Hashd overall constitute around four thousand members and are called "Brigade 12".

According to Faleh A. Jabar and Renad Mansour for The Carnegie Foundation, Shia Turkmen joined Popular Mobilization Forces in order to increase their local autonomy from the Kurdistan Region and in order to counter Sunni Turkmen, who joined the Islamic State.

=== Christian component ===
There are also Christian PMF units in the Nineveh plains. The Imam Ali Brigades trained two Christian units called Kata’ib Rouh Allah Issa Ibn Miriam (Spirit of God, Jesus Son of Mary Brigade) and the Babylon Brigades. The Babylon Brigades have been described as "pseudo-Christian", as they are led by a Christian commander but are mostly made up of Shabaks and Shia Arabs. In March 2023 there was a brief clash between the Babylon Brigades and the Assyrians of Qaraqosh after the former attempted to take control of a base belonging to the Nineveh Plains Protection Units.

== Equipment ==
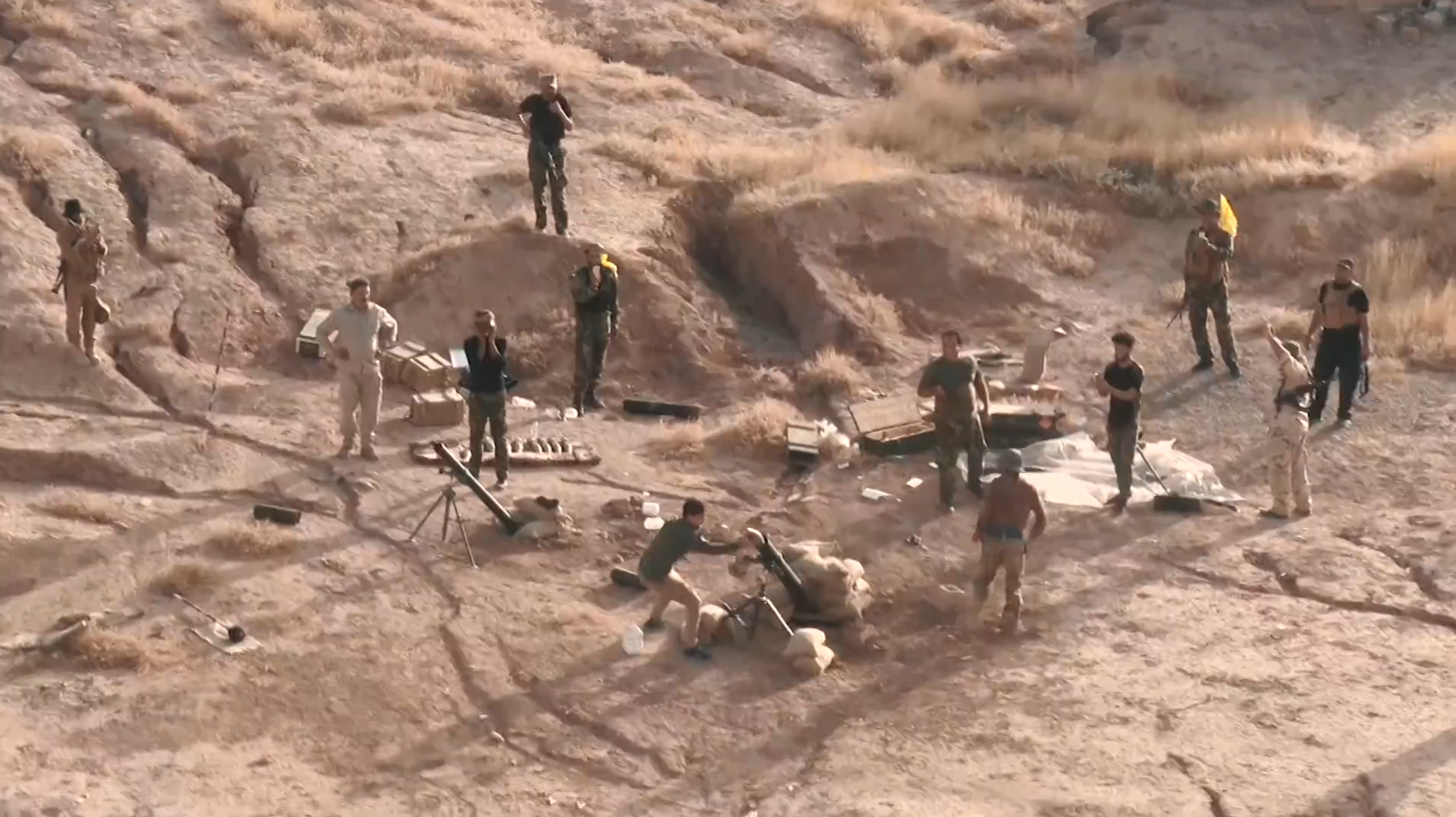
Popular Mobilization Forces fire a mortar during the Hawija offensive in 2017.

The equipment of the Popular Mobilization Forces is a major issue. At the end of January 2015, a video showed a large Kata'ib Hezbollah convoy transporting several American-made military vehicles, including an M1 Abrams Tank, M113 armoured personnel carriers, Humvees, and MRAP vehicles as well as Iranian-made Safir 4×4s and technicals with Kata'ib Hezbollah's flags flying. According to some sources, the Iraqi government is supplying U.S.-provided military equipment to the militias. Iraqi minister of transportation, and the head of the Badr Organization, Hadi Al-Amiri criticized the U.S. for the lack of providing arms. On the other hand, U.S. officials argue that the operators of heavy weapons allegedly taken over by Kata'ib Hezbollah were regular Iraqi soldiers who raised the Hezbollah flag merely in solidarity with the militant group, while the same source acknowledged that it is generally difficult to monitor U.S.-made weapons.

Alongside U.S.-made military equipment handed over to or fallen into the hands of Popular Mobilization Forces, Iran is a major supplier. According to some sources, in 2014 Tehran sold Baghdad nearly $10 billion worth of weapons and hardware. Furthermore, there is a daily supply of Iranian weapons, including Iranian-made 106 mm anti-tank guns as well as 120 mm, 82 mm and 60 mm mortars.

In May 2015, the United States started delivering about $1.6 billion worth of military equipment under the supervision of the Government of Iraq. According to some sources, the major beneficiaries of the weapons deliveries are to be the Popular Mobilization Forces.

Heavy armour seemed to be operated by Popular Mobilization Forces in the operations surrounding the battle of Mosul.

== History and major engagements ==
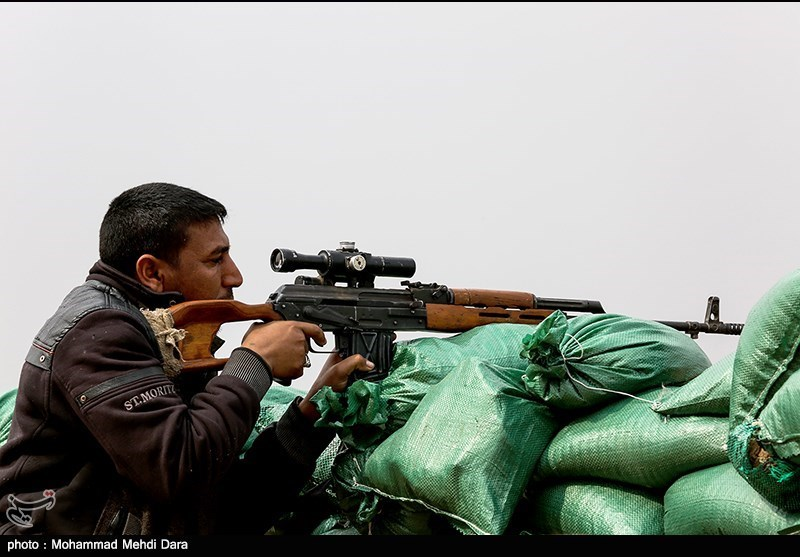
A sniper with a SVD rifle during the battle of Tal Afar. The PMF were an important factor for the Iraqi government's victory over the Islamic State in the war in Iraq and the more global war on the militant group.

The Popular Mobilization Forces have been involved in several battles of the military intervention against the Islamic State of Iraq and the Levant since their founding, the most important being the Second Battle of Tikrit. After the end of the battle of Tikrit, the complex of occupation forces handed over security issues to local police and security forces.

On Monday April 6, 2015, Iraqi prime minister Haider al-Abadi said that, while being heavily involved in the conquest of Tikrit, the Popular Mobilization Forces will not join the planned Mosul conquest. This statement was reversed in March 2016, when al-Abadi reportedly rejected calls by Nineveh's provincial council to prohibit Popular Mobilization Forces from taking part in retaking Mosul.

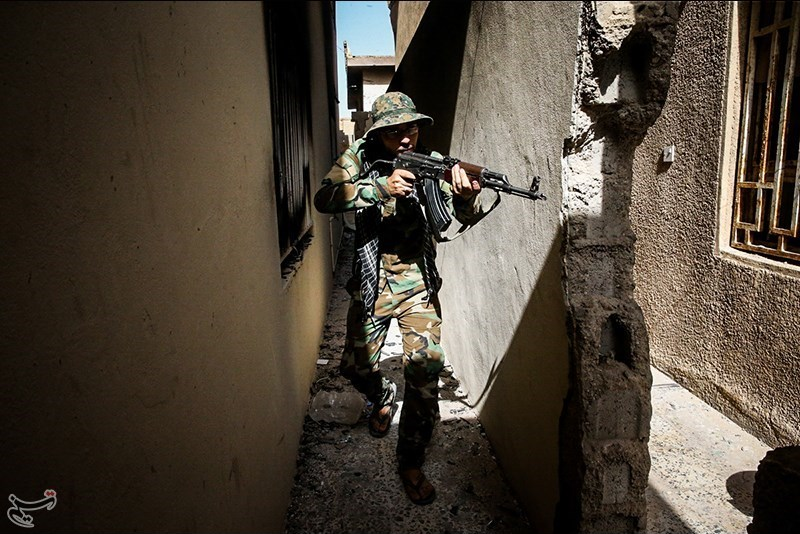
PMF soldier searching buildings for remaining ISIS militants after the Third Battle of Fallujah

Shia volunteers reportedly entered Al Anbar Governorate on the first days of May 2015, among heavy protests of Sunnite personalities, with limited operations continuing in 2016.

In Autumn 2016, they participated in the Mosul Offensive acting as left flank of the anti-IS forces, and by November had captured a number of smaller towns and villages from IS, expanding roughly along a line from Qayyarah to Tal Afar, while keeping a distance (20+ km) to the city of Mosul itself.

In October 2017, the PMF was part of the Iraqi government forces that recaptured Kirkuk, which had been under Kurdish control since 2014.

=== Engagement in Syria ===
Khomeinist PMF militia factions loyal to the Iranian Supreme Leader have been heavily deployed in the Syrian civil war on the side of the Assad regime, often with the stated aim of defending Shi'ite shrines. Although at the time of the formation of the PMF, most of its component groups were primarily engaged in Iraq against ISIL, after the reduction of the immediate ISIL threat in Iraq from 2015, many returned to Syria. For instance, in January 2015, pro-Iran Kata’ib Sayyid al-Shuhada militant group announced the deaths of two of its fighters in defense of Sayyidah Zaynab Mosque in Damascus, and the militia's involvement in the 2015 Southern Syria offensive was documented by the Iraqi TV station Al-Anwar 2. Between 2013 and early 2016, 1,200 Iraqi fighters died in Syria, including combatants of pro-Iran militias Asa'ib Ahl al-Haq and Kata'ib al-Imam Ali, among them senior commanders Abu al-Fadl and Abu Haider al-Nazari.

On the other hand, pro-Sistani and Sadrist PMF militias wary of Iranian influence in Iraq are strongly opposed to the intervention in Syria and have been resisting recruitment attempts made by pro-Iran factions to send Iraqis to die on the side of Assad regime.

=== American-led airstrikes ===
Kata’ib Sayyid al-Shuhada, a member of the PMF, stated that their forces were bombed by US planes on 7 August 2017, in Al Anbar Governorate near the Iraq–Syria border and that Hashd al-Shaabi forces suffered many casualties. The Baghdad-based spokesman of the U.S.-led coalition, Army Col. Ryan Dillon, dismissed the allegation, saying on Twitter that no coalition airstrikes took place in the area at the time. According to the militia's deputy, Ahmed al-Maksousi, they were hit by artillery fire in Syria's Jamouna area, about 12 kilometers (about 7.5 miles) from the Iraqi border. Along with 40 killed, many militiamen were wounded, al-Maksousi added.

On 22 August 2019, The Popular Mobilization Forces (PMF), blamed the United States and Israel for a number of bombings on their warehouses and bases. The group accused the US of permitting Israeli drones to join its forces for executing attacks on Iraqi territory. The group pledged to counter any attack in the future. On 23 August, a fatwa issued by Ayatollah Kazem al-Haeri called for attacks against US troops in Iraq, "the presence of any US military force in Iraq is forbidden (haram) under any title: military training, advice or the rationale of fighting terrorism".

On 29 December 2019, the United States bombed the headquarters of PMF member Kata'ib Hezbollah near Al-Qa'im, killing 25 militiamen.

On 3 January 2020, PMF commander Abu Mahdi al-Muhandis, PMF PR head Mohammed Redha al-Jabri, and the Quds Force head, Qasem Soleimani, were among those killed in an assassination near Baghdad Airport.

On 12 March 2020, the U.S. launched air raids against five Kata'ib Hezbollah weapons storage bases across Iraq in retaliation for the 2020 Camp Taji attacks.

On 25 February 2021, a U.S. air raid killed one and wounded four while targeting PMF facilities on the Iraqi-Syrian border in Syria's eastern Deir ez-Zor Governorate. The facilities were used by PMF forces combatting ISIL in collaboration with the Iraqi and Syrian governments. U.S. officials described the PMF as an "Iranian-backed militia" and the air strike as a retaliation for purported Iranian military aggression against U.S. facilities in Iraq, while Iranian officials denied involvement. Iraqi officials repudiated any connection between the PMF and the insurgents who previously attacked U.S. facilities. The Pentagon asserted that the air raid followed consultation with the Iraqi government and other partners in the region, but the Iraqi military denied providing the U.S. with information regarding locations within Syria.

On 27 June 2021, U.S. forces bombed two locations after an increase in drone attacks. One location was a drone-making facility and the other a conventional weapons exchange depot. Four members of Kataib Sayyed al-Shuhada faction were claimed to have been killed in the action.

On 4 January 2024, U.S. airstrikes on PMF's logistical headquarters killed two people, including the organization's deputy head of operations in Baghdad, Mushtaq Talib Al-Saeedi, and wounded five others.

On 2 February 2024, U.S. airstrikes targeted the headquarters of the PMF in Akashat in Anbar Governorate, killing 16 fighters and wounding 25.

On 23 March 2026, U.S. airstrikes in Anbar Governorate killed "at least 15" fighters from the PMF and also struck the residence of Falih Al-Fayyadh, located in Mosul, though he was not present.

=== 2025 PMF Reform Bill ===
In March 2025, the Iraqi parliament introduced a draft law aimed at reforming the PMF and more fully integrating them into the state security apparatus. A central provision of the proposed legislation is the formal subordination of the PMF to the authority of the Iraqi prime minister, who serves as the commander-in-chief of the armed forces - explicitly distancing the group from external influence, particularly from Iran. The bill also includes measures such as a mandatory retirement age for senior commanders, which could lead to the replacement of key figures with longstanding ties to Tehran. The initiative reflects growing U.S. pressure on the Iraqi government to assert national control over the PMF and curb Iranian influence within its ranks. In contrast, the close relationship between PMF leadership and Iran was underscored by a February 2025 visit by PMF Chairman Falih al-Fayyadh to senior Iranian officials – a move widely interpreted as an attempt to rally support from Tehran against the proposed legislation, especially among hardline factions that often operate with considerable autonomy.

=== Iran War ===
On 14 March 2026, a faction of the IRI, Kataib Hezbollah, launched a drone that breached the air defenses of the Camp Victory base and managed to strike it. On 17 March 2026, the Saraya Awliya al-Dam faction of the IRI published footage of a reconnaissance drone flying above the US embassy compound in Baghdad. According to an observer, the footage is consistent with the footage obtained from a fiber optic drone, suggesting that the group had acquired such advanced technology. On 21 March 2026 the Ashab al-Kahf faction of the IRI claimed responsibility for killing a French soldier in an attack on a base in Iraq, and on the same day set the Camp Victory base ablaze. On 25 March 2026 an AN/MPQ-64 Sentinel along with a Black Hawk were struck at the Victory Base Complex in Bahgdad by an IRI fiber optic drone as part of the Iran war. On 28 March 2026, it was reported that the Iranian-backed militia had begun mobilizing forces to Iran amid the 2026 Iran war. Videos showed a convoy on its way, later spotted at Khorramshahr in southwestern Iran.

== Terrorism ==
Kata'ib Hezbollah, one of the forces of the PMF, is listed by Japan's Public Security Intelligence Agency as a terrorist organization. The United Arab Emirates also classifies it as terrorist group. Kata'ib Hezbollah was designated a terrorist entity in 2009 by the United States. Its leader, Abu Mahdi al-Muhandis, was also designated a terrorist. In March 2019, U.S. designated Harakat al-Nujaba and its leader Akram al-Ka'abi Specially Designated Global Terrorists (SDGT). In 2020, Asa'ib Ahl al-Haq, a powerful Iran-backed militia, part of the PMF, was designated as a Foreign Terrorist Organization by the United States. In November 2023, U.S. added PMF militia Kata'ib Sayyid al-Shuhada to its list of Specially Designated Global Terrorists. In June 2024, Ansar Allah al-Awfiya was designated as a terrorist organization, following several attacks on U.S. bases in the region including the Tower 22 drone attack.

== Involvement in suppressing protests ==
=== 2019–2021 Iraqi protests ===
During the 2019–2021 Iraqi protests, which called for the end of the sectarian political system, some militias associated with PMF took part in violently suppressing the protests by using live bullets, marksmen, hot water, hot pepper gas and tear gas against protesters, leading to over 1,000 deaths and over 30,000 injuries.

=== 2022 and 2025–2026 Iranian protests ===
In the wake of the Mahsa Amini protests, reports surfaced that Iran had brought in Iraqi allies, specifically members of Hashd al-Shaabi and Kata'ib Hezbollah, to assist in cracking down on protests. Eyewitnesses reported the arrival of these forces in Iran, suggesting their involvement in suppressing the demonstrations.

Likewise during the 2025–2026 Iranian protests, the presence of Iraqi Popular Mobilization Forces, Arabic-speaking mercenaries, Lebanese Hezbollah, and Afghan Liwa Fatemiyoun in suppressing protests was reported. Approximately 800 members of Iraqi Shia militia groups, including Kata'ib Hezbollah, Harakat al-Nujaba, Sayyid al-Shuhada, and Badr Corps, had been sent to Iran. According to an Iraqi security force, around 5,000 Iraqi Shia militants entered Iran to suppress the protests. The troops were reportedly transported through the border crossings of Shalamcheh, Chazhabeh, and Khosravi, officially under the cover of a "pilgrimage to the holy sites of Imam Reza in Mashhad," while in practice they were gathered at a base in Ahvaz before being dispatched to various regions to assist in suppressing protests. On January 9, 2026, the United States warned Iran against using foreign militias to crush protests.

== Domestic criticisms and war crimes accusations ==
Some of the militias constituting the Popular Mobilization Forces have been accused of war crimes motivated by sectarian revenge. According to Amnesty International in 2014, Shia militias have abducted, tortured and killed numerous Sunni civilians and, according to Western sources, in Tikrit militants have committed some violence, while being publicly praised; In the wake of the conquest of Tikrit, Iraqi authorities declared that war crimes would be investigated and their perpetrators punished.

High Shia authorities, such as Grand Ayatollah Ali al-Sistani and Ayatollah Hussein Al-Sadr, called on the militants in the PMF to refrain from war crimes or other despicable behaviour. In 2015, ad hoc government inquiry committees were established to investigate civilian deaths attributed to the militias.

In 2016, Mosul Sunni dignitaries and officials accused the PMF of killings of Sunnis, takeovers of schools and forcing Sunnis to sell property in the prime real estate area close to the Mosul shrine. According to City council's deputy chairman Muzher Fleih, 650 Sunnis have disappeared. Militia leaders insist any abuses are isolated incidents, and only target captured Islamic State collaborators.

Alongside war crimes accusations, concerns regarding the constitutionality and politicization of al-Hashd al-Shaabi have been raised. Sunni sources have called for depoliticization of the Popular Mobilization Forces, to be achieved under the proposed National Guard bill. According to some critics in 2015, the Popular Mobilization Forces were not sanctioned by the Constitution of Iraq and nonetheless had a budget and were paid on a regular basis by the Iraqi government, whilst the legally established Peshmerga had not received their wages. The official status and actual dependence of the Popular Mobilization Forces on the Baghdad government and its help was not fully resolved as of late 2015. However, by the end of 2016, a law was passed bringing the PMU under the auspices of the Supreme Commander of the Iraqi National Army, incorporating PMF units into the official army of Iraq and removing any official affiliation with any social, religious or political group.

Recruitment of Yazidis in Kurdish areas has been deemed to go against official Kurdish policy against the move: in February 2015, Kurdistan Region President Massoud Barzani asked the Peshmerga minister to stop all militia activities in the area.

Allegedly, clerics from the Najaf Seminary, including Grand Ayatollah Ali al-Sistani, also criticized the monopolistic conduct of Abu Mahdi al-Muhandis.

In April 2026, Reza Pahlavi posted on X calling for the Expulsion of the Popular Mobilization Forces from Iran. He said they have been seen stationed on Iranian streets carrying Iraqi flags and urged that "the terrorists" do not belong in Iran.

=== Concerns about growth ===
The Popular Mobilization Forces are accused of accruing a power base in Iraq and of being Iran's instrument to dominate Iraq. The main fears are that the permanent militia would turn themselves into enforcers of Shia domination. The Iraqi Police headquarters in the Muthanna Governorate announced that they were in the process of commissioning Popular Mobilization battalions with security tasks in early January 2016. These tasks included protecting public and private establishments in open desert areas, among others. Other reports indicate that Popular Mobilization is securing border outlets and controlling security in liberated cities.

According to General Ali Omran, commander of the army's 5th Infantry Division, P.M.F. militias are too entrenched in politics and at risk of "coming to blows" with the Armed Forces. In February 2016, militiamen refused orders to vacate a building in a military base north of Baghdad.

According to AP-interviewed government officials and militia leaders, due to the fear of a return to Sunni minority rule over the Iraqi Shia majority, PMF militias want to remain a permanent, independent armed force; Hamed al-Jazaeery, head of the al-Khorasani Brigades militia, stated that the model is the Islamic Revolutionary Guard Corps.

== National guard ==
In 2016, Commander of the CJTF-OIR Lt Gen. Stephen J. Townsend described the PMF as "remarkably disciplined" allies since he arrived. He added that the PMF could make Iraq more secure—if they become a national guard-like force, and not a "puppet" of Iran.

== See also ==
- Abu Azrael
- Abu Tahsin
- 2019–2021 Iraqi protests
- Holy Shrine Defender
- Iranian intervention in Iraq (2014–present)
- Iraqi insurgency
- Islamic Resistance in Iraq
- List of armed groups in the Iraqi Civil War
- List of armed groups in the Syrian Civil War
- Private militias in Iraq
