= Ahmed Al Asadi =

Iraqi politician

Ahmed Al Asadi أحمد الأسدي

Minister of Labor and Social Affairs for Iraq
- In office October 2022 – 14 May 2026

Personal details
- Born: February 1, 1970 (age 56) Dhi Qar Governorate, Ba'athist Iraq
- Party: Bilad Sumer Bloc

Ahmed Jassim Al Asadi (also spelled al-Assadi, Arabic: أحمد الأسدي) (born 1 February 1970) is an Iraqi politician and militia leader who served as the Minister of Labour and Social Affairs during 2022–2026. He leads the Bilad Sumer Bloc (previously Sanad National Bloc), which is part of the governing Coordination Framework. He also leads the 'Islamic Movement in Iraq' and its armed wing Kata'ib Jund al-Imam. He was previously the spokesman of the Fatah Alliance and the Popular Mobilization Forces. On 9 August 2026, the Supreme Judicial Council ordered his arrest.

He was the victim of an extortion campaign carried out by Australian and Canadian citizens. Al-Asadi is a dual Australian and Iraqi national.He hails from the Banu Asad tribe.

== Positions ==
- Member of the Foreign Relations Committee of the Iraqi Parliament
- MP from Dhi Qar Governorate
- He was considered an alternative deputy to then-Prime Minister Haider al-Abadi
- He served as a national reconciliation adviser to the former Iraqi prime minister

== See also ==
- Hadi Al-Amiri
- Abu Mahdi al-Muhandis
- Mohanad Najim Aleqabi
- Qais Khazali
