= Kata'ib Jund al-Imam =

Iraqi Shia militant organization

- كتائب جند الإمام
- Leader: Ahmed al-Asadi
- Dates active: 1991 – present
- Ideology: Shia Islamism; Khomeinism
- Part of: Popular Mobilization Forces

Kata'ib Jund al-Imam (Arabic: كتائب جند الإمام; Soldiers of the Imam Battalion) is an Iraqi Shia militant organization and the sixth brigade of the Popular Mobilization Forces.

== History ==
The flag of Kata'ib Jund al-Imam

The group was originally formed as a militia during the 1991 Iraqi uprisings with help from Iran. The group came back to prominence after re-grouping in Iraq to fight against the Islamic State, one of the main motives for the re-grouping was the Camp Speicher massacre.

In 2014, it participated in the liberation of Jurf Al Sakhar in helping take back control of the area from the Islamic State.

In 2017, the group, along with six other groups, formed the Popular Mobilization Forces as an alliance group.
