= Asayish (Sinjar District) =

Ezidxane Asayish
- Asayîşa Êzîdxanê
- Flag of the Asayîşa Êzîdxanê
- Active: July 2016–present
- Country: Iraq
- Allegiance: Sinjar Resistance Units
- Type: Police
- Role: Security and policing
- Size: 6,000 (July 2017 claim)

Commanders
- Co-commander: Hussein Erzurum

The Asayish (Kurdish: Asayîş, lit. 'security'), officially the Ezidkhan Asayish (Kurdish: Asayîşa Êzîdxanê, lit. 'Security Forces of Ezidkhan'), are the police force in the regions controlled by the Sinjar Resistance Units, which is backed by the PKK. The force aims to protect the rights of the Yazidi people as well as maintain law and order in the Sinjar District where they are located. It has a training post in Sinjar, where the policemen are trained by senior PKK militants. The force also gets official financial aid from Iraq.

The Asayîşa Êzîdxanê are officially not subordinated to the Sinjar Resistance Units and shall attenuate the dependence from institutional powers. The lack of faith in the official powers is a consequence of the escape of Peshmerga-troops in August 2014, which enabled the Genocide of Yazidis by ISIL, which overrun the lines of the Peshmerga into the land of the Yazidis. The new-founded force has the aim to create safety in the area controlled by the PKK and Sinjar Resistance Units to enable the return of the Yazidis in the exodus. Recently, about 90% of the Yazidis hasn't returned to Sinjar yet.

There are tensions with the KDP of the Iraqi Kurdistan region, because the KDP wants to rule over the Sinjar mountains again, while many Yazidis feel betrayed and prefer self-defense and -determination now.

== See also ==
- List of armed groups in the Iraqi Civil War
- December 2014 Sinjar offensive
- Yazidi genocide
- List of Yazidi settlements
