= Saraya al-Jihad =

Iraqi Shia faction

Saraya Jihad
- سرايا الجهاد
- Leader: Hassan al-Sari
- Allegiance: Iraq
- Active regions: Iraq, Syria
- Ideology: Shia Islamism
- Size: 100+
- Part of: Popular Mobilization Forces
- Wars: Iraqi Civil War (2014–2017), Syrian Civil War
- Website: Official website

Saraya Jihad (Arabic: سرايا الجهاد, "Jihad Companies") is an Iraqi Shia group and the armed wing of the Jihad and Development Movement, operating in Iraq and formerly in Syria as the 17th Brigade of the Popular Mobilization Forces. It has been closely intertwined with Liwa al-Muntazar.

== See also ==
- List of armed groups in the Iraqi Civil War
- List of armed groups in the Syrian Civil War
- 2026 Iran war
