= Liwa al-Tafuf =

Iraqi Shia militia

- لواء الطفوف
- Founding leader: Qasim Muslih
- Dates active: 2014-Present
- Split from: Liwa Ali al-Akbar
- Country: Iraq
- Allegiance: Popular Mobilization Forces
- Ideology: Shia Islamism; Anti-Americanism
- Status: active

Liwa al-Tafuf (Arabic: لواء الطفوف, lit. 'Al-Tafuf Brigade') also known as the 13th PMF Brigade is a brigade of the Popular Mobilization Forces in Iraq which split from Liwa Ali al-Akbar in 2014 and was associated with the Imam Husayn Shrine and has participated in the War in Iraq, mostly against the Islamic State, which includes the recapturing of al-Ba'aj and the Battle of Al-Qa'im in 2017.

== History ==
The group was established in 2014 after splitting from the 11th PMF Brigade, Liwa Ali al-Akbar under the guise of Qasim Muslih as the leader of the brigade and tried to remain "legitimate" as a "true" atabat (shrine) but the group fell into the administrative influence of Kata'ib Hezbollah's founder, Abu Mahdi al-Muhandis. The group became well known for taking old armored vehicles from old tanks graveyards and returning them, with ingenious new modifications, to service.

The group has allied with the Iranian Revolutionary Guard Corps and answers to the group with Kata'ib Hezbollah. Though the group is considered pro-Iranian, it doesn't view itself as full allies with the Iranian Revolutionary Guard Corps and has built a better relationship with the local Sunni Muslim populations in Iraq than most of the other PMF Brigades and pro-Iranian militias.

The group has helped smuggled Iranian goods and commerce with Kata'ib Hezbollah, where both basically control it, in the al-Qaim–al-Bukamal border crossing to Syria which was supposedly used to help others battle the Islamic State in Syria during the Syrian civil war. Though some of the goods are supplies to groups, Liwa al-Tafuf and other groups help enable the cross-border drug trade with Iraq and Syria.
