= Islamic Dawa Party in Lebanon =

Islamic Dawa Party in Lebanon حزب الدعوة الإسلامية في لبنان
- Headquarters: Lebanon
- Religion: Shia Islam
- Iraqi counterpart: Islamic Dawa Party

The Islamic Dawa Party in Lebanon (Arabic حزب الدعوة الإسلامية Ḥizb al Daʿwa al-Islāmiyya) was an Islamist Shia party in Lebanon. A twin party of the larger Islamic Dawa Party of Iraq, it was founded by Najaf-educated Shia clerics returning to Lebanon. Its spiritual guide was Sheikh Sayyed Mohammad Hussein Fadlallah.

Dawa was founded in the 1960s. Like its Iraqi twin, Dawa was said to "emphasize extreme secrecy and underground activity, in alignment with traditional Shi'i doctrine of protecting the community against persecution." In 1981 the French ambassador in Lebanon, Louise Delaware, was killed in Beirut. The attack was thought to be in retaliation for France's granting sanctuary to deposed Iranian president Abolhassan Banisadr against the wishes of the Islamic Republic of Iran.

Following the Iranian Revolution, the "more radical Najaf-educated clergy" of Lebanon, with the "active encourage[ment]" of Iran, turned away from the party believing that "the secretive and underground nature of the party" hindered its effectiveness.

It would later become a "core component in the establishment of the Hezbollah movement in 1982" and by late 1984 it had merged with that radical but more open Shia "umbrella group" along with other Lebanese Islamist groups - Islamic Amal, Islamic Jihad Organization, imam Hussein Suicide Squad, Jundallah (Soldiers of God) and the Islamic Students Union. Some parts of the party did not join Hezbollah, and lingered on until being infiltrated by Syrian intelligence in the late 1990s. "The legacy of the Lebanese al-Da'wa party had and continues to have, a strong impact on the ideology, direction and organisational structure" of Hezbollah.
