= Salah al-Din Brigade (Iraq) =

- لواء صلاح الدين
- Founder: Yazan Al-Jubouri
- Leader: Asham Al-Jubouri
- Dates active: 2014–present
- Country: Iraq
- Size: 3,000
- Part of: Popular Mobilization Forces

Salah al-Din Brigade or 51 Brigade in Popular Mobilization Forces It is a Sunni armed group that fights alongside Shiite groups, supported by Iran, that was created to fight ISIS and was formed specifically for the battle of Mosul (2016–17). The matter began in 2014, when Yazan received a call from Baghdad asking him to meet with Abu Mahdi al-Muhandis, and he had obtained permission from the Popular Mobilization Command to begin forming the first Sunni faction within the ranks of the Shiite factions.
