= Abu al-Fadl al-Abbas Forces =

Former anti-Iran Shia Islamist-Iraqi nationalist organization in Iraq

Abu al-Fadl al-Abbas Forces قوات أبو الفضل العباس
- Abu al-Fadl al-Abbas Forces Emblem & Flag
- Leader: Aws al-Khafaji
- Founded: 2014
- Dates active: June 2014–2017/2020
- Dissolved: 2017–2020
- Split from: Sadrist Movement: Peace Companies
- Headquarters: Baghdad (until 2017-2020)
- Active regions: Iraq (until 2017–2020); Syria (until 2017–2020)
- Ideology: Shia Islamism; Iraqi nationalism Anti-Zionism
- Size: Unknown
- Part of: Iraqi Private Militias (until 2017–2020)
- Wars: Iraq conflict; Iraqi insurgency; War in Iraq (2013-2017); Syrian civil war

Abu al-Fadl al-Abbas Forces (Arabic: قوات أبو الفضل العباس Quwwat ‘Ābū al-Faḍl al-‘Abbās), officially named the Qaeda Quwwat Abu Fadl al-Abbas, was a Shia militia which operated in Iraq as well as Syria and was formed following ISIL advances in June 2014. The force is affiliated with Sheikh Aws al-Khafaji, who was previously aligned with Muqtada al-Sadr. The group claimed an affinity with the similarly named Liwa Abu al-Fadhal al-Abbas group fighting in Syrian Civil War on behalf of the Syrian government. QQAFA also appeared to have deep links to Kataib al-Imam Ali.

In February 2019, the Popular Mobilization Forces (PMF) raided a base belonging to the group, during the raid the group's leader Aws al-Khafaji was arrested by Iraqi forces, the Popular Mobilization Forces claimed that the raid was part of an ongoing operation to crack down on fake groups claiming to be part of PMF in order to commit crimes. The group also never formally declared itself as part of PMF nor had it ever registered as part of PMF with the Iraqi government.

The group's leader Aws al-Khafaji has also expressed ideological differences with Iran, and has been critical of Iranian influence in Iraq, and though having a falling-out with Muqtada al-Sadr still adheres to the Sadrist ideology. Khafaji also voiced support for protests in Iraq in mid-2018 over Iranian and Turkish policies causing high salinity in Iraqi water.

During the protests against Iranian policies and influence in Iraq, another commander in the group wrote, "Every noble Iraqi must boycott Iran and Turkey in business, tourism and politics. This is the fate of a country and the Messenger of God (SAWW) said: a non-Arab has shown no compassion for an Arab at all by the Lord of the Ka'aba." Prior to the arrest of the group's overall leader, Khafaji, he made statements in the media criticizing Iran, supporters of the group have claimed that his opposition and criticism of Iran are the real reasons for Khafaji's arrest. Other members of the group have condemned Iran on social media citing that they are not part of PMF as it contains several factions loyal to Iran. The group's branch in Syria and other allied militias composed of Iraqis released a statement condemning the arrest Khafaji.

The Abu al-Fadl al-Abbas Forces were dissolved according to the statement of the General Headquarters no.1191 on either 9 December or 12 September in 2017.

== See also ==
- List of armed groups in the Iraqi Civil War
