= Quwat al-Shaheed al-Sadr =

Iraqi militia

Army of Martyr Sadr
- The Flag of the Islamic Dawa Party
- Leader: Nouri al-Maliki
- Allegiance: Popular Mobilization Forces; Islamic Dawa Party
- Headquarters: Najaf
- Active regions: Iraq
- Ideology: Shiism; Anti-Americanism; Shia jihadism
- Wars: Iraqi Civil War (2013–2017) and Iraqi insurgency against ISIL

Quwat al-Shaheed al-Sadr, translated as the Army of Martyr Sadr, is an Iraqi militia. They are officially known as the 25th Brigade of the Popular Mobilization Forces. It is the military wing of the Islamic Dawa Party, which is led by Nouri al-Maliki.
