= Saraya al-Khorasani =

Iraqi Shia Islamist militant group

- سرایا الخراساني
- Founder: Hamid Taqavi †
- Leader: Ali al-Yasiri
- Dates active: 2013-present
- Allegiance: Popular Mobilization Forces; Iran (IRGC)
- Active regions: Iraq and Syria
- Ideology: Shia Islamism; Khomeinism
- Political position: Right-wing to far-right
- Status: active
- Size: 3,000
- Part of: Popular Mobilization Forces

Saraya al-Khorasani (Arabic: سرايا طليعة الخراساني, romanized: Sarāya Ṭalīʿa al-Ḵurāsānī "The Vanguard Companies of al-Khorasani"), also known as the 18th Brigade of the Popular Mobilization Forces, is a Shia Islamist militia formed in 2013 and engaged in the Second Iraqi Civil War and Syrian Civil War.

== Foundation ==
The militia was first founded in 1986 as a small organization called the "Al-Karrar Brigade”, which was led by Yassin Al-Moussawi, the representative of Muhammad Baqir al-Hakim. The real starting point was in 1995, where it was called the "Tali'a Organization", which opposed the Iraqi government and waged guerrilla warfare in the Mesopotamian Marshes against the government of Saddam Hussein. After the marshes were drained by Saddam Hussein as a part of his campaign against Shia rebels, the group moved to the deserts of Najaf and Karbala. It claims that it carried over 70 attacks against the Iraqi Ba'ath Party.

The modern Saraya al-Khorasani militia was created in September 2013 with the support of Iran. It is the armed branch of an Iraqi political party, "Hezb Taleea al-Islamiya" (Islamic Vanguard Party).

== Ideology ==
The group takes its name from Abu Muslim al-Khorasani, an 8th-century Muslim leader. Although the members of this armed group are Iraqis, its logo is imitated from that of the Iranian Islamic Revolutionary Guard Corps. Its ideology is based on Shiite Islam with marked references to Ali's family.

== Leadership ==
Hamid Taqavi, known as Abu Mariam, an Arab from Iran, general of the Islamic Revolutionary Guard Corps, is said to have been the first leader or a military adviser to the group. He was killed by an ISIS sniper on December 28, 2014, near Samarra. Since then, the secretary-general of the militia has been Ali al-Yasiri, who was injured in November 2014, in the province of Diyala. His deputy is Hamid al Jaza'iri. In 2015, Saraya al-Khorasani went from 1,500 to 3,000 men according to Reuters.

== See also ==
- Islamic Resistance Movement of Azerbaijan
