= Special Forces of Êzîdxan =

The Special Forces of Ezidxan (Kurdish: Yekîneyên Taybet ên Êzîdxanê; YTÊ) is a professionalized Yazidi paramilitary group recruited from Sinjar Resistance Units (YBŞ) and Sinjar Women’s Units (YJŞ). It was established in 2016 to handle special tasks and dangerous missions against the Islamic State of Iraq and Syria (ISIS). These units have been able to rescue Yazidi women from ISIS militants through special operations.

Through a two-month course named after Martyr Tîrêj, recruits are trained in theoretical, political, and military expertise. Following their completion of professional training, they assume their roles in the defense and security of Şengal. In one particular military graduation ceremony of the YTÊ, General Commander of the YBŞ - Mazlûm Şengalî - spoke and congratulated the YTÊ graduates, saying "To better protect our people, we need more professional education. Therefore, these specialized courses will continue. Today, our villages, women, girls, and people are under the control of ISIS. To free them and protect our people, it is necessary for the YBŞ/YJŞ fighters to receive professional training." At the end of the ceremony, the YTÊ fighters took an oath and received their certificates.
