= Turkmen Brigades (Popular Mobilization Forces) =

Armed group operating in Iraq

- Leaders: Seyyid Yılmaz Neccaroğlu (Supervisor); Şehbaz Yılmaz Neccaroğlu (Commander); Fatih Yıldın (Field commander)
- Spokesperson: Seyyid Ali al-Husseini
- Dates active: 2014–present
- Country: Iraq
- Allegiance: Iraq
- Groups: Badr Organization (16th Brigade); Bashir Regiment; Sayyid al-Shuhada; 52nd Brigade; Taza Regiment; 92nd Brigade; Talafar Regiment; Brigade of Imam Hussein
- Active regions: Iraq; Saladin Governorate; Kirkuk Governorate; Nineveh Governorate; Al Anbar Governorate
- Size: 30,000 (2016)
- Part of: Popular Mobilization Forces

The Turkmen Brigades are a group of Iraqi Turkmen-majority paramilitary formations within the Popular Mobilization Forces (PMF), established in 2014 during the conflict with the Islamic State.

The group's commander, Sayyed Yilmaz Najar, rejected proposals for a unified Turkmen militia from the Pro-Turkey group, the Iraqi Turkmen Front. Najar cited his reason for rejecting the proposal as his group having both Shia and Sunni Turkmen, whereas the Iraqi Turkmen Front is exclusively Sunni.

On 25 September 2016 the 16th Brigade announced that the militias would participate in the Hawija Offensive.
