= The Malcolm H. Kerr Carnegie Middle East Center =

Lebanese think tank and research center

- Established: November 2006
- Type: Think Tank
- Headquarters: Downtown, Beirut
- Director: Maha Yahya
- Website: carnegie-mec.org

The Malcolm H. Kerr Carnegie Middle East Center, previously known as The Carnegie Middle East Center (CMEC) is a think tank and research center dealing with public policy in the Middle East. It was established in Beirut, Lebanon in November 2006 by the Carnegie Endowment for International Peace

The center is part of the network of Carnegie regional centers, including the Carnegie Moscow Center, the Carnegie–Tsinghua Center for Global Policy in Beijing, and Carnegie Europe, located in Brussels.

In 2009 and 2015, the University of Pennsylvania’s Global “Go-To Think Tanks” annual report listed the Carnegie Middle East Center as the number one think tank in the Middle East and North Africa.

== Background ==
The Carnegie Middle East Center is an independent policy research institute based in Beirut, Lebanon, and part of the Carnegie Endowment for International Peace. The center's scope of work includes political and economic developments in the Arab world, Turkey and Iran. It includes participation by senior local researchers, visiting experts, and students at various levels. It collaborates with many research centers within the Middle East and elsewhere. This approach provides policy makers, practitioners, and activists with informed analysis and recommendations. It aims to reach a number of constituencies, including policy makers, practitioners, academics, journalists, as well as international organizations, civil society members, and ordinary citizens in Middle Eastern countries who may benefit from the center’s work.

In October 2020, the Carnegie Endowment for International Peace announced the renaming of the Carnegie Middle East Center to the Malcolm H. Kerr Carnegie Middle East Center. This to honor Malcolm H. Kerr.

== Publications ==
The Carnegie Middle East Center issues, in English and Arabic, up to 10 major publications per year, along with frequent website and external op-ed pieces, which are widely circulated within and beyond the Middle East. The center publishes Diwan, a platform that offers commentary from various scholars, journalists, and experts on current issues in the region, which is run from Beirut and edited by Michael Young.
