= Liwa Ali al-Akbar =

Iraqi Shia Militia

- لواء علي الأكبر
- Leader: Ali al-Hamadani
- Dates active: 2014–present
- Allegiance: Iraq
- Active regions: Nineveh Governorate; Saladin Governorate
- Ideology: Shia Islamism; Sistanism
- Part of: / Popular Mobilization Forces
- Wars: War in Iraq (2014–2017), Iraqi insurgency (2017–present)
- Website: Official website

Liwa Ali al-Akbar (Arabic: لواء علي الأكبر, romanized: Liwāʾ ʿAlī al-Akbar, English: Ali al-Akbar Brigade) or as the Popular Mobilization Forces' 11th Brigade is an Iraqi Shiite faction part of the Popular Mobilization Forces and affiliated with the Imam Husayn Shrine in Karbala. It was formed after the fatwa of al-Jihad al-Kafa’i issued by Sayyid Ali al-Sistani and under the auspices of the Secretary General of the Hussaini Shrine, Sheikh Abdul Mahdi al-Karbalai. Abu Tahsin al-Salhi is also from the faction.

== See also ==
- List of armed groups in the War in Iraq
- Private militias in Iraq
