= Saraya Ansar al-Aqeeda =

Shia Islamist Iraqi militia

Saraya Ansari al-Aqeeda
- سرايا انصار العقيده
- Dates active: 2012—Present
- Wars: Syrian civil war Iraqi insurgency

Saraya Ansar al-Aqeeda (Arabic: سرايا انصار العقيده, lit. 'Supporters of the Creed Brigade') is a Shia Islamist Iraqi militia.

== History ==
Saraya Ansar al-Aqeeda was formed in June 2014 by Jalal al-Din Ali al-Saghir and Iraqi Shiite militiamen who left to fight in Syria in 2012, before returning to Iraq during the Islamic State offensives in 2014.

In 2016, Saraya Ansar al-Aqeeda started military campaigns in Fallujah against the Islamic State as revenge for the Islamic State killing some of Saraya Ansar al-Aqeeda's soldiers.

On October 12, 2023, Saraya al-Aqeeda would upload a YouTube video titled "اللواء ۲۸ يبارك للشعب الفلسطيني عملية طوفان الاقصى" (English: The 28th Brigade congratulates the Palestinian people on Operation Al-Aqsa Flood) in which they congratulated Hamas for the actions they took during the 2023 Hamas-led attack on Israel.
